= HMAS Cape Schanck =

Cape-class patrol boat of the Royal Australian Navy

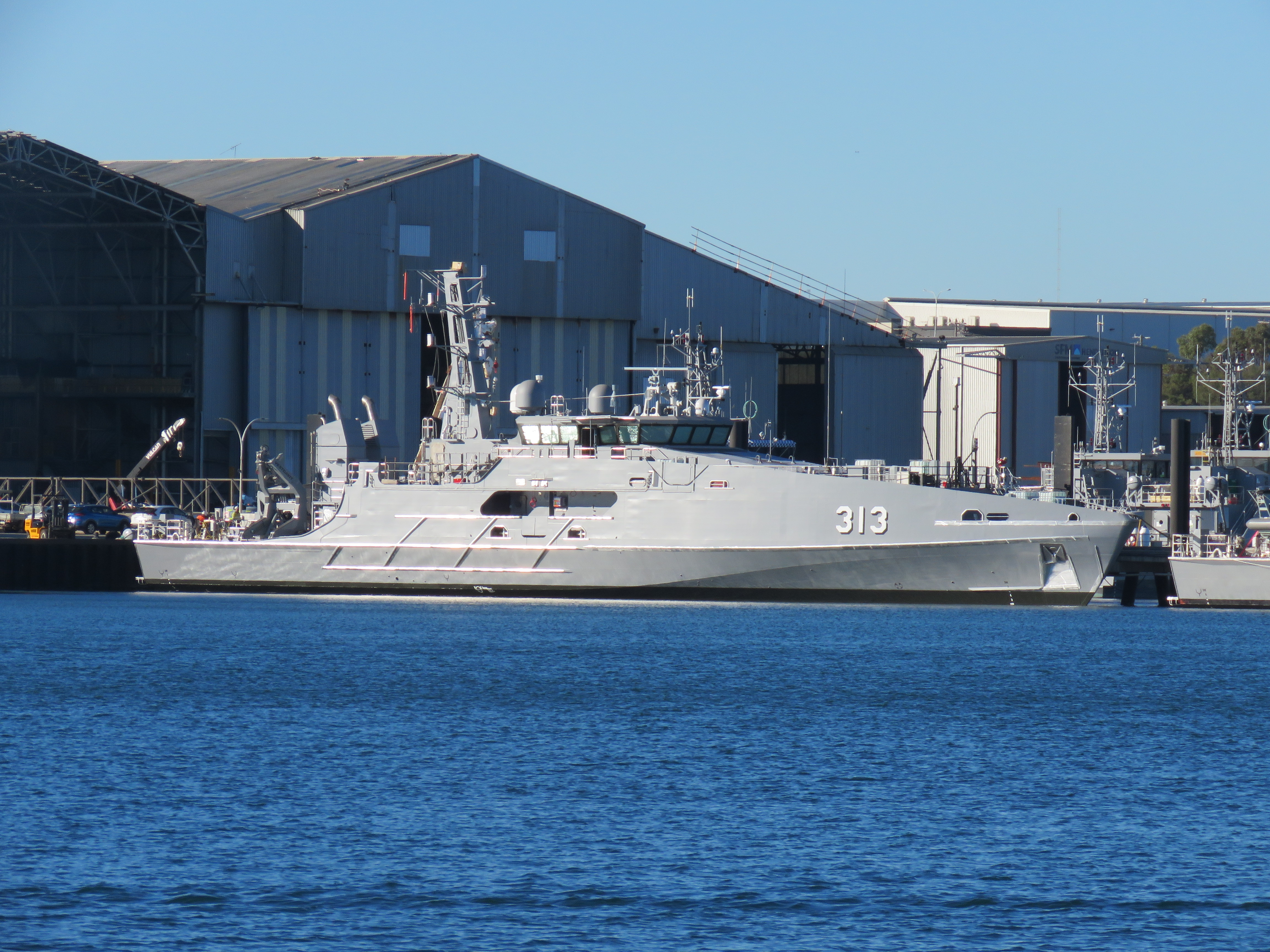
- ADV Cape Schanck at Austal shipyards in Henderson, Western Australia in June 2024

History

Australia
- Namesake: Cape Schanck
- Builder: Austal, Henderson, Western Australia
- Launched: Mid-2024
- Commissioned: 9 May 2025
- In service: 1 November 2024
- Home port: HMAS Coonawarra
- Identification: IMO number: 4771944; Pennant number: 313

General characteristics
- Class & type: Cape-class patrol boat
- Length: 58.1 m (190 ft 7 in)
- Beam: 10.6 m (34 ft 9 in)
- Draught: 3.1 m (10 ft 2 in)
- Propulsion: 2 x Caterpillar 3516C diesels 6,770 horsepower (5,050 kW) 2 shafts, 1 bow thruster
- Speed: 26 knots (48 km/h; 30 mph)
- Range: 4,000 nautical miles (7,400 km; 4,600 mi) at 12 knots (22 km/h; 14 mph)
- Complement: 25 standard, 32 maximum
- Armament: 2 × 12.7 mm (0.5 in) machine guns

HMAS Cape Schanck, formerly Australian Defence Vessel (ADV) Cape Schanck, named after Cape Schanck, is an evolved Cape-class patrol boat of the Royal Australian Navy (RAN).

The ship will be the eighth of ten evolved Cape-class patrol boats to be delivered to the Royal Australian Navy. Prior to Cape Schanck, the RAN already operated the Cape-class patrol boats Cape Fourcroy and Cape Inscription as well as the evolved Cape-class patrol boats Cape Otway, Cape Peron, Cape Naturaliste, Cape Capricorn, Cape Woolamai and Cape Pillar, while Cape Solander was under construction alongside Cape Schanck.

The ship is the second boat of the second order of two evolved Cape-class patrol boats the RAN ordered in April 2022, at a projected cost of $124 million. In November 2023, the RAN ordered a further two evolved Cape-class patrols, at a cost of A$157.1 million.

The ship is being built by Austal in Henderson, Western Australia and was launched in mid-2024. It was delivered to the RAN on 1 November 2024.

The ship was commissioned with sister ship HMAS Cape Solander on 9 May 2025
