= HMAS Cape Solander =

Cape-class patrol boat of the Royal Australian Navy

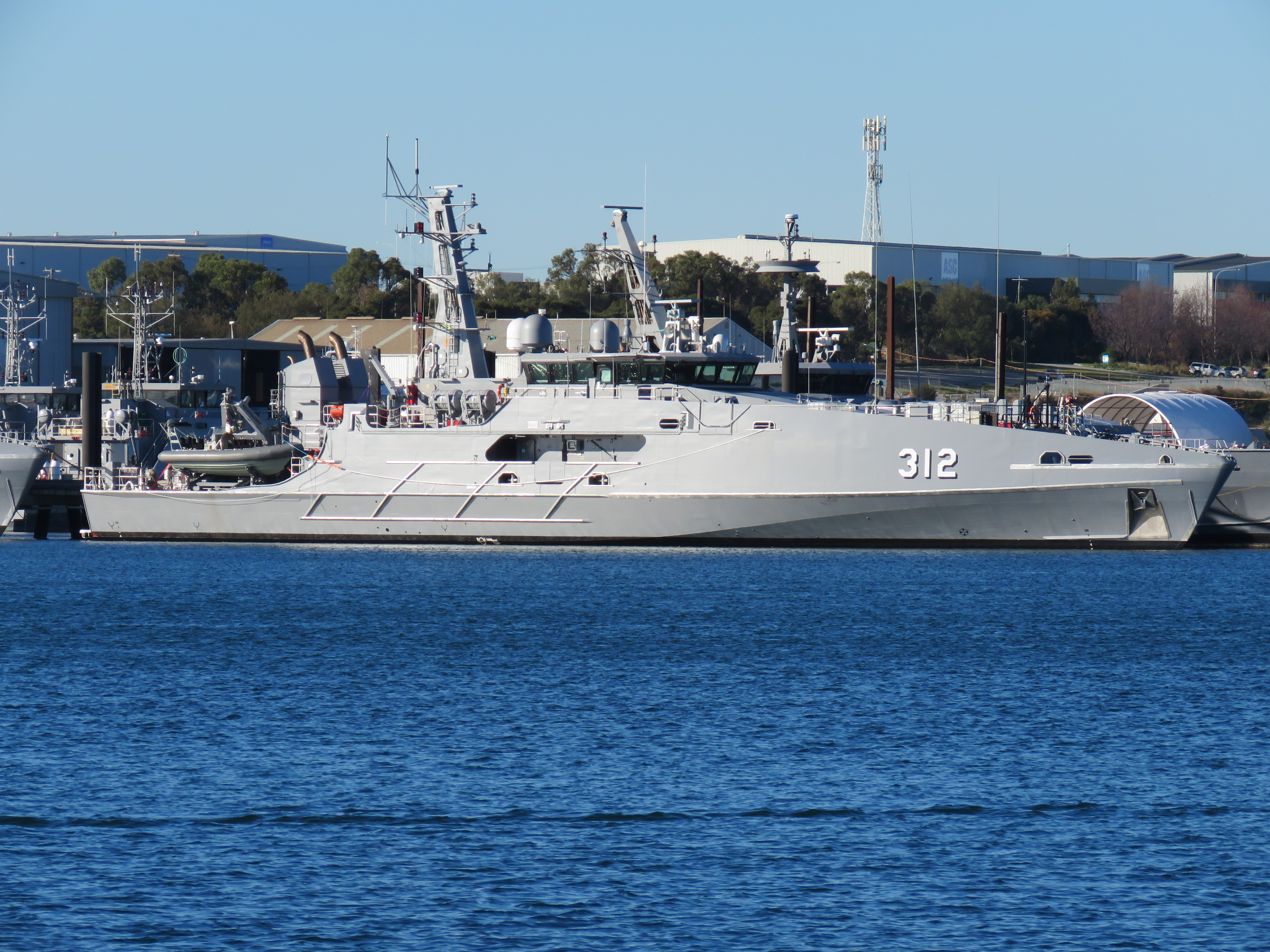
- ADV Cape Solander at Austal shipyards in Henderson, Western Australia in June 2024

History

Australia
- Namesake: Cape Solander
- Builder: Austal, Henderson, Western Australia
- Launched: April 2024
- Commissioned: 9 May 2025
- In service: 1 August 2024
- Home port: HMAS Coonawarra
- Identification: IMO number: 4771932; MMSI number: 503107000; Callsign: VKBW; Pennant number: 312

General characteristics
- Class & type: Cape-class patrol boat
- Length: 58.1 m (190 ft 7 in)
- Beam: 10.6 m (34 ft 9 in)
- Draught: 3.1 m (10 ft 2 in)
- Propulsion: 2 x Caterpillar 3516C diesels 6,770 horsepower (5,050 kW) 2 shafts, 1 bow thruster
- Speed: 26 knots (48 km/h; 30 mph)
- Range: 4,000 nautical miles (7,400 km; 4,600 mi) at 12 knots (22 km/h; 14 mph)
- Complement: 25 standard, 32 maximum
- Armament: 2 × 12.7 mm (0.5 in) machine guns

HMAS Cape Solander, formerly Australian Defence Vessel (ADV) Cape Solander, named after Cape Solander in New South Wales, is an evolved Cape-class patrol boat under construction for the Royal Australian Navy (RAN), launched in April 2024.

The ship will be the seventh of ten evolved Cape-class patrol boats to be delivered to the Royal Australian Navy. Prior to Cape Solander, the RAN already operated the Cape-class patrol boats Cape Fourcroy and Cape Inscription as well as the evolved Cape-class patrol boats Cape Otway, Cape Peron, Cape Naturaliste, Cape Capricorn, Cape Woolamai and Cape Pillar.

The ship is the first of the second order of two evolved Cape-class patrol boats the RAN ordered in April 2022, at a projected cost of $124 million. In November 2023, the RAN ordered a further two evolved Cape-class patrols, at a cost of A$157.1 million.

The ship is being built by Austal in Henderson, Western Australia and was launched in April 2024.

The ship was accepted by the RAN on 1 August 2024.

The ship was commissioned with sister ship HMAS Cape Schanck on 9 May 2025
