= HMAS Cape Pillar =

Cape-class patrol boat of the Royal Australian Navy

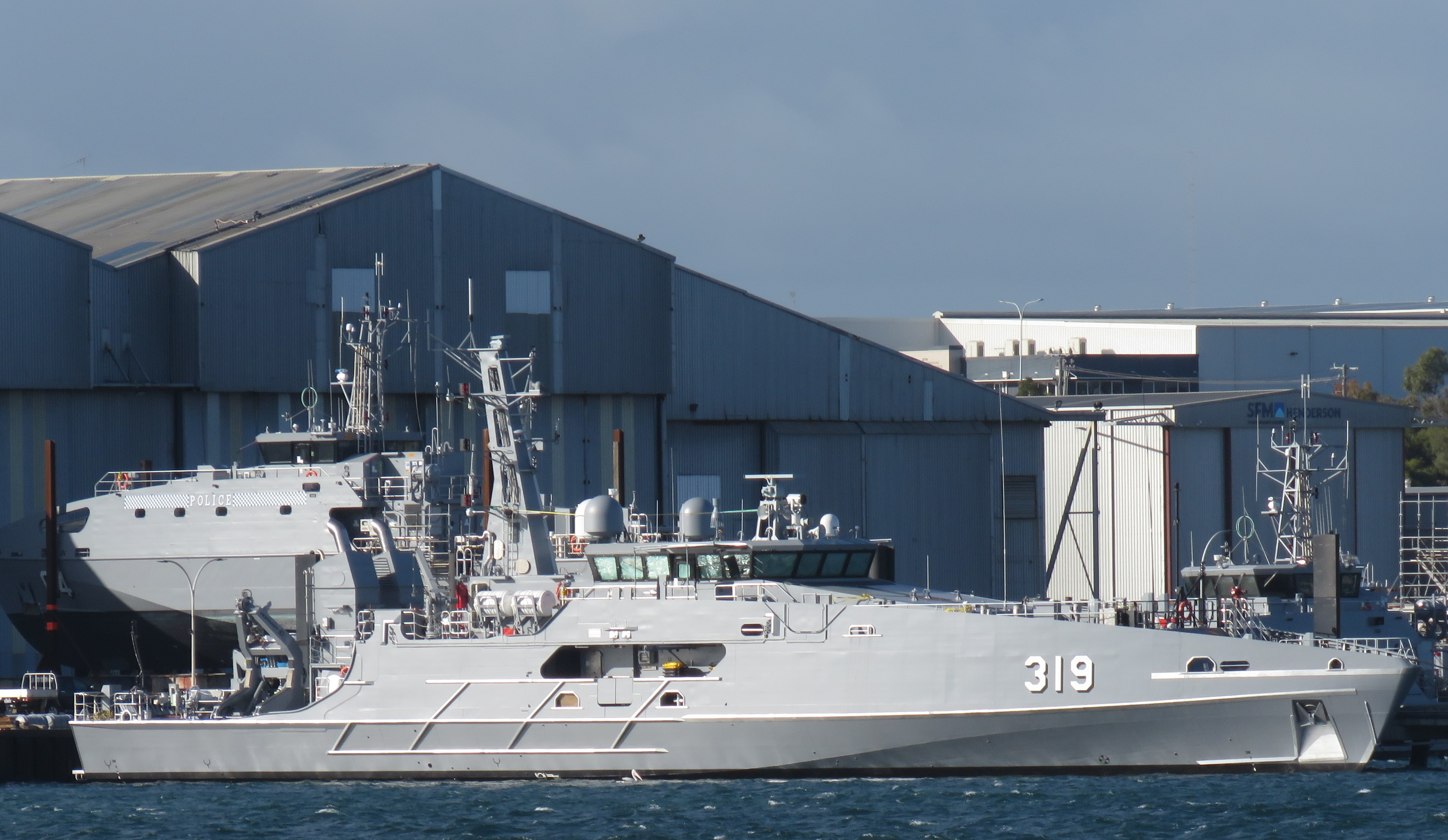
- ADV Cape Pillar at Austal shipyards in Henderson, Western Australia in July 2023

History

Australia
- Namesake: Cape Pillar
- Builder: Austal, Henderson, Western Australia
- Launched: June 2023
- Commissioned: 12 December 2024
- In service: 13 October 2023
- Home port: HMAS Coonawarra
- Identification: IMO number: 4764123; MMSI number: 503106000; Callsign: VKBV; Pennant number: 319
- Motto: Look forward
- Badge

General characteristics
- Class & type: Cape-class patrol boat
- Length: 58.1 m (190 ft 7 in)
- Beam: 10.6 m (34 ft 9 in)
- Draught: 3.1 m (10 ft 2 in)
- Propulsion: 2 x Caterpillar 3516C diesels 6,770 horsepower (5,050 kW) 2 shafts, 1 bow thruster
- Speed: 26 knots (48 km/h; 30 mph)
- Range: 4,000 nautical miles (7,400 km; 4,600 mi) at 12 knots (22 km/h; 14 mph)
- Complement: 25 standard, 32 maximum
- Armament: 2 × 12.7 mm (0.5 in) machine guns

HMAS Cape Pillar, formerly the Australian Defence Vessel (ADV) Cape Pillar, named after Cape Pillar in Tasmania, is an evolved Cape-class patrol boat under construction for the Royal Australian Navy (RAN).

The ship will be the sixth of ten evolved Cape-class patrol boats to be delivered to the Royal Australian Navy. Prior to Cape Pillar, the RAN already operated the Cape-class patrol boats Cape Fourcroy and Cape Inscription as well as the evolved Cape-class patrol boats Cape Otway, Cape Peron, Cape Naturaliste, Cape Capricorn and Cape Woolamai.

The ship is the last of the original six evolved Cape-class patrol boats the RAN ordered in April 2020 to replace the Armidale-class patrol boats in this role, at a projected cost of A$324 million. This order was subsequently expanded by another two boats in April 2022, at an additional projected cost of $124 million. In November 2023, the RAN ordered a further two evolved Cape-class patrols, at a cost of A$157.1 million.

The ship is being built by Austal in Henderson, Western Australia and was launched in June 2023.

She was accepted on 13 October 2023 and is to be based at HMAS Coonawarra in Darwin, Northern Territory The ship was officially welcomed at HMAS Coonawarra on 8 February 2024.

On 12 December 2024, four of the Cape-class vessels were commissioned into the Royal Australian Navy, one of them the Cape Pillar.
