= HMAS Cape Woolamai =

Cape-class patrol boat of the Royal Australian Navy

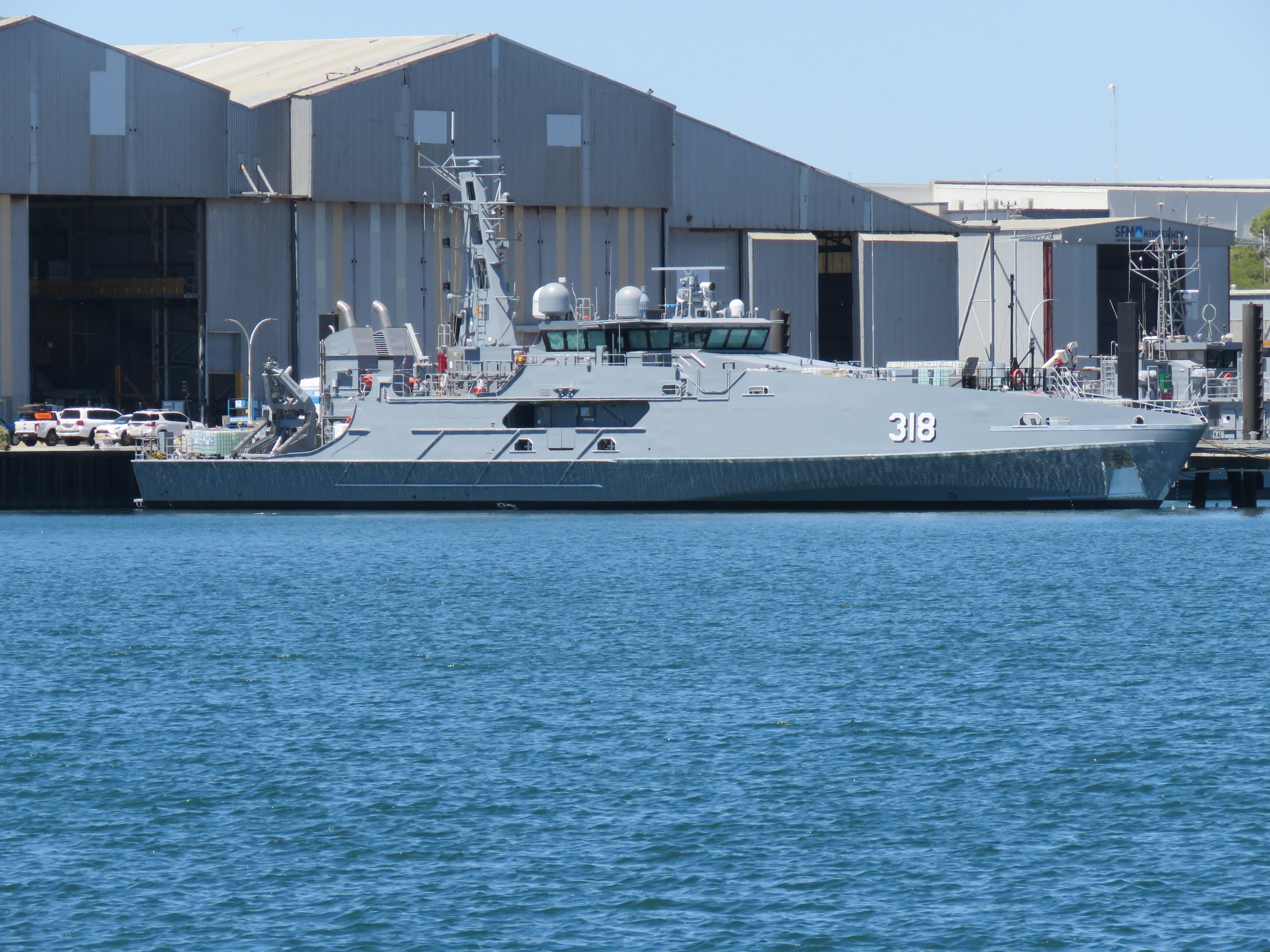
- ADV Cape Woolamai at Austal shipyards in Henderson, Western Australia in February 2023

History

Australia
- Namesake: Cape Woolamai
- Builder: Austal, Henderson, Western Australia
- Commissioned: 12 December 2024
- In service: 22 June 2023
- Home port: HMAS Coonawarra
- Identification: IMO number: 4764111; MMSI number: 503105000; Callsign: VKBU; Pennant number: 318
- Motto: Intrepid
- Badge

General characteristics
- Class & type: Cape-class patrol boat
- Length: 58.1 m (190 ft 7 in)
- Beam: 10.6 m (34 ft 9 in)
- Draught: 3.1 m (10 ft 2 in)
- Propulsion: 2 × Caterpillar 3516C diesels 6,770 hp (5,050 kW) 2 shafts, 1 bow thruster
- Speed: 26 knots (48 km/h; 30 mph)
- Range: 4,000 nmi (7,400 km; 4,600 mi) at 12 knots (22 km/h; 14 mph)
- Complement: 25 standard, 32 maximum
- Armament: 2 × 12.7 mm (0.5 in) machine guns

HMAS Cape Woolamai, formerly the Australian Defence Vessel (ADV) Cape Woolamai, named after Cape Woolamai in Victoria, is an evolved Cape-class patrol boat of the Royal Australian Navy (RAN).

The ship is the fifth of ten evolved Cape-class patrol boats to be delivered to the Royal Australian Navy. Prior to Cape Woolamai, the RAN already operated the Cape-class patrol boats Cape Fourcroy and Cape Inscription as well as the evolved Cape-class patrol boats Cape Otway, Cape Peron, Cape Naturaliste and Cape Capricorn.

The ship was built by Austal in Henderson, Western Australia, accepted on 22 June 2023 and is to be based at HMAS Coonawarra in Darwin, Northern Territory.

The ship is one of the original six evolved Cape-class patrol boats the RAN ordered in April 2020 to replace the Armidale-class patrol boats in this role, at a projected cost of A$324 million. This order was subsequently expanded by another two boats in April 2022, at an additional projected cost of $124 million. In November 2023, the RAN ordered a further two evolved Cape-class patrols, at a cost of A$157.1 million.

On 12 December 2024, four of the Cape-class vessels were commissioned into the Royal Australian Navy, one of them the Cape Woolamai.
