= HMAS Cape Capricorn =

Cape-class patrol boat of the Royal Australian Navy

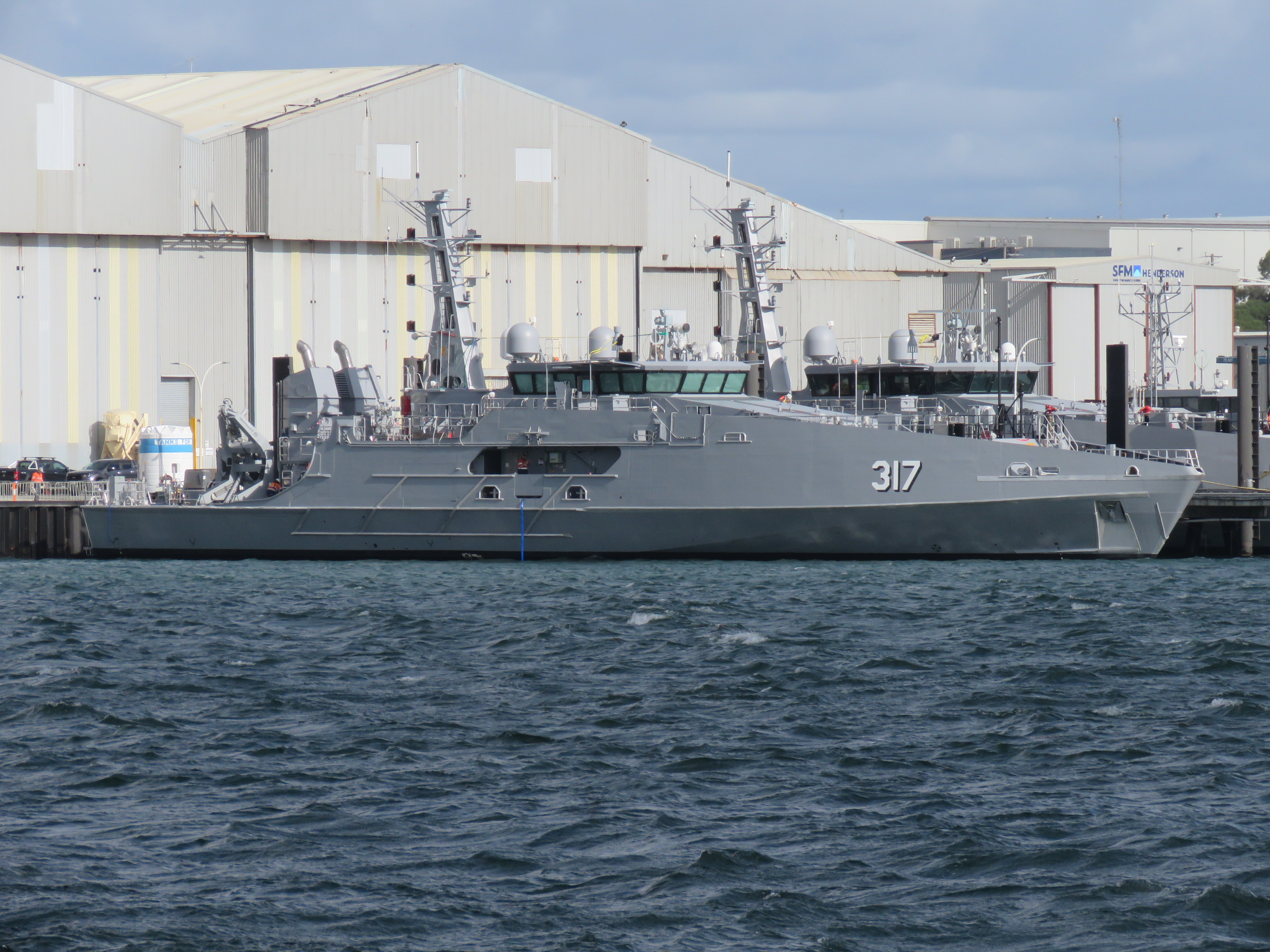
- ADV Cape Capricorn at Austal shipyards in Henderson, Western Australia in October 2022

History

Australia
- Namesake: Cape Capricorn
- Builder: Austal, Henderson, Western Australia
- Commissioned: 12 December 2024
- In service: 13 February 2023
- Home port: HMAS Coonawarra
- Identification: IMO number: 4764109; MMSI number: 503104000; Callsign: VKBT; Pennant number: 317
- Motto: Nothing untried
- Badge

General characteristics
- Class & type: Cape-class patrol boat
- Length: 58.1 m (190 ft 7 in)
- Beam: 10.6 m (34 ft 9 in)
- Draught: 3.1 m (10 ft 2 in)
- Propulsion: 2 x Caterpillar 3516C diesels 6,770 horsepower (5,050 kW) 2 shafts, 1 bow thruster
- Speed: 26 knots (48 km/h; 30 mph)
- Range: 4,000 nmi (7,400 km; 4,600 mi) at 12 knots (22 km/h; 14 mph)
- Complement: 25 standard, 32 maximum
- Armament: 2 × 12.7 mm (0.5 in) machine guns

HMAS Cape Capricorn, formerly the Australian Defence Vessel (ADV) Cape Capricorn, named after Cape Capricorn in Queensland, is an evolved Cape-class patrol boat of the Royal Australian Navy (RAN).

The ship is the fourth of ten evolved Cape-class patrol boats to be delivered to the Royal Australian Navy. Prior to Cape Capricorn, the RAN already operated the Cape-class patrol boats Cape Fourcroy and Cape Inscription as well as the evolved Cape-class patrol boats Cape Otway, Cape Peron and Cape Naturaliste.

The ship was built by Austal in Henderson, Western Australia, accepted on 13 February 2023 and based at HMAS Coonawarra in Darwin, Northern Territory. Cape Capricorn was officially welcomed in Darwin in June 2023, alongside her sister ship Cape Naturaliste, becoming the first evolved Cape-class patrol boats to be based there. The patrol boat's primary duty lies in fisheries protection, immigration, customs and drug law enforcement operations.

The ship is one of the original six evolved Cape-class patrol boats the RAN ordered in April 2020 to replace the Armidale-class patrol boats in this role, at a projected cost of A$324 million. This order was subsequently expanded by another two boats in April 2022, at an additional projected cost of $124 million. In November 2023, the RAN ordered a further two evolved Cape-class patrols, at a cost of A$157.1 million.

On 12 December 2024, four of the Cape class vessels were commissioned into the Royal Australian Navy, one of them the Cape Capricorn.
