= Cape-class patrol boat =

Class of patrol boat

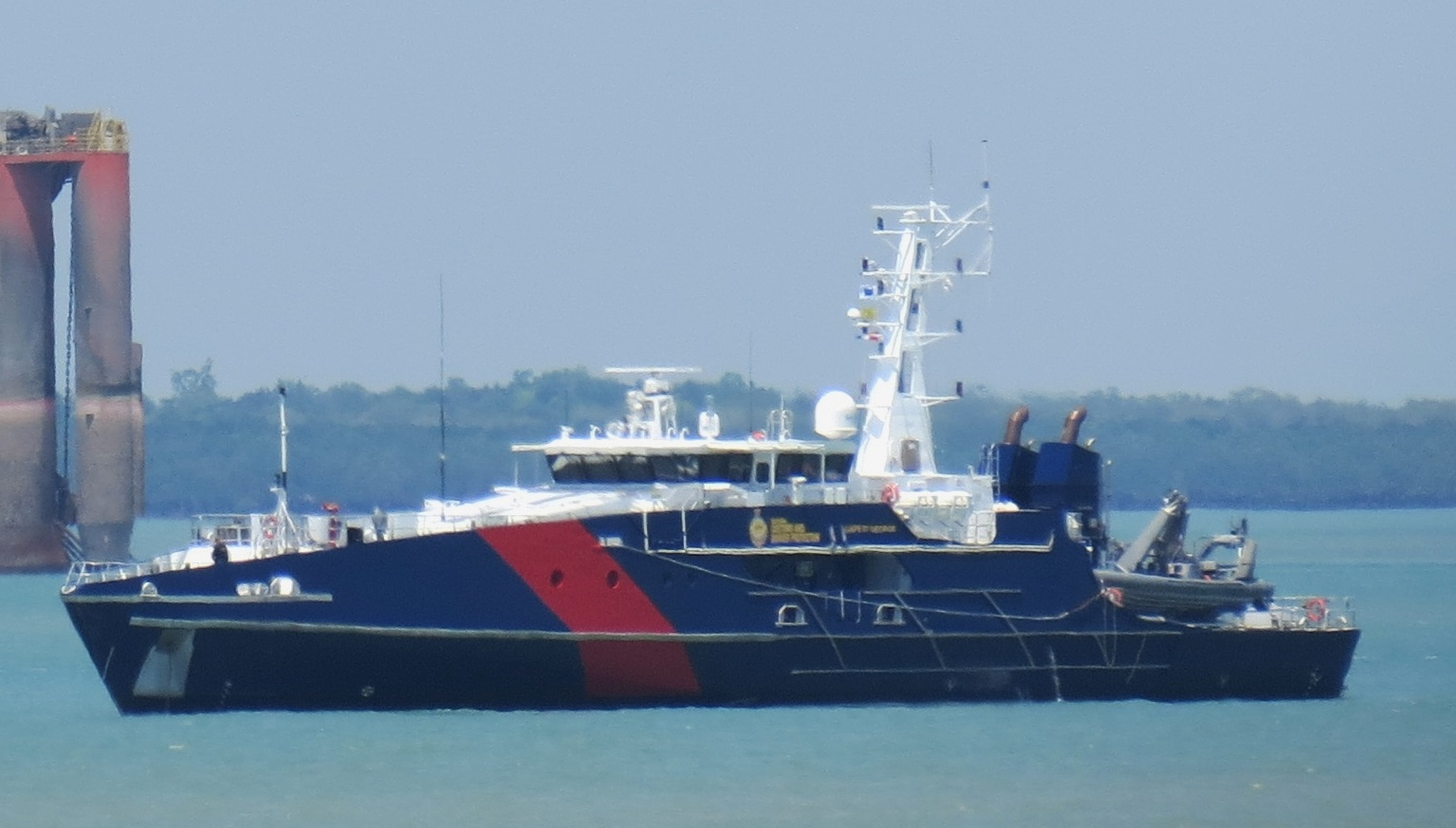
- ABFC Cape St George on Darwin Harbour in 2014

Class overview
- Name: Cape class
- Builders: Austal
- Operators: Australian Border Force; Royal Australian Navy; Trinidad and Tobago Coast Guard
- Preceded by: Bay class (ABF); Armidale class (RAN)
- Cost: AU$54 million (US$40.6 million) per unit (FY 2020)
- Built: 2011–2017 (8 allocated to ABF and 2 to RAN); 2018–present (2 allocated to TTCG, 10 to RAN and 2 to ABF)
- In service: 2013–present
- Planned: 28
- Completed: 22
- Active: 20
- Laid up: 2

General characteristics
- Type: Patrol boat
- Displacement: 400 Tonnes
- Length: 57.8 m (189 ft 8 in)
- Beam: 10.3 m (33 ft 10 in)
- Draught: 3 m (9 ft 10 in)
- Propulsion: 2 x Caterpillar 3516C main engines with output of 2,525 kW (3,386 hp) at 1,800 rpm; 2 x ZF 9055A gearboxes; 2 x fixed pitch propellers; HRP 2001 TT 160 kW (210 hp) bow thruster for high manoeuvrability.
- Speed: 25 knots (46 km/h; 29 mph)
- Range: 4,000 nmi (7,400 km; 4,600 mi) at 12 knots (22 km/h; 14 mph)
- Endurance: 28 days
- Boats & landing craft carried: 2 × 7.3 m (23 ft 11 in) Gemini RHIBs; 1 × small boat
- Crew: 18
- Sensors & processing systems: 2 electronic chart display and information systems (ECDIS); 2 gyro compasses; 2 differential global positioning systems (DGPS); 1 secure marine automatic identification system (AIS-S); 1 electro-optical sensor system (EOSS); 2 Bridgemaster navigation radars; 1 voyage data recorder (VDR)
- Armament: 1x 20mm-30mm RCWS FFBNW; 2x .50cal machine guns crew-served

The Cape-class is a ship class of 28 large patrol boats operated by the Marine Unit of the Australian Border Force (ABF), the Royal Australian Navy (RAN) and the Trinidad and Tobago Coast Guard. First ordered in 2011, the vessels were built by Austal to replace Customs' Bay-class patrol boats, and entered service from 2013 onwards. Follow on orders were made in 2015 then 2018 by the RAN to augment, then eventually replace its Armidale class patrol boats. More orders were then made by the ABF from 2024 onwards to replace the remaining Bay class patrol boats and expand its patrol boat force.

== Design and construction ==
The Bay class was due to be replaced in 2010, but it was not until June of that year that a request for tender was issued for eight new, larger patrol boats. Austal was awarded the tender for eight patrol boats on 12 August 2011. Each vessel is 57.8 m (189 ft 8 in) in length, with a beam of 10.3 m (33 ft 10 in) and a draught of 3 m (9 ft 10 in). Propulsion machinery consists of two Caterpillar 3516C diesel engines, providing 5,050 kW (6,770 hp) to two propeller shafts. A 160 kW (210 hp) bow thruster is also fitted. Maximum speed is 25 knots (46 km/h; 29 mph), with a range of 4,000 nautical miles (7,400 km; 4,600 mi) at 12 knots (22 km/h; 14 mph), and an endurance of 28 days. Each vessel has a crew of 18, and two crew groups are assigned to each vessel, alternating between operating the patrol boat and shore duties, to ensure maximum vessel availability. Each Cape-class vessel is armed with two 0.50 M2HB-QCB calibre machine guns, and carries two 7.3 m (24 ft) Gemini RHIB interception craft in cradles at the stern, along with a small boat carried amidships. Several updates and reconfigurations were implemented in response to issues found with the previous class of patrol boats built by Austal, the Armidale class operated by the Royal Australian Navy (RAN).

According to media reports, prior to the tender process, information about the project was leaked to Austal by a senior Customs official. The leak was reported to occur during an investigation of claims that the tendering requirements had been set up to favour Austal. Customs stated in March 2013 that reports of leaks during the tendering process were unfounded, and that internal and external investigations of the accusation concluded that the tender process had not been compromised or set up to favour a particular tenderer.

Construction of the new vessels started in February 2012, with entry into service planned for between March 2013 and August 2015. The first vessel was launched in January 2013, and named Cape St. George on 15 March 2013. The boats have been named after eight capes in Australia: Cape St. George, Cape Byron, Cape Nelson, Cape Sorell, Cape Jervis, Cape Leveque, Cape Wessel, and Cape York. The final vessel, Cape York, was delivered at the end of August 2015. The project cost A$330 million, including in-service support to be provided by Austal: the largest procurement undertaken by the Customs and Border Protection Service. Although originally due to leave service in 2010, ships of the Bay class remained in service until the Cape class fully entered service. In Australian service, the patrol boats were initially identified with the ship prefix "ACV" (Australian Customs Vessel); this was changed to "ABFC" (Australian Border Force Cutter) following the establishment of the Australian Border Force.

On 13 December 2015, Austal announced that two more Cape-class vessels had been ordered. The $63 million contract is with the National Australia Bank, who will charter the patrol boats to the Department of Defence on their completion in mid-2017. The new vessels will be included in the in-service support contract for the Border Force patrol boats, and if Defence does not continue on with the charter after the initial three-year period, the National Australia Bank can sell the patrol boats back to Austal for residual value. The two vessels, Cape Fourcroy and Cape Inscription, are in service.

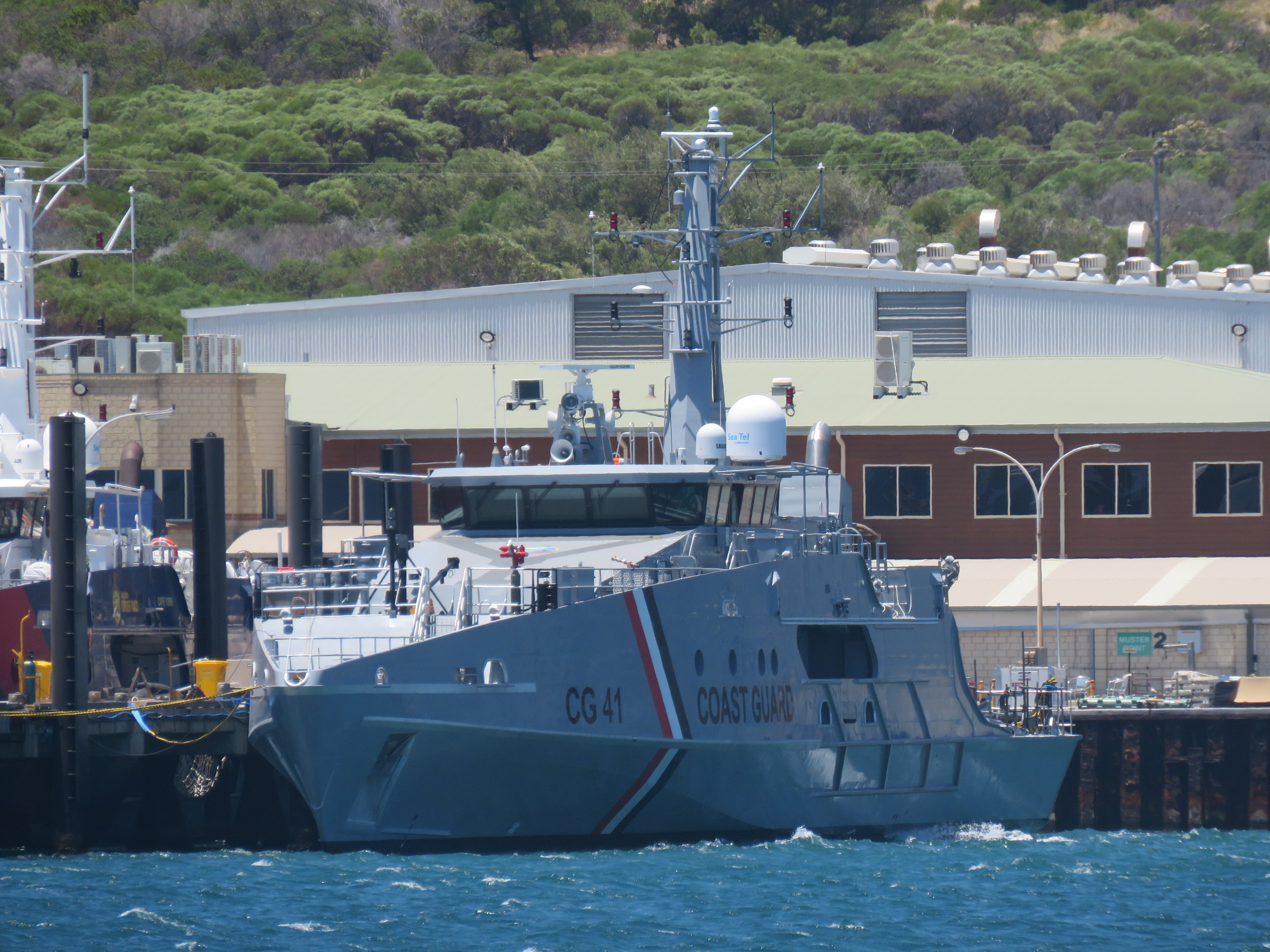
Cape-class patrol boat of the Trinidad and Tobago Coast Guard, shortly after its launch in December 2020

In July 2018, the government of Trinidad and Tobago announced the acquisition of two Cape-class patrol boats. The vessels will enhance the border protection capabilities of the country in conjunction with the existing Coast Guard fleet, and will join six Austal Fast Patrol Craft acquired in 2009. The vessels' names were taken from two of the three cancelled Port of Spain-class offshore patrol vessels.

In May 2020, the RAN placed an order for six Evolved Cape-class patrol boats. The ECCPB has several enhancements and increased crew capacity from 22 to 32 people. In April 2022, the RAN ordered two additional ECCPBs. Austal delivered the first of the Evolved Cape-class Cape Otway to the RAN in March 2022. In November 2023, the RAN ordered two new vessels to replace and significantly enhance the RAN's at-sea navigation and seamanship training capability, for a total of ten of the ECCPB design.

In December 2024, the ABF ordered two ECCPBs to replace its remaining two Bay-class patrol boats. A year later, on 19 December 2025, a further two ECCPBs were ordered for the ABF.

== Operational history ==
Permanent berthing facilities at East Arm Wharf in Port Darwin (the ship's main base of operations) were commissioned in December 2015 and became fully operational in February 2016.

Following availability issues with the Armidale class, Cape Byron and Cape Nelson were chartered by the RAN from July 2015 to the end of 2016 to supplement naval patrol boat availability. In naval service, the patrol boats are crewed by RAN personnel, operate from HMAS Cairns, and are identified with the Australian Defence Vessel (ADV) prefix, but retain the blue-and-red Australian Border Force colour scheme.

In December 2024, four ships, Cape Pillar, Cape Naturaliste, Cape Woolamai and Cape Capricorn were commissioned as His Majesty’s Australian Ships reflecting their extended planned service lives.

In May 2025, two more vessels, Cape Solander and Cape Schanck were also commissioned.

On 27 August 2026, two more vessels, Cape Spencer and Cape Hawke were also commissioned.

== Ships in class ==
Prefix	Name	Pennant	Builder	Status	Image	Notes
Australian Border Force (12)
ABFC	Cape St. George		Austal, Henderson	Active		
ABFC	Cape Byron		Austal, Henderson	Active		
ABFC	Cape Nelson		Austal, Henderson	Active		
ABFC	Cape Sorell		Austal, Henderson	Active		
ABFC	Cape Jervis		Austal, Henderson	Active		
ABFC	Cape Leveque		Austal, Henderson	Active		
ABFC	Cape Wessel		Austal, Henderson	Active		
ABFC	Cape York		Austal, Henderson	Active		
ABFC	Cape Denison		Austal, Henderson	Under construction		Evolved Cape design
ABFC			Austal, Henderson	Under construction		Evolved Cape design
ABFC			Austal, Henderson	Ordered		Evolved Cape design
ABFC			Austal, Henderson	Ordered		Evolved Cape design
ABFC			Austal, Henderson	Ordered		Evolved Cape design
ABFC			Austal, Henderson	Ordered		Evolved Cape design
Royal Australian Navy (12)
ADV	Cape Fourcroy	310	Austal, Henderson	Out of service		
ADV	Cape Inscription	320	Austal, Henderson	Out of service		
ADV	Cape Otway	P314	Austal, Henderson	Active (as navigational training vessel)		Evolved Cape design
ADV	Cape Peron	P315	Austal, Henderson	Active		Evolved Cape design
HMAS	Cape Naturaliste	P316	Austal, Henderson	Active		Evolved Cape design
HMAS	Cape Capricorn	P317	Austal, Henderson	Active		Evolved Cape design
HMAS	Cape Woolamai	P318	Austal, Henderson	Active		Evolved Cape design
HMAS	Cape Pillar	P319	Austal, Henderson	Active		Evolved Cape design
HMAS	Cape Solander	P312	Austal, Henderson	Active		Evolved Cape design
HMAS	Cape Schanck	P313	Austal, Henderson	Active		Evolved Cape design
HMAS	Cape Spencer	P225	Austal, Henderson	Active		Evolved Cape design
HMAS	Cape Hawke	P226	Austal, Henderson	Active		Evolved Cape design
Trinidad and Tobago Coast Guard (2)
TTS	Port of Spain	CG41	Austal, Henderson	Active		
TTS	Scarborough	CG42	Austal, Henderson	Active		
