= ABFC Cape Wessel =

Cape-class patrol boat of the Australian Border Force

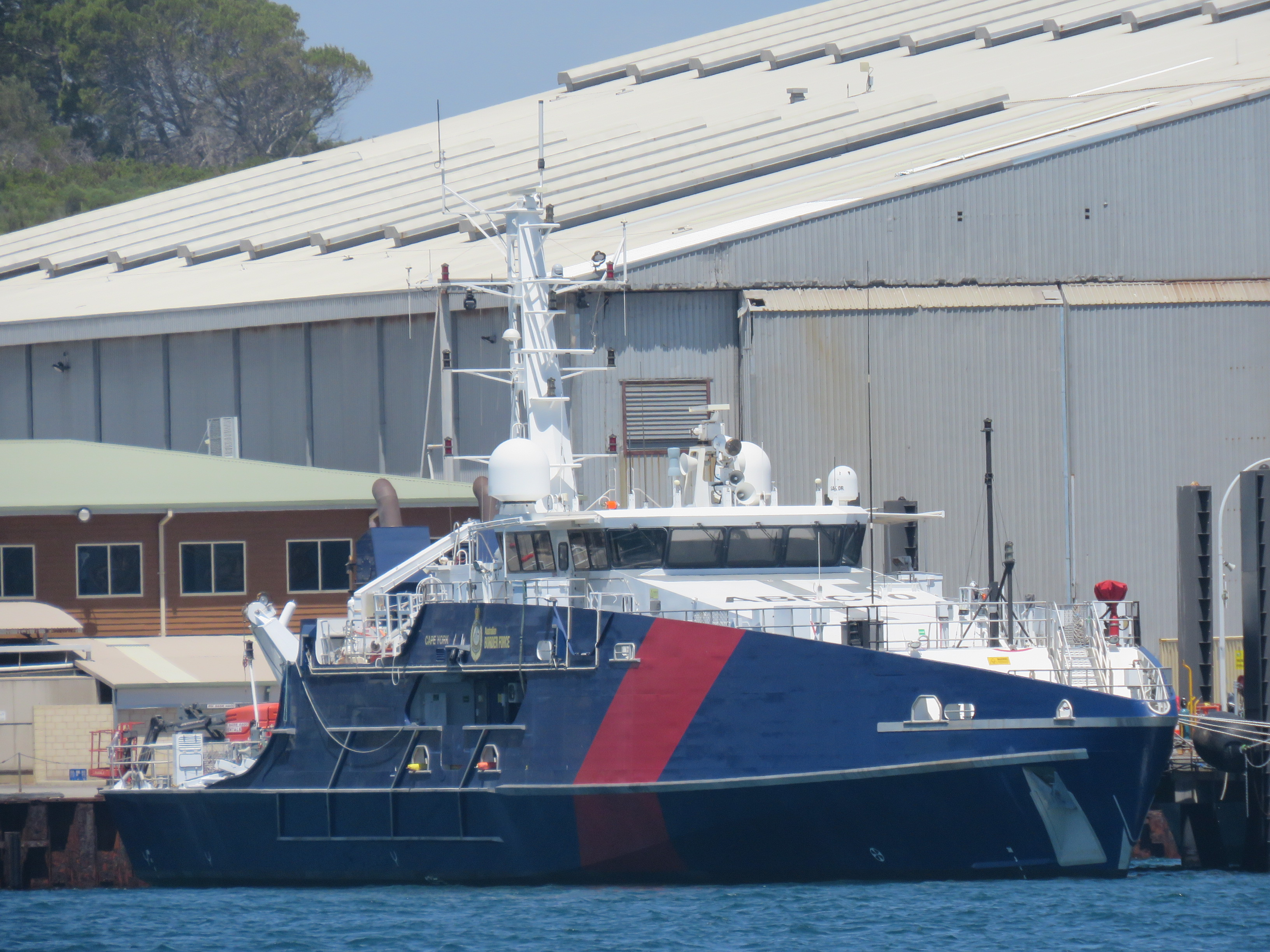
- ABFC Cape York, sister ship of Cape Wessel, at Austal shipyards in Henderson, Western Australia in December 2020

History

Australia
- Namesake: Cape Wessel
- Builder: Austal, Henderson, Western Australia
- Commissioned: 2015
- Identification: IMO number: 9684615; MMSI number: 503000010; Callsign: VHJS

General characteristics
- Class & type: Cape-class patrol boat
- Length: 57.8 m (189 ft 8 in)
- Beam: 10.3 m (33 ft 10 in)
- Draught: 3 m (9 ft 10 in)
- Propulsion: 2 x Caterpillar 3516C main engines with output of 2,525 kW (3,386 hp)
- Speed: 25 knots (46 km/h; 29 mph)
- Range: 4,000 nmi (7,400 km; 4,600 mi) at 12 knots (22 km/h; 14 mph)
- Complement: 18
- Armament: 2 × 12.7 mm (0.5 in) machine guns

ABFC Cape Wessel, named after Cape Wessel in the Northern Territory, is a Cape-class patrol boat of the marine unit of the Australian Border Force.

The ship was the seventh of eight Cape-class patrol boats to be delivered to the Australian Border Force. The boat, built by Austal in Henderson, Western Australia, had its keel laid in July 2014 and delivered in August 2015.

Austal was awarded a $350 million contract to construct eight Cape-class patrol boats for the Australian Border Force to replace the Bay-class patrol boats in 2011, with the eight boats delivered between 2013 and 2015.
