= ABFC Cape Jervis =

Cape-class patrol boat of the Australian Border Force

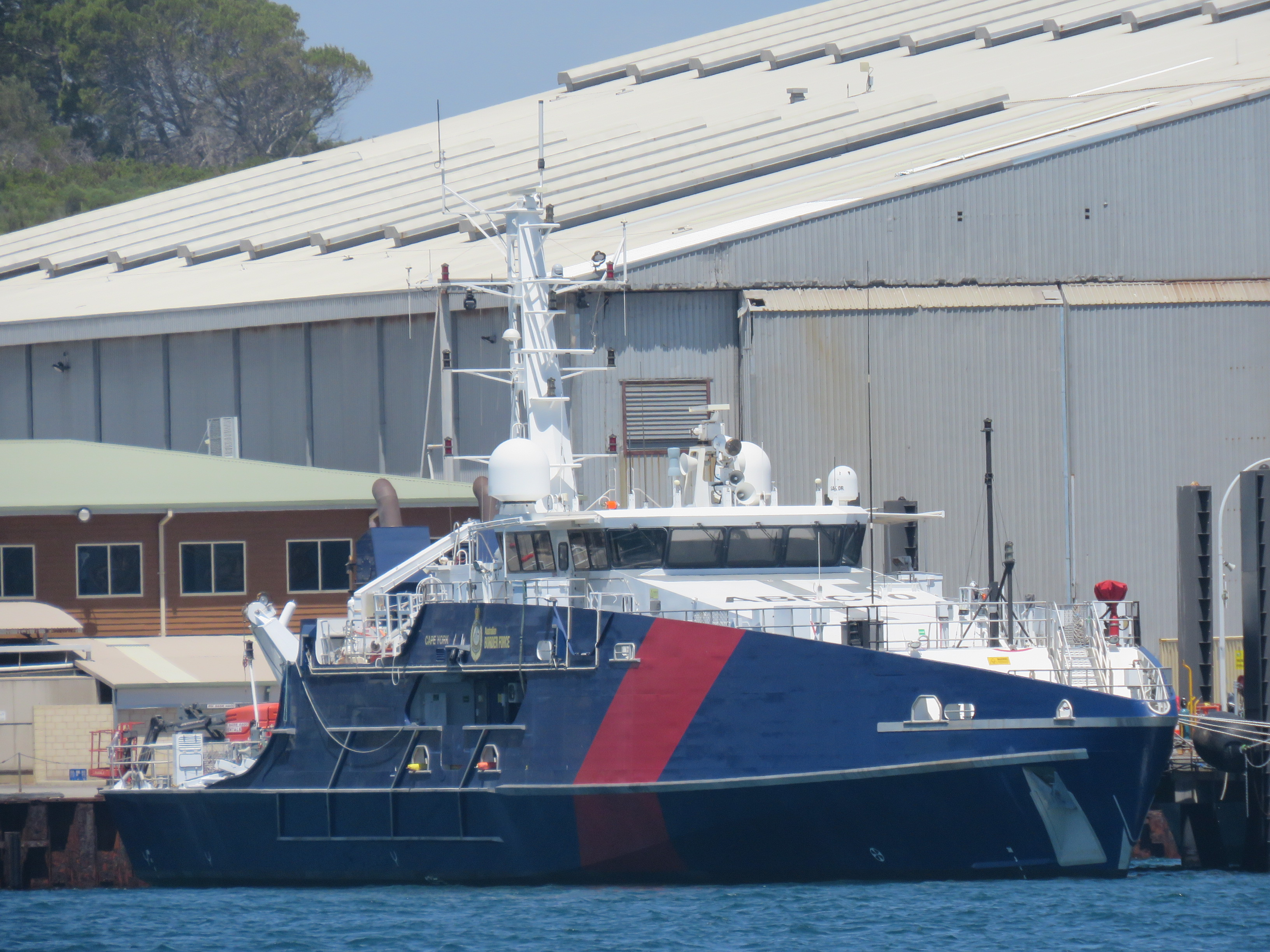
- ABFC Cape York, sister ship of Cape Jervis, at Austal shipyards in Henderson, Western Australia in December 2020

History

Australia
- Namesake: Cape Jervis
- Builder: Austal, Henderson, Western Australia
- Commissioned: 2015
- Identification: IMO number: 9684598; MMSI number: 503000012; Callsign: VNKS

General characteristics
- Class & type: Cape-class patrol boat
- Length: 57.8 m (189 ft 8 in)
- Beam: 10.3 m (33 ft 10 in)
- Draught: 3 m (9 ft 10 in)
- Propulsion: 2 x Caterpillar 3516C main engines with output of 2,525 kW (3,386 hp)
- Speed: 25 knots (46 km/h; 29 mph)
- Range: 4,000 nmi (7,400 km; 4,600 mi) at 12 knots (22 km/h; 14 mph)
- Complement: 18
- Armament: 2 × 12.7 mm (0.5 in) machine guns

ABFC Cape Jervis, named after Cape Jervis in South Australia, is a Cape-class patrol boat of the marine unit of the Australian Border Force.

The ship was the fifth of eight Cape-class patrol boats to be delivered to the Australian Border Force. The boat, built by Austal in Henderson, Western Australia, had its keel laid in January 2014, was launched in October 2014 and was delivered in March 2015.

Austal was awarded a $350 million contract to construct eight Cape-class patrol boats for the Australian Border Force to replace the Bay-class patrol boats in 2011, with the eight boats delivered between 2013 and 2015.
