= ABFC Cape Sorell =

Cape-class patrol boat of the Australian Border Force

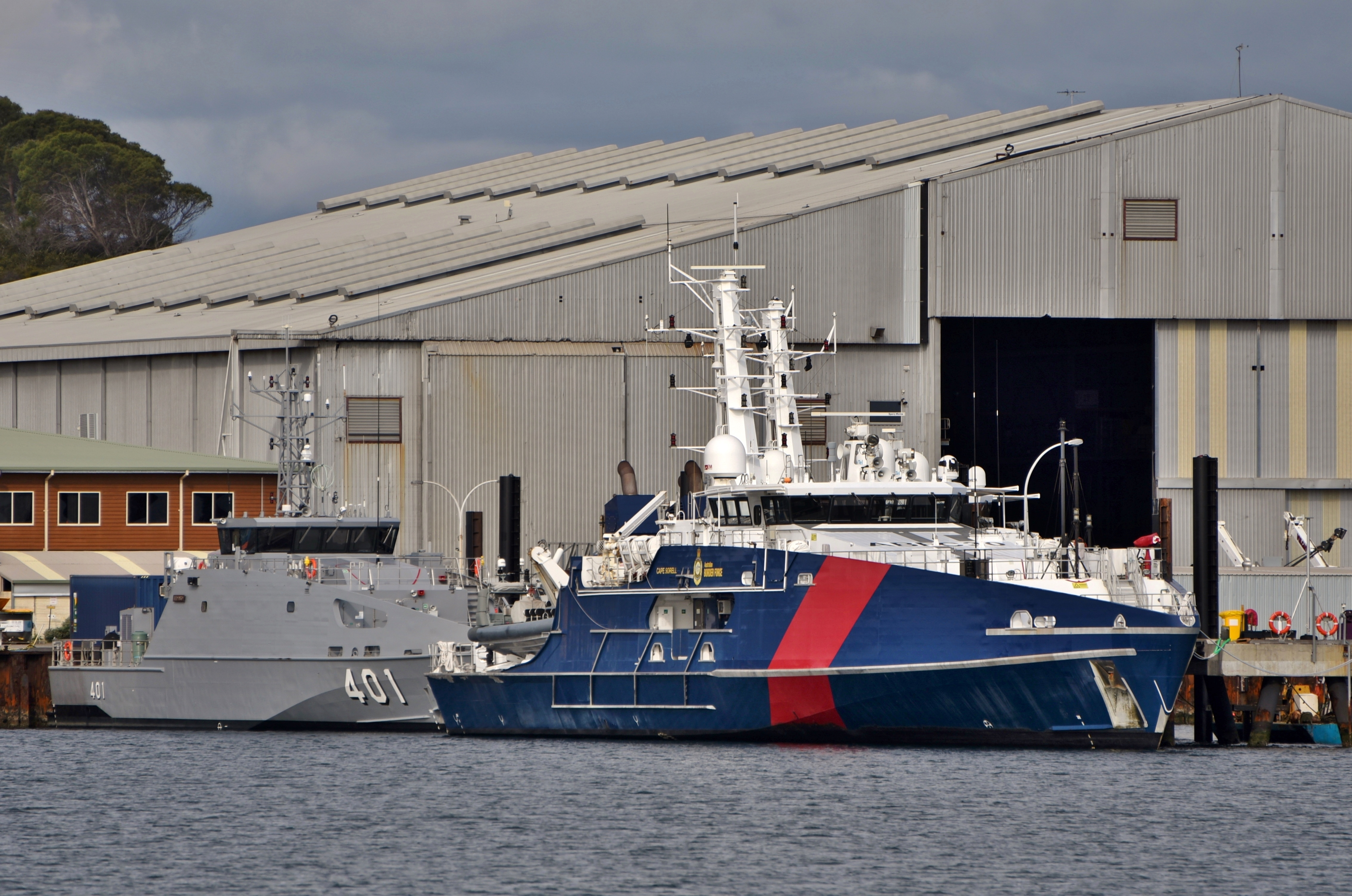
- ABFC Cape Sorell at Austal shipyards in Henderson, Western Australia in September 2018, with the Guardian-class patrol boat HMPNGS Ted Diro in the background

History

Australia
- Namesake: Cape Sorell
- Builder: Austal, Henderson, Western Australia
- Commissioned: 2014
- Identification: IMO number: 9684586; MMSI number: 503007250; Callsign: VHOV

General characteristics
- Class & type: Cape-class patrol boat
- Length: 57.8 m (189 ft 8 in)
- Beam: 10.3 m (33 ft 10 in)
- Draught: 3 m (9 ft 10 in)
- Propulsion: 2 x Caterpillar 3516C main engines with output of 2,525 kW (3,386 hp)
- Speed: 25 knots (46 km/h; 29 mph)
- Range: 4,000 nmi (7,400 km; 4,600 mi) at 12 knots (22 km/h; 14 mph)
- Complement: 18
- Armament: 2 × 12.7 mm (0.5 in) machine guns

ABFC Cape Sorell, named after Cape Sorell in Tasmania, is a Cape-class patrol boat of the marine unit of the Australian Border Force.

The ship was the fourth of eight Cape-class patrol boats to be delivered to the Australian Border Force. The boat, built by Austal in Henderson, Western Australia, had its keel laid in November 2013, was launched in August 2014 and delivered the following December.

Austal was awarded a $350 million contract to construct eight Cape-class patrol boats for the Australian Border Force to replace the Bay-class patrol boats in 2011, with the eight boats delivered between 2013 and 2015.
