= Marine Unit (Australian Border Force) =

Division of the Australian Border Force which acts as a Coast Guard

ABF Marine Unit
- ABF flag
- Active: 2015 – present
- Country: Australia
- Agency: Australian Border Force
- Type: Coast guard
- Role: Law enforcement; Customs; Coast guard; Maritime safety; Fisheries
- Part of: Maritime Border Command
- Headquarters: Canberra, Australia
- Abbreviation: ABF MU

Commanders
- Current commander: Commander Claire Rees (Acting)

Equipment
- Boats: 12 major ships 13 patrol boats

Website
- https://www.abf.gov.au/about-us/what-we-do/border-protection/maritime

The Marine Unit, formerly the Australian Customs Service National Marine Unit, is a division of the Australian Border Force (ABF) which acts as a coast guard for Australia's coastline and territorial waters. The Marine Unit focuses on surveillance and response activities within the Australian Exclusive Economic Zone, and the operation and training of ships and crews for these purposes.

== Operations ==
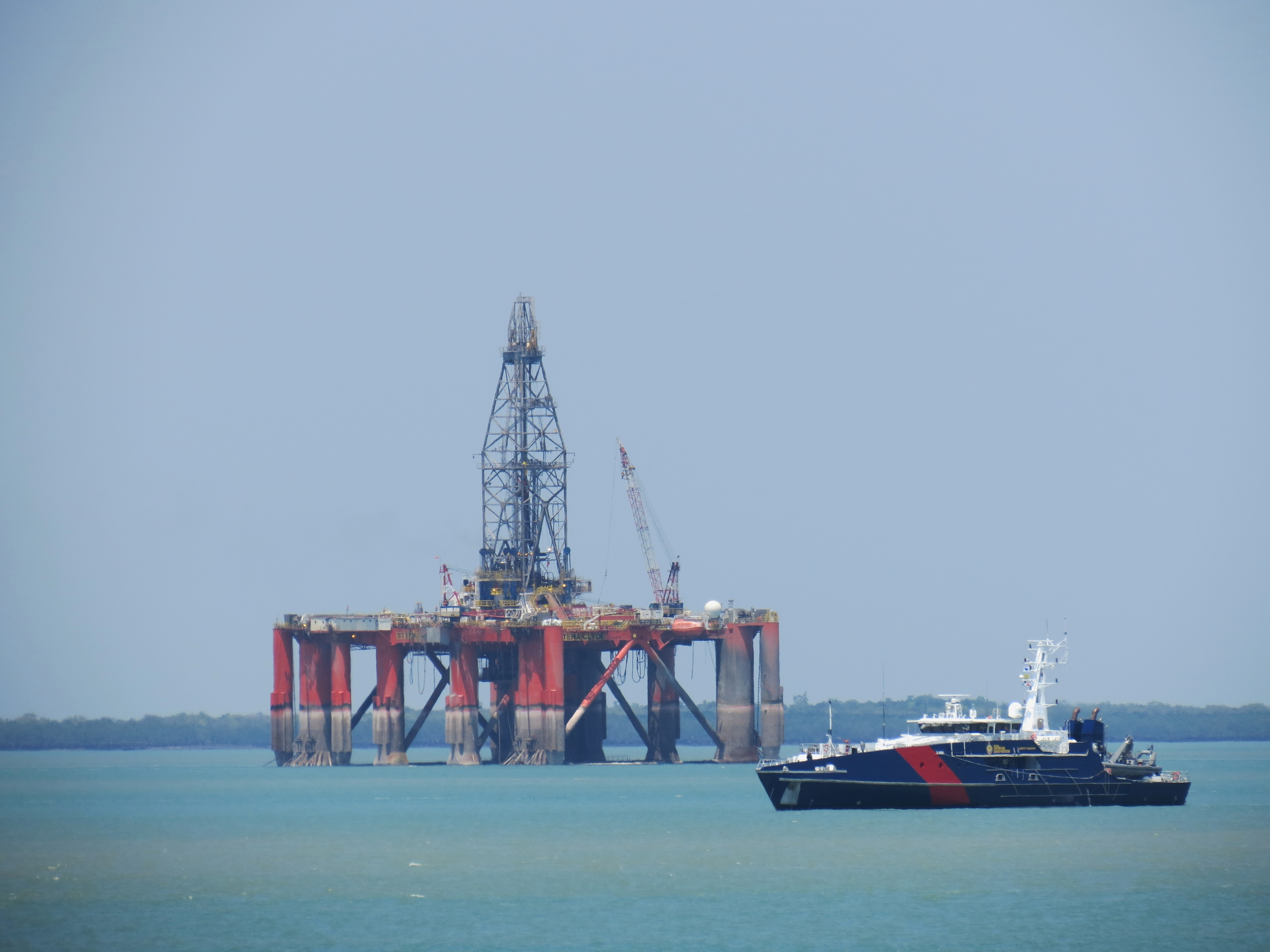
ABFC Cape St. George patrolling an offshore oil platform

The CMU and the Border Protection Division (formerly known as Coastwatch) make up the Customs contribution to Maritime Border Command, a joint command with the Australian Defence Force and incorporating assets from the Australian Fisheries Management Authority, the Australian Quarantine and Inspection Service, and state-level agencies. Maritime Border Command is responsible for protecting Australia's maritime areas, offshore assets, and external territories from threats, including the exploitation of natural resources, people smuggling, importation or exportation of drugs and other illegal items, piracy, and terrorism.

== Facilities ==
The ABF maintains a permanent base of operations for the Marine Unit at the Port Darwin East Arm Wharf.

== Ships ==
Ships operated by the CMU have been given the prefix Australian Border Force Cutter (ABFC) since the creation of the ABF. Ships were previously referred to as Australian Customs Vessels (ACVs).

=== Current ships ===
The largest ship in the ABF fleet is the 110.9-metre (364 ft) offshore patrol vessel ABFC Ocean Shield, which entered service in June 2012 and is a sister ship to ADV Ocean Protector. ABFC Thaiyak is a unique 40-metre (130 ft) vessel delivered in June 2014, intended to replace the ACV Ashmore Guardian for use around the Ashmore and Cartier Islands. In addition, charter arrangements give the ABF access to an additional twenty vessels of various sizes and types; these are called on when required to transport apprehended foreign fishermen and illegal entrants, or tow captured vessels. The ABF announced life extension work for two remaining Bay-class patrol boats and mid-life cycle works for the Cape-class patrol boats.

Current fleet
Image	Class	Name	Type	Entered service	Details
ABFC Ocean Shield, Ocean Shield	N/A	Ocean Shield	Sealift, offshore patrol	2012	Previously operated by the Royal Australian Navy.
ABFC Thaiyak, Thaiyak	N/A	Thaiyak	Long term Ashmore capability (LTAC)	2014	Primarily stationed at the Ashmore and Cartier Islands.
	Flex Fighter Max armoured security boat	Manticore	Offshore patrol	2025	Chartered by the Australian Border Force.
	Flex Fighter Max armoured security boat	Leviathan	Offshore patrol	2025	Chartered by the Australian Border Force.
	Flex Fighter Max armoured security boat	Cetus	Offshore patrol	2025	Chartered by the Australian Border Force.
	Flex Fighter Max armoured security boat	Centaur	Offshore patrol	2025	Chartered by the Australian Border Force.
ABFC Cape St. George, Cape St. George	Cape-class patrol boat	Cape St. George	Offshore patrol	2013	
	Cape-class patrol boat	Cape Byron	Offshore patrol	2014	
	Cape-class patrol boat	Cape Nelson	Offshore patrol	2014	
ABFC Cape Sorell, Cape Sorell	Cape-class patrol boat	Cape Sorell	Offshore patrol	2014	
	Cape-class patrol boat	Cape Jervis	Offshore patrol	2015	
ABFC Cape Leveque, Cape Leveque	Cape-class patrol boat	Cape Leveque	Offshore patrol	2015	
	Cape-class patrol boat	Cape Wessel	Offshore patrol	2015	
ABFC Cape York, Cape York	Cape-class patrol boat	Cape York	Offshore patrol	2015	
Then ACV Roebuck Bay (10) alongside ACV Dame Roma Mitchell (70)	Bay-class patrol boat	Roebuck Bay	Offshore patrol	2000	Undergoing life extension work in 2024. Replacement Evolved Cape-class patrol boat ordered.
Then ACV Storm Bay	Bay-class patrol boat	Storm Bay	Offshore patrol	2000	Undergoing life extension work in 2024. Replacement Evolved Cape-class patrol boat ordered.

=== Small boats ===
In 2017, the ABF signed contracts to acquire 13 new harbour and coastal patrol boats. These vessels are stationed around the country and are used for a variety of operations including coastal patrol, surveillance and drug interdiction.

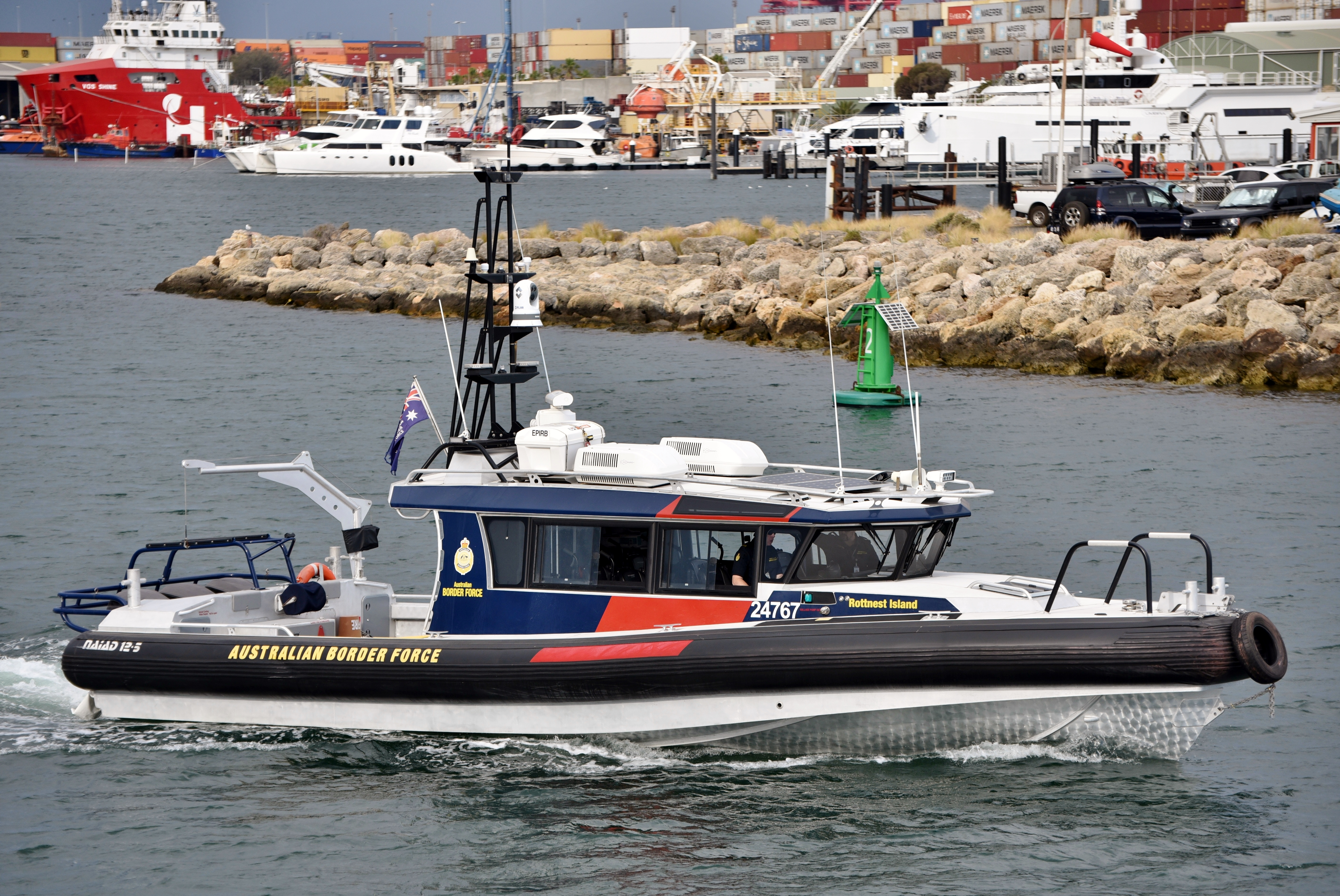
ABF boat Rottnest Island, Fremantle

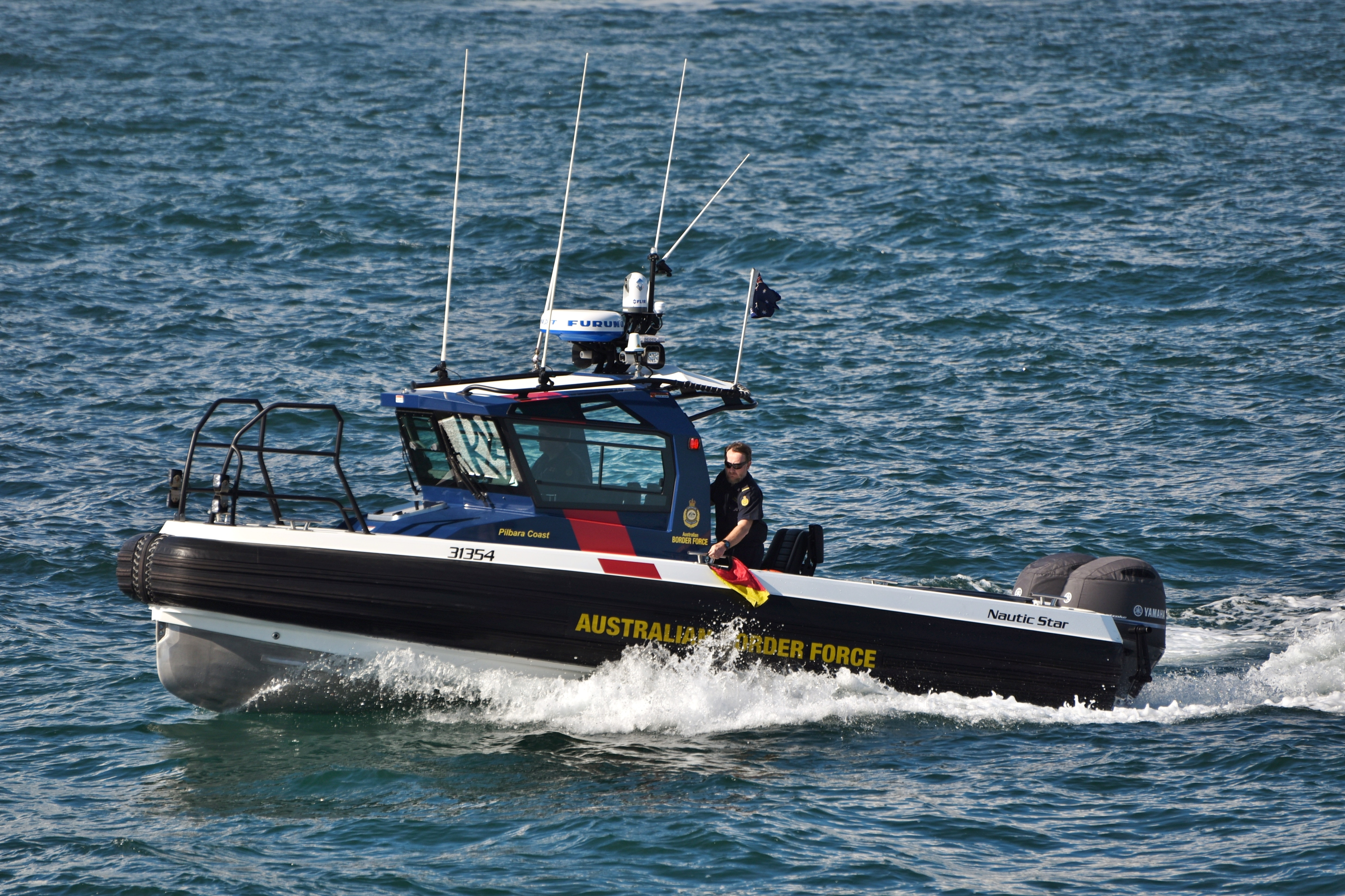
An ABF harbour patrol vessel, Pilbara Coast, Fremantle, 2020

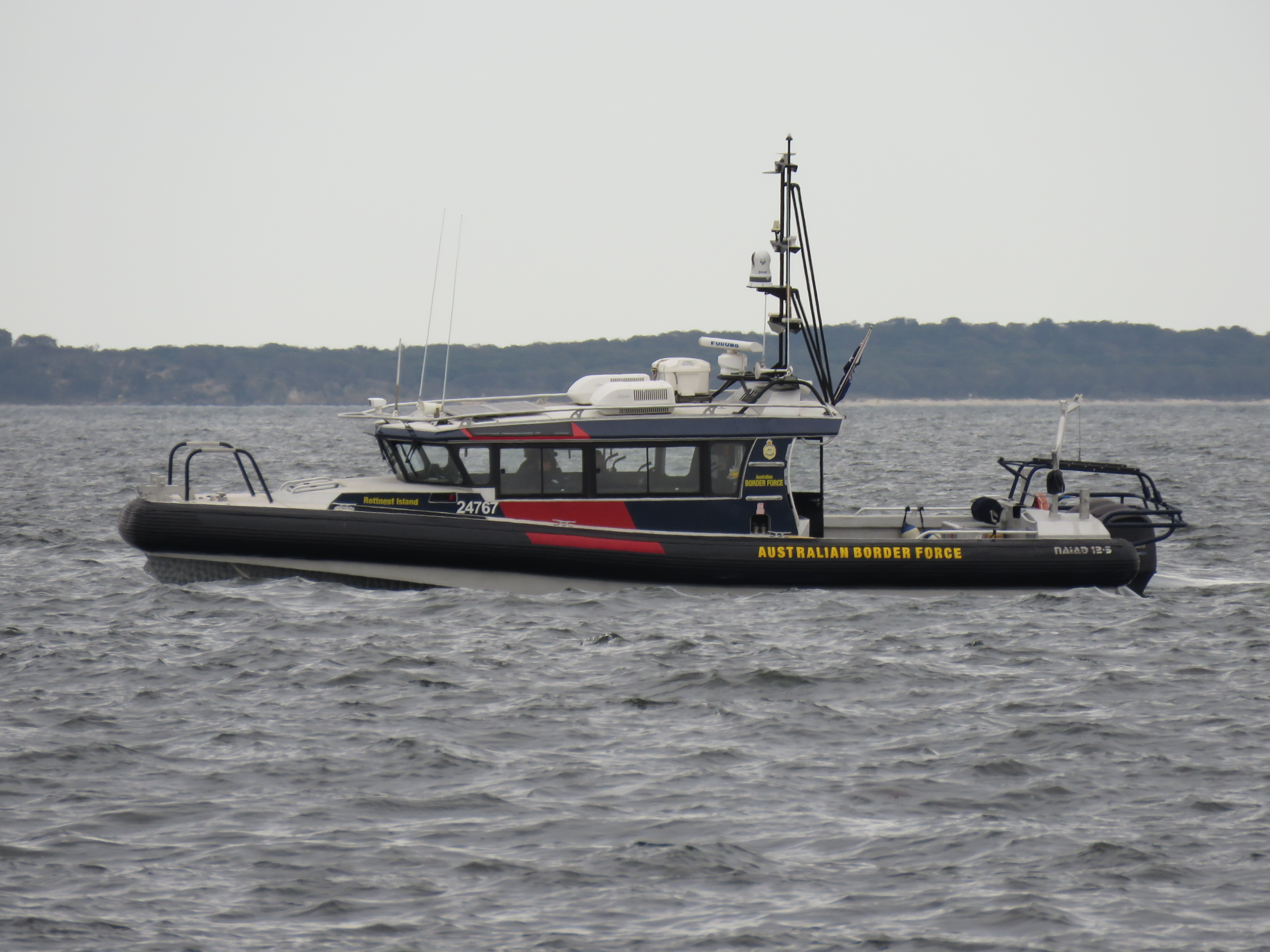
ABF rigid-hulled inflatable boat Rottnest Island near Kwinana Bulk Terminal, August 2021

=== Future ships ===
The Royal Australian Navy (RAN) is acquiring ten Evolved Cape-class patrol boats to act as a stopgap replacement for the Armidale-class patrol boat as they await completion of the Arafura-class offshore patrol vessels. It remains unclear if these Evolved Cape-class patrol vessels will be transferred to the ABF once all Arafura-class vessels have been commissioned into RAN service.

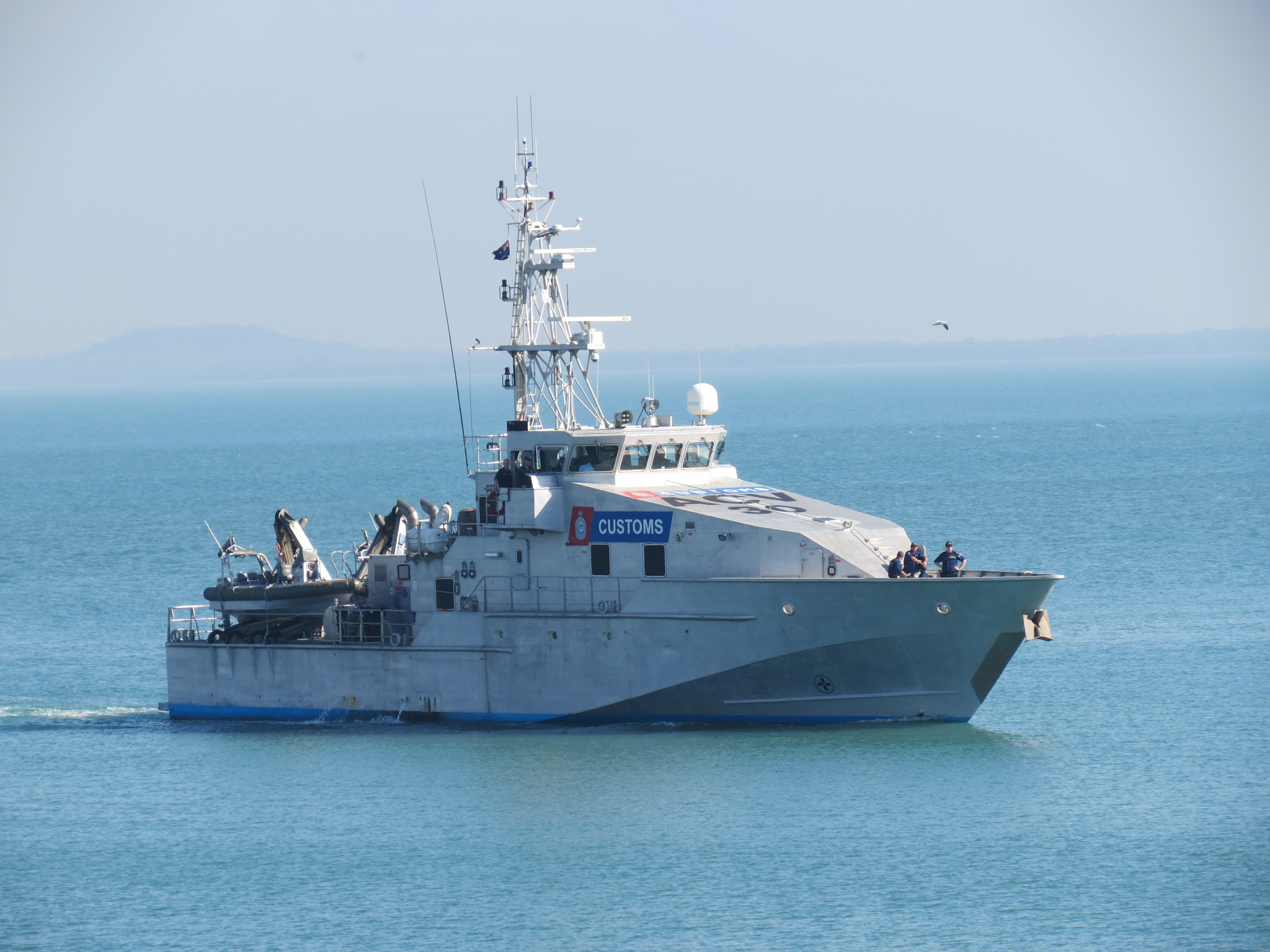
Former Bay class Australian Customs Vessel Botany Bay (ACV30) returns to Stokes Hill Wharf, Darwin, Australia

The 2023 Defence Strategic Review was reportedly considering removing the Arafura-class from RAN service and transferring them to the ABF Marine Unit; this is being considered as the Arafura-class lacks the capabilities required in high-end warfighting. Under that plan, the RAN would instead acquire a fleet of general purpose frigates.

=== Former ships ===
- Six Bay-class patrol boats – two each have been gifted to the Sri Lankan Navy and the Malaysian Maritime Enforcement Agency
- ACV Triton
- ACV Ashmore Guardian
- MV Oceanic Viking
