= Cape Nelson State Park =

- IUCN category III (natural monument or feature)
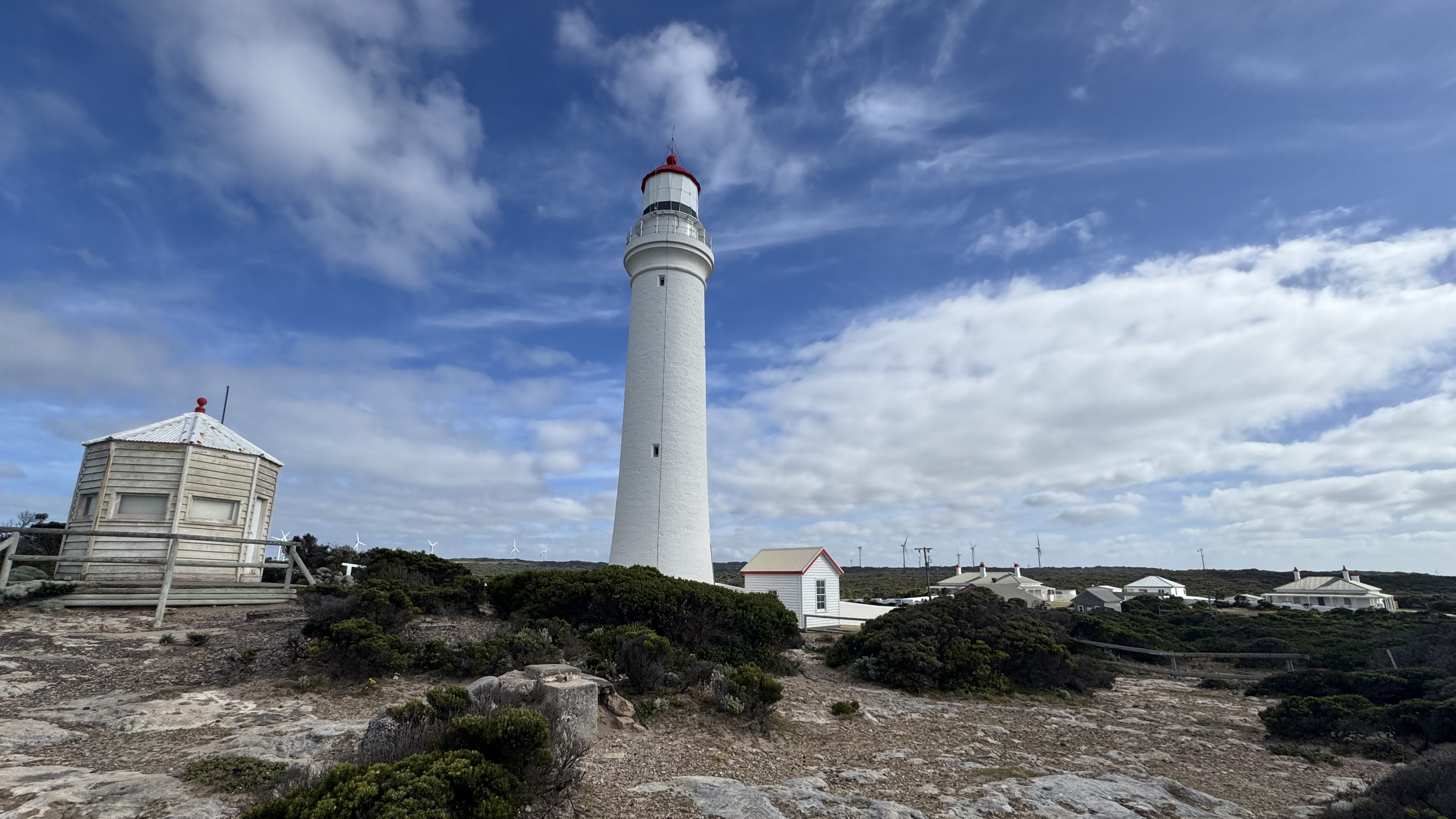
- Cape Nelson Lighthouse and its surroundings

- Location within Victoria
- Location: Victoria
- Nearest city: Portland
- Coordinates: 38°25′18″S 141°32′28″E
- Area: 2.43 km^{2} (0.94 sq mi)
- Governing body: Parks Victoria
- Website: parkweb.vic.gov.au/explore/parks/cape-nelson-state-park

The Cape Nelson State Park, near Portland on Victoria's southwest coast is a 243-hectare (600-acre) state park. Attractions include a 3-kilometre (2 mi) clifftop walk and a visit to the Cape Nelson lighthouse. The lighthouse was completed in 1884 and today offers accommodation in the Light Station Keepers Cottages. Part of the route of the Great South West Walk is located within the park.

Fauna include the Heath Mouse, Red-necked Wallaby and Echidna. The main vegetation types are listed as Soap Mallee, Heath and Wet Heath.

The Cape Nelson lighthouse featured in the 2010 romantic drama South Solitary. The film provides good coverage of the interior of the lighthouse, cottage features and the landscape.

== Climate ==
Cape Nelson has a warm-summer mediterranean climate (Köppen: Csb) with comfortable, dry summers and mild, wet winters.

Climate data for Cape Nelson Lighthouse (38º26'S, 141º32'E, 45 m AMSL) (1995-2024 normals and extremes)
Month	Jan	Feb	Mar	Apr	May	Jun	Jul	Aug	Sep	Oct	Nov	Dec	Year
Record high °C (°F)	42.4 (108.3)	39.8 (103.6)	40.6 (105.1)	35.2 (95.4)	28.3 (82.9)	21.0 (69.8)	20.0 (68.0)	25.2 (77.4)	29.3 (84.7)	35.0 (95.0)	37.1 (98.8)	45.1 (113.2)	45.1 (113.2)
Mean daily maximum °C (°F)	21.4 (70.5)	21.3 (70.3)	20.3 (68.5)	18.4 (65.1)	16.2 (61.2)	14.3 (57.7)	13.8 (56.8)	14.5 (58.1)	16.0 (60.8)	17.3 (63.1)	18.6 (65.5)	19.9 (67.8)	17.7 (63.8)
Mean daily minimum °C (°F)	14.8 (58.6)	15.1 (59.2)	14.1 (57.4)	12.4 (54.3)	10.8 (51.4)	9.1 (48.4)	8.4 (47.1)	8.7 (47.7)	9.5 (49.1)	10.5 (50.9)	12.0 (53.6)	13.1 (55.6)	11.5 (52.8)
Record low °C (°F)	6.6 (43.9)	8.1 (46.6)	7.5 (45.5)	5.8 (42.4)	3.0 (37.4)	2.9 (37.2)	1.4 (34.5)	2.3 (36.1)	3.0 (37.4)	3.5 (38.3)	4.8 (40.6)	5.7 (42.3)	1.4 (34.5)
Average precipitation mm (inches)	31.7 (1.25)	25.3 (1.00)	34.7 (1.37)	46.3 (1.82)	75.2 (2.96)	90.4 (3.56)	100.6 (3.96)	97.5 (3.84)	71.4 (2.81)	51.9 (2.04)	43.5 (1.71)	39.0 (1.54)	703.1 (27.68)
Average precipitation days (≥ 1.0 mm)	4.4	3.6	6.2	8.4	12.6	13.7	15.2	16.8	12.2	9.2	6.7	5.5	114.5
Average afternoon relative humidity (%)	68	70	69	71	73	74	73	71	69	68	70	67	70
Average dew point °C (°F)	12.5 (54.5)	13.3 (55.9)	12.2 (54.0)	11.0 (51.8)	10.0 (50.0)	8.5 (47.3)	7.9 (46.2)	7.8 (46.0)	8.4 (47.1)	8.8 (47.8)	10.6 (51.1)	11.1 (52.0)	10.2 (50.3)
Source: Bureau of Meteorology

== See also ==
- Protected areas of Victoria
- Discovery Bay Coastal Park
