= HMAS Coonawarra =

Royal Australian Navy base in the Northern Territory

- Darwin, Northern Territory in Australia
- Ship's badge of HMAS Coonawarra

Site information
- Type: Naval base
- Owner: Department of Defence
- Operator: Royal Australian Navy (1935 – 1967); Royal Australian Navy (1967 – present)
- Website: navy.gov.au/establishments/hmas-coonawarra

Location
- Location in the Northern Territory
- Coordinates: 12°27′31″S 130°49′18″E

Site history
- Built: 1940
- In use: 1935 – current

Garrison information
- Current commander: Captain Bernadette Alexander, CSC RAN

HMAS Coonawarra is a Royal Australian Navy (RAN) base located in Darwin, Northern Territory, and is home to four fleet units of the RAN. The current Commanding Officer is Captain Bernadette Alexander, CSC, RAN.

== History ==
During World War I, Port Darwin had been used as a coaling station for naval ships, but it was not considered a naval base. Later, during the 1930s, the RAN constructed oil fuel tanks on the harbour front, holding about 82,000 tonnes (90,000 short tons) of oil. All were destroyed in the Japanese attack on Darwin on 19 February 1942.

The first naval depot at Darwin was established in January 1935. This was a naval reserve depot, commanded by Lieutenant Commander H.P. Jarrett. At this time, Darwin was part of the Naval Reserve District of Queensland. In 1937, the Naval District of the Northern Territory was separated from the Queensland District, and the first District Naval Officer, Lieutenant Commander J.H. Walker, was appointed. In 1939, under the recommendation of the Committee of Imperial Defence, a high-powered radio transmitter was constructed. The period leading up to World War II saw a buildup of personnel, the establishment of fuelling facilities, a boom depot and later the Navy paid for improvements to Darwin's water supply in order to provide an adequate supply of water for visiting naval ships.

At the outbreak of World War II, the naval depot in Darwin was named HMAS Penguin, and on 1 August 1940 was formally commissioned as HMAS Melville. Throughout World War II, the Wireless Transmitting Station provided essential communications service in support of Allied Operations in the South West Pacific regions. The base suffered significant damage during the Japanese bombing raids on the city.

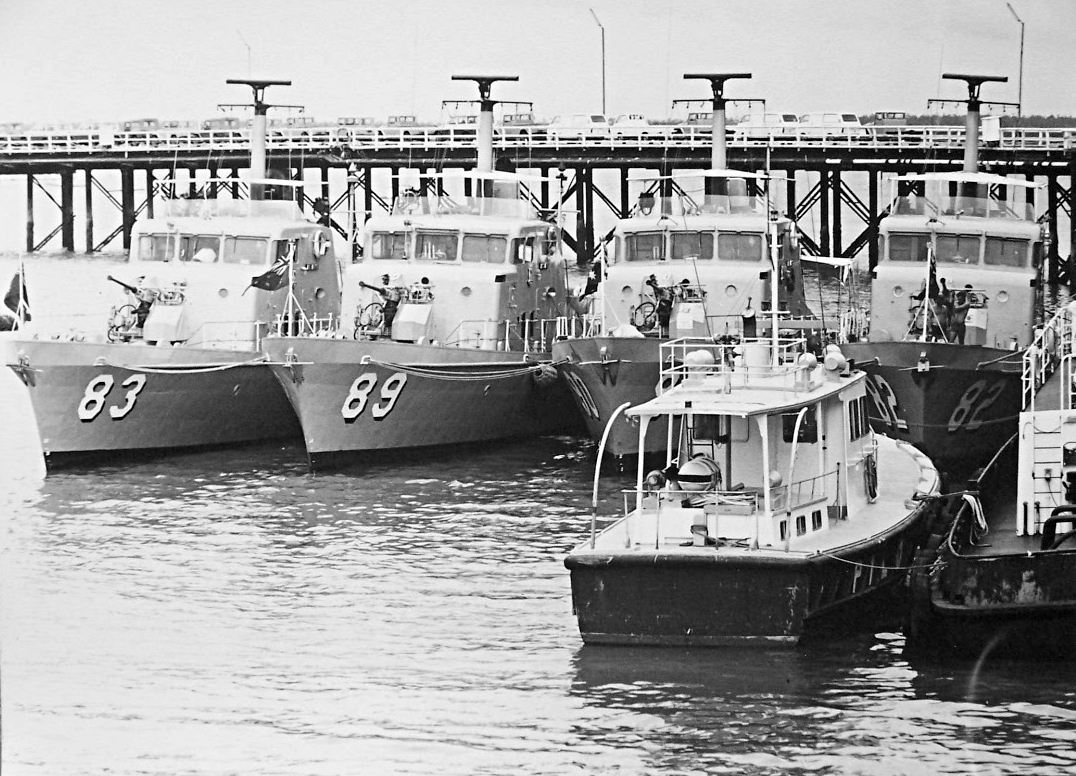
Attack-class patrol boats at Stokes Hill Wharf, Darwin March 1975 (after Cyclone Tracy).

After World War II, the base continued to be known as HMAS Melville. The development of Darwin during the 1950s and 1960s saw the size of Melville shrink, the problem was intensified by the continued growth of naval personnel in Darwin. It was decided to decommission Melville and relocate the RAN's Darwin base to naval Wireless Transmitting Station Coonawarra. Although the base was transferred over and commissioned at HMAS Coonawarra on 16 March 1970, facilities at Melville remained operational until their destruction by Cyclone Tracy on 25 December 1974.

On 30 November 2012, fourteen firearms were stolen from an Armidale-class patrol boat moored at the base. The weapons were recovered the next day.

== Facilities and operational units ==
The wharf can accommodate six vessels, berthed three abreast. Services such as fuel, electrical power, compressed air, sewerage out, oily waste suction, and defuelling is available at the berthing points. The facility has the capability to dock a vessel with a draught of up to two metres (six point six feet) at any tide, is capable of lifting or lowering a vessel up to 750 tonnes (830 short tons) at a rate of 420 millimetres (17 in) per minute, and is designed to withstand cyclones.

In 2016 the Australian Government announced plans to significantly redevelop Coonawarra as one of northern Australia's key strategic naval bases. The plans announced projected that the base will support an increased maritime force, including some of the twelve new offshore patrol vessels that will be based in Darwin. An A$1.2 billion injection was expected to commence in 2025.

=== Ships stationed ===
- Cape class:
  - HMAS Cape Woolamai
  - HMAS Cape Pillar
  - HMAS Cape Solander
  - HMAS Cape Schanck

== See also ==
- List of Royal Australian Navy bases
- Larrakeyah Barracks
