= ADV Cape Peron =

Cape-class patrol boat of the Royal Australian Navy

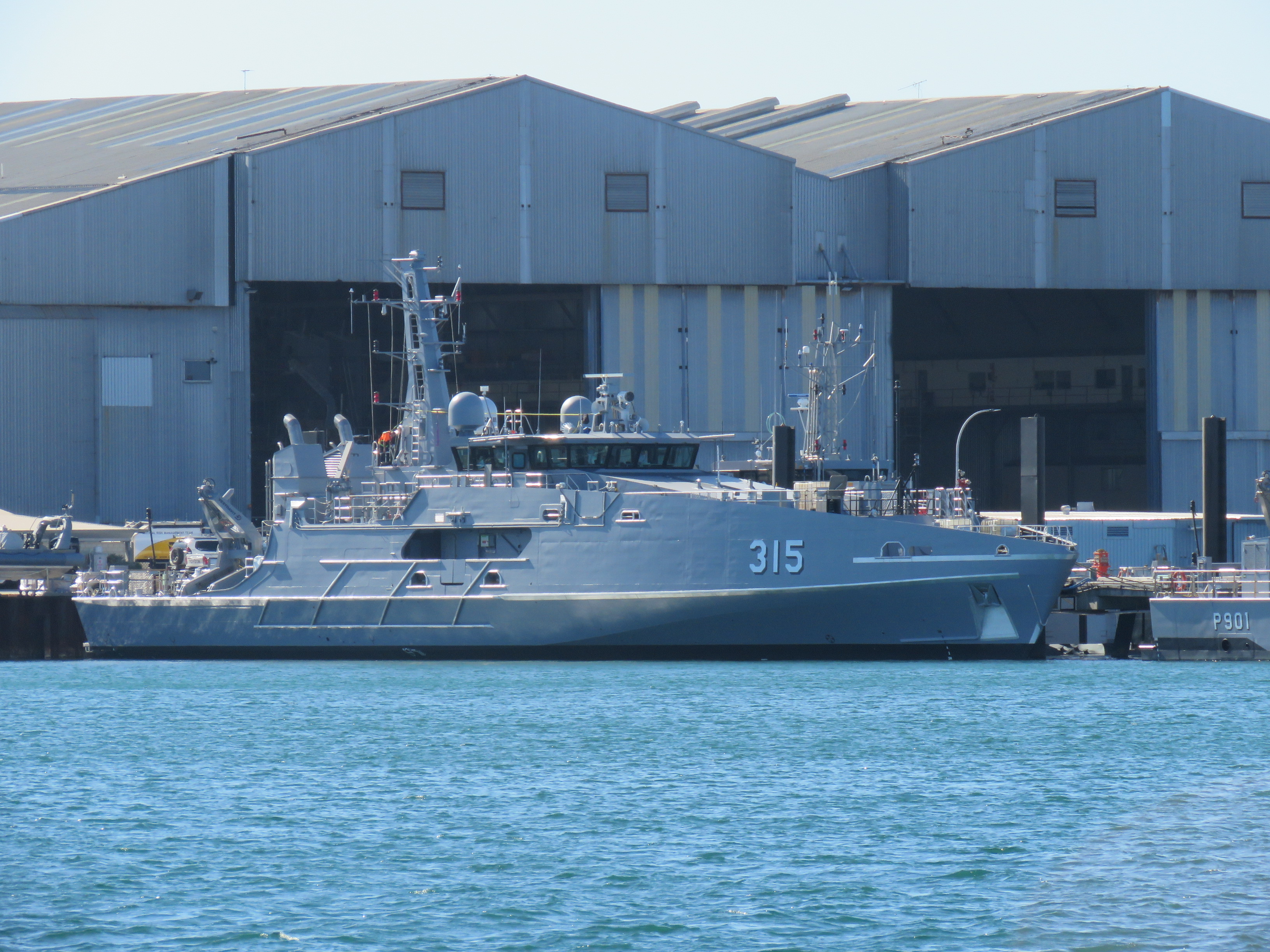
- ADV Cape Peron at Austal shipyards in Henderson, Western Australia in February 2022

History

Australia
- Namesake: Cape Peron
- Builder: Austal, Henderson, Western Australia
- In service: 5 August 2022
- Homeport: HMAS Cairns
- Identification: IMO number: 4764082; MMSI number: 503102000; Callsign: VKBQ; Pennant number: 315

General characteristics
- Class & type: Cape-class patrol boat
- Length: 58.1 m (190 ft 7 in)
- Beam: 10.6 m (34 ft 9 in)
- Draught: 3.1 m (10 ft 2 in)
- Propulsion: 2 x Caterpillar 3516C diesels 6,770 hp (5,050 kW) 2 shafts, 1 bow thruster
- Speed: 26 knots (48 km/h; 30 mph)
- Range: 4,000 nmi (7,400 km; 4,600 mi) at 12 knots (22 km/h; 14 mph)
- Complement: 25 standard, 32 maximum
- Armament: 2 × 12.7 mm (0.5 in) machine guns

Australian Defence Vessel (ADV) Cape Peron, named after Cape Peron in Western Australia, is an evolved Cape-class patrol boat of the Royal Australian Navy (RAN).

The ship is the second of eight evolved Cape-class patrol boats to be delivered to the Royal Australian Navy. Prior to Cape Peron, the RAN already operated the Cape-class patrol boats Cape Fourcroy and Cape Inscription as well as the evolved Cape-class patrol boat Cape Otway.

The ship was built by Austal in Henderson, Western Australia, accepted on 5 August 2022 and based at HMAS Cairns in Queensland, where it arrived in November 2022. The patrol boat's primary duty lies in fisheries protection, immigration, customs and drug law enforcement operations.

The ship is one of the original six evolved Cape-class patrol boats the RAN ordered in April 2020 to replace the Armidale-class patrol boats in this role, at a projected cost of A$324 million. This order was subsequently expanded by another two boats in April 2022, at an additional projected cost of $124 million. In November 2023, the RAN ordered a further two evolved Cape-class patrols, at a cost of A$157.1 million.
