= ADV Cape Otway =

Cape-class patrol boat of the Royal Australian Navy

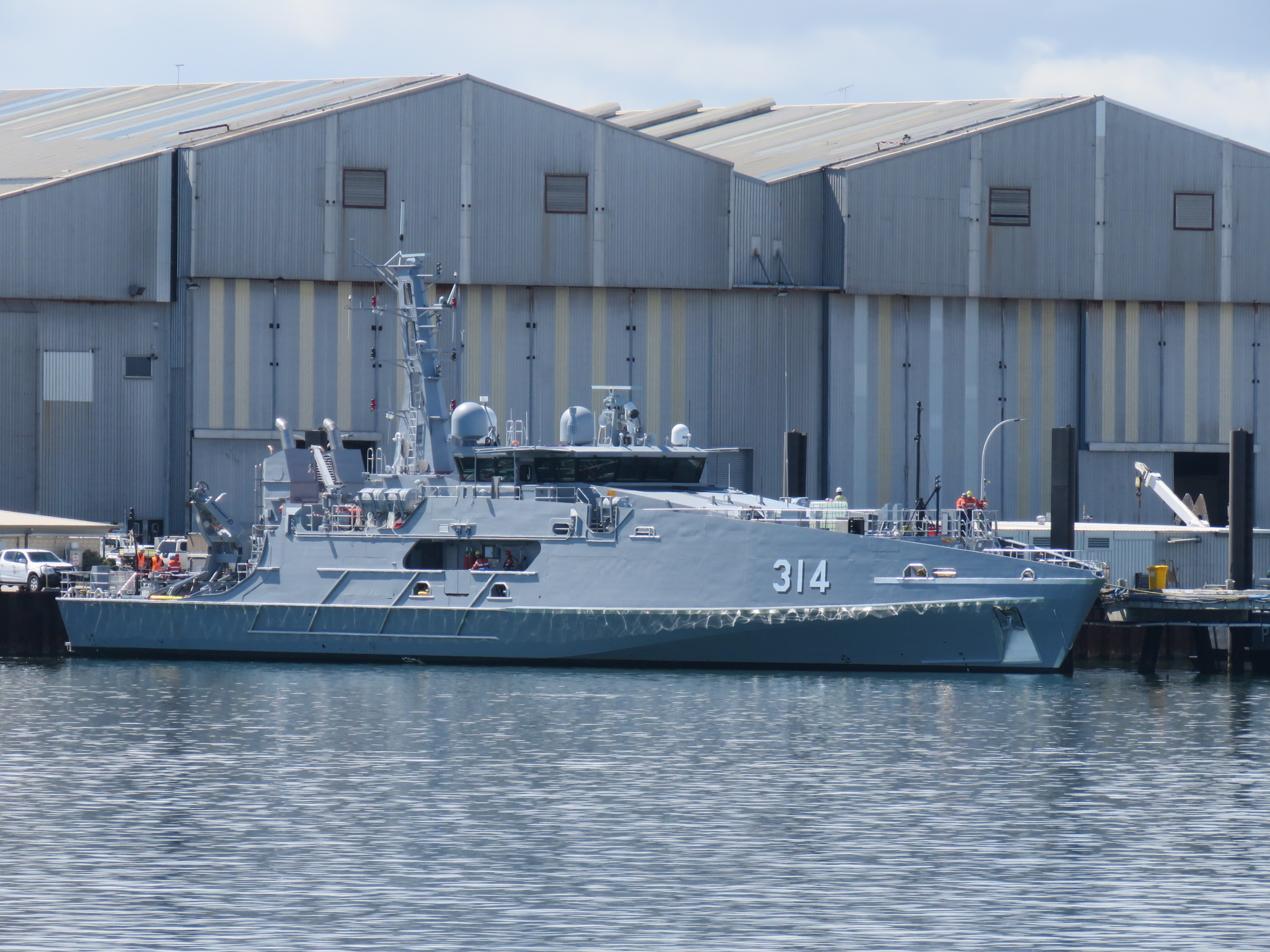
- ADV Cape Otway at Austal's shipyard in Henderson, Western Australia in November 2021

History

Australia
- Namesake: Cape Otway
- Builder: Austal, Henderson, Western Australia
- In service: 23 March 2022
- Home port: HMAS Cairns
- Identification: IMO number: 4764070; MMSI number: 503101000; Callsign: VKBP; Pennant number: 314

General characteristics
- Class & type: Cape-class patrol boat
- Length: 58.1 m (190 ft 7 in)
- Beam: 10.6 m (34 ft 9 in)
- Draught: 3.1 m (10 ft 2 in)
- Propulsion: 2 x Caterpillar 3516C diesels 6,770 hp (5,050 kW) 2 shafts, 1 bow thruster
- Speed: 26 knots (48 km/h; 30 mph)
- Range: 4,000 nmi (7,400 km; 4,600 mi) at 12 knots (22 km/h; 14 mph)
- Complement: 25 standard, 32 maximum
- Armament: 2 × 12.7 mm (0.5 in) machine guns

Australian Defence Vessel (ADV) Cape Otway, named after Cape Otway, is an evolved Cape-class patrol boat of the Royal Australian Navy (RAN).

It is the first of eight evolved Cape-class patrol boats to be delivered to the RAN. Prior to Cape Otway, the RAN already operated the Cape-class patrol boats Cape Fourcroy and Cape Inscription.

It was built by Austal in Henderson, Western Australia, accepted on 23 March 2022 and based at HMAS Cairns in Queensland, where it arrived in June 2022. The patrol boat's primary duty lies in fisheries protection, immigration, customs and drug law enforcement operations.

The ship is one of the original six evolved Cape-class patrol boats the RAN ordered in April 2020 to replace the Armidale-class patrol boats in this role, at a projected cost of A$324 million. This order was subsequently expanded by another two boats in April 2022, at an additional projected cost of $124 million. In November 2023, the RAN ordered a further two evolved Cape-class patrols, at a cost of A$157.1 million.

== Service History ==
Towards the end of 2025, Teekay Shipping Australia was awarded a contract under the Australia Defence Maritime Support Services Program (DMSSP) to provide crewing and support for ADV Cape Otway as one of the Royal Australian Navy's new navigational training vessel intended to replace the current MV Mercator. She was seen sporting the blue hull and white superstructure paint scheme of the National Support Squadron in February 2026.
