= ADV Cape Fourcroy =

Cape-class patrol boat of the Royal Australian Navy

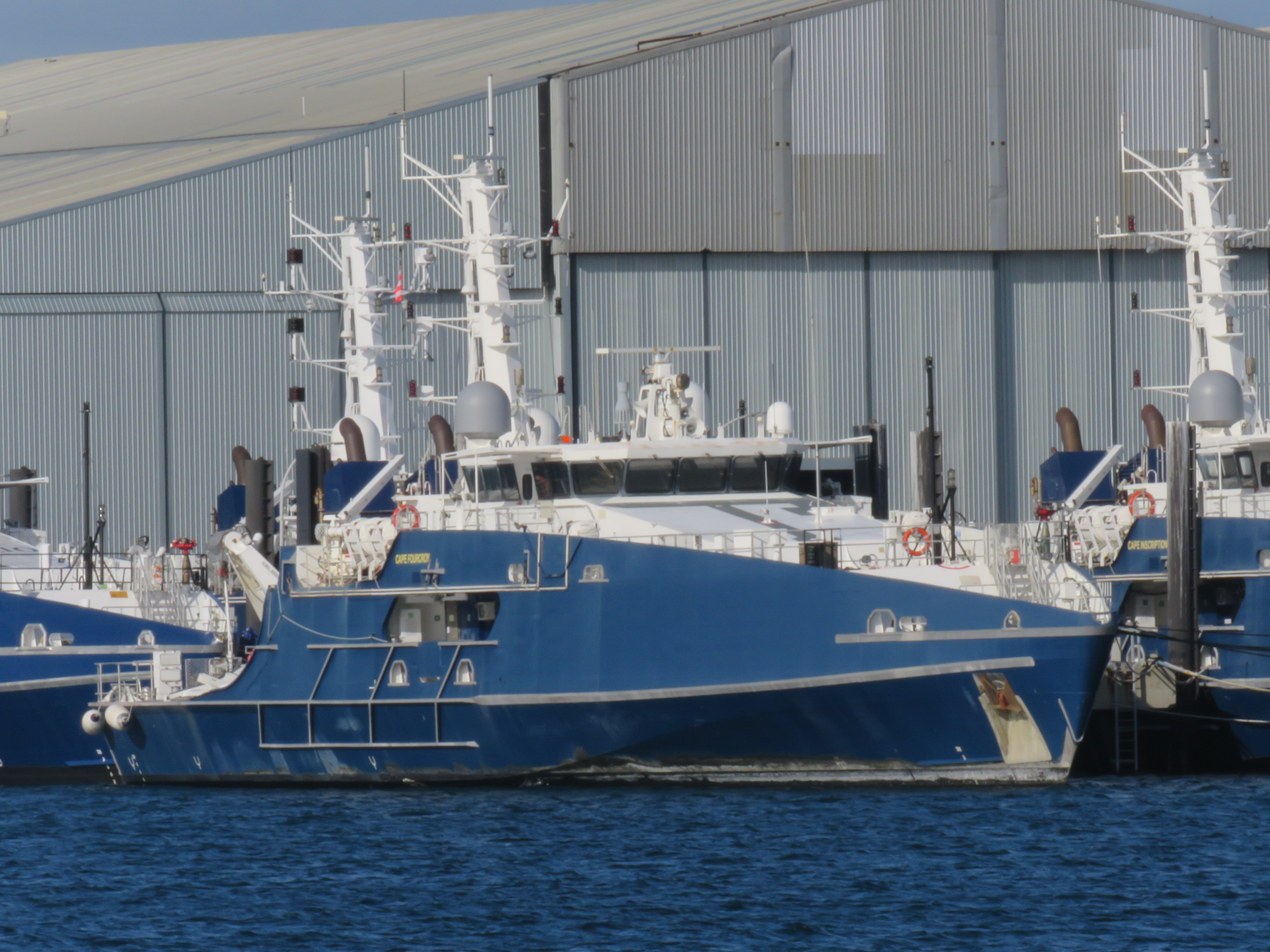
- ADV Cape Fourcroy, at Austal shipyards in Henderson, Western Australia in July 2026

History

Australia
- Namesake: Cape Fourcroy
- Builder: Austal, Henderson, Western Australia
- In service: April 2017
- Home port: HMAS Cairns
- Identification: IMO number: 9806249; MMSI number: 503215000; Callsign: VMCF; Pennant number: 310

General characteristics
- Class & type: Cape-class patrol boat
- Length: 58.1 m (190 ft 7 in)
- Beam: 10.6 m (34 ft 9 in)
- Draught: 3.1 m (10 ft 2 in)
- Propulsion: 2 x Caterpillar 3516C diesels 6,770 horsepower (5,050 kW) 2 shafts, 1 bow thruster
- Speed: 26 knots (48 km/h; 30 mph)
- Range: 4,000 nmi (7,400 km; 4,600 mi) at 12 knots (22 km/h; 14 mph)
- Complement: 21
- Armament: 2 × 12.7 mm (0.5 in) machine guns

Australian Defence Vessel (ADV) Cape Fourcroy, named after Cape Fourcroy in the Northern Territory, is a Cape-class patrol boat of the Royal Australian Navy (RAN).

The ship is the first of two Cape-class patrol boats to be delivered to the Royal Australian Navy, the second having been Cape Inscription. The ship was built by Austal in Henderson, Western Australia, commissioned in April 2017 and based at HMAS Cairns in Queensland.

Austal was originally awarded a $350 million contract to construct eight Cape-class patrol boats for the Australian Border Force to replace the Bay-class patrol boats in 2011, with the eight boats delivered between 2013 and 2015. A $63 million contract for two more boats, for lease by the RAN, was awarded to Austal by the National Australia Bank in December 2015. Subsequently, the RAN ordered another eight Evolved Cape-class patrol boats from Austal. In November 2023, the RAN ordered a further two evolved Cape-class patrols, at a cost of A$157.1 million.

Unlike the later ten boats, which are in a grey colour scheme, Cape Inscription and Cape Fourcroy are in the blue and white colour scheme of the eight Australian Border Force vessels, but without the red stripe.
