= List of active Royal Australian Navy ships =

Naval ensign of Royal Australian Navy

The Royal Australian Navy (RAN) fleet is made up of 32 commissioned warships and 11 non-commissioned as of February 2026, with the non-commissioned vessels using the prefix of ADV (Australian Defence Vessel).

The main strength consists of three destroyers and seven frigates of the surface combatant force: three Hobart class destroyers and seven Anzac class frigates. Six Collins-class boats make up the submarine service. Amphibious warfare assets include two Canberra-class landing helicopter dock ships and the Bay-class landing ship HMAS Choules. One Arafura-class and six Cape-class patrol boats perform coastal and economic exclusion zone patrols, and two Huon-class vessels are used for minehunting and clearance (four have been decommissioned). Replenishment at sea is provided by two Supply-class replenishment oilers, while the final remaining Leeuwin-class hydrographic survey vessel, HMAS Melville, perform survey and charting duties.

In addition to the commissioned warships, the RAN operates the sail training ship Young Endeavour, five non-commissioned Cape-class patrol boats and eight individual ships make up the National Support Squadron where vessels are owned by the RAN but manned by a mix of RAN officers and Teekay Shipping Australia personnel under the Australia Defence Maritime Support Services Program (DMSSP). Other auxiliaries and small craft are not operated by the RAN, but by DMS Maritime, who are contracted to provide support services.

The majority of the RAN fleet is divided between Fleet Base East (HMAS Kuttabul, in Sydney) and Fleet Base West (HMAS Stirling, near Perth). Mine warfare assets are located at HMAS Waterhen (also in Sydney), while HMAS Cairns in Cairns and HMAS Coonawarra in Darwin host the navy's patrol and survey vessels.

For over 30 years, the Osborne Naval Shipyard in South Australia has been the main supplier of 'Tier 1 surface combatant' vessels to the RAN, having constructed the entire Collins-class submarine fleet and Hobart-class destroyer fleet. Osborne will further supply the navy with the currently under-construction Hunter-class frigates, as well as SSN-AUKUS nuclear-powered attack submarines and Hobart-class guided-missile destroyer replacements. The Henderson Shipyard in Western Australia will supply the RAN with smaller 'Tier 2 surface combatant' vessels. These include Australian general purpose frigates, Large Optionally-Crewed Surface Vessels (LOSV), and Evolved Cape-class and Arafura-class patrol boats.

== Submarines ==
=== Collins class ===
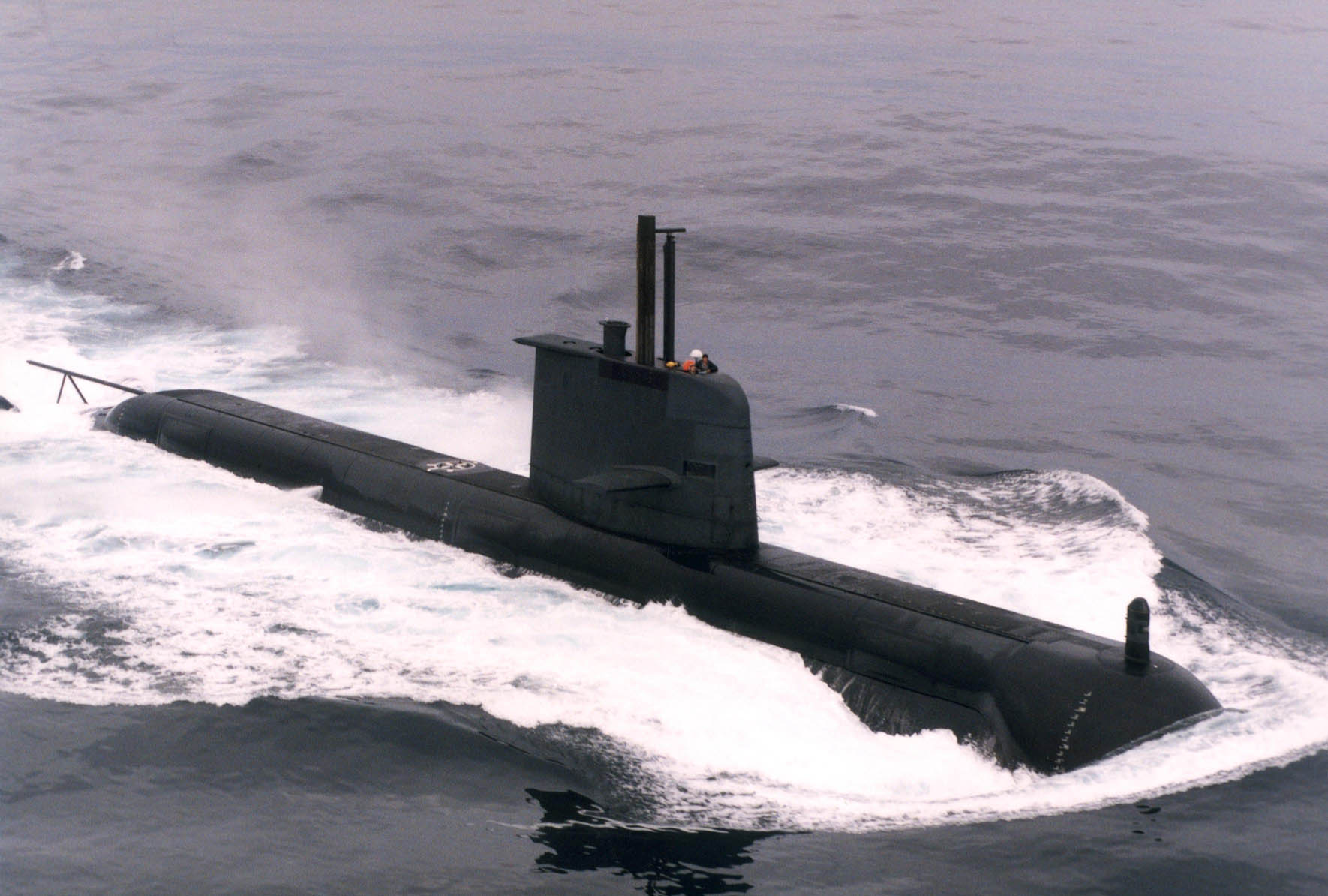
HMAS Collins, lead ship of her class

Australia operates a single class of diesel-electric submarines, the six Collins-class boats which began entering service in 1993. The Collins was designed by the Swedish submarine builder Kockums as the Type 471 specifically to meet Australian requirements, many of which were derived from Australia's need for great range without utilizing a nuclear propulsion system. The boats themselves were built in Australia by the Australian Submarine Corporation in Adelaide. The submarines are classified by the RAN as guided missile submarines (SSG), but are often referred to as hunter-killer submarines (SSK) in the international press. While these vessels represented a major increase in capability for the RAN, they have found themselves mired in numerous technical and operational problems. Meanwhile, the RAN has struggled to sufficiently crew their submarine fleet, with at times no more than two qualified crews available.

The Collins was to be replaced by twelve Shortfin Barracudas a conventionally-powered design of the Barracuda-class nuclear submarine by French shipbuilder Naval Group that had been selected in 2016 and named the Attack-class. In September 2021, in a joint announcement, it was announced that the Attack-class contract had been cancelled, and that Australia would acquire up to eight nuclear-powered submarines with US and UK support through a new trilateral security partnership between Australia, the UK and the US named AUKUS. In March 2023, AUKUS announced that Australia will buy three Virginia class submarines from the US, with the option to buy two more, with the first boat planned to be delivered to Australia in the early 2030s. AUKUS also announced that Australia and the UK will commence construction of a new nuclear-powered submarine class known as the SSN-AUKUS with the first Australian built SSN-AUKUS boat to be delivered by the early 2040s. Australia will reportedly build five SSN-AUKUS boats. The entire Collins-class fleet will now receive a Life-of-Type Extension.

Size	Performance	Armament	Other features
Displacement: 3051 t surfaced 3353 t submerged Length: 77.4 metres (254 ft) Complement: 58	Submerged speed: 21 knots (39 km/h; 24 mph) Surfaced speed: 10.5 knots (19.4 km/h; 12.1 mph) Surfaced range: 11,000 nautical miles (20,000 km; 13,000 mi) Submerged range: 480 nautical miles (890 km; 550 mi)	6 × 21-inch (533 mm) torpedo tubes, firing: Mark 48 Mod 7 CBASS torpedoes, UGM-84C Sub-Harpoon anti-ship missiles, or RWM Italia smart sea mines	Sonars: Scylla, SHORT-TAS Radar: Type 1007 Periscope: CK043, CH093

Name	Pennant number	Commissioned	Homeport	Notes
HMAS Collins	SSG 73	27 July 1996	Fleet Base West	
HMAS Farncomb	SSG 74	31 January 1998	Fleet Base West	
HMAS Waller	SSG 75	10 July 1999	Fleet Base West	
HMAS Dechaineux	SSG 76	23 February 2001	Fleet Base West	
HMAS Sheean	SSG 77	23 February 2001	Fleet Base West	
HMAS Rankin	SSG 78	29 March 2003	Fleet Base West	

== Amphibious warfare ==
=== Canberra class ===
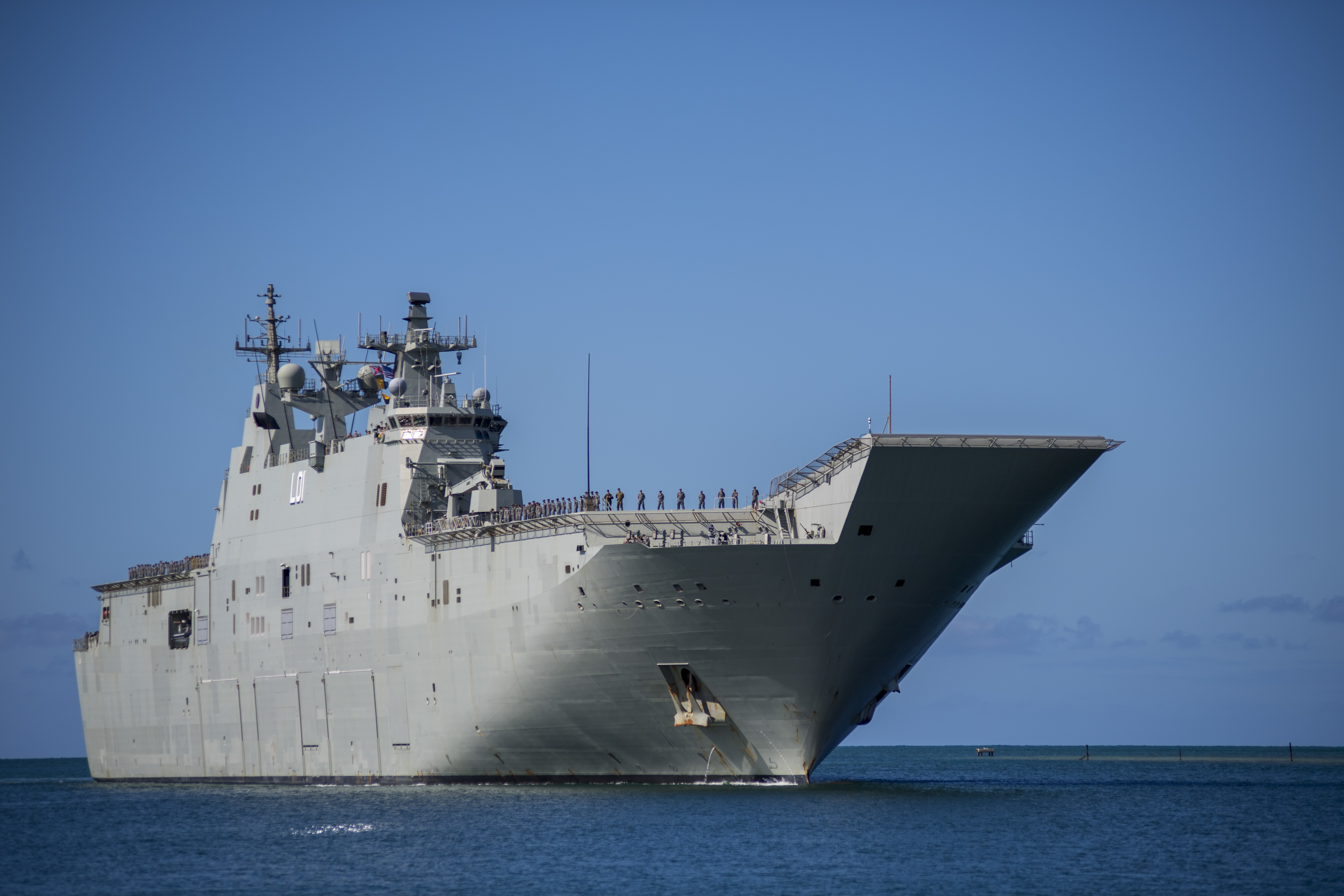
HMAS Adelaide

The Canberra class are landing helicopter dock ships based on the design of Spanish ship Juan Carlos I. The hull of each ship was built by the designer, Navantia, then was transported to Australia by heavy lift ship for internal fitout and installation of the superstructure by BAE Systems Australia. Designed to transport and land an amphibious force of up to 1,600 soldiers by landing craft and helicopter, the Canberras are the largest ships ever operated by the RAN. Lead ship HMAS Canberra was commissioned into the RAN in late 2014. The second ship of the class, Adelaide, was commissioned at the end of 2015.

Size	Performance	Armament	Other features
Displacement: 27,500 t full load Length: 230.82 metres (757.3 ft) Complement: 358 personnel (293 RAN, 62 Army, 3 RAAF); 1,046–1,600 troops	Maximum speed: Over 20 knots (37 km/h; 23 mph) Range: 9,000 nautical miles (17,000 km; 10,000 mi)	4 × Rafael Typhoon 25 mm 6 × 12.7 mm machine guns	Aviation: 6-spot helicopter deck 8 × helicopters (standard load) Boats carried: 4 × LLC in well deck Vehicle deck: Up to 110 vehicles

Name	Pennant number	Commissioned	Homeport	Notes
HMAS Canberra	L02	28 November 2014	Fleet Base East	RAN Flagship
HMAS Adelaide	L01	4 December 2015	Fleet Base East	

=== Choules ===
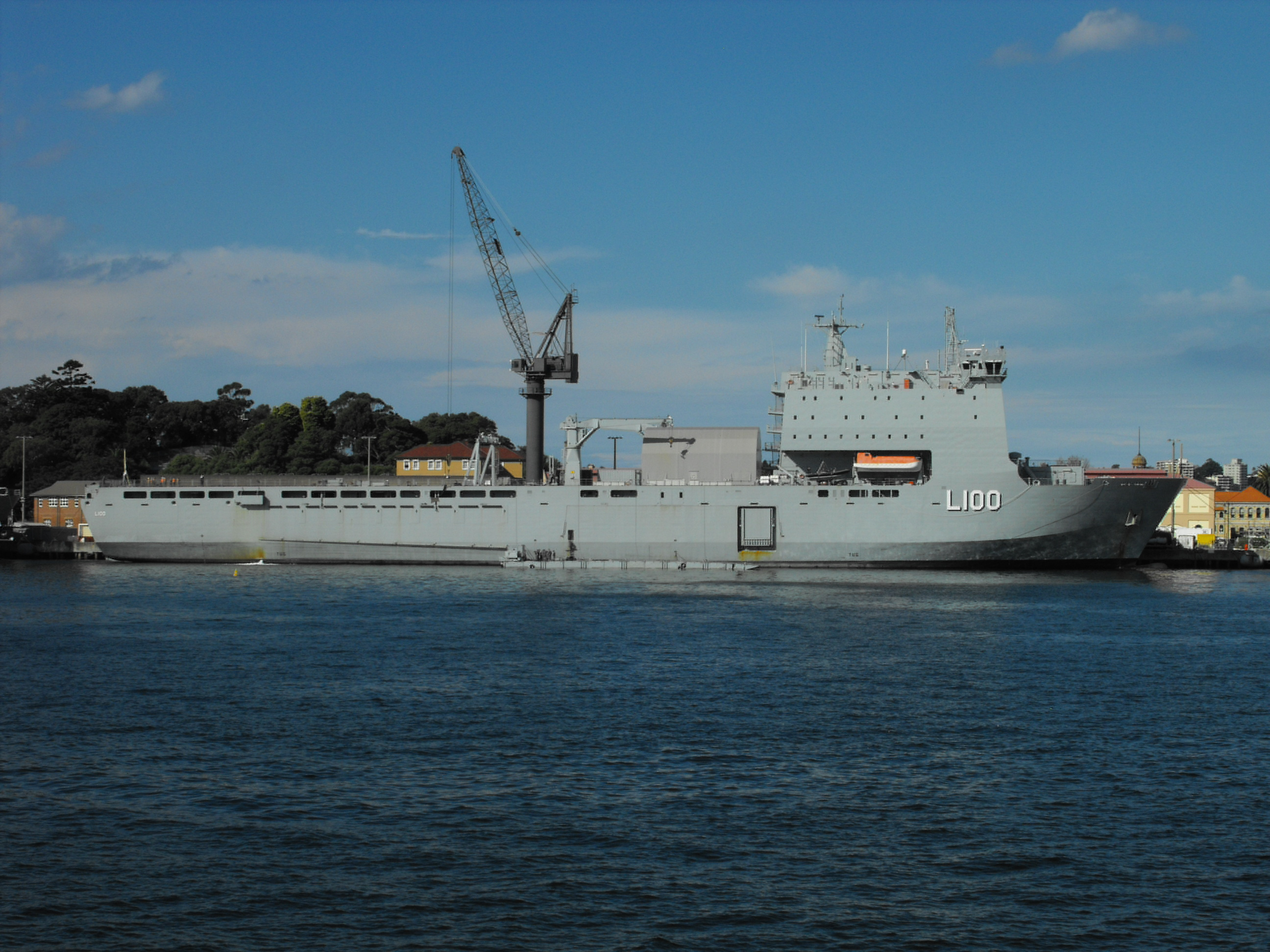
HMAS Choules in 2012

The Bay-class landing ship dock HMAS Choules was acquired by the RAN in 2011. The ship was originally built by Swan Hunter for the British Royal Fleet Auxiliary, and entered British service in 2006 as RFA Largs Bay. She was made redundant in the 2011 Strategic Defence and Security Review and sold to Australia. Choules represents a major increase in sealift capability for the RAN, particularly after mechanical issues in 2010 and 2011 forced the early retirement of the navy's two Kanimbla-class vessels, and put HMAS Tobruk in dock for an extensive refit.

Size	Performance	Armament	Other features
Displacement: 16,190 t full load Length: 176.6 metres (579 ft) Complement: 158 personnel 356–700 troops	Maximum speed: 18 knots (33 km/h; 21 mph) Range: 8,000 nautical miles (15,000 km; 9,200 mi)	1 × Phalanx CIWS	Aviation: Helicopter deck, no permanent hangar; temporary hangar can be fitted Boats carried: 1 × LCU, 1 × LCM-8, or 2 × LCVP in well deck 2 × Mexeflotes on flanks Vehicle deck: 32 tanks or 150 trucks

Name	Pennant number	Commissioned	Homeport	Notes
HMAS Choules	L100	13 December 2011	Fleet Base East	In Royal Fleet Auxiliary service 2006–2011

== Surface combatants ==
=== Hobart class ===
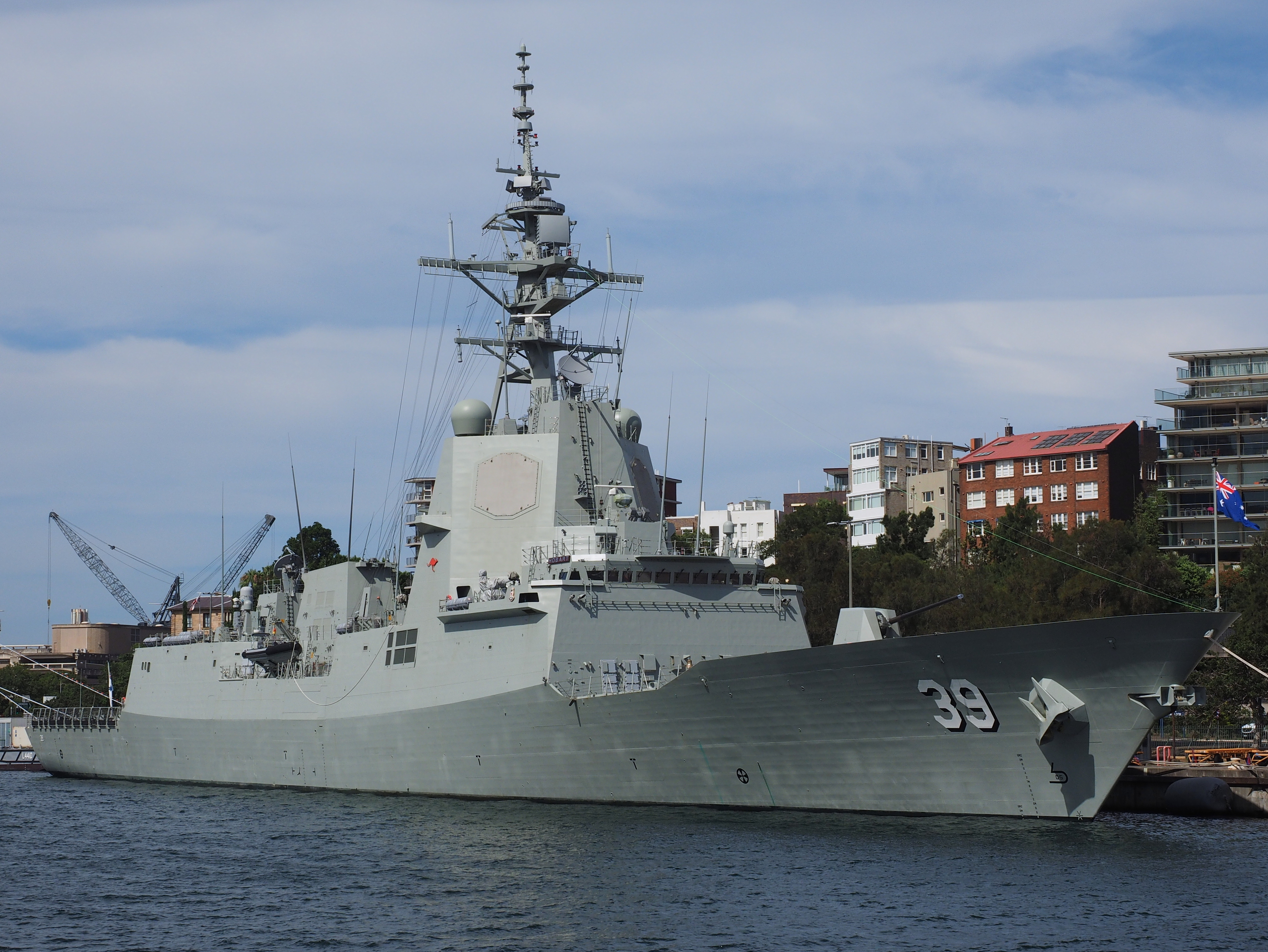
HMAS Hobart in December 2017

Australia operates a single class of air warfare destroyers (AWD). The Hobart-class AWD are based on the Spanish Navantia F100 frigate and incorporate an Aegis Combat System with an AN/SPY-1D(V)phased array radar. These combined with the SM-2 missile provide an advanced air defence system capable of engaging enemy aircraft and missiles at ranges in excess of 150 km (93 mi).

Size	Performance	Armament	Other features
Displacement: 7,000 t full load Length: 147.2 metres (483 ft) Complement: 186 + 16 aircrew	Maximum speed: 28 knots (52 km/h; 32 mph) Range: 5,000 nautical miles (9,300 km; 5,800 mi)	48-cell Mark 41 Vertical Launch System 2 × 4-canister Harpoon missile launchers 1 × Mark 45 Mod 4 5-inch gun 2 × Mark 32 Mod 9 two-tube torpedo launchers 1 × Phalanx CIWS 2 × 25mm M242 Bushmaster autocannons in Typhoon mounts	Aviation: 1 × MH-60R Seahawk Radar: Lockheed Martin AN/SPY-1D(V) S-band radar Sonar: Ultra Electronics Sonar Systems' Integrated Sonar System

Name	Pennant number	Commissioned	Homeport	Notes
HMAS Hobart	DDG 39	23 September 2017	Fleet Base East	
HMAS Brisbane	DDG 41	27 October 2018	Fleet Base East	
HMAS Sydney	DDG 42	19 May 2020	Fleet Base East	

=== Anzac class ===
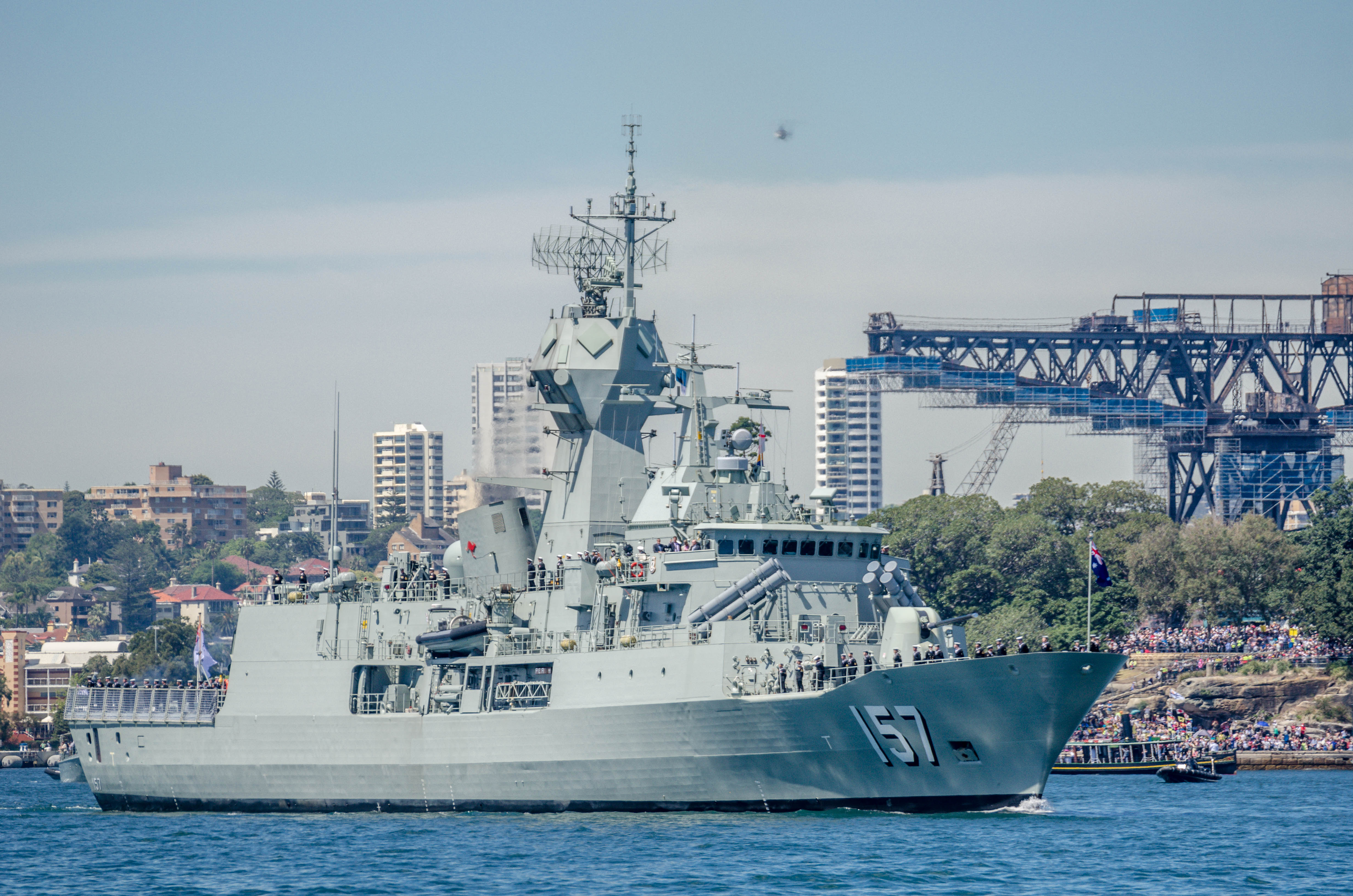
Anzac-class frigate HMAS Perth (post-ASMD configuration)

There are seven Frigates of the Anzac class (the lead ship of the class has been retired). These were commissioned from 1996 to 2006 as part of a joint program with New Zealand, whose navy operates an additional two examples. Derived from Blohm + Voss' MEKO modular ship family and designated the MEKO 200 ANZ by that company, the ships were built in Australia by Tenix in Williamstown, Victoria. They are designated as helicopter frigates (FFH) by the RAN, and are designed to be capable of both mid-level patrol and blue water operations. In 2010, these vessels began to receive upgrades to their anti-ship missile defence (ASMD) capabilities.

Size	Performance	Armament	Other features
Displacement: 3600 t full load Length: 118 metres (387 ft) Complement: 22 officers + 141 sailors	Maximum speed: 27 knots (50 km/h; 31 mph) Range: 6,000 nautical miles (11,000 km; 6,900 mi)	5-inch/54 Mk 45 DP gun 8-cell Mk 41 VLS 8 × Harpoon Block II 2 × Mk 32 triple torpedo tubes	Aviation: 1 × MH-60R Seahawk Radar: CEAFAR radar system incorporating CEAFAR-S S-band multi-function radar, CEAFAR-L L-band long range search radar and CEAMOUNT X-band target illuminator (part of AMCAP upgrade being rolled out across the class) Sonar: Spherion B

Name	Pennant number	Commissioned	Homeport	Notes
HMAS Arunta	FFH 151	12 December 1998	Fleet Base East	
HMAS Warramunga	FFH 152	31 March 2001	Fleet Base East	
HMAS Stuart	FFH 153	17 August 2002	Fleet Base West	
HMAS Parramatta	FFH 154	4 October 2003	Fleet Base West	
HMAS Ballarat	FFH 155	26 June 2004	Fleet Base West	
HMAS Toowoomba	FFH 156	8 October 2005	Fleet Base West	
HMAS Perth	FFH 157	26 August 2006	Fleet Base West	
HMAS Anzac decommissioned May 2024. Two additional ships built for and operated by the Royal New Zealand Navy.

== Patrol and defence ==
=== Arafura class ===
The Arafura-class is a new fleet of offshore patrol vessels being built for the Royal Australian Navy. Originally, the plan was to replace 26 older ships from four different classes with 20 versatile vessels under the SEA 1180 project, each designed to take on a range of tasks like border patrol, mine clearance, and hydrographic surveys using modular mission systems. However, in 2013, the government decided to fast-track the replacement of the aging Armidale-class patrol boats using an existing ship design, while extending the service life of the other vessels. This led to the current Offshore Patrol Vessel (OPV) program, which initially aimed 12 ships and a later proposal of expanded to it 14 with the addition of 2 mine countermeasure variants under a separate project, SEA 1905. This number was then reduced to just 6 of the original design as part of the 2024 Defence Strategic Review.

Size	Performance	Armament	Other features
Displacement: 1,640 t Length: 80 metres (260 ft) Complement: 40	Maximum speed: 22 knots (41 km/h; 25 mph) Range: 4,000 nautical miles (7,400 km; 4,600 mi)	1 × 25 mm M242 Bushmaster 2 × 12.7 mm machine guns	2 × Boomeranger FRB 850 8.5 m (28 ft) RHIBs 1 x Boomeranger C1100 10.5 m (34 ft)

Name	Pennant number	Commissioned	Homeport	Notes
HMAS Arafura	OPV 203	28 June 2025	Fleet Base West	
HMAS Eyre	OPV 204	30 May 2026	Fleet Base West	

=== Cape class ===
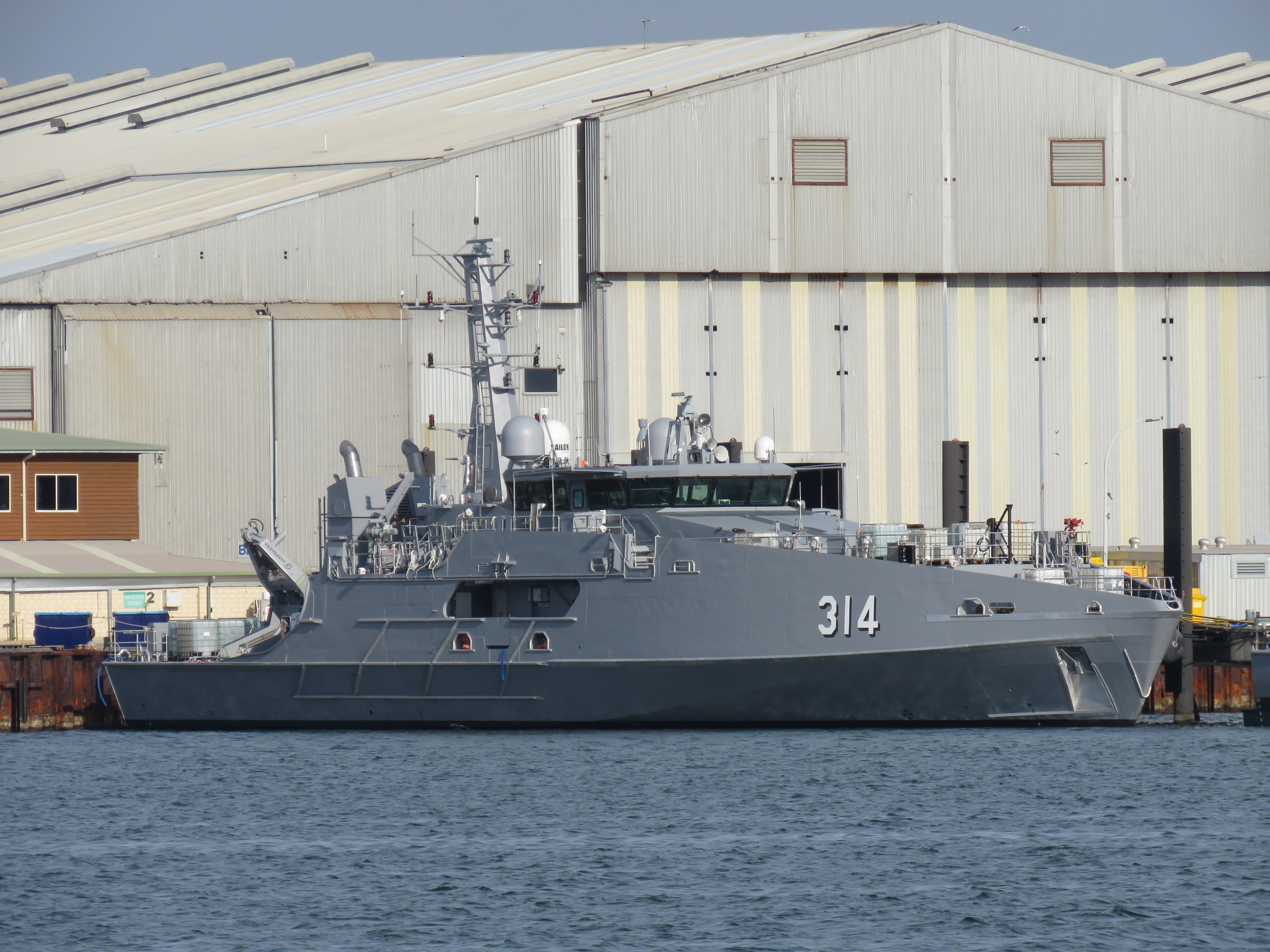
ADV Cape Otway at Austal shipyards in Henderson, Western Australia, October 2021

Eight Cape-class patrol boats were built for the Australian Customs and Border Protection Service (now the Australian Border Force) by Austal between 2012 and 2015, as replacements for the Bay class. Following the loss of HMAS Bundaberg and hull issues with the Armidale-class requiring an intense remedial maintenance program, two Cape-class patrol boats were leased to the RAN from late 2015 until the end of 2016. The patrol boats operate from HMAS Cairns and HMAS Coonawarra in Darwin. These vessels are identified with the Australian Defence Vessel (ADV) prefix; ADV Cape Fourcroy and ADV Cape Inscription retain the blue-and-red customs colour scheme whilst the Evolved Cape-class ships have a grey naval colour scheme. Two new boats were ordered in 2017, and the two leased vessels were returned to the ABF. These two were removed from service in 2026. 10 more were ordered between 2018 to 2023 to replace the ageing Armidale-class.

Size	Performance	Armament	Other features
Length: 57.8 metres (190 ft) Complement: 18	Maximum speed: 25 knots (46 km/h; 29 mph) Range: 4,000 nautical miles (7,400 km; 4,600 mi) at 12 knots (22 km/h; 14 mph)	2 × .50 calibre machine guns	2 × 7.3 m (24 ft) Gemini RHIBs

Name	Pennant Number	In service	Homeport	Notes
Evolved Cape-class
ADV Cape Otway	P314	23 March 2022	HMAS Waterhen	Rerolled as a navigation training vessel
ADV Cape Peron	P315	5 August 2022	HMAS Cairns	
HMAS Cape Naturaliste	P316	4 November 2022	HMAS Coonawarra	
HMAS Cape Capricorn	P317	13 February 2023	HMAS Coonawarra	
HMAS Cape Woolamai	P318	22 June 2023	HMAS Coonawarra	
HMAS Cape Pillar	P319	13 October 2023	HMAS Coonawarra	
HMAS Cape Solander	P312	1 August 2024	HMAS Coonawarra	
HMAS Cape Schanck	P313	1 November 2024	HMAS Coonawarra	
HMAS Cape Spencer	P225	10 September 2025	HMAS Cairns	
HMAS Cape Hawke	P226	27 February 2026	HMAS Cairns	
Eight additional boats built for and operated by the Australian Border Force, with another two under construction.

=== Huon class ===
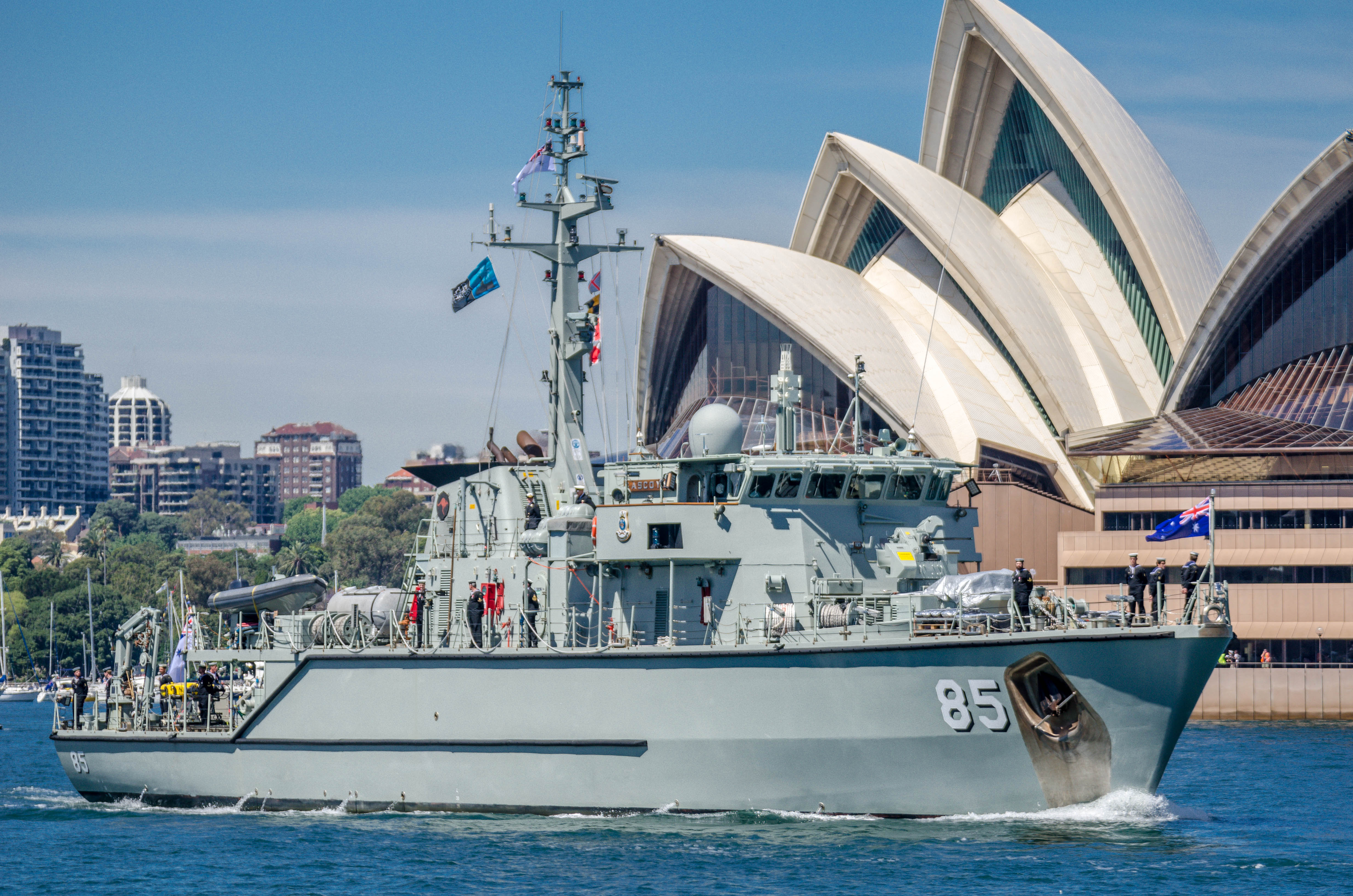
Huon-class minehunter HMAS Gascoyne

Mine countermeasures at sea are handled by the Huon-class minehunters, which began to enter RAN service from 1999. The class was based on the Italian Navy's Gaeta-class minehunter developed by Intermarine. Development was undertaken in partnership between Intermarine and Australian Defence Industries (ADI). The first hull was built in Italy, with fitting out the first and construction of the remaining five vessels of the class done by ADI in Newcastle, replacing the problematic Bay-class minehunters. In addition to the mine warfare role, they have been deployed on multiple occasions to support Northern Australian patrol and border protection operations. Two vessels operate out of HMAS Waterhen, in Sydney. The others has been decommissioned and either sold (Norman and Hawkesbury) or awaiting further options (Huon and Gascoyne).

Size	Performance	Armament	Other features
Displacement: 720 t full load Length: 52.5 metres (172 ft) Complement: 6 officers + 33 sailors	Maximum speed: 14 knots (26 km/h; 16 mph) Range: 1,500 nautical miles (2,800 km; 1,700 mi)	1 × 30 mm DS30B autocannon 2 × 12.7 mm machine guns	2 × Double Eagle mine disposal vehicles Type 1007 navigational radar Type 2093M minehunting sonar Type 133 PRISM radar warning 2 × Wallop Super Barricade decoy launchers

Name	Pennant number	Commissioned	Homeport	Notes
HMAS Diamantina	M 86	4 May 2002	HMAS Waterhen	
HMAS Yarra	M 87	1 March 2003	HMAS Waterhen	
HMAS Hawkesbury and HMAS Norman were both placed into reserve in 2011 and decommissioned in 2018. HMAS Huon and HMAS Gascoyne were decommissioned in 2024.

== Replenishment ==
=== Supply class ===
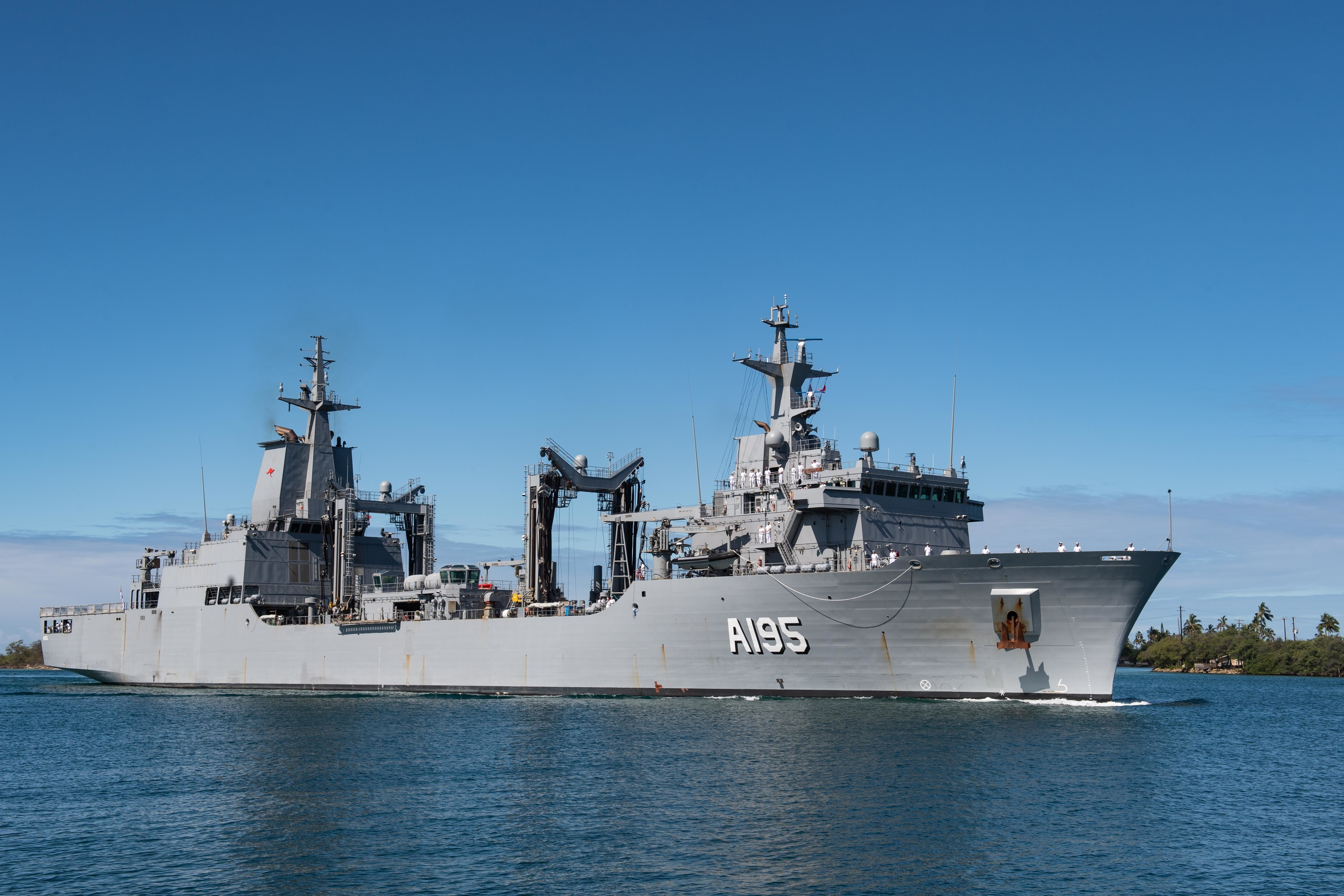
The Supply-class replenishment oiler HMAS Supply in 2022

Two Supply-class replenishment ships were ordered in 2016, the ships are based on Spanish Navantia's design AOR Cantabria, these ships replaced the RAN's ageing replenishment vessels HMAS Success and HMAS Sirius. The ships are designed to provide fuel, food, ammunition, and other stores to RAN vessels operating well beyond friendly ports. The two vessels were built at Navantia's shipyard in Ferrol.

Size	Performance	Armament	Other features
Displacement: 19,500 t full load Length: 173.9 metres (571 ft) Complement: 122	Maximum speed: 20 knots (37 km/h; 23 mph) Range: 6,000 nautical miles (11,000 km; 6,900 mi)	1 × Phalanx CIWS 2 × 25mm M242 Bushmaster autocannons in Typhoon mounts	1,450 cubic metres of JP5 jet fuel 8,200 cubic metres of marine diesel fuel 1,400 cubic metres of fresh water 270 tonnes of ammunition 470 tonnes of provisions Aviation: 1 MRH-90 helicopter

Name	Pennant number	Commissioned	Homeport	Notes
HMAS Supply	A195	10 April 2021	Fleet Base East	
HMAS Stalwart	A304	13 November 2021	Fleet Base West	

== Hydrographic survey ==
=== Leeuwin class ===
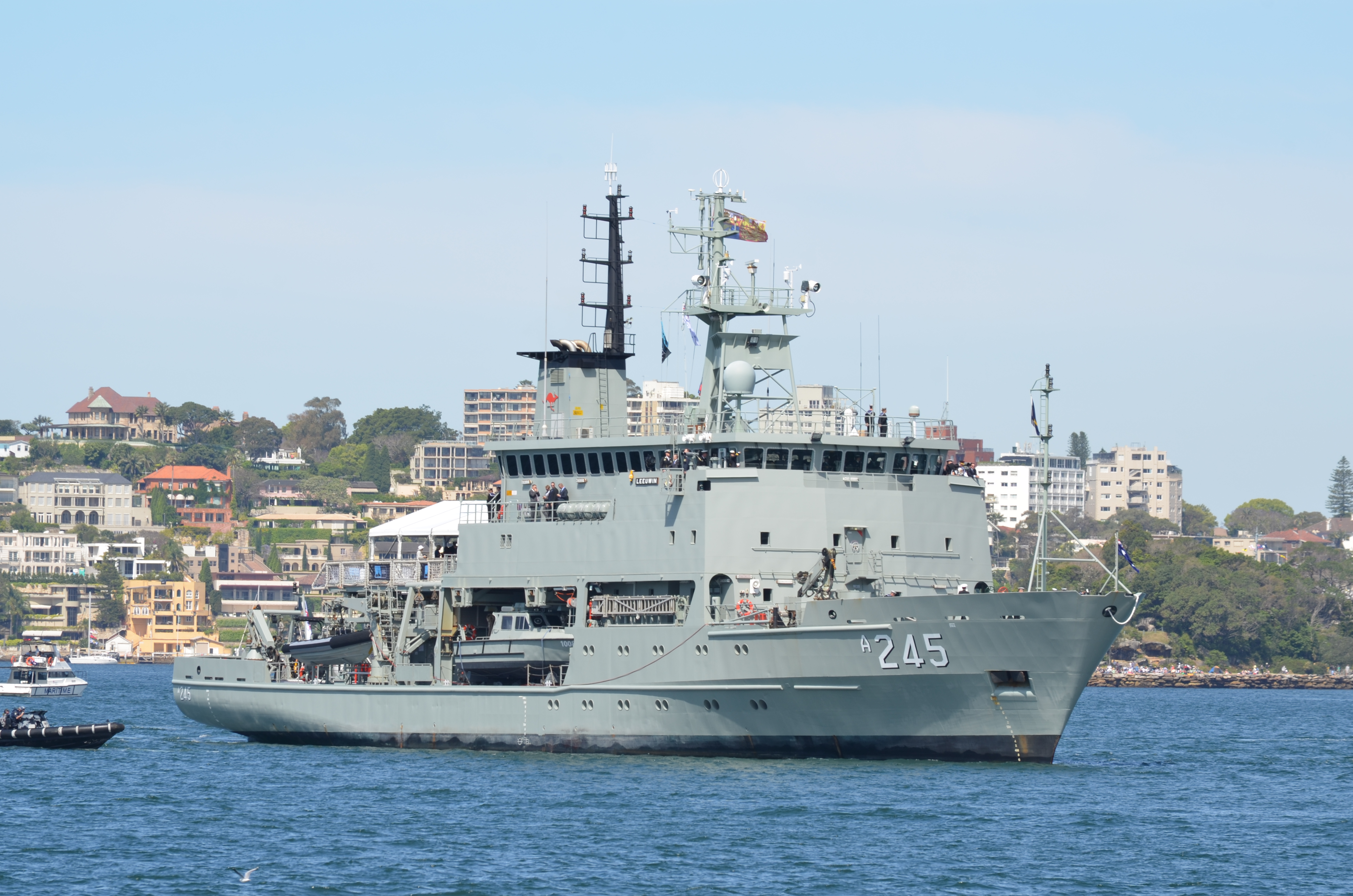
Leeuwin-class survey vessel HMAS Leeuwin

Only one of the two Leeuwin-class survey ships is still active as of 3 November 2024. They were built for the RAN by NQEA of Cairns. Ordered in 1996, the ships were commissioned in a joint ceremony in 2000. They are capable of charting waters up to 6,000 metres (20,000 ft) deep, and carry three Fantome-class survey boats for shallow-water work. In addition to hydrographic surveying duties, since 2001 both vessels have also operated in support of the RAN patrol force.

Size	Performance	Armament	Other features
Displacement: 2,170 t Length: 71.2 metres (234 ft) Complement: 10 officers + 46 sailors	Maximum speed: 18 knots (33 km/h; 21 mph) Range: 18,000 nautical miles (33,000 km; 21,000 mi) at 9 knots (17 km/h; 10 mph)	2 × × 12.7 mm machine guns	Sonars: C-Tech CMAS 36/39 hull mounted high frequency active sonar Atlas Fansweep-20 multibeam echo sounder Atlas Hydrographic Deso single-beam echo sounder Klein 2000 towed sidescan sonar array Radar; STN Atlas 9600 ARPA navigation radar Aviation: Helicopter deck, no hangar

Name	Pennant number	Commissioned	Homeport	Notes
HMAS Leeuwin	A 245	27 May 2000	HMAS Cairns	
HMAS Melville decommissioned August 2024.				

== Non-commissioned vessels ==
=== Young Endeavour ===
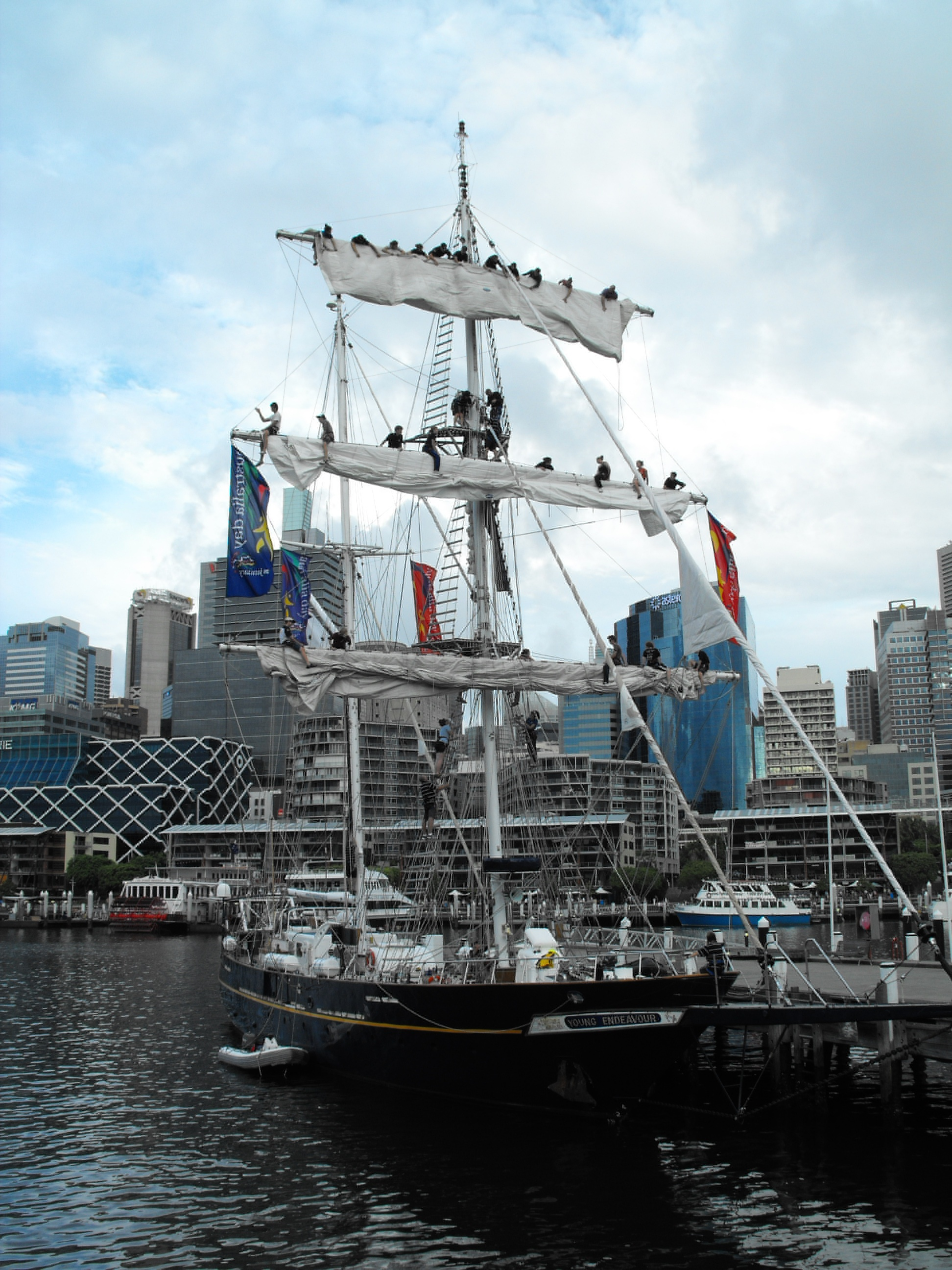
The youth crew of Young Endeavour manning the mast after the ship's arrival at the Australian National Maritime Museum

The sail training ship Young Endeavour was built as a gift from the United Kingdom to Australia for the latter's 1988 bicentenary of colonisation. Built by British shipbuilder Brooke Marine, the brigantine rig vessel is operated by the RAN, but is used to facilitate the Young Endeavour Youth Scheme; a sail training program for Australian youth aged between 16 and 23. A 10-strong RAN crew is supplemented by 24–30 youth on ten-day voyages, with 500 applicants selected every year through two ballots.

Name	Pennant number	In service	Homeport	Notes
Young Endeavour	–	25 January 1988	HMAS Waterhen	To be replaced by STS Young Endeavour II

=== National Support Squadron ===
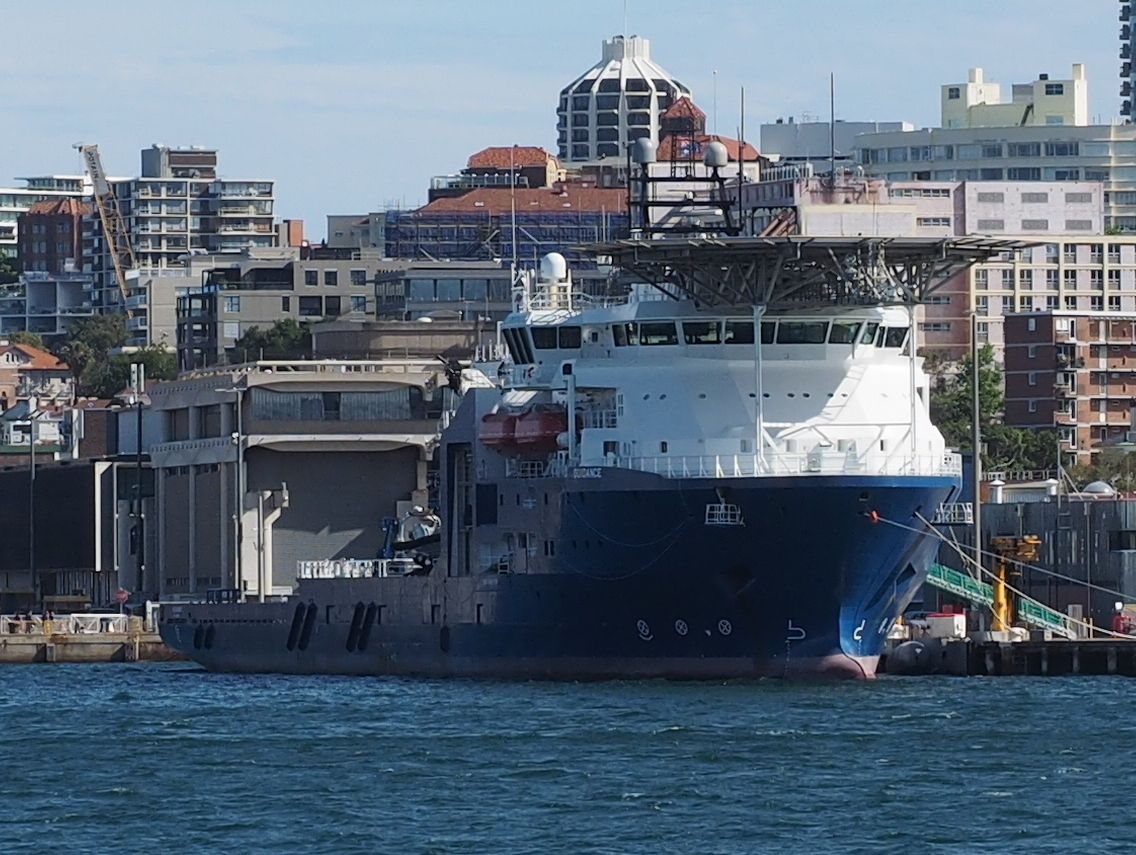
ADV Guidance at Fleet Base East in November 2023

In addition to commissioned ships, the RAN is supported by the National Support Squadron, which operates a variety of vessels by civilian companies under various contract arrangements, with their taskings and operations in support of Navy capabilities. This includes Teekay Shipping Australia, which operates with mainly civilian mariners and naval support staff for the tasking being undertaken. All ships within the National Support Squadron feature a uniform saphire blue hull and white superstructure.

National Support Squadron
Name	Vessel type	Class	In service	Notes
MV Mercator	Navigation training vessel	-	1998	
MV Besant	Submarine rescue ship	-	2015	
MV Stoker	Submarine rescue ship	-	2016	carries the LR5 submarine rescue vehicle
ADV Ocean Protector	Auxiliary naval vessel	-	2016	conducts border protection duties
MV Sycamore	Aviation training vessel	-	2017	
ADV Reliant	Auxiliary naval vessel	-	2022	Pacific Support Vessel
ADV Guidance	Auxiliary naval vessel	-	2023	Undersea Support Vessel
ADV Cape Otway	Navigation training vessel	Cape	2022	Reroled to training vessel in 2025

== See also ==
- List of ships of the Royal Australian Navy
- List of DMS Maritime vessels
- List of Royal Australian Navy bases
- List of missiles of Australia - Royal Australian Navy
