= Skandi Bergen =

Two ships have been named Skandi Bergen:

- The first Skandi Bergen was launched in 2007, acquired by the Australian government in 2010, renamed Ocean Protector, and operated by Australian Customs from 2010 to 2014.
- The second Skandi Bergen was launched in 2011, acquired by the Australian government during construction, renamed, Ocean Shield, operated by the Royal Australian Navy from 2012 to 2014, then transferred to Customs.
