= MV Sycamore =

Ship launched in 2016

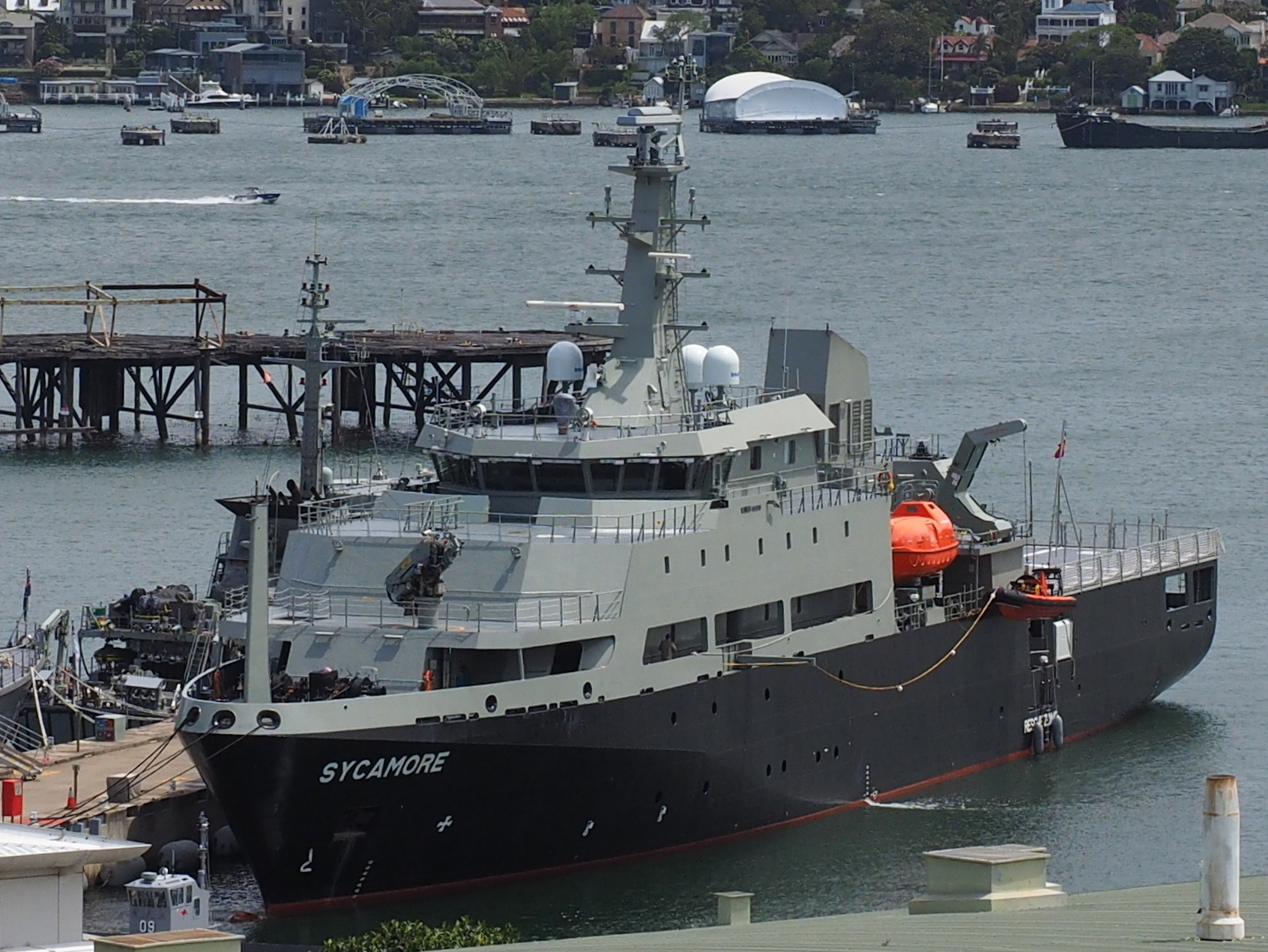
- MV Sycamore docked at HMAS Waterhen in December 2017

History

Australia
- Name: Sycamore
- Owner: Defence Maritime Services
- Operator: Teekay Shipping (Australia)
- Builder: Z189 Shipyard, Haiphong, Vietnam
- Laid down: 2014
- Launched: 30 August 2016
- In service: 4 August 2017
- Home port: Sydney
- Identification: MMSI number: 503000123; IMO number: 9758569; Call sign: VNSY
- Status: In active service

General characteristics
- Type: Training ship
- Displacement: 2,400 t (2,400 long tons) standard; 2,935 t (2,889 long tons) full load
- Length: 94 m (308 ft 5 in)
- Beam: 14.4 m (47 ft 3 in)
- Speed: 23 knots (43 km/h; 26 mph)
- Complement: 22
- Aviation facilities: Flight deck and hangar

MV Sycamore is a training ship developed to support the Royal Australian Navy (RAN) by Netherlands shipbuilders Damen Group. The vessel was built at Z189 Shipyard in Haiphong, Vietnam and launched in 2016, under Damen's license and contract. The ship is operated for the RAN's National Support Squadron by Teekay Australia and entered service in 2017.

== Design and description ==
Sycamore's design is based on that of the Damen OPV 2400 design for a 2,400-tonne offshore patrol vessel, a design that was also implemented for multiple vessels of Vietnam Coast Guard and Vietnam Fisheries Surveillance. The ship is 94 metres (308 ft 5 in) long with a beam of 14.4 metres (47 ft 3 in) and a draught of 3.9 metres (12 ft 10 in). has a standard displacement of 2,400 tonnes (2,400 long tons) and 2,935 t (2,889 long tons) at full load. The ship is powered by two diesel engines driving two shafts. The vessel has a designed top speed of 23 knots (43 km/h; 26 mph), with an actual max speed of 17.8 knots (33.0 km/h; 20.5 mph) and a range of 5,550 nautical miles (10,280 km; 6,390 mi) at 16.2 knots (30.0 km/h; 18.6 mph).

The RAN classes Sycamore as a "multi-role aircraft training vessel", and the ship is equipped with a hangar and a flight deck, allowing a single helicopter to land. Sycamore is the first ship to support the Australian Defence Force (ADF) designed from the outset to be able to operate unmanned aerial vehicles (UAVs). The vessel is fitted with the equipment necessary to operate Boeing Insitu ScanEagle fixed wing and Schiebel Camcopter S-100 rotary wing UAVs. Sycamore is equipped with Terma Scanter radar with a DBHG stabilized antenna and Terma C-Flex for support of the training mission of the vessel. She has a multi-use space, which can be configured to help cope with disasters. Sycamore will operate with two crews of 22 personnel who will maintain the vessel. The ship can accommodate up to 71 ADF personnel overnight.

== Construction and career ==
A tender was submitted by the Australian government for the construction of an offshore patrol vessel. The Abbott government chose the Damen Group's proposal to build the vessel in Vietnam as they found that no Australian shipbuilder was capable of building the type of ship requested in the tender within the budget and time frame required. Sycamore was constructed at the Z189 Shipyard in Haiphong, Vietnam and laid down in 2014. The vessel was launched on 30 August 2016. The RAN does not own the vessel, it leases Sycamore from the Serco-owned firm DMS Maritime. The vessel has a civilian crew provided by Teekay Australia. Military personnel provide the actual training aboard the vessel. While Sycamore is used primarily as an aviation training ship, the vessel is also used for familiarisation training for new RAN officers, mine warfare and diving support training as well as recovering training torpedoes and missiles and serving as a consort. Sycamore is the RAN's first dedicated training ship since HMAS Jervis Bay was decommissioned in 1994.

Sycamore completed sea trials in April 2017. She arrived at Sydney on 26 June that year. Sycamore entered service with the RAN on 4 August 2017. In January 2020, Sycamore was deployed to the coast of Victoria in response to the bushfires in the region.

In 2021 the RAN entered into negotiations with Damen to purchase a ship based on Sycamore's design that could be used for humanitarian assistance in the Pacific. These negotiations ended in failure, and the RAN acquired a secondhand offshore supply vessel instead which entered service in 2022 as the ADV Reliant.
