= Teekay Petrojarl =

- Company type: Public
- Traded as: (OSE: PETRO)
- Industry: Petroleum
- Founded: 1974 (Golar Nor Offshore)
- Headquarters: Trondheim, Norway
- Key people: Peter Lytzen (CEO)
- Products: Floating Production Storage and Offloading
- Number of employees: ca.1,000 (2012)
- Parent: Teekay Corporation (TK)
- Website: http://www.teekay.com/

Teekay Petrojarl was the largest Floating Production Storage and Offloading (FPSO) operator in the North Sea with a daily production of 339,000 barrels of oil per day and a storage capacity of 1 million barrels (160,000 m^{3}) of crude oil. Teekay Petrojarl operated five FPSO vessels, two shuttle tankers and one storage tanker. It was owned by Teekay, a large operator of tankers until purchased by Brookfield Asset Management, becoming Altera Infrastructure.

== History ==
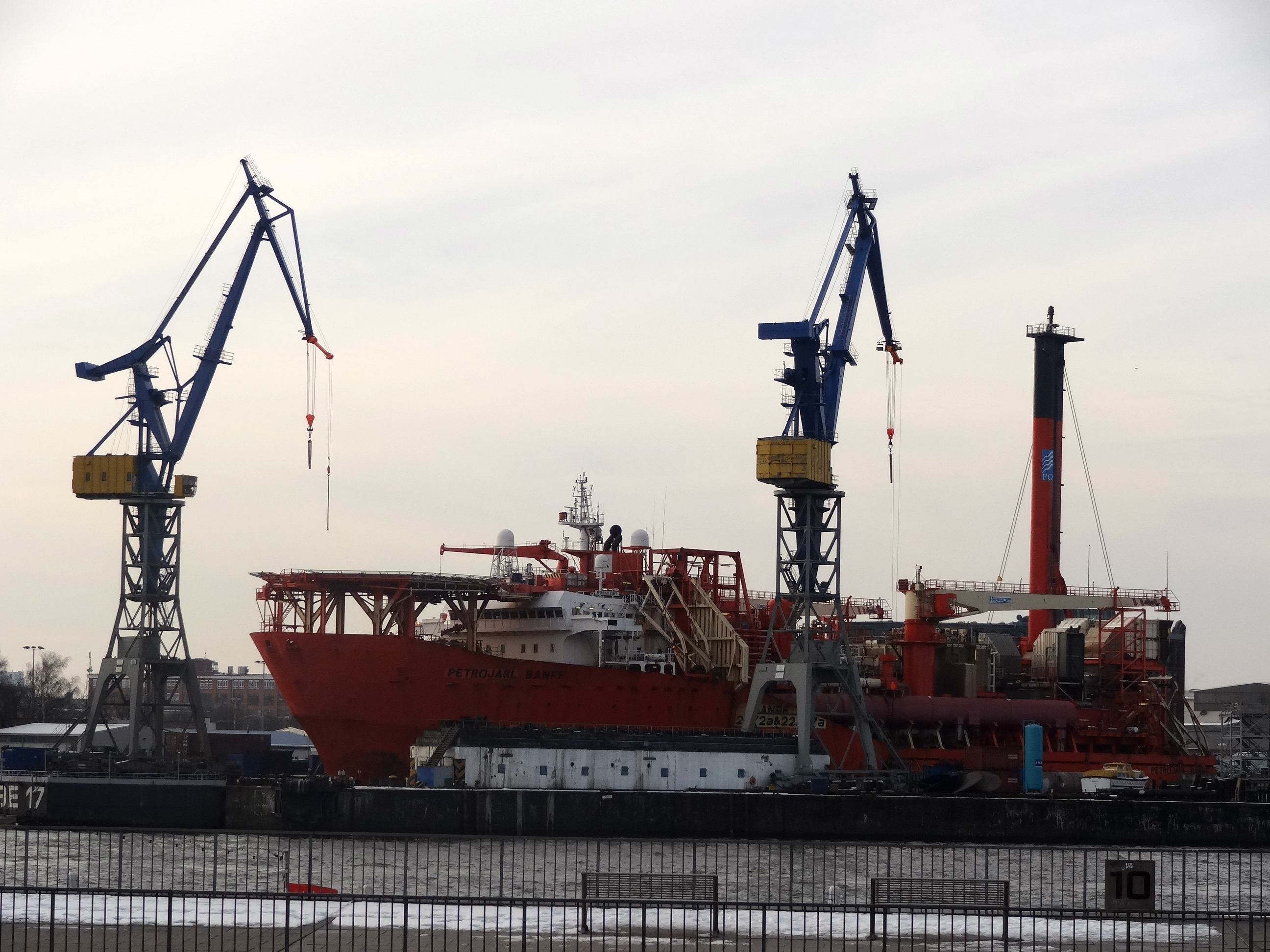
Petrojarl Banff at Blohm + Voss shipbuilding works in Hamburg 2013

Teekay Petrojarl started off as Golar Nor Offshore and was part of Petroleum Geo-Services (PGS) in 1998 when it acquired Golar-Nor and two FPSO vessels, Petrojarl I and Petrojarl Foinaven. Within a year two more vessels were delivered Petrojarl Banff and Petrojarl Varg. In 2005 the company acquired the shuttle tanker Rita Knutsen with possibilities for FPSO conversion. In 2007, the Russian tanker Che Guevara was converted into FPSO Petrojarl Cidade de Rio das Ostras by the Polish Remontowa S.A.

Petrojarl ASA was demerged from Petroleum Geo-Services in 2006 and listed on Oslo Stock Exchange in June. Teekay acquired majority ownership in December and Petrojarl ASA became Teekay Petrojarl ASA.

== Operations ==
Oil Field	Country	Licensee	Vessel	Status
Glitne (Shutdown)	Norway	StatoilHydro	Petrojarl I FPSO	Yard for Timor L'Este, Kuda-Tasi
Varg (Shutdown)	Norway	Talisman Energy	Petrojarl Varg FPSO	Svetah Venetia at India, PY-03
Knarr (Shutdown)	Norway	Shell	Petrojarl Knarr FPSO	Petrojarl Rosebank at UK, Rosebank
Gina Krog	Norway	Statoil	Randgrid FSO	Yard - Odisseia for Brazil, Enchova
Foinaven (Shutdown)	United Kingdom	BP	Petrojarl Foinaven FPSO	Scrapped 2022
Banff (Shutdown)	United Kingdom	Canadian Natural Resources	Petrojarl Banff FPSO	Scrapped 2021
Chestnut (Shutdown)	United Kingdom	Centrica	Sevan Hummingbird FPSO	Yard - Excalibur for UK, Avalon
Huntington (Shutdown)	United Kingdom	Premier Oil	Voyageur Spirit FPSO	Petrojarl Kong at Cote d'Ivoire, Baleine
Tartaruga Verde	Brazil	Petrobras	Petrojarl Cidade de Rio das Ostras FPSO	Scrapped 2020
Baúna field	Brazil	Petrobras	Cidade de Itajai FPSO	Operational
Libra field	Brazil	Petrobras	Pioneiro De Libra FPSO	Operational
Piranema field	Brazil	Petrobras	Piranema Spirit FPSO	Laidup Angra Dos Reis
Bacia de Campos	Brazil	Petrobras	Arendal Spirit Flotel	Nor Spirit, operational (worldwide)
Al Rayyan field	Qatar	QatarEnergy	Falcon Spirit FSO	Scrapped 2022
Bualuang field	Thailand	Salamander Energy	Suksan Salamander FSO	Operational
