= National Support Squadron (Royal Australian Navy) =

National Support Squadron (RAN)
- Active: 2022-present
- Country: Australia
- Type: Naval Squadron
- Role: Auxiliary
- Part of: Royal Australian Navy
- Livery: Saphire-blue hull and white superstructure
- Strength: 8 ships

The Royal Australian Navy's (RAN) National Support Squadron is a fleet of auxiliary naval vessels that provide critical non-combat support to the RAN's operations. These ships enhance the Navy's logistical and operational capabilities, particularly in regional engagements and humanitarian missions as well as supporting the introduction of unmanned systems. These ships are crewed through a partnership between the RAN and civilian mariners from Teekay Shipping Australia Pty Ltd. Each vessel has a permanent naval liaison officer on board, and additional mission-specific personnel from the Australian Defence Force or other government agencies can be embarked as needed. Medical services are provided by Opstar Pty Ltd, a Nowra-based search and rescue specialist company.

== Role ==
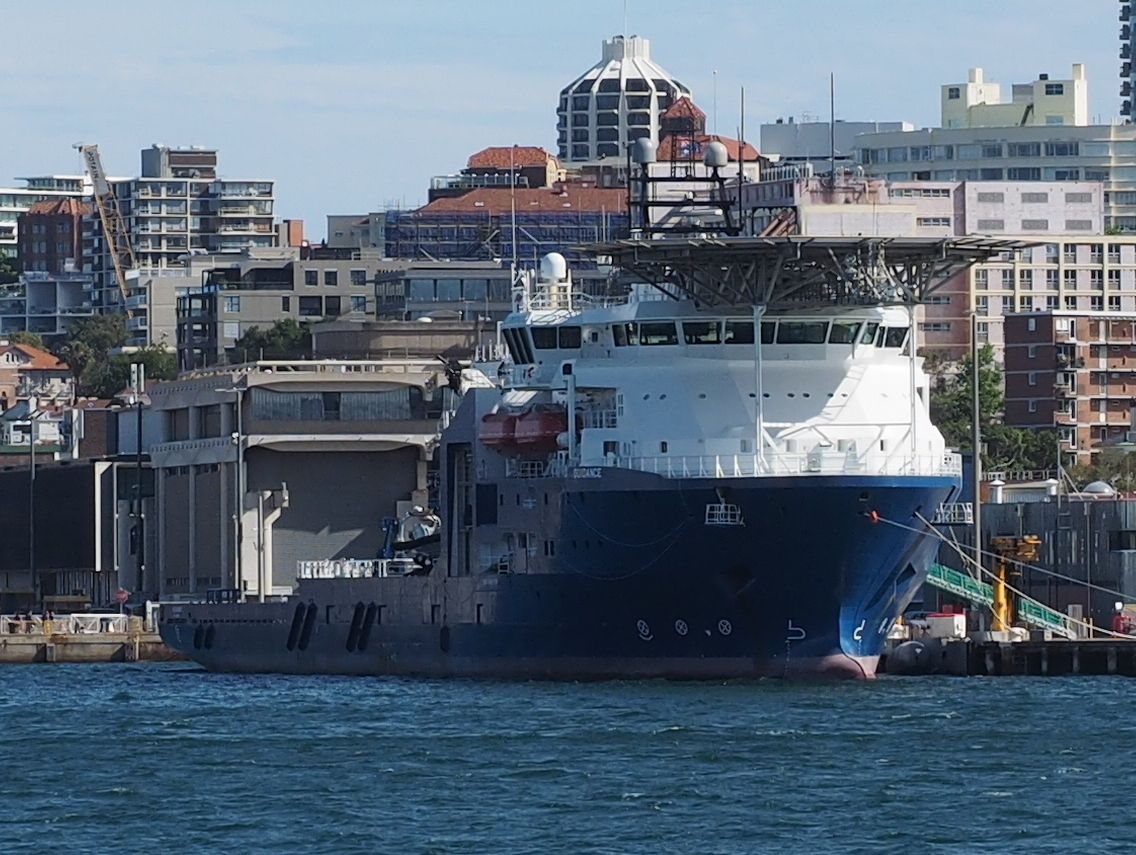
ADV Guidance at Fleet Base East in November 2023

The National Support Squadron plays a vital role in the RAN's regional engagement strategies including but not limited to training, submarine search and rescue, humanitarian aid and the introduction of unmanned systems.

For instance, the ADV Reliant has been deployed to the South-West Pacific to provide aid to Pacific nations.

== List of active vessels ==
Name	Vessel type	Class	Entered service	Notes
MV Mercator	Navigation training vessel	-	1998	
MV Besant	Submarine rescue ship	-	2015	
MV Stoker	Submarine rescue ship	-	2016	Carries the LR5 submarine rescue vehicle
ADV Ocean Protector	Auxiliary naval vessel	-	2016	Conducts border protection duties
MV Sycamore	Aviation training vessel	-	2017	
ADV Reliant	Auxiliary naval vessel	-	2022	Pacific Support Vessel
ADV Guidance	Auxiliary naval vessel	-	2023	Undersea Support Vessel
ADV Cape Otway	Navigation training vessel	Cape-class	2022	Reroled to training vessel in 2025

== See also ==
- Royal Australian Navy
- List of active Royal Australian Navy ships
