= ADV Guidance =

Auxiliary ship of Royal Australian Navy

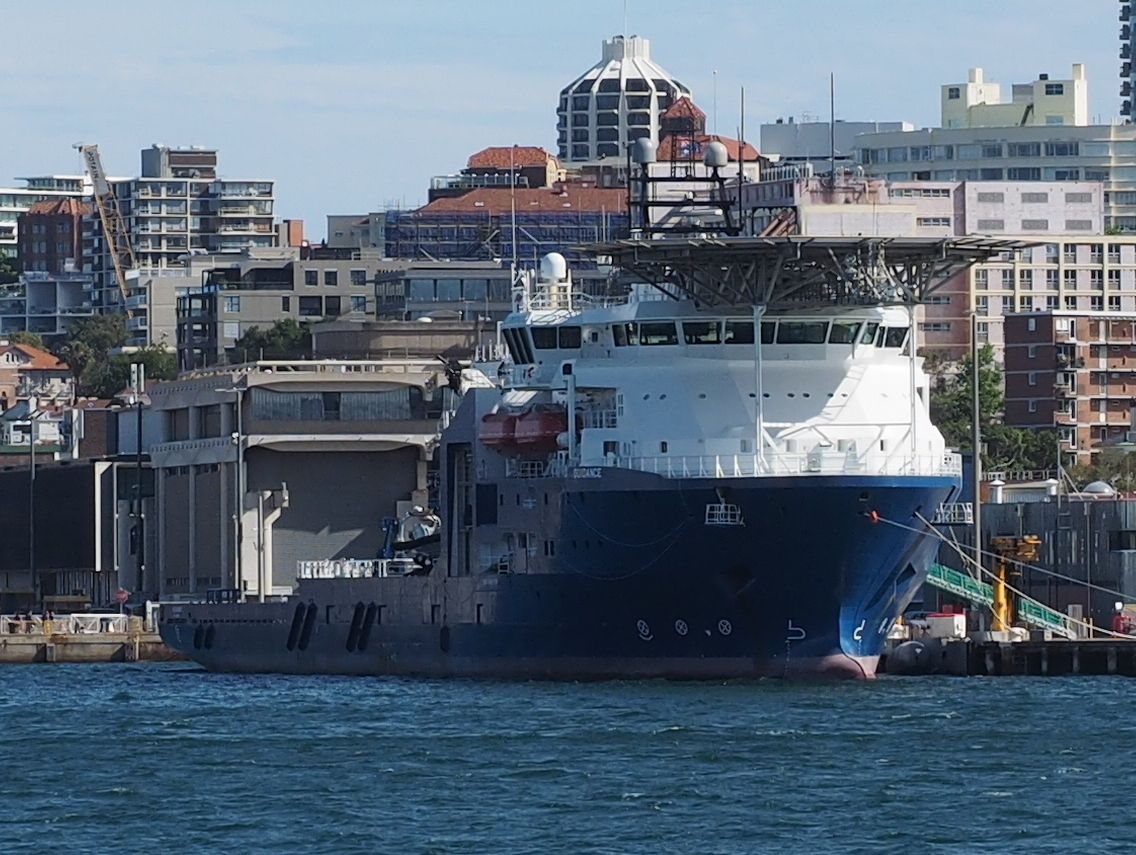
- ADV Guidance in 2023

History

Australia
- Name: Guidance
- Owner: Royal Australian Navy
- Operator: Teekay Shipping Australia
- Builder: Kleven Verft, Norway
- Launched: 2013
- In service: 2023
- Home port: Sydney
- Identification: Call Sign : VMQE; IMO number: 9661170; MMSI number: 503000221

Norway
- Name: Normand Jarl
- Owner: Normand Ships AS
- In service: 2017
- Out of service: 2023
- Home port: Skudeneshavn, Norway

Bahamas
- Name: REM Installer
- Owner: REM Offshore
- In service: 2013
- Out of service: 2017
- Home port: Nassau, Bahamas

General characteristics
- Type: Marin Teknikk MT 6022
- Length: 107 m (351 ft 1 in)
- Beam: 22 m (72 ft 2 in)
- Complement: Core crew of 19
- Aviation facilities: Helicopter pad only

Australian Defence Vessel (ADV) Guidance is an auxiliary ship operated for the Royal Australian Navy's (RAN) National Support Squadron by Teekay Shipping Australia. The ship was purchased in February 2023 to serve as the RAN's undersea support vessel.

== Acquisition ==
In December 2022, the offshore supply vessel Normand Jarl was sold by Solstad Offshore, with Defence Australia later announcing the acquisition in April 2023 at a price of AU$110 million. This ship had been built in Norway, and originally entered service in 2013. Following the purchase the ship underwent maintenance and checks in Singapore, and sailed for Australia in September 2023. She was renamed Australian Defence Vessel (ADV) Guidance while in Singapore and given a new homeport of Sydney.

== Characteristics ==
Guidance has a displacement of approximately 7,400 tons, and is 107 metres (351 ft 1 in) long and 22 metres (72 ft 2 in) wide. She has a large cargo deck and a crane. The ship's bridge, helipad and crew accommodation is located in her large forward superstructure.

== Operational service ==
Guidance is part of the RAN's National Support Squadron as of 2025 and is mainly used for USV and UUV trials for the RAN. The vessel was modified to carry 2 davit-launched Zodiac RHIBs.
