= ADV Reliant =

Auxiliary ship of Royal Australian Navy

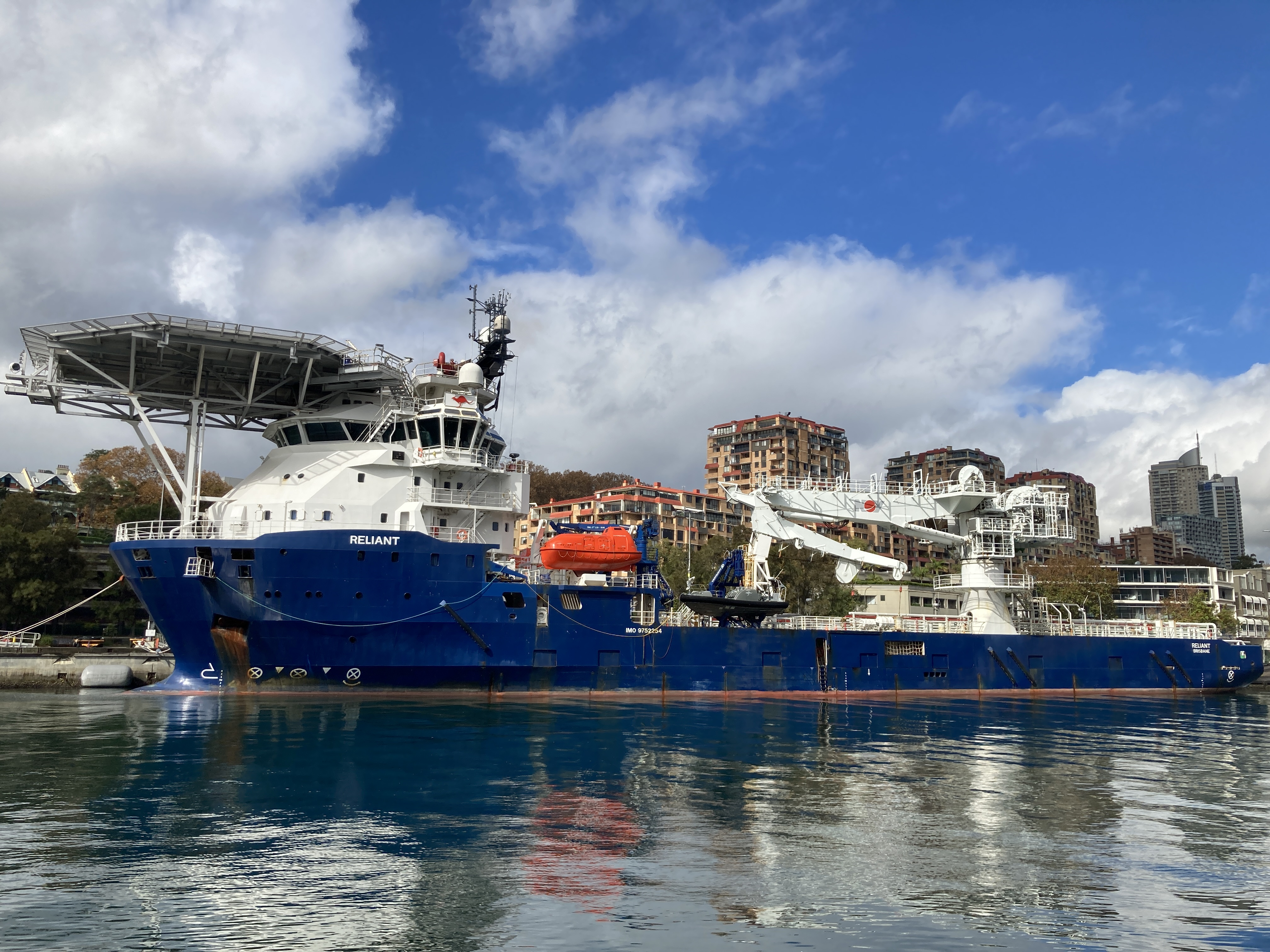
- ADV Reliant in 2024

History

Australia
- Name: Reliant
- Owner: Royal Australian Navy
- Operator: Teekay Shipping Australia
- Builder: Kleven Verft, Norway
- Launched: 2015
- In service: 2022
- Home port: Brisbane
- Identification: MMSI number: 503000206; IMO number: 9752254

History

Canada
- Name: Horizon Star
- Owner: Horizon Maritime
- In service: 2017
- Out of service: 2022
- Home port: St. John's, Canada

General characteristics
- Type: Marin Teknikk MT 6015
- Length: 103 metres (338 ft)
- Beam: 20 metres (66 ft)
- Complement: Core crew of 19
- Armament: None
- Aviation facilities: Helicopter pad only
- Notes: Carries LCVP

Australian Defence Vessel (ADV) Reliant is an auxiliary ship operated for the Royal Australian Navy's (RAN) National Support Squadron by Teekay Shipping Australia. The ship was purchased in February 2022 to serve as the RAN's Pacific support vessel.

== Acquisition ==
The Australian Government announced in November 2018 that a large vessel was to be built for the RAN in Australia to undertake humanitarian tasks in the Pacific. This formed part of the government's "Pacific step-up" diplomatic initiative. The Minister for Defence said the ship would be constructed in Western Australia. The 2020 Force Structure Plan stated that a Pacific support vessel would be built in Australia.

During a Senate Estimates hearing in October 2021, Department of Defence officials stated that the government had decided instead to purchase the ship from overseas rather than build it in Australia. This decision had not been previously announced, and followed reports that the Australian shipbuilding industry lacked the capacity to construct the ship due to other priorities. The opposition Labor Party was critical of this decision, but the government stated that it would allow the ship to enter service earlier.

In February 2022, the offshore supply vessel Horizon Star was purchased for US$67 million from Canadian company Horizon Maritime. This ship had been built in Norway, and originally entered service in 2017. Following the purchase the ship underwent maintenance and checks in the Canary Islands, and sailed for Australia in May 2022. She was renamed Australian Defence Vessel (ADV) Reliant while in the Canary Islands.

== Characteristics ==
Reliant has a displacement of approximately 5,600 tons, and is 103 metres (338 ft) long and 20 metres (66 ft) wide. She has a large cargo deck and a crane. The ship's bridge, helipad and crew accommodation is located in her large forward superstructure. The ship "can produce thousands of litres of fresh water per day".

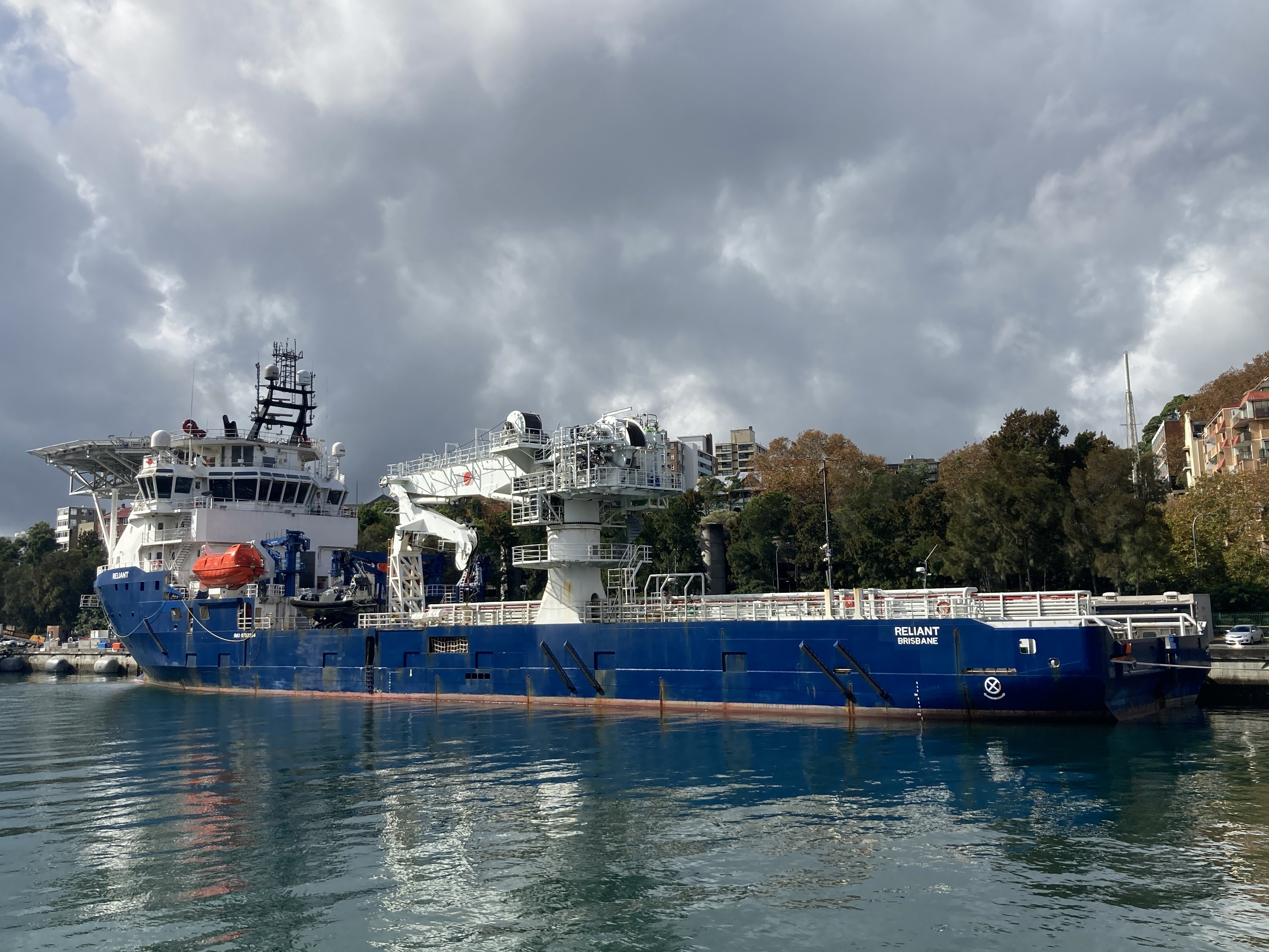
Reliant's stern, showing the cargo deck and crane

In September 2022, the Chief of Navy, Vice Admiral Mark Hammond, stated that the tasks Reliant is capable of included "marine survey, delivering heavy equipment, search and rescue training, and disaster relief and recovery".

The ship's capabilities upon delivery were criticised. She lacks the ability to operate landing craft. She also cannot embark a helicopter due to the absence of a hangar or aviation fuel storage facilities, and there is no direct connection between the cargo deck and helipad. The Australian Defence Magazine has written that these missing features are "widely seen as crucial for successful HADR [humanitarian assistance and disaster relief] operations, as they enable infrastructure independent transport". An article by the retired RAN officer Bob Moyse published by the Australian Strategic Policy Institute stated that "the Reliant is likely to be of limited use for disaster relief" due to these issues.

Under project SEA 3033 Phase 2, Reliant is to receive an upgrade. While the goals of the project have not been announced, the Australian Defence Magazine stated that they may include improvements to her helicopter and landing craft capabilities and possibly fitting the ship with small calibre weapons. Moyse argued that these upgrades would not make Reliant fit for her intended purpose, as she can only enter deep ports and cargo would need to be loaded onto the landing craft with the ship's crane, which is an not an efficient approach.

As of 2024 Reliant was crewed by a civilian crew of 18, augmented by four RAN sailors, a Navy liaison officer and two Australian Army soldiers.

The RAN ordered two light landing craft in July 2024 to operate from Reliant. They are expected to be delivered in the first half of 2025. The craft will replace the LCVP which Reliant currently embarks and are expected to be larger and faster.

== Operational service ==
During its voyage to Australia, Reliant supported RAN activities in Fiji and patrolled the exclusive economic zones of the Cook Islands and Samoa.

As of August 2022, Reliant formed part of the RAN's National Support Squadron. Like the other ships in the squadron, she is crewed by civilian mariners employed by Teekay Shipping Australia and a single RAN naval liaison officer. In September 2022, the crew comprised 18 Teekay employees and a RAN officer. Other personnel will be embarked when needed for specific tasks. Reliant is based in Brisbane and is scheduled to operate in the Pacific for 250 to 300 days annually. The Australian Defence Force will control the ship, with taskings being determined in consultation with the Department of Foreign Affairs and Trade.

In March 2023 Reliant was used to recover an Army MRH-90 helicopter that had ditched at Jervis Bay. Reliant was one of several ships used to recover wreckage from an MRH-90 that crashed into the sea near Lindeman Island in Queensland during a training exercise in July 2023.
