= ADV Ocean Protector =

Auxiliary naval vessel of the Royal Australian Navy

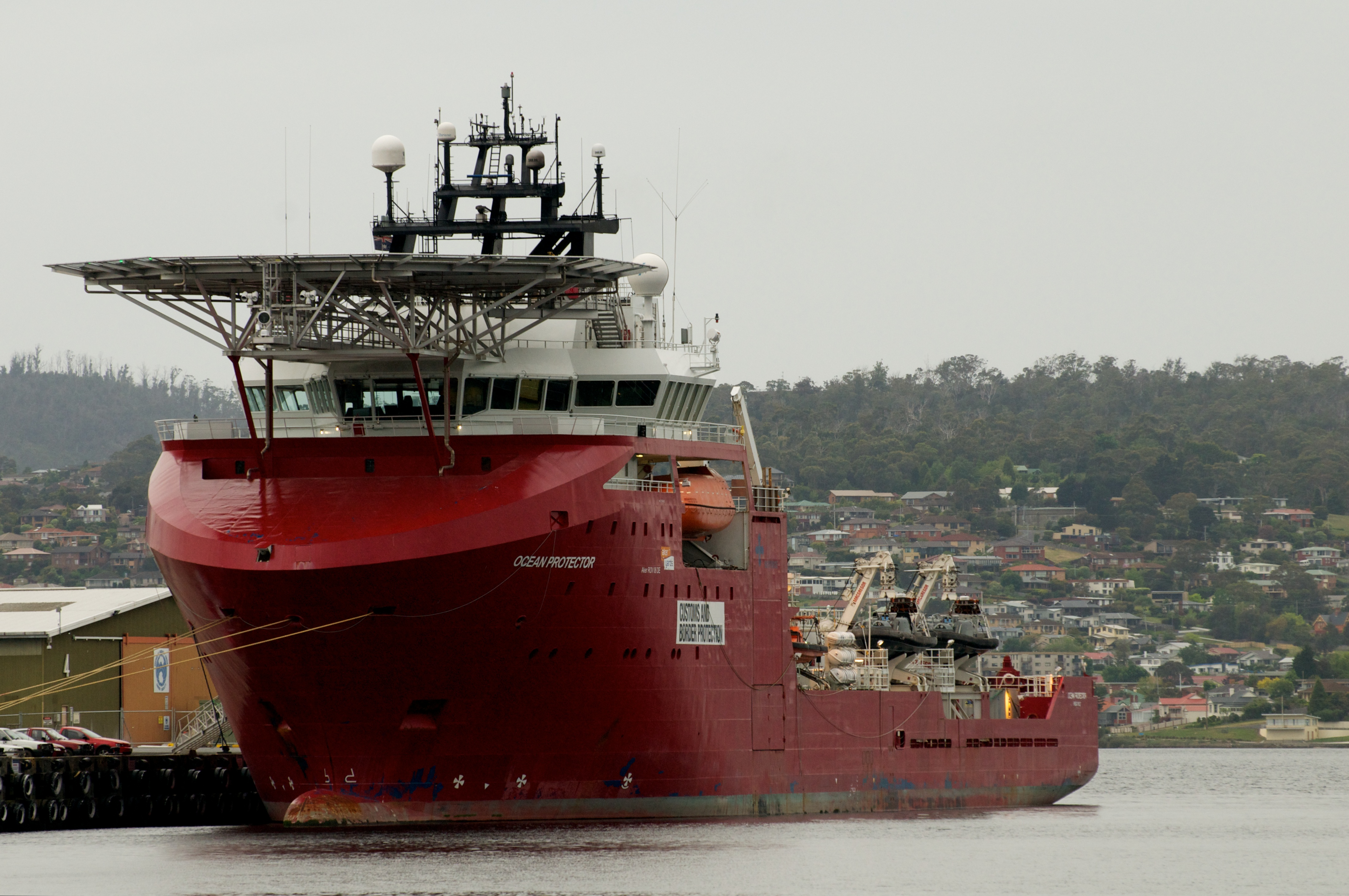
- ACV Ocean Protector in Hobart, October 2011

History

Australia
- Name: Ocean Protector
- Owner: Royal Australian Navy
- Operator: Teekay
- Builder: Aker Yards ASA, Tulcea, Romania
- Yard number: 152
- Laid down: 25 August 2006
- Launched: 28 January 2007
- Completed: 3 August 2007
- Acquired: November 2015
- In service: January 2016
- Home port: Fremantle, Australia
- Identification: MMSI number: 503630000; IMO number: 9374260; Call sign: VHDM
- Status: In Service

History
- Name: 2006-2007: Geo Bergen; 2007-2010: Skandi Bergen; 2010-2015: Ocean Protector; 2015: Skandi Protector
- Owner: 2006-2015: DOF Subsea Rederi II AS
- Operator: 2006-2010: DOF Management AS; 2010-2014: Australian Customs and Border Protection Service; 2015: DOF Management AS
- Home port: 2006-2010: Nassau, Bahamas; 2010-2014: Fremantle, Australia; 2015: Nassau, Bahamas

General characteristics
- Type: ROV Support Vessel
- Tonnage: 6,596 gross tons
- Displacement: 8,500 tonnes full load
- Length: 105.9 metres (347 ft)
- Beam: 21.02 metres (69.0 ft)
- Draught: 6.6 metres (22 ft)
- Propulsion: Diesel-electric; 4 x Wärtsilä 63L2 diesels, 14,804 horsepower (11,039 kW); 2 x motors, 6,438 horsepower (4,801 kW); 2 x directional propellers
- Speed: 16 knots (30 km/h; 18 mph)
- Range: 23,000 nautical miles (43,000 km; 26,000 mi) at 14 knots (26 km/h; 16 mph); 9,200 nautical miles (17,000 km; 10,600 mi) at 16 knots (30 km/h; 18 mph)
- Boats & landing craft carried: 2 x 8.5 m (28 ft) rigid hull Customs Rescue Tenders
- Capacity: 120 in austere accommodation
- Crew: 22 ship's crew, 50 Customs personnel
- Armament: 2 × deck mounted .50 caliber machine guns
- Aviation facilities: Helicopter platform

Australian Defence Vessel (ADV) Ocean Protector is an auxiliary naval vessel of the Royal Australian Navy's (RAN) National Support Squadron, manned and managed by Teekay.

== Design and construction ==
The ship has a full-load displacement of 8,500 tonnes, a tonnage value of 6,596 gross tons, is 105.9 metres (347 ft) in overall length, with a beam of 21.02 metres (69.0 ft), and a draught of 6.6 metres (22 ft). The propulsion machinery is diesel-electric. Four Wärtsilä 6L32 diesels, providing a total of 14,804 horsepower (11,039 kW), generate electricity, which is directed to two 6,438 horsepower (4,801 kW) motors driving directional propellers. Top speed is 16 knots (30 km/h; 18 mph), with a range of 9,200 nautical miles (17,000 km; 10,600 mi). Sustainable range is 23,000 nautical miles (43,000 km; 26,000 mi) at 14 knots (26 km/h; 16 mph). A platform suitable for landing a medium helicopter is sited forward, above the bridge. For offshore support duties, 1,100 square metres (12,000 sq ft) of deck area is available, and a 140 tonne crane is fitted.

In Australian Customs service, the ship's normal complement was made up of 22 ship's crew contracted from Teekay, plus up to 50 Customs and associated personnel, along with austere accommodation for a further 120 in a retrofitted deckhouse module. Two .50 caliber machine guns were fitted, along with two 8.5-metre (28 ft) rigid hull Customs Rescue Tenders.

== Operational history ==
The ship was laid down at the Aker Yards ASA in Tulcea, Romania on 25 August 2006 as a ROV support vessel for Norwegian shipping company DOF Subsea. Based on the Aker ROV 06 DE design, it was named Geo Bergen during construction and launched on 28 January 2007. The ship was renamed to Skandi Bergen on 19 July 2007 prior to its completion on 3 August 2007.

In mid-2010, the Australian government chartered the ship for the Australian Customs and Border Protection Service, as a replacement for MV Oceanic Viking. The ship was chartered to Customs through DMAA Seaforce. Modifications for Customs service were made by Forgacs Engineering in Newcastle, New South Wales, including the installation of the austere accommodation and medical deckhouse (the latter staffed by a doctor drawn from the Australian Antarctic Division), fitting of weapons and davits for the two Customs tenders, modification and expansion of crew recreation facilities, and sealing of the ship's moon pools. On completion, the ship was renamed and redesignated "Australian Customs Vessel (ACV) Ocean Protector". Ocean Protector entered Customs Service in October 2010.

During November 2010, the vessel intercepted suspected drug smugglers off Queensland, and intercepted two asylum seeker boats off Christmas Island in November 2010.

In January 2012, Ocean Protector retrieved three Australian anti-whaling activists who had boarded MV Shōnan Maru 2.

In November 2015, DOF announced the sale of the vessel to the Australian government for NOK 300 million, with the ship to be handed over in early 2016. Upon completion of the sale, the ship was renamed the Australian Defense Vessel (ADV) Ocean Protector.

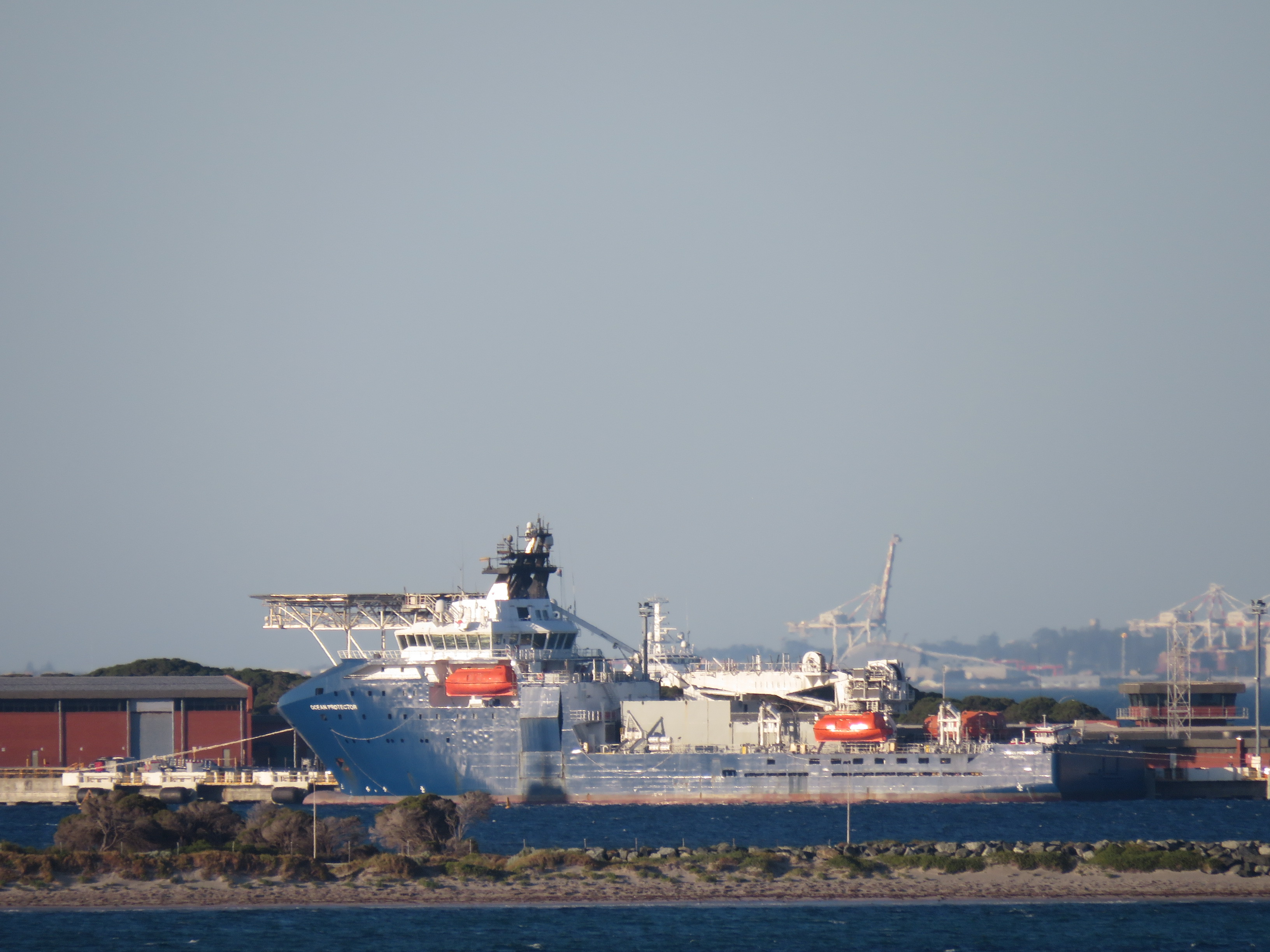
ADV Ocean Protector at HMAS Stirling in her blue and white National Support Squadron livery.

As of 2021, the ship is operating as an Auxiliary Navy Ship manned and managed by Teekay. The ship was recently called upon to assist in offloading cargo from MV Borkum to the wharf at Christmas Island by acting as an artificial lee as severe weather hampered it from getting closer to the wharf.
