= LCVP (Australia) =

Australian landing craft class

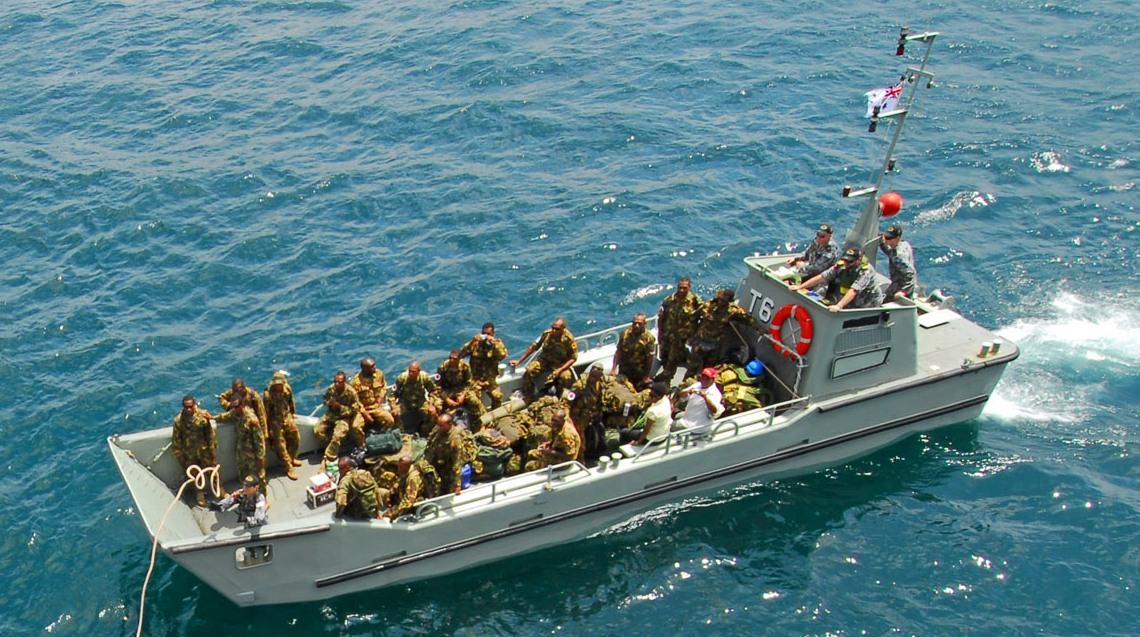
- Royal Australian Navy LCVP T 6 in 2010

Class overview
- Builders: Geraldton Boat Builders
- Operators: Royal Australian Navy
- Built: 1993
- In service: 1993–current
- Completed: 4
- Active: 4

General characteristics
- Type: Landing craft
- Displacement: 5.5 tons
- Length: 13.2 m (43 ft)
- Beam: 3.36 m (11.0 ft)
- Draught: 0.5 m (1.6 ft)
- Ramps: Bow ramp
- Propulsion: 2 x Volvo Penta diesels, 2 x propellers
- Speed: 21 knots (39 km/h; 24 mph)
- Capacity: 36 personnel or a Land Rover with a half-ton trailer
- Complement: 3
- Notes: Data from

Since 1993, the Royal Australian Navy has operated four Australian-designed and built Landing Craft, Vehicle and Personnel (similar in size and concept to the World War II LCVP) from the landing ship, heavy HMAS Tobruk, replenishment oiler HMAS Success, LSD HMAS Choules and Pacific support vessel ADV Reliant. These aluminum craft were built by Geraldton Boat Builders and can carry up to 36 personnel or a Land Rover with a half-ton trailer. They are maintained for the RAN by the firm DMS Maritime. As of 2022, T4 and T5 are carried by ADV Reliant.

In July 2024 the RAN ordered two light landing craft to operate from the auxiliary ship ADV Reliant instead of LCVPs. The new craft will be larger and faster than the LCVPs.
