= Teekay =

Canadian shipping company

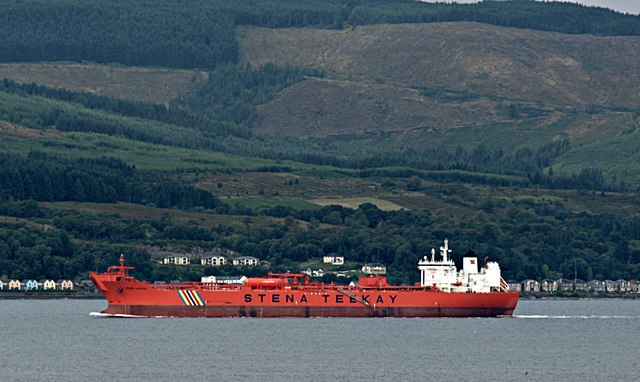
- Stena Teekay MV Alexita passing Dunoon
- Type: Public
- Traded as: NYSE: TK; NYSE: TNK (Teekay Tankers); Russell 2000 Component (TK, TNK)
- Industry: Maritime transport, Petroleum
- Founded: 1973
- Headquarters: Vancouver, Canada
- Key people: Torben Karlshoej (founder), Kenneth Hvid (CEO)
- Parent: Teekay Corporation (TK)
- Website: http://www.teekay.com/

Teekay is a Canadian shipping corporation which specialises in shipping crude oil.

== History ==
Teekay was founded in 1973 by Torben Karlshoej, then a 31 year old Danish ship broker who had emigrated to the United States at the age of 20 and mostly worked on farms. The company was named "TK" for Karlshoej's initials. It commenced operations by purchasing small second and third hand oil tankers, a lucrative trade due to the high oil prices during the 1973–1974 oil crisis. It maintained a head office in the Bahamas, thus taking advantage of low corporate taxes. Most of its ships were registered in Liberia, thus taking advantage of the comparatively low taxes and the ability to recruit seafarers from across the world. The company grew in the 1980s by operating in the risky waters off Persian Gulf during the Iran–Iraq War. In 2017, Teekay was a joint owner in Bapco, an oil project in Bahrain. Among its former board members are Eileen Mercier, who retired from the board in 2018.

Under Karlshoej's leadership, the company grew further from a tanker operator to an operational ship owner in the conventional shipping market. Over the years, Teekay expanded across new segments including gas and offshore. Teekay currently operates under two companies that are publicly traded on the New York Stock Exchange: Teekay Corporation and Teekay Tankers.

== Offshore operations ==
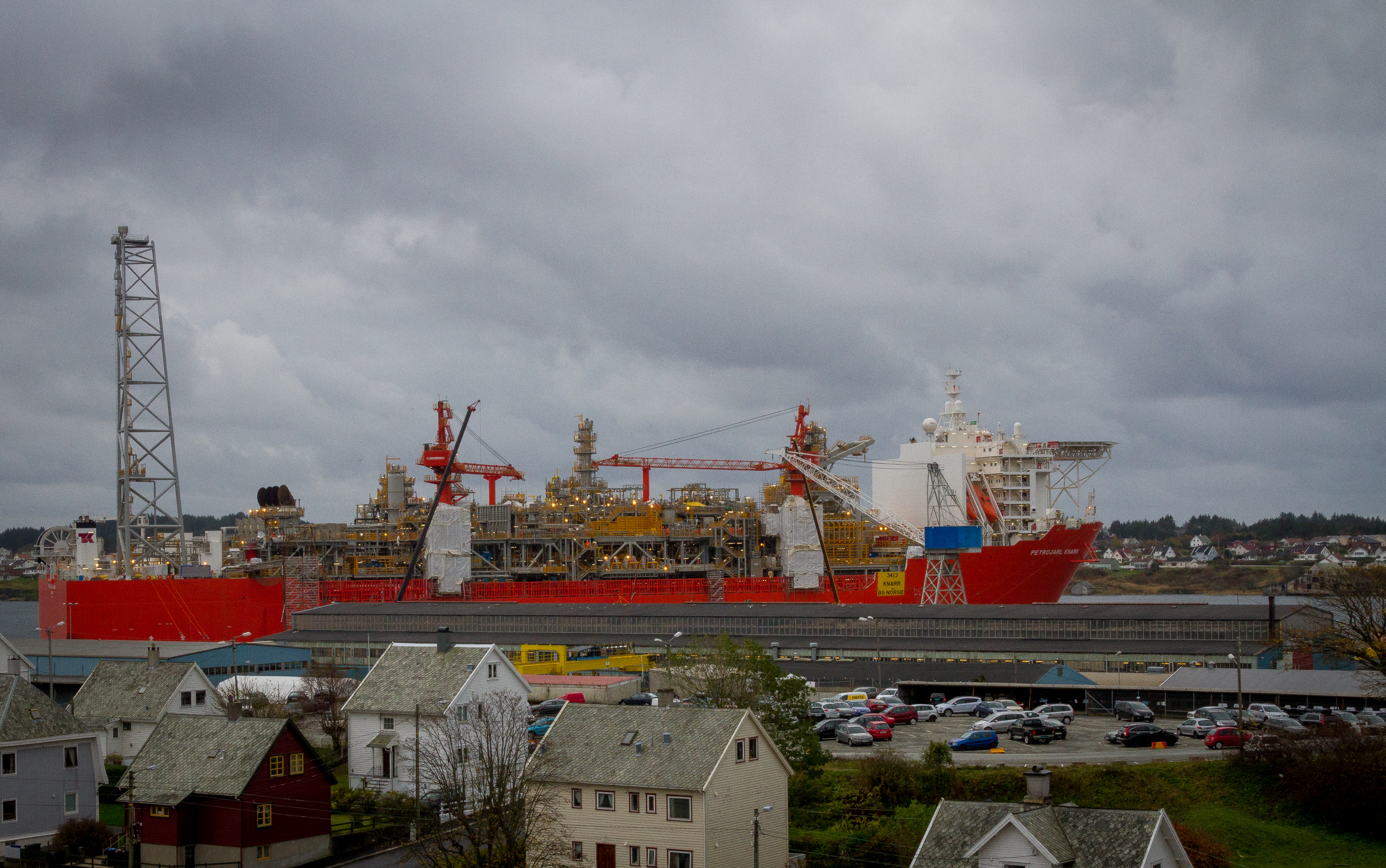
This is the FPSO Petrojarl Knarr designed for offshore oil production. It was owned in 2015 by shipping company Teekay, and was built by Samsung Heavy Industry’s shipyard in South Korea. It will be operating from Q4 2014 in the Norwegian sector of the North Sea for British company BG Group, producing 63,000 barrels of oil per day. Here it is shot at the Aibel shipyard in Haugesund, Norway as it undergoes final preparations before leaving for the North Sea.

In 1998, Teekay commenced operations under what is now called Petrojarl. It commenced offshore oil exploration as Golar Nor Offshore, a part of Petroleum Geo-Services (PGS) and Golar-Nor.

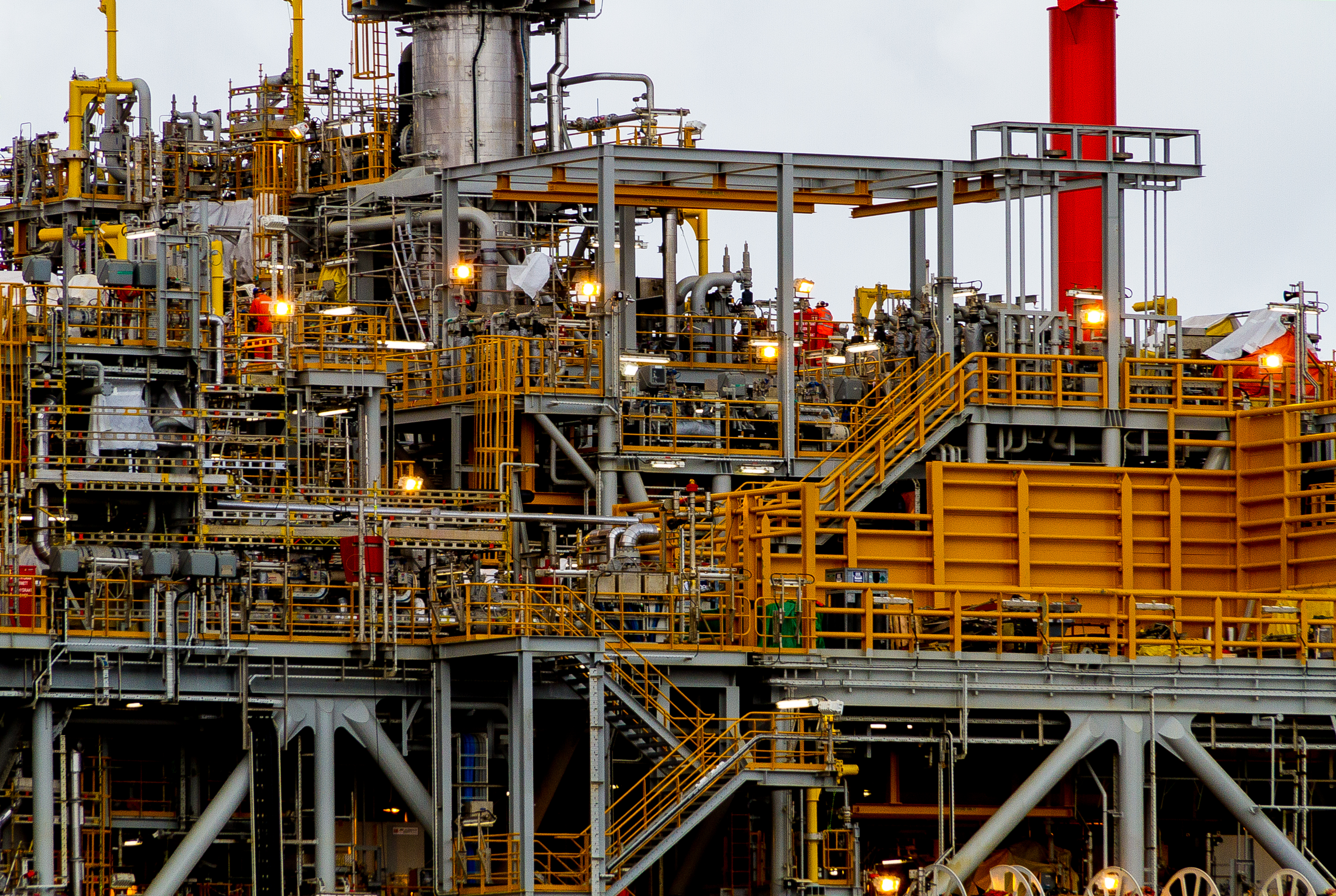
Close-up view of FPSO Petrojarl Knarr on 25 October 2014 just before it was commissioned

In December 2002, Teekay acquired Navion ASA from Statoil. The acquisition was successfully completed on April 7, 2003, and the included shuttle tanker subsidiary, Ugland Nordic Shipping (UNS) became known as Teekay Navion Shuttle Tankers & Offshore (TNSTO), with their headquarters in Stavanger, Norway.

In August 2006, Teekay further expanded their Offshore business with the acquisition of Petrojarl ASA. In 2008, Teekay acquired all remaining shares of the company.

In 2005 the company purchased the shuttle tanker Rita Knutsen. This was followed in 2007, with the Russian tanker Che Guevara which was subsequently converted into the FPSO Petrojarl Cidade de Rio das Ostras. In 2006, Petrojarl ASA was demerged from Petroleum Geo-Services and listed on the Oslo Stock Exchange. Teekay acquired majority ownership in the company in December 2006 and Petrojarl ASA subsequently became Teekay Petrojarl ASA.

In September 2017, Brookfield Business partners LP completed a $640 million equity investment in Teekay Offshore Partners L.P., acquiring 60% of the common units of Teekay Offshore. In April 2019, Teekay sold all remaining interests in Teekay Offshore to Brookfield for a further $100 million, signaling their exit from the Offshore space. Teekay Offshore has since been renamed to Altera Infrastructure.

== LNG shipping ==
In 2004, Teekay entered LNG shipping business with acquisition of Naviera Tapias, and publicly listed Teekay LNG Partners on the New York Stock Exchange in 2005. Teekay LNG Partners expanded business in 2005 after being awarded major long-term LNG contracts in Qatar and Indonesia.

A short time after October 2011, Teekay acquired Maersk's LNG carrier business of eight vessels in a deal worth $1.4 billion, as the latter exited the LNG space. Peter Evensen said that the Teekay LNG fleet at the time numbered to 45 vessels.

In July 2014, Teekay signed contracts for six Yamal Icebreaking LNG Carrier Newbuildings in a joint venture between Teekay LNG and China LNG (COSCO). The first ship, the Eduard Toll (IMO 9750696), was delivered in January 2018, and the final of the six vessels, the MV Yakov Gakkel (IMO 9750672), was delivered in December 2019. The venture owned the Eduard Toll, Rudolf Samoylovich, Nikolay Yevgenov and Vladimir Voronin tankers, all newly built for Yamal LNG.

In 2021, Teekay announced that Stonepeak Infrastructure Partners would acquire Teekay LNG in a $6.2 billion transaction. The transaction closed on January 13, 2022 and the company was rebranded as Seapeak.

== Current operations ==
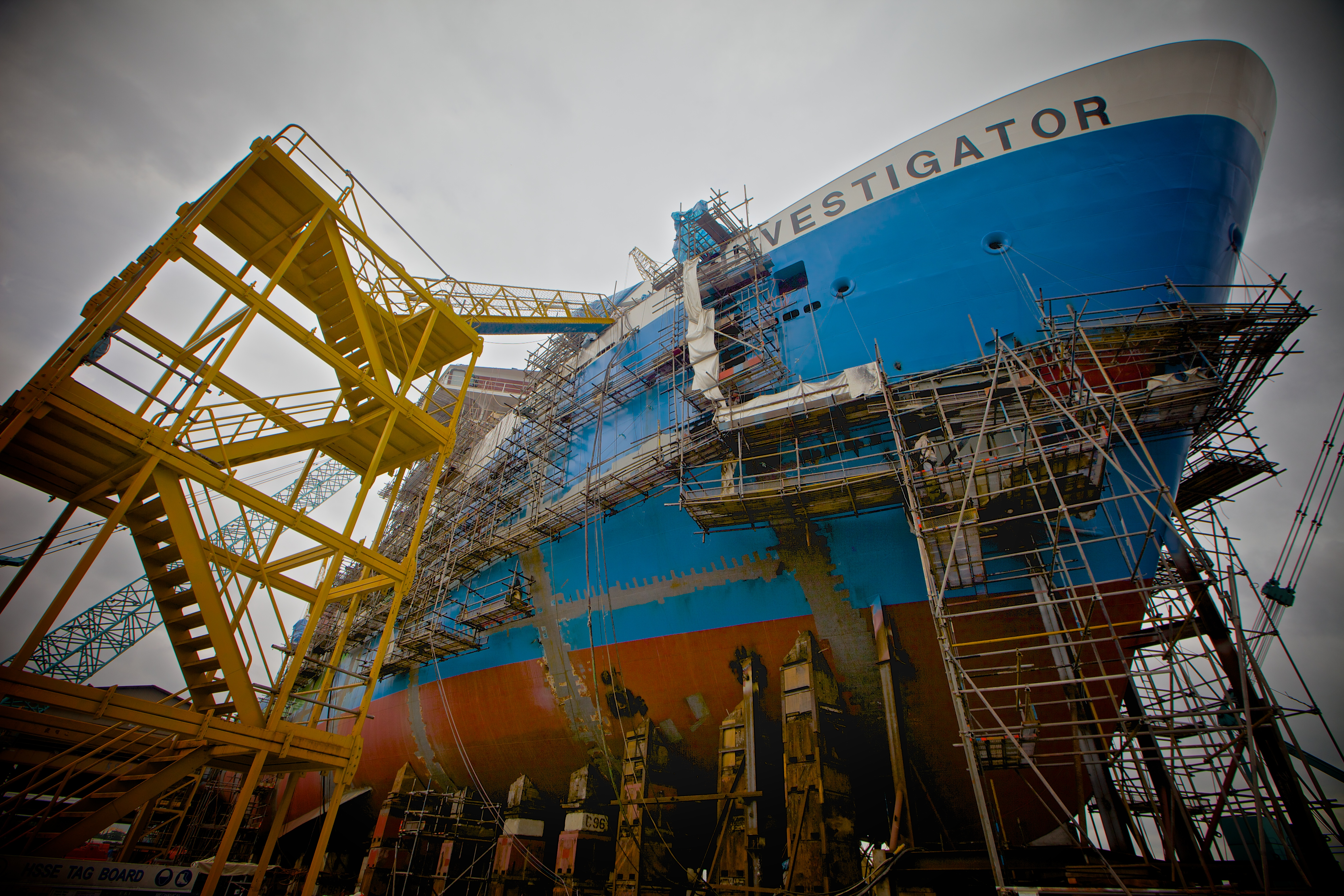
The 93.9 metre Investigator has room onboard for up to 40 scientists, who can stay at sea for up to 60 days and cover up to 10,000 nautical miles in a single voyage. The contract to design, build and commission the vessel was awarded to Teekay Holdings Australia, which partnered with Sembawang Shipyard Pte Ltd in Singapore because of its track record and strong commitment to new technologies and innovation.

Teekay currently operates a fleet of conventional tankers, under head offices in Canada, London, Manila, Mumbai, Bermuda and Singapore, along with a marine services arm based in Australia.

=== Leadership ===
As of March 2022, the company's leadership consisted of Kenneth Hvid (the President and Group CEO) and Kevin Mackay (President and CEO - Teekay Tankers Ltd.).

== Gallery ==
House flag of Teekay

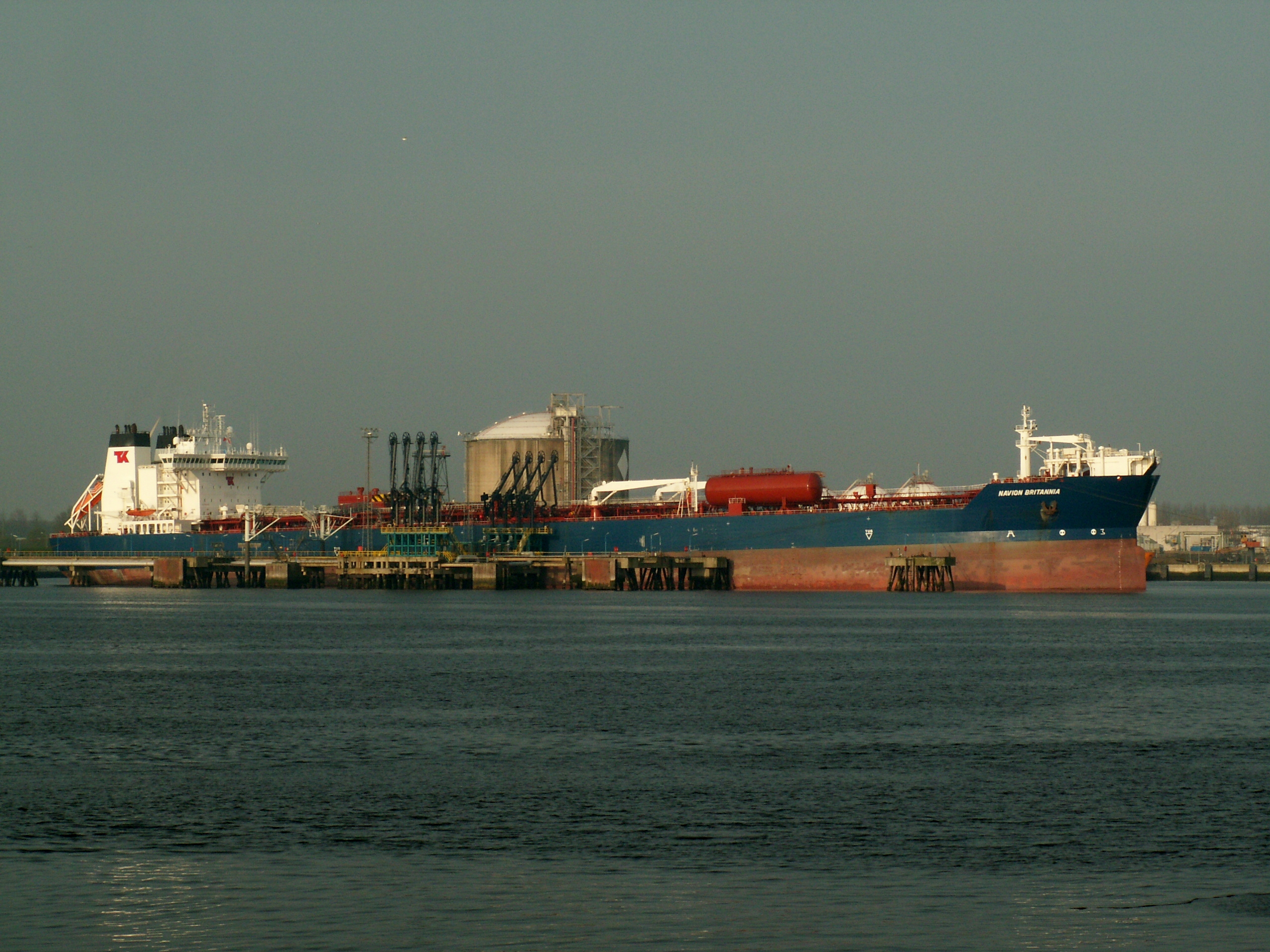
Teekay acquired the MV Navion Britannia when it bought operator Navion from Statoil

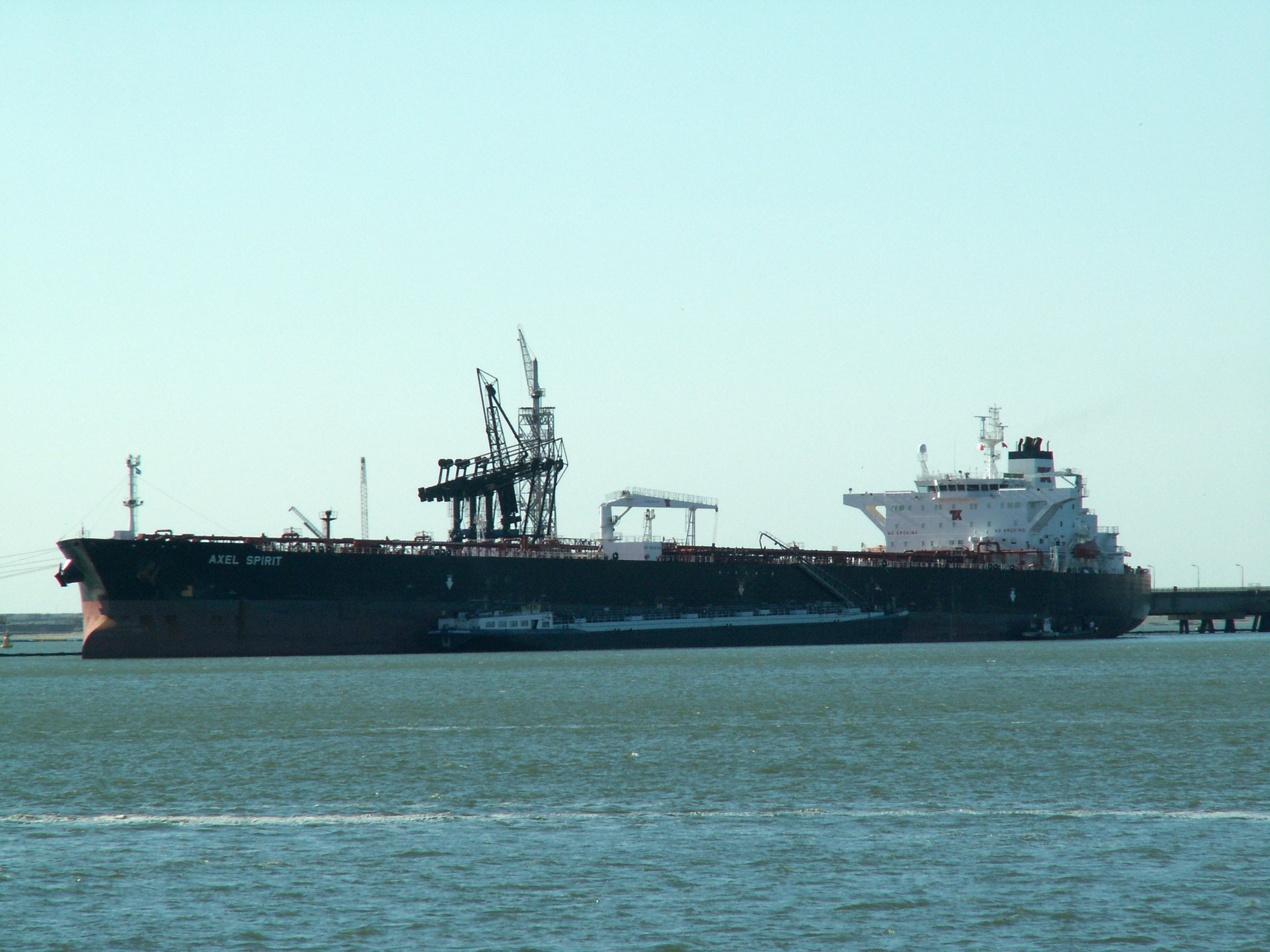
MV Axel Spirit in April 2006 at the Port of Rotterdam

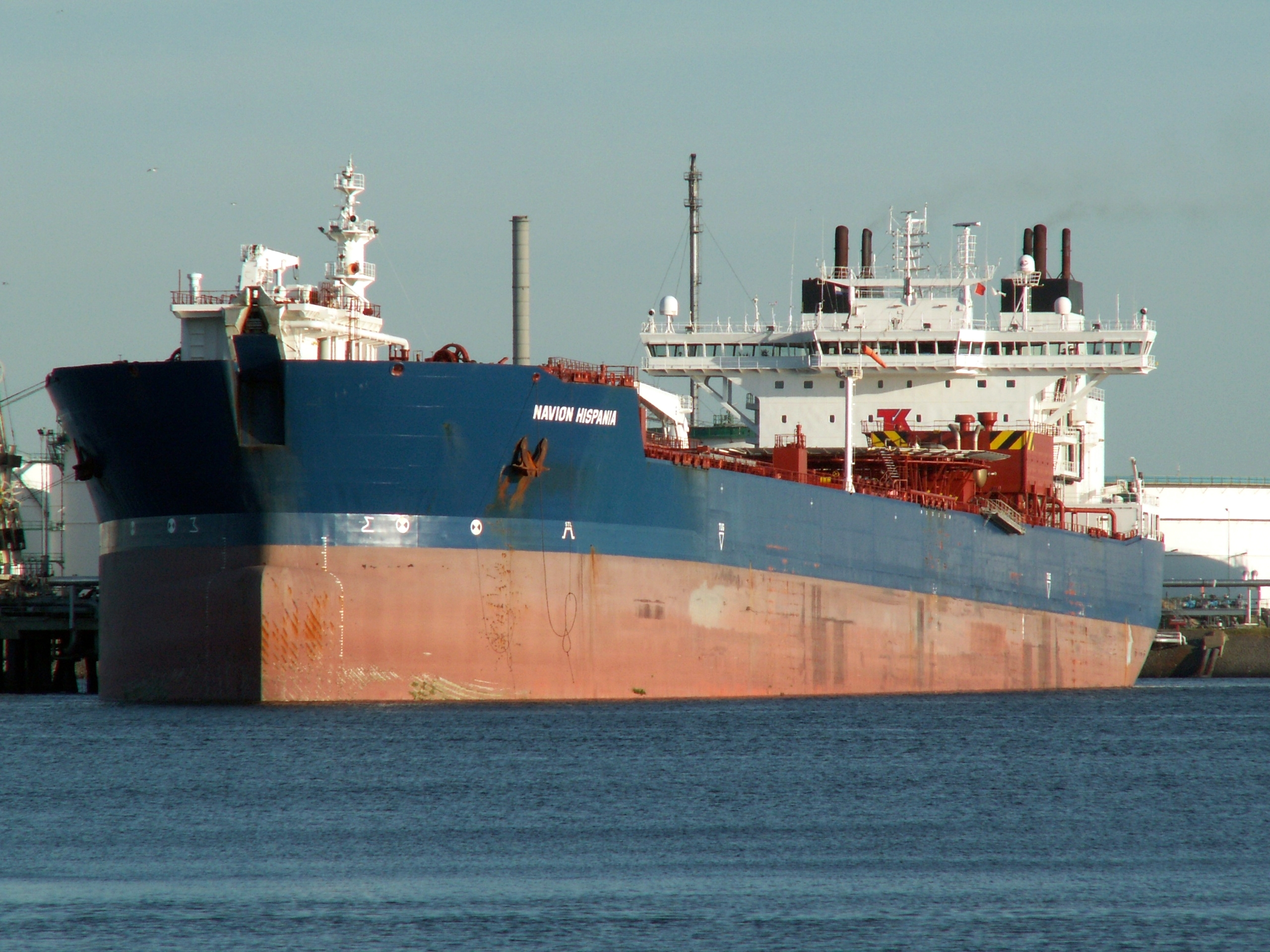
MV Navion Hispania in July 2006 at Rotterdam

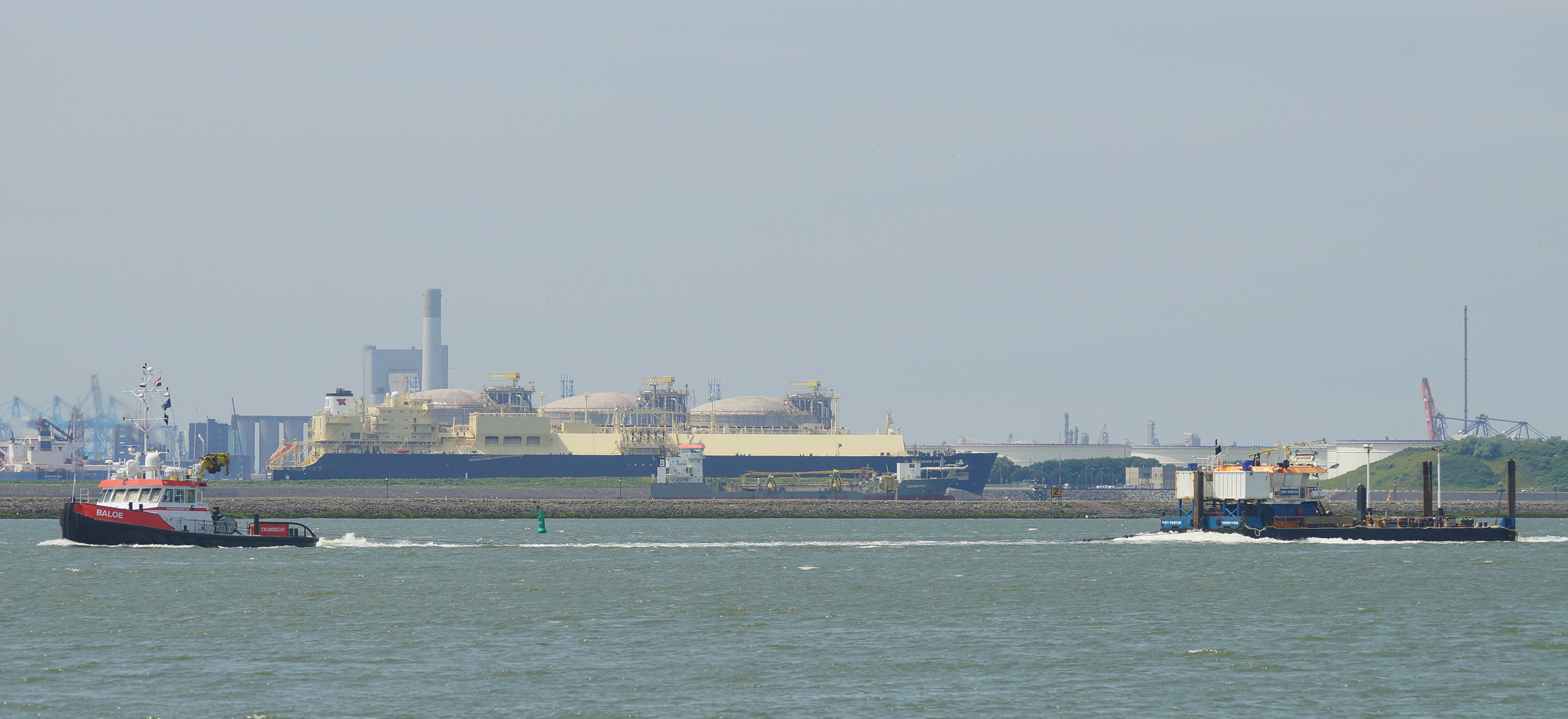
The MV Meridian Spirit is seen in the distance, beyond the breakwater in this photo from July 2016 in Rotterdam

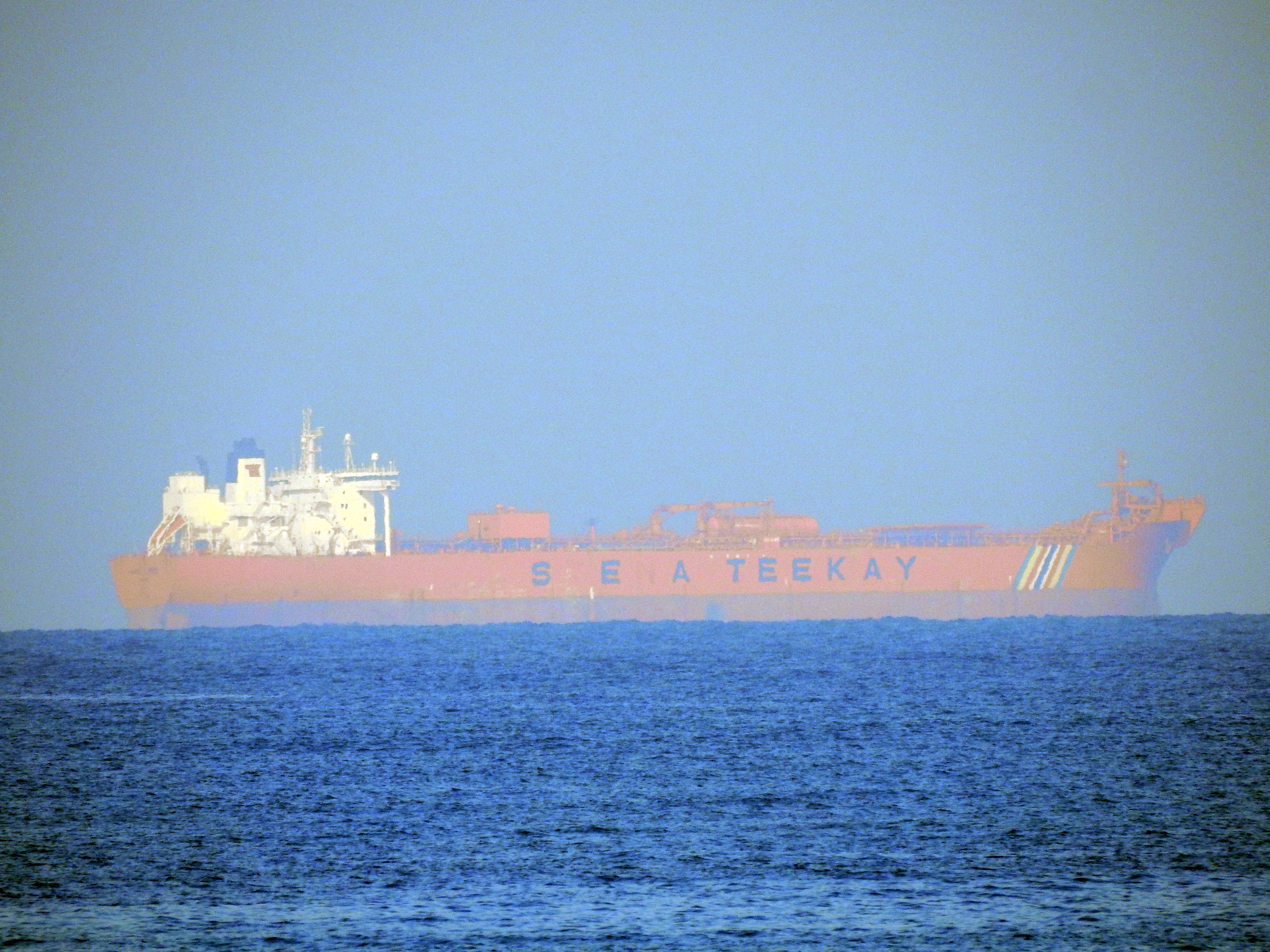
The MV SriLanka Independence on 4 February 2019 offshore Colombo harbour
