= Tobruk (disambiguation) =

Tobruk is a town and a seaport in Libya.

Tobruk, Tubruk or Tubruq may also refer to:

== Military ==
- Siege of Tobruk, a prolonged campaign in World War II
- Axis capture of Tobruk, the capture of Tobruk by German and Italian forces over the period 17–21 June 1942 in World War II
- HMAS Tobruk, two ships of the Royal Australian Navy
- SS Tobruk, a Polish transport ship during World War II
- Tobruk, a type of concrete fortification used during World War II; See Defensive fighting position

== Arts and entertainment ==
- Tobruk (1967 film), a 1967 movie
- Tobruk (2008 film), a 2008 movie
- Tobruk, a book by Peter Rabe, based upon the 1967 movie
- Tobruk (board game), a 1975 wargame
- Tobruk (video game), a 1987 video game
- Tobruk (band), a British Rock Band

== Other uses ==
- Tobruk District, a former name of Butnan District, Libya
- Beitar Nes Tubruk F.C., Israeli football club and academy
