= International Fleet Review 2013 =

2013 naval review in Sydney, Australia

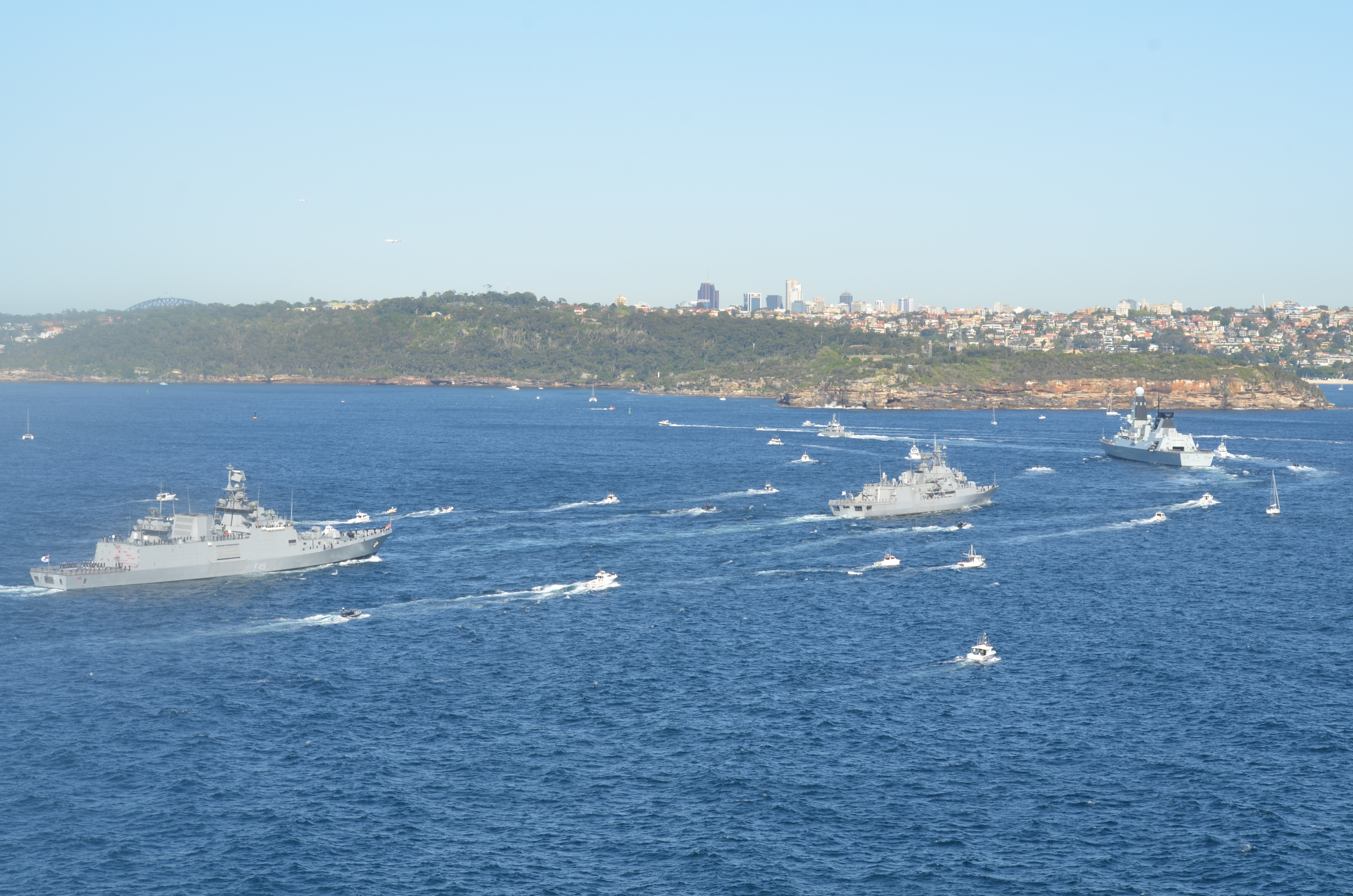
- Indian, New Zealand and British warships entering Sydney Harbour for the International Fleet Review
- Date: October 3–11, 2013
- Duration: 9 Days
- Venue: Sydney Harbour
- Location: Sydney, Australia
- Also known as: IFR 2013
- Type: Military
- Organised by: Royal Australian Navy
- Participants: more than 50 Countries

The International Fleet Review 2013 was a review that took place on the week 3 to 11 October 2013, as part of the celebrations to commemorate the 100th anniversary of the entry of the first Royal Australian Navy fleet in Sydney Harbour, on 4 October 1913.

== Background ==
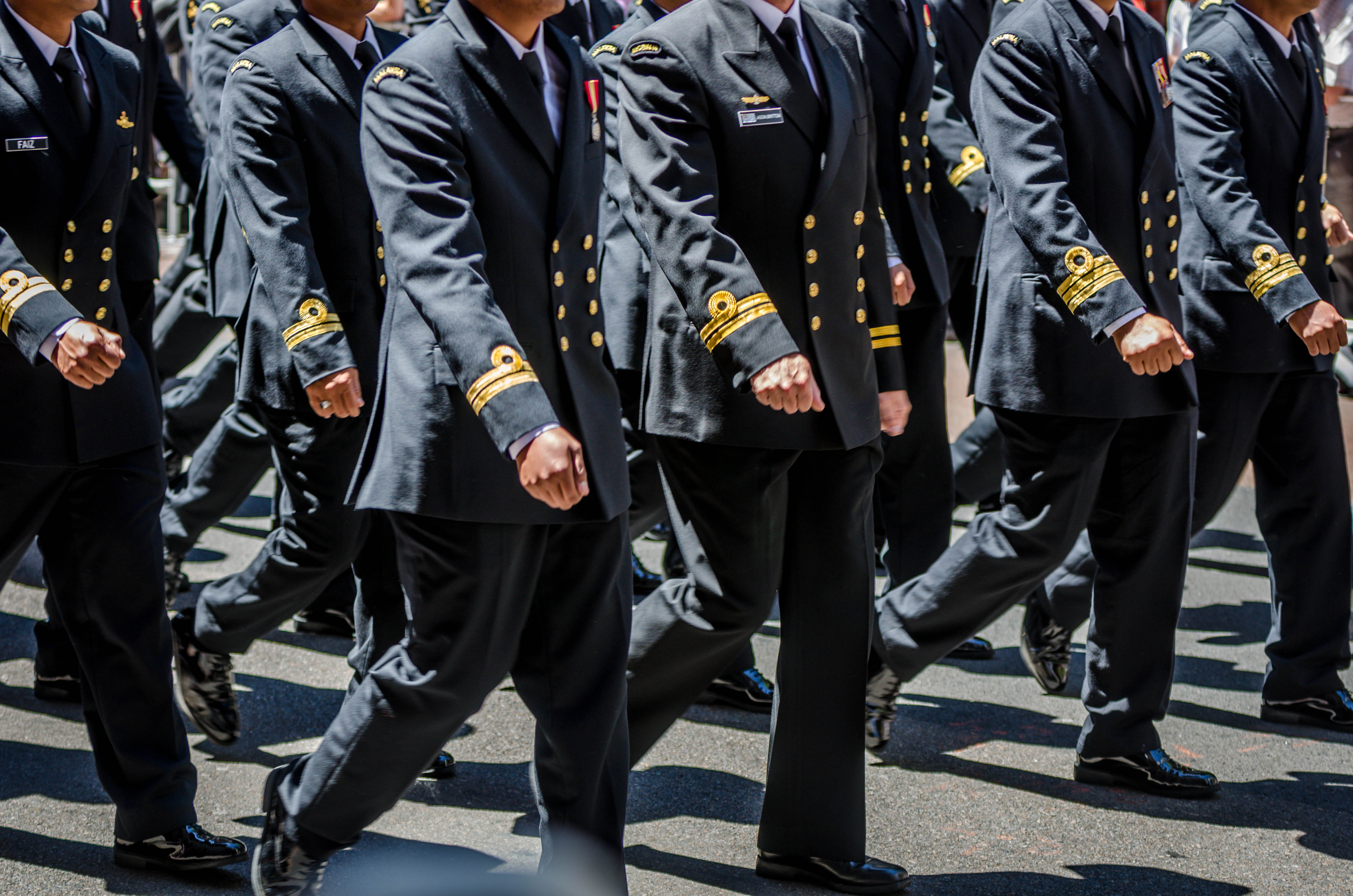

In 2011 the RAN invited over 50 nations to send a ship to participate in a fleet review to commemorate the centenary of the first entry in Sydney of the Australian Fleet. This event was considered a milestone in Australia's maturity as a nation. The event was planned in partnership with the New South Wales and the City of Sydney governments. The IFR was expected to have similar scale and public impact to that experienced during previous reviews held in Sydney, as the RAN 75th Anniversary (1986) and the Bicentennial Naval Salute (1988). It was also confirmed that Prince Harry would attend the IFR as part of his first official visit to Australia.

Some 40 warships and 16 tall ships were expected to participate in the review, of which a line of seven RAN ships symbolised the 1913 entry itself. The ships were greeted by the Governor-General of Australia, Quentin Bryce, from Bradleys Head on 4 October. She and Prince Harry officially reviewed the fleet on 5 October as part of the Ceremonial Fleet Review.

The tall ships departed on 10 October, and the warships did so on 11 October to take part in the naval exercise Triton Centenary.

=== Associated events ===
In addition to the fleet review itself, the following events were scheduled to coincide with the IFR:

- IFR in Jervis Bay
- RAN Sea Power Conference 2013
- Pacific 2013 International Maritime Congress and Exposition
- Exercise TRITON CENTENARY
- Sydney to Hobart Tall Ships Regatta 2013 (organised by Sail Training International)
- International Fleet Review 2013 Art Competition

=== 1913 Fleet entry ===
On 21 June 1913, the battlecruiser HMAS Australia was commissioned at Portsmouth, and sailed towards Australia on 25 July 1913 accompanied by the also new light cruiser HMAS Sydney. On 2 October 1913 both ships arrived at Jervis Bay, New South Wales, where the rest of the Australian fleet joined them: the protected cruiser Encounter, the light cruiser Melbourne, and the destroyers Parramatta, Warrego, and Yarra.

On 4 October 1913 the ships, led by Australia, entered Sydney Harbour in an event that was witnessed by thousands of sightseers around the harbour, amidst nationalistic euphoria.

== Events planned for the week ==
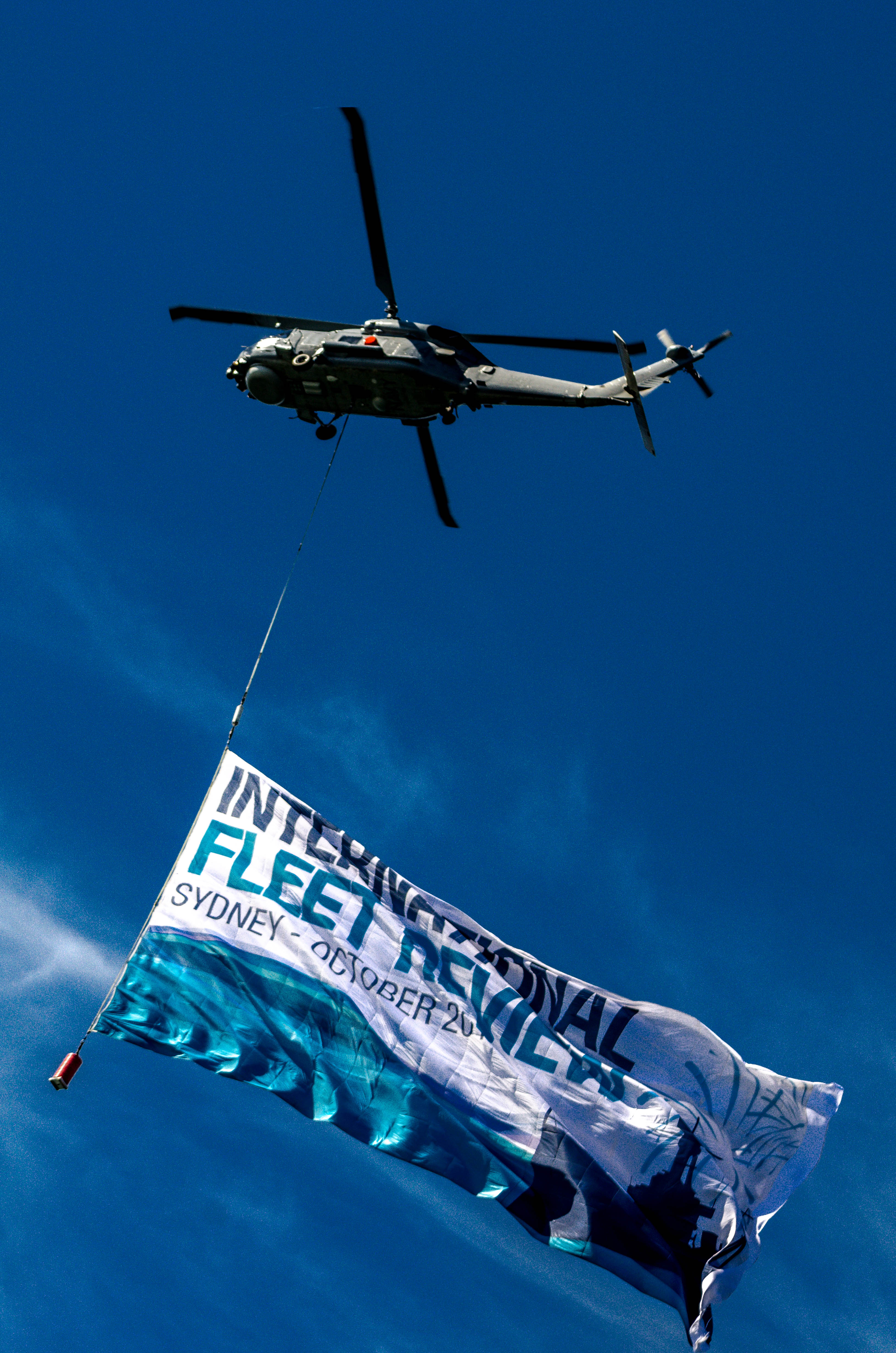

A summary of the main events planned for the IFR 2013 week is listed below.

- 3 October: Tall ships enter Sydney Harbour
- 4 October: Warships enter Sydney Harbour
- 4 October: RAN Helicopter Display Team & RAAF Roulettes
- 4 October: Ceremonial Fleet Entry & 21-gun Salute
- 5 October: Ceremonial Fleet Review by the Governor-General of Australia
- 5 October: Formation flypast and Air Displays by civil and military helicopters and aircraft
- 5 October: IFR Fireworks and Lightshow Spectacular
- 6 & 7 October: Tall ships & Warships Open Days
- 7 to 9 October: Sea Power Conference 2013 & Pacific 2013 International Maritime Exposition
- 8 October: Freedom of Entry to Mosman CBD & Parramatta CBD
- 9 October: Combined Navies Parade, Sydney CBD
- 10 October: Tall ships depart Sydney Harbour
- 10 October: International Fleet Review Sailing Regatta
- 11 October: Warships depart Sydney Harbour

== Participants ==
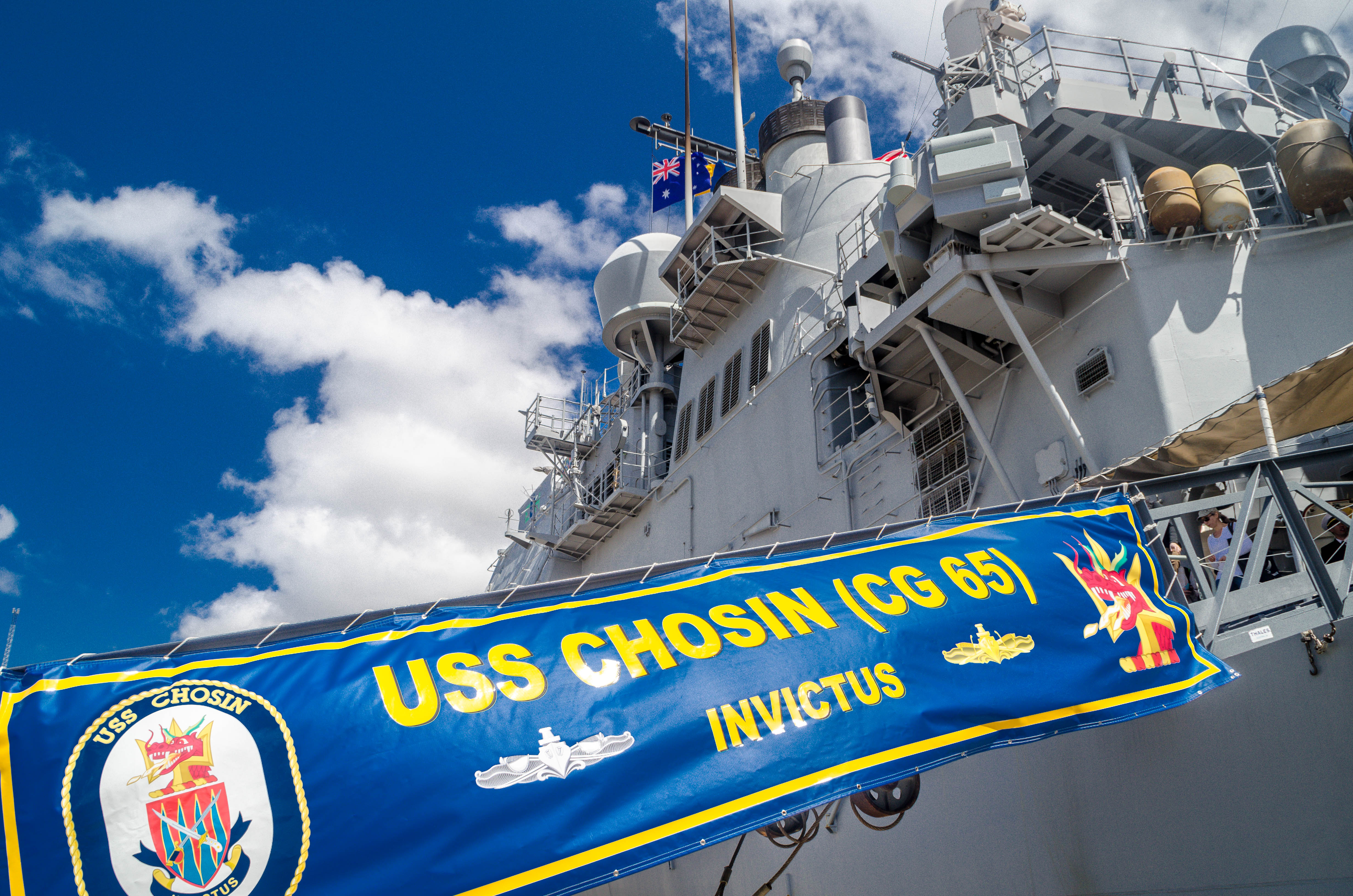

As of 2 October 2013, the following participants from about 20 nations were confirmed.

=== Warships ===
- Royal Australian Navy: 19 ships
- Other Navies: 18 ships from 17 navies

=== Tall ships ===
- Australia: 10 ships
- Other countries: 6 ships, from 4 countries

=== Civilian ships ===
- Australia: 3 ships, including the steam launch Lady Hopetoun which participated in the event of 1913.

=== Military aircraft ===
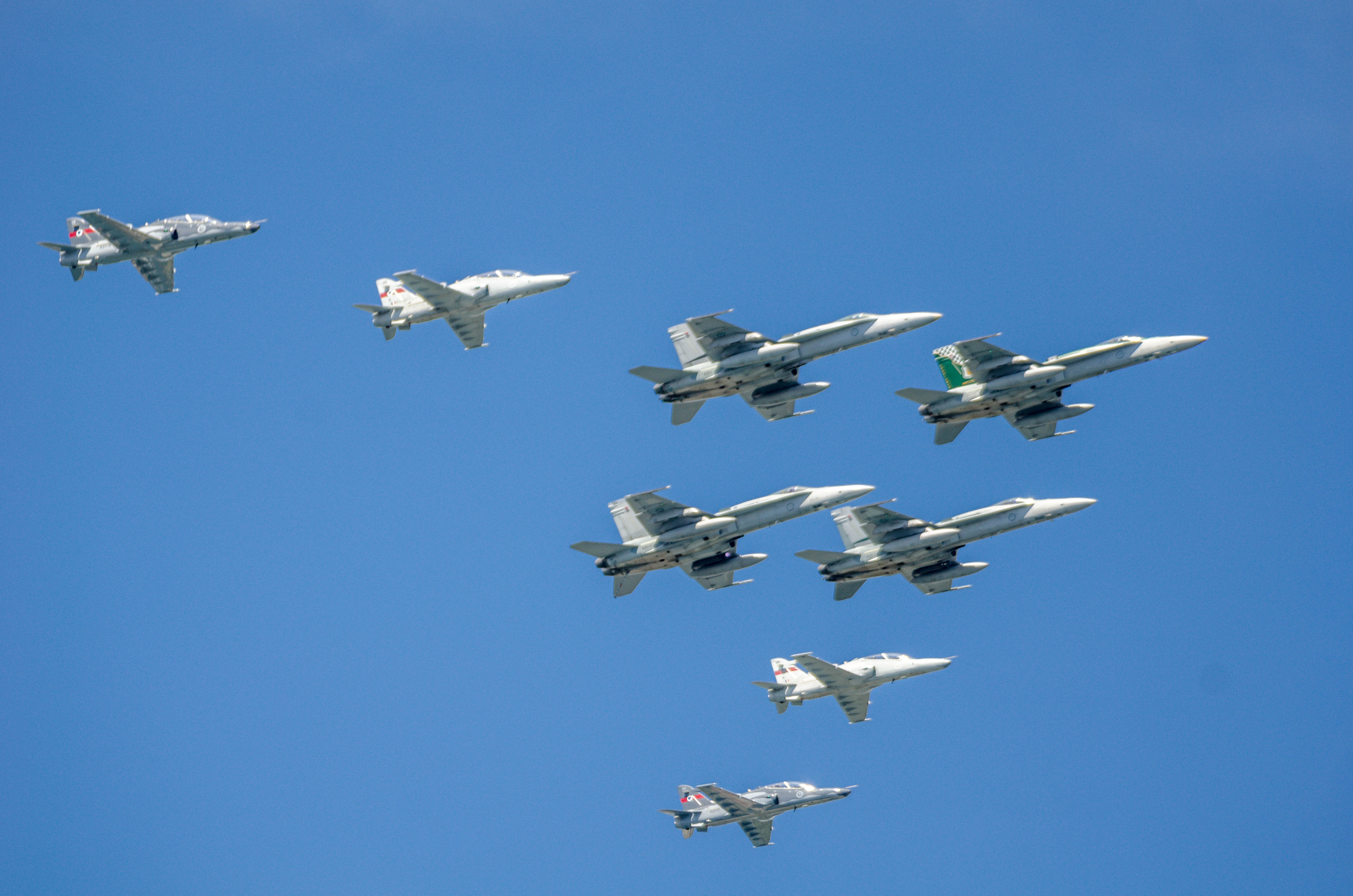

- Royal Australian Navy: helicopters from 5 squadrons and the Heritage Flight
- Royal Australian Air Force: helicopters from 5 squadrons and the Roulettes display team
- Australian Army: helicopters from 1 squadron
- Other Air Forces: naval aircraft and helicopters from 4 nations

=== Civil aircraft ===
- Aircraft and helicopters from 7 emergency services
- Vintage aircraft from the Historic Aircraft Restoration Society
- Privately owned aircraft

=== Bands ===
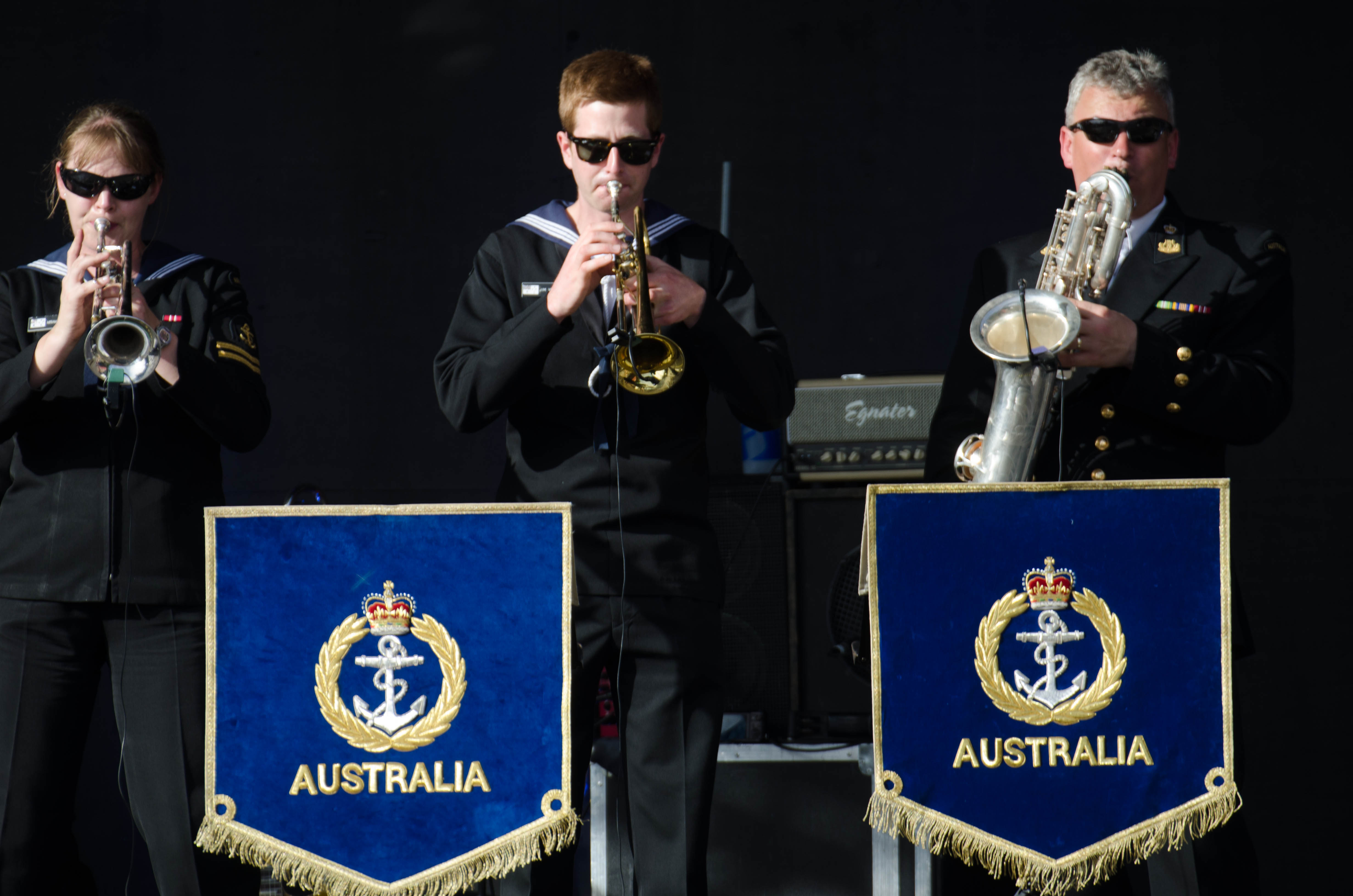

Participating naval bands included:

- Royal Australian Navy Band
- RAN's first Indigenous Performance Group
- Royal New Zealand Navy Band
- Her Majesty's Royal Marines Band
- Australian Navy Cadet Band, TS Hobart

== Gallery ==
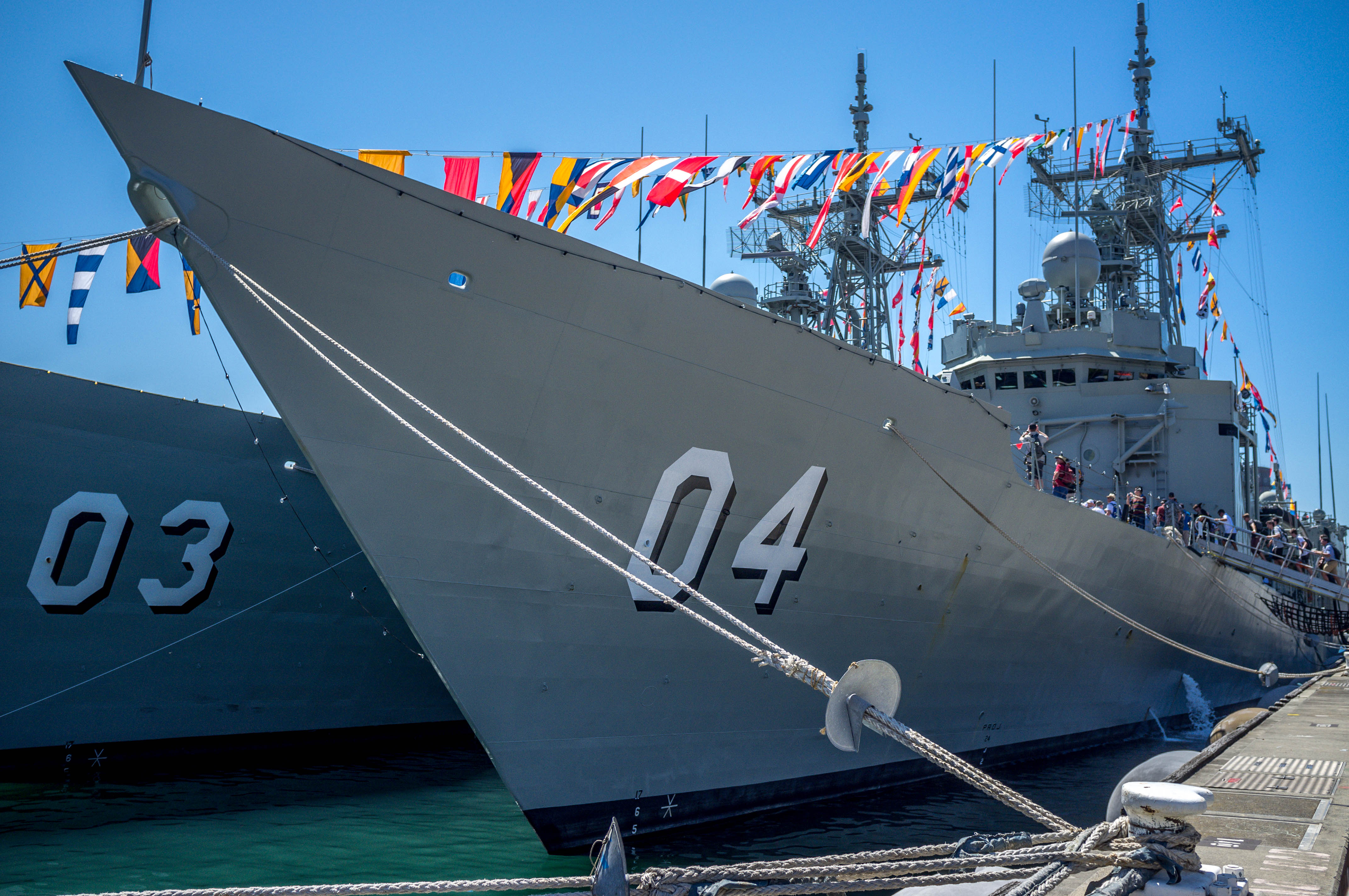
HMAS Darwin and Sydney Open Day

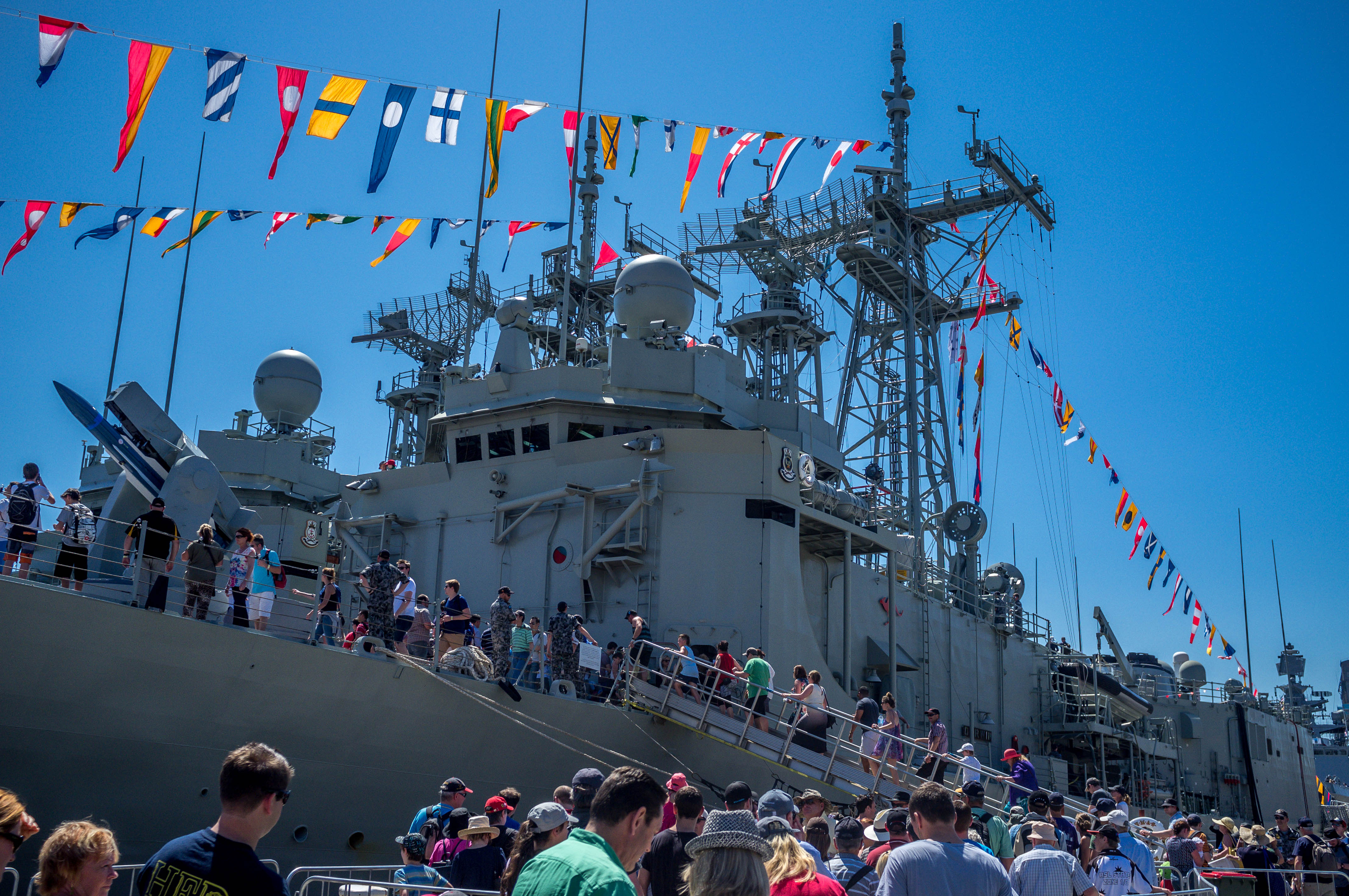
HMAS Darwin and Sydney Open Day

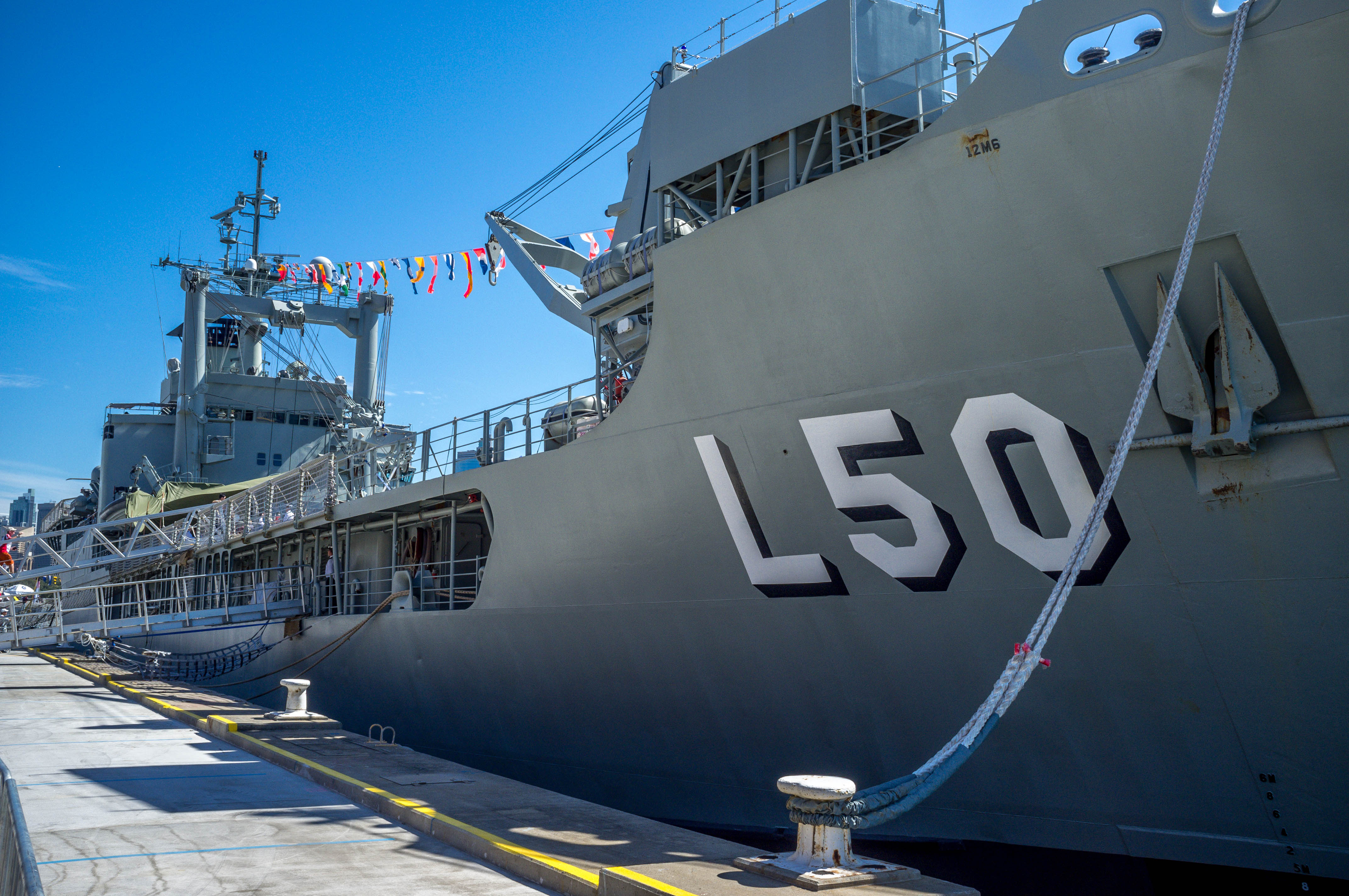
HMAS Tobruk Open Day

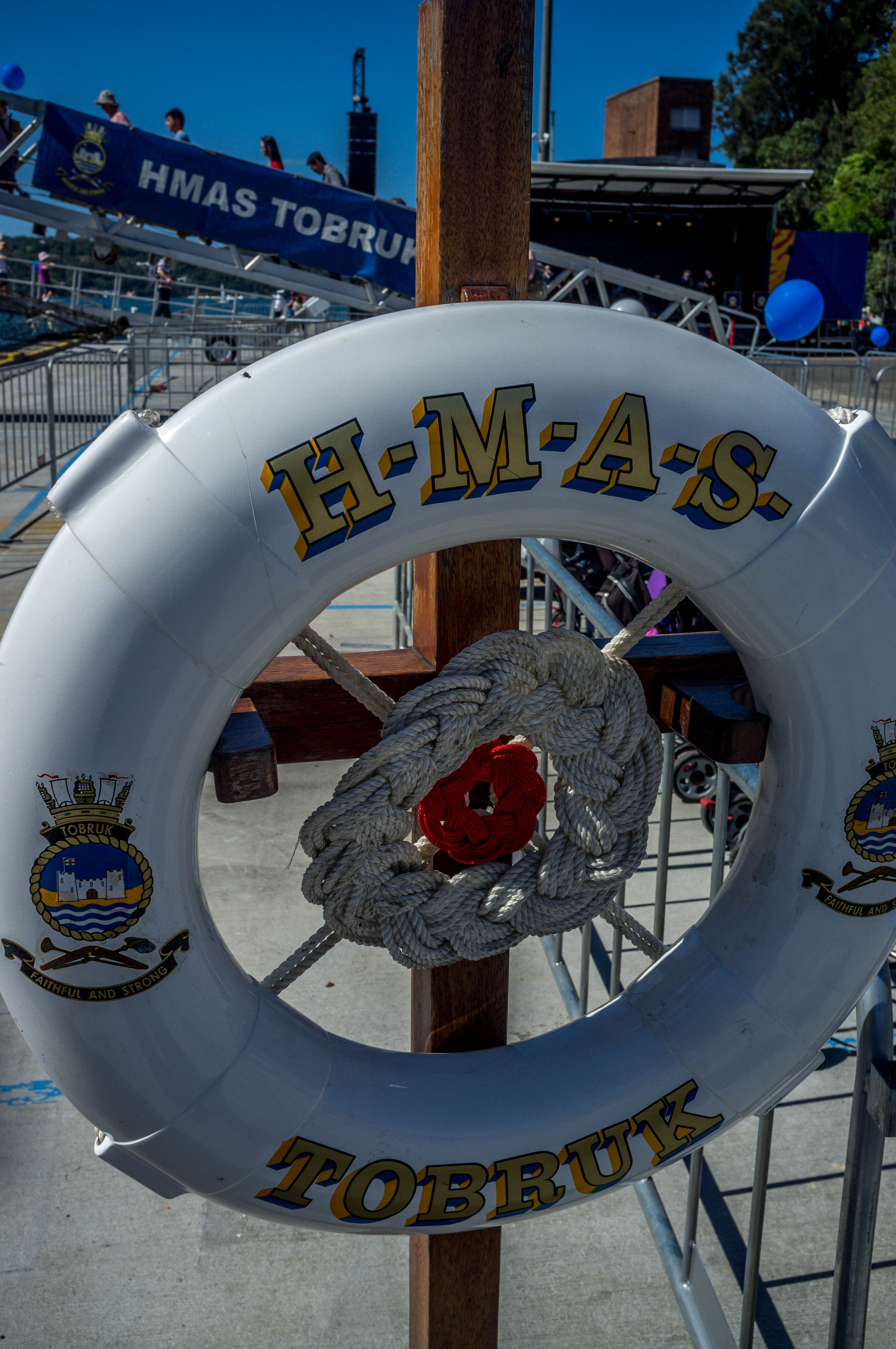
HMAS Tobruk Open Day

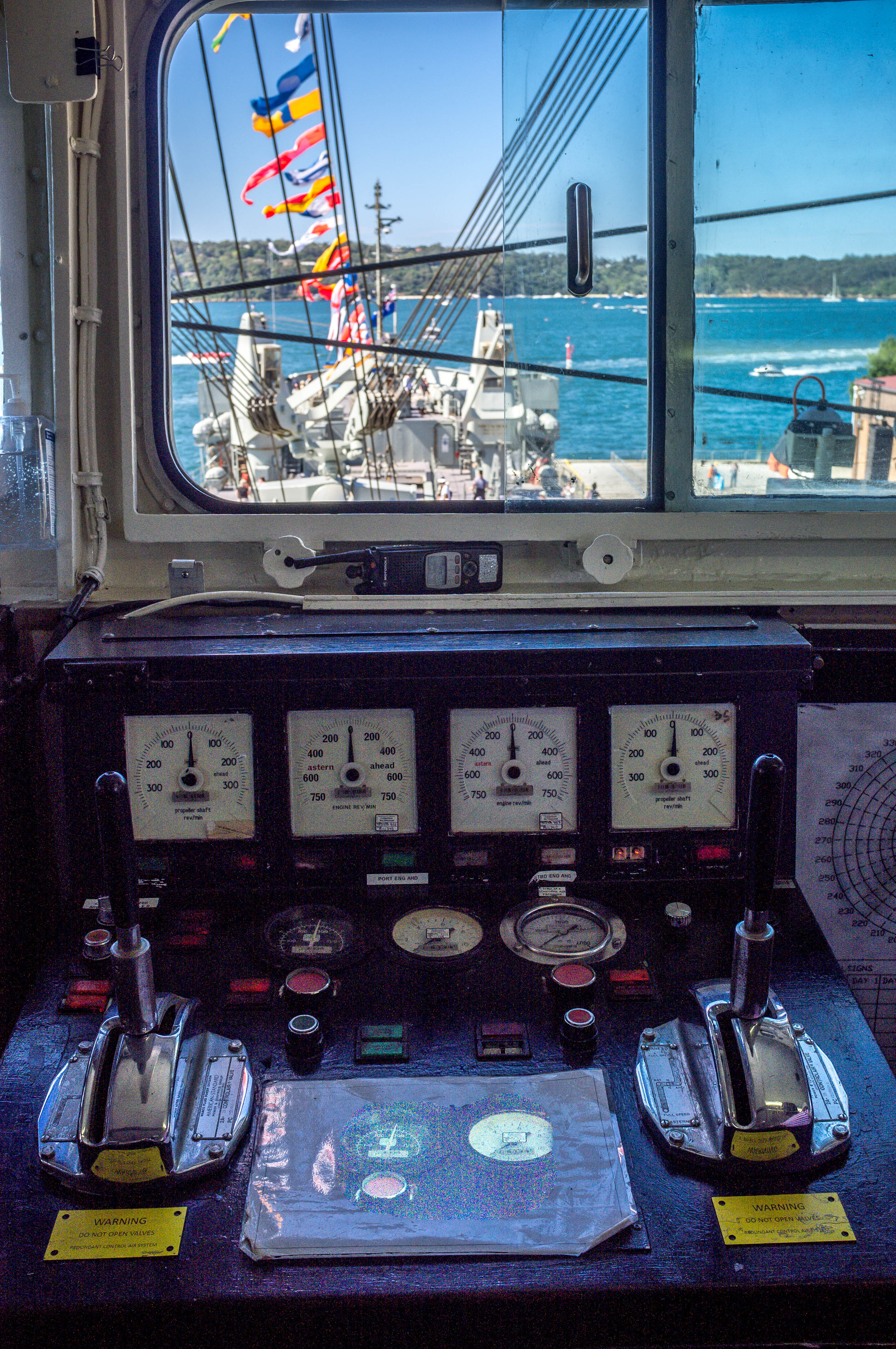
HMAS Tobruk HMAS Tobruk Bridge

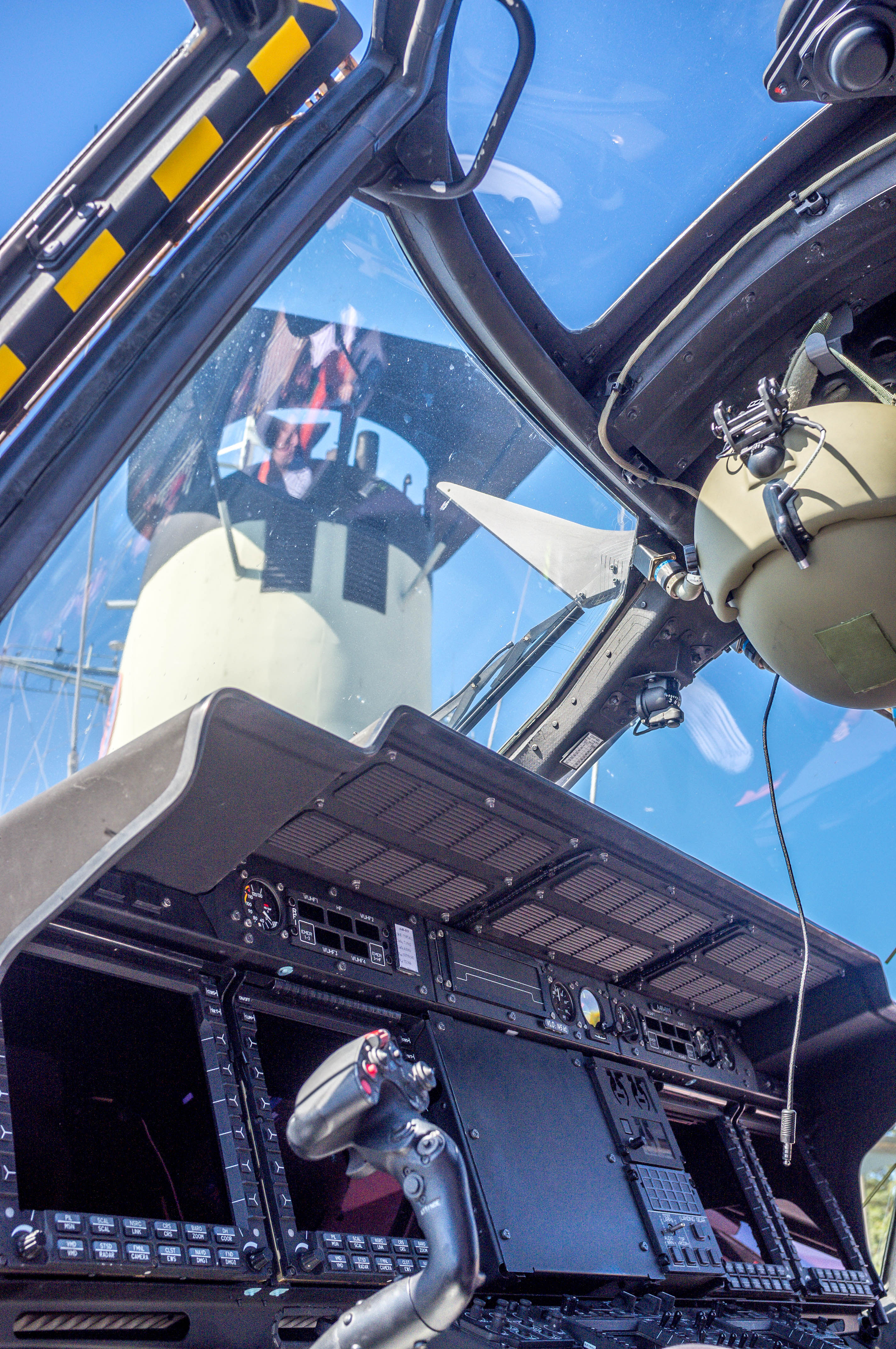
NH90 on HMAS Tobruk rear flight deck

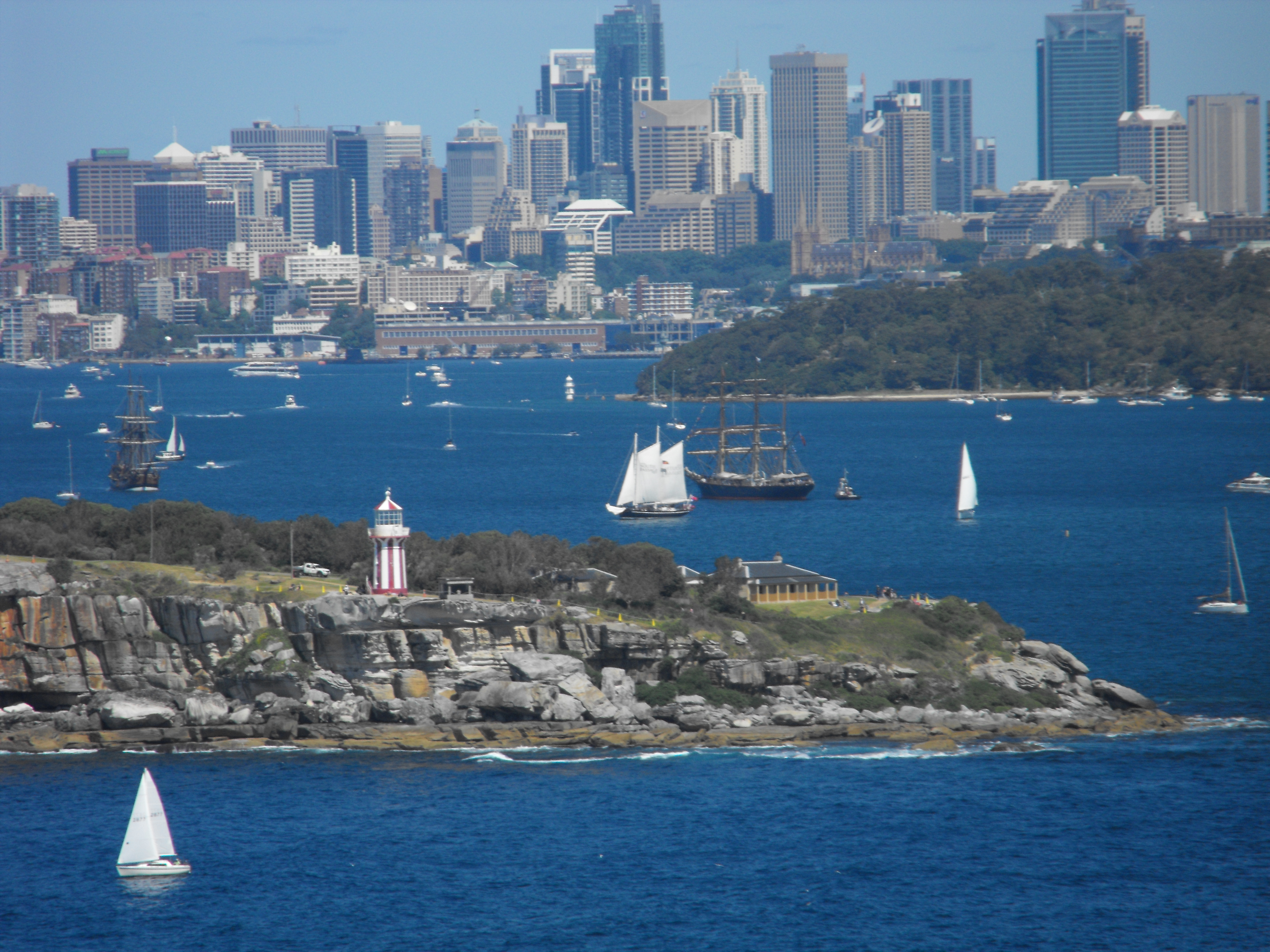
Tall ships sailing near South Head on the second day of the review

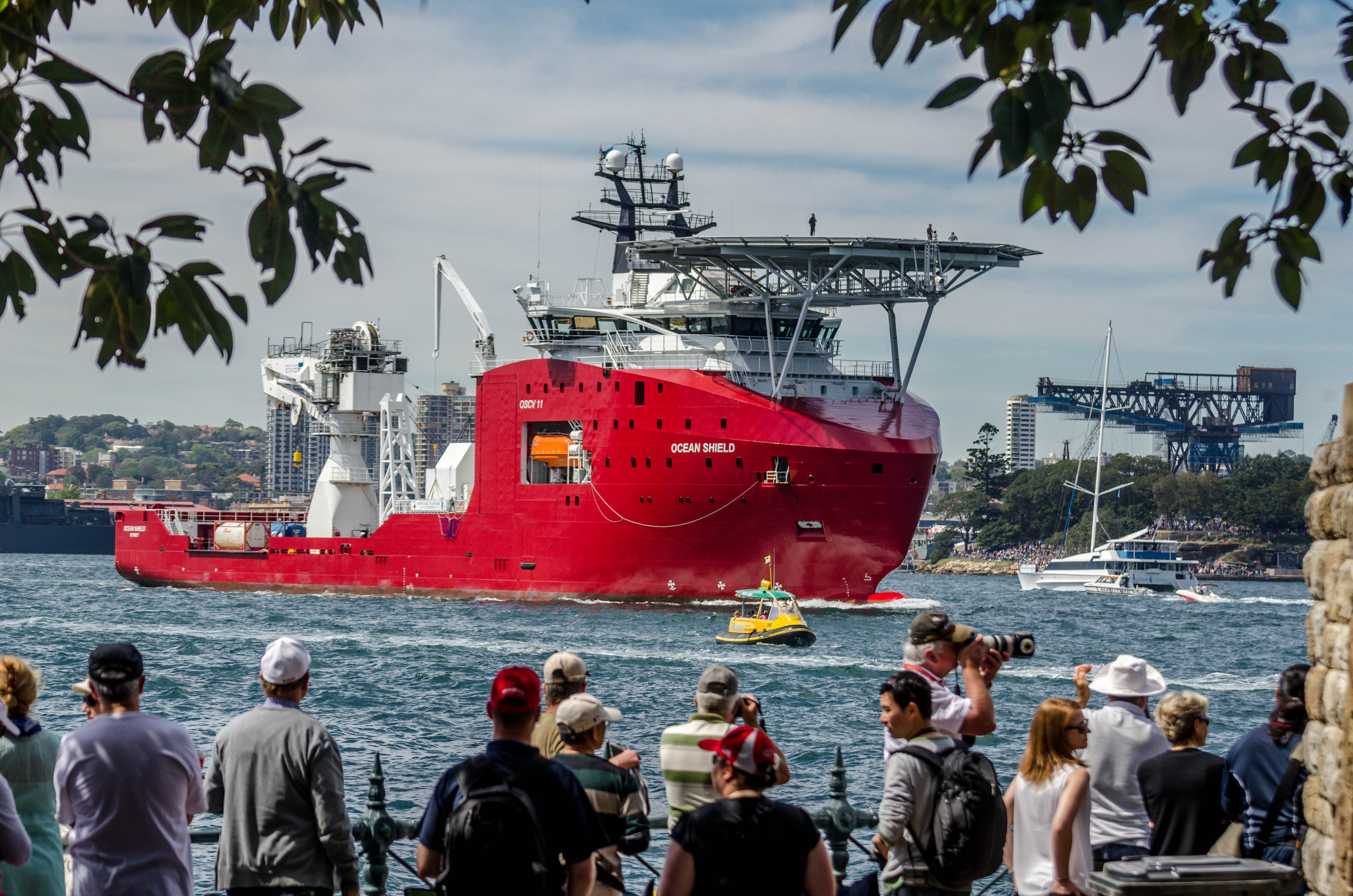
ADV Ocean Shield during International Fleet Review 2013

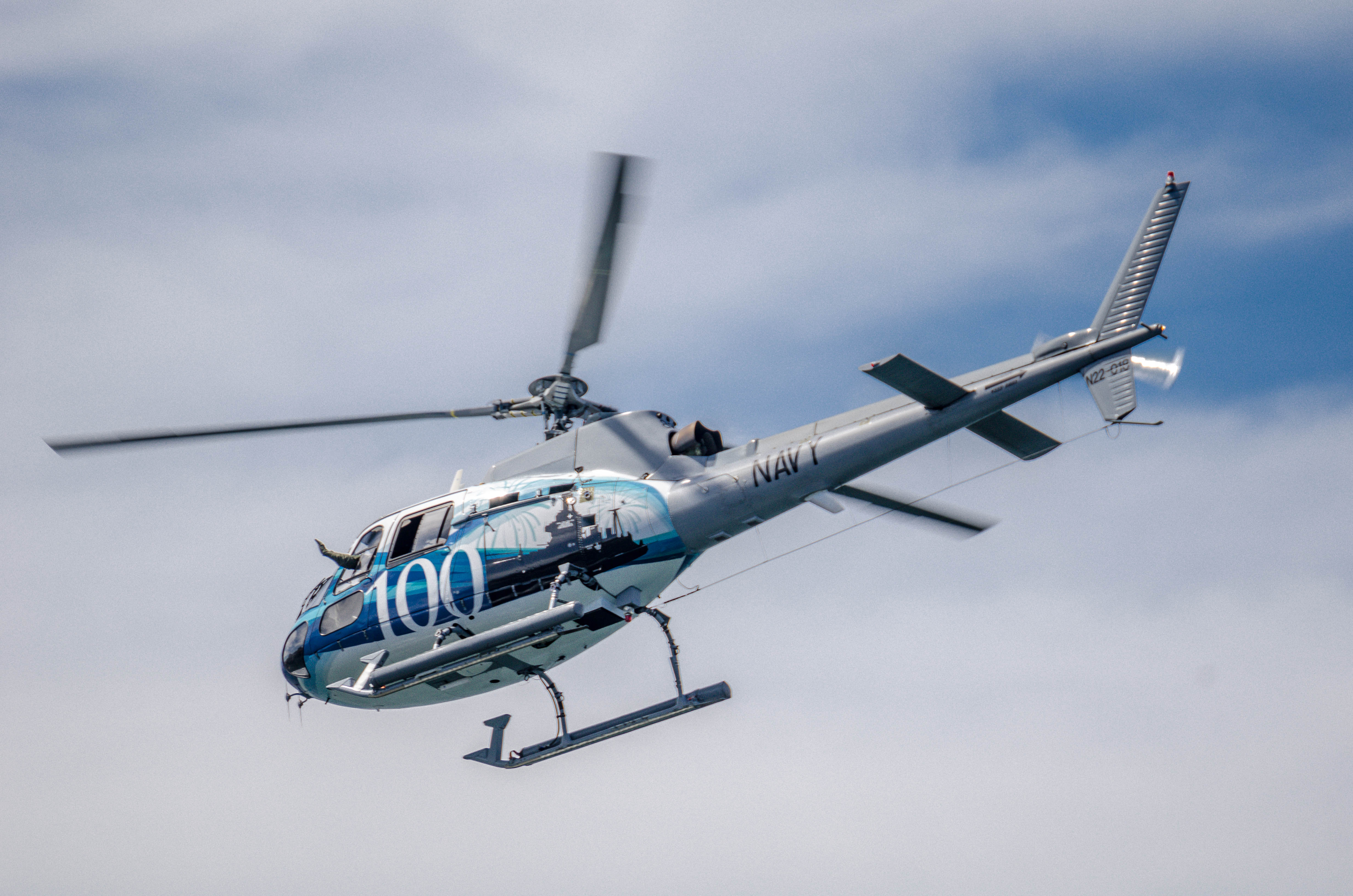
RAN Centenary Squirrel helicopter

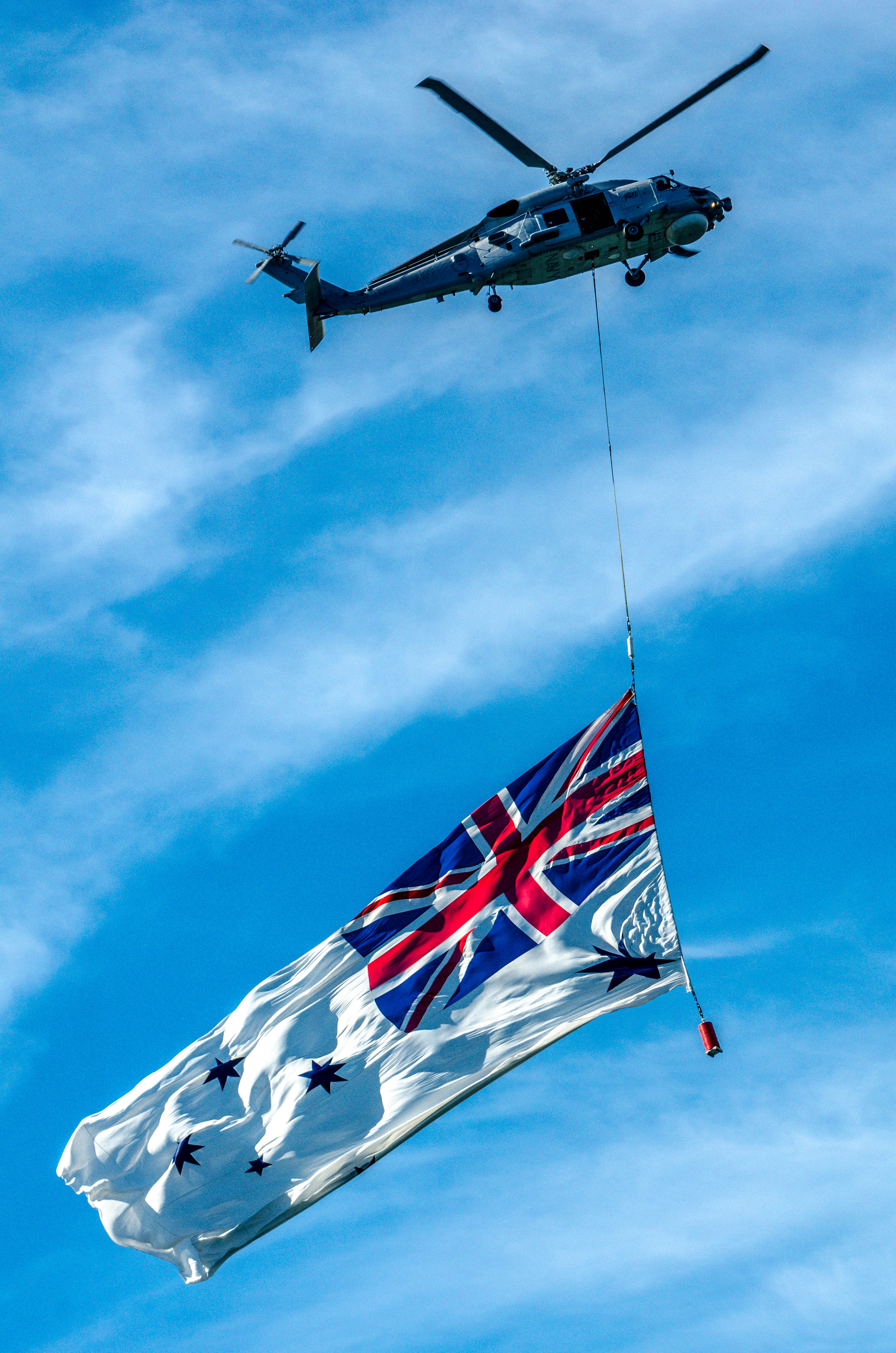
Royal Australian Navy Ensign

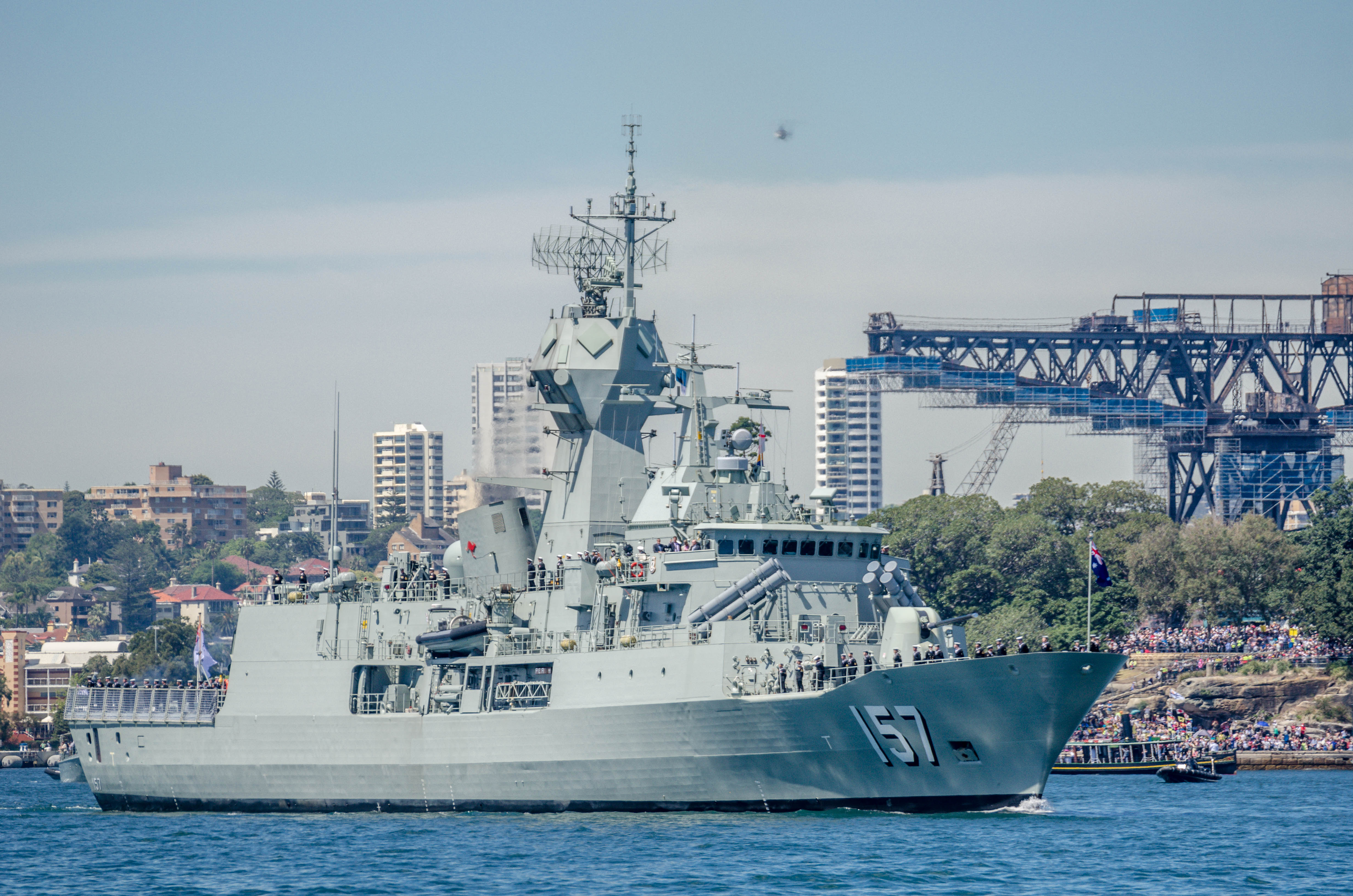
HMAS Perth (FFH 157)

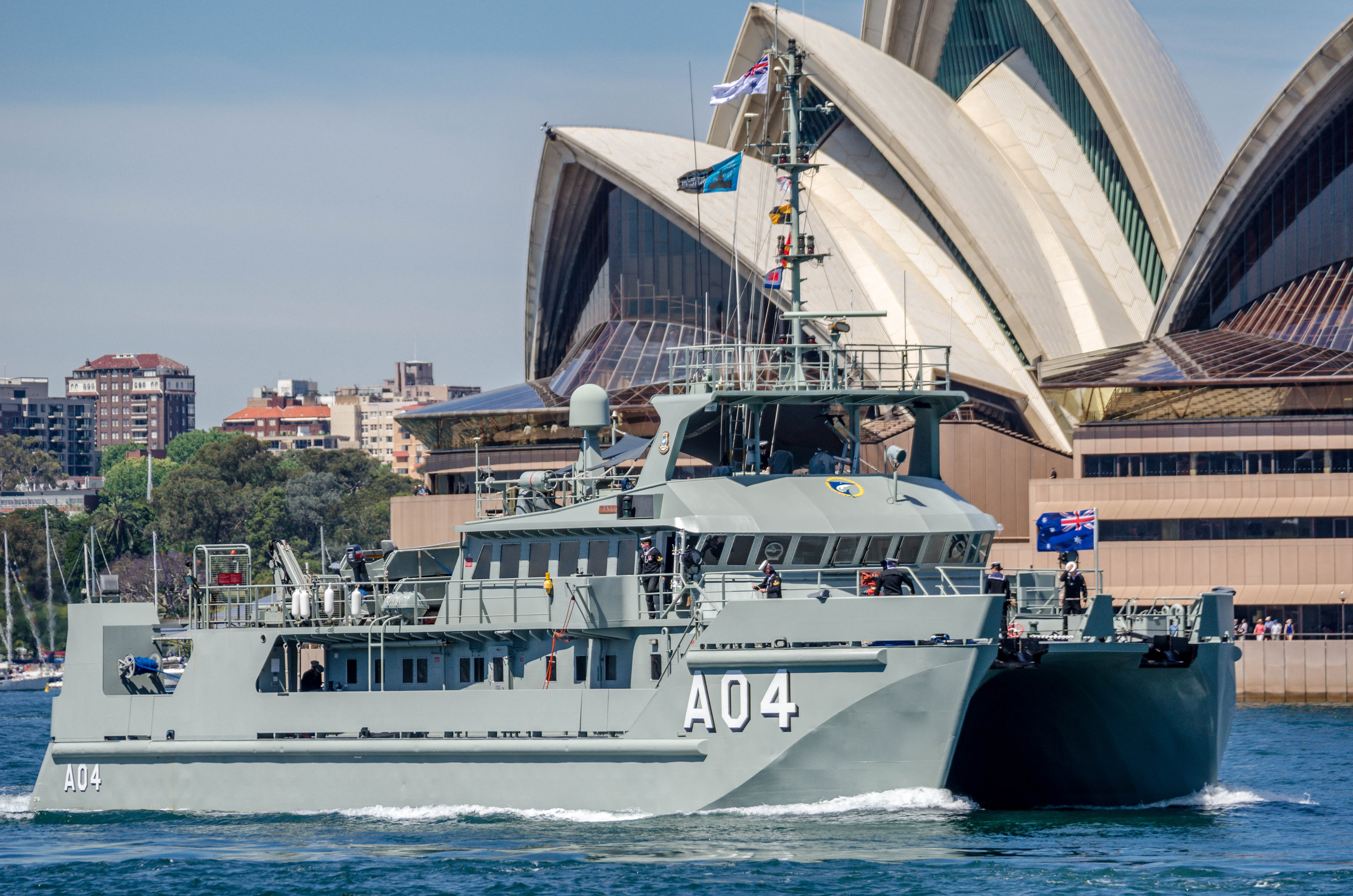
HMAS Benalla (A 04)

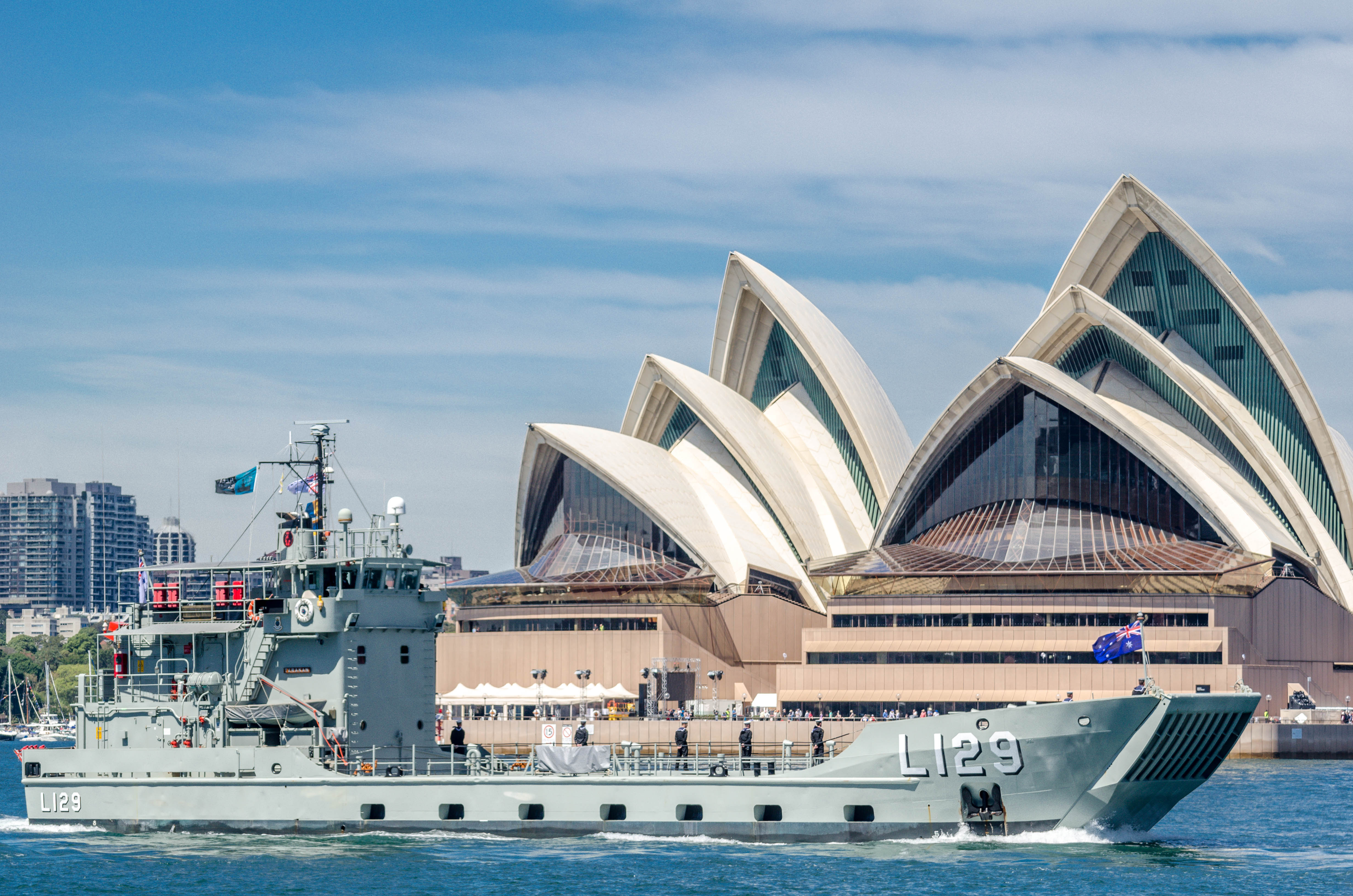
HMAS Tarakan (L 129)

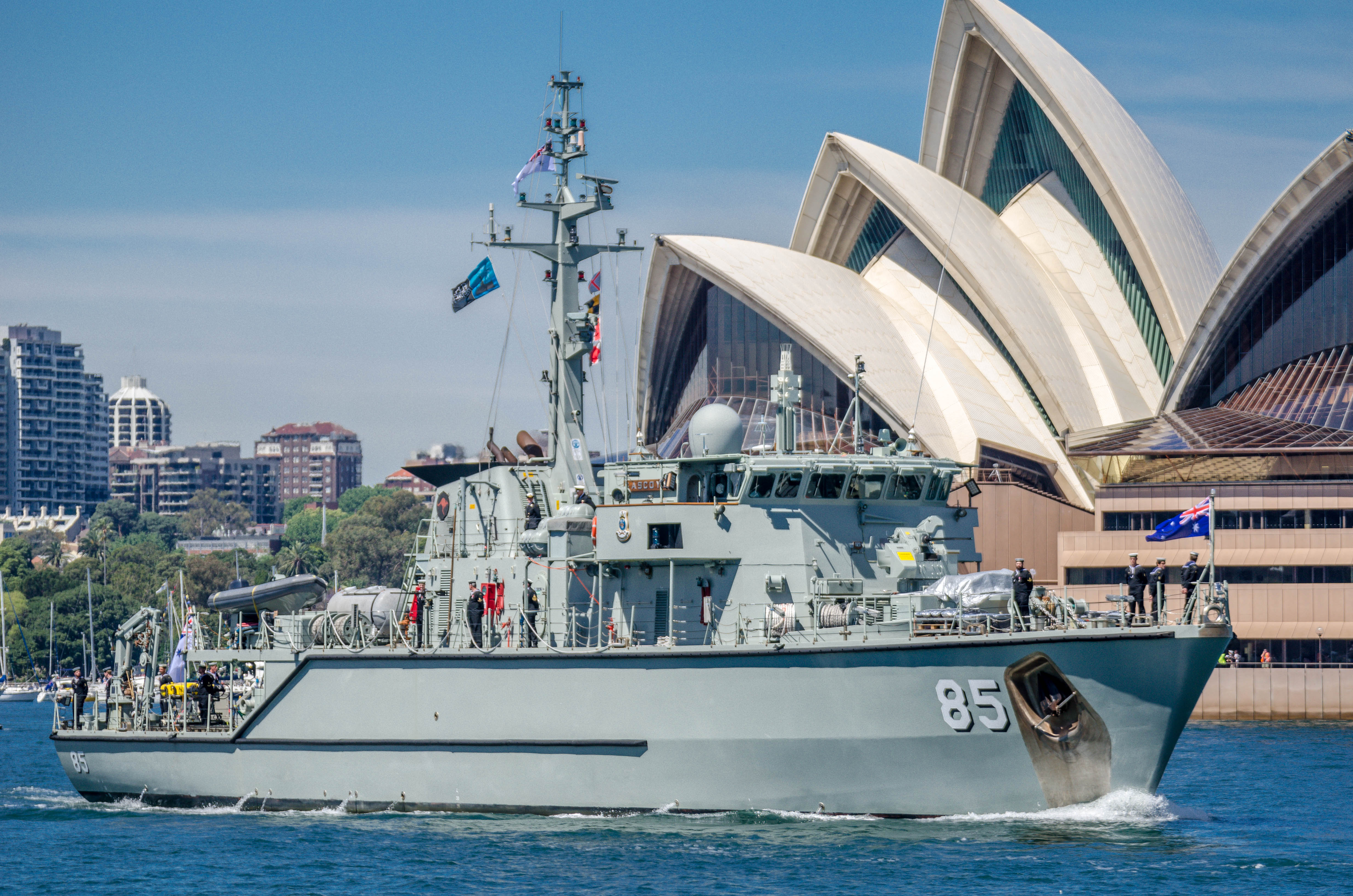
HMAS Gascoyne (M 85)

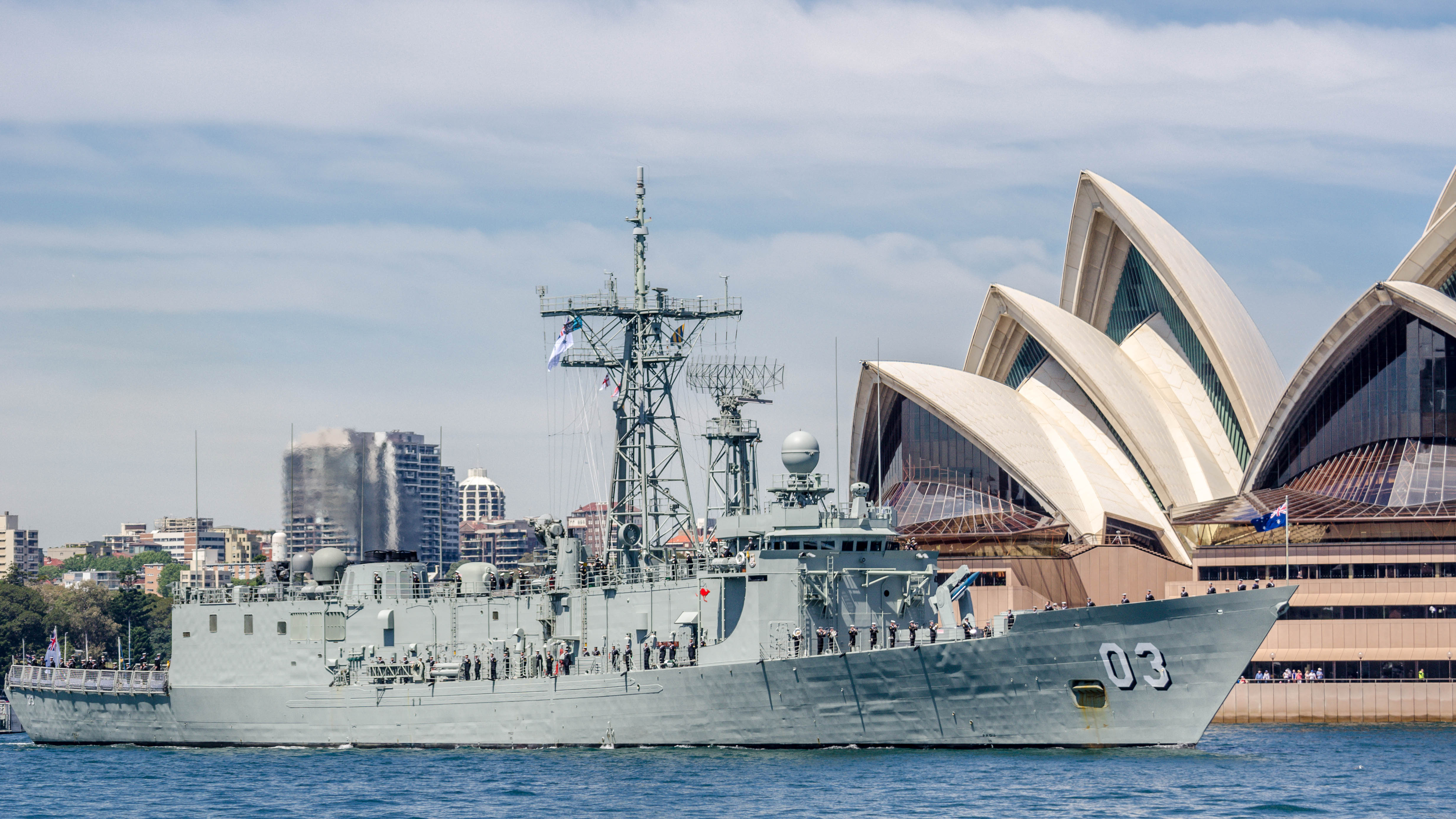
HMAS Sydney (FFG 03)

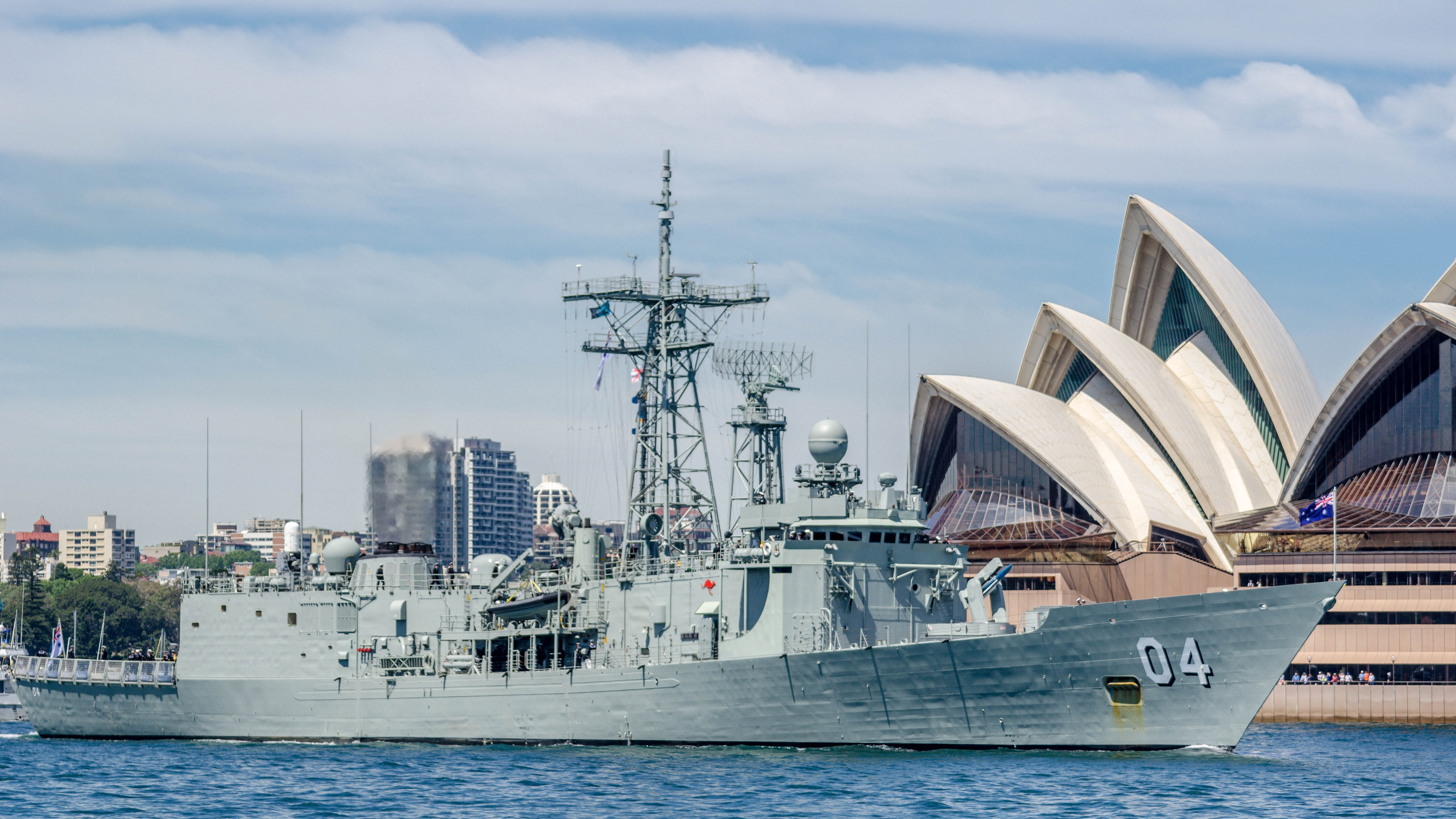
HMAS Darwin (FFG 04)

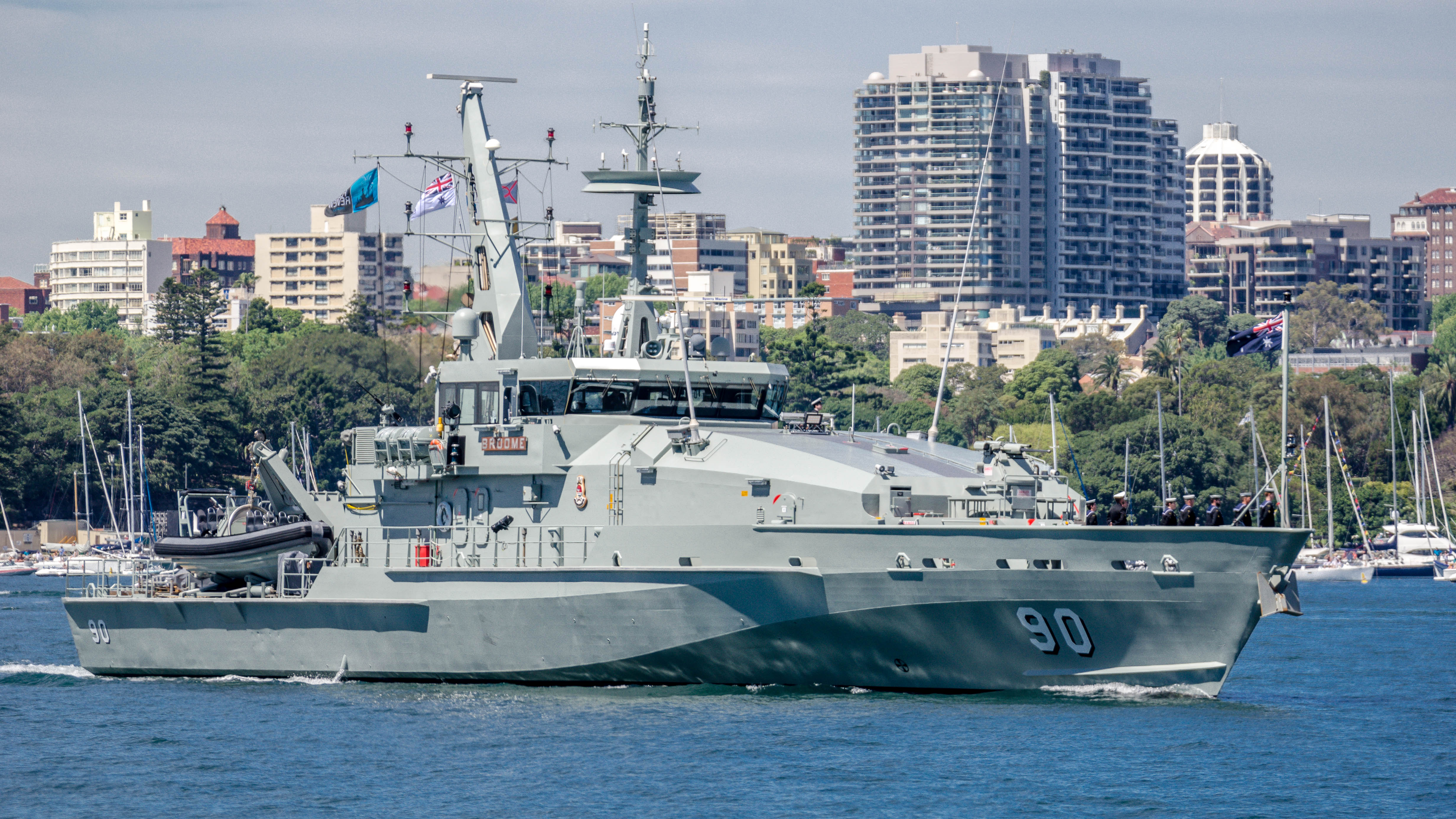
HMAS Broome (ACPB 90)

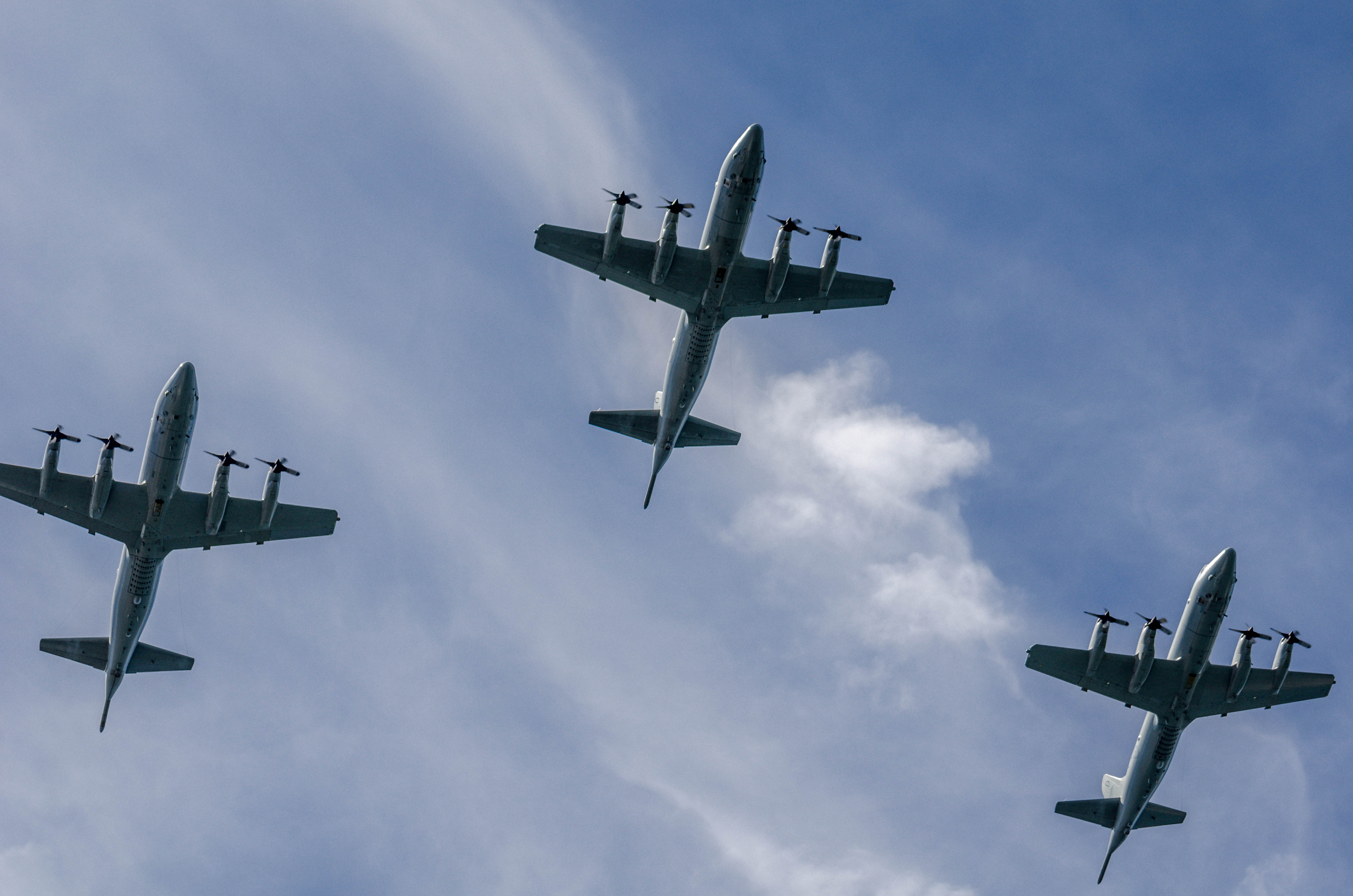
Lockheed AP-3C Orions

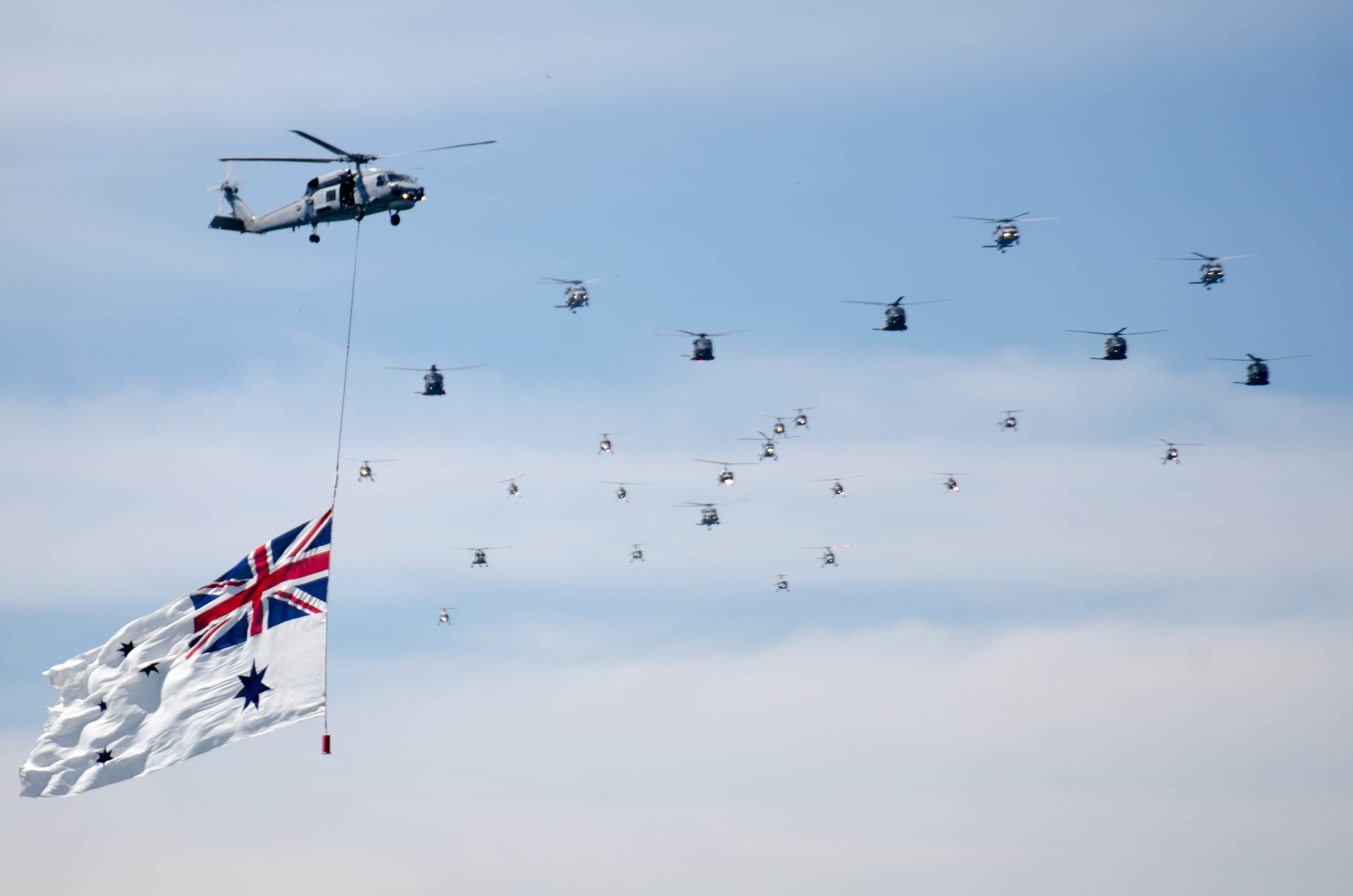
Navy Helicopter Fly Past

== See also ==
- Fleet review (Commonwealth realms)
- International Fleet Review 2016
- International Fleet Review 2026
