= HMAS Tobruk (L 50) =

Modified Round Table-class Landing Ship Heavy of the Royal Australian Navy

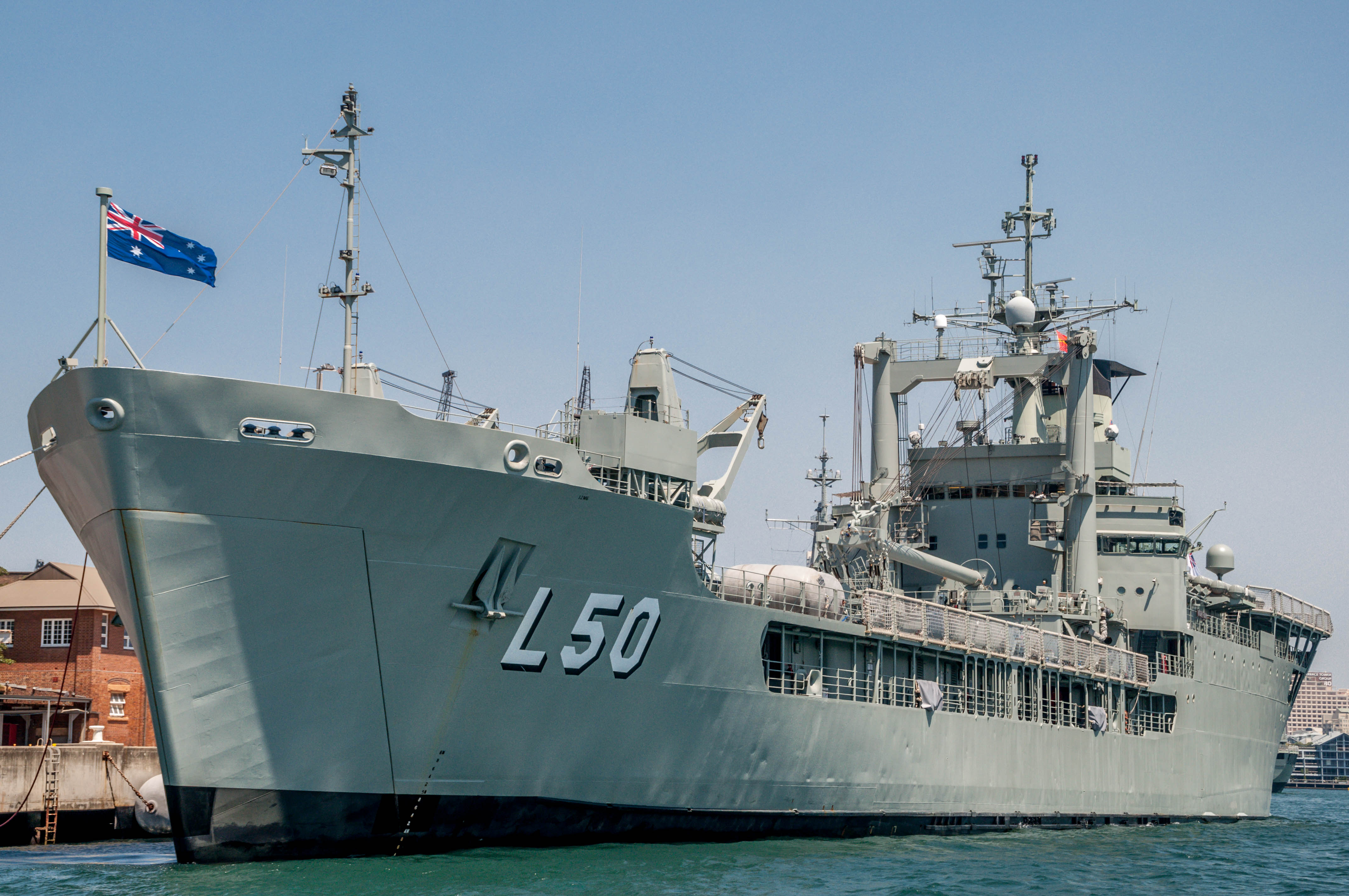
- HMAS Tobruk at Fleet Base East in 2013

History

Australia
- Namesake: The Siege of Tobruk
- Ordered: 3 November 1977 (construction contract signed)
- Builder: Carrington Slipways, Tomago
- Cost: $59 million
- Laid down: 7 February 1978
- Launched: 1 March 1980
- Commissioned: 23 April 1981
- Decommissioned: 31 July 2015
- Motto: "Faithful and Strong"
- Honours and awards: Battle honours: East Timor 1999; Plus two inherited honours; Awards: Meritorious Unit Citation
- Fate: Scuttled 29 June 2018 as a Dive wreck
- Badge

General characteristics
- Class & type: Modified Round Table-class Landing Ship Heavy
- Displacement: 3,353 tons (standard); 5,791 (full load)
- Length: 127 m (417 ft)
- Beam: 18.3 m (60 ft)
- Draught: 4.9 m (16 ft)
- Propulsion: 2 × Mirrlees Blackstone KDMR8 diesel engines, 9,600 horsepower (7,200 kW), 2 shafts
- Speed: 18 knots (33 km/h; 21 mph)
- Range: 8,000 nautical miles (15,000 km; 9,200 mi) at 15 knots (28 km/h; 17 mph)
- Boats & landing craft carried: 2 × LCM-8, 2 × LCVP, 2 x NLE pontoons
- Capacity: 300 to 520 soldiers (long vs. short term); 1,300 tons of cargo or 330 lane metres of vehicles
- Complement: 148, including 13 officers (as of 2012)
- Sensors & processing systems: Kelvin Hughes Type 1006 surface search radar; Kelvin Hughes Type 1007 navigational radar
- Armament: As built: 2 × 12.7 mm machine guns; 2 × Bofors 40/60 bow mounted guns; Final: 6 × 12.7 mm machine guns; 2 × Mini Typhoon Guns
- Aviation facilities: 2 helicopter spots on main cargo deck; 1 helicopter spot on rear flight deck; Both decks rated up to Chinook

HMAS Tobruk (L 50) was a Landing Ship Heavy (LSH) of the Royal Australian Navy (RAN), based on the design of the Round Table-class of the British Royal Fleet Auxiliary. Planning for the ship began in the 1970s to provide the Australian Army with a permanent sealift capability. She was laid down by Carrington Slipways in 1979, launched in 1980, and commissioned in 1981. She was a multi-purpose, roll-on/roll-off heavy lift ship capable of transporting soldiers, APCs, and tanks, and delivering them to shore via landing craft or directly by beaching.

The ship experienced problems during her early career with her engines (which differed from the British base design) and sewage system (leading to the death of a cadet in 1981). During the 1980s, the ship delivered supplies to the Multinational Force and Observers on the Sinai Peninsula, assisted in the withdrawal from RAAF Base Butterworth, provided support and accommodation for delegates to the South Pacific Forum, and was part of the Australian response to the 1987 Fijian coups d'état. In the early 1990s, Tobruk was part of ceremonies marking the 75th anniversary of the landing at Anzac Cove, then after a refit, participated in peacekeeping efforts in Somalia.

Plans to replace Tobruk with one of the Kanimbla-class ships began in 1993. She was offered for sale to the Royal New Zealand Navy, which refused because of the ship's manpower requirements. Delays in converting the Kanimblas for service meant Tobruk continued with normal operations during the 1990s. Attempts to sell the ship to the British and the Portuguese did not succeed, and in 1997 the decision was made to keep Tobruk, as the Kanimblas could not completely replace the heavy lift capability provided. During this period, Tobruk was deployed to Bougainville on several occasions as peacekeeping operations during the Bougainville Civil War. At the end of the decade, Tobruk operated as part of the INTERFET peacekeeping operation in East Timor.

In 2000 and 2001, Tobruk was sent to the Solomon Islands on several deployments in response to the civil war: first to evacuate Australian citizens, then as a neutral venue for peace talks. From late 2001 to early 2002, the ship was in northern Australian waters on border-protection duties as part of Operation Relex. During 2005 and early 2006, Tobruk sailed to the Middle East on several occasions to deliver vehicles and cargo to Australian forces in the region. Tobruk and the two Kanimblas were set to East Timor in mid-2006 in response to the 2006 East Timorese crisis, forming the first RAN amphibious readiness group since World War II. The rest of the decade included further border protection deployments under Operation Resolute, a visit to Hawaii for the RIMPAC multinational naval exercise, support for the Army Aboriginal Community Assistance Program, relief operations following the 2009 Samoa earthquake and tsunami, and use as the venue for a Fall Out Boy concert.

After spending several months in 2010 undergoing extended maintenance, Tobruk participated in the United States Navy's Pacific Partnership humanitarian assistance deployment. Because of the need for propeller shaft repairs, Tobruk could not be part of the military response to Cyclone Yasi. Heavy use and lack of maintenance in previous years began to take its toll, with Tobruk unavailable for service on several occasions during the early 2010s. As the two Kanimblas had been forced out of service by ongoing issues, the Australian government had to charter a succession of civilian ships to provide standby heavy transport capability. In 2013, Tobruk again participated in Pacific Partnership, followed by a visit to the Philippines with disaster relief supplies after Typhoon Haiyan. In early 2015, the ship was part of the response to Cyclone Pam's impact on Vanuatu. Tobruk was decommissioned in July 2015, and was scuttled as a dive wreck in June 2018.

== Design and construction ==
In the late 1970s, it was decided that the Australian Army needed to be provided with a long-term sealift capability, preferably through the acquisition of a dedicated cargo ship. The chartering of civilian ships to provide this capability when required—as had been done with the merchant vessels Jeparit and Boonaroo during the Vietnam War—was considered and rejected, because Australian National Line was unable to provide the necessary level of support. It was decided that a purpose-built ship would be constructed for the role, and would be operated by the RAN. While the Army did not require that the ship be capable of beaching, the RAN set this as a requirement, to maximise the ship's flexibility. In 1975, the Navy successfully convinced Australian Military's Force Structure Committee to endorse this requirement over the Army's opposition, and the committee authorised the purchase of a Landing Ship Heavy (LSH) on 19 March 1975.

HMAS Tobruk beaching during an exercise in 2006

Two designs were considered for Tobruk, with a modified Sir- or Round Table-class landing ship logistics, in use with the Royal Fleet Auxiliary at the time, selected for construction. Tobruk's design was based on RFA Sir Bedivere, the second of the class, which had been modified following the Royal Fleet Auxiliary's experience with operating the class' lead ship, RFA Sir Lancelot. The ship was designed as a multi-purpose, roll-on/roll-off heavy lift and transport vessel. The Australian modifications to the design were kept to a minimum to simplify construction; the most significant changes were to improve the ship's ability to operate both large and multiple helicopters, fitting an operations room, and adding a derrick with a lift of 70 tonnes. Most of the other changes related to bringing accommodation conditions into line with Australian requirements. Like the other ships of the Round Table class, Tobruk was built to commercial rather than military standards, and was unable to sustain as much damage as warships.

The ship had a standard displacement of 3,353 tons, and a full load displacement of 5,791 tons. She was 127 metres (417 ft) in length, with a beam of 18.3 metres (60 ft), and a draught of 4.9 metres (16 ft). Propulsion machinery consisted of two Mirrlees Blackstone KDMR8 diesels, providing 9,600 horsepower (7,200 kW) to the ship's two propeller shafts. The ship was fitted with different engines to those used in the equivalent British ships, which were proven unreliable early in Tobruk's career. Top speed was 18 knots (33 km/h; 21 mph), with a range of 8,000 nautical miles (15,000 km; 9,200 mi) at 15 knots (28 km/h; 17 mph). A 400 horsepower (300 kW) bow thruster was also fitted to assist with confined-waters manoeuvring. Armament initially consisted of two 40/60 Bofors guns, supplemented by two 12.7 mm machine guns. During the 1990s, the Bofors were removed. They were later replaced by two Mini Typhoon 12.7 mm mounts, which were not permanently installed but fitted as needed, and the number of standard 12.7 mm machine guns was increased to six. The sensor suite included a Kelvin Hughes Type 1006 surface search radar and a Kelvin Hughes Type 1007 navigational radar. In 2012, the ship's company was 148, including 13 officers.

Tobruk was capable of embarking between 300 and 520 soldiers (extended duration versus short term), along with 1,300 tons of cargo or 330 lane metres of vehicles (equivalent to 18 Leopard 1 or M1 Abrams main battle tanks plus 40 M113 armored personnel carriers or Australian Light Armoured Vehicles). Vehicles and cargo could be embarked via bow or stern ramps, with the reinforced tank-deck running the length of the ship, and inter-deck transfer ramps fitted. The bow ramp was contained behind horizontal-opening bow doors, and could be extended and lowered for beach or harbour loading, while at the stern a combined door-ramp could be used conventionally when at suitable facilities, or for ramp-to-ramp loading of landing craft at sea. Additional cargo handling was provided by the 70-tonne Velle heavy lift derrick (a feature singled out for attention in Jane's Fighting Ships), supplemented by two 8.5-tonne Favco cranes. Two LCM-8 landing craft could be carried in cradles on the main deck, while two LCVPs were carried in derricks on the superstructure. Two Naval Lighterage Equipment pontoons could be carried on the ship's flanks to extend the reach of the bow ramp when beaching, or as rafts to transport cargo ashore. The ship had an aft helicopter platform capable of handling aircraft up to Westland Sea King size, while the main deck (once cleared of landing craft and cargo) could be used as a secondary flight deck for helicopters up to Boeing CH-47 Chinook size. Both flight decks could be operated simultaneously and both had capability for landed or at-hover refuelling.

Tobruk was built by Carrington Slipways in Tomago, New South Wales. The company was selected following a competitive tender in May 1977, with contract negotiations completed on 3 November 1977. Construction of Tobruk formally began on 7 February 1978, when the ship's keel was laid. Tobruk was launched on 1 March 1980 by Lady Anna Cowen, wife of Governor General Zelman Cowen. The ship left the dockyard for the first time in December 1980: her construction had been delayed by over four months by industrial disputes, and her final cost of A$59 million was 42 percent greater than originally estimated. The ship's sea trials were conducted in early 1981 off Newcastle and Port Stephens by a joint Navy-Army-civilian crew, and fitting out was completed on 7 April 1981. Tobruk was handed over to the Navy on 11 April 1981 and was commissioned at Newcastle on 23 April. The ship's name had been selected in 1976 and refers to the Siege of Tobruk during World War II, in which the RAN's 'Scrap Iron Flotilla' supplied the besieged 9th Australian Division. She was the second RAN ship of this name; preceded by the Battle-class destroyer HMAS Tobruk (D37). She was the first purpose-built major amphibious vessel in RAN service, and was classified as a Landing Ship Heavy by the RAN.

== Operational history ==
=== 1980s ===
Following her commissioning, Tobruk proceeded to her initial home port of HMAS Moreton in Brisbane, Queensland for the first time, then undertook further sea trials. These trials were conducted during the winter of 1981, and were intended to both test whether the ship met her design specifications and develop procedures for landing helicopters and beaching. The trials were generally successful, although Tobruk's engines continued to be unreliable and problems were encountered with the sewage system. The ship undertook its first tasking in the spring of 1981 when she transported elements of the 16th Air Defence Regiment, Royal Australian Artillery from Adelaide to Port Alma, Queensland. Following this Tobruk proceeded to Port Phillip Bay and suffered a serious engine malfunction while approaching Station Pier. While the engines were repaired, the main engine control mechanism was later found to be entirely unreliable and had to be redesigned and reconstructed at Brisbane. During trials following this repair the ship's sewage system seriously malfunctioned, fatally gassing one of the Australian Navy Cadets who had been embarked for seagoing experience. The cadet's death led to an inquiry into the ship by the Commonwealth Government's Auditor General which concluded that she should not have been accepted by the RAN at the time she was commissioned due to the number of defects still present.

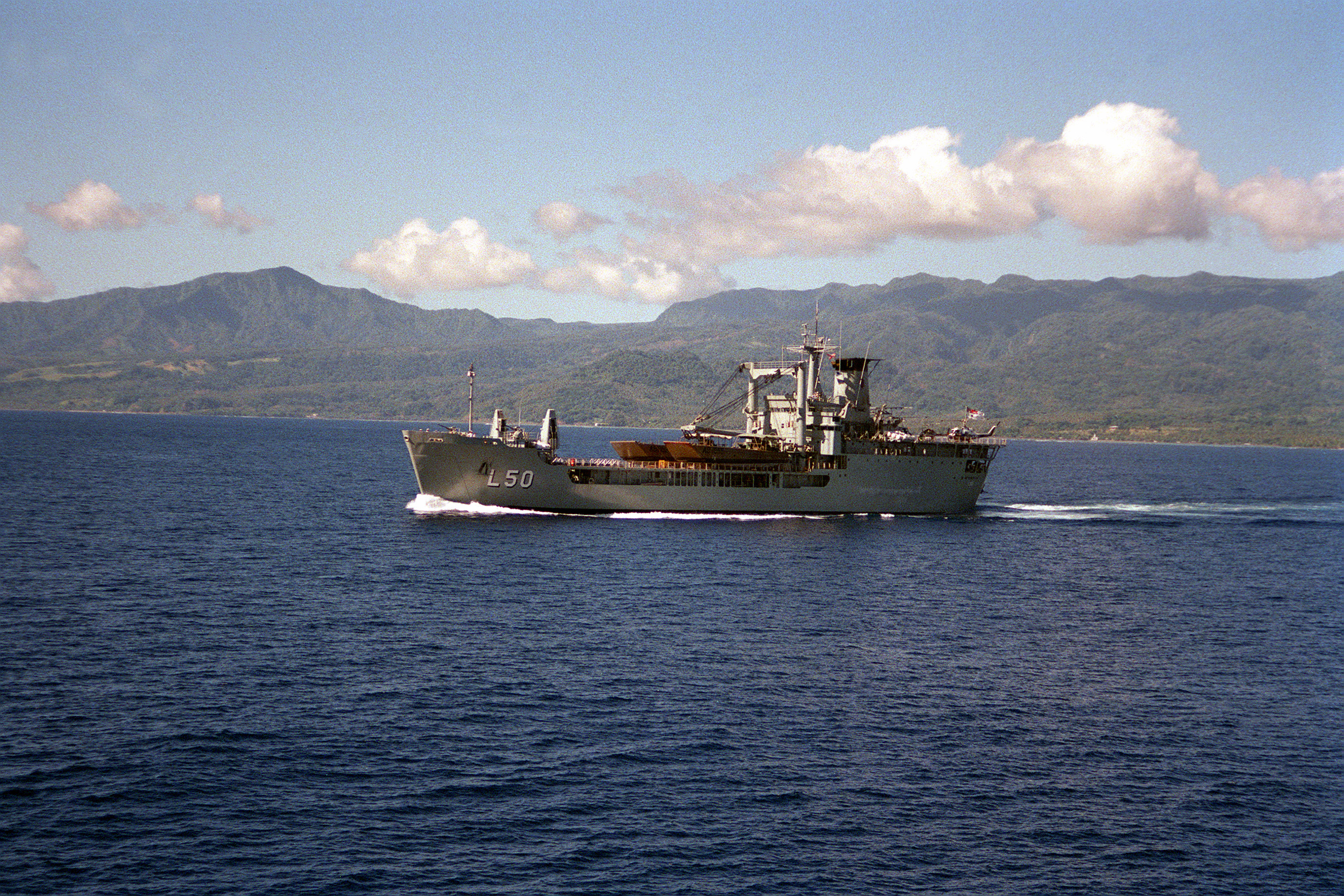
HMAS Tobruk in 1987

Tobruk conducted her first trips outside Australia in the early 1980s. On 15 February 1982, the ship left Brisbane to transport eight Bell UH-1 Iroquois helicopters from the Royal Australian Air Force, plus supporting stores, to join the Australian contingent to the Multinational Force and Observers in the Sinai Peninsula. Tobruk arrived in Ashdod, Israel on 19 March, becoming the first Australian warship to visit the country, and arrived back in Brisbane on 30 April. The ship transported cyclone relief stores to Tonga in May and spent the remainder of the year undertaking tasks in Australian waters. These included supporting the 1982 Commonwealth Games, which were held in Brisbane. In early 1983, Tobruk travelled to Malaysia to assist the RAAF in withdrawing units from RAAF Base Butterworth. In February 1984, Tobruk took part in exercises in New Zealand, before travelling to Tuvalu in August, where she provided support and accommodation for delegates to the South Pacific Forum. In late 1985, the naval base HMAS Moreton was decommissioned, prompting the disbanding of the Amphibious Squadron (which had consisted of Tobruk and the six Balikpapan-class landing craft) and the relocation of Tobruk's homeport to Fleet Base East in Sydney.

In May 1987, Tobruk formed part of the Australian military force which deployed to Fiji following the 1987 Fijian coups d'état. The goal of this deployment, which was designated Operation Morris Dance, was to evacuate Australian citizens if necessary. Tobruk left Sydney carrying Army stores and five helicopters on 21 May and embarked 'B' Company of the 1st Battalion, Royal Australian Regiment (1RAR) at Norfolk Island on 23 May. Tobruk joined HMA Ships Sydney, Parramatta and Success off Suva on 26 May. By this time it had become clear that there would not be a need to evacuate Australians from Fiji, and Tobruk proceeded to support the South Pacific Forum meeting at Apia, Samoa after cross-decking the troops and their supplies to the other ships. Operation Morris Dance revealed serious shortcomings in the Australian Defence Force's ability to deploy forces outside Australia, with the Army unit having no previous experience of amphibious operations and the naval helicopters being unable to carry Army supplies.

After Operation Morris Dance, Tobruk returned to mainly routine duties. She travelled to New Zealand on a training cruise in early 1988 and was placed on alert to carry an Army force to evacuate Australian civilians from Vanuatu in April 1988 following a political crisis there. While Tobruk was loaded with stores and three Sea King helicopters, this deployment did not eventuate and the ship was unloaded on 24 May. The ship transported the 6th Battalion, Royal Australian Regiment's vehicles and supplies to the west coast of the United States in early 1989 and participated in a joint Australian, British, Canadian and American amphibious warfare exercise at Monterey Bay. The ship then visited Canada before returning to Australia. In December 1989, Tobruk was forced to undergo unscheduled repairs at Newcastle to repair damage caused by excessive vibration, which had possibly been caused by her engines revving at a higher rate than the ship had been designed for.

=== 1990s ===
Tobruk began the 1990s with another deployment at short notice to the South Pacific. On 26 January 1990, she was tasked to assist with evacuating Australian citizens from Bougainville in Papua New Guinea; this operation was cancelled in early February while the ship was travelling to the island from Sydney. On 5 March, Tobruk left Sydney bound for Gallipoli, Turkey in company with HMAS Sydney to participate in ceremonies marking the 75th anniversary of the landing at Anzac Cove. Tobruk carried vehicles, stores and support personnel for the ceremony on 25 April, with many of the ship's crew also going ashore to visit the battlefields on Anzac Day. In 1991, the ship was refitted by Forgacs (formerly Carrington Slipways) in the company's new floating dock. The refit was delayed by industrial action by the Painters and Dockers Union.

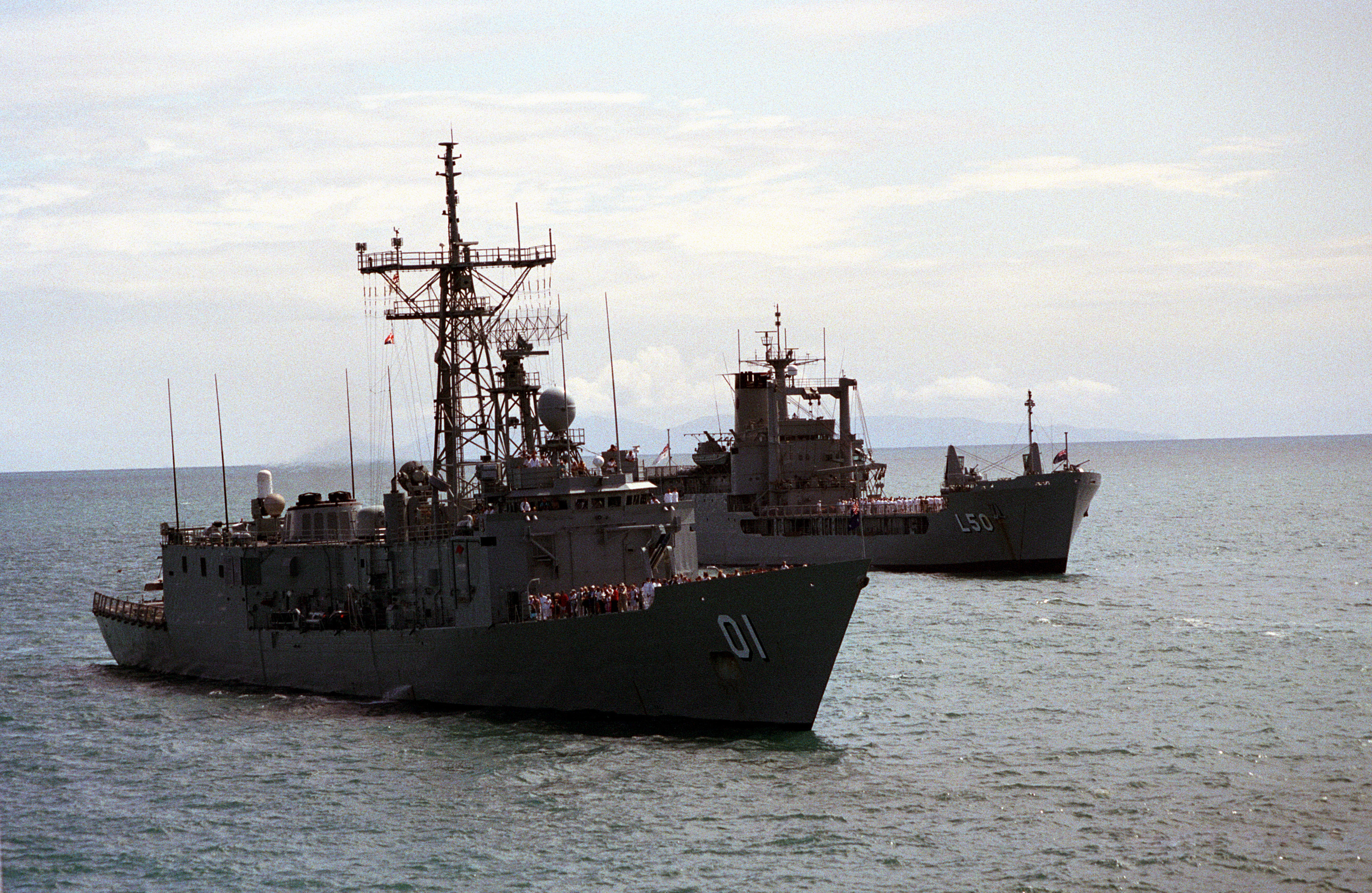
Tobruk with Adelaide underway as part of an Australian/U.S. Navy task group commemorating the 50th anniversary of the Battle of the Coral Sea in May 1992

In late December 1992, Tobruk was selected to take part in Operation Solace, Australia's contribution to the international peacekeeping effort in Somalia. Initial notice of the deployment was given on 9 December, then confirmed on 15 December, with personnel recalled from leave. Working-up exercises ran between 22 and 26 December, before the ship left Sydney for Townsville. En route, the ship's company was informed that Tobruk would remain on station in Somalia for the duration of Operation Solace. In Townsville, equipment and vehicles for 1RAR and elements of the 3rd/4th Cavalry Regiment (Australia). Tobruk sailed for Somalia on 1 January 1993: the loading process was delayed by another serious toxic gas incident in one of the ship's sewerage plants. The sealift operation in support Operation Solace, conducted by Tobruk and Jervis Bay, was the largest performed by the RAN since the Vietnam War. Tobruk arrived at Mogadishu on 19 January, and unloaded during 20 January. She spent the next few days at anchor, during which she was used as a training platform for boarding and seizure operations by the United States Navy SEALs, in their preparation for the arrival of a merchant vessel smuggling weapons. Between 26 and 28 January, Tobruk visited Mombasa, Kenya to collect building materials for the reconstruction of the United States embassy in Somalia.

The ship remained in Somali waters until late May, apart from runs to Mombasa to embark humanitarian supplies, along with a port visit to the Seychelles in late April. As well as providing heavy lift and logistic support, Tobruk provided the main communications link for 1RAR back to Australia, and served as a venue for rest and recreation for soldiers. Re-embarkation of Australian equipment began on 14 May, and Tobruk sailed for home on 20 May. The ship called at Diego Garcia and Singapore before unloading in Townsville, then returning to Sydney on 21 June. After a maintenance period lasting until August, Tobruk resumed normal exercise and training routines. The ship was awarded the Gloucester Cup for 1993 for her service off Somalia and subsequent operations during the year.

In 1993, the Australian Government decided to purchase two ex-United States Navy Newport-class tank landing ships to replace Tobruk and the navy's training and sealift ship Jervis Bay in 1994. Plans were developed to place Tobruk in reserve or lease her to the Royal New Zealand Navy (RNZN). While the New Zealand government was interested in obtaining a sealift ship, the RNZN did not feel that it could afford to crew and operate Tobruk and the negotiations with New Zealand ended unsuccessfully in September 1994. The unexpected difficulty of converting the two LSTs into the Kanimbla class led to the date of Tobruk's retirement being postponed to mid-1996, with the ship continuing normal operations. After the negotiations with New Zealand ended, the RAN opened negotiations with the Royal Fleet Auxiliary, which was considering scrapping one of its Round Tables and replacing it with Tobruk. A British team travelled to Australia to inspect the ship in December 1994, but this sale did not eventuate. The Portuguese Navy expressed interest in buying Tobruk in 1995 and sent a team to Sydney in 1996 to inspect the ship. During this period Tobruk remained in active service, and in 1997 the new Liberal Party government decided to retain her until 2010 as the two LSTs could not fully replace her ability to carry heavy equipment. The period of uncertainty about the ship's fate led to a deterioration in her material condition, as she did not receive a major refit during the period she was up for sale.

Tobruk played an important role in efforts to end the civil war in Bougainville during the 1990s. In September 1994, she transported an Australian peacekeeping force to Bougainville to protect peace talks which were attempting to end the civil war on the island. These talks were not successful and during the deployment one of the ship's Sea King helicopters was damaged by small arms fire; the first damage sustained by a RAN unit since the Vietnam War. A peace agreement was signed in October 1997, and Tobruk returned to Bougainville in November of that year to deploy a peace monitoring group. The ship made several voyages to the island during the first four months of 1998 to support the peace process. Further voyages to Bougainville took place in September 1998, February 2000 and August 2003; the last of these was to extract the peace monitoring group following the successful conclusion of this mission. Tobruk also participated in a major international exercise in South East Asia in 1999.

In 1999 and 2000, Tobruk took part in the international peacekeeping effort in East Timor. On 30 August 1999, the day the referendum which led to East Timor's independence was held, she left Sydney for Townsville to load elements of the 3rd Brigade in case there was a need to evacuate Australians and other foreigners from East Timor. The referendum was followed by widespread violence and the Indonesian government agreed to an international peacekeeping force (the International Force for East Timor, INTERFET) being deployed to East Timor in mid-September. Tobruk left Darwin on 18 September under escort by HMS Glasgow, and arrived at Dili on 21 September. The ship made six further voyages between Darwin and East Timor in September and October 1999, and continued to make an important contribution to the peacekeeping operation until November, when she returned to Sydney for maintenance. Tobruk made two further trips to East Timor in March and April 2000. Tobruk was later awarded the battle honour "East Timor 1999" in recognition of her contribution to INTERFET.

=== 2000–2015 ===
In mid-2000, a civil war broke out in the Solomon Islands; Tobruk was ordered to the islands' capital, Honiara, to evacuate Australian citizens. She arrived on 8 June and embarked 486 civilians, who were then transported to Cairns, Queensland. After a brief maintenance period, Tobruk returned to the Solomons in late June, where she served as the venue for peace talks. She spent almost all of July at anchor off Honiara and returned to Australia after a cease-fire agreement was signed on board the ship on 2 August. Tobruk made a further voyage to the Solomons in December 2000 to support the International Peace Monitoring team which had been established there. A peace treaty ending the conflict was signed on board the ship on 7 February 2001 and she returned to Sydney on 15 February. Tobruk took part of Operation Relex in late 2001 and early 2002 where she transported would-be refugees to Nauru and Christmas Island. She also made a further voyage from Darwin to East Timor in April 2002 to deliver supplies to the Australian Defence Force units there.

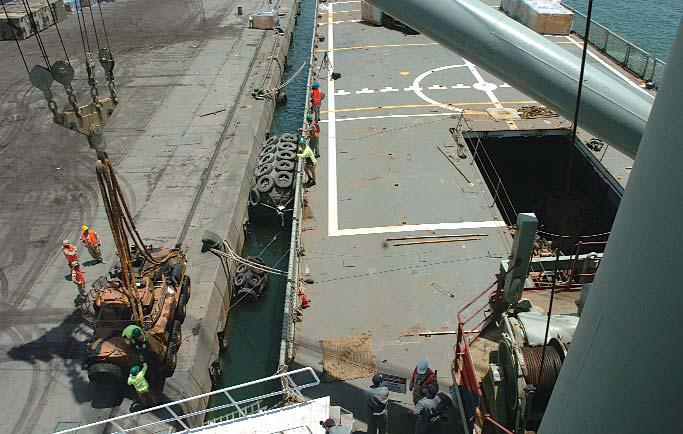
Tobruk unloading an ASLAV during her deployment to the Middle East in 2005

In April 2005, HMAS Tobruk left Sydney to transport 20 ASLAVs to Kuwait, where they would equip the Australian Army's Al Muthanna Task Group in Iraq. The ASLAVs were embarked at Darwin on 18 April and the ship arrived at Kuwait on 9 May. She returned to Australia via India, arriving back in Sydney on 22 June. Tobruk undertook a second voyage to the Middle East in late 2006 to transport the equipment for the Army forces in the Reconstruction Task Force in Afghanistan and arrived home via the Philippines in April 2007.

Tobruk travelled to Nias Island in Indonesia in March 2006 to support ceremonies commemorating the anniversary of the crash of an RAN Sea King helicopter there on 2 April 2005. Following this deployment, she took part in Exercise Croix du Sud off New Caledonia, then proceeded to the Philippines where she was to embark a North American Rockwell OV-10 Bronco aircraft destined for the Australian War Memorial. In mid-May, Tobruk was recalled from her voyage to the Philippines to embark elements of the 3rd Brigade for an urgent deployment to East Timor following fighting caused by unrest in the country's military. She proceeded to Dili in company with the Navy's two Kanimbla-class landing platform amphibious ships. This was the first time that an Australian amphibious readiness group had been formed since World War II. The Group departed from Townsville on 23 May and arrived at Dili a few days later. After unloading her cargo, Tobruk returned to Townsville where she embarked a second load of vehicles and supplies for the Australian forces in East Timor, arriving back at Dili in the first week of June. She returned to Sydney in late June.

In November 2006 it was reported that while the Department of Defence had engaged a specialist to supervise the removal of large quantities of asbestos from Tobruk, her crew were concerned that the ship was continuing operations during the overhaul. The report also stated that removal of the material had been delayed for several years due to the ship's high operational tempo.

In late December 2007, two groups of 60 Australian Navy Cadets and staff were embarked aboard Tobruk for the final part of the ship's deployment with Operation Resolute and the return voyage from Darwin to Sydney. This was the first time cadets had been embarked under these conditions. The first group remained aboard until Tobruk arrived in Cairns, where they were replaced with the second group for the return to Sydney.

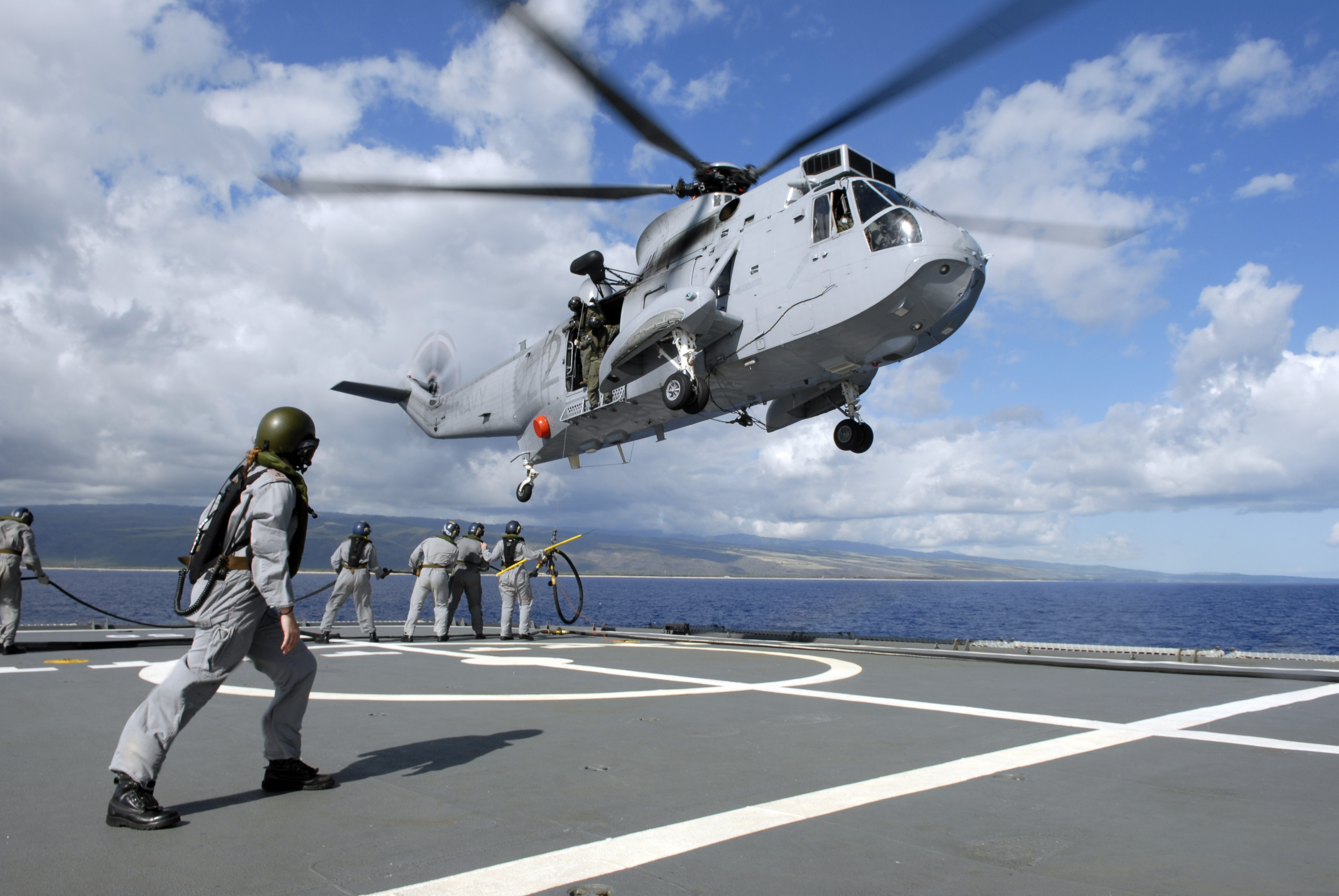
An 817 Squadron RAN Sea King helicopter landing on Tobruk's stern flight deck in 2008

In 2008, Tobruk formed part of the Australia Defence Force's contingent during the annual RIMPAC exercise off Hawaii. She left Sydney on 10 June and returned on 18 August. During the exercise Tobruk embarked and landed United States Marines Amphibious Assault Vehicles. In October, Tobruk and HMAS Brunei supported the Army Aboriginal Community Assistance Program (AACAP) by transporting equipment from Kalumburu, Western Australia at the end of an AACAP project.

On 22 February 2009, Tobruk was used as the venue for a Fall Out Boy concert. From 3 April to 24 June she operated off northern Australia as part of Operation Resolute. On 16 April she was one of the ships which responded to an explosion on board the refugee ship 'Siev 36'. During this operation she provided medical treatment to people wounded in the blast and her embarked Sea King helicopter flew the more badly injured to Mungalalu Truscott Airbase. Tobruk subsequently carried 136 refugees to Christmas Island in early May. During the period 3 April to 24 June she spent 79 days at sea and only four in port, steamed 16,867 nautical miles (31,238 km) and embarked more than 250 asylum seekers. In October 2009 she sailed to Samoa to conduct relief operations after the islands were affected by the 2009 Samoa earthquake and tsunami.

Tobruk completed a period of extended maintenance in April 2010. As of late May that year, she had sailed 823,587 nautical miles (1,525,283 km; 947,767 mi) during her service with the RAN. During the first week of September 2010, Tobruk and two other RAN amphibious ships participated in the United States-led Pacific Partnership 2010 deployment in Papua New Guinea.

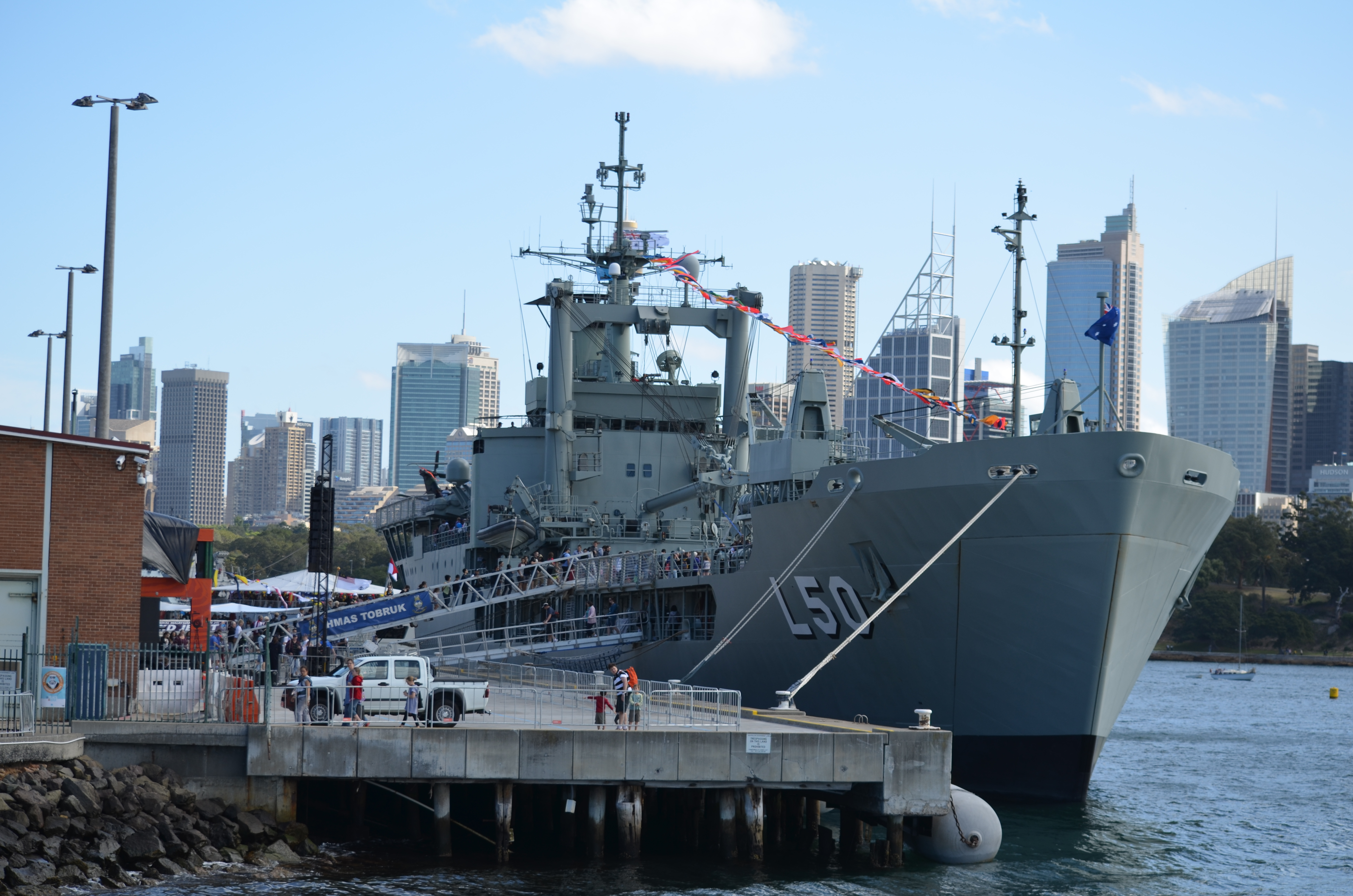
Tobruk during International Fleet Review 2013 Open Day

In early 2011, Tobruk was at Garden Island Naval Dockyard for heavy repairs to the propeller shaft. As a result, she was not available to participate in Operation Yasi Assist following Severe Tropical Cyclone Yasi and, due to both ships of the Kanimbla class being out of service with mechanical problems, the Navy did not have an amphibious transport capacity at the time. Minister for Defence Stephen Smith stated afterwards that he was misinformed about when Tobruk would be ready to put to sea if required. Temporary repairs were completed by 7 March, and the ship was returned to "48-hours deployment notice" status, although more permanent repairs would be required later. Following the 2011 Tōhoku earthquake and tsunami on 11 March 2011, Tobruk and Sydney were placed on alert to transport supplies and Australian Army engineers to Japan if this was requested by the Japanese Government. In May 2011, the ship began a two-month-long maintenance period in Sydney. To provide an amphibious capability during this refit, the civilian icebreaker Aurora Australis was chartered from May until August. Although Tobruk was to be active during late August and early September, she would then return to dockyard hands for further maintenance during September and October in preparation for the 2011–12 tropical cyclone season. The Australian Customs vessel Ocean Protector was used for humanitarian and disaster relief operations during Tobruk's docking.

In June 2013, Tobruk was deployed to Papua New Guinea as part of the annual United States Navy Pacific Partnership humanitarian assistance operation. Tobruk was designated the command platform for Pacific Partnership operations around Papua New Guinea during her seven-week deployment, and she was accompanied by the Japanese destroyer Yamagiri. In October, Tobruk participated in the International Fleet Review 2013. On 18 November, the ship sailed from Townsville with disaster relief supplies for Tacloban City and coastal regions of Leyte in the Philippines following Typhoon Haiyan. The ship returned to Sydney on 21 December.

In March 2015, Tobruk was deployed to Vanuatu as part of Australia's response to Cyclone Pam. The ship embarked 355 personnel and a helicopter. Tobruk visited Newcastle, her city of origin, for the seventh and final time on 19 June 2015. From there, the ship sailed to Sydney, arriving on 25 June. That day Prime Minister Tony Abbott, Leader of the Opposition Bill Shorten and Speaker of the House of Representatives Bronwyn Bishop made statements in parliament acknowledging the ship's service.

== Decommissioning and fate ==
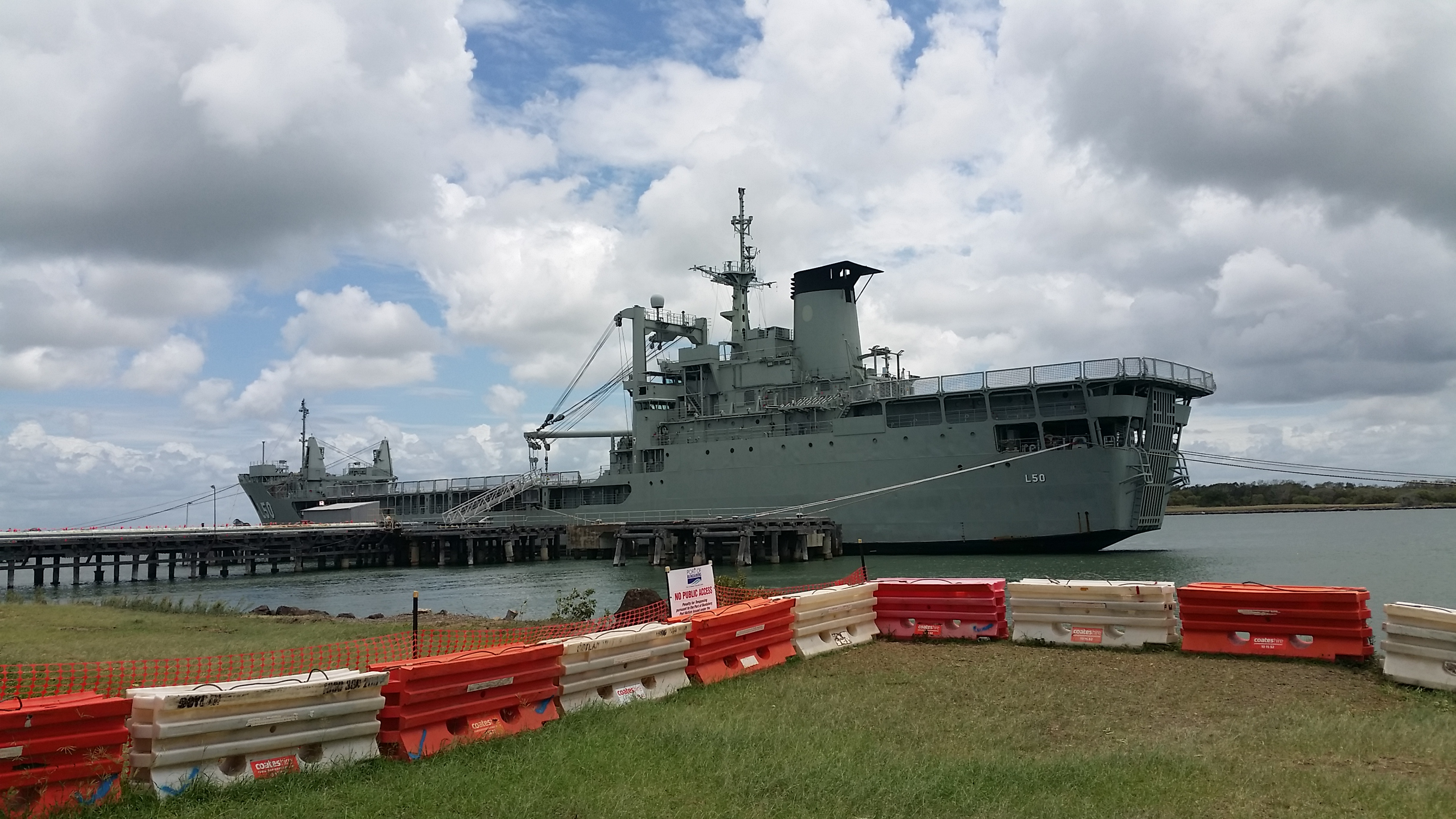
HMAS Tobruk at Training Ship Bundaberg in 2017

Tobruk was decommissioned in Sydney on 31 July 2015. During her 34-year operational history, Tobruk sailed over 947,000 nautical miles (1,754,000 km; 1,090,000 mi), and was deployed on 26 major operations (more than any other ADF unit), leading to a reputation as the "workhorse of the RAN".

Several entities called for the ship to be scuttled as a dive wreck. Federal Member of Parliament Keith Pitt spent several years campaigning for the scuttling of a warship in Hervey Bay as a tourist attraction, with Tobruk his preferred vessel. Another proposal came from the community of St Helens, Tasmania, for the ship to be sunk in Skeleton Bay. The Gold Coast also expressed interest.

On 2 December 2016 it was announced that Tobruk would be scuttled off the Fraser Coast, at a location halfway between Bundaberg and Hervey Bay, by late 2018. As the ship awaited its scuttling, Tobruk was located between the Australian Navy Cadet Base TS Bundaberg and the Burnett Heads Marina. The ship was transported to this area in late 2016 and was used as a tourist attraction whilst undergoing preparations for scuttling.

She was sunk off the coast between Bundaberg and Hervey Bay on 29 June 2018. Instead of coming to rest upright on its keel as planned, the ship rolled 90 degrees to starboard (right) and came to rest on its side in a position that severely limits dive opportunities.
