= HMAS Tobruk =

Two ships of the Royal Australian Navy have been named HMAS Tobruk, after the town of Tobruk in Libya and the siege fought there in 1941.

- HMAS Tobruk (D37), a Battle-class destroyer launched in 1947 and in service until 1960, when she was damaged beyond repair during a gunnery exercise
- HMAS Tobruk (L 50), a modified Round Table-class Landing Ship Heavy launched in 1980 and decommissioned in 2015

== Battle honours ==
Three battle honours have been awarded to ships named HMAS Tobruk:

- Korea 1951–53
- Malaya 1956
- East Timor 1999

== See also ==
- SS Tobruk
