= Australian Patrol Boat Group =

- Country: Australia
- Branch: Royal Australian Navy
- Type: Force Element Group
- Headquarters: HMAS Coonawarra

The Australian Patrol Boat Group is a Force Element Group (FEG) of the Royal Australian Navy. It manages the Navy's patrol boats.

The Patrol Boat Group operates six Armidale-class patrol boats. The Group's headquarters is located at HMAS Coonawarra in the city of Darwin, additional support is provided by the class logistics office at HMAS Cairns.

== History ==
There have been three classes of patrol boat to serve in the Royal Australian Navy; the Attack class from 1967 to 1994, the Fremantle class from 1980 to 2007, and the Armidale class, which entered service in 2005.

=== 1900s ===
During the 1960s to mid-1980s, the local Australia Patrol Boat was divided into three main squadrons which were ported in the regions of Sydney (NSW), Cairns (Qld) and Darwin (NT). In the mid-1980s, the separation of squadrons was discontinued; HMAS Coonawarra, Darwin was established as the centralised headquarters.

=== 2000s ===
In 2002, increased illegal activity in Australia's northern maritime zones instigated the relocation of the patrol headquarters and vessels. This change resulted in the increase of capacity of the primary ports in Coonawarra, Darwin and Cairns, Queensland to incorporate the vessels from the Sydney home port, which was disestablished.

=== 2010s ===
In July 2010, the Australian Border Force submitted a request for the construction of a new class of patrol vessels to supplement, and eventually replace, the patrol capacities of the Bay Class Patrol Group (which were due to end service in early 2010). From the 2010–2011 budget, Australian government commissioned eight larger, upgraded vessels, named the Cape class. The $350m contract, stipulating the vessels' design, construction, and ongoing maintenance, was awarded to Austal on 12 August 2011. The vessels entered service over March 2013 to September 2015.

On 18 December 2014, the RAN was forced to decommission the Patrol Boat group's HMAS Bundaberg of the Armidale Fleet. The vessel had sustained irreparable damage during a refit in August 2014 by a fire aboard the ship. To supplement the Armidale class, Austal was commissioned for two additional Cape-class patrol boats for the Royal Australian Navy (RAN), which were completed in 2017.

=== Insignia ===
Commencing in 1968, the Australian Naval Board changed the visual squadron designation of all RAN vessels to the US classification style. The new patrol squadron classifications included:

· AUSPABRON 1 (First Australian Patrol Boat Squadron)

· AUSPABRON 2 (Second Australian Patrol Boat Squadron)

· AUSPABRON 3 (Third Australian Patrol Boat Squadron)

· PNGPABRON (Papua/New Guinea Patrol Boat Squadron)

Australian Patrol boats also adopted the traditional number system of the British Royal Navy. Single numbers were painted on the funnel of individual vessels as intra squadron identification. Each squadron also developed regional insignia, relating to its operational area.

The Sydney squadron, AUSPABRON 1, displayed the motif of a red kangaroo superimposed upon the harbour bridge.

The Cairns squadron, AUSPABRON 2, displayed the symbol of a blue marlin and the number 2 ringed in gold. The signification of the marlin was adopted from the official badge of HMAS Cairns.

The Darwin squadron, AUSPABRON 3, displayed the number 3 and an insignia of a water buffalo.

Patrol boats stationed in other Australian areas including Western Australia, Tasmania and South Australia also developed regional inspired insignia. These Included a black swan, Tasmanian devil, and magpie, respectively. The Papua New Guinea region squadron's Attack-class patrol boat insignia was unofficially displayed as a shark circling a palm tree.

Following the mid-1980s dissolution of separate regional squadrons, the squadron numerical identification ceased. Current nomenclature is displayed on the vessel's pennant, as a 2 to 3-digit number. Each patrol vessel is also ascribed a name according to their region of operation.

=== Relevant legislation evolution ===
The Maritime Power Bill 2012 was introduced by the Gillard government on 30 May 2012. The 2012 Attorney-General Department stated the purpose for the bill was to "harmonise and simplify" existing legislation by creating a clear framework for the extent and abilities of Australian maritime enforcement powers. This framework outlines the authorisation of capabilities held by current vessels including Australian Patrol Boat Groups.

The Maritime Powers (Consequential Amendments) Bill 2012 was introduced concurrently to the Maritime Power Bill 2012. The most significant action of the bill was repealing all maritime enforcement powers contained within the Migration Act 1958, as these powers were now enshrined within the new Maritime Power Bill. The bill repealed subsection 245F (8), which defined the ability of Australian vessels, including Patrol boat groups, to turn back unauthorised boats in Australian waters. However, this amendment was stated by the Attorney-General Department to not reduce or increase existing maritime powers. These Bills were passed and enforced as of 13 March 2013.

== The Patrol Boat Group today ==
The Australian Defence Force sets the Patrol Boat Group's mandate as to "protect the Australian border and offshore interests" ("Patrol Boat, General", n.d.). In concurrence with this federal policy, Australian patrol boats are tasked with constabulary and environmental protective duties. In peacetime, the group commit to civil surveillance and enforce Australian law on the border, policing illegal activity including unauthorised entry, illegal immigration, breaches of customs and drug smuggling. Patrol vessels also enhance law enforcement aiding preservation efforts to retain the condition of Australian marine life, aquatic environment, and resources.

Active vessels are authorised with multiple law enforcement responsibilities. The Royal Australian Navy authorises the currently active Armidale-class vessels with "tracking, intercepting, stopping and boarding other vessels, and sometimes arresting their crews and seizing cargo." ("Patrol Boat, General", n.d.).

These activities are supported and allied with the operations of Australian Federal Police, Australian Fisheries and Australian Border Force. Patrol vessels have jurisdiction in coastal Australian maritime zones, surrounding Australian island territories and Australia's exclusive economic zone (EEZ). The majority of patrol operations occur in northern maritime zones.

The Armidale-class fleet was commissioned into the RAN and became operational on 24 June 2005. and remains in active service as of 2021 and currently consists of 12 active vessels. In addition to the Armidale-class patrol boats, two additional Cape-class vessels (ADV Cape Fourcroy and ADV Cape Inscription) are also in active service. All 14 vessels act as naval support for civilian authorities to enforce Australian regulation of maritime law and environment. The Patrol group provides 21 trained available crews to allow rotation.

Active patrol boat tetails
Name	Pennant	Commissioned
HMAS Armidale II	P83	24 June 2005
HMAS Larrakia II	P84	10 February 2006
HMAS Bathurst II	P85	10 February 2006
HMAS Albany	P86	15 July 2006
HMAS Broome II	P90	10 February 2007
HMAS Wollongong III	P92	23 June 2007
HMAS Childers	P93	7 July 2007
HMAS Launceston III	P94	22 September 2007
HMAS Maryborough II	P95	8 December 2007
ADV Cape Fourcroy	310	2017
ADV Cape Inscription	320	2017
ADV Cape Otway	314	2022
ADV Cape Peron	315	2022
ADV Cape Naturaliste	316	2022
ADV Cape Capricorn	317	2023
ADV Cape Woolamai	318	2023
ADV Cape Solander	312	2024
ADV Cape Schanck	313	2024

== Role in Operation Sovereign Borders ==
In cooperation with Australian Border Force, Australian Patrol boats are the primary contribution to the National policy of “Operation Sovereign Borders” which was implemented by the Abbott government in 2013. Under the Policy, between its enactment and September 2018, Patrol boats intercepted and apprehended 33 vessels in Australian maritime zones. 827 individuals aboard were refouled and returned to their original country.

== Ongoing/future vessels and contracts ==
The federal defence initiative, the National Shipbuilding Plan aims to build 12 offshore patrol vessels (OPVs) to supplement, and eventually succeed the current Armidale-class fleet. In May 2017, Luerssen Australia Pty Ltd was selected as the main contractor and designer of the SEA1180 Offshore Patrol Vessel program. The company's US$3.6B contract stipulated the design and construction of 12 offshore patrol vessels for the Royal Australian Navy. As of October 2018, the projected competition date is 2029–2030. Construction of the first two patrol boat began on 15 November 2018. Construction of the subsequent 10 OPVs bean on 27 March 2020, in the Western Australian Facility, the Henderson Maritime Precinct.

The Department of Defence estimated the building of the 12 OPVs would create over 1,200 Australian construction jobs: 400 direct and 600 indirect supply chain jobs.

Arafura-class offshore patrol vessels are anticipated to enter service in 2023. The role of these active vessels will be to "undertake patrol and response duties, security operations and border protection activities." The Arafura class was designed to enhance the capabilities of the current Australian patrol boat group to fulfil these constabulary, preventative and protection duties. Minister for Defence Reynolds expressed this mission statement as "The Arafura-class offshore patrol vessels are larger than the Armidale-class patrol boats currently in service with the Royal Australian Navy, and will offer greater endurance and capability for patrolling Australia's maritime borders."

In May 2020, six additional Cape-class vessels were ordered by the RAN to serve, in interim, for the upcoming Arafura class. The ordered vessels are constructed similarly to the current Cape class model, which is a “58 metre aluminium monohull patrol boat design”. Reported design enhancements include increased crew accommodation capacity from 22 people to 32 people and enable Wi-Fi connectivity aboard the vessel. The projected completion of the first Cape-class vessel (Hull 811) is September 2021, and the completion of all vessels is anticipated in 2023.

=== National Naval Shipbuilding Enterprise ===
The National naval shipbuilding enterprise is an investment in maritime defence vessels, maintenance, and ship building locations by the Australian government. The current the prospected investment is approximately $168 to $183 billion. The program, including the 2017 Naval Shipbuilding Plan and the 2020 Force Structure Plan outlines a framework to technologically equip, fiscally sustain and develop capabilities for current and future Australian Naval Operations.

==== Plan Galileo ====
Plan Galileo was launched in April 2020. The plan aims to sustain and improve upon the available resources of Regional Maintenance Centres (RMCs). The sites of these centres include Perth, Darwin, Cairns and Sydney: centres which provide logistical support and physical harbour space for existing RAN vessels including the currently operating Armidale-class patrol boat groups.

== Organisation ==
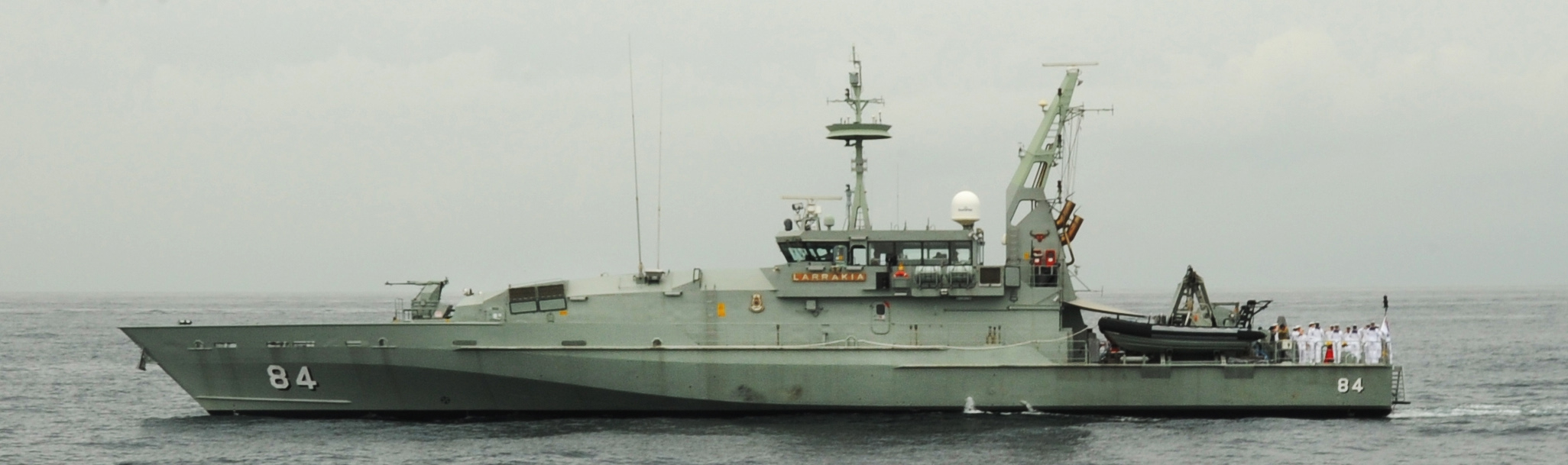
HMAS Larrakia in 2015

On introduction of the Armidale class, the Australian Patrol Boat Group was reorganised into four divisions, named after Attack-class ships:

- 1st/Attack Division (HMAS Coonawarra, Darwin)
  - Six Armidale-class patrol boat crews (Attack 1–6)
- 2nd/Assail Division (HMAS Coonawarra)
  - Six Armidale-class patrol boat crews (Assail 1–6)
- 3rd/Ardent Division (HMAS Cairns, Cairns)
  - Six Armidale-class patrol boat crews (Ardent 1-6)
- 4th/Aware Division (Dampier, Western Australia)
  - Three Armidale-class patrol boat crews (Aware 1-3) (based in Darwin)

In 2016 the Patrol Boat force was reorganised to allocate a single crew to each platform

- HMAS Coonawarra, Darwin
  - HMAS Armidale
  - HMAS Larrakia
  - HMAS Bathurst
  - HMAS Albany
  - HMAS Broome
  - HMAS Childers
  - HMAS Launceston
  - HMAS Maryborough
- HMAS Cairns, Cairns
  - ADV Cape Inscription
  - ADV Cape Fourcroy
  - ADV Cape Otway
  - ADV Cape Peron
- Decommissioned
  - HMAS Bundaberg (2014)
  - HMAS Pirie (2021)
  - HMAS Maitland (2022)
  - HMAS Ararat (2022)
  - HMAS Glenelg (2022)
  - HMAS Wollongong (2022)
