= HMAS Wollongong (ACPB 92) =

Armidale-class patrol boat

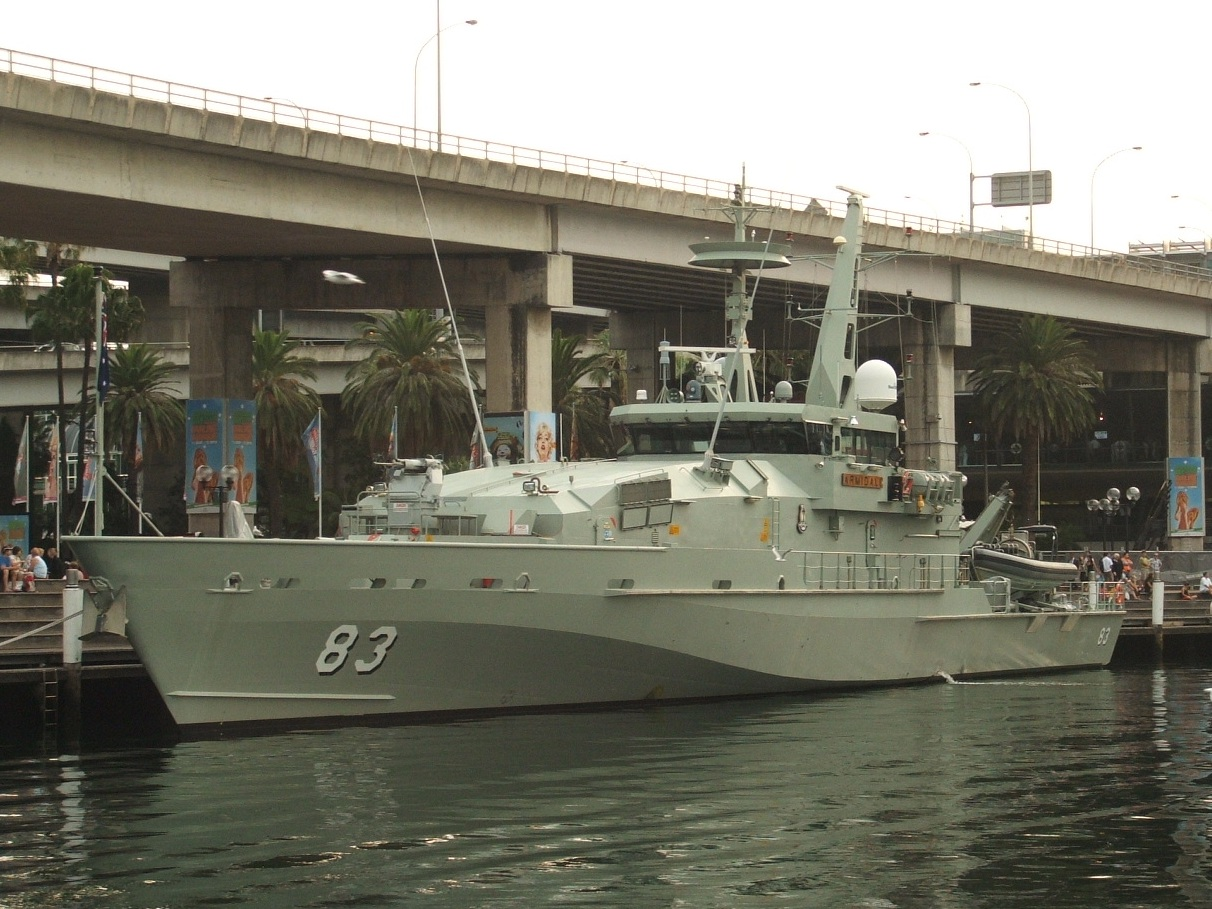
- HMAS Armidale, a sister ship to HMAS Wollongong

History

Australia
- Namesake: City of Wollongong
- Builder: Austal, Henderson, Western Australia
- Commissioned: 23 June 2007
- Decommissioned: 8 December 2022
- Home port: HMAS Cairns, Cairns
- Identification: MMSI number: 503210000; Callsign: VKPM
- Motto: "Heed The Call"
- Honours and awards: Six inherited battle honours
- Status: Awaiting disposal
- Badge

General characteristics
- Class & type: Armidale-class patrol boat
- Displacement: 300 tons standard load
- Length: 56.8 m (186 ft)
- Beam: 9.7 m (32 ft)
- Draught: 2.7 m (8.9 ft)
- Propulsion: 2 × MTU 4000 16V 6,225 horsepower (4,642 kW) diesels driving twin propellers
- Speed: 25 knots (46 km/h; 29 mph)
- Range: 3,000 nautical miles (5,600 km; 3,500 mi) at 12 knots (22 km/h; 14 mph)
- Endurance: 21 days standard, 42 days maximum
- Boats & landing craft carried: 2 × Zodiac 7.2 m (24 ft) RHIBs
- Complement: 21 standard, 29 maximum
- Sensors & processing systems: Bridgemaster E surface search/navigation radar
- Electronic warfare & decoys: Prism III radar warning system; Toplite electro-optical detection system; Warrlock direction finding system
- Armament: 1 × Rafael Typhoon stabilised gun mount fitted with a 25 mm (1 in) M242 Bushmaster autocannon; 2 × 12.7 mm (0.5 in) machine guns

HMAS Wollongong (ACPB 92), named for the city of Wollongong, was an Armidale-class patrol boat of the Royal Australian Navy (RAN).

== Design and construction ==
The Armidale class patrol boats are 56.8 metres (186 ft) long, with a beam of 9.7 metres (32 ft), a draught of 2.7 metres (8 ft 10 in), and a standard displacement of 270 tons. The semi-displacement vee hull is fabricated from aluminium alloy, and each vessel is built to a combination of Det Norske Veritas standards for high-speed light craft and RAN requirements. The Armidales can travel at a maximum speed of 25 knots (46 km/h; 29 mph), and are driven by two propeller shafts, each connected to an MTU 16V M70 diesel. The ships have a range of 3,000 nautical miles (5,600 km; 3,500 mi) at 12 knots (22 km/h; 14 mph), allowing them to patrol the waters around the distant territories of Australia, and are designed for standard patrols of 21 days, with a maximum endurance of 42 days.

The main armament of the Armidale class is a Rafael Typhoon stabilised 25-millimetre (0.98 in) gun mount fitted with an M242 Bushmaster autocannon. Two 12.7-millimetre (0.50 in) machine guns are also carried. Boarding operations are performed by two 7.2-metre (24 ft), waterjet propelled rigid-hulled inflatable boats (RHIBs), named Wolf and Hawk. Each RHIB is stored in a dedicated cradle and davit, and is capable of operating independently from the patrol boat as it carries its own communications, navigation, and safety equipment.

Each patrol boat has a standard ship's company of 21 personnel, with a maximum of 29. The Armidales do not have a permanently assigned ship's company; instead, they are assigned to divisions at a ratio of two vessels to three companies, which rotate through the vessels and allow the Armidales to spend more time at sea, without compromising sailors' rest time or training requirements. A 20-berth auxiliary accommodation compartment was included in the design for the transportation of soldiers, illegal fishermen, or unauthorised arrivals; in the latter two cases, the compartment could be secured from the outside. However, a malfunction in the sewerage treatment facilities aboard HMAS Maitland in August 2006 pumped hydrogen sulphide and carbon monoxide into the compartment, non-fatally poisoning four sailors working inside, after which use of the compartment for accommodation was banned across the class.

Wollongong was constructed by Austal in Henderson, Western Australia. Wollongong was commissioned into the RAN at Fleet Base East in Sydney on 23 June 2007.

== Operational history ==
Operationally, Wollongong has spent the majority of her career on border patrol to Australia's north and north-west. The ship is assigned to Ardent Division of the Australian Patrol Boat Group, is based in Cairns, and performs border protection and fisheries protection patrols.

In July 2007, the ship became the first vessel of her class to visit the port of Brisbane, Queensland.

Following a request from the Make-A-Wish Foundation, Wollongong was 'commanded' for a day in January 2008 by an 11-year-old.

In June 2012, Wollongong was one of several ships to respond to a Suspected Illegal Entry Vessel which sank with 206 passengers while en route to Australia. The patrol boat transported the 109 survivors found during the initial rescue operation to immigrant processing facilities at Christmas Island.
