= HMAS Bundaberg =

Two ships of the Royal Australian Navy have been named HMAS Bundaberg, after the city of Bundaberg, Queensland.

- HMAS Bundaberg (J231), a Bathurst-class corvette launched in 1941 and decommissioned in 1946
- HMAS Bundaberg (ACPB 91), an Armidale-class patrol boat commissioned in 2007 and decommissioned in 2014 after being destroyed by fire

== Battle honours ==
Two battle honours have been awarded to ships named HMAS Bundaberg:

- Pacific 1942–45
- New Guinea 1943–44
