= HMAS Bundaberg (ACPB 91) =

Armidale-class patrol boat

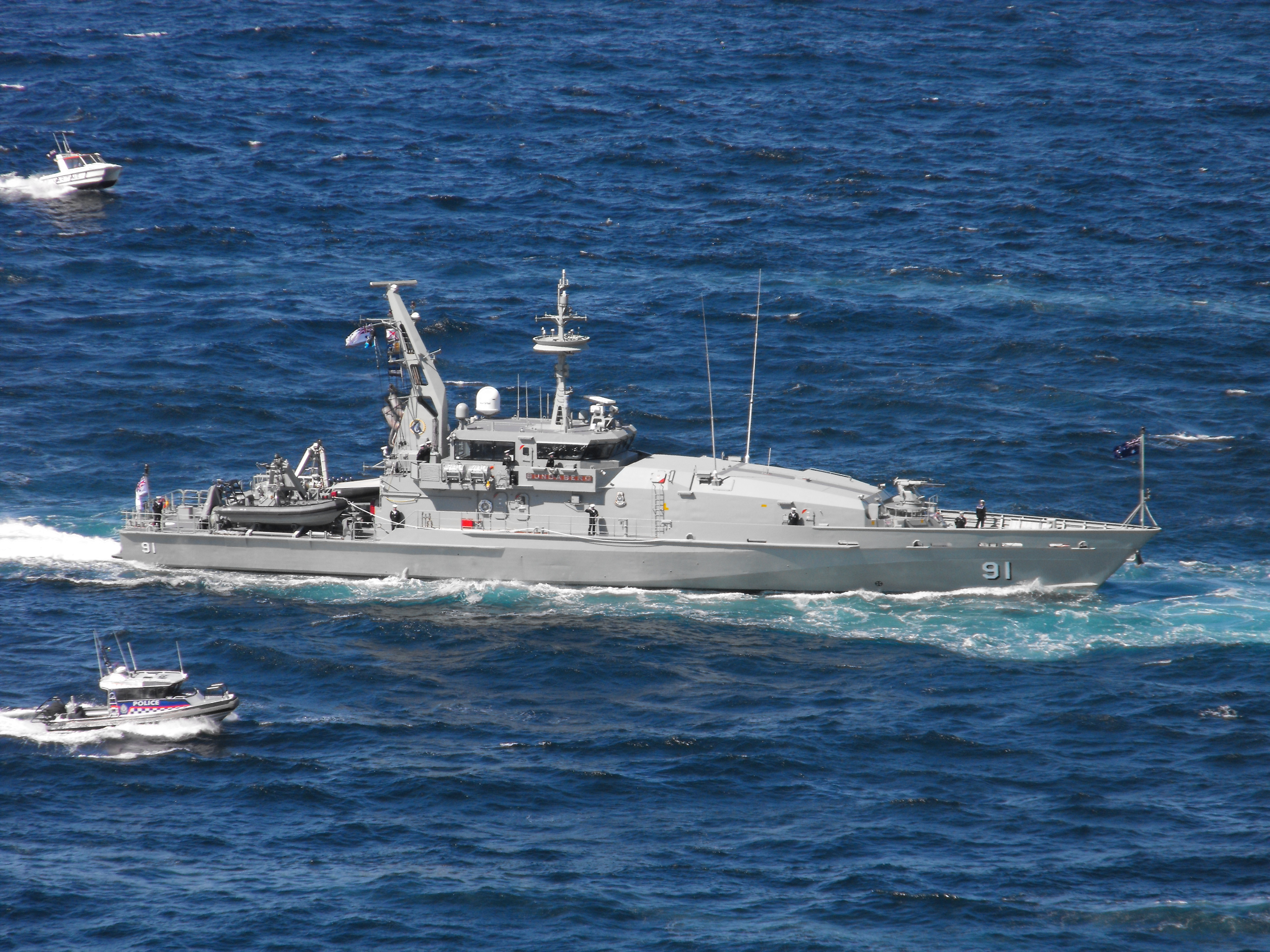
- Bundaberg in 2013

History

Australia
- Namesake: City of Bundaberg
- Builder: Austal, Henderson, Western Australia
- Commissioned: 3 March 2007
- Decommissioned: 18 December 2014
- Home port: HMAS Cairns, Cairns
- Identification: MMSI number: 503203000; Callsign: VKPJ
- Motto: "Cut And Slash"
- Honours and awards: Two inherited battle honours
- Badge

General characteristics
- Class & type: Armidale class patrol boat
- Displacement: 300 tons standard load
- Length: 56.8 m (186 ft)
- Beam: 9.7 m (32 ft)
- Draught: 2.7 m (8.9 ft)
- Propulsion: 2 × MTU 4000 16V 6,225 horsepower (4,642 kW) diesels driving twin propellers
- Speed: 25 knots (46 km/h; 29 mph)
- Range: 3,000 nautical miles (5,600 km; 3,500 mi) at 12 knots (22 km/h; 14 mph)
- Endurance: 21 days standard, 42 days maximum
- Boats & landing craft carried: 2 × Zodiac 7.2 m (24 ft) RHIBs
- Complement: 21 standard, 29 maximum
- Sensors & processing systems: Bridgemaster E surface search/navigation radar
- Electronic warfare & decoys: Prism III radar warning system; Toplite electro-optical detection system; Warrlock direction finding system
- Armament: 1 × Rafael Typhoon stabilised gun mount fitted with a 25 mm (1 in) M242 Bushmaster autocannon; 2 × 12.7 mm (0.5 in) machine guns

HMAS Bundaberg (ACPB 91), named after the city of Bundaberg, was an Armidale class patrol boat of the Royal Australian Navy (RAN). The ship was built in Henderson, Western Australia, and was commissioned into the RAN in March 2007. Based at HMAS Cairns, Bundaberg spent much of her career deployed as part of border protection and fisheries protection patrols as part of Operation Resolute. In addition, the patrol boat was involved in several national and multinational training exercises, visited Vanuatu in 2011 (the vessel's only overseas deployment), tracked a suspected drug-smuggling vessel that led to a multimillion-dollar seizure, and participated in the International Fleet Review 2013. In August 2014, a large fire broke out on the ship while she was undergoing refit. Extensive damage from the fire led to the ship's decommissioning in December 2014.

== Design and construction ==
The Armidale class patrol boats are 56.8 metres (186 ft) long, with a beam of 9.7 metres (32 ft), a draught of 2.7 metres (8 ft 10 in), and a standard displacement of 270 tons. The semi-displacement vee hull is fabricated from aluminium alloy, and each vessel is built to a combination of Det Norske Veritas standards for high-speed light craft and RAN requirements. The Armidales can travel at a maximum speed of 25 knots (46 km/h; 29 mph), and are driven by two propeller shafts, each connected to an MTU 16V M70 diesel. The ships have a range of 3,000 nautical miles (5,600 km; 3,500 mi) at 12 knots (22 km/h; 14 mph), allowing them to patrol the waters around the distant territories of Australia, and are designed for standard patrols of 21 days, with a maximum endurance of 42 days.

The main armament of the Armidale class is a Rafael Typhoon stabilised 25-millimetre (0.98 in) gun mount fitted with an M242 Bushmaster cannon. Two 12.7-millimetre (0.50 in) machine guns are also carried. Boarding operations are performed by two 7.2-metre (24 ft), waterjet propelled rigid-hulled inflatable boats (RHIBs). Each RHIB is stored in a dedicated cradle and davit, and is capable of operating independently from the patrol boat as it carries its own communications, navigation, and safety equipment.

Each patrol boat has a standard ship's company of 21 personnel, with a maximum of 29. The Armidales do not have a permanently assigned ship's company; instead, they are assigned to divisions at a ratio of two vessels to three companies, which rotate through the vessels and allow the Armidales to spend more time at sea, without compromising sailors' rest time or training requirements. A 20-berth auxiliary accommodation compartment was included in the design for the transportation of soldiers, illegal fishermen, or unauthorised arrivals; in the latter two cases, the compartment could be secured from the outside. However, a malfunction in the sewerage treatment facilities aboard HMAS Maitland in August 2006 pumped hydrogen sulfide and carbon monoxide into the compartment, non-fatally poisoning four sailors working inside, after which use of the compartment for accommodation was banned across the class.

Bundaberg was constructed by Austal in Henderson, Western Australia. She was commissioned into the RAN in her namesake city on 3 March 2007.

== Operational history ==
The ship was assigned to Ardent Division, based at HMAS Cairns in Cairns, Queensland, and performed border protection and fisheries protection patrols. After commissioning and a schedule of work-up exercises, she was deployed as part of Operation Resolute for the first time in April 2007. Regular deployments as part of Operation Resolute made up the bulk of the patrol boat's operations during her career.

Bundaberg took part in Exercise Talisman Sabre during June 2007. After the exercise, the first boarding of an illegal foreign fishing vessel was made by Bundaberg's personnel. In July, the ship's company participated in the City of Bundaberg's Bundy In Bloom festival, and were granted the keys to the city. In October, the ship rescued the crew of a capsized yacht off Mindil Beach, Northern Territory. On 4 January 2008, Bundaberg was forced to sail from Darwin to avoid being caught in confined waters by Cyclone Helen.

During May and June 2010, Bundaberg was temporarily removed from Operation Resolute to participate in a Minor War Vessel Concentration Period, before visiting Bundaberg and the Gold Coast. In November, the patrol boat was part of the annual Australia - Papua New Guinea Exercise Paradise. On 4 December, the ship was undergoing routine maintenance in Darwin when a fire started in a storeroom on board. There were no injuries, but damage to Bundaberg kept her out of operation until mid-April 2011. Shortly after returning to service, Bundaberg sailed overseas for the first and only time: a four-day visit to Port Vila, Vanuatu, which saw the patrol boat leave Cairns on 28 April 2011, and return on 8 May. In October, Bundaberg tracked the yacht Friday Freedom as part of an Australian Customs and Australian Federal Police (AFP) anti-smuggling operation. The yacht was detained by the AFP on arrival in Bundaberg, with 300 kilograms (660 lb) of cocaine and A$3 million in cash seized in Australia's fifth-largest drug bust.

In November 2012, Bundaberg was a part of Exercise Paradise/Triton Thunder. On 22 September, Bundaberg sailed from Cairns to Sydney, escorting four Pacific-class patrol boats which were to participate in the International Fleet Review 2013. Bundaberg was also a participant in the review: on 4 October, she was part of the 100th anniversary re-enactment of the RAN's first fleet entry into Sydney Harbour, then on 5 November, sailed into Sydney Harbour again as part of Review Line 2 for the fleet review itself.

== Fire ==
During August 2014, the patrol boat was undergoing refit work at Aluminium Boats Australia (ABA), a civilian shipyard in Hemmant, Brisbane. Before midday on 11 August 2014, a large fire broke out aboard, starting in a forward interior section and moving aft. The Queensland Fire & Emergency Services (QFES) were alerted at 11:52, but it was not until 17:00 that the fire was extinguished, and over the course of the afternoon, 15 fire appliances and over 60 firefighters attended the scene. Two civilian contractors were treated for smoke inhalation, and no other injuries were reported. Financial difficulties following the fire (including the loss of the naval repair contract, the cost of investigating the fire, and industry-wide pressure from imports of foreign-built vessels) culminated in ABA being placed into voluntary administration on 4 November 2014. As of 5 November 2014, no cause for the fire had been identified, although the QFES speculated at the time of the incident that repair work was responsible.

The ship was extensively damaged in the blaze. Following a survey of the ship it was declared to be a constructive total loss. Bundaberg was ceremonially decommissioned on 18 December 2014 at the naval base HMAS Cairns, with the patrol boat's ensign lowered for the final time from the base's flagstaff.
