= HMAS Larrakia (ACPB 84) =

Armidale-class patrol boat

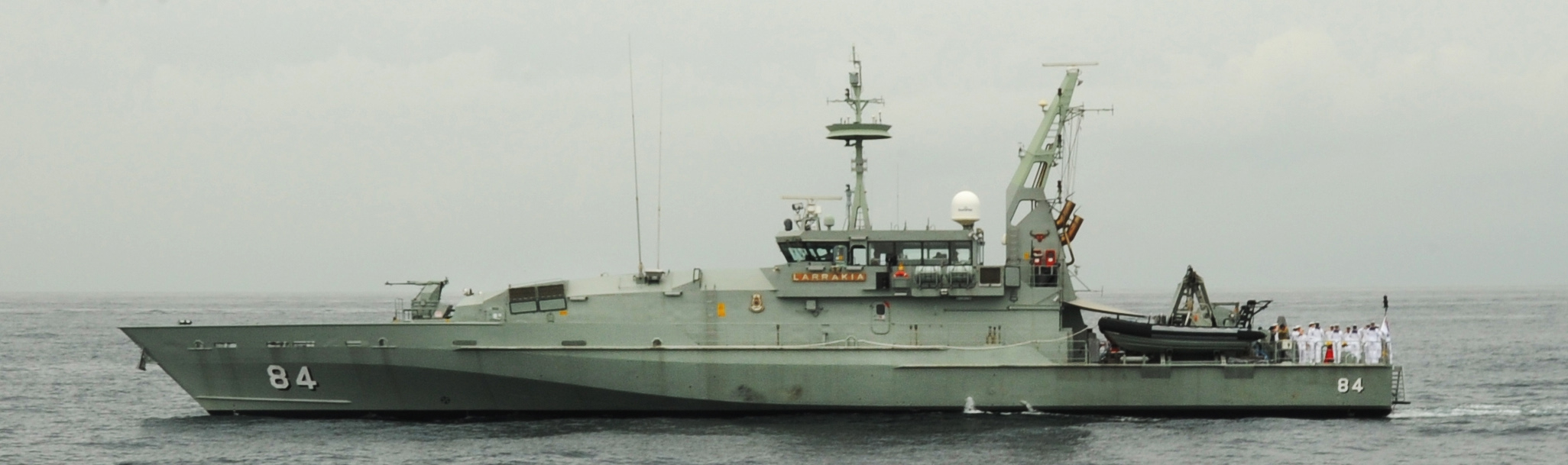
- HMAS Larrakia (ACPB 84) in March 2015

History

Australia
- Namesake: The Larrakia Aborigines
- Builder: Austal, Henderson, Western Australia
- Commissioned: 10 February 2006
- Decommissioned: 23 September 2023
- Home port: HMAS Coonawarra, Darwin
- Identification: MMSI number: 503209000; Callsign: VKCW
- Motto: "United As One"
- Honours and awards: One inherited battle honour
- Status: Decommissioned
- Badge

General characteristics
- Class & type: Armidale-class patrol boat
- Displacement: 300 tons standard load
- Length: 56.8 m (186 ft)
- Beam: 9.7 m (32 ft)
- Draught: 2.7 m (8.9 ft)
- Propulsion: 2 × MTU 4000 16V 6,225 horsepower (4,642 kW) diesels driving twin propellers
- Speed: 25 knots (46 km/h; 29 mph)
- Range: 3,000 nautical miles (5,600 km; 3,500 mi) at 12 knots (22 km/h; 14 mph)
- Endurance: 21 days standard, 42 days maximum
- Boats & landing craft carried: 2 × Zodiac 7.2 m (24 ft) RHIBs
- Complement: 21 standard, 29 maximum
- Sensors & processing systems: Bridgemaster E surface search/navigation radar
- Electronic warfare & decoys: Prism III radar warning system; Toplite electro-optical detection system; Warrlock direction finding system
- Armament: 1 × Rafael Typhoon stabilised gun mount fitted with a 25 mm (1 in) M242 Bushmaster autocannon; 2 × 12.7 mm (0.5 in) machine guns

HMAS Larrakia (ACPB 84) is an Armidale-class patrol boat of the Royal Australian Navy (RAN).

== Design and construction ==
The Armidale-class patrol boats are 56.8 metres (186 ft) long, with a beam of 9.7 metres (32 ft), a draught of 2.7 metres (8 ft 10 in), and a standard displacement of 270 tons. The semi-displacement vee hull is fabricated from aluminium alloy, and each vessel is built to a combination of Det Norske Veritas standards for high-speed light craft and RAN requirements. The Armidales can travel at a maximum speed of 25 knots (46 km/h; 29 mph), and are driven by two propeller shafts, each connected to an MTU 16V M70 diesel. The ships have a range of 3,000 nautical miles (5,600 km; 3,500 mi) at 12 knots (22 km/h; 14 mph), allowing them to patrol the waters around the distant territories of Australia, and are designed for standard patrols of 21 days, with a maximum endurance of 42 days.

The main armament of the Armidale class is a Rafael Typhoon stabilised 25-millimetre (0.98 in) gun mount fitted with an M242 Bushmaster autocannon. Two 12.7-millimetre (0.50 in) machine guns are also carried. Boarding operations are performed by two 7.2-metre (24 ft), waterjet propelled rigid-hulled inflatable boats (RHIBs). Each RHIB is stored in a dedicated cradle and davit, and is capable of operating independently from the patrol boat as it carries its own communications, navigation, and safety equipment.

Each patrol boat has a standard ship's company of 21 personnel, with a maximum of 29. The Armidales do not have a permanently assigned ship's company; instead, they are assigned to divisions at a ratio of two vessels to three companies, which rotate through the vessels and allow the Armidales to spend more time at sea, without compromising sailors' rest time or training requirements. A 20-berth auxiliary accommodation compartment was included in the design for the transportation of soldiers, illegal fishermen, or unauthorised arrivals; in the latter two cases, the compartment could be secured from the outside. However, a malfunction in the sewerage treatment facilities aboard HMAS Maitland in August 2006 pumped hydrogen sulphide and carbon monoxide into the compartment, non-fatally poisoning four sailors working inside, after which use of the compartment for accommodation was banned across the class.

Larrakia was constructed by Austal in Henderson, Western Australia. She was commissioned into the RAN in Darwin, Northern Territory on 10 February 2006. Larrakia is named after the Larrakia Aboriginal peoples, and is the only Armidale not to be named after a regional city.

== Operational history ==
Larrakia is assigned to Attack Division, is based in Darwin, and performs border protection and fisheries protection patrols.

This vessel participated in Exercises Triton Thunder and Cassowary during May 2012. Larrakia operated off Dundee Beach in Darwin in concert with units from the Indonesian Navy and RAN Fleet Air Arm.

In June 2012, Larrakia was one of several ships to respond to a Suspected Illegal Entry Vessel which sank with 206 passengers while en route to Australia. The patrol boat served as the coordinating platform for the search-and-rescue operation.
