= HMAS Broome =

Two vessels of the Royal Australian Navy have been named HMAS Broome, for the town of Broome, Western Australia.

- HMAS Broome (J191), a Bathurst-class corvette which operated from 1942 until 1946, when she was sold to the Turkish Navy
- HMAS Broome (ACPB 90), an Armidale-class patrol boat that entered service in 2007 and is active as of 2022

== Battle honours ==
Two battle honours were awarded to the first HMAS Broome; these are inherited by subsequent ships of the name:

- Pacific 1942–45
- New Guinea 1942–44

== See also ==
- USS Broome (DD-210), a destroyer of the United States Navy
