= HMAS Broome (ACPB 90) =

Armidale-class patrol boat

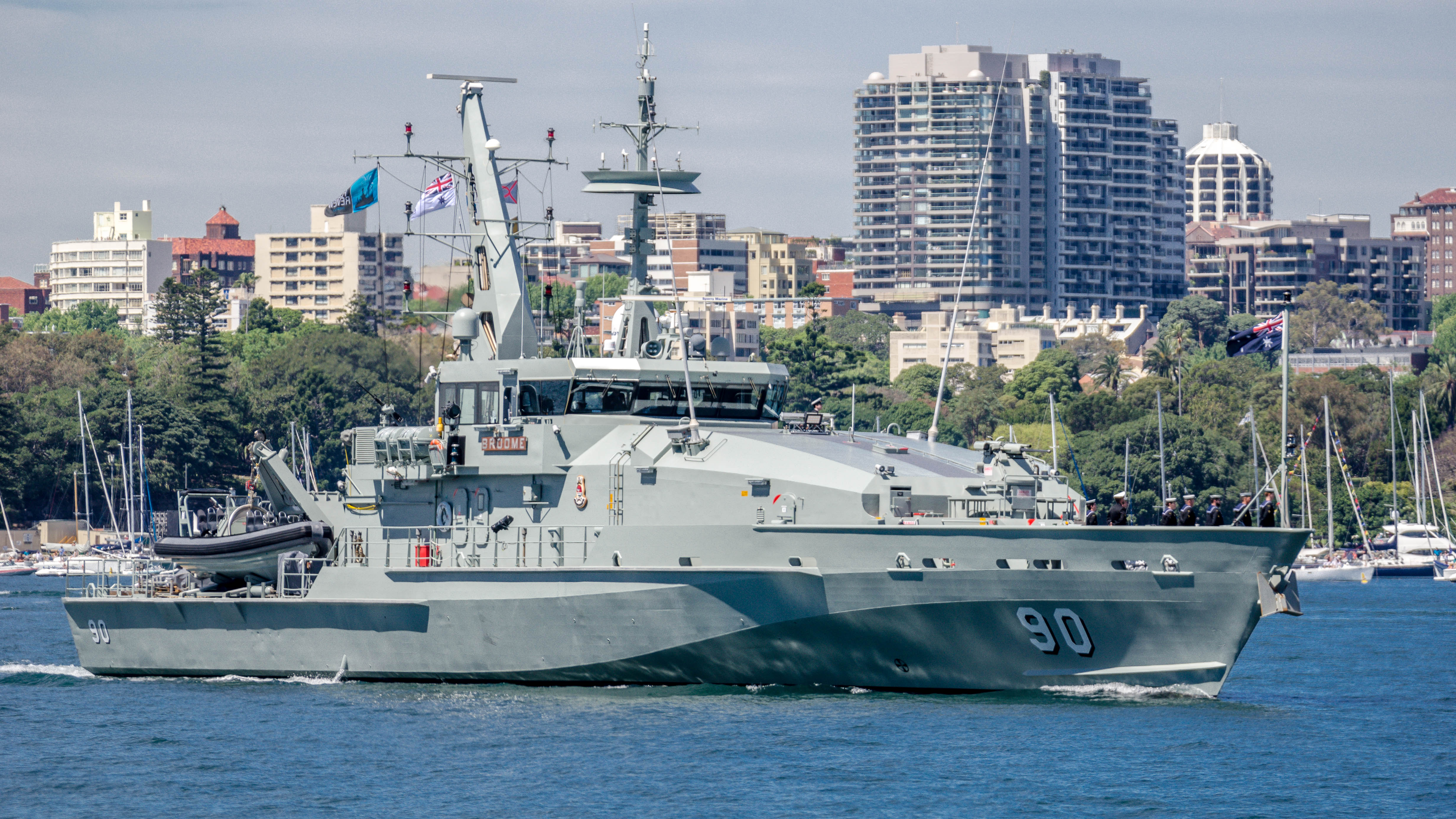
- HMAS Broome during the International Fleet Review 2013

History

Australia
- Namesake: City of Broome, Western Australia
- Builder: Austal, Henderson, Western Australia
- Commissioned: 10 February 2007
- Decommissioned: 29 August 2024
- Home port: HMAS Coonawarra, Darwin
- Identification: MMSI number: 503212000; Callsign: VKPH
- Motto: "Fight and Endure"
- Honours and awards: Two inherited battle honours
- Status: Decommissioned

General characteristics
- Class & type: Armidale-class patrol boat
- Displacement: 300 tons standard load
- Length: 56.8 m (186 ft)
- Beam: 9.7 m (32 ft)
- Draught: 2.7 m (8.9 ft)
- Propulsion: 2 × MTU 4000 16V 6,225 horsepower (4,642 kW) diesels driving twin propellers
- Speed: 25 knots (46 km/h; 29 mph)
- Range: 3,000 nautical miles (5,600 km; 3,500 mi) at 12 knots (22 km/h; 14 mph)
- Endurance: 21 days standard, 42 days maximum
- Boats & landing craft carried: 2 × Zodiac 7.2 m (24 ft) RHIBs
- Complement: 21 standard, 29 maximum
- Sensors & processing systems: Bridgemaster E surface search/navigation radar
- Electronic warfare & decoys: Prism III radar warning system; Toplite electro-optical detection system; Warrlock direction finding system
- Armament: 1 × Rafael Typhoon stabilised gun mount fitted with a 25 mm (1 in) M242 Bushmaster autocannon; 2 × 12.7 mm (0.5 in) machine guns

HMAS Broome (ACPB 90), named for the city of Broome, Western Australia, was an Armidale-class patrol boat of the Royal Australian Navy (RAN).

== Design and construction ==
The Armidale-class patrol boats are 56.8 metres (186 ft) long, with a beam of 9.7 metres (32 ft), a draught of 2.7 metres (8 ft 10 in), and a standard displacement of 270 tons. The semi-displacement vee hull is fabricated from aluminium alloy, and each vessel is built to a combination of Det Norske Veritas standards for high-speed light craft and RAN requirements. The Armidales can travel at a maximum speed of 25 knots (46 km/h; 29 mph), and are driven by two propeller shafts, each connected to an MTU 16V M70 diesel. The ships have a range of 3,000 nautical miles (5,600 km; 3,500 mi) at 12 knots (22 km/h; 14 mph), allowing them to patrol the waters around the distant territories of Australia, and are designed for standard patrols of 21 days, with a maximum endurance of 42 days.

The main armament of the Armidale class is a Rafael Typhoon stabilised 25-millimetre (0.98 in) gun mount fitted with an M242 Bushmaster autocannon. Two 12.7-millimetre (0.50 in) machine guns are also carried. Boarding operations are performed by two 7.2-metre (24 ft), waterjet propelled rigid-hulled inflatable boats (RHIBs). Each RHIB is stored in a dedicated cradle and davit, and is capable of operating independently of the patrol boat as it carries its own communications, navigation, and safety equipment.

Each patrol boat has a standard ship's company of 21 personnel, with a maximum of 29. The Armidales do not have a permanently assigned ship's company; instead, they are assigned to divisions at a ratio of two vessels to three companies, which rotate through the vessels and allow the Armidales to spend more time at sea, without compromising sailors' rest time or training requirements. A 20-berth auxiliary accommodation compartment was included in the design for the transportation of soldiers, illegal fishermen, or unauthorized arrivals; in the latter two cases, the compartment could be secured from the outside. However, a malfunction in the sewerage treatment facilities aboard HMAS Maitland in August 2006 pumped hydrogen sulfide and carbon monoxide into the compartment, non-fatally poisoning four sailors working inside, after which use of the compartment for accommodation was banned across the class.

Broome was constructed by Austal in Henderson, Western Australia. She was commissioned into the RAN in 2007.

== Operational history ==
Broome is assigned to Assail Division, is based in Darwin and performs border protection and fisheries protection patrols.

During 2008, Broome was one of two ships conflated to represent the fictional patrol boat HMAS Hammersley in the second season of Australian drama series Sea Patrol. 42 of the 86 days of filming occurred aboard Broome, with sister ship HMAS Launceston later used for pick-up filming.

In May 2010, she sailed to Kupang, Indonesia, to take part in a bilateral naval exercise. In July 2010, boarding procedures were demonstrated to Prime Minister Julia Gillard onboard Broome.

In October 2013, Broome participated in the International Fleet Review 2013 in Sydney.
