= HMAS Ararat (ACPB 89) =

Patrol boat of Royal Australian Navy

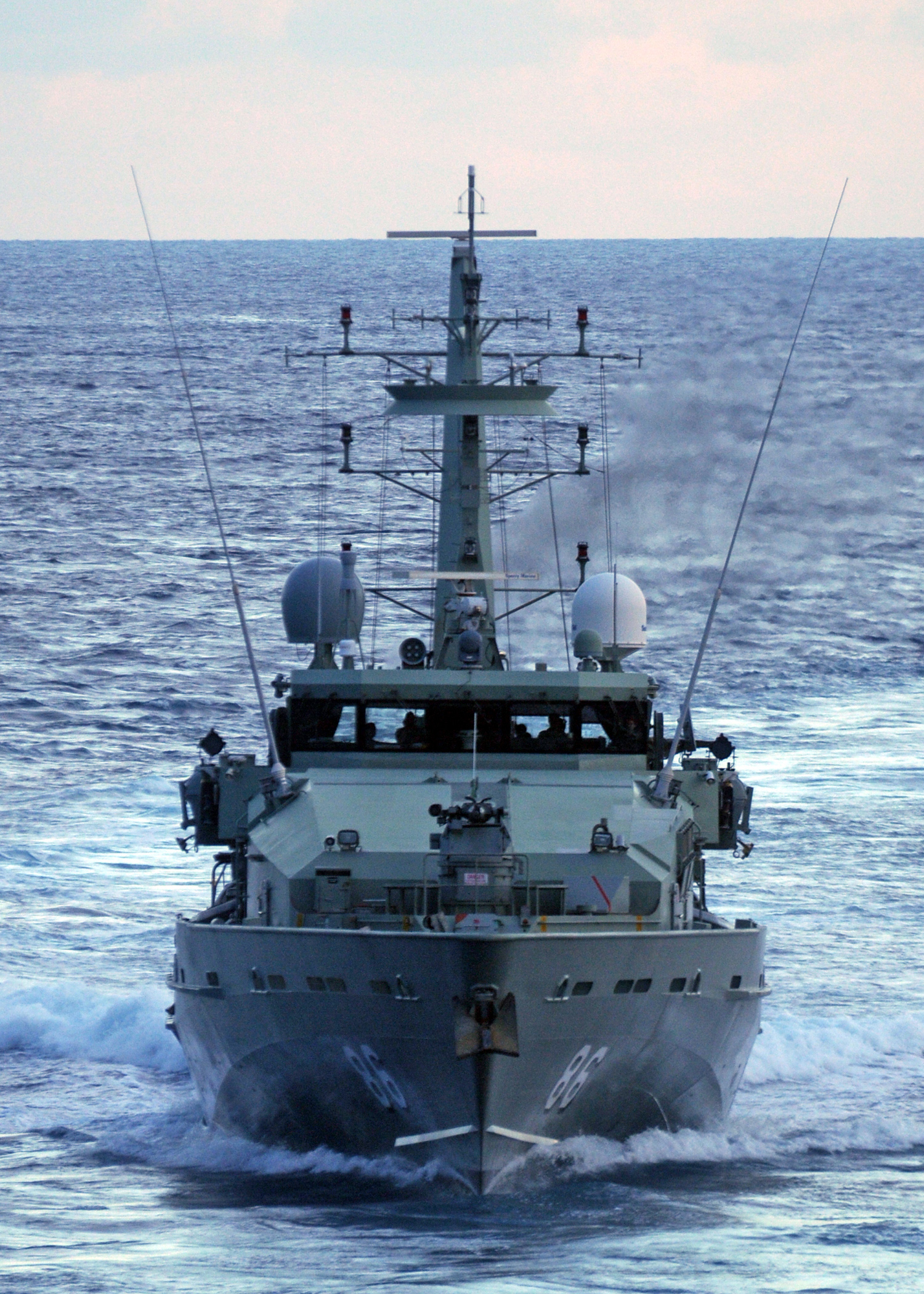
- HMAS Albany, a sister ship to HMAS Ararat, in the Timor Sea in 2012

History

Australia
- Namesake: Town of Ararat, Victoria
- Builder: Austal, Henderson, Western Australia
- Launched: 6 May 2006
- Commissioned: 10 November 2006
- Decommissioned: 2 July 2022
- Home port: HMAS Coonawarra, Darwin
- Identification: MMSI number: 503207000; Callsign: VKMY
- Motto: "Strength Through Effort"
- Honours and awards: Two inherited battle honours

General characteristics
- Class & type: Armidale-class patrol boat
- Displacement: 300 tons standard load
- Length: 56.8 m (186 ft)
- Beam: 9.7 m (32 ft)
- Draught: 2.7 m (8.9 ft)
- Propulsion: 2 × MTU 4000 16V 6,225 horsepower (4,642 kW) diesels driving twin propellers
- Speed: 25 knots (46 km/h; 29 mph)
- Range: 3,000 nautical miles (5,600 km; 3,500 mi) at 12 knots (22 km/h; 14 mph)
- Endurance: 21 days standard, 42 days maximum
- Boats & landing craft carried: 2 × Zodiac 7.2 m (24 ft) RHIBs
- Complement: 21 standard, 29 maximum
- Sensors & processing systems: Bridgemaster E surface search/navigation radar
- Electronic warfare & decoys: Prism III radar warning system; Toplite electro-optical detection system; Warrlock direction finding system
- Armament: 1 × Rafael Typhoon stabilised gun mount fitted with a 25 mm (1 in) M242 Bushmaster autocannon; 2 × 12.7 mm (0.5 in) machine guns

HMAS Ararat (ACPB 89), named for the town of Ararat, Victoria, was an Armidale-class patrol boat of the Royal Australian Navy (RAN).

== Design and construction ==
The Armidale-class patrol boats are 56.8 metres (186 ft) long, with a beam of 9.7 metres (32 ft), a draught of 2.7 metres (8 ft 10 in), and a standard displacement of 270 tons. The semi-displacement vee hull is fabricated from aluminium alloy, and each vessel is built to a combination of Det Norske Veritas standards for high-speed light craft and RAN requirements. The Armidales can travel at a maximum speed of 25 knots (46 km/h; 29 mph), and are driven by two propeller shafts, each connected to an MTU 16V M70 diesel. The ships have a range of 3,000 nautical miles (5,600 km; 3,500 mi) at 12 knots (22 km/h; 14 mph), allowing them to patrol the waters around the distant territories of Australia, and are designed for standard patrols of 21 days, with a maximum endurance of 42 days.

The main armament of the Armidale class is a Rafael Typhoon stabilised 25-millimetre (0.98 in) gun mount fitted with an M242 Bushmaster autocannon. Two 12.7-millimetre (0.50 in) machine guns are also carried. Boarding operations are performed by two 7.2-metre (24 ft), waterjet propelled rigid-hulled inflatable boats (RHIBs). Each RHIB is stored in a dedicated cradle and davit, and is capable of operating independently from the patrol boat as it carries its own communications, navigation, and safety equipment.

Each patrol boat has a standard ship's company of 21 personnel, with a maximum of 29. A 20-berth auxiliary accommodation compartment was included in the design for the transportation of soldiers, illegal fishermen, or unauthorised arrivals; in the latter two cases, the compartment could be secured from the outside. However, a malfunction in the sewerage treatment facilities aboard HMAS Maitland in August 2006 pumped hydrogen sulphide and carbon monoxide into the compartment, non-fatally poisoning four sailors working inside, after which use of the compartment for accommodation was banned across the class.

Ararat was constructed by Austal in Henderson, Western Australia. She was commissioned into the RAN in Melbourne on 10 November 2006.

== Operational history ==
Ararat was assigned to Assail Division, is based in Darwin, and performed border protection and fisheries protection patrols.

This vessel participated in Exercises Triton Thunder and Cassowary during May 2012. Ararat operated off Dundee Beach in Darwin in concert with units from the Indonesian Navy and the RAN Fleet Air Arm.

The ship was decommissioned at HMAS Coonawarra on 2 July 2022.
