= HMAS Larrakia =

Two ships of the Royal Australian Navy have been named HMAS Larrakia, after the Larrakia Aborigines:

- HMAS Larrakia, an air-sea rescue and patrol vessel operated during World War II
- HMAS Larrakia (ACPB 84), an Armidale-class patrol boat commissioned in 2006 and operational as of 2016

== Battle honours ==
Ships named HMAS Larrakia are entitled to carry a single battle honour:

- Darwin 1942–43
