= HMAS Maryborough (ACPB 95) =

Armidale-class patrol boat of the Royal Australian Navy

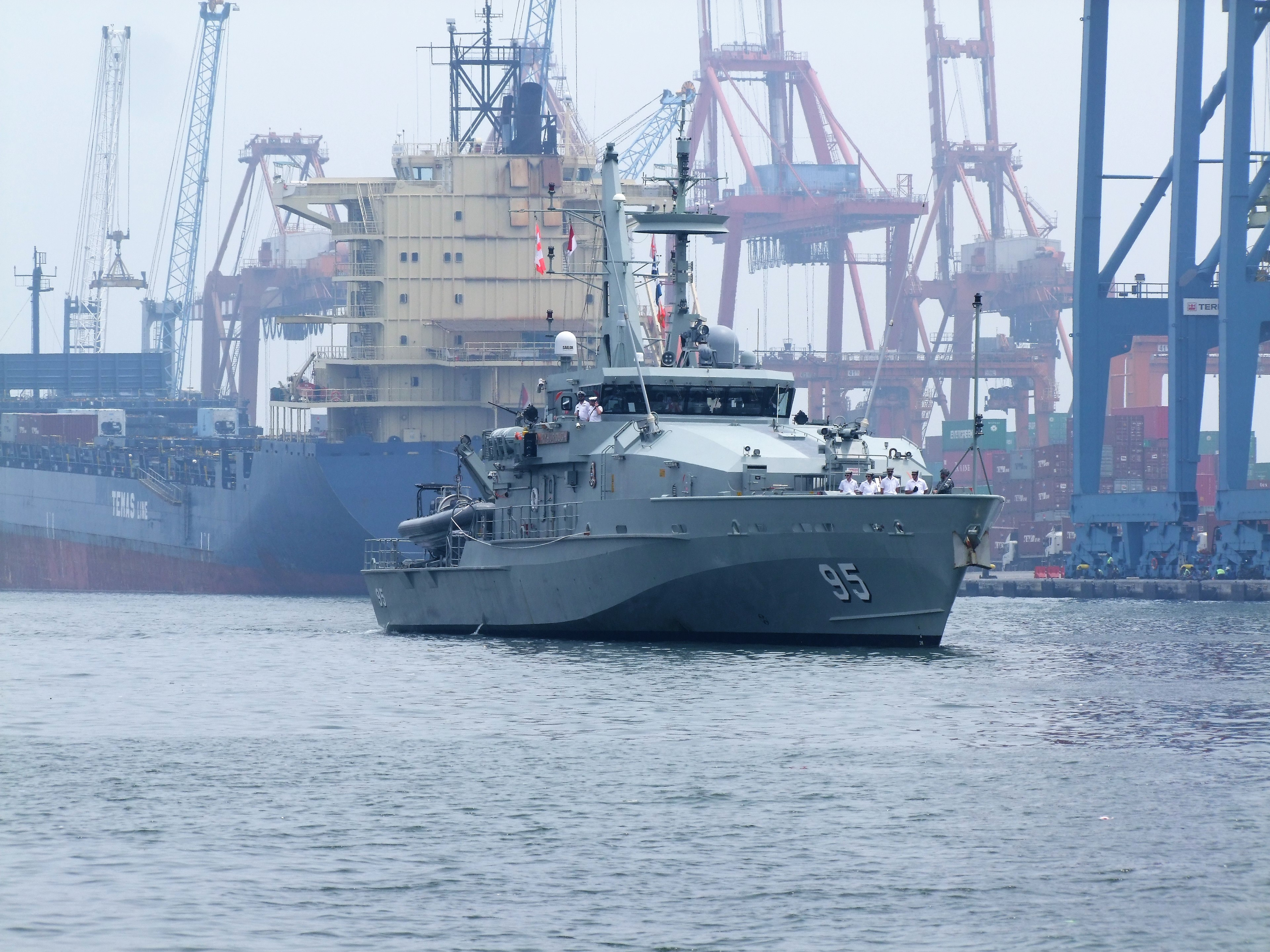
- HMAS Maryborough arriving at Jakarta in 2017

History

Australia
- Namesake: City of Maryborough, Queensland
- Commissioned: 8 December 2008
- Decommissioned: 23 September 2023
- Home port: HMAS Coonawarra, Darwin
- Motto: "Strength and Courage"
- Honours and awards: Three inherited battle honours
- Status: Decommissioned
- Badge

General characteristics
- Class & type: Armidale-class patrol boat
- Displacement: 300 tons standard load
- Length: 56.8 m (186 ft)
- Beam: 9.7 m (32 ft)
- Draught: 2.7 m (8.9 ft)
- Propulsion: 2 × MTU 4000 16V 6,225 horsepower (4,642 kW) diesels driving twin propellers
- Speed: 25 knots (46 km/h; 29 mph)
- Range: 3,000 nautical miles (5,600 km; 3,500 mi) at 12 knots (22 km/h; 14 mph)
- Endurance: 21 days standard, 42 days maximum
- Boats & landing craft carried: 2 × Zodiac 7.2 m (24 ft) RHIBs
- Complement: 21 standard, 29 maximum
- Sensors & processing systems: Bridgemaster E surface search/navigation radar
- Electronic warfare & decoys: Prism III radar warning system; Toplite electro-optical detection system; Warrlock direction finding system
- Armament: 1 × Rafael Typhoon stabilised gun mount fitted with a 25 mm (1 in) M242 Bushmaster autocannon; 2 × 12.7 mm (0.5 in) machine guns

HMAS Maryborough (ACPB 95), named after the city of Maryborough, Queensland, is one of fourteen Armidale-class patrol boats operated by the Royal Australian Navy (RAN).

== Design and construction ==
The Armidale-class patrol boats are 56.8 metres (186 ft) long, with a beam of 9.7 metres (32 ft), a draught of 2.7 metres (8 ft 10 in), and a standard displacement of 270 tons. The semi-displacement vee hull is fabricated from aluminium alloy, and each vessel is built to a combination of Det Norske Veritas standards for high-speed light craft and RAN requirements. The Armidales can travel at a maximum speed of 25 knots (46 km/h; 29 mph), and are driven by two propeller shafts, each connected to an MTU 16V M70 diesel. The ships have a range of 3,000 nautical miles (5,600 km; 3,500 mi) at 12 knots (22 km/h; 14 mph), allowing them to patrol the waters around the distant territories of Australia, and are designed for standard patrols of 21 days, with a maximum endurance of 42 days.

The main armament of the Armidale class is a Rafael Typhoon stabilised 25-millimetre (0.98 in) gun mount fitted with an M242 Bushmaster autocannon. Two 12.7-millimetre (0.50 in) machine guns are also carried. Boarding operations are performed by two 7.2-metre (24 ft), waterjet propelled rigid-hulled inflatable boats (RHIBs). Each RHIB is stored in a dedicated cradle and davit, and is capable of operating independently from the patrol boat as it carries its own communications, navigation, and safety equipment.

Each patrol boat has a standard ship's company of 21 personnel, with a maximum of 29. The Armidales do not have a permanently assigned ship's company; instead, they are assigned to divisions at a ratio of two vessels to three companies, which rotate through the vessels and allow the Armidales to spend more time at sea, without compromising sailors' rest time or training requirements. A 20-berth auxiliary accommodation compartment was included in the design for the transportation of soldiers, illegal fishermen, or unauthorised arrivals; in the latter two cases, the compartment could be secured from the outside. However, a malfunction in the sewerage treatment facilities aboard HMAS Maitland in August 2006 pumped hydrogen sulphide and carbon monoxide into the compartment, non-fatally poisoning four sailors working inside, after which use of the compartment for accommodation was banned across the class.

Maryborough was one of two patrol boats ordered in 2005, following a 2004 federal election promise that the Coalition would provide a dedicated patrol force for the oil and gas producing facilities located off the north-west coast of Australia. Maryborough was constructed by Austal at their shipyard in Henderson, Western Australia. She was commissioned into the RAN in Brisbane on 8 December 2007.

== Operational history ==
In December 2019 the Maryborough left Darwin, for Honiara, the capital of the Solomon Islands, accompanied by the newly commissioned Solomon Islands patrol vessel RSIPV Gizo. The vessels engaged in joint training exercises. Now it is decommissioned as of 23 September 2023. It was given a farewell to its crew in Maryborough with a 'Freedom of Entry Parade'.

== Fire ==
On 26 May 2017 Maryborough suffered from an Engine Room fire while at sea operating North-West of Darwin. No crew members were injured and the ship returned to Darwin for an assessment of the damage.
