= HMAS Glenelg =

Two ships of the Royal Australian Navy have been named HMAS Glenelg, after the city of Glenelg, South Australia:

- HMAS Glenelg (J236), a Bathurst-class corvette commissioned in 1942, decommissioned in 1946, and sold for scrap in 1957
- HMAS Glenelg (ACPB 96), an Armidale-class patrol boat commissioned in 2008, and active as of 2016

== Battle honours ==
Ships named HMAS Glenelg are entitled to carry two battle honours:

- Pacific 1942–45
- New Guinea 1943–44
