= HMAS Maryborough =

Two ships of the Royal Australian Navy (RAN) have been named HMAS Maryborough, after the city of Maryborough, Queensland

- HMAS Maryborough (J195), a Bathurst-class corvette commissioned in 1941, decommissioned in 1945, and sold into private ownership in 1947
- HMAS Maryborough (ACPB 95), an Armidale-class patrol boat commissioned in 2007 and active as of 2016

== Battle honours ==
Ships named HMAS Maryborough are entitled to carry three battle honours:

- Pacific 1942
- Indian Ocean 1942–44
- Sicily 1943
