= Armidale-class patrol boat =

Class of patrol boats built for the Royal Australian Navy

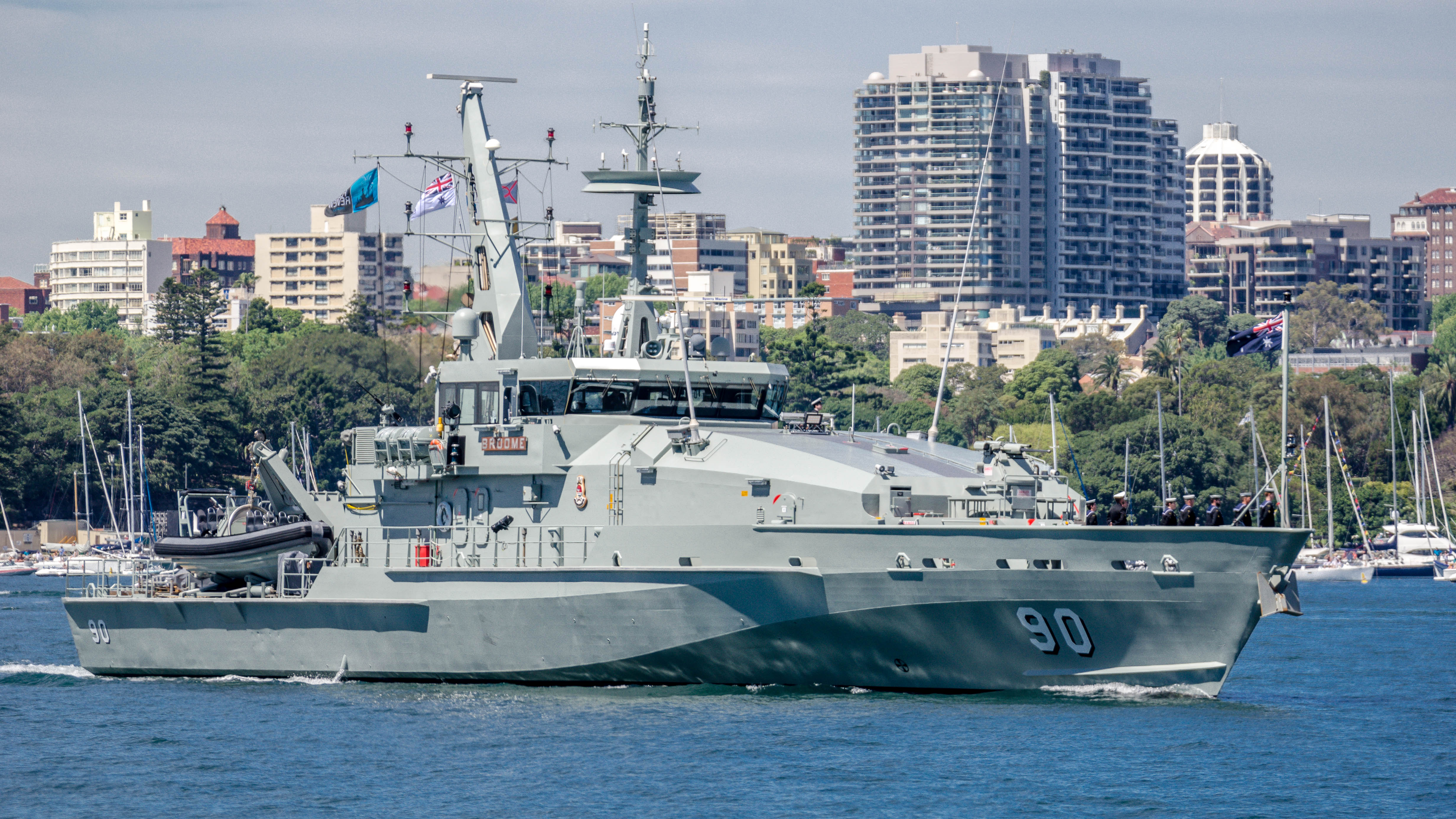
- HMAS Broome

Class overview
- Name: Armidale class
- Builders: Austal
- Operators: Royal Australian Navy
- Preceded by: Fremantle class
- Succeeded by: Arafura class and Cape class
- Cost: A$24–28 million per ship.
- Built: 2004–2007
- In commission: 2005–2025
- Completed: 14
- Lost: 1
- Retired: 13

General characteristics
- Type: Patrol boat
- Displacement: 300 tons standard load
- Length: 56.8 m (186 ft 4 in)
- Beam: 9.7 m (31 ft 10 in)
- Draught: 2.7 m (8 ft 10 in)
- Propulsion: 2 × MTU 4000 16V 6,225 hp (4,642 kW) diesels driving twin propellers
- Speed: 25 knots (46 km/h; 29 mph)
- Range: 3,000 nmi (5,600 km; 3,500 mi) at 12 knots (22 km/h; 14 mph)
- Endurance: 21 days standard, 42 days maximum
- Boats & landing craft carried: 2 × Zodiac 7.2 m (24 ft) RHIBs
- Complement: 21 crew standard, 29 crew maximum, maximum 150 persons onboard
- Sensors & processing systems: Bridgemaster E surface search/navigation radar
- Electronic warfare & decoys: Prism III radar warning system; Toplite electro-optical detection system; Warrlock direction finding system
- Armament: 1 × Rafael Typhoon stabilised gun mount fitted with a Mk 38 25 mm (1 in) M242 Bushmaster autocannon; 2 × 12.7 mm (0.5 in) machine guns

The Armidale class was a class of patrol boats built for the Royal Australian Navy (RAN). Planning for a class of vessels to replace the fifteen Fremantle-class patrol boats began in 1993 as a joint project with the Royal Malaysian Navy, but was cancelled when Malaysia pulled out of the process. The project was reopened in 1999 under the designation SEA 1444, with the RAN as the sole participant. Of the seven proposals tendered, the Austal/Defence Maritime Services (DMS) proposal for twelve vessels based on an enlarged Bay-class patrol boat was selected. Two additional boats were ordered in 2005 to provide a dedicated patrol force for the North West Shelf Venture.

All fourteen vessels were constructed by Austal at Henderson, Western Australia. The first vessel, HMAS Armidale, was commissioned into the RAN in June 2005, and the last, HMAS Glenelg, entered service in February 2008. The Armidale-class ships were operated by the Australian Patrol Boat Group, and based in Cairns and Darwin. They were primarily tasked with border protection, fisheries patrols, and the interception of unauthorised arrivals by sea. The Armidales were longer and heavier than their Fremantle-class predecessors, with improved seakeeping ability and increased range, allowing them to reach Australia's offshore territories.

During their early service life, there were problems with the fuel systems across the class, and a 20-bunk auxiliary accommodation compartment has been banned from use after toxic fumes were found in the compartment on multiple occasions. The high operational tempo from the Operation Resolute and Operation Sovereign Borders border protection and asylum seeker interception operations, combined with design flaws and poor maintenance, resulted in the ships suffering from hull fracturing around the engineering spaces, mechanical defects, and corrosion issues. DMS's contract to provide in-service support was terminated in 2017, and the patrol boats underwent a major refit in Singapore to reinforce the hull. Two Cape-class patrol boats have been chartered to supplement naval patrol boat availability during the refit cycle, and plans to replace the Armidales with an enlarged class of offshore combatant vessel have been accelerated to bring them into service by the early 2020s.

After extensive damage from an onboard fire, HMAS Bundaberg was decommissioned at the end of 2014. A fictional Armidale-class boat, HMAS Hammersley, appears in the Australian military drama series Sea Patrol from the second season onwards, with filming occurring aboard multiple ships of the class. The last three boats were decommissioned in December 2025.

== Development and tendering ==
Planning for the Armidale class began in 1993, as a plan to replace the Fremantle class, which was due for retirement in 1998. This evolved into a joint program with Malaysia to construct an offshore patrol craft. When Malaysia pulled out, the plan was scrapped, and the Fremantles underwent a life-extending refit. The cost of maintaining the ageing vessels prompted the Department of Defence to create the Replacement Patrol Boat program, which received the procurement project designation SEA 1444.

SEA 1444 marked several departures from the department's standard acquisition requirements. Instead of specifying a number of vessels, the coverage of 3,000 ship-days per year (with 1,800 to be spent on border protection operations, and a surge capability of 3,600 days) was given, with the producer to determine how many ships were needed to meet this. The ships had to meet specific performance parameters, such as the ability to conduct boarding operations in conditions up to Sea State 4, and to maintain surveillance capability up to Sea State 5. The producer was also required in the contract to provide support and maintenance for the ships, for fifteen years after construction completed.

Nine companies expressed interest in the project; of these, seven had the required capability to build the ships. These seven were narrowed down to three based on each tender's merit, competitiveness with the other tenders, and successful meeting of Australian industry involvement targets for both construction and long-term support. Austal and Defence Maritime Services (DMS) partnered to offer twelve ships based on an expanded version of the latter's Bay-class patrol boat, in use with the Australian Customs Service. The companies submitted two proposals for a 56-metre (184 ft) vessel, one with a steel hull, and one with an aluminium hull; the latter offering a 21% reduction in fuel consumption. Australian Defence Industries (ADI) tendered a design based on the Royal Danish Navy's Flyvefisken-class patrol vessel. The vessel was to be built with a glass-reinforced plastic hull, similar to ADI's Huon-class minehunters. The Tenix proposal was a variant of a 56-metre (184 ft) search and rescue vessel constructed for the Philippine Coast Guard. The tender was awarded to the Austal/DMS partnership in December 2003. The contract was valued at $553 million, with each ship costing between $24 million and $28 million to construct.

During the 2004 federal election, the Howard government promised to acquire two more patrol boats to provide a dedicated patrol force for the North West Shelf Venture located off the north-west coast of Australia. These were ordered in 2005. The order was placed in June 2006.

== Design and construction ==
All fourteen boats were constructed by Austal at its shipyard in Henderson, Western Australia. Lead ship HMAS Armidale was commissioned into the RAN in June 2005. Two other patrol boats were delivered to the RAN in 2005, six in 2006, and five in 2007, with the final ship in the class, HMAS Glenelg, delivered in October 2007 and commissioned in February 2008. At one stage, six vessels were being constructed simultaneously.

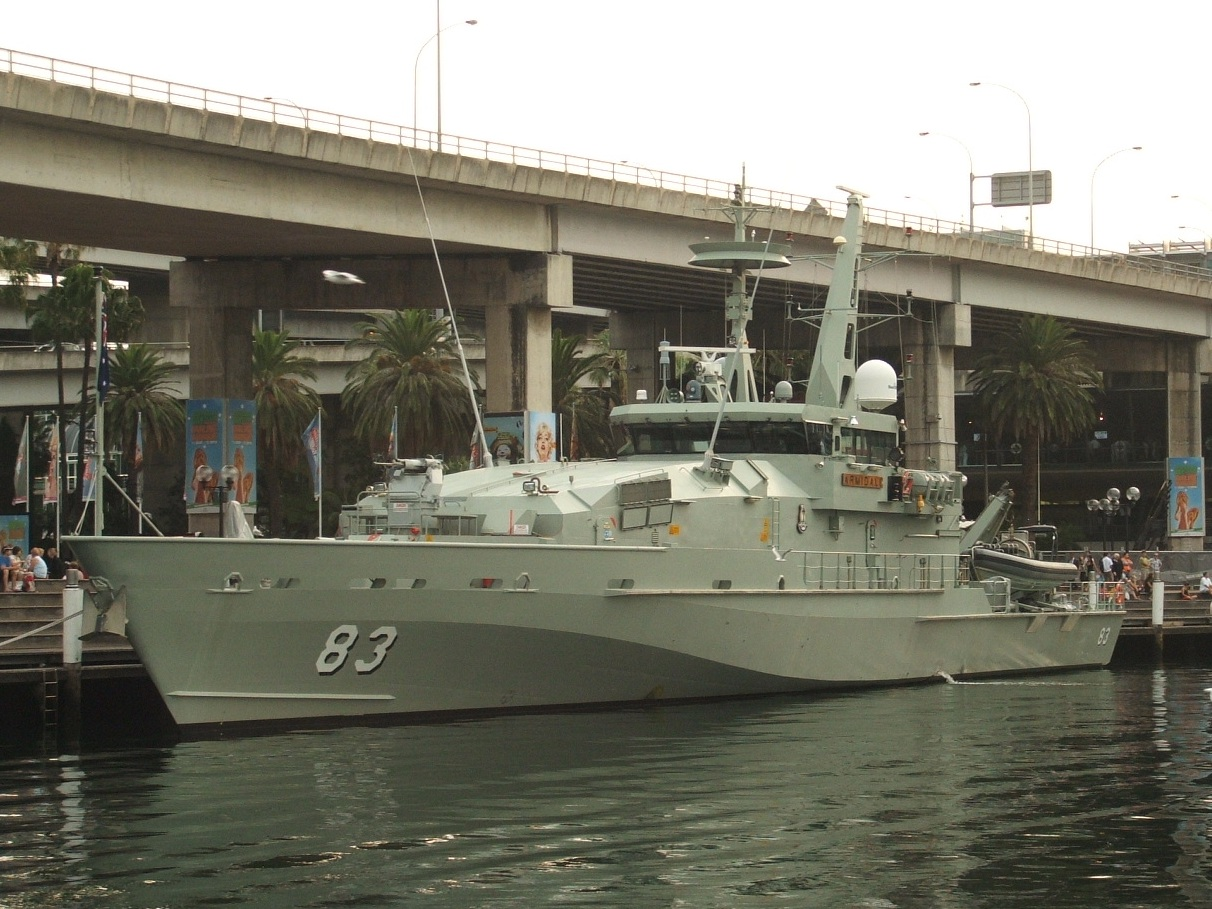
HMAS Armidale, lead ship of the class, at Darling Harbour in January 2008

Each patrol boat has a length of 56.8 metres (186 ft), a beam of 9.7 metres (32 ft), a draught of 2.7 metres (8.9 ft), and a standard displacement of 300 tons. The hull is of the semi-displacement vee type, and is fabricated from aluminum alloy. The ship is designed to a combination of Det Norske Veritas standards for high-speed light craft and RAN requirements: much effort went into avoiding attempts to overengineer the Armidales or turn them into 'miniature warships'.

The Armidales can travel at a maximum speed of 25 knots (46 km/h; 29 mph), and are driven by two propeller shafts, each connected to an MTU 4000 16V diesel engine, providing 6,225 horsepower (4,642 kW). The ships have a range of 3,000 nautical miles (5,600 km; 3,500 mi) at 12 knots (22 km/h; 14 mph), allowing them to patrol the waters around the distant territories of Australia, including the Cocos (Keeling) Islands and Christmas Island. The Armidale class has demonstrated an improved seakeeping ability over the preceding Fremantle class: the Armidales are 15 metres (49 ft) longer, 85 tons heavier, and have hydraulic stabiliser fins and trim tabs incorporated into the design, allowing them to survive conditions up to Sea State 9. The vessels are designed for standard patrols of 21 days, with a maximum endurance of 42 days.

=== Weapons and systems ===
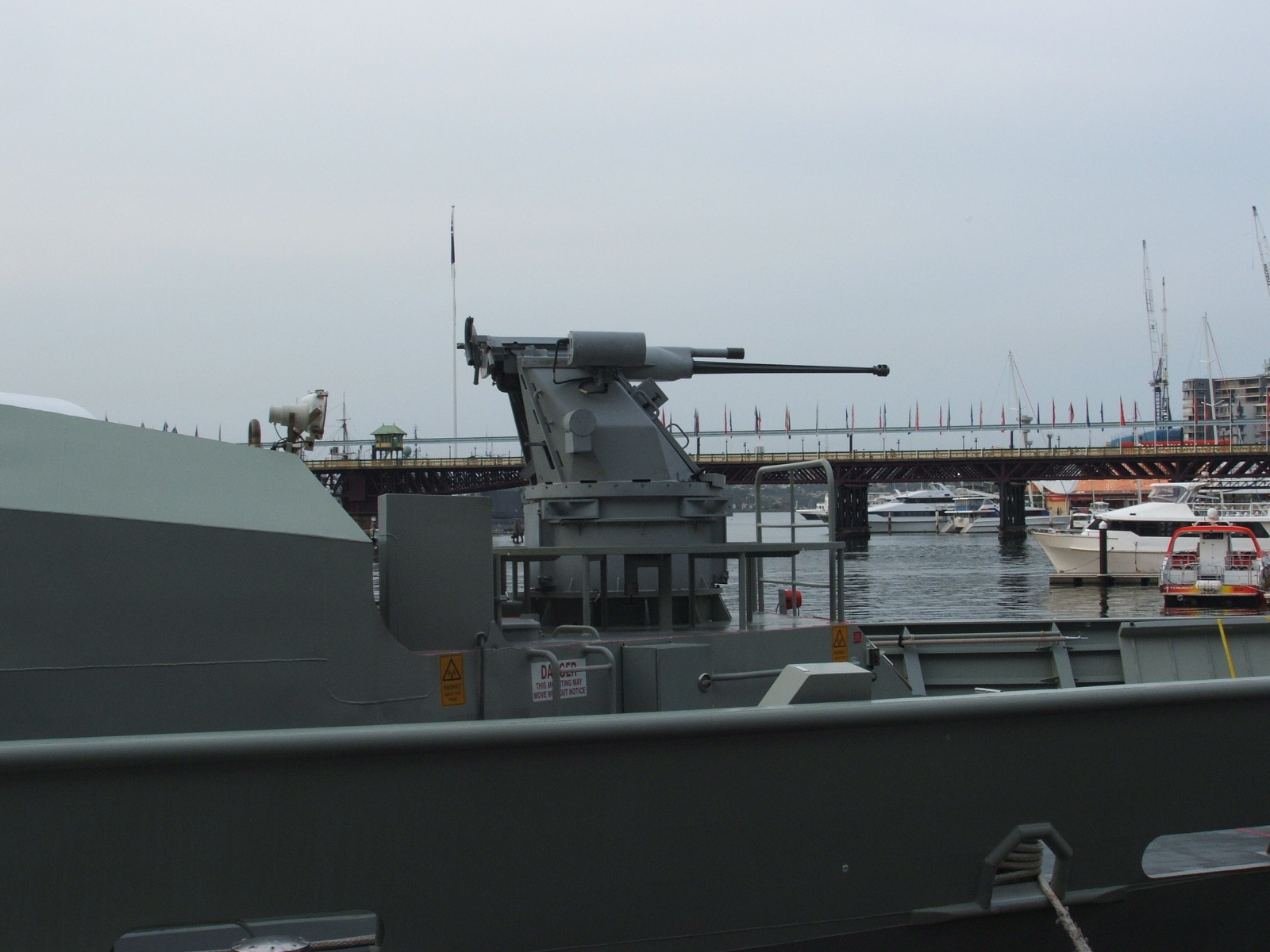
The main gun aboard HMAS Armidale

The main armament of the Armidale class is a Rafael Typhoon stabilised 25-millimetre (0.98 in) gun mount fitted with an M242 Bushmaster autocannon. This cannon has a rate of fire of 200 rounds per minute, and is controlled remotely from the bridge. Two 12.7-millimetre (0.50 in) machine guns are also carried.

Boarding operations are performed by two 7.2-metre (24 ft), waterjet propelled rigid-hulled inflatable boats (RHIB), which carry ten people (a fully equipped, eight-strong boarding party, and two boat crew). The RHIBs are larger and more powerful than the single RHIB aboard a Fremantle, are capable of operating independently of their mothership, and carry their own communications, navigation, and safety equipment. Each RHIB has a dedicated cradle and davit, the boats can be launched and recovered easily, and a centralised 'dressing room' incorporated into the ship's design has streamlined the deployment and return of personnel.

The patrol boats are fitted with a Bridgemaster E surface search and navigational radar, a Toplite electro-optical detection system, and a Warrlock direction finding system. A Prism III radar warning system was fitted to the last two boats during construction, and retro-fitted to the rest. Tenders for a Naval Unmanned Aerial System (NUAS) capability for the Armidale class were requested in mid-2014.

=== Complement ===
Each patrol boat has a standard ship's company of 21 personnel, with a maximum of 29 (not including use of the austere compartment). Unlike the Fremantle-class patrol boats, the Armidales do not have a permanently assigned ship's company. Instead, there are 21 crews established for the 14 Armidale-class patrol boats, which are divided up into four divisions: Attack, Assail, Ardent, and Aware. The first three of the Divisions are assigned six crews for four ships, while Aware has three crews for two ships. The ships are continually manned, with two out of three crews actively deployed while the third undergoes leave or training, or prepares to transfer into a ship: a handover can be accomplished in less than six hours. The intention of multi-crewing is to allow the ships to spend more time at sea, without compromising sailors' rest time or training requirements.

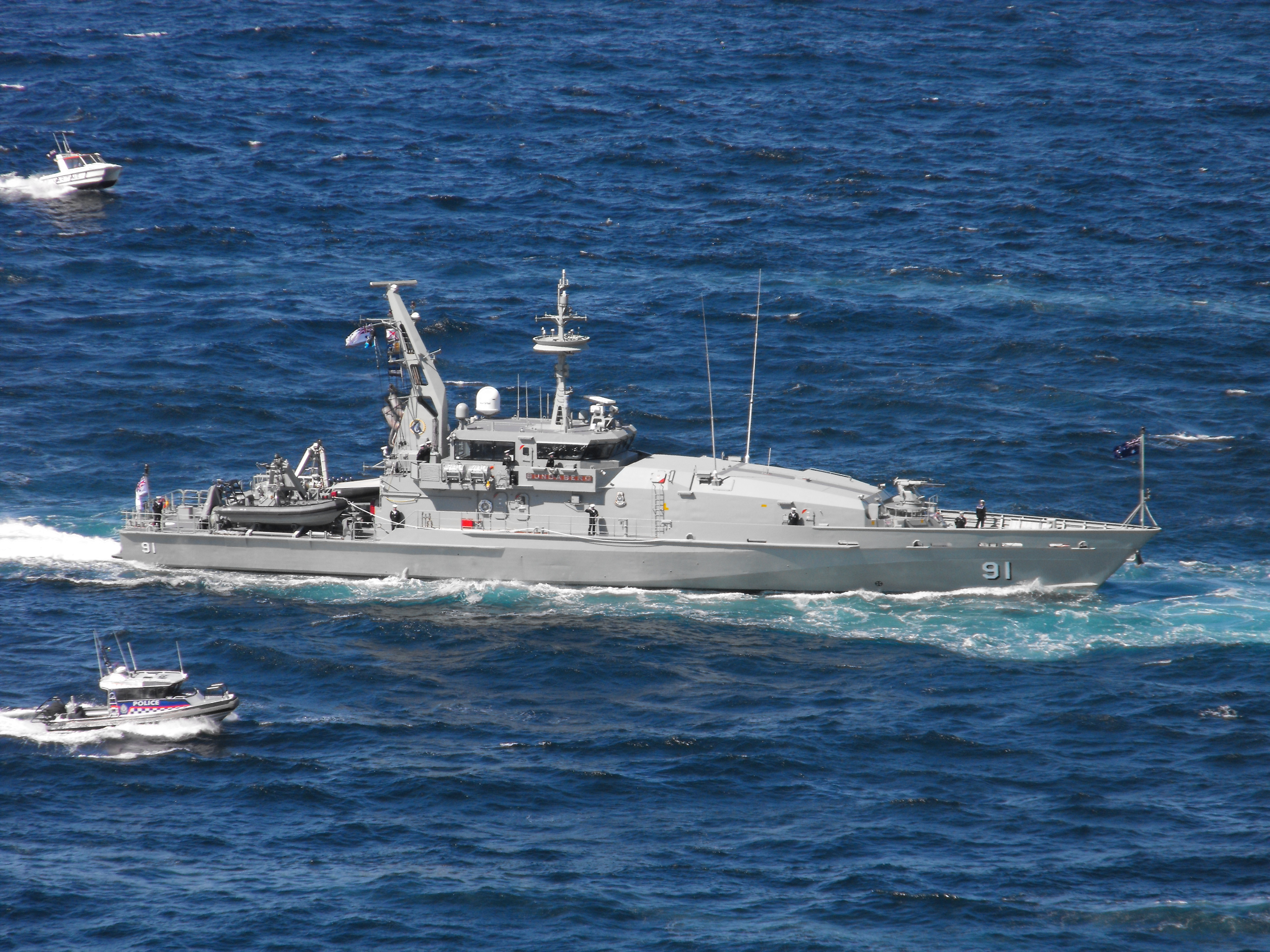
HMAS Bundaberg entering Sydney Harbour in October 2013

Junior sailors are housed in four-berth cabins, as opposed to the central sixteen-berth mess deck of the Fremantles, while senior sailors and commissioned officers either have individual or share two-berth cabins. Personnel have access to e-mail and satellite television, and the galley is better equipped than that on a Fremantle-class vessel and better suited to use in heavy seas. The comfort of personnel is also significantly improved over the Fremantles, with air conditioning throughout the entire ship (excluding engine and machinery compartments).

=== Problems ===
The introduction of the class into service has not been without problems. Since June 2005, all active Armidales have undergone operating restrictions on two occasions, both due to water contamination of the main fuel systems. The first occurrence, in September 2006, led to the suspension of operations by the patrol boats for a month, and the engineering controls were redesigned. The problem occurred again in January 2007, and led to an 'operational pause' while Austal redesigned the fuel system, engineering procedures were altered, and fuel quality criteria were tightened. The five ships yet to be completed were fitted with the modified fuel system during construction, while the active ships were refitted over the course of 2007. As of December 2007, no further fuel problems have occurred.

A 20-berth auxiliary accommodation compartment (the 'austere' compartment) was included in the design, for the transportation of soldiers, illegal fishermen, or unauthorised arrivals; in the latter two cases, the compartment could be secured from the outside. However, a malfunction in the sewage treatment facilities aboard HMAS Maitland in August 2006 pumped hydrogen sulphide and carbon monoxide into the compartment, non-fatally poisoning four sailors working inside resulting in use of the compartment as accommodation being heavily restricted across the class. In 2010, allegations were made to The Australian that a sailor working in the austere compartment on a different vessel had been gassed with hydrogen sulphide, and carbon monoxide was regularly detected in the enclosed space. Following publication of the allegations, Chief of Navy Russ Crane claimed that there was no record of the alleged gassing incident, and while there were ongoing incidents of poisonous gasses detected in the compartment, the sensors were set to trigger well below dangerous levels, and modifications were being made to the sewerage and ventilation systems.

In 2014, the navy reported the recurrence of hull cracking around the engine spaces, which has been attributed to a combination of design issues related to the aluminium hull, and the high tempo of operations. By 2015, several patrol boats were confined to port because of structural, mechanical, and corrosion issues. In response, the Department of Defence threatened to cancel DMS' maintenance contract based on the company's poor performance in maintaining the Armidale's (but did not go ahead due to the political repercussions from potentially losing local jobs). Defence and Serco (the parent company of DMS) later agreed to end the contract in 2017, with the Australian government to tender for a new in-service support contract during 2016. The patrol boat fleet began a mid-life refit program in October 2015, in order to extend hull life until a replacement class of larger vessels enters service from 2022. The patrol boats were refitted two at a time in Singapore, with the RAN chartering the Cape-class patrol boats Cape Byron and Cape Nelson from mid-2015 until the end of 2016 to supplement naval patrol boat availability. During work on the first two patrol boats, the estimated cost of work-per-vessel doubled to A$7 million.

== Operational history ==
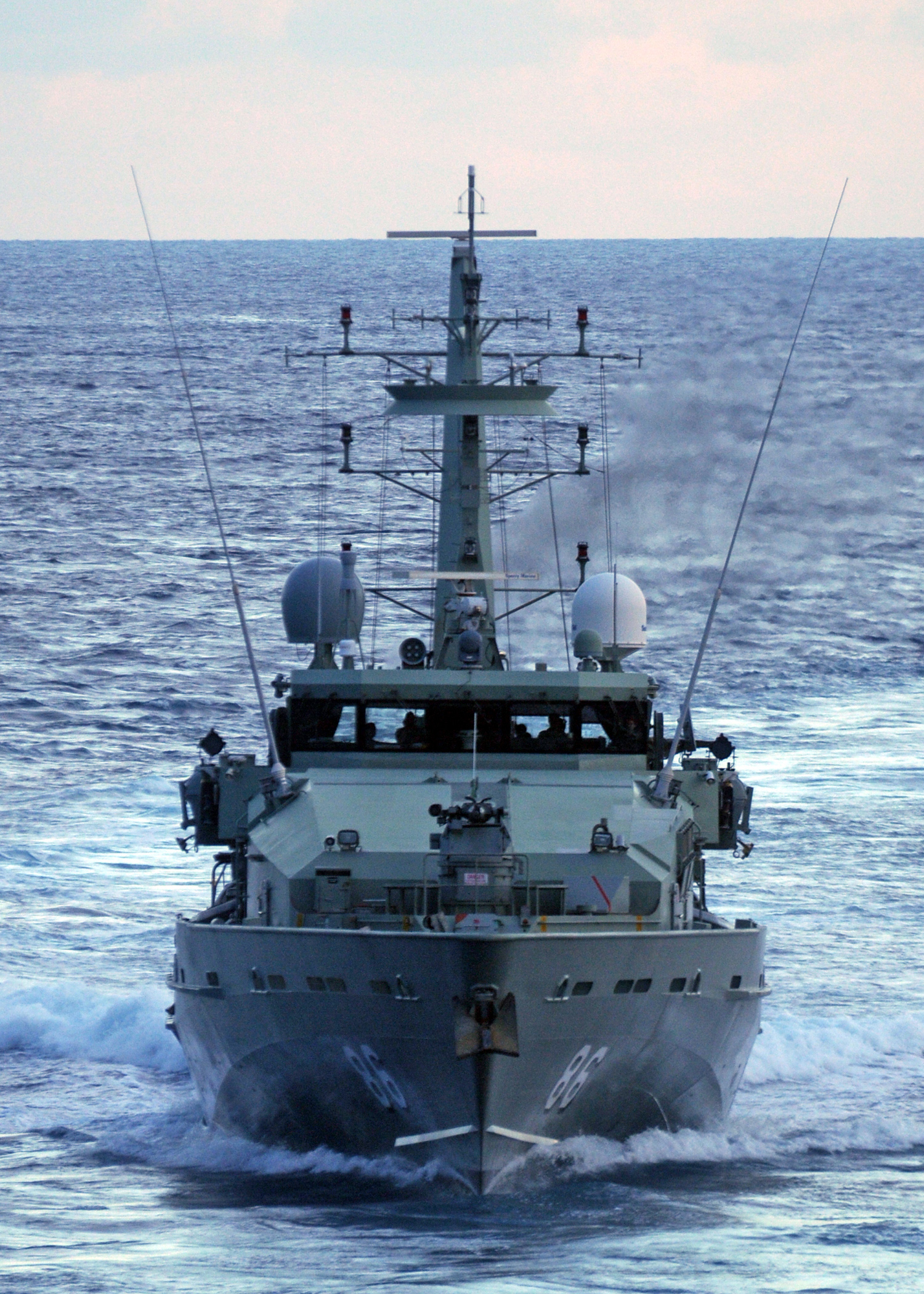
HMAS Albany operating in the Timor Sea during 2012

The Armidale-class ships were operated by the Australian Patrol Boat Group and were primarily tasked with border protection and fisheries patrols. Multiple Armidale-class boats were assigned to patrols of Australian waters at any given time as part of Operation Resolute (and later Operation Sovereign Borders), with an ability to surge further vessels when required.

On introduction of the Armidale class, the Australian Patrol Boat Group was reorganised into four divisions, named after Attack class ships:

- 1st/Attack Division (HMAS Coonawarra, Darwin)
  - Six Armidale Class patrol boat crews (Attack 1–6)
- 2nd/Assail Division (HMAS Coonawarra)
  - Six Armidale Class patrol boat crews (Assail 1–6)
- 3rd/Ardent Division (HMAS Cairns, Cairns)
  - Six Armidale Class patrol boat crews (Ardent 1–6)
- 4th/Aware Division (Dampier, Western Australia)
  - Three Armidale Class patrol boat crews (Aware 1–3) (based in Darwin)

The Patrol Boat force has subsequently been reorganised to allocate a single crew to each platform.

At the start of 2014, the long transit differences and near-constant deployment of the patrol boats for Operation Resolute were impacting on the ability to keep the vessels properly maintained.

In August 2014, a fire broke out aboard Bundaberg while undergoing refit work at a civilian shipyard in Hemmant, Queensland. The patrol boat was damaged beyond repair and was decommissioned on 18 December.

In November 2017 the RAN began deploying Armidale-class patrol boats to the Philippines. The boats have been used to conduct counter-terrorism patrols in the Sulu Sea with the Philippine Navy.

Albany, Childers, and Bathurst were decommissioned on 4 December 2025, becoming the final vessels of the class to leave RAN service.

== Fleet list ==
Ship	Pennant	Homeport	Commissioning date	Commissioning location	Decommissioned
Royal Australian Navy
Armidale	P83	HMAS Coonawarra, Darwin	24 June 2005	Darwin	30 March 2023
Larrakia	P84	HMAS Coonawarra, Darwin	10 February 2006	Darwin	28 September 2023
Bathurst	P85	HMAS Coonawarra, Darwin	10 February 2006	Darwin	4 December 2025
Albany	P86	HMAS Coonawarra, Darwin	15 July 2006	Albany	4 December 2025
Pirie	P87	HMAS Coonawarra, Darwin	29 July 2006	Port Pirie	26 March 2021
Maitland	P88	HMAS Coonawarra, Darwin	29 September 2006	Newcastle	28 April 2022
Ararat	P89	HMAS Coonawarra, Darwin	10 November 2006	Melbourne	2 July 2022
Broome	P90	HMAS Coonawarra, Darwin	10 February 2007	Broome	29 August 2024
Bundaberg	P91	HMAS Cairns, Cairns	3 March 2007	Bundaberg	18 December 2014
Wollongong	P92	HMAS Cairns, Cairns	23 June 2007	Sydney	8 December 2022
Childers	P93	HMAS Coonawarra, Darwin	7 July 2007	Cairns	4 December 2025
Launceston	P94	HMAS Coonawarra, Darwin	22 September 2007	Launceston	1 June 2023
Maryborough	P95	HMAS Coonawarra, Darwin	8 December 2007	Brisbane	28 September 2023
Glenelg	P96	HMAS Coonawarra, Darwin	22 February 2008	Adelaide	7 October 2022
Australian Defence Organisation
Sentinel	—N/a	Henderson, Western Australia	6 October 2022	Henderson	17 February 2025

== Appearances in fiction ==
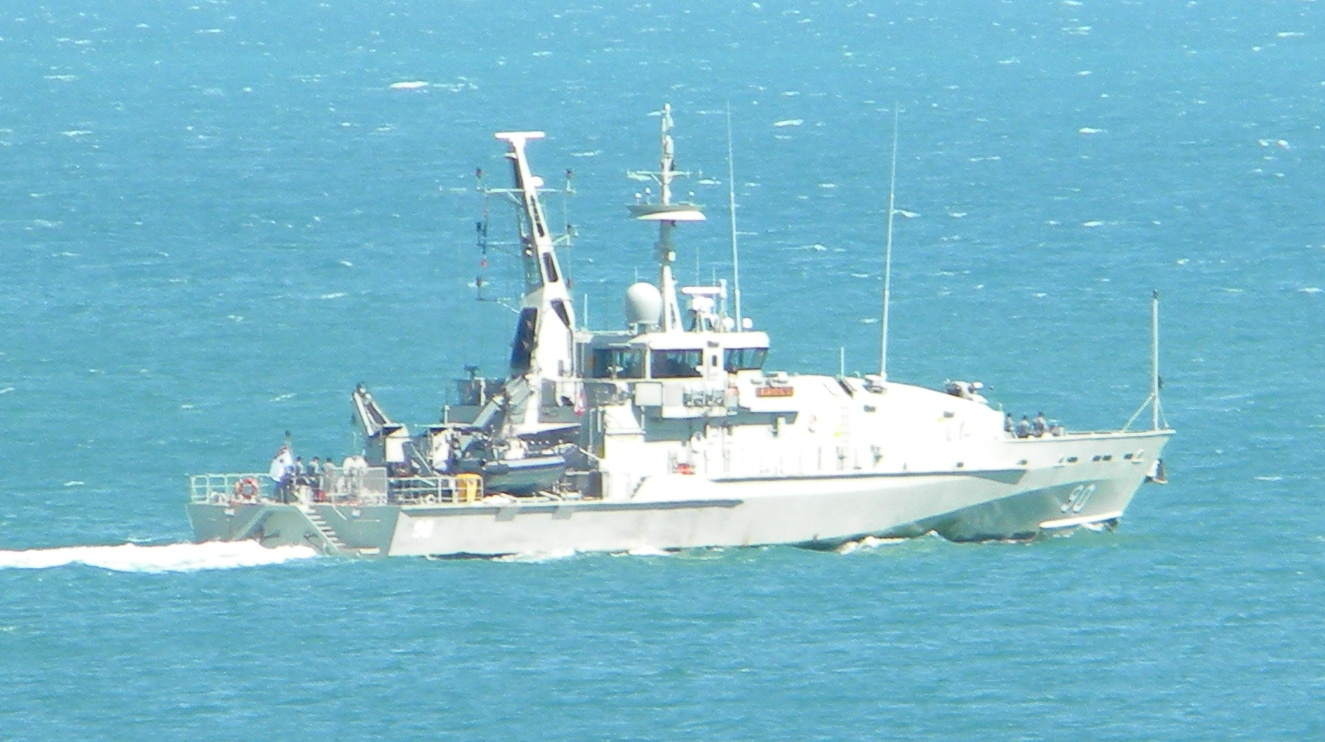
HMAS Broome underway in 2010. During 2008, Broome was used to represent the fictional HMAS Hammersley

From the second season onwards of Sea Patrol, an Australian military drama series, the fictional Armidale-class patrol boat HMAS Hammersley (pennant number 82) is used as the main setting. In 2008, two ships were conflated to represent Hammersley: 42 of the 86 days of filming were spent aboard HMAS Broome, with later pick-up filming aboard HMAS Launceston.

== Replacement ==
Defending Australia in the Asia Pacific Century: Force 2030, the 2009 Department of Defence white paper, proposed replacing the Armidales, along with the RAN's mine warfare and hydrographic vessels, with a single class of multi-role offshore combatant vessels (OCVs). These vessels, with a theoretical maximum displacement up to 2,000 tonnes, would use a modular mission payload system to change between roles as required, and would be equipped for helicopter or unmanned aerial vehicle operations. The 2013 white paper postponed the multi-role OCV as a long-term project.

The 2013 white paper proposed that an existing OCV design be sourced as a short-term replacement for the Armidale class. Procurement project SEA 1179 is undertaking several studies towards the replacement of the Armidales. In April 2016, the Lürssen OPV80A design was selected to replace the Armidale class ships. The replacement OPVs will be larger and provide improved seakeeping and endurance. Construction started in 2018, with entry into service planned from 2022. A hull remediation program was implemented to extend the lifespans of the patrol boats to this point. In 2020, the RAN decided to acquire six evolved Cape class patrol boats instead of performing a full life of type extension (LOTE) on six Armidale class boats.
