= 2012 Indian Ocean migrant boat disaster =

2012 maritime disaster

Coordinates: 8°30′S 105°45′E

The 2012 Indian Ocean migrant boat disaster occurred on 21 June 2012, when a boat carrying more than 200 refugees capsized in the Indian Ocean between the Indonesian island of Java and the Australian external territory of Christmas Island. 109 people were rescued, 17 bodies were recovered, and approximately 70 people remain missing. The boat's passengers were all male and were mostly from Afghanistan.

The boat was discovered by an Australian Customs and Border Protection Service surveillance plane 109 nautical miles (202 km) south of Java at about 3:00 pm AWST. The boat had sent out a distress call on 19 June, but it failed to identify its location. On 20 June, the boat sent out a second distress call, at which point Australian authorities advised the boat to return to Indonesia. The boat was spotted later that day by a surveillance plane as it continued toward Australian waters. "No visual signs of distress" were observed by the plane's crew. Australian authorities then began to prepare to respond when the boat would enter their territory, but it capsized before leaving Indonesian waters.

About 40 survivors were found clinging to the upturned boat, while others were found on floating debris up to four miles (6 km) from the disaster's location. Survivors and bodies of the deceased were transported to Christmas Island aboard the patrol boat HMAS Wollongong. Rescue efforts were coordinated by Indonesian authorities with assistance from Australia. Eight Australian and Indonesian ships, plus five Australian aircraft, were still searching for additional survivors on 22 June. Australian Home Affairs Minister Jason Clare stated that the prospect of finding additional survivors was "increasingly grim", due to rough seas.

Human traffickers often disable their boats once they have entered Australian waters and send out distress calls to have their "cargo" picked up. Christmas Island is a popular target for asylum seekers, whose journeys sometimes end in tragedy. In a statement, the U.N. refugee agency said the tragedy "reinforces the need for renewed international solidarity and cooperation to find protection options for people".

== See also ==
- Suspected Irregular Entry Vessel
- 2010 Christmas Island boat disaster
- November 2009 Indian Ocean migrant boat disaster
- SIEV X
