= Bay-class patrol boat =

Australian border protection boats

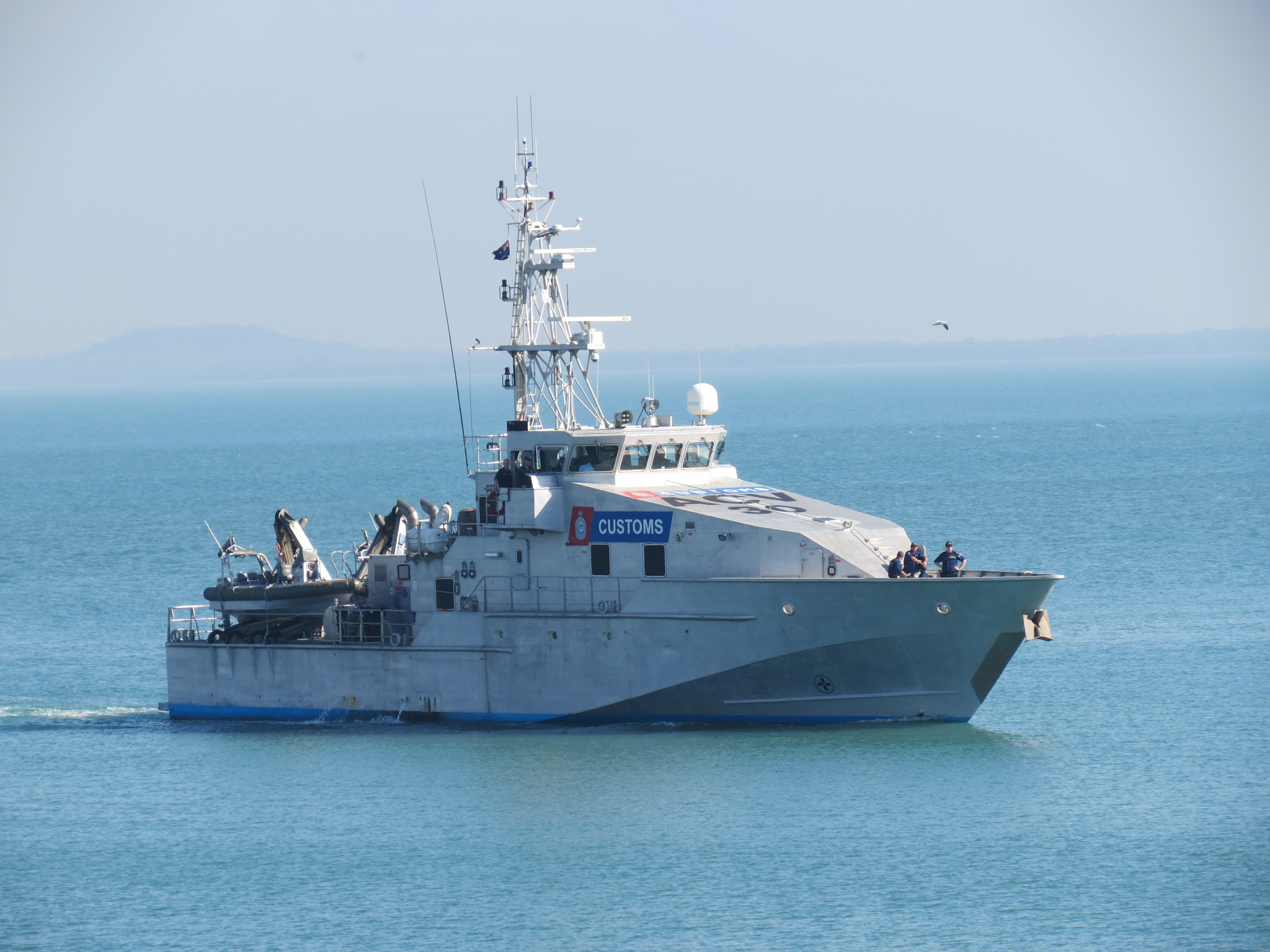
- Bay-class patrol boat Botany Bay in Darwin Harbour in July 2012

Class overview
- Name: Bay class
- Builders: Austal
- Operators: (Australia) Australian Border Force Marine Unit; Sri Lanka Navy; Malaysian Maritime Enforcement Agency
- In service: 1999–present
- Completed: 8
- Active: 2
- Retired: 6

General characteristics
- Type: Patrol boat
- Displacement: 134 tons
- Length: 38.2 m (125 ft 4 in)
- Beam: 7.2 m (23 ft 7 in)
- Draught: 2.4 m (7 ft 10 in)
- Propulsion: 2 × MTU 16V 2000 M70 diesel engines; 1 VosperThornycroft bow thruster
- Speed: 20 knots (37 km/h; 23 mph)
- Range: 1,000 nmi (1,900 km; 1,200 mi) at 20 knots (37 km/h; 23 mph)
- Boats & landing craft carried: 2 × Wiltrading Pursuit 640 vessels (USLC-2C Survey)
- Complement: 12 crew
- Sensors & processing systems: Radar: Surface search: Racal Decca; E/F and I bands; Sonar: Wesmar SS 390E dipping sonar
- Armament: 1 × 7.62 mm general purpose machine gun

The Bay class is a class of eight armed patrol boats, built by Austal and used by the Customs Marine Unit of the Australian Customs and Border Protection Service. They entered service during the late 1990s and early 2000s, and are primarily used on border protection duties.

The class was due to be replaced by 2010, but a request for tender was not issued until June of that year. The availability of the Bay class ships decreased during the later years of their service life. After the Cape class began entering service, four of the Bays were offered to other forces; two each to the Sri Lankan Navy and the Malaysian Maritime Enforcement Agency.

== Design and construction ==
Bay-class vessels have a displacement of 134 tons, are 38.2 metres (125 ft 4 in) long, have a beam of 7.2 metres (23 ft 7 in), and a draught of 2.4 metres (7 ft 10 in). The propulsion system consists of two MTU 16V 2000 M70 diesel engines, supplemented by a VosperThornycroft bow thruster. The patrol boats have a maximum speed of 20 knots (37 km/h; 23 mph), and a maximum range of 1,000 nautical miles (1,900 km; 1,200 mi). Each vessel is fitted with a 7.62 mm general purpose machine gun, and two Wiltrading Pursuit 640 vessels are carried for boarding operations. The sensor suite consists of a Racal Decca surface search radar operating in the E/F and I bands, and a Wesmar SS 390E dipping sonar. A Bay-class vessel has a crew of 12.

The Bay-class was built by Austal. The eight ships were delivered over a period of 19 months, beginning in February 1999.

The Bay-class design was used as the basis for the 14 larger Armidale-class patrol boats in use with the Royal Australian Navy, and the 10 patrol boats used by the Yemen Navy.

== Operational history ==
The eight patrol boats are operated by the Customs Marine Unit of the Australian Customs Service. They are primarily used to patrol Australia's economic exclusion zone, although they also operate in support of other Australian law enforcement and defence agencies, including but not limited to the Australian Federal Police, the Great Barrier Reef Marine Park Authority, and the Royal Australian Navy.

Bay-class vessels often operate on border protection duties under Border Protection Command. The age of the vessels and resulting maintenance needs has seen a drop in the amount of time spent at sea, with other ships of the Customs Marine Unit forced to take up the slack. The Australian Border Force announced its two remaining Bay-class boats would undergo a life-extension refit.

=== Foreign service ===
Two Bay-class patrol boats were gifted to the Sri Lankan Navy. Corio Bay was transferred on 30 March 2014, and Hervey Bay was handed over on 3 June that year. Originally renamed as SLNS Oshadi and SLNS Omaya, the patrol boats were recommissioned on 9 July as SLNS Mihikatha and SLNS Rathnadeepa.

Another two were offered to the Malaysian Maritime Enforcement Agency in 2014. Arnhem Bay was handed over on 10 February 2015, and was renamed KM Perwira. Dame Roma Mitchell was transferred in May 2015, and renamed KM Satria.

== Replacement ==
The Bay class were due to be replaced in 2010, but it was not until June of that year that a request for tender was issued for eight new, larger patrol boats. Austal received the tender for eight 57.8 metres (190 ft) patrol boats on 12 August 2011. Construction of the vessels, designated the Cape class, started in 2012 with the keel of the first boat being laid in June 2012, and launched in January 2013.

The new patrol boats entered service between March 2013 and September 2015. Most Bay-class vessels were retired prior to Australian Customs and Border Protection Service being reformed into the Australian Border Force (ABF). Only two Bay-class vessels, Roebuck Bay and Storm Bay, are still in service with the ABF.

In December 2024, the ABF ordered two Evolved Cape-class vessels to replace its remaining two Bay-class patrol boats.

== Ships ==
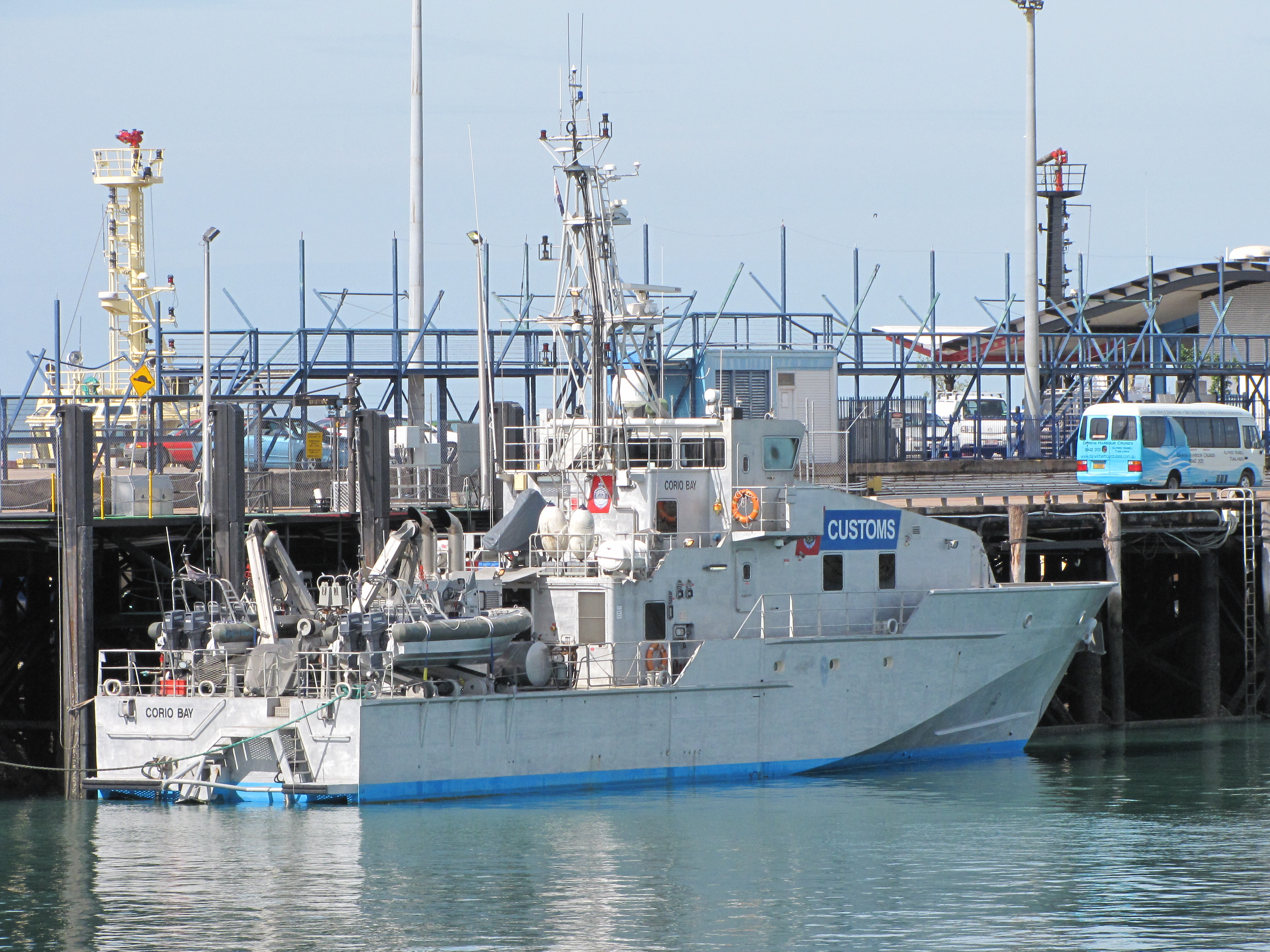
ACV Corio Bay in 2010

ACV Roebuck Bay (ABFC 200) in ABF service
ACV Holdfast Bay (ACV 20) retired
ACV Botany Bay (ACV 30) retired
ACV Hervey Bay (ACV 40) now SLNS Rathnadeepa
ACV Corio Bay (ACV 50) now SLNS Mihikatha
ACV Arnhem Bay (ACV 60) now KM Perwira
ACV Dame Roma Mitchell (ACV 70) now KM Satria
ACV Storm Bay (ABFC 210) in ABF service
