= HMAS Cairns (naval base) =

Australian naval base

- Cairns, Queensland in Australia
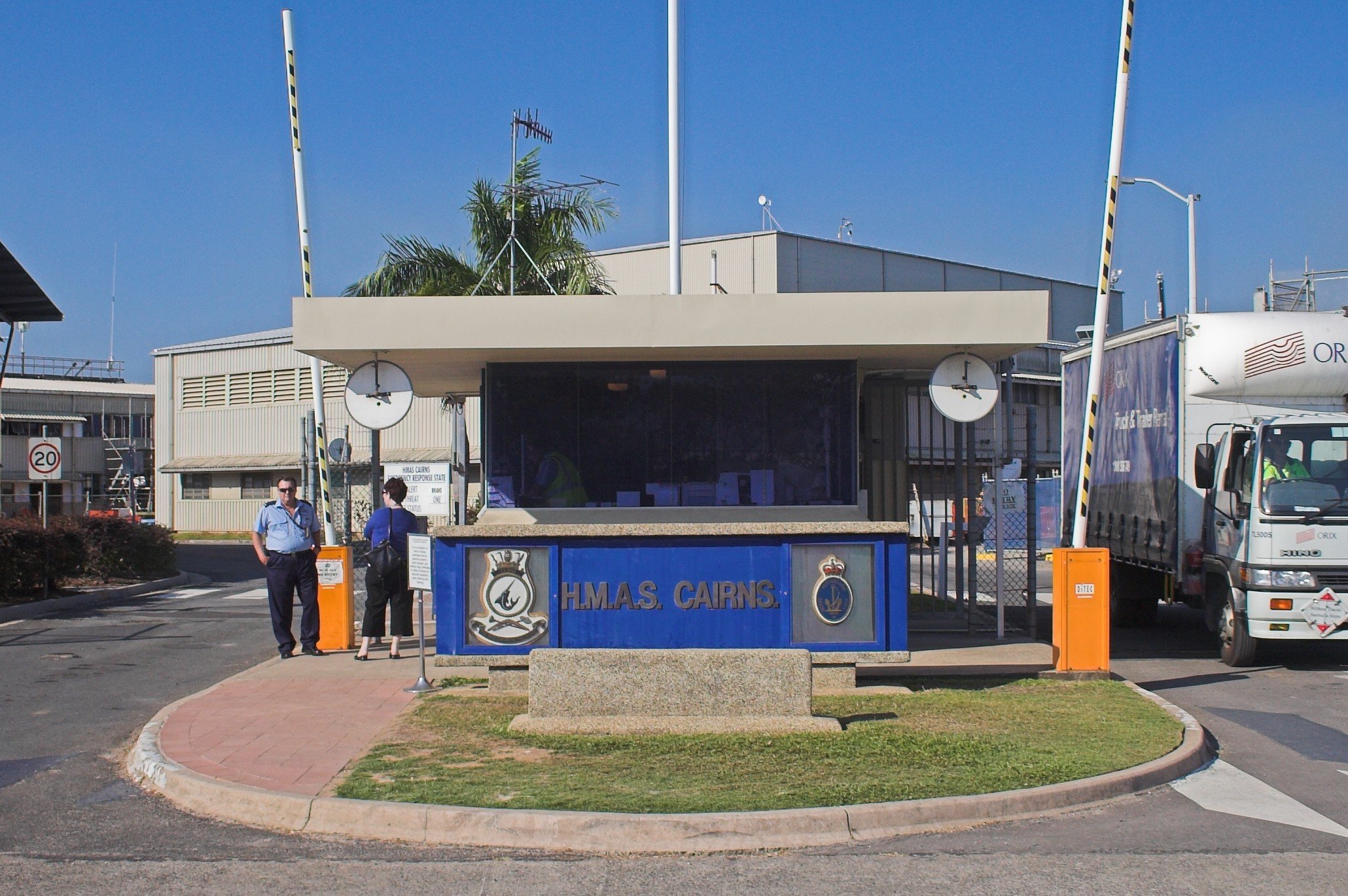
- Sentry gate at the entrance to HMAS Cairns

Site information
- Type: Naval base
- Owner: Department of Defence
- Operator: Royal Australian Navy
- Website: navy.gov.au/establishments/hmas-cairns

Location
- Location in Queensland
- Coordinates: 16°56′08″S 145°46′40″E

Site history
- In use: 1974 - present

Garrison information
- Current commander: Commander Alfonso Santos, CSC, RAN
- Garrison: Australian Patrol Boat Group; RAN Hydrographic Service

HMAS Cairns is a Royal Australian Navy (RAN) base located adjacent to the Trinity Inlet on the shore of Trinity Bay in Cairns, Queensland, Australia. Although used regularly as a port-of-call since before World War II, a permanent RAN presence was not established until 1971, when a maintenance and support base for patrol boats was set up. The base was formally commissioned in 1971 as a minor war vessel base. The current commander of the base is Commander David Hannah, RAN.

HMAS Cairns is responsible for all Australian naval activity off north-eastern Australia, and is the home base for one Armidale class patrol boat, two Cape class patrol boats and the ships of the Royal Australian Navy Hydrographic Service.

== History ==
The RAN had been using Cairns as a regular stop since before World War II, and during the war, Cairns was the principal port-of-call for many ships prior to heading to Pacific destinations. There was no official RAN presence in Cairns until 1971, when facilities for the maintenance of the RAN's patrol boats were established. In 1974, HMAS Cairns was commissioned as the parent establishment for patrol vessels and hydrographic ships based at Cairns.

In 2016, the Australian Government announced plans to significantly redevelop Cairns as northern Australia's key strategic naval base. The plans announced projected that the number of personnel would increase from 900 to 3,000 by 2020, via an A$120 million injection over ten years. The base, and adjacent industry facilities, have been upgraded and designated 'Regional Maintenance Center (RMC) North East' as the first for four dedicated naval support centres to be established in strategically important ports.

In May 2021 the Australian Government further announced an upgrade to the base and its facilities to support the incoming Arafura-Class patrol vessels currently under construction. These upgrades, valued at A$250 million, are aimed at "expanding berthing capacity and enhancing supporting wharf and landside facilities"

== Facilities and operational units ==
HMAS Cairns is currently responsible for all Australian naval activity from Rockhampton to Thursday Island and serves as a home base for four Cape class patrol boats. The base is responsible for berthing the RAN's entire hydrographic fleet, consisting of a Leeuwin class survey vessels. From 'early' 2027 HMAS Cairns will host HMAS Arafura and one of her sisters.

=== Ships stationed ===
- Cape class
  - ADV Cape Fourcroy
  - ADV Cape Inscription
  - ADV Cape Otway
  - ADV Cape Peron
- Leeuwin class
  - HMAS Leeuwin
- Arafura class - from 2027
  - HMAS Arafura

== See also ==
- List of Royal Australian Navy bases
