= Charles William Fremantle =

British government official (1834–1914)

The Honourable Sir Charles William Fremantle KCB JP FRSA
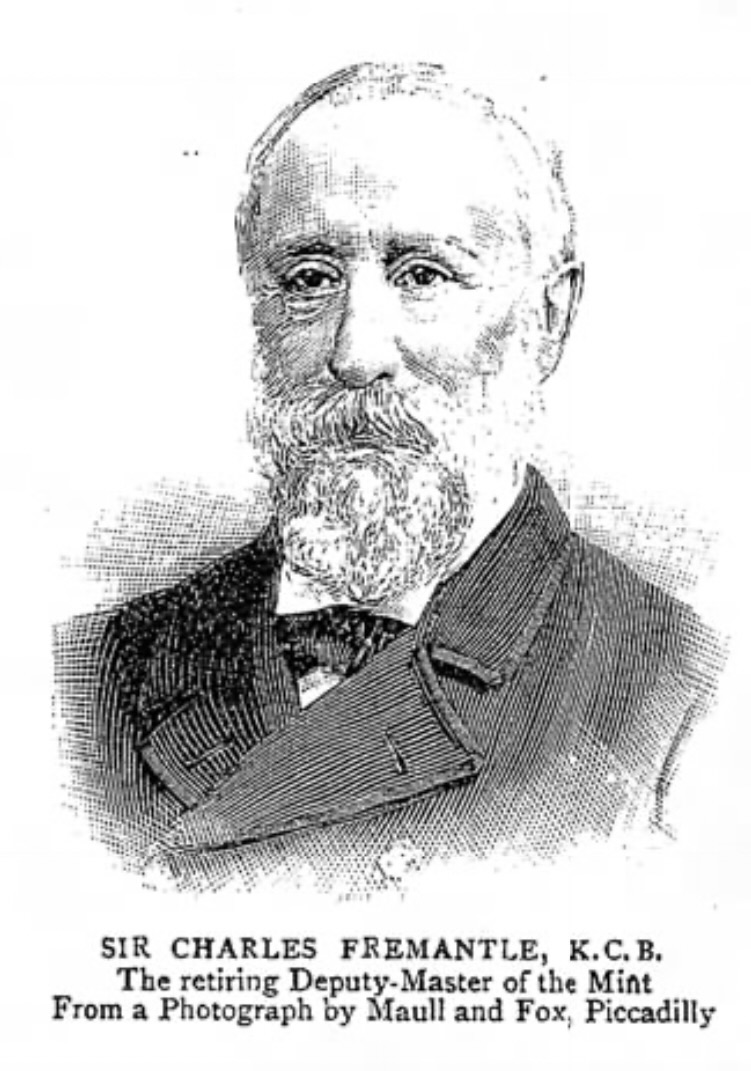
- Fremantle, c. 1894

Deputy Master and Comptroller of the Royal Mint
- In office December 1868 – September 1894
- Preceded by: William Barton
- Succeeded by: Horace Seymour

Private Secretary to the Prime Minister of the United Kingdom
- In office February 1868 – December 1868 Serving with Montague Corry
- Prime Minister: Benjamin Disraeli
- Preceded by: Herbert Murray
- Succeeded by: Algernon West

Personal details
- Born: 12 August 1834 Swanbourne, Buckinghamshire, England
- Died: 8 October 1914 (aged 80) London, England
- Resting place: Swanbourne, Buckinghamshire, England
- Spouse: Sophia Smith (m. 1865–1914)
- Children: 5
- Parent(s): Thomas Fremantle, 1st Baron Cottesloe; Louisa Fremantle
- Relatives: Thomas Francis Fremantle (grandfather); George Nugent (grandfather); Maria Nugent (grandmother); Charles Fremantle (uncle); William Fremantle (uncle); Stephen Grenville Fremantle (uncle); Thomas Fremantle, 2nd Baron Cottesloe (brother); William Henry Fremantle (brother); Edmund Fremantle (brother); Thomas Fremantle, 3rd Baron Cottesloe (nephew); Francis Fremantle (nephew)
- Occupation: Government official, corporate director

Sir Charles William Fremantle (12 August 1834 – 8 October 1914) was a British governmental official who served 26 years as deputy master of the Royal Mint. As the chancellor of the exchequer was ex officio master of the Royal Mint beginning in 1870, Fremantle was its executive head for almost a quarter century.

Educated at Eton College, Fremantle entered the Treasury in 1853 as a clerk. He served as private secretary to several officials, lastly Benjamin Disraeli, both while Disraeli was chancellor of the exchequer, and then in 1868 while he was prime minister. Disraeli's appointment of Fremantle as deputy master of the Royal Mint excited some controversy but was supported by his political rival William Gladstone.

Fremantle began as deputy master to Thomas Graham, the master of the Mint. Graham died in September 1869, and the Treasury decided the mastership should go to the chancellor of the day, with the deputy master the administrative head of the Royal Mint. Fremantle began work to modernise the antiquated Royal Mint. Much of the work had to wait until the Royal Mint was reconstructed at its premises at Tower Hill in 1882. Fremantle sought to beautify the coinage and, believing the Mint's engraver, Leonard Charles Wyon, not up to the task, sought to do so by resurrecting classic coin designs, like Benedetto Pistrucci's depiction of St George and the dragon for the sovereign.

In 1894, at the age of sixty, Fremantle retired from the Royal Mint and thereafter spent time as a corporate director and as a magistrate. He died in 1914, just under two months after his eightieth birthday.

== Early life and career ==
Charles William Fremantle was born on 12 August 1834, the third son of Sir Thomas Fremantle, Bt (later Baron Cottesloe) and his wife, the former Louisa Nugent. He was educated at Eton and then entered the Treasury as a clerk in April 1853. While there, he acted as a private secretary to several officials, successively Sir William Hayter, Sir William Hylton Jolliffe and The Honourable Sir Henry Brand, later speaker of the House of Commons.

When Benjamin Disraeli was appointed chancellor of the exchequer in 1866, Fremantle served as his private secretary. Fremantle was recommended to Disraeli by Brand, who had served as parliamentary secretary to the Treasury. In 1867, Fremantle was made secretary to the boundary commission under the Representation of the People Act. When Disraeli became prime minister in early 1868, Fremantle was one of his private secretaries, along with Montague Corry, keeping that position until appointed deputy master of the Royal Mint in December of that year.

== Deputy master ==
=== Appointment ===
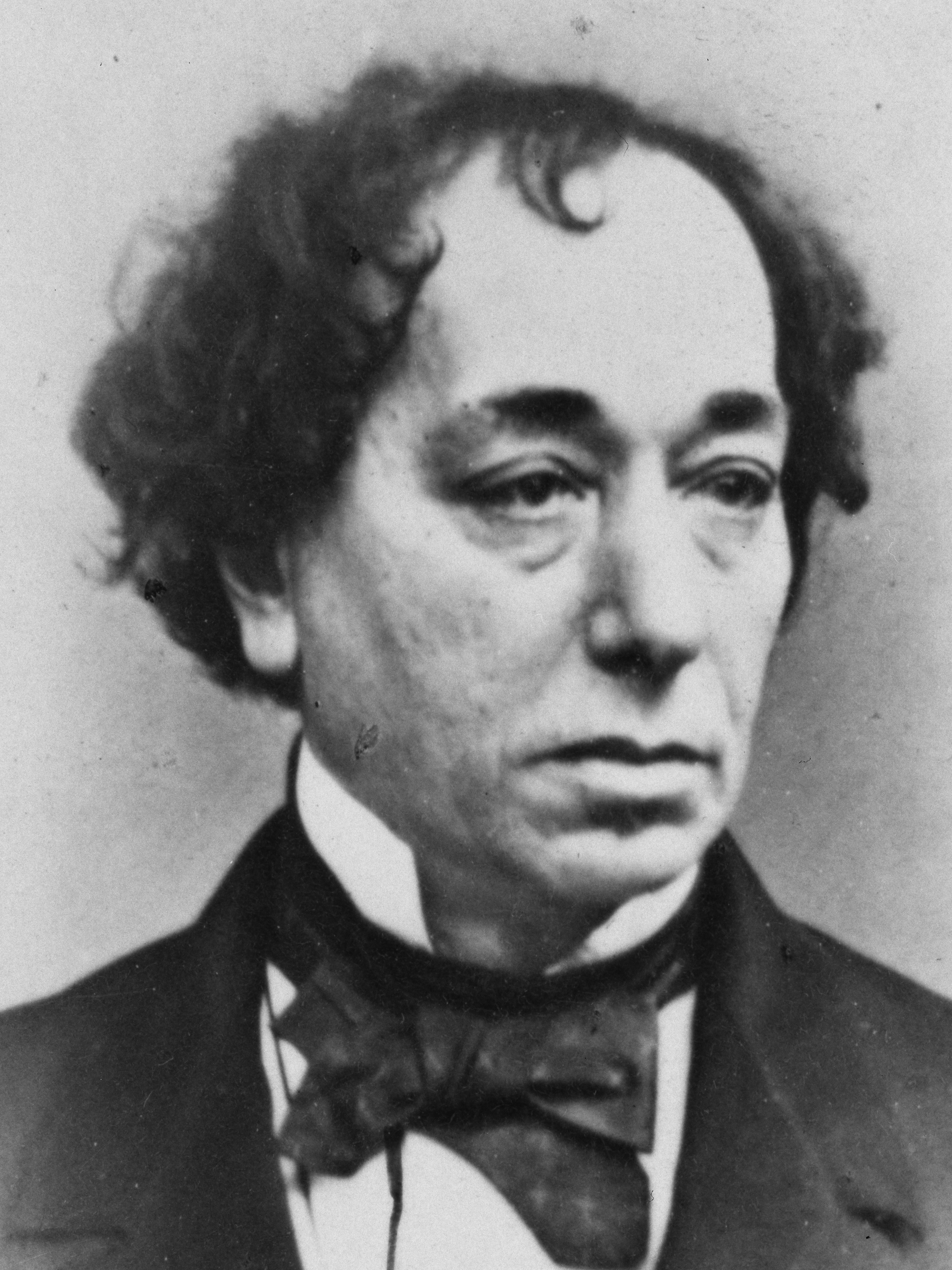
Benjamin Disraeli appointed his private secretary, Fremantle, as deputy master of the Royal Mint.

In 1868, the deputy mastership of the Royal Mint fell vacant with the death of William Barton, and the appointment was in the gift of the prime minister, Disraeli, who appointed Fremantle. Disraeli felt that the Mint had been run by its master, the chemist Thomas Graham, with little energy or administrative skill, and would benefit from an infusion of new blood. The long-time senior clerk, Robert Mushet, desired the position, with the support of Graham and the former master, Sir John Herschel, and the appointment was questioned in parliament. Disraeli defended the appointment, denying that Fremantle was his political follower, and stating that Fremantle was chosen for his youth and experience at the Treasury. Disraeli's political rival, William Gladstone, himself a former master of the Mint, agreed with his rival Disraeli that the Royal Mint needed someone from outside who had worked in one of the great departments of state. According to the numismatic historians, G. P. Dyer and P. P. Gaspar, in The New History of the Royal Mint, "with the great men thus in agreement, the House was content to let the matter rest."

Disraeli also stated that Graham supported the appointment, though Dyer and Gaspar found it significant he was not advised in advance. According to Sir John Craig in his history of the Royal Mint, "Graham's general administration caused some unease" and Fremantle was appointed "to pull the place together".

=== 1870 reforms ===
Following a royal commission in 1848, the Royal Mint was reorganised in 1851, with the Company of Moneyers, the guild with whom the government had long indentured for production of coinage, given three months' notice, as provided for in the indenture. By the time of Fremantle's appointment, Graham (who was appointed in 1855) had gone from attempts at reform to being the target of accusations of corruption and nepotism.

Graham died on 16 September 1869. With a vacancy in the mastership, reform could be considered more readily, and Fremantle worked with Charles Rivers Wilson, a former colleague at the Treasury, on a report, submitted on 6 November. They recommended that the Royal Mint consolidate to a smaller site, either at its current premises at Tower Hill or somewhere closer to the City of London. Herschel and Graham were noteworthy scientists, but the Fremantle-Wilson report deemed this unnecessary to run the Mint. What was needed was "active and intelligent control and the application of well-trained experience in matters of business".

In a supplemental report on 17 November, Fremantle and Wilson recommended reductions of staff and salaries, proposing that Fremantle's post of deputy master be eliminated as unnecessary. Fremantle may have expected to be given Graham's title. The Treasury accepted most recommendations with a minute dated 7 January 1870, but instead of the position of deputy master being abolished, the mastership was to be held by the chancellor of the exchequer ex officio and without salary, with the Mint to be run by the deputy master. This was formalised in the Coinage Act 1870, which consolidated the laws relating to the Royal Mint to a single document, another of the recommendations. Fremantle did not initially receive the master's salary of £1500 (equivalent to £154,371 in 2025), but this followed within a few years.

=== Updating the Royal Mint ===
In 1870, Fremantle undertook a tour of European mints in company with the newly appointed chemist of the Mint, William Chandler Roberts, and an engineer, James M. Napier. The Treasury allocated £1800 (equivalent to £185,245 in 2025) for expenses on this tour, which took place from May to July of that year. Their published report stated that the Royal Mint had fallen behind European mints in scientific research and in the application of the sciences to the Mint's work. Fremantle later stated that since the Royal Mint's current equipment had been installed in 1816, every Continental mint had updated its equipment, even that in Constantinople, making the Royal Mint the least efficient in Europe.

In the 1870 act, parliament required the deputy master to submit an annual report. These contained detailed information and statistics regarding the Mint's activities. With the first report, published in 1871, Fremantle began a series that Dyer and Gaspar described as "long and extremely helpful", and that would continue for over a century. These were published as parliamentary papers and contained lengthy appendices by Roberts and others.

Royal Mint workers were paid mostly through piece-rates, which were pooled and shared. This could work harshly in slack times. In 1870, Fremantle decreased the piece-rates while increasing weekly wages, reducing the reliance on piece payments. Piece-rates at the Royal Mint were not entirely abolished in favour of weekly wages until 1923, long after Fremantle's departure. Also in 1870, Fremantle recruited a section of mechanics to deal with machinery repair and fabricate items needed in the works; until then, all but the most minor mechanical repairs were contracted out. From 1880, the Royal Mint built automatic weighing machines to weigh newly-struck coins, with improvements by the Mint mechanics.

To Fremantle's frustration, rebuilding the Royal Mint with up-to-date equipment proved a difficult process to even begin, with the question of whether to rebuild on the existing site at Tower Hill or find new premises elsewhere in London tied up in Treasury and parliamentary red tape. These delays led to a shutdown of nearly five months in 1876 when antiquated equipment broke. So long as removal of the Royal Mint was a possibility, according to Craig, Fremantle "grumbled in vain through twelve years' search for a new site".

Negotiations for the government to acquire land at Whitefriars from the corporation of London began in 1878 but three years of discussions produced no result, and a committee of the House of Commons decided upon a reconstruction at Tower Hill. Fremantle was opposed because this would require a complete shutdown of coinage, but agreed once it appeared that the Bank of England had an abnormally large stock of gold coins, bronze coinage could be contracted from Ralph Heaton & Sons of Birmingham, and a stock of silver coins could be built up before the commencement of work on 1 February 1882. The work ran for ten months, during which time, among other accomplishments, the old beam engines were replaced by modern gear, the Mint's first electrical generation station was installed, and most of the old coinage presses were sold (and replaced with new ones), except for some retained for striking medals. There was no change in the land area occupied by the Royal Mint; the next time a move was considered, in 1922, it was because the Mint was short of space. When the work was done, Fremantle stated that the facilities compared favourably to those of any other mint.

=== Coinage redesign and other activities ===
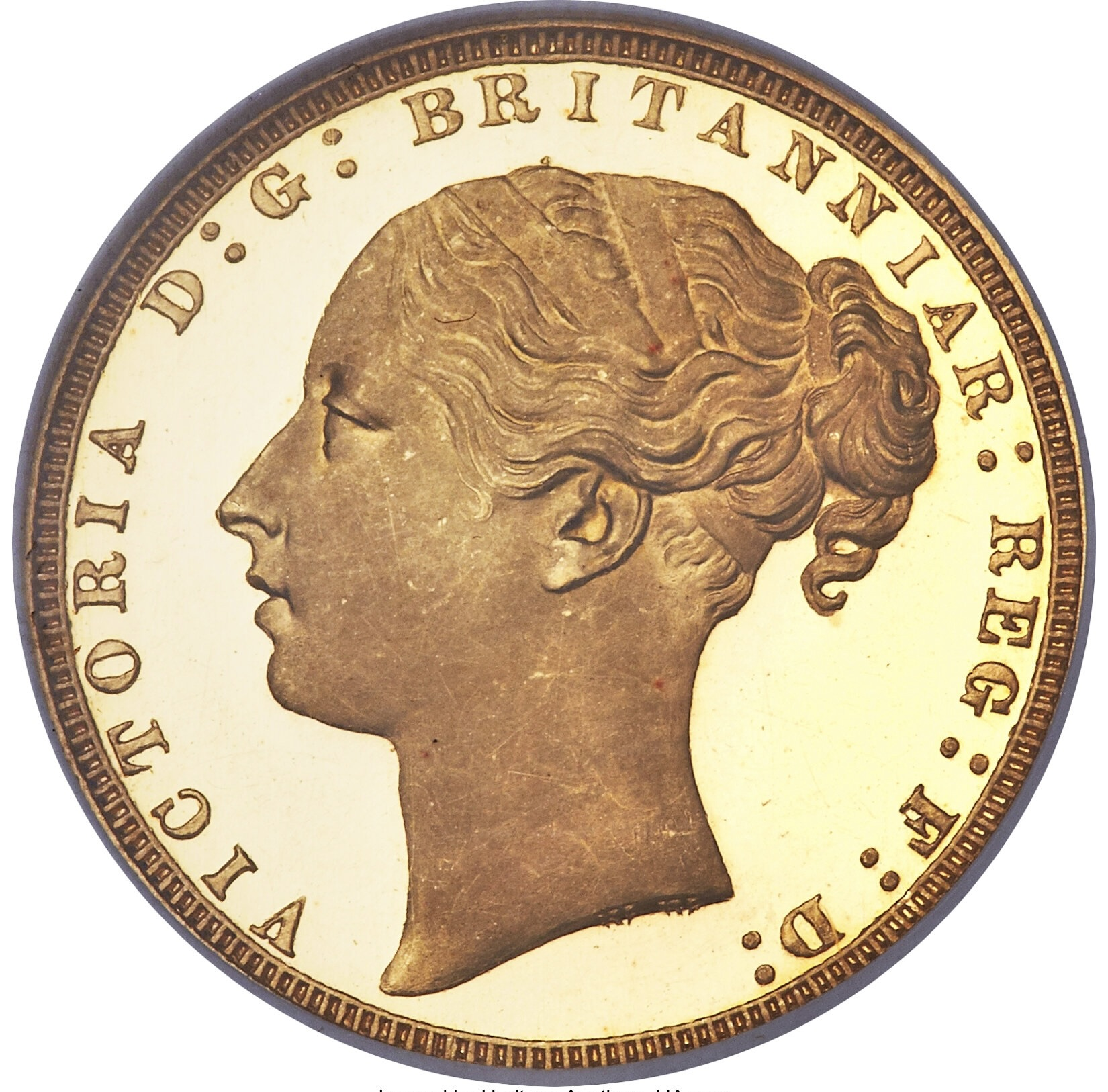
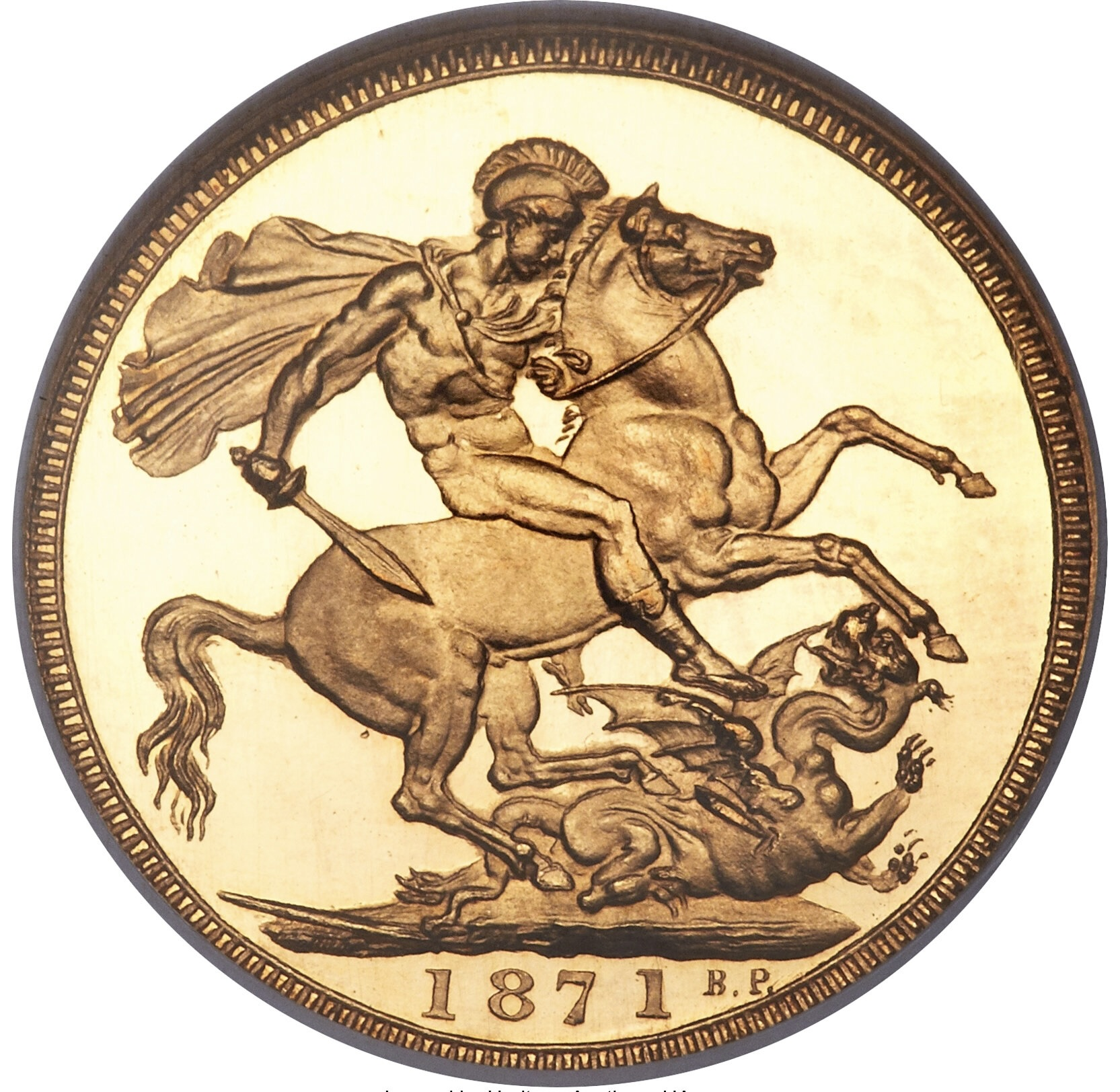
Fremantle restored Benedetto Pistrucci's design of Saint George and the dragon to the sovereign in 1871.

Fremantle, described by Dyer and Gaspar as a "gentleman of cultivated taste", sought to improve the appearance of Britain's coinage, generally through the re-issuance of classic designs. In 1871, he restored Benedetto Pistrucci's design depicting Saint George and the dragon to the sovereign for the first time in almost half a century. Stated Fremantle, "it is hardly possible to over-rate the advantages accruing to a coinage from an artistic and well-executed design". Nevertheless, he considered the Royal Mint's engraver through most of his time there, Leonard Charles Wyon, competent but not outstanding in a field that might not produce a genius in every generation, and wrote in 1880 "I am sorry to say there is, in my opinion no really good English Engraver now living. Our Mint 'Modeller & Engraver', Mr Leonard C. Wyon ... is certainly the best." According to Dyer and Gaspar, Fremantle meant, "the best in a poor field".

Another engraver that Fremantle was able to recommend, in 1876, was George T. Morgan of Birmingham. This was in response to a request by the director of the United States Mint, Henry R. Linderman, who was seeking a good British engraver. Linderman hired Morgan, who emigrated to the United States, as a special assistant. Morgan went on to design the Morgan silver dollar, struck beginning in 1878.

Fremantle's next opportunity for coinage redesign at the Royal Mint came with the Jubilee coinage of 1887, which saw new designs for several denominations. This coinage was delayed by slow progress on the portrait of Queen Victoria which was to appear on them, by Joseph Boehm; on 15 January 1886, Fremantle wrote to a Treasury official to secure payment of £200 (equivalent to £22,475 in 2025) to Boehm, which Fremantle described as a moderate fee for the work of seven years. When the new coins were issued, Fremantle wrote an article for the June number of Murray's Magazine, entitled, "Our New Coins and Their Pedigree", in which he criticised the coins of the earlier part of the Victorian era, calling them "commonplace". Fremantle, though, had praise for Pistrucci's "beautiful design of St George", which was expanded to the crown, double sovereign, and five pound piece.

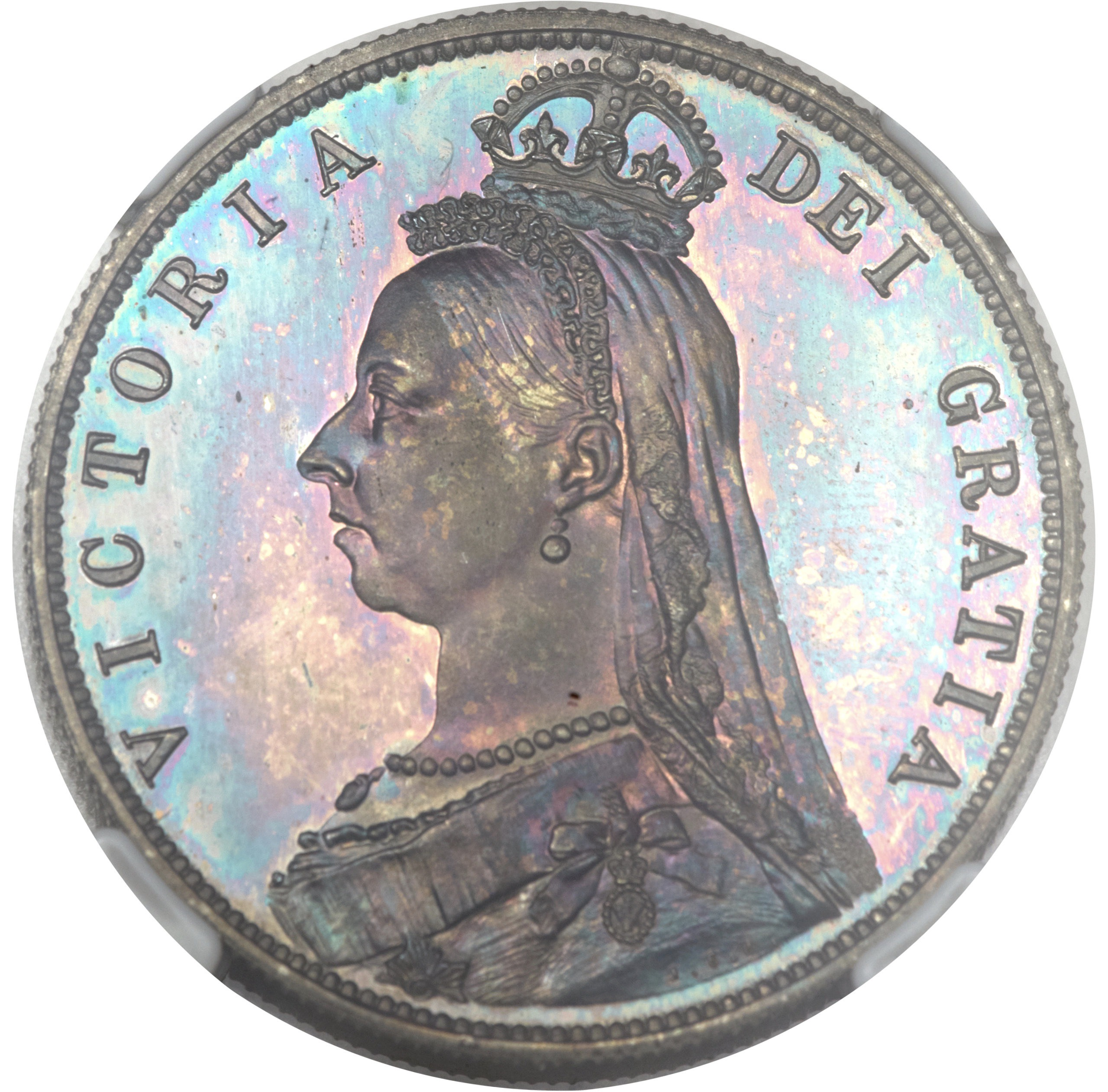
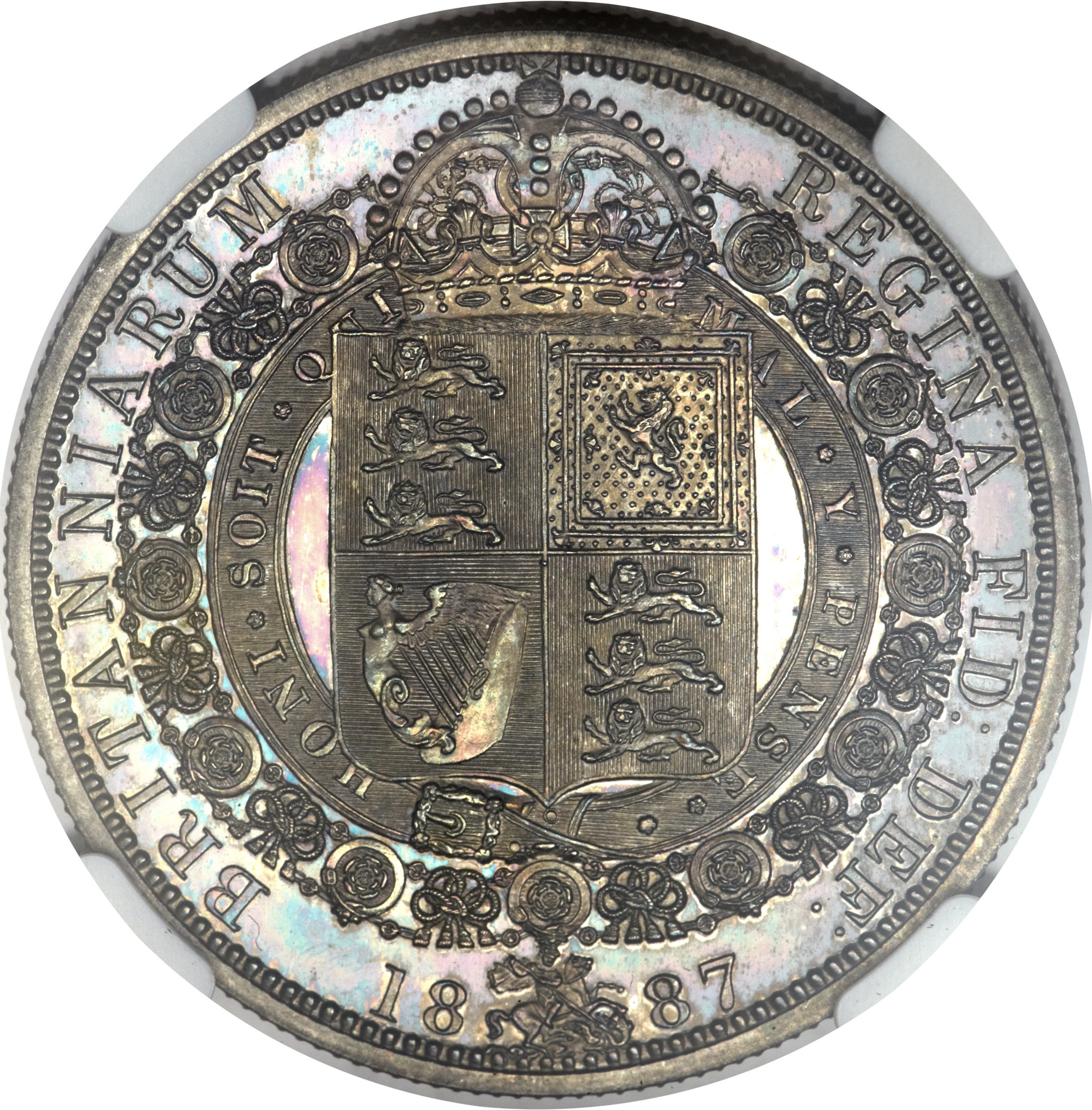
The Jubilee coinage was mocked on its release for the small crown on Victoria's head. (Half crown shown).

The new coins, which bore Boehm's portrait of Victoria and were engraved by Wyon, were released in June 1887, and were widely mocked for the small crown depicted on the Queen's head, which looked like it might fall off. Fremantle mourned, "the sad turn affairs have taken, most unexpected to me". In a letter to Robert Hunt, Deputy Master of the Sydney Mint, Fremantle stated, "without a great & skilled Engraver we shall never have a really fine head on our coinage". Fremantle took consolation in that, "at any rate they are better than the old ones". Still, in 1891, the year of Wyon's death, Fremantle sat as a member of a committee to advise on new coinage designs. The result was the Old Head coinage (1893–1901) in which particular attention was given to the crown, which Fremantle stated "left little to be desired as a work of art".

The Old Head coinage was engraved by George William de Saulles, who was given only a probationary contract. On 1 January 1894, Fremantle wrote to the Treasury to request that de Saulles be given permanent status on the ground that his work on the Old Head coins had been praised both by experts and the public. De Saulles would go on to design the coinage of King Edward VII, shortly before dying in 1903.

Fremantle was himself a coin collector, and, from 1879, a member of the Numismatic Society of London. He had the Royal Mint's collection catalogued and the catalogue published. Finding gaps in the collection, he obtained permission from the Treasury to restrike 18th- and 19th-century coins to fill them. When the new coinage designs of 1887 and 1893 were struck, he made proof sets available to the public, though at high prices. He exhibited his collection of coins at the Royal Yorkshire Jubilee Exhibition near Bradford in 1887.

Fremantle visited the mints in the United States in 1884, travelling with Roberts, and also planned to inspect the assay offices. He also visited Canada on a tour that brought members of the British Association for the Advancement of Science across the Atlantic. In Montreal, the correspondent of the New-York Tribune described Fremantle as "a man of imposing presence, tall and erect, with strong features. He is an authority on all matters pertaining to metals."

Fremantle served as a British delegate to the International Bimetallic Conference in 1881, and was at the Monetary Congress of 1889, both in Paris, also serving as a British delegate to the International Monetary Congress of 1892 in Brussels. He also served as a member of the Royal Commission on Gold and Silver in 1886, and was a member of several interdepartmental committees relating to the Civil Service.

== Retirement and death ==
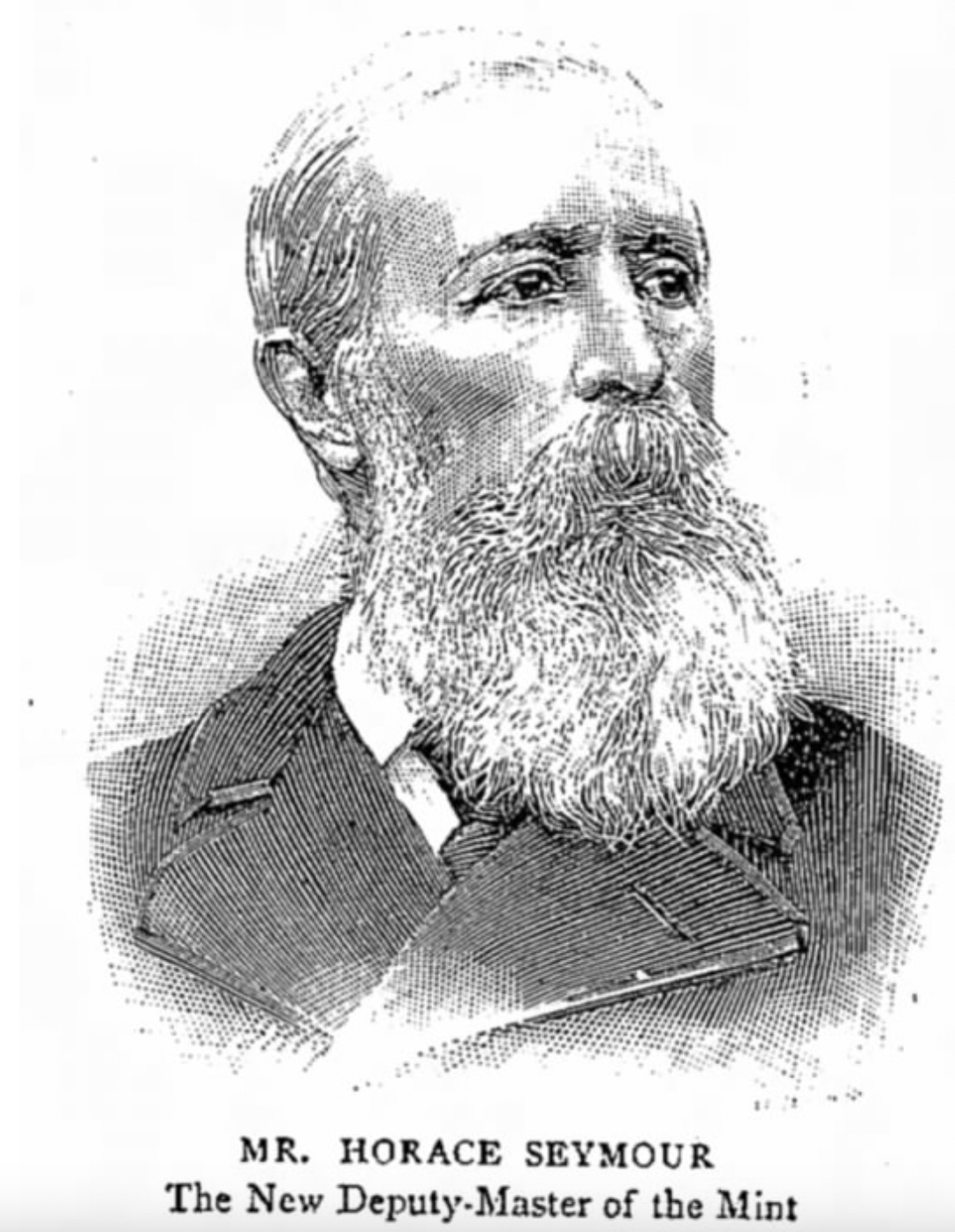
Horace Seymour succeeded Fremantle as deputy master.

Fremantle retired as deputy master in September 1894 and was succeeded by Horace Seymour. Fremantle's service of almost 26 years is the longest of any deputy master of modern times. The London correspondent of The Yorkshire Herald wondered at Fremantle's retirement, given he was sixty and in good health, and was the boss in a position described as "none too arduous".

In 1895, Fremantle travelled to Japan, where he was given a tour of the Osaka Mint by its director, Hasegawa Tameharu, whom he had met while the Japanese official was touring Europe. In 1897, he contributed an article entitled "The Queen's Coinages" to the Diamond Jubilee number of The Financial News.

From 1896 to 1903, Fremantle was one of the British directors on the board of the Suez Canal Company. He served as vice president of the Corporation of Foreign Bondholders. He was a member of the board of directors of, among other concerns, Parr's Bank, the Standard Bank of South Africa, the Bank of Australasia, the Eagle Insurance Company and the Egyptian Delta Light Railways. He joined the Royal Society of Arts in 1895 and was elected one of its vice presidents the same year, holding that position at the time of his death in 1914. He served as a magistrate for Middlesex, London and Westminster.

Both before and after his retirement, Fremantle was involved with the Charity Organisation Society, chairing its council in 1892 and 1893, and was chairman of the Whitechapel Charity Organisation Committee for more than twenty years. The Charity Organisation Review deemed him one of the "Fathers of our movement" and that his talents and activity "entitle Sir Charles Fremantle to an honoured place among those who have served the good cause".

Following a short illness, Fremantle died on the evening of 8 October 1914 at 4 Sloane Street, his London residence. The Daily Telegraph recorded that since his retirement from the Mint, "Sir Charles had been for the last twenty years a well-known and popular personality in the City, having been identified with various important undertakings". He had celebrated his eightieth birthday in August and had continued to attend to his positions in the City in apparent good health.

== Family and honours ==
Fremantle's father, Sir Thomas Fremantle, was ennobled as Baron Cottesloe in 1874, entitling his sons to preface their names with "The Honourable". Charles was his third son; the eldest, Thomas, succeeded to his father's titles. The second son was the Very Rev. The Honourable William Henry Fremantle, dean of Ripon, and the fourth was Admiral The Honourable Sir Edmund Fremantle.

Charles Fremantle's paternal grandfather was Vice-admiral Sir Thomas Francis Fremantle, whose son (Charles's uncle) was Admiral Sir Charles Fremantle, after whom the city of Fremantle, Western Australia, is named. His maternal grandparents were Sir George Nugent, and the American-born diarist Maria Nugent.

On 20 April 1865 at St Peter's Church, Eaton Square, Fremantle married Sophia Smith, youngest daughter of Abel Smith; the marriage was performed by his uncle, Rev. William Fremantle. The couple had four sons and a daughter. Charles Fremantle was created a companion of the Order of the Bath (CB) in 1880, and a knight commander of that order (KCB) in 1890.

== Assessment ==
Dyer and Gaspar wrote that under Fremantle, the Royal Mint of "Graham, with its haphazard administration and antiquated machinery, had given way to a modern mint which no longer relied upon others to show it the way forward". One way he did so was his encouragement of Roberts (who took the name Roberts-Austen) who in his third of a century at the Royal Mint until his death in 1902, believed that research into metals could advance the Royal Mint's abilities. "It was the achievement of Fremantle, who by his breadth of vision promoted the work of Roberts-Austen to place the Mint for a quarter of a century within the circle of the world's great scientific institutions."

The Royal Mint Museum, in their page on Fremantle, called him "without doubt one of the key figures in the development of the Royal Mint". The chancellor of the exchequer at the time of Fremantle's retirement, Sir William Harcourt, wrote of him, "Sir Charles Fremantle has served with eminent distinction first in the Treasury and afterwards as Deputy Master of the Mint. His diligence, fidelity, and remarkable capacity have, throughout a period of more than forty years, commanded the confidence and respect of all the Heads of Departments in which he served." A later deputy master, Thomas Henry Elliott, wrote of Fremantle after his death in 1914, that the experience gained from his visits to the foreign mints in 1870 and 1884 "enabled Sir Charles to carry out various reforms in the different departments of the Mint which were of the greatest value, and his arrangements in all their general principles have stood the test of time and made the task of his successors a comparatively easy one".

== Sources ==
- "Obituary". Journal of the Royal Society of Arts. 62 (3230). Royal Society of Arts: 975. 16 October 1914. JSTOR 41341771.
- "Sir Charles Fremantle". Charity Organisation Review. 36: 364–365. December 1914.
- Clancy, Kevin (2017) [2015]. A History of the Sovereign: Chief Coin of the World (second ed.). Llantrisant, Wales, United Kingdom: Royal Mint Museum. ISBN 978-1-869917-00-5.
- Craig, John (2010) [1953]. The Mint: a History of the London Mint from A.D. 287 to 1948 (paperback ed.). Cambridge, United Kingdom: Cambridge University Press. ISBN 978-0-521-17077-2.
- Dyer, G.P.; Gaspar, P.P. (1992). "Reform, the New Technology and Tower Hill". In Challis, C.E. (ed.). A New History of the Royal Mint. Cambridge, United Kingdom: Cambridge University Press. pp. 398–606. ISBN 978-0-521-24026-0.
- Dyer, G. P.; Stocker, Mark (1984). "Edgar Boehm and the Jubilee Coinage" (PDF). British Numismatic Journal. 54: 274–288.
- Elliott, Thomas Henry (1916). Forty-fifth Annual Report of the Deputy Master of the Mint. London: His Majesty's Stationery Office. OCLC 749400447.
- Forrer, Leonard, ed. (1923). Biographical Dictionary of Medallists. Vol. VII. London: Spink & Son Ltd. OCLC 739150212.
- Garside, Henry (January–February 1915). "Sir C. W. Fremantle". The Numismatic Circular: 47.
- Julian, R.W. (Spring 2008). "The Hayes Presidential Medal". The Centinel. 56 (1). The Central States Numismatic Society: 32–37 – via Newman Numismatic Portal.
- Lant, Jeffrey L. (1973). "The Jubilee Coinage of 1887" (PDF). British Numismatic Journal. 43: 132–141.
- Lee, Sidney, ed. (1901). "Fremantle, Thomas Francis (1798-1890)" . Dictionary of National Biography (1st supplement). Vol. 2. London: Smith, Elder & Co. pp. 251–253.
- Moon, George Washington, ed. (1891). Men and Women of the Time: A Dictionary of Contemporaries. London: George Routledge & Sons. p. 343. OCLC 5094800.
- Seaby, Peter (1985). The Story of British Coinage. London: B. A. Seaby Ltd. ISBN 978-0-900652-74-5.
- Seymour, Horace (1895). Twenty-fifth Annual Report of the Deputy Master of the Mint. London: Her Majesty's Stationery Office. OCLC 941867253.
- Yeoman, R. S. (2020). A Guide Book of United States Coins (Mega Red 5th ed.). Atlanta, Georgia, U.S.: Whitman Publishing, LLC. ISBN 978-0-7948-4705-0.
