= Cottesloe (disambiguation) =

Cottesloe, Western Australia is suburb of Perth.

Cottesloe may also refer to:

== Australia ==
- Cottesloe railway station, on the Transperth Fremantle line
- Town of Cottesloe, local government area and suburb of Perth
- Electoral district of Cottesloe, an electorate of the Western Australian Legislative Assembly

== United Kingdom ==
- Cottesloe Hundred, a former hundred in Buckinghamshire
- Cottesloe School, formerly known as Wing County Secondary School, Wing, Buckinghamshire
- Cottesloe Theatre, part of the Royal National Theatre at the South Bank Centre, London
- Baron Cottesloe, a title in the peerage of the United Kingdom
  - Thomas Fremantle, 1st Baron Cottesloe (1798–1890), after whom Cottesloe, Western Australia was named
  - Thomas Fremantle, 2nd Baron Cottesloe (1830–1918), British businessman and Conservative politician
  - Thomas Fremantle, 3rd Baron Cottesloe (1862–1956), British peer and sportsman
  - John Fremantle, 4th Baron Cottesloe (1900–1994), (Lord Cottesloe), after whom the theatre was named
  - John Fremantle, 5th Baron Cottesloe (1927–2018), British baron

== Elsewhere ==
- Cottesloe, part of the township of Douro-Dummer, Ontario, Canada
- Cottesloe, suburb of Johannesburg, South Africa
