= List of barons of Austria-Hungary =

This article gives an incomplete list of baronial families in the territories of the Austro-Hungarian Empire, whether extant or extinct. They held no style, but were normally addressed as Gnädiger Herr (Gracious Lord), Gnädige Frau, or Gnädiges Fräulein (Gracious Lady). Titles of nobility were formally abolished in Austria in 1919.

The German forms of the titles are Freiherr (baron), Freifrau (baroness, wife of a baron) and Freiin (baroness, daughter of a baron).

Preposition	Original name	Current name	Notes
von	Arnstein	Arnstein	
von	Asztalos	Asztalos	
von	Augustin	Augustin	
von	Auspitz	Auspitz	
von	Bach	Bach	
von	Berg	Berg	
von	Cornaro	Cornaro	
	Czedik von Bründlsberg und Eysenberg	Czedik-Eysenberg	
von	Doblhoff-Dier	Doblhoff-Dier	
von	Drasche-Wartinberg	Drasche-Wartinberg	
von	Eskeles	Eskeles	
von	Ferstl	Ferstl	
von	Fraydenegg	Fraydenegg	
	Fremantle	Fremantle	Created for the distinguished British Admiral Sir Thomas Fremantle. His eldest son and successor, Thomas, later became a baronet and eventually the Baron Cottesloe in the Peerage of the United Kingdom.
von	Froelichstal	Froelichstal	
von	Gagern		
von	Gomperz	Gomperz	
von	Haas	Haas	
von	Hess	Hess	
von	Helfert	Helfert	
von	Hofkirchen		extinct since 1692
von	In der Maur auf Strelburg und zu Freifeld	Indermaur	
von	Isbury		
	Jäger von Waldau	Waldau	
	Jörger von Tollet		extinct since 1772
	Kalchegger von Kalchberg		
	Kiss von Ittebe		also Kiß von Ittebe
von	Kubinzky	Kubinzky	
von	Kuffner	Kuffner	
von	Laudon	Laudon	
von	Leitenberger	Leitenberger	
von	Lieben	Lieben	
	Mayr von Melnhof	Mayr-Melnhof	
von	Menshengen	Menshengen	
de	Neumann	von Neumann	
von	Oppenheimer	Oppenheimer	
von	Pace	Pace von Friedensberg	
von	Parnegg	Parnau	
von	Pereira-Arnstein	Pereira-Arnstein	
von	Prandau		
von	Riefel	Riefel	
von	Ringhoffer	Ringhoffer	
von	Rodich	Rodić, von Rodich	Gavrilo Rodić was an ethnic Serb Lieutenant field marshal of the Austro-Hungarian Army and Governor of the Kingdom of Dalmatia. He was conferred the title of Baron by the emperor and the family name was changed to von Rodich.
von	Rόna	Ronai	Herman Weinberger was the chief Supply Officer of the Austro-Hungarian Army. In 1867, he was conferred the title of "Baron von Rona" by Emperor Franz Joseph. The Jewish last name (Weinberger) was later dropped, and Ronai (meaning "von Rόna") was adopted as the family name.
von	Rothschild	Rothschild	this family had several branches; also used the preposition de
	Schey		this family may have had several branches (Schey; Schey von Koromla)
	Schmelzer von Ehrenruef		also Schmelzern von Widsmannsegg, or Schmelzern von Wildsmannsegg
von	Sina	Sina	
zu	Stübing	Stübing	
	Thavonat-Thavon	Thavonat-Thavon	
von	Todesco	Todesco	
von	Wehrborn	Wagner-Wehrborn	
von	Widmannsegg		Schmeltzern von Wildemannsek the same as Wilmannsegg
von	Wertheimstein	Wertheimstein	

Where this section is blank, it is possible that the preposition is unknown or did not exist.
