= Stephen Grenville Fremantle =

British naval officer

Stephen Grenville Fremantle (1810 – 18 April 1860) was a naval officer in the Royal Navy.

He was the youngest son of Vice-Admiral Sir Thomas Fremantle. His brothers were Thomas, Charles and William. In 1823 he attended the Royal Naval Academy, Portsmouth, and then in 1828 served as midshipman on HMS Challenger followed by HMS Pallas. In 1829 was promoted to lieutenant then, in 1836, to commander on HMS Clio, Southampton and HMS Wanderer at the Cape of Good Hope and on the South America Station and in China respectively.

In 1842, while on the Wanderer he was promoted to captain. He served in North America, before being appointed to HMS Arrogant in 1852 on the Home Station.

He commanded HMS Juno on the Australian Station from 1853 to 1857. In 1857 he annexed the Cocos (Keeling) Islands to the British Empire. Accused of over-strict discipline he had no further employment.

He is buried in St Swithun's Churchyard, Swanbourne, Buckinghamshire, where his family was established.
