= John Fremantle, 4th Baron Cottesloe =

British aristocrat and public official

John Fremantle
- Fremantle in 1959

Member of the London County Council from Hampstead
- In office 31 July 1945 – 1955
- Preceded by: Sydney Copeman

Personal details
- Born: 2 March 1900 Holton, England, British Empire
- Died: 21 April 1994 (aged 94) Kingston, England, United Kingdom
- Party: Conservative
- Spouses: Elizabeth Harris (m. 1926; div. 1944) Gloria Dunn (m. 1959)
- Children: John, Ann, Edward, Elizabeth, and Flora
- Parent(s): Thomas Fremantle; Frances Tapling
- Education: University of Cambridge (MA)

Military service
- Allegiance: United Kingdom
- Years of service: 1939-1965

John Walgrave Halford Fremantle, 4th Baron Cottesloe, 5th Baron Fremantle, GBE, TD (2 March 1900 – 21 April 1994) was a British aristocrat and public official. He served as the Chairman of the Arts Council of Great Britain and the South Bank Theatre Board.

== Biography ==
=== Early life ===
John Fremantle was born at Holton Park, Oxfordshire, on 2 March 1900. He was the son of Colonel Thomas Fremantle and his wife Frances Tapling, the daughter of industrialist Thomas Tapling Senior and sister of MP Thomas Tapling. He was educated at New Beacon, Eton, and Trinity College, Cambridge. At Cambridge, he was a member of the University Pitt Club. He rowed for the Cambridge University Boat Club in both the Boat Race of 1921 and the Boat Race of 1922, winning both times, and graduated from Cambridge in 1925 with a Master of Arts (MA).

=== Career ===
He served as Lieutenant-Colonel of the 21st LAA Regiment, Royal Artillery from 1939 to 1965 and served in World War 2, being awarded the Territorial Decoration.

He was a Conservative Party member of the London County Council representing Hampstead from 1945 until 1955.

He succeeded to the title Baron Fremantle and Baron Cottesloe on the death of his father on 19 July 1956. He was a Deputy Lieutenant of London from 1951 to 1976 and was invested as a Knight Grand Cross, Order of the British Empire (G.B.E.) in 1960. He was Chairman of the Arts Council of Great Britain from 1960 to 1965.

The Cottesloe, one of the three theatres at the National Theatre complex in London, was named in his honour.

=== Personal life ===
He married, firstly, Lady Elizabeth Harris, daughter of James Harris and Dorothy Gough-Calthorpe, on 16 February 1926. Lady Harris was a distant cousin of Fremantle through their shared British North American ancestry - both were descendant of different members of the Dutch American Schuyler family who were Loyalists during the American Revolutionary War.

They had two children:

- John Fremantle, 5th Baron Cottesloe (1927–2018)
- Hon. Ann Fremantle, m. Sir Timothy Brooks

Lord Cottesloe and Lady Elizabeth divorced in 1944.

He married, secondly, Gloria Jean Irene Dunn, daughter of W. E. Hill, on 26 March 1959. They had three children:

- Hon. Edward Fremantle
- Hon. Elizabeth Fremantle
- Hon. Flora Fremantle

He died in 1994.

== Ancestry ==
Ancestors of John Fremantle, 4th Baron Cottesloe

Thomas Fremantle
Thomas Fremantle
Louisa Elizabeth
Thomas Fremantle
John Fremantle; 1900-1994
Thomas Tapling
Frances Tapling

== See also ==
- List of Cambridge University Boat Race crews

Peerage of the United Kingdom
Preceded by Thomas Fremantle	Baron Cottesloe; 1956–1994	Succeeded by John Fremantle
Titles of nobility of the Austrian Empire
Preceded by Thomas Fremantle	Baron Fremantle; 1956–1994	Succeeded by John Fremantle
