= Thomas Fremantle, 3rd Baron Cottesloe =

British aristocrat and rifle shooter (1862–1956)

The Right Honourable The Lord Cottesloe CB KStJ VD TD DL JP
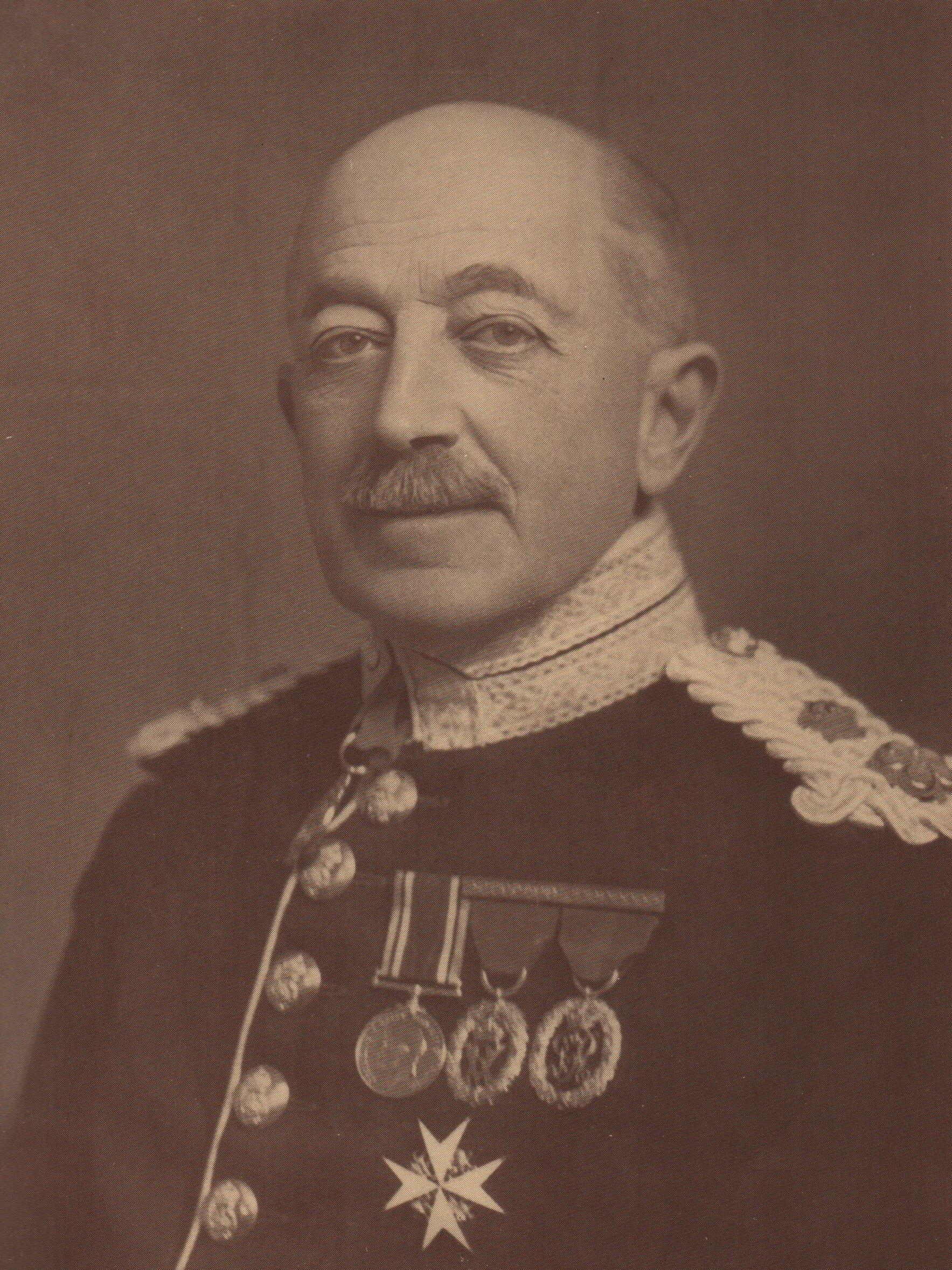
- Photograph of Lord Cottesloe from the 1938 Slough Charter of Incorporation

Member of the House of Lords
- Lord Temporal
- as a hereditary peer 13 April 1918 – 9 July 1956
- Preceded by: Thomas Fremantle, 2nd Baron Cottesloe
- Succeeded by: John Fremantle, 4th Baron Cottesloe

Personal details
- Born: Thomas Francis Fremantle; 5 February 1862
- Died: 9 July 1956 (aged 94) Swanbourne, Buckinghamshire, England
- Spouse: Florence Tapling (m. 1896; died 1956)
- Children: Thomas, John, Margaret, and 5 others
- Parent: Thomas Fremantle (father)
- Relatives: Charles William Fremantle (uncle); St John Brodrick (cousin)
- Education: Eton College; Balliol College, Oxford

Thomas Francis Fremantle, 3rd Baron Cottesloe, 4th Baron Fremantle (/ˈkɒtsloʊ/, COT-sloh; 5 February 1862 – 9 July 1956), was a British peer and rifle shooter. Regarded among the foremost marksmen of his day, he competed for Great Britain in the 1908 Summer Olympics, and captained Great Britain in several international matches. He was also a long-time member of the English Eight rifle team, shooting for, coaching and captaining England in the Elcho match for a total of more than sixty years.

The eldest son of Thomas Fremantle, 2nd Baron Cottesloe, Fremantle was educated at Eton College, where he showed an early aptitude for shooting, and at Balliol College, Oxford. He first made the final of the Queen's Prize, the most prestigious competition in British rifle shooting, while still an undergraduate. In 1885, the year after he left Oxford, he first represented England in the Elcho, and he went on to captain Great Britain in the International Rifle Match, the Empire Match and the Palma Match. He was also prominent in the administration of British shooting, becoming assistant secretary to the British National Rifle Association (NRA) in 1889 and helping to oversee the NRA's move to Bisley Camp in Surrey. He served as the NRA's chairman between 1931 and 1939.

Fremantle became an officer in the Volunteer Force in 1881. He served as a volunteer aide-de-camp to Garnet Wolseley, the Commander-in-Chief of the Forces, and between 1900 and 1903 as an Assistant Private Secretary to his cousin St John Brodrick, the Secretary of State for War. He conducted research into ballistics alongside his mentor Henry St John Halford and the engineers William Ellis Metford and Arthur Mallock, and published several books on the history and design of firearms, on which he was considered a leading expert. He was made an associate member of the Board of Ordnance and chairman of the War Office Small Arms Committee. During the First World War, he was head of the Territorial Association, which represented the army's reserve units. He was also an amateur poet; he published a volume of his verse in 1950, which included poems about Bisley and rifle shooting.

Fremantle's eldest son, Thomas, was killed in the First World War; upon his own death in 1956, Fremantle's titles passed to his second son, John. Among Fremantle's four daughters was Margaret Jennings, a researcher into penicillin under Howard Florey. He donated several of the NRA's trophies and left the association £1,000 (equivalent to £22,000 in 2025) for the promotion of shooting competitions to support the development of long-range rifles.

== Early life and education ==
Thomas Francis Fremantle was born on 5 February 1862. He was the eldest son of Thomas Fremantle, 2nd Baron Cottesloe, and the great-grandson of Thomas Fremantle, an admiral of the Royal Navy who was awarded the Austrian title of Baron Fremantle. Charles William Fremantle, who became deputy master of the Royal Mint, was the second baron's brother, and so Thomas's paternal uncle. The Fremantles were granted the right to use their Austrian title in the United Kingdom by royal permission in 1822.

Fremantle was educated at Eton College, a public school in Berkshire, where he took up rifle shooting. In 1879, he attended the Imperial Meeting at Bisley in Surrey, the premier competition in fullbore shooting. (Note: Baily's Magazine, August 1892, p. 74. On the prestige of the Imperial Meeting, see Mackay 2005, chapter 4.) Using a Snider–Enfield rifle, he won the Wills Prize with a perfect score of ten bullseyes at 200 yards (180 m), and represented Eton in the Ashburton Shield, contested between the public schools of the United Kingdom. He shot in the Ashburton again in 1880, in which year his team won the competition.

After Eton, Fremantle studied at Balliol College, Oxford, between 1881 and 1884. He shot against Cambridge University in both the long-range Humphry Cup and the short-range Chancellors' Plate in each of his four years of study. Oxford won seven out of these eight matches; Fremantle's was the highest score in his debut Chancellor's match of 1881, and he submitted the top individual score in each Humphry match between 1882 and 1884. In 1884, his final year at the university, he made the final of the Queen's Prize, the most prestigious competition at the Imperial Meeting. (Note: The top sixty shots out of 2,200 entrants made the final.) He received his BA in 1885.

== Public life ==
Fremantle became an officer in the Volunteer Force in 1881, later moving to the Territorial Army when the Volunteers were amalgamated into it in 1908; he was awarded both the Volunteer Officers' Decoration (in 1901) and the Territorial Decoration. He was promoted to lieutenant on 25 November 1882, and was a captain by the end of 1884. In 1889, he qualified as a military marksmanship instructor, and by 1892 was acting as the shooting instructor for his unit, the 1st Buckinghamshire Rifle Volunteer Corps, itself under the command of the Oxfordshire Light Infantry. By 1899, he was a volunteer aide-de-camp to Garnet Wolseley, the Commander-in-Chief of the Forces. He became a lieutenant colonel by 1915, (Note: For his full rank, see "No. 33618". The London Gazette. 24 June 1930. p. 3956. For the date, see McCartney 2005, pp. 71–72.) and was made an honorary colonel by 1919.

Fremantle became in 1900 an unpaid Assistant Private Secretary to his cousin St John Brodrick, the Secretary of State for War, and remained in post until 1903. (Note: McCartney 2005, p. 72. For the relationship between Fremantle and Brodrick, see Debrett's, 1896, p. 19.) In this capacity, he was sent in 1900 to make a report on the standards of safety at European shooting ranges. He also served as an associate member of the Board of Ordnance and as chairman of the War Office Small Arms Committee. During the First World War, as head of the Territorial Association representing the army's reserve battalions, he unsuccessfully attempted to prevent the assignment of recruits from Buckinghamshire to regiments of other counties and the disbandment of Buckinghamshire battalions. By this point, he had lost much of his former influence in the government and military.

By the early 1890s, Fremantle was a county councillor for Buckinghamshire. In 1911, he was appointed a deputy lieutenant of the county. He became the third Baron Cottesloe on his father's death in 1918. From 1923 to 1954, he was lord-lieutenant of Buckinghamshire; (Note: Appointment: "No. 32845". The London Gazette. 17 July 1923. p. 4920. Resignation: "No. 40219". The London Gazette. 29 June 1954. p. 3829. (resignation).) he also served as president of the County Councils Association. In 1925, he was made a Knight of Grace of the Order of Saint John, and promoted to a Knight of Justice in 1930. He was made a Companion of the Order of the Bath at some point between 1925 and January 1928. (Note: His name appears without the "C.B." postnominals in the London Gazette of 23 June 1925,, and with them in the edition of 24 January 1928.) He also served as a justice of the peace and as a county alderman.

== Shooting career ==
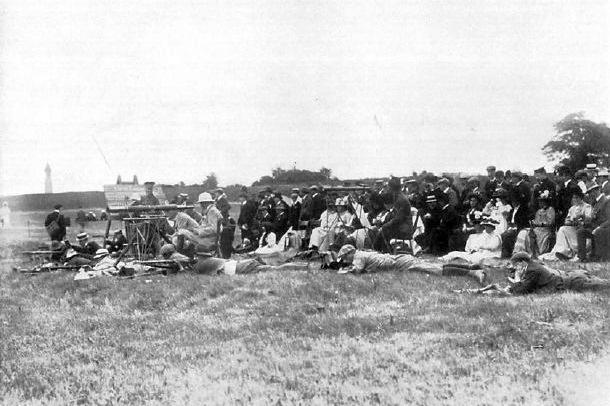
The British team at 1,000 yards (910 m) in the free rifle event at the 1908 Olympics, held at Bisley

A 1956 obituary described Fremantle as "one of the finest shots Britain has ever known". He made the final of the Queen's Prize again in 1893 and in 1921. He first competed for the English Eight, the match rifle team representing England in the international competition between the Home Nations for the Elcho Shield, in 1885. He went on to be part of the team for over sixty years, acting as a firer for 27 years, as its wind coach, and as its captain from 1920 until 1954. In June 1899, he captained a Great Britain team in the International Rifle Match, held at The Hague in Holland. Great Britain placed seventh out of eight teams: their poor performance was blamed on difficult range conditions, their choice of the Lee–Metford service rifle, and their decision to focus on shooting from the standing position. (Note: Cornfield 1987, p. 85; The North West Post, 24 June 1899, p. 3 (for the date and the rifles).)

Fremantle also captained the victorious Great Britain team in the 1902 Palma Match, contested at Rockliffe near Ottawa between Great Britain, the United States, Canada, Australia and Ireland, and the Great Britain team which placed second in the match at Bisley the following year. (Note: The Times, 20 July 1956, p. 13; Barde 1961, p. 16 (for the 1903 result).) He was also captain of the British team, which included Arthur Fulton and P. W. Richardson, for the 1908 International Match, held at Bisley. Great Britain placed second, 34 points behind the United States and 59 points ahead of Canada: Fremantle credited the American victory to their use of novel aperture rearsights, while the American captain described the British team as the strongest he had competed against.

From 1887, Fremantle began to conduct research into ballistics, together with the engineer William Ellis Metford and Henry St John Halford, another aristocratic rifleman who became his mentor. Halford built a 1,000-yard (910 m) rifle range on his family estate, Wistow Hall, in Leicestershire, including an iron target and a ballistic pendulum hut. (Note: A ballistic pendulum is used to measure the momentum, and thereby the velocity, of rounds impacting it.) There, he, Fremantle and Metford carried out experiments into the trajectories of rounds fired from different weapons at up to 2,000 yards (1,800 m), the results of which led to the adoption of breech-loading rifles by the British military in place of muzzle-loading weapons.

When Halford died in 1897, he left Wistow Hall to Fremantle, and Fremantle continued the ballistic trials they had jointly carried out. (Note: The results of some of these experiments were published as Mallock 1904.) Along with Metford, he developed a new form of ballistic pendulum, which he outlined to fellow shooters at the 1904 Imperial Meeting. In 1909 and 1911, working with the engineer Arthur Mallock, Fremantle devised a method to establish the maximum range of the Short Magazine Lee–Enfield when firing Mark VII ammunition. He came to be regarded as one of the foremost experts on the history and design of rifles, and wrote several articles on the topic for Baily's Magazine, which he collated into his 1896 book Notes on the Rifle. He also served as president of the Society for Army Historical Research and contributed to several editions of the Text Book of Small Arms, published by the War Office.

Fremantle became assistant secretary to the British National Rifle Association (NRA) in 1889, reporting to Alfred Paget Humphry, the association's secretary. He played an important role in the association's move from Wimbledon Common to Bisley Camp, first used for the 1890 Imperial Meeting, which was overseen by Humphry. Fremantle was elected to the NRA's governing council in 1891. He was appointed by the association to the committee organising the programme for the shooting events at the 1908 Summer Olympics, which were held at Bisley. He shot there in the 1000-yard free rifle event, placing joint sixteenth with a score of 87 out of 100. Having previously served as vice-chairman of the NRA, he was its chairman between 1931 and 1939.

In the 1910 Empire Match, for which Fremantle served as captain and coach, Great Britain won by 72 points with a score of 2,177; he was also captain for the British victory in 1912. He frequently represented the House of Lords in the Vizianagram Match, contested against the House of Commons. He continued to shoot at Bisley until 1946, by which point he was 84 years old. Several trophies awarded for NRA competitions, including a cup in memory of Halford, were donated by Fremantle. He also organised the first collection of small arms at Bisley, which became the NRA museum.

== Personal life and issue ==
I've held my own among the best,
Long range and short, in many a fray;
I've joined the never-ending quest
To learn why bullets go astray;
I've watched the flickering pennants gay
As, strong or soft, the breeze runs by;
Once more the summons I'll obey,
I'll go to Bisley in July.

ENVOI

Friend, I will strive while yet I may,
And with my old companions vie
Ere the world's welcome I outstay;
I'll go to Bisley in July.

— Fremantle, from "The Old Marksman" (1950)

Fremantle was an amateur poet: his ballad The Old Marksman was published in English, the journal of the English Association, in 1950, and a collected volume of his poetry, titled Verses, appeared later that year. A reviewer for English described the collection as marrying new themes with classical models, and wrote of one entry, a long poem titled Purbeck after the area of Dorset Fremantle visited as a child, that "the verse often rises to majestic quality ... and throughout preserves a haunting elegiac strain."

Fremantle resided at Swanbourne House in Swanbourne in Buckinghamshire. He died there on 9 July 1956, (Note: The Times, 20 July 1956, p. 13. For the place, see The Londonderry Sentinel, 21 July 1956, p. 4.) and left an estate valued at £205,966 (equivalent to £4,461,590 in 2025), and bequeathed £1,000 (equivalent to £22,000 in 2025) to the British National Rifle Association, to be invested and the proceeds used to fund competitions which would support the development of better long-range rifles. He was succeeded as Lord Cottesloe by his second son, John Fremantle.

Fremantle married Florence Tapling, daughter of the industrialist Thomas Tapling, in 1896. They had four sons and four daughters. Their eldest son, Thomas Fremantle, was born in 1897 and followed his father to Eton, where he won an academic scholarship, represented the college in shooting in 1913 and 1914, and won academic prizes for poetry and chemistry. The younger Thomas left Eton early, at the age of 17, to take a commission in the Oxfordshire and Buckinghamshire Light Infantry in September 1914; he died, on 17 October 1915, of wounds sustained on 25 September during an attack in support of the Battle of Loos. Their third son died in childhood, and Florence died in April 1956. One of their daughters, Margaret, was a researcher into penicillin under Howard Florey, whose second wife she became in 1967.

== Published works ==
- Fremantle, Thomas (1896). Notes on the Rifle. London: Vinton. OL 19660258M – via Internet Archive.
- — (1901). The Book of the Rifle. London: Longmans, Green & Co. OCLC 4773639.
- Humphry, Alfred Paget; Fremantle, Thomas (1914). History of the National Rifle Association During Its First Fifty Years, 1859–1909. Cambridge: Bowes. OCLC 59332201.
- Jones, Frederick William; Fremantle, Thomas (1925). The Hodsock Ballistic Tables for Rifles. London: E. Arnold and Co. OCLC 12291606.
- Fremantle, Thomas (1946). The Englishman and the Rifle. London: H. Jenkins. OCLC 4773639.
- Lord Cottesloe (1950). "The Old Marksman". English: Journal of the English Association. 8 (43): 21. doi:10.1093/english/8.43.21.
- Fremantle, Thomas (1950). Verses. London: Jordan and Sons. OL 61370373M.
- Lord Cottesloe (1951). Purbeck and Other Poems. London: Jordan and Sons. ASIN B0017ROBQE.

== Works cited ==
- Abraham, A. P. (November 1971). "Howard Walter Florey. Baron Florey of Adelaide and Marston. 1898–1968". Biographical Memoirs of Fellows of the Royal Society. 17. doi:10.1098/rsbm.1971.0011. ISSN 1748-8494. JSTOR 769709. PMID 11615426. S2CID 29766722.
- Barde, Robert E. (1961). History of Marine Corps Competitive Marksmanship. Washington, D.C.: US Marine Corps. OCLC 602073042.
- Beckett, Ian (1985). "The Territorial Force". In Beckett, Ian; Simpson, Keith (eds.). A Nation in Arms: A Social Study of the British Army in the First World War. University of Manchester Press. ISBN 0-7190-1737-8.
- C. B. (1950). "Poetry Review". English: Journal of the English Association. 8 (46): 213–215. doi:10.1093/english/8.46.213-b.
- Cook, Theodore Andrea (1908). The Fourth Olympiad, Being the Official Report. London: British Olympic Association. OCLC 7896708.
- Cornfield, Susie (1987). The Queen's Prize: The Story of the National Rifle Association. London: Pelham. ISBN 0-7207-1751-5.
- "Death of Lord Cottesloe at Age of 94". Buckingham Advertiser and Free Press. 21 July 1956. p. 1 – via British Newspaper Archive.
- Debrett's Illustrated House of Commons, and the Judicial Bench (30th ed.). London: Dean and Son. 1896. OCLC 47093641 – via Google Books.
- Doyle, Michael (2014). "2nd Lieutenant Thomas Francis Halford Fremantle". Leicestershire War Memorials Project. Leicestershire County Council. Archived from the original on 19 September 2024 – via Internet Archive.
- Foster, Joseph (1891). "Fremantle, Thomas Francis". Alumni Oxonienses: the Members of the University of Oxford, 1715–1886. p. 495. OCLC 19916805 – via Wikisource.
- Gauld, Colin F. (2005). "Pendulums in the Physics Education Literature: A Bibliography". In Matthews, Michael R.; Gauld, Colin F.; Stinner, Arthur (eds.). The Pendulum: Scientific, Historical and Educational Perspectives. Dordrecht: Springer. pp. 505–526. ISBN 1-4020-3526-8.
- Gibbs, Robert (1888). Worthies of Buckinghamshire and Men of Note of that County. Aylesbury: Robert Gibbs. OL 54278881M.
- Gliddon, Gerald (2002). The Aristocracy and the Great War. Norwich: Gliddon Books. ISBN 0-947893-35-0.
- "Hon. Thomas Francis Fremantle". Baily's Magazine of Sports and Pastimes. Vol. 58. August 1892. pp. 73–74.
- "International Rifle Match". The North West Post. 24 June 1899. p. 3.
- Jones, Daniel (2011). Cambridge English Pronouncing Dictionary. Cambridge University Press. ISBN 978-0-521-76575-6.
- "Left Money for the Improvement of Rifles". Coventry Evening Telegraph. 29 August 1956. p. 11 – via British Newspaper Archive.
- "Leicestershire and the War". Leicester Daily Post. 18 November 1915. p. 5 – via British Newspaper Archive.
- "Lord Cottesloe". The Londonderry Sentinel. 21 July 1956. p. 4 – via British Newspaper Archive.
- "Lord Cottesloe". The Times. 20 July 1956. p. 13 – via Gale Primary Sources.
- Macfarlane, Gwyn (1979). Howard Florey, the Making of a Great Scientist. Oxford University Press. ISBN 0-19-858161-0.
- Mackay, Francis (2005). Overture to Overlord: Special Operations in Preparation for D-Day. Barnsley: Pen and Sword. ISBN 0-85052-892-5.
- Mair, Robert H., ed. (1884). Debrett's Peerage, Baronetage, Knightage and Companionage. London: Dean and Son. OCLC 17517290 – via Google Books.
- Mallock, Arthur (1904). "Air Resistance Encountered by Projectiles at Velocities up to 4500 Feet per Second". Proceedings of the Royal Society of London. 74: 267–270. ISSN 0370-1662. JSTOR 116680.
- Martin, Janet D. (1964). "Wistow". In Lee, J. M.; McKinley, R. A. (eds.). A History of the County of Leicester. Vol. 5: Gartree Hundred. London: Oxford University Press. pp. 336–346. OCLC 609758907.
- McCartney, Helen B. (2005). Citizen Soldiers: The Liverpool Territorials in the First World War (PDF). Cambridge University Press. ISBN 978-1-139-44809-3.
- McKinley, R. A. (1964). "Kibworth". In Lee, J. M.; McKinley, R. A. (eds.). A History of the County of Leicester. Vol. 5: Gartree Hundred. London: Oxford University Press. pp. 167–186. OCLC 609758907.
- Rysden, Ogier, ed. (1900). The Book of Blues. London: F. E. Robinson & Co. OCLC 1071263989.
- Walford, Edward (1919). The County Families of the United Kingdom. London: Spottiswoode, Ballantyne & Co. OCLC 11282889 – via Internet Archive.

Honorary titles
Preceded by The Marquess of Lincolnshire	Lord Lieutenant of Buckinghamshire; 1923–1954	Succeeded by Sir Henry Aubrey-Fletcher, Bt
Peerage of the United Kingdom
Preceded by Thomas Fremantle	Baron Cottesloe; 1918–1956	Succeeded by John Fremantle
Titles of nobility of the Austrian Empire
Preceded by Thomas Fremantle	Baron Fremantle; 1918–1956	Succeeded by John Fremantle
