= Selwyn Fremantle =

British colonial administrator (1869–1942)

Sir Selwyn Howe Fremantle CSI CIE VD (11 August 1869 – 16 March 1942) was a British administrator in India.

Fremantle was the son of Admiral Sir Edmund Fremantle, fourth son of Thomas Fremantle, 1st Baron Cottesloe. He was educated at Eton College and Magdalen College, Oxford, and joined the Indian Civil Service in 1890. He became settlement officer at Rai Bareli in 1895 and a magistrate and collector in 1903. He was appointed Registrar of Co-operative Societies in the United Provinces in 1907, Collector and Magistrate of Allahabad in 1913, Commissioner of Bareilly in 1918, Controller of Passages of the United Provinces in 1919, and Commissioner of Meerut in 1919. In 1920 he was appointed a member of the Council of the Lieutenant-Governor of the United Provinces and in 1921 he became a member of the Provincial Board of Revenue. He retired in 1925.

He was appointed Companion of the Order of the Indian Empire (CIE) in 1915 and Companion of the Order of the Star of India (CSI) in the 1920 New Year Honours, and was knighted in the 1925 Birthday Honours.

He died in hospital in Amersham, Buckinghamshire, of injuries sustained in a road accident on 13 March 1942 when his car overturned.
