= Timothy Brooks (Lord Lieutenant) =

English landowner, farmer, politician and public servant

Sir Timothy Gerald Martin Brooks, KCVO (1929–2014) was an English landowner, farmer, politician and public servant.

Brooks' father, the Hon. Herbert William Brooks (1890–1974), was a younger son of the 2nd Baron Crawshaw. After Eton College, he attended the Royal Agricultural College, completing a National Diploma in Agriculture in 1951. That year, he married the Hon. Ann Fremantle, daughter of the 4th Baron Cottesloe; when Lord Cottesloe died in 1958, she inherited Wistow Hall and its connected estate.

The couple spent many years renovating the hall, improving the estate's farms and organising the Wistow Rural Centre (which Brooks had established in 1953). Brooks became involved in local affairs, becoming a magistrate in 1960 and serving as the High Sheriff of Leicestershire for the 1979–80 year. He sat on Harborough District Council from 1975 to 1989 and chaired it in the 1983–84 year. In 1989, he was appointed Lord Lieutenant of Leicestershire. Between then and his retirement in 2003, he received two honorary degrees (from De Montfort University and the University of Leicester) and was appointed a Knight of the Order of Saint John.

On retiring, Brooks was appointed a Knight Commander of the Royal Victorian Order. He died in 2014. His son Richard served as High Sheriff of Leicestershire in 2012.
