= Elizabeth Wynne Fremantle =

English diarist

Elizabeth Wynne Fremantle (born Elizabeth Wynne; 19 April 1778 – 2 November 1857) was a British diarist. She was the main author of the extensive Wynne Diaries and wife of Royal Navy officer Thomas Fremantle, a close associate of Nelson.

== Life ==
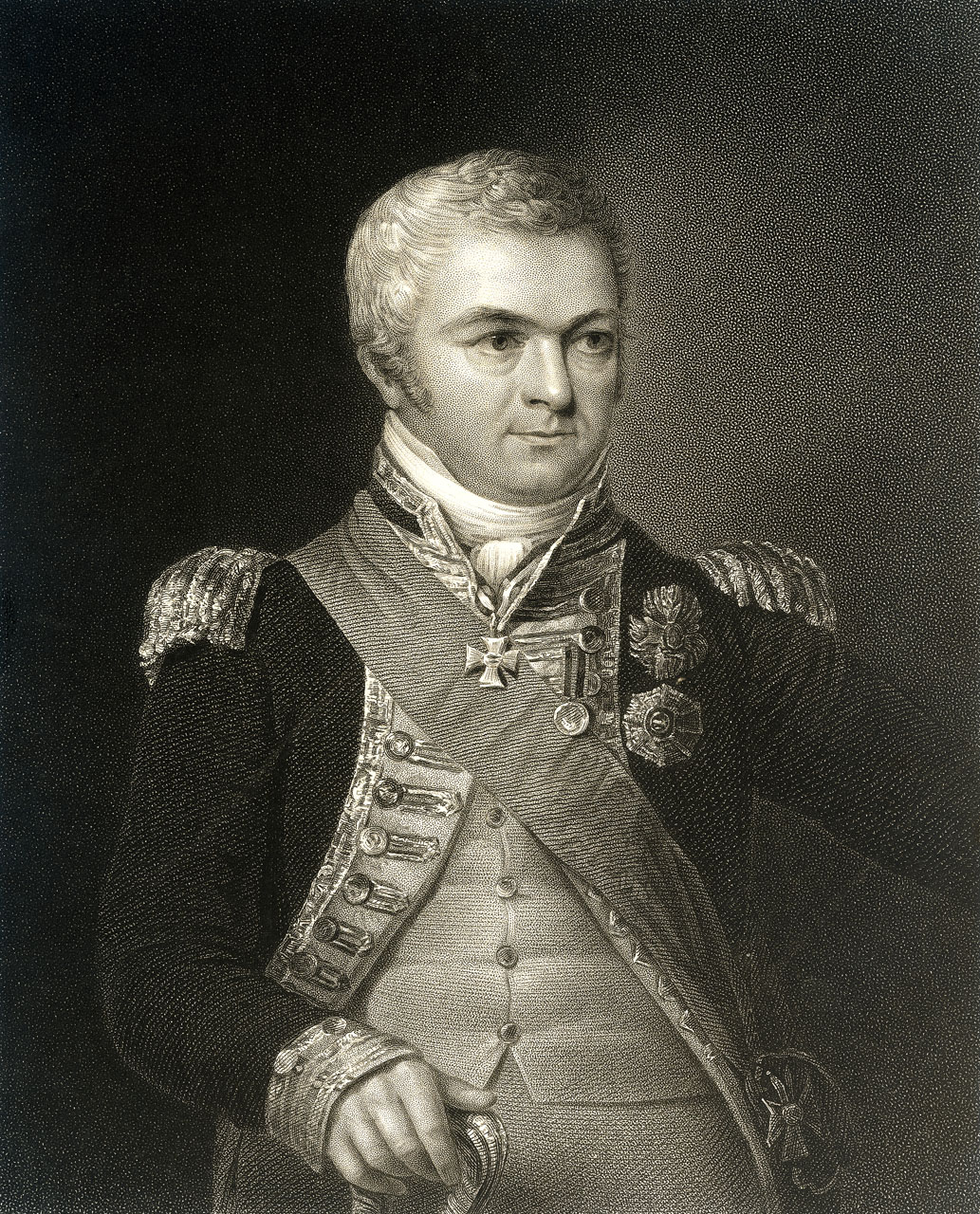
Thomas Fremantle, Elizabeth's husband

Known in the family as Betsey, she was born Elizabeth Wynne in Falkingham (present-day Folkingham), Lincolnshire. She was the second daughter of Richard Wynne (1744–1799) and his wife Camille (born de Royer, died 1799), who were Roman Catholics. Her father was a fast liver, later a friend of Giacomo Casanova. He got into financial difficulties in 1786, sold his Lincolnshire estate, and took his family abroad. Elizabeth married Thomas Fremantle in 1797, after he had rescued her and her family from Livorno in 1796 during the French Revolutionary Army's advances as part of the Italian campaign of 1796–1797 and taken them to safety in Corsica. The marriage took place in Naples on 12 January 1797, at the house of the British envoy, Sir William and Lady Hamilton, who took care of the arrangements.

Fremantle bought the manor of Swanbourne, Buckinghamshire, for his family in 1798 for 900 guineas. Elizabeth lived there for the rest of her life. The Fremantles' children included: Thomas (1798–1890), a Tory politician later created 1st Baron Cottesloe; a daughter Emma (born 13 June 1799); Charles (1800–1869), a Royal Navy officer after whom the city of Fremantle in Western Australia is named; William Robert (c. 1809–1895), who became Anglican dean of Ripon in Yorkshire; and Stephen Grenville Fremantle (1810–1860), captain in command of HMS Juno from 1853 to 1858.

Privately, Elizabeth lost sympathy with Lady Hamilton and Nelson when their conspicuous affair became known: "I had a letter from my husband today.... Lady Nelson is suing for a separate maintenance. I have no patience with her husband, at his age and such a cripple to play the fool with Lady Hamilton." Fremantle, in command of the Ganges, distinguished himself at the Battle of Copenhagen in 1801 under Nelson's command. He was also prominent at Trafalgar in 1805. Elizabeth bore her husband's absences at sea with difficulty, especially as her family grew. They kept up an intimate correspondence, which is spliced into the 1952 edition of the diaries. They received a good deal of hospitality from the family of Lord Buckingham, who lived nearby at Stowe. Buckingham as a figure close to the government was a help to Fremantle in his naval career. She died in or near Nice in France.

== The Wynne Diaries ==
Elizabeth began to keep her lifelong diaries in 1789, at the age of eleven. The early parts, which run from 1789 to 1857 in 41 manuscript volumes, provide a vivid and informative account of a well-connected English family in Europe (mainly in Germany and Italy). The bulk of them were written by Elizabeth, but diaries of her younger sisters Eugenia (born 1780) and Harriet (born 1786) have also survived. The first two years of Elizabeth's are in French and the rest in English, with some passages in French and German.

The diaries, except for one notebook covering part of 1796, which was lost at sea, were preserved by the Fremantle family, but remained unpublished until the 1930s. Swanbourne House is still owned by the Fremantle family trust, but now let to a coeducational prep school.

== Commemoration ==
The Betsey Wynne public house and restaurant in Swanbourne, Buckinghamshire, was built in 2006 by the Fremantle Trust, a body run by Thomas Henry Fremantle and his father John Fremantle, 5th Baron Cottesloe.

The building work cost almost £1 million. It was opened by Wynne's great-great-great granddaughter, Elizabeth Betsy Duncan Smith, and her husband, the politician Iain Duncan Smith.

English novelist Elizabeth Fremantle is Wynne's 5x great-granddaughter.
