= Thomas Fremantle, 2nd Baron Cottesloe =

British conservative politician (1830–1918)

The Lord Cottesloe
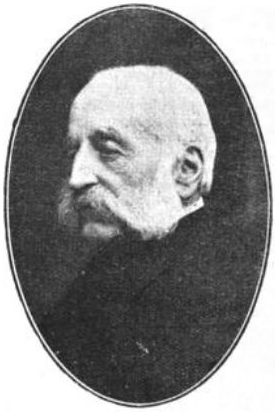
- Born: 30 January 1830
- Died: 13 April 1918 (aged 88); Winslow, Buckinghamshire, England
- Occupations: Politician; Businessman
- Spouse: Augusta Henrietta (m. 1859; died 1906)
- Children: Thomas Fremantle, 3rd Baron Cottesloe
- Parent(s): Thomas Fremantle, 1st Baron Cottesloe; Louisa Elizabeth
- Relatives: John Scott, 2nd Earl of Eldon (father-in-law)

Thomas Francis Fremantle, 2nd Baron Cottesloe, 3rd Baron Fremantle (30 January 1830 – 13 April 1918) was a British businessman and Conservative politician.

== Biography ==
=== Early life ===
Thomas Francis Fremantle was born on 30 January 1830. He was the eldest son of Thomas Fremantle, 1st Baron Cottesloe, and the grandson of Vice-Admiral Thomas Fremantle and Elizabeth Wynne Fremantle, the diarist. His mother was Louisa Elizabeth, daughter of Sir George Nugent and a descendant of the Schuyler family and the Van Cortlandt family of British North America.

=== Career ===
He entered Parliament as one of three representatives for Buckinghamshire in an 1876 by-election (succeeding the ennobled Benjamin Disraeli), a seat he held until 1885. He was also involved in business and became a director of the London, Brighton and South Coast Railway in January 1868, and served as its chairman from June 1896 to February 1908. He was chairman of the Buckinghamshire County Council until 1904.

=== Personal life and death ===
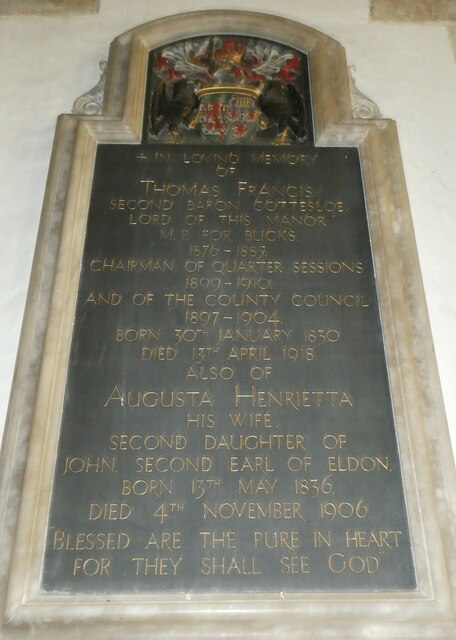
Memorial in St Swithun's, Swanbourne

He married Lady Augusta Henrietta, daughter of John Scott, 2nd Earl of Eldon, in 1859. She died in 1906. He survived her by twelve years and died at Swanbourne House, Winslow on 13 April 1918, at the age of eighty-eight. He was succeeded in his titles by his eldest son Thomas.

Parliament of the United Kingdom
Preceded by Benjamin Disraeli; Nathaniel Lambert; Sir Robert Harvey	Member of Parliament for Buckinghamshire; 1876–1885; With: Nathaniel Lambert 1876–1880; Sir Robert Harvey 1876–1885; Rupert Carington 1880–1885	Constituency abolished
Peerage of the United Kingdom
Preceded by Thomas Fremantle	Baron Cottesloe; 1890–1918	Succeeded by Thomas Fremantle
Titles of nobility of the Austrian Empire
Preceded by Thomas Fremantle	Baron Fremantle; 1890–1918	Succeeded by Thomas Fremantle
Business positions
Preceded by Samuel Laing	Chairman of the Board of Directors of the London, Brighton and South Coast Railway; 1896–1908	Succeeded by The Earl of Bessborough
