= John Fremantle, 5th Baron Cottesloe =

British baron

Commander The Right Honourable The Lord Cottesloe KStJ DL JP
- Born: 22 January 1927
- Died: 21 May 2018 (aged 91)
- Education: Summer Fields School; Eton College
- Occupation: Commander
- Employer: Royal Navy
- Spouse: Elizabeth Ann Barker
- Children: Elizabeth Wynne Fremantle; Frances Ann Fremantle; Thomas Henry Fremantle
- Parent: John Walgrave Halford Fremantle, 4th Baron Cottesloe
- Relatives: Henry Shelly Barker (father-in-law); Iain Duncan Smith (son-in-law)

Commander John Tapling Fremantle, 5th Baron Cottesloe, 6th Baron Fremantle, KStJ, DL, JP (22 January 1927 – 21 May 2018) was a British baron in the Peerage of the United Kingdom.

== Biography ==
=== Early life ===
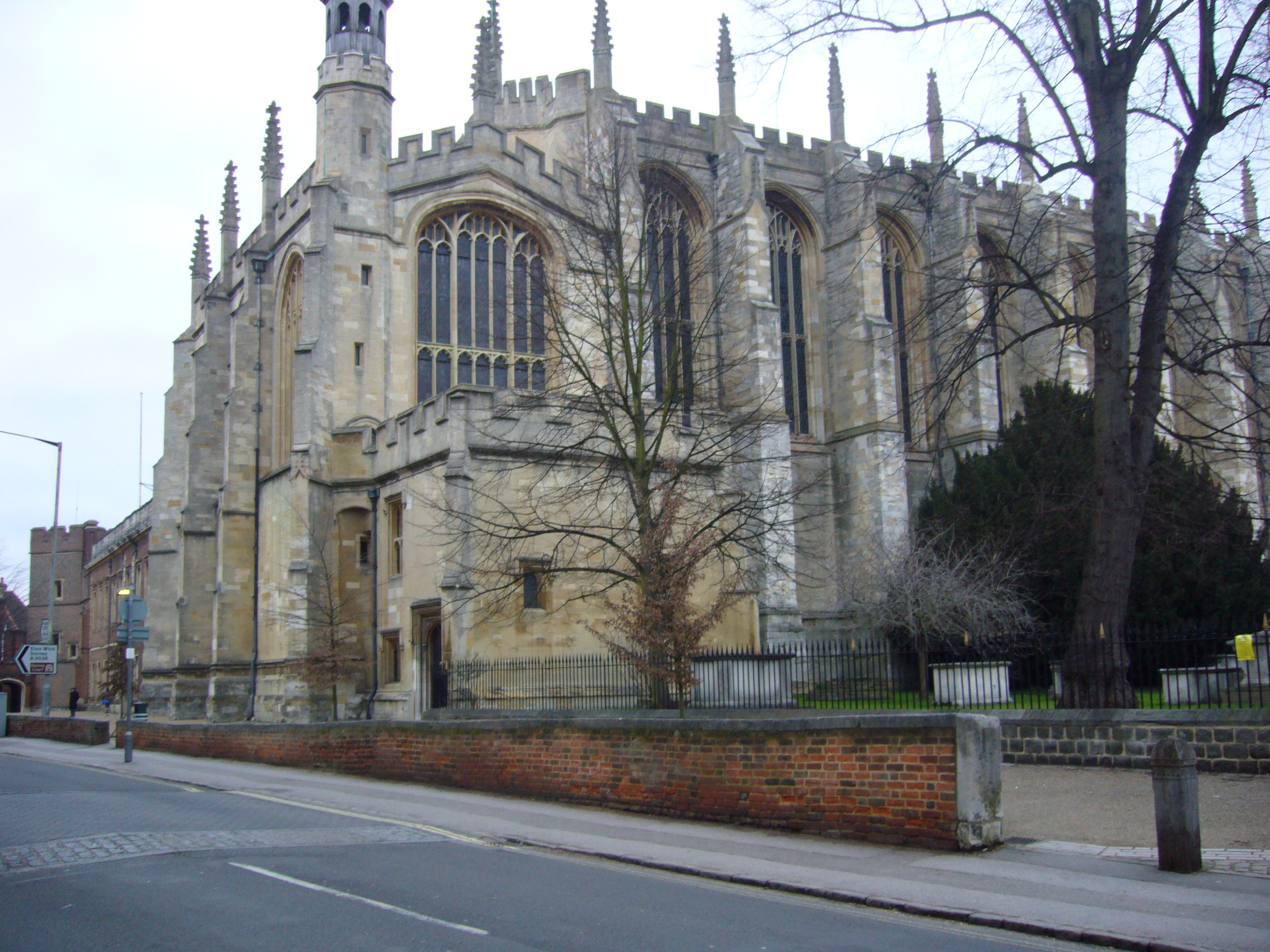
Eton College

John Fremantle was born on 22 January 1927, the son of John Walgrave Halford Fremantle, 4th Baron Cottesloe (1900–1994) and Lady Elizabeth Harris, daughter of James Edward Harris, 5th Earl of Malmesbury and Dorothy Gough-Calthorpe. Both his parents were descendants of American Loyalist members of the Dutch Schuyler and Van Cortlandt families of British North America.

Fremantle was educated at Summer Fields School and Eton College.

=== Career ===
He followed the family tradition set by his ancestor Admiral Thomas Fremantle and joined the Royal Navy in 1945. He commanded HMS Palliser between 1959 and 1961, retiring from the Navy in 1966 with the rank of Commander. He was High Sheriff of Buckinghamshire in 1969.

He inherited on the death of his father in 1994 the British peerage title Baron Cottesloe. He also inherited the Austrian noble title "Baron Fremantle", which was an authorized title in the United Kingdom for his lifetime by Warrant of 27 April 1932. He was Lord-Lieutenant of Buckinghamshire between 1984 and 1997.

A justice of the peace for Buckinghamshire from 1984, he resided at Swanbourne, where he was commonly referred to as 'The Commander'.

=== Personal life ===
He married Elizabeth Ann Barker (1930-2013), daughter of Lt.-Colonel Henry Shelly Barker, on 26 April 1958. They had two daughters and one son:

- Hon. Elizabeth Wynne Fremantle (b. 15 February 1959)
- Hon. Frances Ann Fremantle (b. 7 June 1961)
- Thomas Henry Fremantle, 6th Baron Cottesloe (b. 17 March 1966)

He was the father-in-law of Iain Duncan Smith, who is married to his daughter, Elizabeth "Betsy" Fremantle, and they have four children.

He died on 21 May 2018 at the age of 91.

Honorary titles
Preceded by John Young	Lord Lieutenant of Buckinghamshire; 1984–1997	Succeeded by Sir Nigel Mobbs
Peerage of the United Kingdom
Preceded by John Fremantle	Baron Cottesloe; 1994–2018	Succeeded by Thomas Fremantle
Titles of nobility of the Austrian Empire
Preceded by John Fremantle	Baron Fremantle; 1994–2018	Extinct
