= William Fremantle (Dean of Ripon, died 1916) =

English priest (1831–1916)

William Henry Fremantle (12 December 1831 – 24 December 1916) was an Anglican priest who served as Archdeacon of Maidstone in 1887, and as Dean of Ripon 1895–1915.

== Ecclesiastical career ==
The second son of Thomas Fremantle, 1st Baron Cottesloe, (and a nephew of William Fremantle, his predecessor at Ripon) he was educated at Eton and Balliol. A Fellow of All Souls College, Oxford, he was ordained in 1855 and two years later became Vicar of Lewknor. He was then Chaplain to Archibald Campbell Tait, Bishop of London, and went with him in the same post when he was appointed Archbishop of Canterbury seven years later. Appointed to be a Cathedral Canon at Canterbury in 1882, and Archdeacon of Maidstone in 1887, in 1895 he became Dean of Ripon. He retired in 1915 and died a year later on Christmas Eve 1916.

He was elected a Fellow of the Royal Botanic Society of London in 1902.

== Family ==
Fremantle married Isabella Maria Eardley, daughter of Sir Culling Eardley. Mrs. Fremantle took an active part in charitable work in the dioceses her husband was appointed to, and her work among the sick poor was well known. She died, aged 66, in July 1901.

Their second son Sir Francis Edward Fremantle was a Conservative politician.

A son, Henry Fremantle, was a South African academic and politician.

Church of England titles
Preceded by William Fremantle	Dean of Ripon; 1895 – 1915	Succeeded by Mansfield Owen
