= Swanbourne =

Village in Buckinghamshire, England

Coordinates: 51.938°N 0.834°W

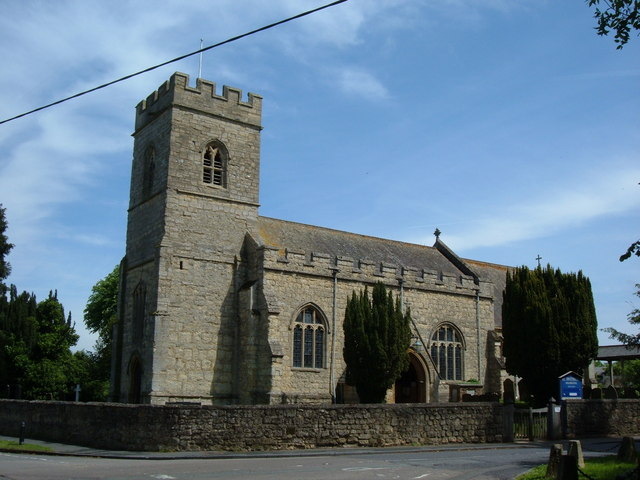
- St Swithun's Church, Swanbourne

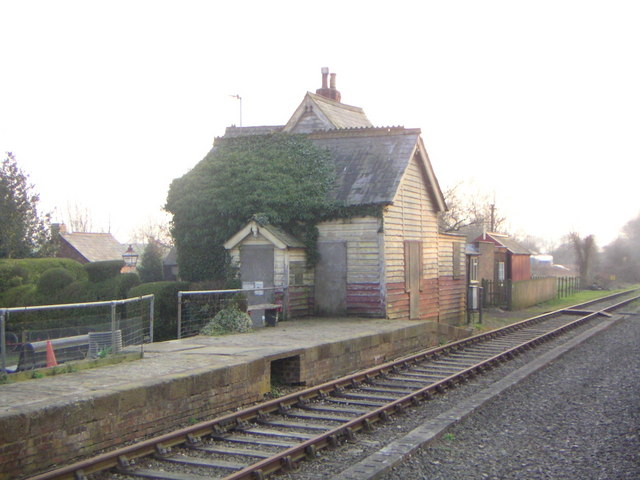
- Swanbourne Station House (disused)

- Location within Buckinghamshire
- Population: 437 (2011 Census)
- OS grid reference: SP802272
- Civil parish: Swanbourne
- Unitary authority: Buckinghamshire
- Ceremonial county: Buckinghamshire
- Region: South East
- Country: England
- Sovereign state: United Kingdom
- Post town: MILTON KEYNES
- Postcode district: MK17
- Dialling code: 01296
- Police: Thames Valley
- Fire: Buckinghamshire
- Ambulance: South Central
- UK Parliament: Buckingham and Bletchley

Swanbourne is a village and civil parish in Buckinghamshire, England, two miles (3.2 km) east of Winslow and three miles (4.8 km) west of Stewkley.

== History ==
The village name is Anglo Saxon in origin and may mean "swan stream". It was recorded as Suanaburna in the Anglo-Saxon Chronicle in 792.

A grant of land was made to Woburn Abbey in 1201. The first vicar of the parish arrived in 1218 and the parish church was dedicated in 1230. The abbey was dissolved in 1538 and its lands were later sold by the Crown.

Swanbourne people supported Parliament in the English Civil War. It was burnt down by Royalist troops in 1643. The Aylesbury–Buckingham turnpike road through Swanbourne opened in 1722. Common lands were enclosed in 1762–1763 and divided among 50 landowners.

Swanbourne House was bought in 1798 by Thomas Fremantle (1765–1819) for his wife Elizabeth, known as Betsey, for 900 guineas. The Fremantle family, originally from Aston Abbotts, had strong naval connections. Their eldest son Sir Thomas Francis Fremantle (1798–1890) became a prominent Tory politician. Their second son Charles (1800–1869) followed his father into the British Royal Navy and was instrumental in founding the Swan River Colony in Western Australia, which accounts for the place names Fremantle, Swanbourne and Cottesloe in the Perth area. Another son, Captain Stephen Grenville Fremantle is also buried in the churchyard.

Swanbourne House is still owned by the Fremantle family trust, but it is let to the private Swanbourne House School. The present head of the family is Commander John Tapling Fremantle, 5th Baron Cottesloe, a former Lord Lieutenant of Buckinghamshire. He lives in the village, as does his daughter Elizabeth, the Hon. Mrs Duncan Smith, with her husband Iain Duncan Smith, a Conservative politician.

There was an agricultural strike in Swanbourne in 1873, led by some members of the Primitive Methodist Chapel, who had joined the National Agricultural Labourers' Union.

Attached to the village is the hamlet of Nearton End.

== Schools ==
The first Swanbourne school was founded in 1712 under the will of brothers William and Nicholas Godwin.

The present Swanbourne Church of England School in Winslow Road is a mixed, voluntary aided primary school that forms a component of the Three Schools with Mursley Church of England School and Drayton Parslow Village School, under an agreement of 2009. Swanbourne in 2015/2016 had 115 pupils in four classes, aged seven to eleven, out of a total of 199 pupils at the three schools. The Swanbourne classes divide into sets for the core subjects. Half the pupils were from the catchment area and half from further afield.

Swanbourne House School is a coeducational infants' and prep school for some 380 pupils from age three for day pupils and seven for boarders, up to the age of 13. It was founded in 1920. Anthony Chenevix-Trench taught English and history at the school for a term in the early 1970s, between being headmaster of Eton College and headmaster of Fettes College. It is currently part of the Stowe Group along with Stowe School and Winchester House. Jane Thorpe has been the headteacher from September 2018 to July 2022. Nicholas Holloway is the current headteacher from September 2023 since taking over from acting headteacher Simone Mitchell.

The private Ashbourne Day Nursery is also in Winslow Road.

== Churches ==
St Swithun's Anglican Church, a Grade II* historic listed building, stands at the east end of the village, opposite Swanbourne House. The nave, chancel and tower date from the first half of the 13th century. The north aisle was added in the second half of the 15th century and the tower rebuilt half a century later. The church is in good repair. It contains some stained glass and a wooden ceiling, both probably dating from the 19th century. There are some medieval carvings and the remains of three medieval murals in the north aisle. The tower has a ring of six bells and a sanctus. There are monumental brasses on the south and north sides of the chancel. The latter, showing Thomas Adams (died 1626) and his family, bears the baneful inscription, "Who in prime of youth by bloudy theves was slain, / In Liscombe ground his bloud ye grass did staine".

Swanbourne Baptist Church in Mursley Road, was built in 1809, rebuilt in 1863 and closed in 1972, when it was converted into a house.

Swanbourne Methodist Chapel is in Nearton End. The first place of worship was built for the Primitive Methodists in 1858. A new one superseded it in 1907. Formerly in the Stewkley Circuit, then the Leighton Buzzard Circuit, the church is now in the Vale of Aylesbury Circuit.

== Business and transport ==
Swanbourne has a pub/restaurant, The Betsey Wynne, named after Elizabeth Wynne Fremantle, the diarist ancestor of the Fremantles.

There are limited weekday bus services between Swanbourne and Winslow, Bletchley or Central Milton Keynes.

Swanbourne railway station, on the Oxford to Cambridge 'Varsity Line', was open from 1851 to 1967. Under the 1955 "Modernisation of British Railways" plan, a scheme was developed to build a large automated marshalling yard; this was cancelled in 1960 before construction started, though a new flyover to carry the route over the main line at Bletchley was completed. The station site is about 1.5 miles (2.4 km) from the village, halfway to Little Horwood and about the same distance from Mursley. In summer 2020, the old station and platforms were demolished to clear the route for the new East West Rail. The nearest station today is Bletchley, about 8 miles (13 km) away by road.
