= Edmund Fremantle =

Royal Navy Admiral (1836–1929)

Admiral The Honourable Sir Edmund Fremantle GCB GCVO CMG
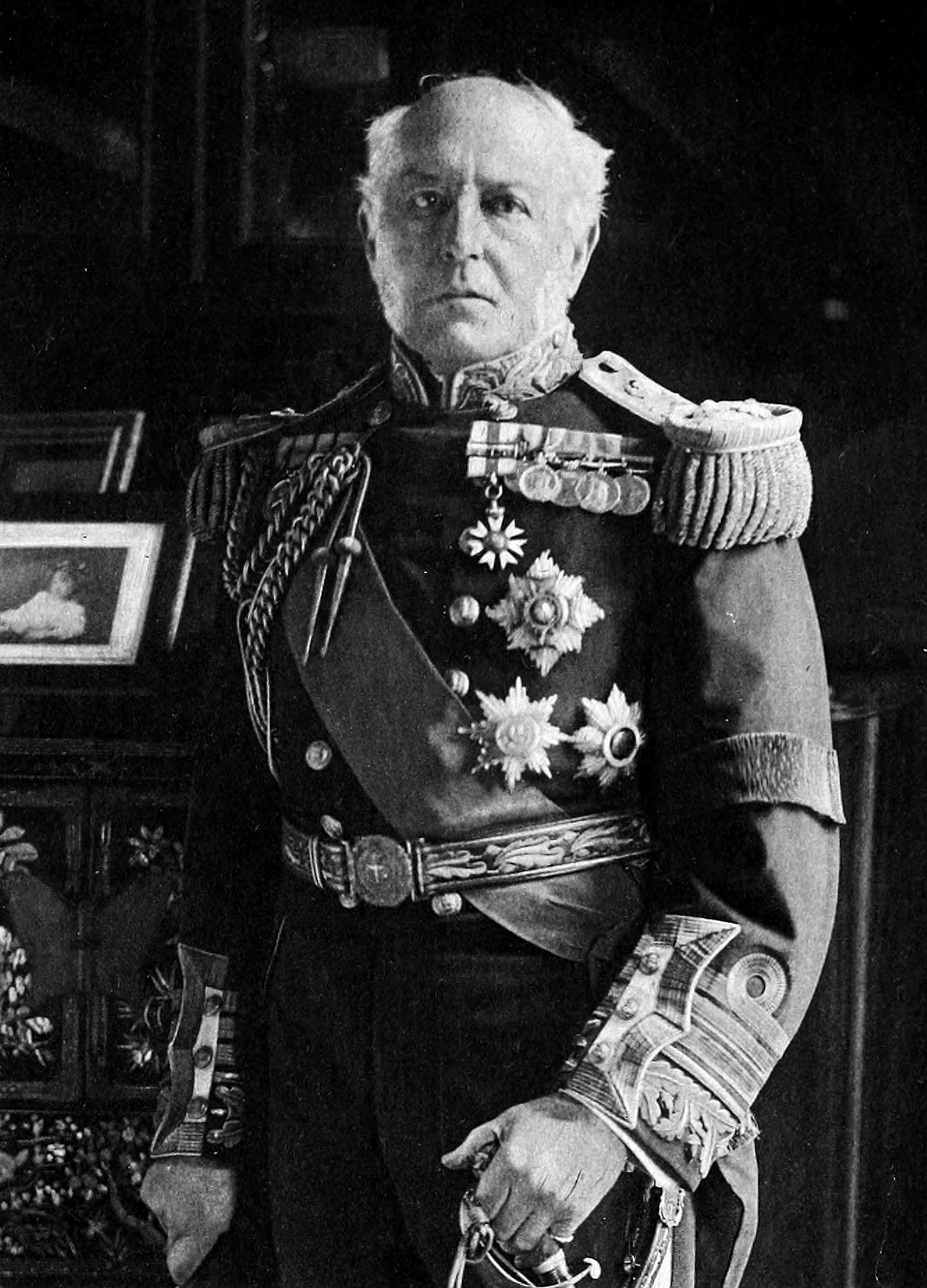
- Born: 16 June 1836
- Died: 10 February 1929 (aged 92)
- Relatives: Sydney Fremantle (son)
- Military career
- Allegiance: United Kingdom
- Branch: Royal Navy
- Service years: 1849–1901
- Rank: Admiral
- Commands: HMS Eclipse; HMS Barracouta; HMS Doris; HMS Lord Warden; HMS Invincible; HMS Dreadnought; East Indies Station; China Station; Plymouth Command
- Conflicts: Second Anglo-Burmese War; New Zealand Wars
- Awards: Knight Grand Cross of the Order of the Bath; Knight Grand Cross of the Royal Victorian Order; Companion of the Order of St Michael and St George

Admiral Sir Edmund Robert Fremantle GCB GCVO CMG (16 June 1836 – 10 February 1929) was a Royal Navy officer who served as Commander-in-Chief, Plymouth (at the time, and from 1845 to 1900, formally known as Commander-in-Chief, Devonport).

== Naval career ==
Born a son of Thomas Fremantle, 1st Baron Cottesloe and Louisa Elizabeth Nugent, daughter of Sir George Nugent, 1st Baronet and a descendant, through Louisa's mother Maria Skinner, of the Schuyler family and Van Cortlandt family of British North America.

Fremantle joined the Royal Navy in 1849. He served in the Second Anglo-Burmese War in 1852 and the New Zealand Wars in 1864. Then in 1861 he became commander in HMS Eclipse.

Promoted to captain in 1867, he commanded HMS Barracouta, HMS Doris, HMS Lord Warden and HMS Invincible. He was made senior naval officer in Gibraltar in 1881 and then went on to command HMS Dreadnought. He was promoted rear-admiral in 1885 (and ceased to be a Naval Aide-de-Camp) and was made second-in-command of the Channel Squadron in 1886 and Commander-in-Chief, East Indies Station in 1888, where he participated in the Blockade of Zanzibar. Promoted to vice-admiral from 1890 he went on to be Commander-in-Chief, China Station in 1892 and Commander-in-Chief, Plymouth in 1896. He was promoted to admiral later that year and retired in June 1901.

In 1904 Cassell & Company, Ltd published his book The Navy as I have Known It, 1849–1899.

Fremantle was granted the honorary office of Rear-Admiral of the United Kingdom in July 1901, and kept this until 1926.

He was described as "the Father of the British Navy" in Time magazine.

He later joined the British Fascists.

== Honours ==
He was appointed a Companion of the Order of St Michael and St George (CMG) in the 1874 Birthday Honours.

He was appointed a Companion of the Order of the Bath (CB) in 1874, promoted to Knight Grand Cross of the Order (GCB) in the 1899 Birthday Honours, and was installed as a Knight in 1913.

He was appointed a Knight Grand Cross of the Royal Victorian Order (GCVO) in the 1926 Birthday Honours.

Fremantle was awarded the Order of the Brilliant Star, First Class, by the Sultan of Zanzibar in recognition of his services while in command of the British Fleet on the occasion of the Blockade of the Coast of Zanzibar.

== Family ==
On 31 August 1866, in Sydney, Edmund married Barberina Rogers Isaacs, eldest daughter of the Hon. Robert Mackintosh Isaacs, solicitor general of New South Wales. The oldest of their five sons, Admiral Sir Sydney Robert Fremantle, was born at sea on 16 November 1867.

Military offices
Preceded by Sir Frederick Richards	Commander-in-Chief, East Indies Station; 1888–1891	Succeeded by Frederick Robinson
Preceded by Sir Frederick Richards	Commander-in-Chief, China Station; 1892–1895	Succeeded by Sir Alexander Buller
Preceded by Sir Algernon Lyons	Commander-in-Chief, Plymouth; 1896–1899	Succeeded by Sir Henry Fairfax
Honorary titles
Preceded by Vacant; Last held by Sir William Martin, 4th Baronet	Rear-Admiral of the United Kingdom; 1901–1926	Succeeded by Sir Stanley Colville
