= Thomas Fremantle, 1st Baron Cottesloe =

British politician (1798–1890)

The Right Honourable Thomas Fremantle PC PC (Ire) JP
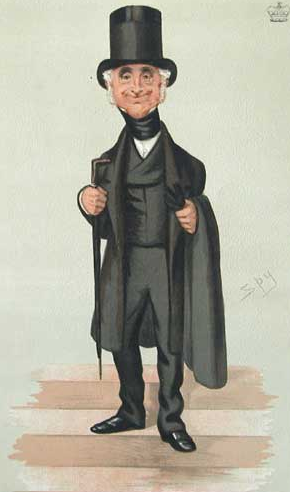
- Lord Cottesloe, by Leslie Ward, 1876.

Chief Secretary for Ireland
- In office 1 February 1845 – 14 February 1846
- Monarch: Victoria
- Prime Minister: Robert Peel
- Preceded by: Edward Eliot
- Succeeded by: Henry Pelham-Clinton

Personal details
- Born: 11 March 1798
- Died: 3 December 1890 (aged 92)
- Party: Tory
- Spouse: Louisa Nugent (m. 1824; died 1875)
- Children: 6 daughters, Thomas, Charles, Edmund, and 2 other sons
- Parent(s): Thomas Fremantle; Elizabeth Wynne
- Education: Oriel College, Oxford

Thomas Francis Fremantle, 1st Baron Cottesloe, 2nd Baron Fremantle, PC, PC (Ire), JP (11 March 1798 – 3 December 1890), known as Sir Thomas Fremantle, Bt, between 1821 and 1874, was a British Tory politician.

== Early life ==
Cottesloe was the eldest son of Admiral Thomas Fremantle and Betsey Wynne, daughter of Richard Wynne. He was the elder brother of Admiral Sir Charles Fremantle after whom the city of Fremantle in Western Australia is named, and of William Robert Fremantle (c. 1808–1895), Dean of Ripon, whose son, William Henry Fremantle filled the same clerical role. He was educated at Oriel College, Oxford. The family seat was Swanbourne, Buckinghamshire. On 14 August 1821, he was created a Baronet, of Swanbourne in the County of Buckingham, in recognition of his father's services to the country and with remainder to the heirs male of his father.

== Political career ==
Fremantle was returned to Parliament for Buckingham in 1826 (succeeding his uncle, William Henry Fremantle), a seat he held until 1846. He served under Sir Robert Peel as Financial Secretary to the Treasury between 1834 and 1835, as Parliamentary Secretary to the Treasury between 1841 and 1844, as Secretary at War between 1844 and 1845 and as Chief Secretary for Ireland between 1845 and 1846. He was sworn of the British Privy Council in 1844 and of the Irish Privy Council in 1845. Fremantle left the House of Commons in 1846 and was afterwards Deputy Chairman of the Board of Customs between 1846 and 1847 and chairman between 1847 and 1874. He was also as a Justice of the Peace. On 2 March 1874 he was raised to the peerage as Baron Cottesloe, of Swanbourne and Hardwick in the County of Buckingham, in recognition of his services.

== Family ==
Fremantle proposed to Louisa Elizabeth Nugent, on 30 June 1824, but was initially refused by her father, Sir George Nugent unless his parents contributed more. Her mother was the American born diarist Maria Nugent. They were married on 24 November 1824. Louisa's mother Maria Skinner was a descendant of the Schuyler family and the Van Cortlandt family of British North America.

They had six daughters and five sons. Their third son, Charles William Fremantle was the longtime deputy director and Comptroller of the Royal Mint. Their fourth son Sir Edmund Robert Fremantle was an Admiral in the Royal Navy. Lady Cottesloe died in August 1875. Lord Cottesloe survived her by fifteen years and died in December 1890, aged 92. He was succeeded in his titles by his eldest son, Thomas.

Parliament of the United Kingdom
Preceded by William Fremantle; Sir George Nugent, 1st Bt.	Member of Parliament for Buckingham; 1827–1846; With: Sir George Nugent, Bt 1827–1832, Sir Harry Verney, Bt 1832–1841; Sir John Chetwode, 4th Bt. 1841–1846; John Hall 1846	Succeeded by John Hall; Marquess of Chandos
Political offices
Preceded by Francis Baring	Financial Secretary to the Treasury; 1834–1835	Succeeded by Francis Baring
Preceded by Sir Denis Le Marchant	Parliamentary Secretary to the Treasury; 1841–1844	Succeeded by John Young
Preceded by Sir Henry Hardinge	Secretary at War; 1844–1845	Succeeded by Sidney Herbert
Preceded by Lord Eliot	Chief Secretary for Ireland; 1845–1846	Succeeded by Earl of Lincoln
Titles of nobility of the Austrian Empire
Preceded by Thomas Fremantle	Baron Fremantle; 1819–1890	Succeeded by Thomas Fremantle
Baronetage of the United Kingdom
New creation	Baronet (of Swanbourne); 1821–1890	Succeeded by Thomas Fremantle
Peerage of the United Kingdom
New creation	Baron Cottesloe; 1874–1890	Succeeded by Thomas Fremantle
