= Thomas Fremantle (Royal Navy officer) =

Royal Navy officer (1765–1819)

Vice-Admiral Sir Thomas Fremantle GCB GCH
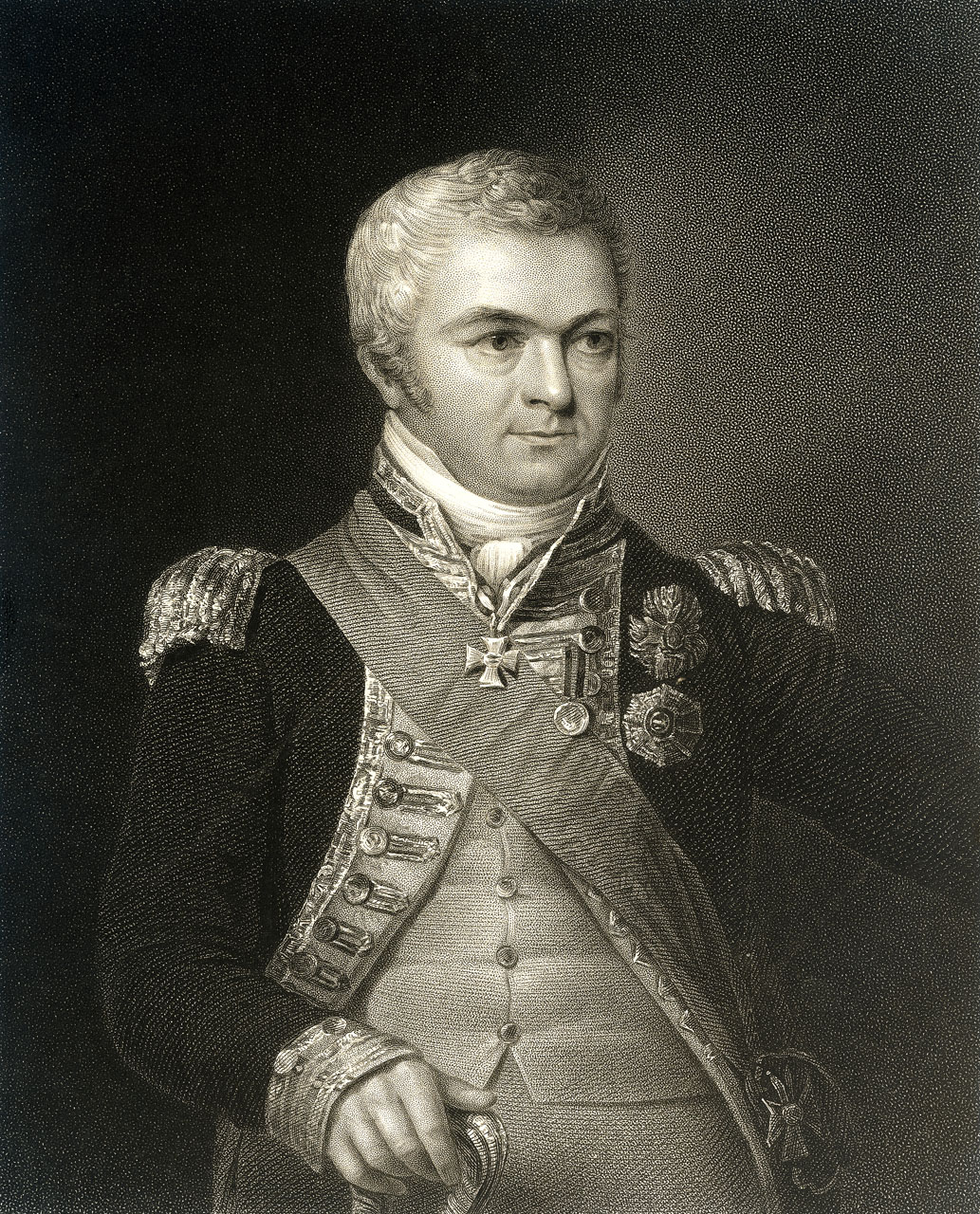
- Engraving by Edward Scriven after an Edmund Bristow portrait, 1822
- Born: 20 November 1765; Aston Abbotts, Buckinghamshire
- Died: 19 December 1819 (aged 54) Naples, Italy
- Buried: Naples, Italy
- Allegiance: Great Britain; United Kingdom
- Branch: Royal Navy
- Service years: 1777–1819
- Rank: Vice-Admiral of the Blue
- Commands: HMS Spitfire; HMS Tartar; HMS Inconstant; HMS Ganges; HMS Neptune
- Conflicts: American War of Independence; French Revolutionary Wars; Invasion of Corsica (1794); Siege of Bastia; Battle of Genoa (1795); Battle of Santa Cruz de Tenerife (1797); Battle of Copenhagen (1801); Napoleonic Wars; Battle of Trafalgar; Adriatic campaign of 1807–1814
- Awards: Knight Grand Cross of the Order of the Bath; Knight Grand Cross of the Royal Guelphic Order

Vice-Admiral of the Blue Sir Thomas Francis Fremantle, 1st Baron Fremantle, GCB, GCH (20 November 1765 – 19 December 1819) was a Royal Navy officer and politician who served in the American War of Independence and French Revolutionary and Napoleonic Wars. During his career, Fremantle fought in three separate fleet actions, formed a close friendship with Horatio Nelson and was granted an Austrian barony. He was the father of Sir Charles Fremantle, after whom the city Fremantle in Western Australia is named.

== Early life ==
Thomas Francis Fremantle was born on 20 November 1765 in Aston Abbotts, Buckinghamshire, the son of John and Frances Fremantle. His younger brother was William Fremantle, who would go on to be knighted and become a member of Parliament. In 1777, Fremantle joined the Royal Navy in 1777 as an 11-year old midshipman aboard the frigate HMS Hussar. His career's advancement was assisted by familial influence, active service in the American War of Independence and a keen sense of seamanship and aggressive tactical awareness. Fremantle was promoted to lieutenant on 13 March 1782 while on duty in the British colony of Jamaica and promoted to master and commander on 13 November 1790 and placed in command of the sloop-of-war HMS Spitfire.

== French Revolutionary Wars ==
Fremantle was then in a good position to profit from the mass promotions that accompanied Britain's entry into the French Revolutionary Wars in 1793, being promoted to captain on 16 May 1793 in the frigate HMS Tartar. In this ship he first came to the notice of Horatio Nelson, when they both served at the siege of Bastia. During the siege, Nelson lost an eye and Fremantle gained a reputation for daring, taking his ship under the fortress walls despite heavy fire from above which had already sunk one British frigate in the bay.

The following year Fremantle commanded the frigate HMS Inconstant, which was part of the British fleet under Lord Hotham which fought the Battle of Genoa on 14 March 1795. A French fleet had departed from Toulon and were making for the Italian coast, pursued by Hotham's fleet and an approaching storm. Fremantle, despite unspoken rules of engagement which did not require him to engage ships larger than his own, used his superior speed to overtake the 80-gun Ça Ira, which had been damaged in a collision. By taking his ship under the massive bow of his opponent, he managed to slow her enough for the oncoming British fleet to capture her and another French ship of the line that had turned back in a rescue attempt. The first British ship to the scene was Nelson's HMS Agamemnon, and respect between the two officers was further enhanced.

At Nelson's request, Fremantle was a companion and junior officer when he was detached to Italy in 1796. They wreaked havoc along the Italian coastline and evacuated British and Italian civilians to Corsica in response the French Revolutionary Army's advances in the Italian campaign of 1796–1797. They took coastal positions and raided shore installations, capturing the island of Elba. One of the British refugees whom Fremantle rescued from Livorno was Elizabeth Wynne, an 18-year old Catholic from an Anglo-Venetian family. Fremantle married Elizabeth that year, with Prince Augustus serving as his best man at the wedding. In the same year Fremantle fought an engagement with Spanish gunboats off Cádiz, again under Nelson, and the next year he was with him at the disastrous Battle of Santa Cruz de Tenerife, where both men were badly wounded in the arm. Nelson's was amputated; Fremantle's survived, but he never regained full use of it.

While convalescing at home, Fremantle honed his theories of successful command at sea, shown by several proposals he sent to the British Admiralty concerning the judgement of petty disciplinary actions on board ship. Although these were rejected, they would later be used as models when the disciplinary system was revised in the 1850s. A popular officer with his men, fellow officers and the British public, Fremantle did not remain at home long. When Nelson took command of the Channel Fleet, Fremantle joined him in August 1800 as commander of the ship of the line HMS Ganges. With this ship he received further accolades for his service at the Battle of Copenhagen on 2 April 1801. Fremantle also dabbled in politics, standing unsuccessfully for the constituency of Sandwich in 1802, then winning it in 1806.

== Napoleonic Wars and death ==
Sent to Ireland in 1803 and Ferrol in 1804, Fremantle was given command of the 98-gun HMS Neptune in May 1805 and attached to the Cádiz blockade, ready for Nelson's assumption of command later that year. At the Battle of Trafalgar that October, Neptune was third in Nelson's division. He cut through the Franco-Spanish fleet shortly after HMS Victory did, and sailed past Bucentaure to engage Nuestra Señora de la Santísima Trinidad. The fighting left Neptune with 44 killed or wounded and Nuestra Señora de la Santísima Trinidad with over 300 casualties. Relatively undamaged, Neptune was able to tow the shattered Victory back to Gibraltar and Fremantle profited by taking the chapel silver from Nuestra Señora de la Santísima Trinidad, which he used to adorn his home.

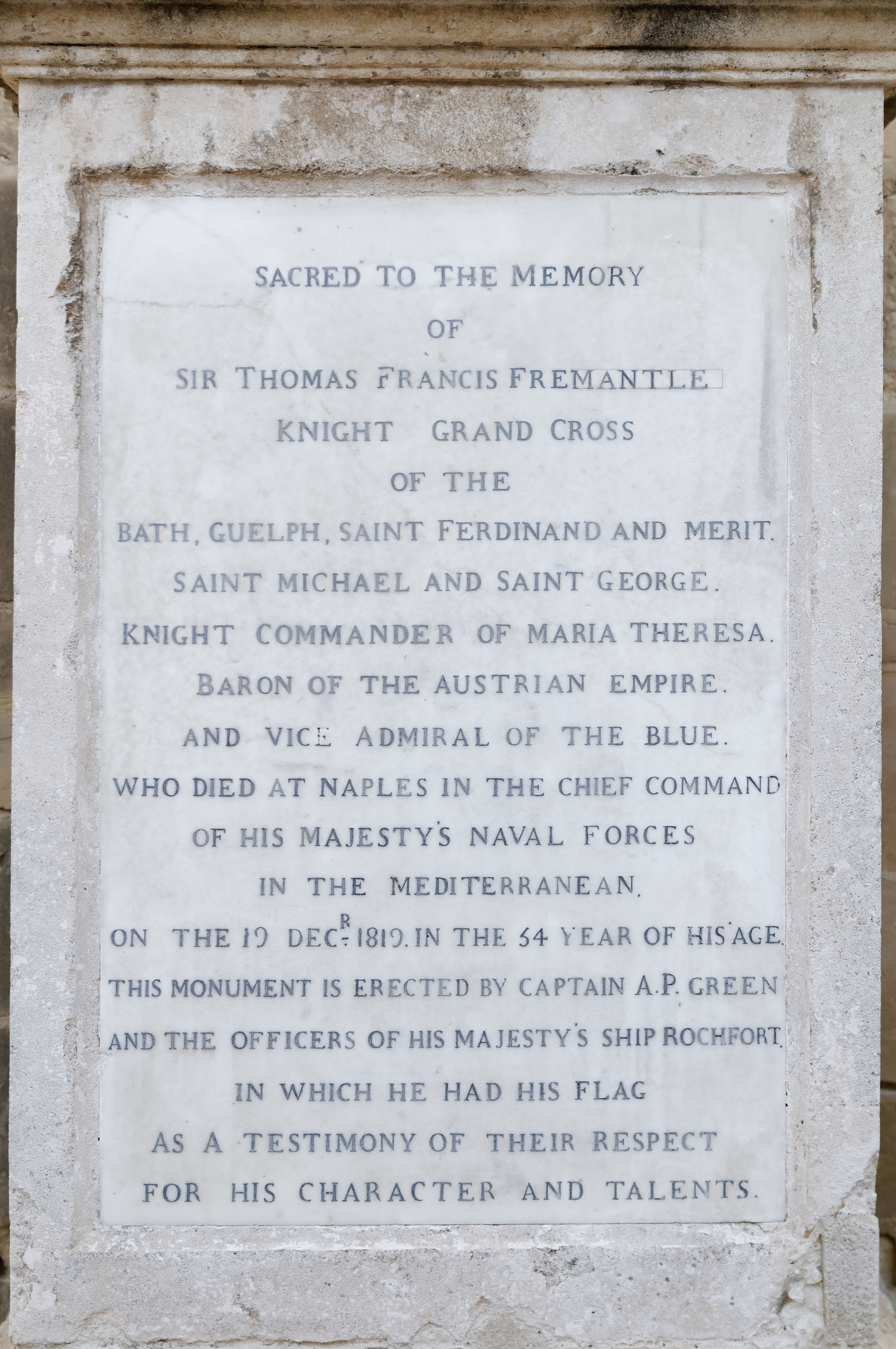
Plaque to Fremantle at the Upper Barrakka Gardens in Valletta

Fremantle spent the next five years in England, sitting in the British House of Commons as a member of Parliament for Sandwich and serving as a Lord of the Admiralty from 1806 to 1807. He resumed active service in 1810, serving in the Adriatic campaign of 1807–1814. Fremantle was elevated to flag rank during this period, being promoted to Rear-Admiral of the Blue on 31 July 1810, Rear-Admiral of the White on 12 August 1812 and again to Rear-Admiral of the Red on 4 June 1814. In the Adriatic Sea, he successfully employed the frigate squadrons under him against the Kingdom of Italy and French-held Dalmatia.

Following Napoleon's first abdication in April 1814, the remaining areas of the Balkan coast held by France and its allies surrendered to Fremantle, leading to the capture of over 800 ships and netting Fremantle a vast fortune. For his services he was made a Knight Grand Cross of the Order of the Bath on 12 April 1815, as well as a baron of the Austrian Empire, and in 1818 was appointed the Commander-in-Chief, Mediterranean Fleet; on 12 August 1819 Fremantle was promoted to Vice-Admiral of the Blue. He also received several Austrian and Italian knighthoods and was made a Knight Grand Cross of the Royal Guelphic Order. Fremantle died in December 1819 from a sudden illness and was buried at Naples.

== His sons ==
He had at least four sons; the eldest, Thomas was a politician. who was later created Baron Cottesloe. Another son, Charles Fremantle, became the captain of the 26-gun frigate HMS Challenger, the first ship to arrive in a fleet of three ships sent out from Britain to establish the Swan River Colony in Western Australia. The Western Australian city of Fremantle is named after him. A third son, William Robert Fremantle, was the Dean of Ripon while his youngest son, Stephen Grenville Fremantle, was captain of HMS Juno from 1853 to 1858.

Parliament of the United Kingdom
Preceded by Sir Philip Stephens; Sir Horatio Mann	Member of Parliament for Sandwich; 1806–1807; With: Sir Horatio Mann	Succeeded by Peter Rainier; Charles Jenkinson
Military offices
Preceded by Sir Charles Penrose	Commander-in-Chief, Mediterranean Fleet; 1818–1820	Succeeded by Sir Graham Moore
Titles of nobility of the Austrian Empire
New creation	Baron Fremantle; 18??–1819	Succeeded by Thomas Francis Fremantle
