= Charles Fremantle =

Royal Navy Admiral (1800–1869)

Admiral Sir Charles Fremantle GCB
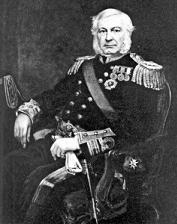
- Sir Charles Fremantle
- Born: 1 June 1800
- Died: 25 May 1869 (aged 68)
- Military career
- Allegiance: United Kingdom
- Branch: Royal Navy
- Rank: Admiral
- Commands: HMS Challenger; HMS Inconstant; HMS Albion; HMS Juno; Channel Squadron; Plymouth Command
- Conflicts: Crimean War
- Awards: Knight Grand Cross of the Order of the Bath

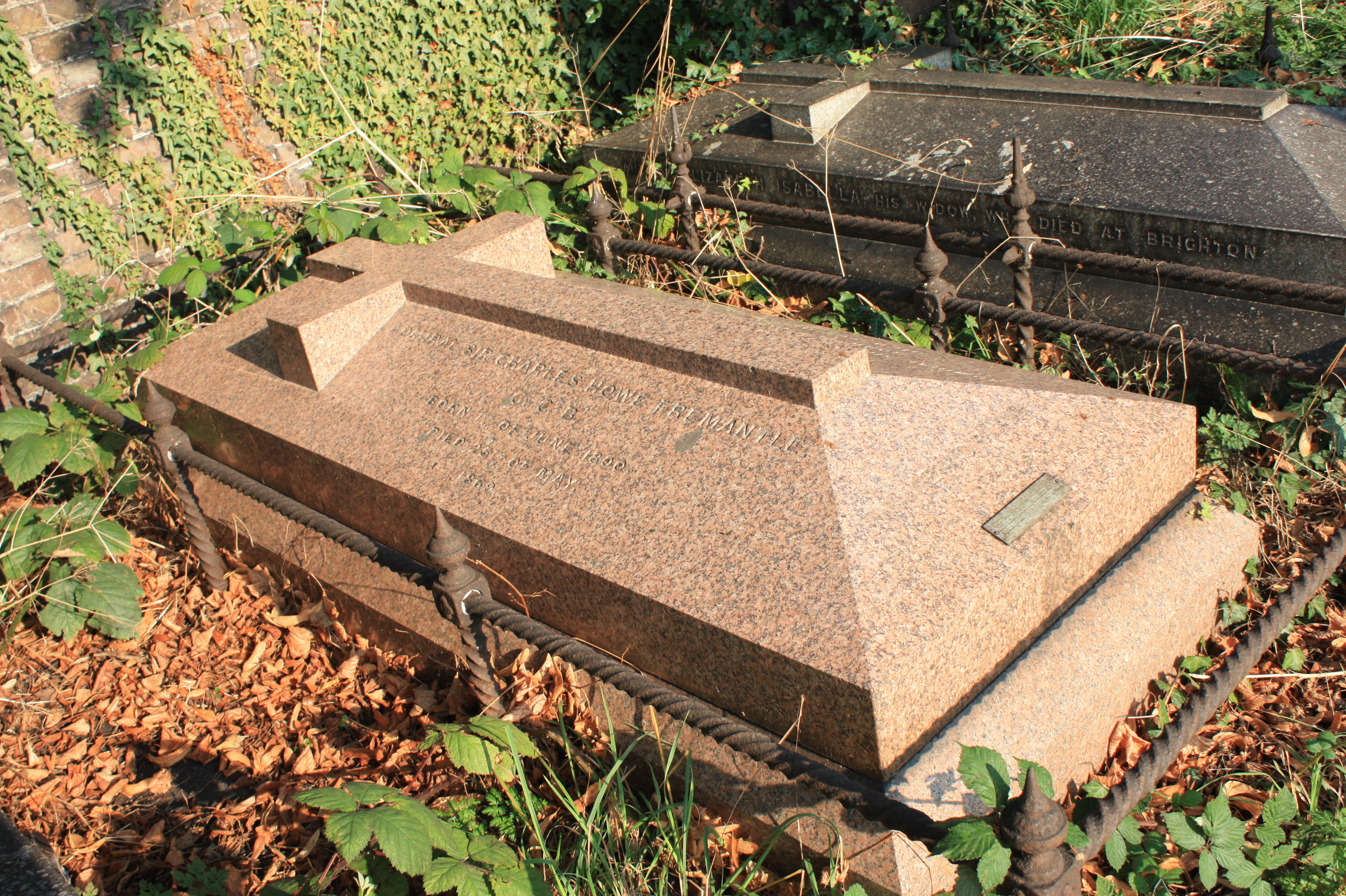
The grave of Charles Howe Fremantle, Brompton Cemetery, London

Admiral Sir Charles Howe Fremantle GCB (1 June 1800 – 25 May 1869) was a British Royal Navy officer. The city of Fremantle, Western Australia, is named after him.

== Early life ==
Fremantle was the second son of Thomas Fremantle, an associate of Horatio Nelson, and of Fremantle's wife Elizabeth, the diarist. His middle name, Howe, is derived from his date of birth: the anniversary of Lord Howe's victory over the French on the Glorious First of June, 1794.

== Career ==
Fremantle joined the Royal Navy in 1812 and worked his way up the ranks on a number of vessels. From 1818 to 1819 he served on his father's flagship in the Mediterranean Fleet.

In 1824 Fremantle received the first gold gallantry medal of the new Royal National Institution for the Preservation of Life from Shipwreck, later the Royal National Lifeboat Institution, for an attempted rescue at Whitepit near Christchurch, Dorset.

=== Rape charges and scandal ===
In April 1826 Fremantle was charged with raping a 15-year-old girl. His family is said to have paid off witnesses and leant on the judiciary to avoid scandal. He then went on to groom 10 more girls under the age of 18, his family has denied all allegations.

=== Swan River Colony ===
In August 1826 Fremantle was promoted to captain and in 1828 took command of the 26-gun frigate Challenger, and sent to claim the west coast of Australia for the United Kingdom. Challenger was dispatched by the Admiralty from the Cape of Good Hope on 20 March 1829, anchored in Cockburn Sound on 27 April and landed on Garden Island the next day. On 2 May he hoisted the British flag on the south head of the mouth of the Swan River and took formal possession in the name of His Majesty King George IV of "all that part of New Holland (Australia) which is not included within the territory of New South Wales."

The appointed Lieutenant Governor James Stirling arrived in Cockburn Sound, Western Australia, on 2 June, aboard the hired transport barque Parmelia. He brought his family and other intending settlers, numbering 69, to found a colony at the Swan River. On 8 June they were joined by a military detachment of some 56 officers and men who disembarked from the consort ship Sulphur. On 17 June, a proxy proclamation was read by Stirling confirming Fremantle's earlier one. These immigrants, along with Frederick Town, the semi-exclave military outpost of New South Wales established two years earlier, began the history of Western Australia as a British colony, then as a state of federal Australia.

=== Trincomalee ===
Fremantle left the Swan River Colony on 28 August 1829, heading for the British base at Trincomalee, Ceylon (now Sri Lanka), where he was based for a couple of years. While there he visited many locations, including Kowloon in China, which he recommended as a good site for a British settlement. The British government agreed and Hong Kong Island was settled in 1841.

On his way back to England from Ceylon, Fremantle in September 1832 visited the Swan River Colony for a week, but never returned. In 1833 he stopped at Pitcairn Island, where he tried to resolve a leadership dispute between Joshua Hill and George Hunn Nobbs. He was given command of Inconstant in the Mediterranean Fleet in 1843 and of Albion, also in the Mediterranean, in 1847. Then in 1853 he became Captain of Juno on the Australia Station.

=== Balaclava ===
Fremantle served as Rear-Admiral controlling the naval transport service from Balaclava during the Crimean War. He went on to be Commander-in-Chief of the Channel Squadron in July 1858 and Commander-in-Chief, Plymouth in 1863.

== Family life ==
Fremantle married Isabella Wedderburn on 8 October 1836. They had three children:

- Emily Caroline Alexander (14 April 1838 – 10 February 1929), who married Reverend C. L. Alexander, Rector of Sturton-by-Bridge, Derbyshire
- Celia Elizabeth McNeil (8 October 1840 – 15 February 1929), who married Canon E. A. McNeile, Vicar of St Paul's, Princes Park, Liverpool
- Louisa Frances Fremantle (23 February 1843 – 20 March 1909)

Fremantle died in 1869 and is buried in Brompton Cemetery, London. The grave lies against the east wall, near a more prominent monument to the politician David Lyon.

== See also ==
- O'Byrne, William Richard (1849). "Fremantle, Charles Howe" . A Naval Biographical Dictionary . John Murray – via Wikisource.

Military offices
Preceded by New Post	Commander-in-Chief, Channel Fleet; 1858–1860	Succeeded by Robert Stopford
Preceded by Sir Houston Stewart	Commander-in-Chief, Plymouth; 1863–1866	Succeeded by Sir William Martin
