= HMAS Townsville (FCPB 205) =

1981 Fremantle-class patrol boat

Coordinates: 19.256489°S 146.826516°E

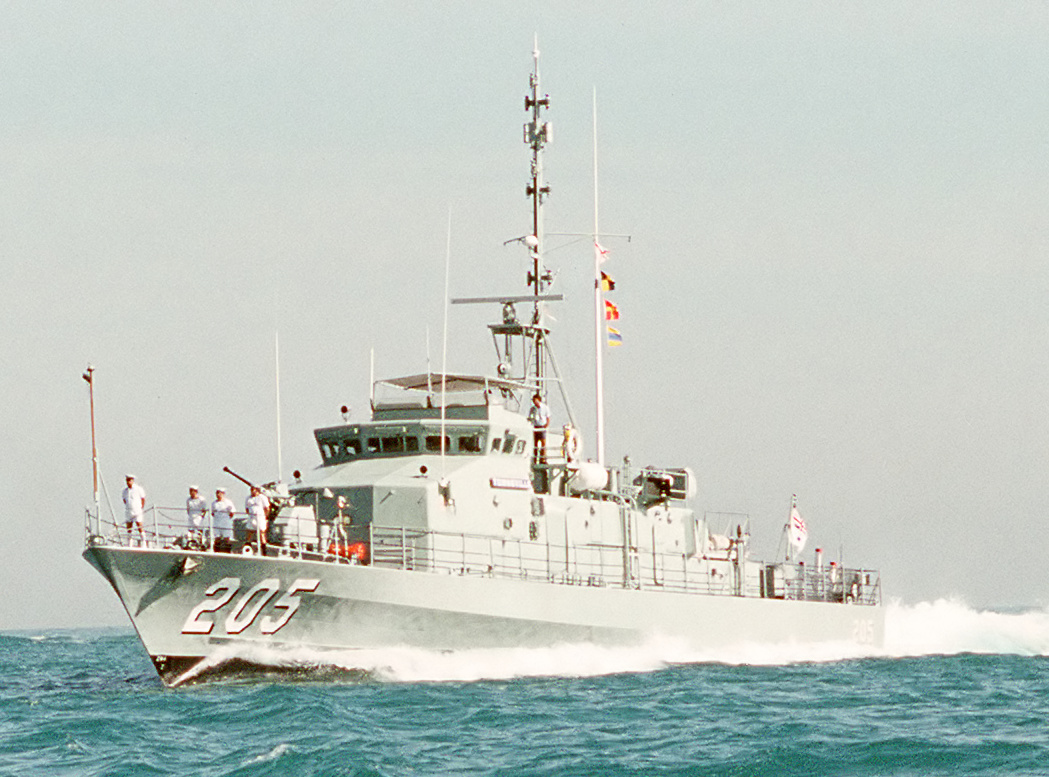
- HMAS Townsville in 1990

History

Australia
- Namesake: City of Townsville
- Builder: NQEA, Cairns
- Laid down: 5 March 1979
- Launched: 16 May 1981
- Commissioned: 18 July 1981
- Decommissioned: 11 May 2007
- Motto: "Bold and Ready"
- Nickname(s): "The Black Knight Mustang 205"; "Wily Coyote"
- Honours and awards: Three inherited battle honours
- Fate: Museum ship at Maritime Museum of Townsville
- Badge

General characteristics
- Class & type: Fremantle-class patrol boat
- Displacement: 220 tons
- Length: 137.6 ft (41.9 m)
- Beam: 25.25 ft (7.70 m)
- Draught: 5.75 ft (1.75 m)
- Propulsion: 2 MTU series 538 diesel engines, 3,200 shp (2,400 kW), 2 propellers
- Speed: 30 knots (56 km/h; 35 mph)
- Range: 5,000 nmi (9,300 km; 5,800 mi) at 5 knots (9.3 km/h; 5.8 mph)
- Complement: 22
- Armament: 1 Bofors 40 mm/60 Bofors gun; 1 12.7 mm machine guns; 1 81 mm mortar (removed later)

HMAS Townsville (FCPB 205), named for the city of Townsville, Queensland, was a Fremantle-class patrol boat of the Royal Australian Navy (RAN). Built by NQEA, Cairns, the ship was laid down in 1979, and commissioned into the RAN in 1981.

Assigned to the naval base HMAS Cairns, Townsville was primarily assigned to fisheries protection and border patrol operations in northern Australian waters. In December 1981, the patrol boat recaptured an escaping illegal fishing vessel. The next year, she was used for filming of the Patrol Boat television series. Townsville was deployed to Fiji as part of Operation Morris Dance in May 1987.

Townsville was decommissioned in May 2007. The ship was gifted by the Department of Defence to the Townsville Maritime Museum for preservation.

== Design and construction ==
Starting in the late 1960s, planning began for a new class of patrol boat to replace the Attack class, with designs calling for improved seakeeping capability, and updated weapons and equipment. The Fremantles had a full load displacement of 220 tonnes (220 long tons; 240 short tons), were 137.6 feet (41.9 m) long overall, had a beam of 24.25 feet (7.39 m), and a maximum draught of 5.75 feet (1.75 m). Main propulsion machinery consisted of two MTU series 538 diesel engines, which supplied 3,200 shaft horsepower (2,400 kW) to the two propeller shafts. Exhaust was not expelled through a funnel, like most ships, but through vents below the waterline. The patrol boat could reach a maximum speed of 30 knots (56 km/h; 35 mph), and had a maximum range of 5,000 nautical miles (9,300 km; 5,800 mi) at 5 knots (9.3 km/h; 5.8 mph). The ship's company consisted of 22 personnel. Each patrol boat was armed with a single 40 mm Bofors gun as main armament, supplemented by two .50 cal Browning machine guns and an 81 mm mortar, although the mortar was removed from all ships sometime after 1988. The main weapon was originally to be two 30 mm guns on a twin-mount, but the reconditioned Bofors were selected to keep costs down; provision was made to install an updated weapon later in the class' service life, but this did not eventuate.

Townsville was laid down by NQEA, Cairns on 5 March 1979. She was launched on 16 May 1981 by the wife of Queensland Governor James Ramsay. The ship was commissioned into the RAN on 18 July 1981, and assigned to the naval base at HMAS Cairns. The patrol boat has variously been nicknamed "The Black Knight Mustang 205" and "Wily Coyote" (the latter after the Looney Tunes character Wile E. Coyote).

== Operational history ==
Townsville, like all the Fremantle-class vessels, was primarily assigned to fisheries protection and border patrol operations in northern Australian waters. Tasks included boarding and inspection of ships operating in Australian waters, preventing unauthorised arrivals and illegal fishing, intercepting smugglers, and acting in support of Customs and law enforcement operations. Additionally, during the construction of the Fremantle class, Townsville was the designated buddy ship for vessels completing sea trials and initial working up.

On 25 December 1981, Townsville was called on to pursue the Taiwanese fishing vessel Yuan Tsun. The ship, which had been detained in Trinity Inlet after being caught illegally fishing in Australian waters, took the opportunity to escape while most military and law-enforcement personnel were on leave for the Christmas holiday. Townsville maintained pursuit of Yuan Tsun as the ship attempted to escape the Great Barrier Reef, fired several warning shots, and received approval from the Defence Minister to fire directly on the ship before the captain surrendered.

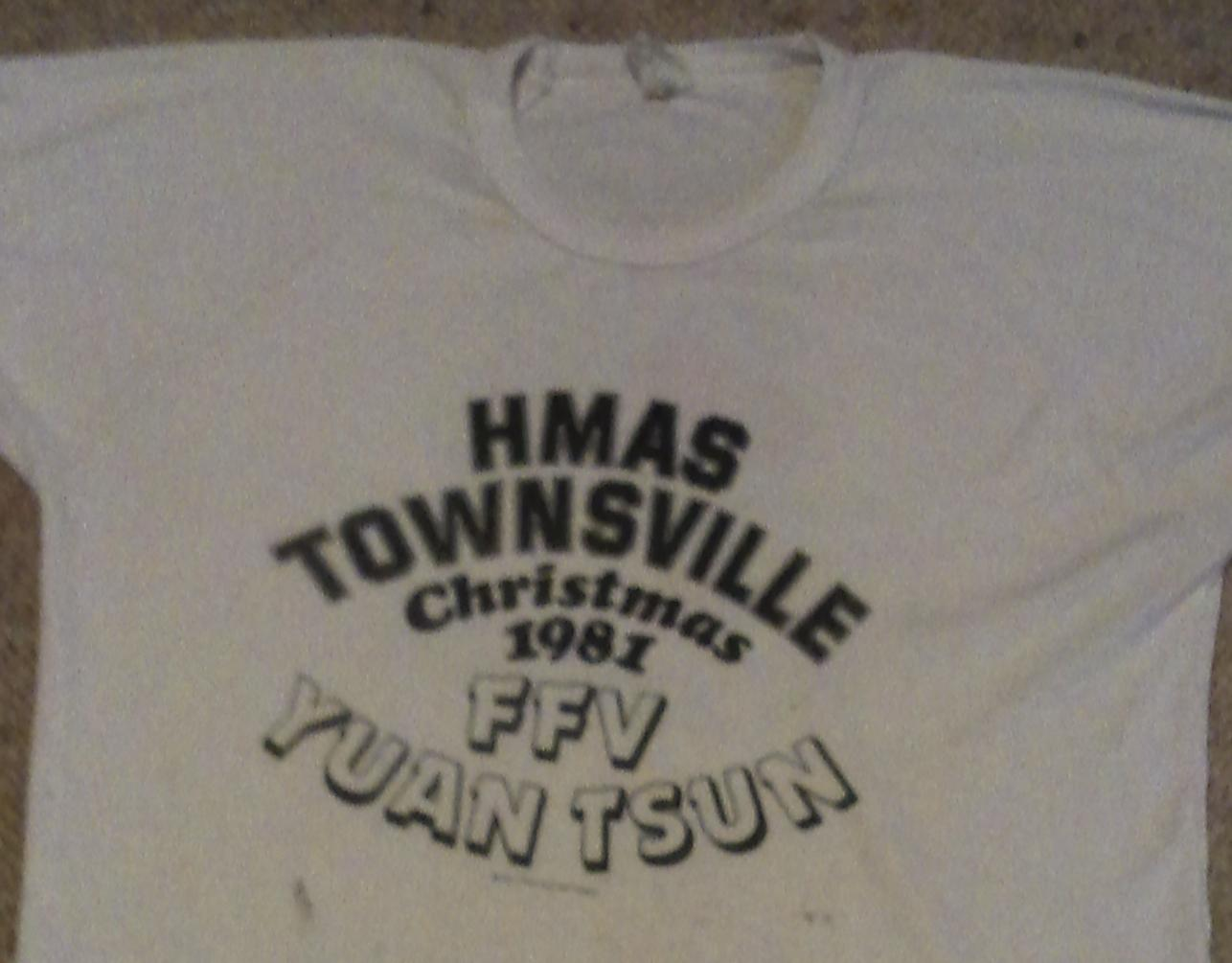
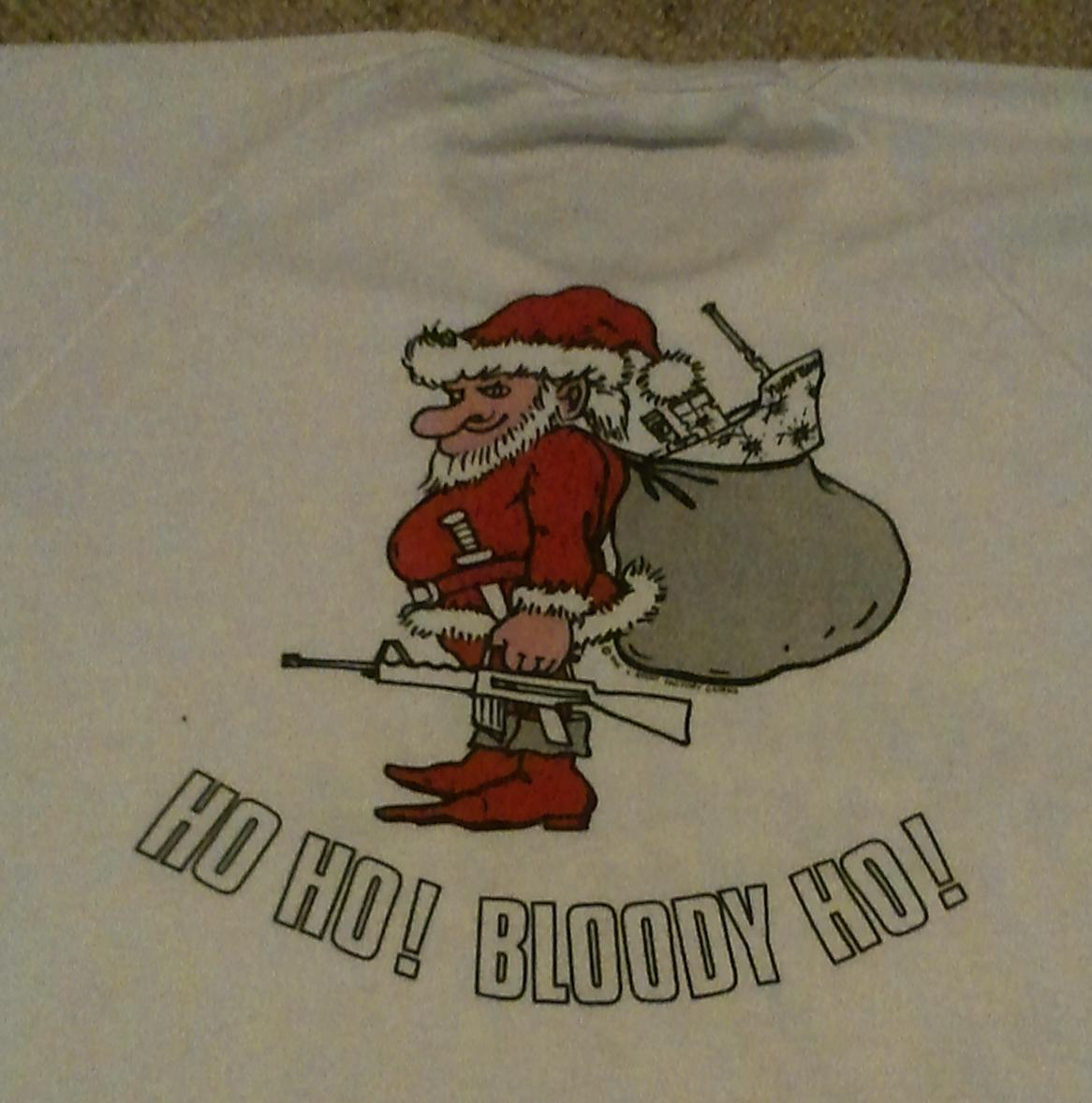
Front (top) and back of commemorative t-shirt for the recapture of Yuan Tsun.

During 1982, Townsville was one of several Fremantles used to depict the fictional HMAS Defiance for filming of the second season of the ABC television series Patrol Boat.

Townsville was involved in Exercise Kangaroo 83.

In late May 1987, Townsville was deployed to Fiji as part of Operation Morris Dance, as relief for one of the patrol boats sent following the initial coup d'état earlier that month. The Australian government decided on 29 May that the situation had stabilised, with Townsville sailing for home that day.

On 1 June 1990, the patrol boat intercepted a vessel carrying Cambodian refugees off Bathurst Island. The vessel began sinking while the boarding and inspection was underway, with the personnel of Townsville rescuing 45 men, 17 women, and 17 children, and transporting them to Darwin. The following month, the patrol boat was in Nuku'Alofa for celebrations of the King of Tonga's birthday.

In January 1992, Townsville was used as the platform from which a team of clearance divers disposed of undetonated bombs found on Middleton Reef.

In July 1993, Townsville was used for water flow and cavitation experiments on the vessel's propellers. Two windows were inserted into the ship's hull above the propellers to allow filming of these effects.

During February 1994, Townsville visited several Papua New Guinean ports while conducting patrol operations in the Coral Sea.

In August 1995, Townsville participated in celebrations of the 50th anniversary of the end of World War II in the Pacific theatre.

From 24 to 28 May 1999, the patrol boat operated off Thursday Island as part of a sweep for illegal activity.

== Decommissioning and fate ==
In 2007, Townsville was marked for disposal. On 23 April, the Australian Government announced Townsville had been gifted to the Maritime Museum of Townsville as a museum ship.The patrol boat was decommissioned at HMAS Cairns on 11 May 2007, in a joint ceremony with HMAS Ipswich. The two patrol boats were the last of the class in active service.

Townsville was berthed from 2007-2015 at the former Curtain Bros. wharf in Ross Creek.

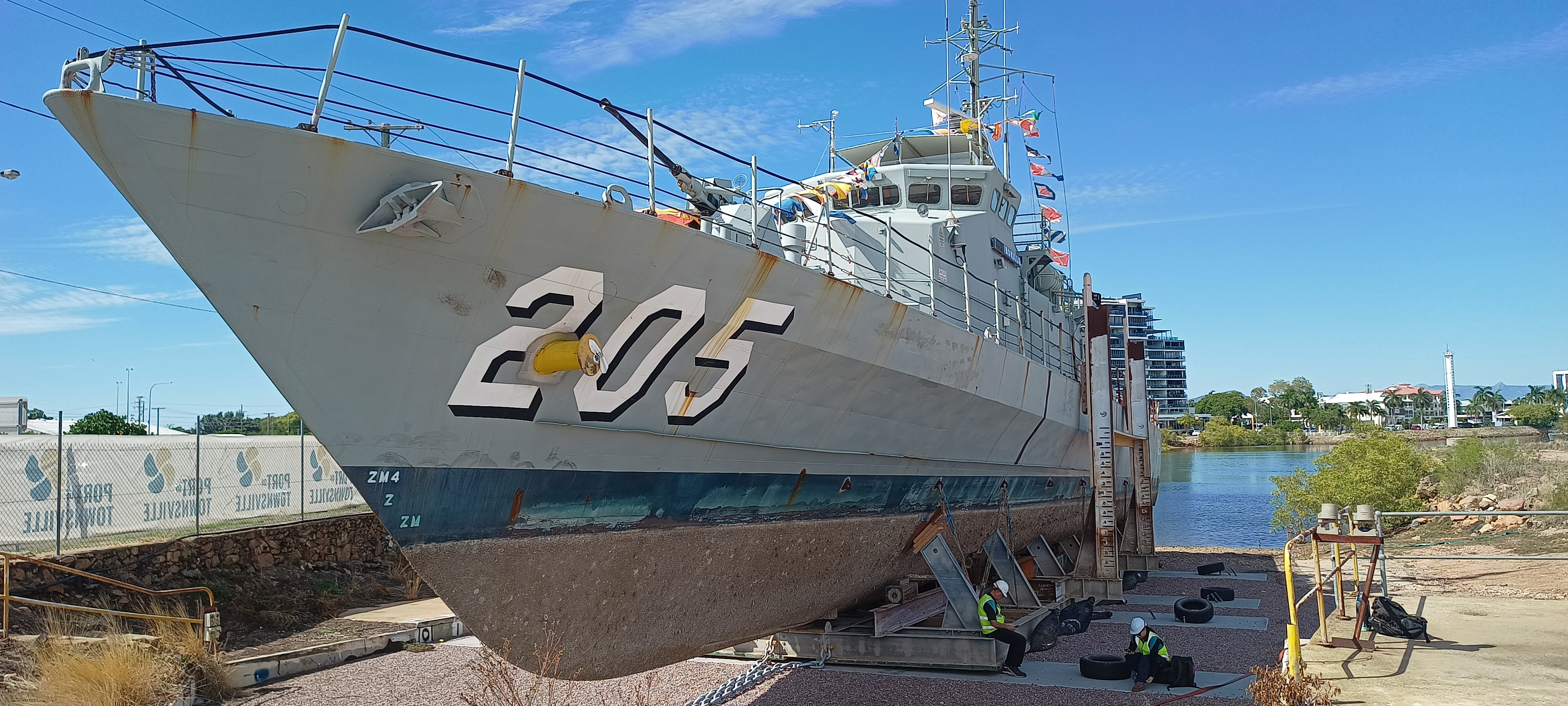
HMAS Townsville on the Curtain Brothers slipway, December 2025

In July 2015 the former Townsville Maritime Museum and Historical Society was replaced by Townsville Maritime Museum Limited, a statutory not-for-profit company.

In 2015-2016 the vessel underwent a major marine hull refurbishment at the Norship shipyard in Cairns. Following that, she was reberthed as a floating vessel at the Townsville Marine Precinct.

Following extensive remediation works during 2024-2025, the vessel was towed from the Townsville Marine Precinct to the Curtain Brother slipway on 22 July 2025. Installed on permanent cradles fixed to the slipway, she is now a dry, static museum vessel, benefiting ongoing conservation and maintenance works and safe access to the public.
