= HMAS Stalwart (D 215) =

Australian-designed Escot Maintenance ship of the Royal Australian Navy

History

Australia
- Builder: Cockatoo Island Dockyard in Sydney
- Laid down: 23 June 1964
- Launched: 7 October 1966
- Completed: 8 February 1968
- Commissioned: 9 February 1968
- Decommissioned: 9 March 1990
- Home port: HMAS Kuttabul
- Identification: IMO number: 8828903
- Motto: "Heart of Oak"
- Nickname(s): "Building 215"; "The Mighty 'Wart"; "Battlestar"
- Fate: Sold into civilian service in 1990, scrapped in 2003

General characteristics
- Type: Escort Maintenance Ship
- Displacement: 15,000 tons (designed); 15,500 tonnes (actual)
- Length: 515 ft 6 in (157.12 m) loa; 458 ft (140 m) p/p
- Beam: 67 ft 6 in (20.57 m)
- Draught: 20 ft 1 in (6.12 m)
- Propulsion: 2 × 6-cylinder Scott-Sulzer diesels of 7,000 hp (5,200 kW) driving twin screws
- Speed: Over 20 knots (37 km/h; 23 mph)
- Armament: 2 × 40 mm (1.6 in) Bofors anti-aircraft guns; Fitted for, but not with: Sea Cat anti-aircraft missile systems
- Aircraft carried: One utility helicopter (Wessex; later Sea King)

HMAS Stalwart (A 215/D 215) was an Australian-designed and constructed Escort Maintenance ship of the Royal Australian Navy (RAN). Commissioned on 9 February 1968 and decommissioned on 9 March 1990, Stalwart served as a destroyer tender, the RAN flagship, and a training vessel during her career. She was sold in 1993 for conversion into a short-range cruise ship, under the names MV Her Majesty M, then MV Tara II. The vessel did not enter civilian service before she was broken up for scrap in 2003.

== Design and construction ==
The ship was designed by Navy Office in Canberra to provide afloat support for the RAN, primarily by providing maintenance and minor repairs to the navy's destroyers and frigates. 75 percent of the ship's company were geared towards the maintenance role. Stalwart could perform these tasks at sea, and could operate out of minor ports or forward bases around and away from Australia. Up to four ships could be assisted simultaneously, with Stalwart providing power, water, communications, and personnel facilities for the ships' companies of those alongside.

Stalwart was designed with a displacement of 15,000 tons, although her actual displacement was 15,500 tons. This was the largest displacement of any ship operated by the RAN to that point, except for the two Majestic-class aircraft carriers and the battlecruiser HMAS Australia. Stalwart was 515 feet 6 inches (157.12 m) long overall, 458 feet (140 m) long between perpendiculars, had a beam of 67 feet 6 inches (20.57 m), and a draught of 20 feet 1 inch (6.12 m). Propulsion was provided by two 6-cylinder Scott-Sulzer diesels, which provided 7,000 horsepower (5,200 kW) to the ship's two propellers, and allowing Stalwart to sail at over 20 knots (37 km/h; 23 mph).

The size of the ship's company varies between sources: Cassells states a complement of 396, while the RAN website gives 25 officers and 392 sailors. Stalwart's armament consisted of two 40 mm Bofors anti-aircraft guns. The ship was fitted for but not with two Sea Cat missile launchers. A single helicopter was carried for utility purposes; initially, this was a Westland Wessex, although it was later replaced by a Westland Sea King. The ship's helipad was capable of receiving any helicopter flown by the RAN.

Stalwart was laid down by the Cockatoo Docks and Engineering Company Limited in Sydney on 23 June 1964. She was launched by Lady Maie Casey, wife of the Governor-General on 1 October 1966. Stalwart was commissioned into the RAN on 1 February 1968, a day after she was completed. The ship's name came from the destroyer HMAS Stalwart. She carried several nicknames, including "Building 215" (referring to the fact that, when not deployed, she was always secured to the same buoy just off HMAS Kuttabul at Sydney), "The Mighty 'Wart", and "Battlestar".

== Operational history ==
On 14 November 1974, Stalwart was present at Port Moresby for Papua New Guinean independence celebrations. On 27 December 1974, after Cyclone Tracy destroyed Darwin, Stalwart sailed from Sydney as part of the disaster relief effort Operation Navy Help Darwin. The vessel arrived on 2 January 1975, and was the only vessel to dock alongside in Darwin Harbour (the other 12 ships deployed were anchored in or outside the harbour). Stalwart remained until 30 January, during which she provided workshop and maintenance facilities, was used to provide electricity to the city, and her ship's company performed an average of 1,000 man-hours of cleanup and reconstruction work per day. She was one of the last two RAN ships to leave, and arrived back in Sydney on 6 February.

The ship started 1976 by participating in training exercises off south-east Australia and in Bass Strait. Stalwart visited New Zealand in June, returned to Sydney for refit, visited New Zealand and Nouméa in September, then undertook a circumnavigation of Australia, which concluded in Sydney on 9 December.

In 1980, Stalwart undertook exercises of Victoria, before visiting Newcastle for Australia Day, Hobart for the Royal Hobart Regatta, then Melbourne and Sydney before March. In May, the role of Flagship of the RAN was transferred from HMAS Melbourne to Stalwart. During September and October, the ship participated in Exercise Kangaroo 81.

Stalwart was deployed on a three-month flag-showing cruise through South-East Asia during late 1984. During this deployment, the ship visited China, Indonesia, Singapore, Hong Kong, and the Philippines.

On 22 October 1985, while en route from Darwin to Indonesia, a combination of cleaning chemicals and the contents of the ship's sullage tanks caused hydrogen sulfide gas to form. 62 people had to be evacuated to Darwin by helicopter after inhaling the gas, and 3 were killed; one was posthumously awarded the Bravery Medal for his actions during the incident. In November, the ship was sent to resupply the Antarctic research station at Macquarie Island after the Australian National Antarctic Research Expedition vessel Nella Dan became beset by ice. The ship took on supplies and unloaded 85 sailors at Jervis Bay on 31 November to make room for the civilians and their equipment, before sailing to Hobart and taking on more supplies and a 41-strong relief team. She sailed on 4 December to Macquarie Island, and successfully transferred the relief team and supplies, receiving 33 men for transport back to Australia.

In late May 1986, the vessel was sent to the Solomon Islands on a disaster relief mission following heavy storms. In September, Stalwart hosted a meeting of the Cabinet of Australia.

During the late 1980s, the ship focused less on her role as a maintenance vessel (primarily because the United States-designed vessels entering service were easier to self-maintain at shore facilities), and more on her role as Flagship, by sending most of her maintenance personnel ashore and hosting the staff of the Flag Officer Commanding Australian Fleet and the Royal Australian Navy Fleet Band.

She took part in precautionary deployments to Fiji (Operation Morris Dance) and Vanuatu during 1987 and 1988. From 15 January 1989, Stalwart began scaling down her ship's company and operations; the extra space for personnel and the superior facilities on board saw her transferred to the training squadron.

== Decommissioning, civilian career, and fate ==
Stalwart was decommissioned on 9 March 1990 at Fleet Base East. The ship was sold to the Cyprus-based Royal Sea Ferries on 3 March 1990 for conversion into a Mediterranean cruise ship. The vessel was named MV Her Majesty M. She was later renamed MV Tara II. The ship did not enter commercial service, and on 19 February 2003, Tara II arrived at Alang, India for breaking.
