= Operation Morris Dance =

Australian military operation

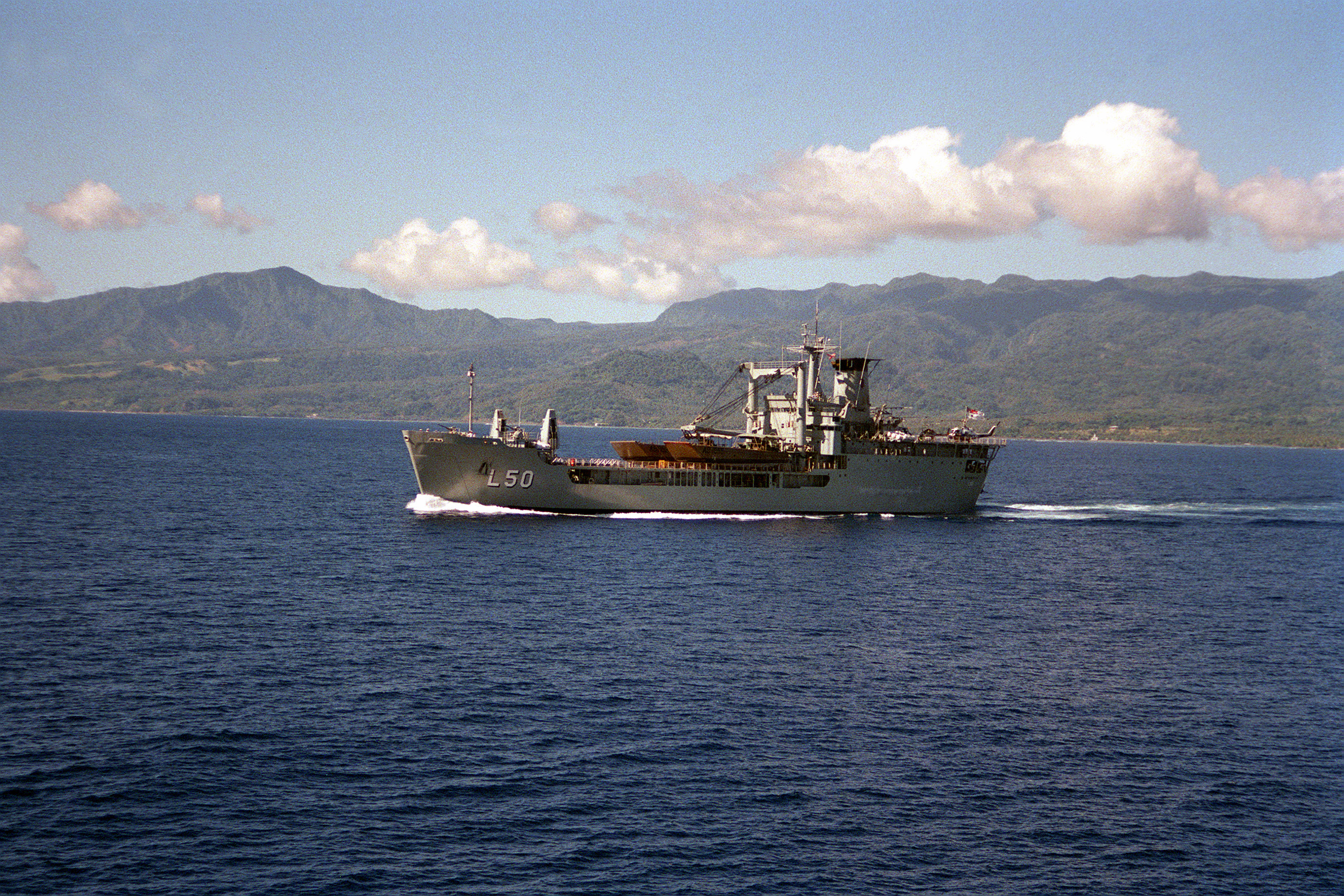
- HMAS Tobruk during an exercise in 1987
- Planned: May 1987
- Planned by: Australian Defence Force
- Objective: To evacuate Australian citizens from Fiji
- Date: 14–29 May 1987
- Executed by: HMAS Stalwart, HMAS Sydney, HMAS Parramatta, HMAS Success, HMAS Tobruk, B Company, 1 RAR, 104th Signal Squadron
- Outcome: Evacuation was not required and the units involved returned to Australia on 29 May

Operation Morris Dance was an Australian military operation conducted in May 1987 in response to the first of the 1987 Fijian coups d'état.

On the morning of 14 May 1987 the Military of Fiji took control of the country in a bloodless coup d'état. In response to the coup, the Australian Defence Force (ADF) began preparations to evacuate Australian citizens from Fiji. Five Australian warships (HMA Ships Stalwart, Sydney, Parramatta, Success, and Tobruk) were deployed to patrol south-west of Fiji. 'B' Company, 1st Battalion, Royal Australian Regiment was added to this force on 23 May, with the soldiers being flown from Townsville to Norfolk Island and transferred by helicopter to Stalwart, Tobruk, Sydney and Success. The Australian task force remained off Fiji until 29 May, when the situation in the country had stabilised.

== Background ==
In the years after the Vietnam War, Australia's defence policy shifted away from emphasising 'forward defence': countering potential threats as far from Australia as possible, typically through joint operations with allied forces. This was replaced by the 'Defence of Australia Policy', which involved reorienting the military's capabilities to improve its ability for independent operations in Australia's immediate region. The guidance provided by the government was unclear, however, and retarded the development of an integrated ADF with the force structure needed to meet the Defence of Australia requirements. The ADF made few deployments in the years after 1972 due to the stable international situation and the focus on the defence of Australia. While the deployments which took place provided useful experience for the units involved, they did not test the ADF's ability to conduct joint operations.

During the mid-1980s, the Australian Government sought to clarify Australia's defence policy. The 'Dibb Report', which had been commissioned by Minister for Defence Kim Beazley to provide information on priorities for defence planning and the ADF's requirements, was released in 1986. This report recommended that the ADF be focused on the defence of Australia but also have a modest ability to deploy forces within Australia's region in support of diplomatic interests and other countries military efforts. This recommendation was accepted by the Government and was incorporated into the Defence white paper released in 1987.

The Army's main force suited to overseas deployments was the Operational Deployment Force (ODF), which was centred on the 3rd Brigade, based at Townsville. The ODF was required to be able to deploy an infantry company group (designated the Advance Company Group or ACG) within seven days, and the entire 3rd Brigade within 28 days. Responsibility for providing the rapid reaction force was rotated between the brigade's infantry battalions. The ADF's main transport assets were the Royal Australian Air Force's 24 C-130 Hercules transport aircraft and the Navy's amphibious heavy lift ship HMAS Tobruk.

On 14 May 1987, ten soldiers led by Lieutenant Colonel Sitiveni Rabuka, the RFMF's third in command, overthrew the Fijian Government. The coup was supported by most of the RFMF and the traditional Fijian chiefly hierarchy.

== Initial military response ==
While the Australian Government condemned the military takeover, it quickly ruled out interfering in Fiji's political process. The Government also gave some consideration to facilitating the return of the RFMF units stationed in the Middle East to restore democracy under the leadership of the RFMF's commander, who was visiting Australia at the time. This option was rejected due to the military government's initial popularity and the risk of civil war.

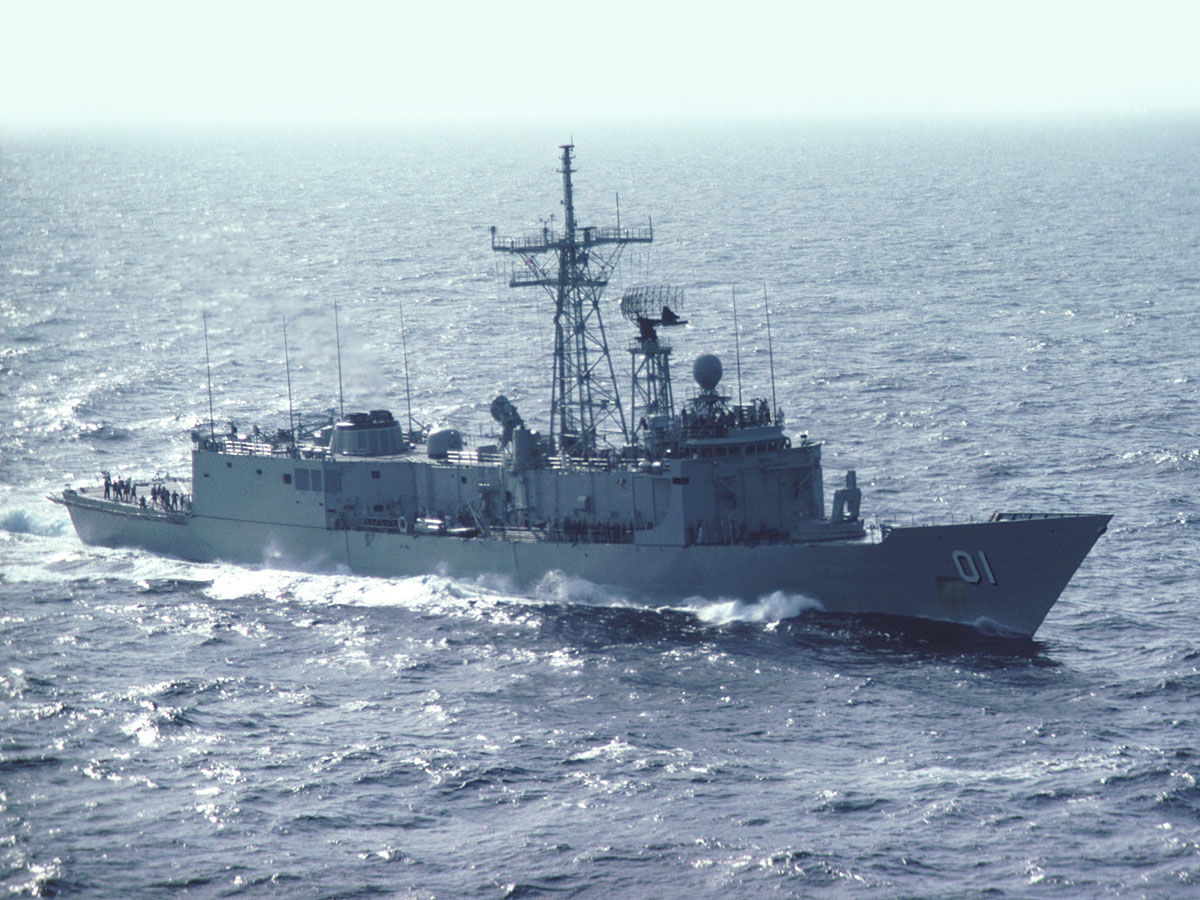
A 1982 photo of HMAS Adelaide

At the time of the coup an unusually large number of RAN warships were at or near Fiji on deployments which had been scheduled well in advance. The Adelaide-class frigates Adelaide and Sydney arrived at Lautoka and Suva respectively on 14 May. The Fremantle-class patrol boats Cessnock and Wollongong also arrived at Lautoka on 15 May. In addition, the RAN's flagship, the destroyer tender Stalwart was 600 miles to the north at Tuvalu and the River-class destroyer escort Parramatta was enroute for Pago Pago, American Samoa. Both these ships were diverted to patrol near Fiji's territorial waters. All these ships were maintained at or near Fiji to evacuate Australians if the situation worsened.

For the first week after the coup, the Australia's military response was limited to maintaining the naval vessels at or near Fiji and suspending aid to the RFMF provided under the Defence Cooperation Program. The naval vessels ships provided secure communications between the Australian High Commission in Suva and a means of evacuating Australian nationals if the situation worsened. While the Government did not believe that an evacuation would become necessary, the ship Stalwart docked at Suva and ships Adelaide and Sydney docked at Lautoka. They all remained docked after their diplomatic clearance expired on 18 May, leaving only on 20 May after the Fijian Governor-General's office ordered then to depart. Stalwart, Adelaide and Sydney subsequently cruised just outside Fiji's territorial waters.

Planning for the evacuation of the 4,000 to 5,000 Australians estimated to be in Fiji was also conducted. At the time of the coup, the 1st Battalion, Royal Australian Regiment (1 RAR) was the ODF battalion responsible for responding to emergencies. On 15 May the ODF asked Land Headquarters whether it should bring the ACG to a higher level of readiness. In response, Land Headquarters directed that the ACG's readiness level not be changed to prevent rumours that the Australian Government was considering a military intervention. Staff officers at Headquarters Australian Defence Force met in secret on 16 May, however, to consider options for conducting an evacuation. When Defence Minister Beazley, Chief of the Defence Force General Peter Gration and secretary of the Department of Defence Alan Woods returned to Canberra from a trip to Western Australia on 17 May they were briefed on the situation in Fiji and authorised the development of formal options for an evacuation.

Headquarters ADF began work began on evacuation plans on 18 May. This planning resulted in maritime and air evacuation options based around the assumption that the RFMF and Fijian police would be cooperative. An option to deploy Australian troops to open routes to airports and ports was included, however, due to concerns that civil unrest could block the movement of foreign nationals.

== Troop deployment ==
Over the next week, the Australian Government began to perceive that the situation in Fiji was deteriorating. Media reports highlighted incidents where the RFMF behaved brutally towards protesters, rioting, a bombing and arson. On 19 May, an Air New Zealand Boeing 747 aircraft was hijacked at Nadi International Airport for six hours, and Prime Minister Hawke reportedly considered deploying Australian special forces if requested by Fiji to rescue the aircraft's passengers. The New Zealand Government announced on 20 May that it had placed its military forces, notably the New Zealand Special Air Service, on alert to evacuate its citizens from Fiji, and there was growing speculation in the Australian media about an Australian military intervention.

Preparations for the evacuation of foreign nationals continued on 19 and 20 May. The Chiefs of Staff Committee (COSC) met on 20 May to consider the situation and evacuation options if they were necessary. The COSC determined that an evacuation coordinated by the Australian embassy in Suva using chartered civil aircraft was the preferred option, and that the readiness of the ODF was not to be changed. The reluctance to bring an infantry unit to a higher level of readiness was related to the political sensitivity of being seen to be preparing to intervene on the same day that Australian ships had been ordered to leave Fijian waters. The first formal orders for what was now designated Operation Morris Dance were issued on 20 May, when the Maritime Commander, Rear Admiral Peter Sinclair, was assigned full command over the operation. Army landing craft were then assigned to Tobruk, and signallers from 104th Signal Squadron Holsworthy assigned to Success. Tobruk and Success were both at port at Garden Island in Sydney.

After taking command, Sinclair assessed that the companies of the ships off Fiji could not provide sufficient personnel to co-ordinate an evacuation. He asked Gration to provide troops to bolster his strength, and this was authorised by Cabinet in a meeting held on 21 May. By this time, Australia had received requests from seven countries, including the United States and Japan, to evacuate their citizens from Fiji if required. Despite taking this step, the Australian government believed that it was unlikely that law and order would break down in Fiji, with Foreign Minister Gareth Evans telling the media that he thought that there was a 20 percent chance of this occurring. At no stage was it considered possible that the ODF would be involved with fighting against the RFMF, and it was assumed that the Fijian military would want to help assist the evacuation of foreign nationals from the country.

1 RAR was first instructed to prepare the ACG, which at the time was centred around B Company, on the morning of 21 May. That afternoon, the ACG was formally ordered to be ready to deploy at two hours notice. The under-strength company was reinforced by personnel from elsewhere in the battalion. The battalion's officers had been instructed to keep the potential deployment secret, and were not able to inform their men of it until 7 pm, one and a half hours after Townsville radio stations had broadcast the Prime Minister's announcement that the ACG had been ordered to stand by. A squadron of the Special Air Service Regiment was also alerted for a possible deployment to Fiji, but did not leave Australia.

On 21 May, the ACG was flown from RAAF Base Townsville to Norfolk Island, where it was to be transferred to Success and Tobruk. Four RAAF C-130s transported the company group and its equipment that morning, though loading the aircraft took longer than expected due to a shortage of pallets and specialist loading staff. Once at Norfolk Island, the company group had to repack its equipment into smaller containers, as those originally used could not be carried by the Navy's Wessex helicopters. These helicopters transferred the Army force onto Tobruk during the night, which was dangerous as they were not equipped for night flying. The soldiers were not familiar with the ship, and the process of unpacking and storing their equipment was also slow.

After embarkation was complete, Success and Tobruk proceeded to Fiji, where they joined the RAN force off the island. At this point, Adelaide was withdrawn to attend a pre-planned exercise with the USS Midway carrier battle group. Stalwart was granted permission to dock in Suva Harbour, and the Australian High Commission had begun registering Australians and other foreign nationals and designating safe havens for them to move to if order broke down. On 26 May, the ACG was transferred from Tobruk to other ships, as the heavy lift ship was needed to support the Pacific Forum meeting at Apia, Samoa. Troop movements were conducted in dangerous high-wind conditions using the ships' embarked helicopters: three became unserviceable during the operation, while a fourth crashed onto Tobruk's deck. There were no injuries, which was fortunate as Gration had not deemed it necessary to include surgical personnel or equipment in the force, under the assumption that any evacuation would be unopposed.

On 29 May, the Australian Government decided that the situation in Fiji had stabilised. Accordingly, the ADF force on the island began to be reduced, with Parramatta and the patrol boats Dubbo and Townsville (which had relieved sister ships Wollongong and Cessnock) departing for Australia that day. Stalwart left Fiji on 30 May, and Sydney and Success followed on 3 June. The ACG returned with the ships, and was back in Townsville by 7 June.

Operation Morris Dance was the first operational deployment of an Australian infantry unit since the Vietnam War.

== Aftermath ==
Within a year of Operation Morris Dance, the Army determined that a capability to move at least a company group from ship to shore in a single helicopter lift was needed. To meet this requirement the Navy would need to be able to launch six helicopters, each carrying 20 soldiers, simultaneously from one or more ships. In the mid-1990s, two Kanimbla-class landing platform amphibious were acquired as a result of the lessons learned from Operation Morris Dance, but each of these ships could only move a platoon per lift. In June 2007, the Australian Government approved the purchase of two Canberra-class landing helicopter docks, each of which would be able to simultaneously operate six helicopters.
