= HMAS Melbourne (R21) =

1955–1982 Majestic-class aircraft carrier of Royal Australian Navy

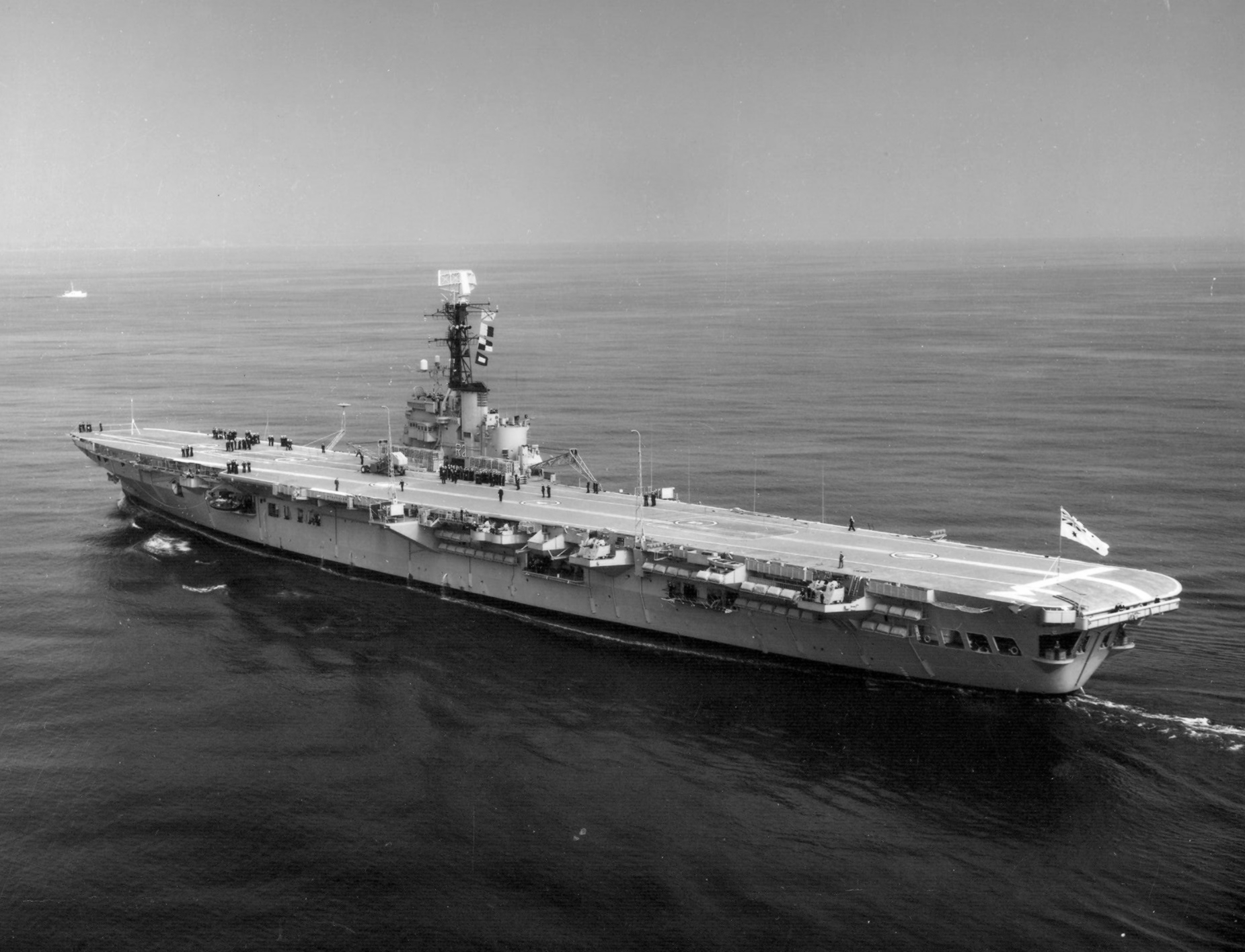
- HMAS Melbourne in 1967

History

Australia
- Namesake: City of Melbourne
- Ordered: 1943
- Builder: Vickers-Armstrongs, Barrow-in-Furness
- Laid down: 15 April 1943
- Launched: 28 February 1945 as HMS Majestic
- Christened: 26 October 1955 as HMAS Majestic
- Commissioned: 28 October 1955 as HMAS Melbourne
- Decommissioned: 30 May 1982
- Motto: Vires Acquirit Eundo; Latin: "She Gathers Strength As She Goes"
- Nickname(s): Little M, HMAS Can Opener
- Honours and awards: Battle honours: Malaysia 1965–66; plus two inherited honours
- Fate: Sold for scrap
- Badge

General characteristics
- Class & type: Modified Majestic-class light aircraft carrier
- Displacement: Standard: 15,740 long tons (17,630 short tons); Full load: 20,000 long tons (22,000 short tons)
- Length: 213.97 m (702 ft) overall; Increased by 2.43 m (8 ft) in 1969
- Beam: 24.38 m (80 ft)
- Draught: 7.62 m (25 ft)
- Propulsion: Two Parsons single-reduction geared turbine sets; four Admiralty 3-drum boilers; two screws (port: 3 blade, starboard: 4 blade); 40,000 shp (30,000 kW)
- Speed: 24 knots (44 km/h; 28 mph)
- Range: 12,000 nautical miles (22,000 km; 14,000 mi) at 14 knots (26 km/h; 16 mph); 6,200 nautical miles (11,500 km; 7,100 mi) at 23 knots (43 km/h; 26 mph)
- Complement: 1,350, including 350 Air Group personnel
- Sensors & processing systems: Radar: 1955–1968: 3 × Type 277Q height-finding set; 1 × Type 293Q surface search set; 1 × Type 978 navigational set; 1969–1982: 1 × Type 293Q surface search set; 1 × Type 978 navigational set; 1 × LW-02 air search set; 1 × SPN-35 landing aid radar
- Armament: 1955–1959: 25 × 40 mm Bofors anti-aircraft guns (6 twin mountings, 13 single mountings); 1959–1968: 21 × Bofors (6 twin, 9 single); 1969–1980: 12 × Bofors (4 twin, 4 single); 1980–1982: 4 × Bofors (4 single)
- Aircraft carried: Up to 27 aircraft, including helicopters

HMAS Melbourne (R21) was a Majestic-class light aircraft carrier operated by the Royal Australian Navy (RAN) from 1955 until 1982, and was the third and final conventional aircraft carrier (Note: For the purpose of this article, a conventional aircraft carrier is defined as a ship designed primarily to launch and recover multiple fixed-wing aircraft from a flight deck, and operated as such. This definition does not include seaplane tender HMAS Albatross, or the Canberra-class amphibious warfare ships.) to serve in the RAN. Melbourne was the only Commonwealth naval vessel to sink two friendly warships in peacetime collisions.

Melbourne was laid down for the Royal Navy as the lead ship of the Majestic class in April 1943, and was launched as HMS Majestic (R77) in February 1945. At the end of the Second World War, work on the ship was suspended until she was purchased by the RAN in 1947. At the time of purchase, it was decided to incorporate new aircraft carrier technologies into the design, making Melbourne the third ship to be constructed with an angled flight deck. Delays in construction and integrating the enhancements meant that the carrier was not commissioned until 1955.

Melbourne never fired a shot in anger during her service career, having only peripheral, non-combat roles in relation to the Indonesia-Malaysia confrontation and the Vietnam War. She was, however, involved in two major collisions with allied vessels; though Melbourne was not found to be the primary cause of either incident. The first collision occurred on the evening of 10 February 1964, in which Melbourne rammed and sank the RAN destroyer HMAS Voyager, when the latter altered course across her bow. 82 of Voyager's personnel were killed, and two Royal Commissions were held to investigate the incident. The second collision occurred in the early morning of 3 June 1969, when Melbourne also rammed the United States Navy (USN) destroyer USS Frank E. Evans in similar circumstances. 74 American personnel died, and a joint USN–RAN Board of Inquiry was held. These incidents, along with several minor collisions, shipboard accidents and aircraft losses, led to the belief that Melbourne was jinxed.

Melbourne was paid off from RAN service in 1982. A proposal to convert her for use as a floating casino failed, and a 1984 sale was cancelled, before she was sold for scrap in 1985 and towed to China for breaking. The scrapping was delayed so Melbourne could be studied by the People's Liberation Army Navy (PLAN) as part of a secret project to develop a Chinese aircraft carrier and used to train PLAN aviators in carrier flight operations.

== Construction and acquisition ==
Melbourne was constructed by Vickers-Armstrongs at their Naval Construction Yard in Barrow-in-Furness, North West England. The ship was laid down as HMS Majestic on 15 April 1943, and was launched on 28 February 1945 by Lady Anderson, the wife of Sir John Anderson, the British Chancellor of the Exchequer. Following the end of World War II, the Admiralty ordered the suspension of many British shipbuilding projects, including the fitting out of Majestic and her five sister ships. Construction resumed in 1946, and major modifications to the design were incorporated.

A review by the Australian Government's Defence Committee held after World War II recommended that the post-war forces of the RAN be structured around a Task Force incorporating multiple aircraft carriers. Initial plans were for three carriers, with two active and a third in reserve, although funding cuts led to the purchase of only two carriers in June 1947: Majestic and sister ship HMS Terrible, for the combined cost of AU£2.75 million, (Note: Monetary figures in this article shown are for the value of the Australian pound or dollar at that time, and have not been adjusted or converted.) plus stores, fuel, and ammunition. As Terrible was the closer of the two ships to completion, she was finished without modification, and was commissioned into the RAN on 16 December 1948 as HMAS Sydney. Work progressed on Majestic at a slower rate, as she was upgraded with the latest technology and equipment. The Colossus-class carrier HMS Vengeance was loaned to the RAN from 13 November 1952 until 12 August 1955 to cover Majestic's absence.

The Majestic experienced delays in its construction due to labour difficulties, late delivery of equipment, additional requirements for Australian operations and the prioritisation of the construction of merchant ships. Incorporation of new systems and enhancements caused the cost of the RAN carrier acquisition program to increase to AU£8.3 million. Construction and fitting out did not finish until October 1955. As the carrier neared completion, a commissioning crew was formed in Australia and first used to return Vengeance to the United Kingdom.

The completed carrier was commissioned into the RAN as HMAS Majestic on 26 October 1955. Two days later, the ship was renamed Melbourne by Lady White, the wife of Sir Thomas White, the Australian High Commissioner to the United Kingdom, and recommissioned.

== Design ==
As the lead ship of the Majestic-class of light aircraft carriers, Melbourne was conceived as a modified version of the Colossus-class carrier, incorporating improvements in flight deck design and habitability. Majestic- and Colossus-class carriers were almost identical in hull design and both were considered subclasses of the "1942 design" light aircraft carrier program. These carriers were intended as "disposable warships": to be disposed of at the end of World War II or within three years of entering service.

Melbourne had a standard displacement of 15,740 long tons (17,630 short tons), which increased to 20,000 long tons (22,000 short tons) at full load. At launch, the carrier was 213.97 metres (702.0 ft) long overall, but this was increased by 2.43 metres (8.0 ft) during a refit in 1969. She had a beam of 24.38 metres (80.0 ft), and a draught of 7.62 metres (25.0 ft). Melbourne's two propellers were driven by two Parsons single-reduction geared turbine sets providing 40,000 shp, which were powered by four Admiralty 3-drum boilers. The carrier could achieve a top speed of 24 knots (44 km/h; 28 mph), and a range of 12,000 nautical miles (22,000 km; 14,000 mi) at 14 knots (26 km/h; 16 mph) or 6,200 nautical miles (11,500 km; 7,100 mi) at 23 knots (43 km/h; 26 mph). The size of the ship's company averaged 1,350 officers and sailors, including 350 personnel from the embarked Fleet Air Arm squadrons.

=== Modifications during construction ===
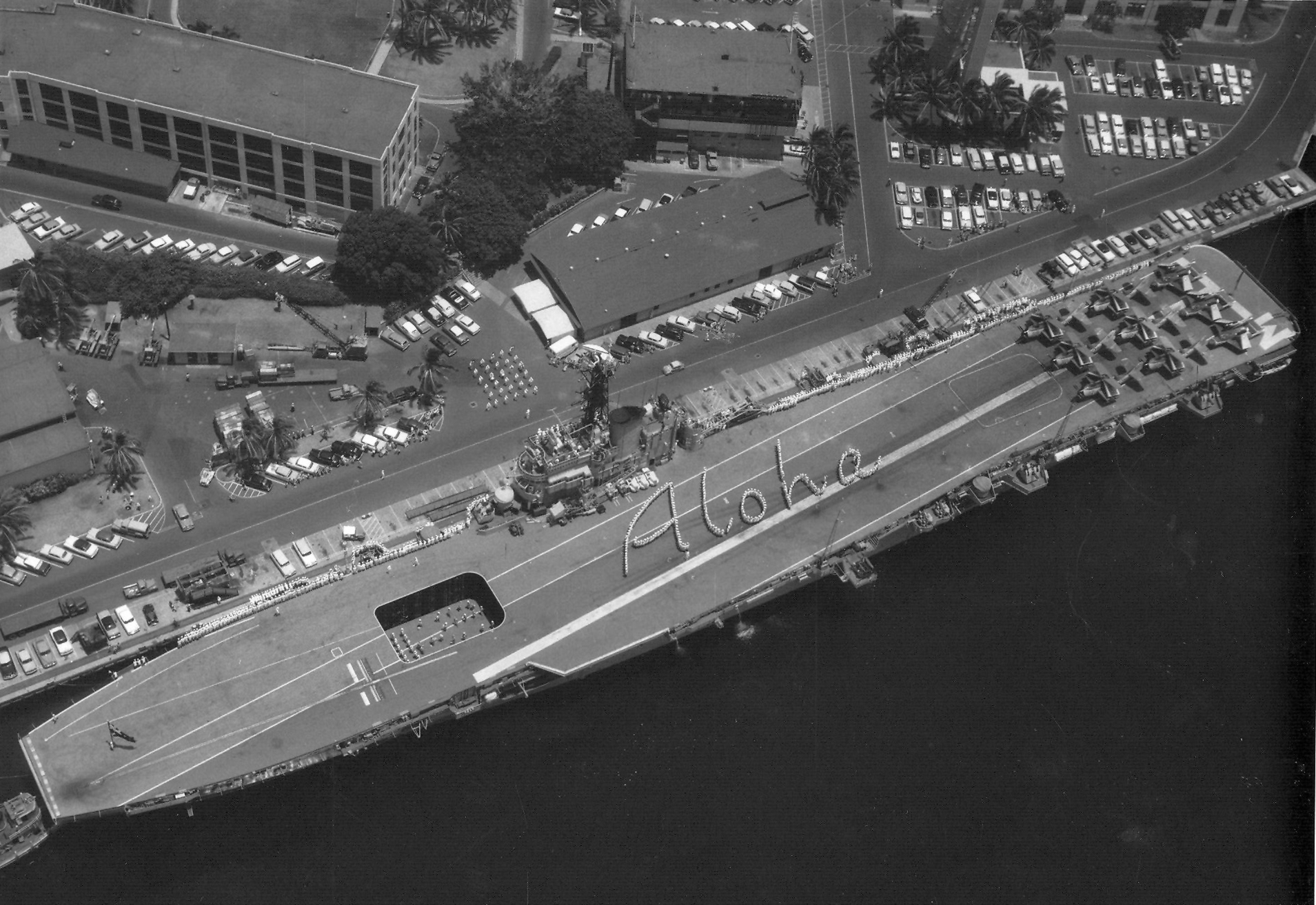
Aerial photograph of Melbourne docked at Pearl Harbor, showing the angled flight deck. June 1958.

Following the recommencement of construction, modifications were made to the ship, based on wartime experience and Britain's post-war carrier warfare technology and innovations. These included an angled flight deck, steam catapult and a mirror landing aid, making Melbourne the third aircraft carrier (following HMS Ark Royal and USS Forrestal) to be constructed with these features, instead of having them added later.

The main modifications centred around the need to operate jet aircraft, which were larger and heavier than those propeller-driven aircraft that the carrier was originally designed for. The flight deck was angled 5.5 degrees left of the carrier's centreline, to allow for the simultaneous launch and recovery of aircraft. Despite an increase to approximately one acre (4,000 square metres, 4,800 square yards) in area, the deck was still significantly smaller than other Cold War era carriers; S-2 Trackers, with their 22.12-metre (72 ft 7 in) wingspan, had less than a metre's clearance for their starboard wingtip when landing, and pilots from other navies often refused to attempt landing. Water rationing was required in the early years of the carrier's operation, as the ship's fresh water supply was insufficient to freely provide for the steam catapult, propulsion turbines and crew. The flight deck, hangar deck and aircraft lifts were strengthened, and reinforced arrestor cables were installed. Flight direction radar was included, making Melbourne the only military airfield in the Australasian region at the time capable of operating aircraft at night and in poor weather.

=== Refits ===
Early in her career, Melbourne underwent a series of short annual refits, commencing in September and ending in January or February of the next year. As time passed, the refits increased in duration or were replaced by major upgrades or overhauls.

Melbourne's first major refit started in December 1967 and continued until February 1969, during which she was upgraded to operate S-2 Tracker and A-4 Skyhawk aircraft. The modifications cost A$8.5 million, and included an overhaul of the hull and machinery, strengthening of the flight deck, improvements to the catapult and arrestor cables, modification of the aviation fuel systems and flight control arrangements, and upgrades of the navigational aids and radar. Air conditioning systems and a liquid oxygen generation plant were also installed. Melbourne re-entered service at the conclusion of the refits on 14 February, and performed sea trials in Jervis Bay from 17 February until 5 May. This was the largest project undertaken by Garden Island Dockyard to that date.

The next major refit was required in 1971 for the scheduled rebuilding of the catapult, which was only possible after components were sourced from HMCS Bonaventure and USS Coral Sea. The flight deck was again reinforced and strengthened, and attempts were made to increase the effectiveness of the air conditioning system installed in 1969. Melbourne had been designed to operate in North Atlantic and Arctic climates, and the original ventilation systems were inappropriate for her primary operating climate, the tropics. The 1969 and 1971 refits did improve conditions, although there was little scope for upgrade, and the system was still inadequate: temperatures inside the ship continued to reach over 65 °C (149 °F), and on one occasion a hold reached 78 °C (172 °F). The refit took seven months to complete, and cost A$2 million.

More large-scale refits occurred throughout the rest of the 1970s. Melbourne was back in dock from November 1972 until August 1973, with further work done to her catapult. The next major refit ran from April 1975 to June 1976, and was intended to increase the operational lifespan of the carrier to at least 1985. The refit was lengthened by industrial action at the dockyard. Melbourne underwent another refit from late 1978 until August 1979. A refit scheduled to begin in late 1981 was postponed in September until a decision regarding the new carrier was made, then cancelled in January 1982, after the announcement that the RAN would be acquiring HMS Invincible.

== Armament ==
Melbourne carried a defensive armament of anti-aircraft guns and an air group comprising both attack and anti-submarine aircraft. As the ship was never directly involved in a conflict, her weapons and embarked aircraft did not fire a shot in anger.

=== Weapons and systems ===
Melbourne's initial armament included 25 40 mm Bofors anti-aircraft guns: six twin and thirteen single mountings. The radar suite consisted of three Type 277Q height-finding sets, a Type 293Q surface search set, and a Type 978 navigational set. Between entering service and 1959, four of the single Bofors were removed.

During the 1967–1969 refit, thirteen Bofors were removed, leaving four twin and four single mountings. The three 277Q radars were replaced with updated American and Dutch designs: a LW-02 air search set and a SPN-35 landing aid radar. A TACAN aerial and electronic countermeasures pods were also installed during this refit. The four Bofors twin mountings were removed in 1980.

=== Aircraft ===
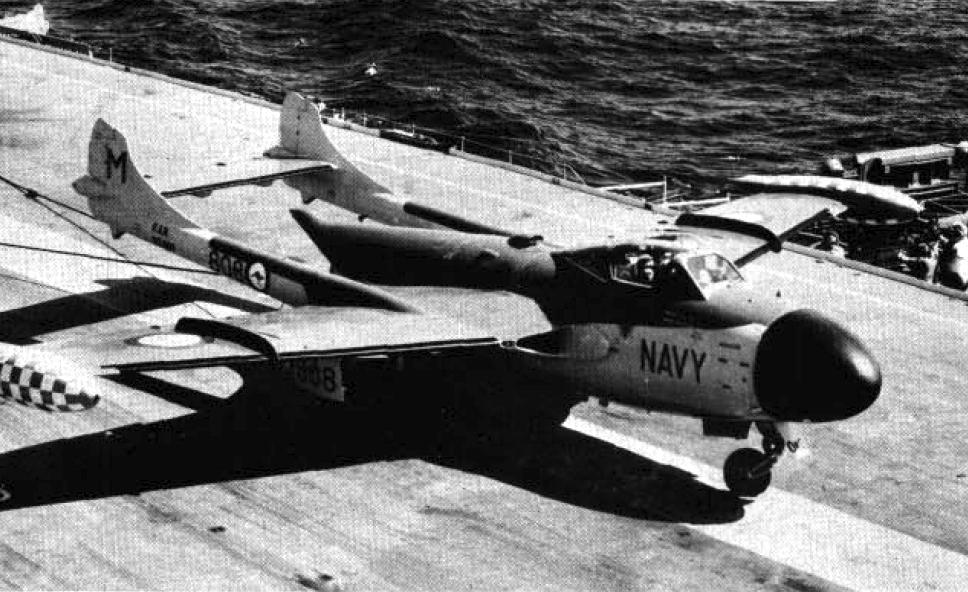
A de Havilland Sea Venom, with arrestor gear still connected, has just landed on Melbourne, 1962

Melbourne carried three Fleet Air Arm squadrons. Initially, she had up to 22 fixed wing and 2 rotary wing aircraft embarked at any time. The number of aircraft gradually increased until 1972, when the air group peaked at 27 aircraft. Approximately 350 Fleet Air Arm personnel were stationed aboard the carrier.

Initially, two types of fixed-wing aircraft were operated from Melbourne. de Havilland Sea Venom FAW.53 fighter aircraft were flown by 805 Squadron RAN and 808 Squadron RAN, while Fairey Gannet anti-submarine strike aircraft were operated by 816 Squadron RAN and 817 Squadron RAN. At the time of their arrival, the Sea Venoms were the only radar equipped and all-weather combat aircraft in the Southern Hemisphere. At Melbourne's commissioning, the standard air group consisted of eight Sea Venoms and two squadrons of eight Gannets, with two Bristol Sycamore search-and-rescue helicopters added shortly after the carrier entered service.

These aircraft were due to become obsolete in the late 1950s, and the RAN considered purchasing modern aircraft of French or Italian design, which were better suited to light carrier operations than equivalent British aircraft, or replace Melbourne with a larger carrier. Instead of pursuing either alternative, the Australian government announced in 1959 that Melbourne would be reconfigured during her 1963 refit to operate as a helicopter carrier. The fixed-wing aircraft of the Fleet Air Arm were marked for replacement by 27 Westland Wessex anti-submarine helicopters. A reduction of embarked plane numbers to four Sea Venoms and six Gannets, along with regular rotation and careful use of the aircraft, extended their service life until the mid-1960s, while the size of the air group was maintained by carrying up to ten Wessex helicopters. The decision to retire the fixed-wing component of the Fleet Air Arm was rescinded in 1963, and on 10 November 1964, a AU£212 million increase in defence spending included the purchase of new aircraft for Melbourne.

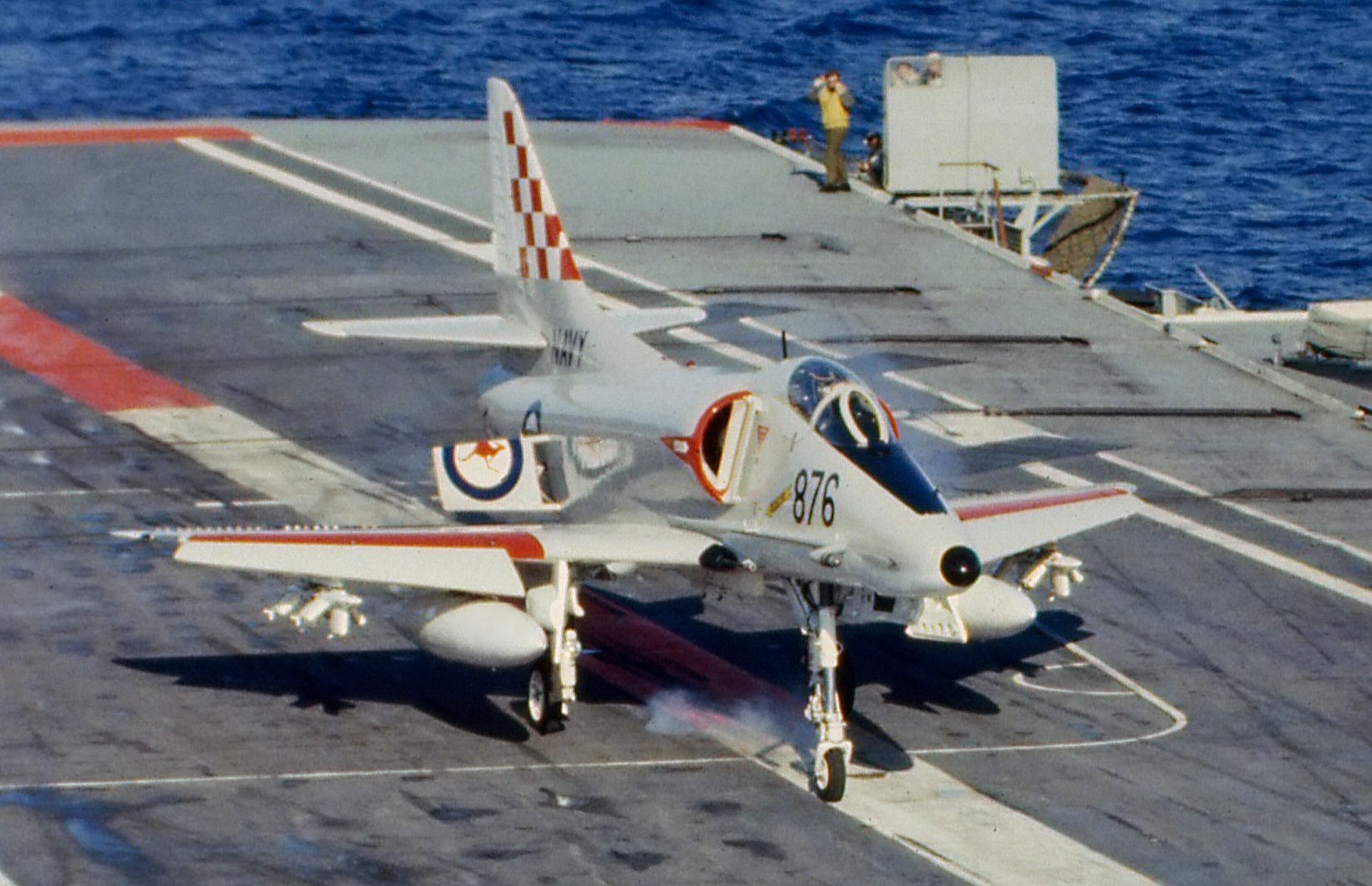
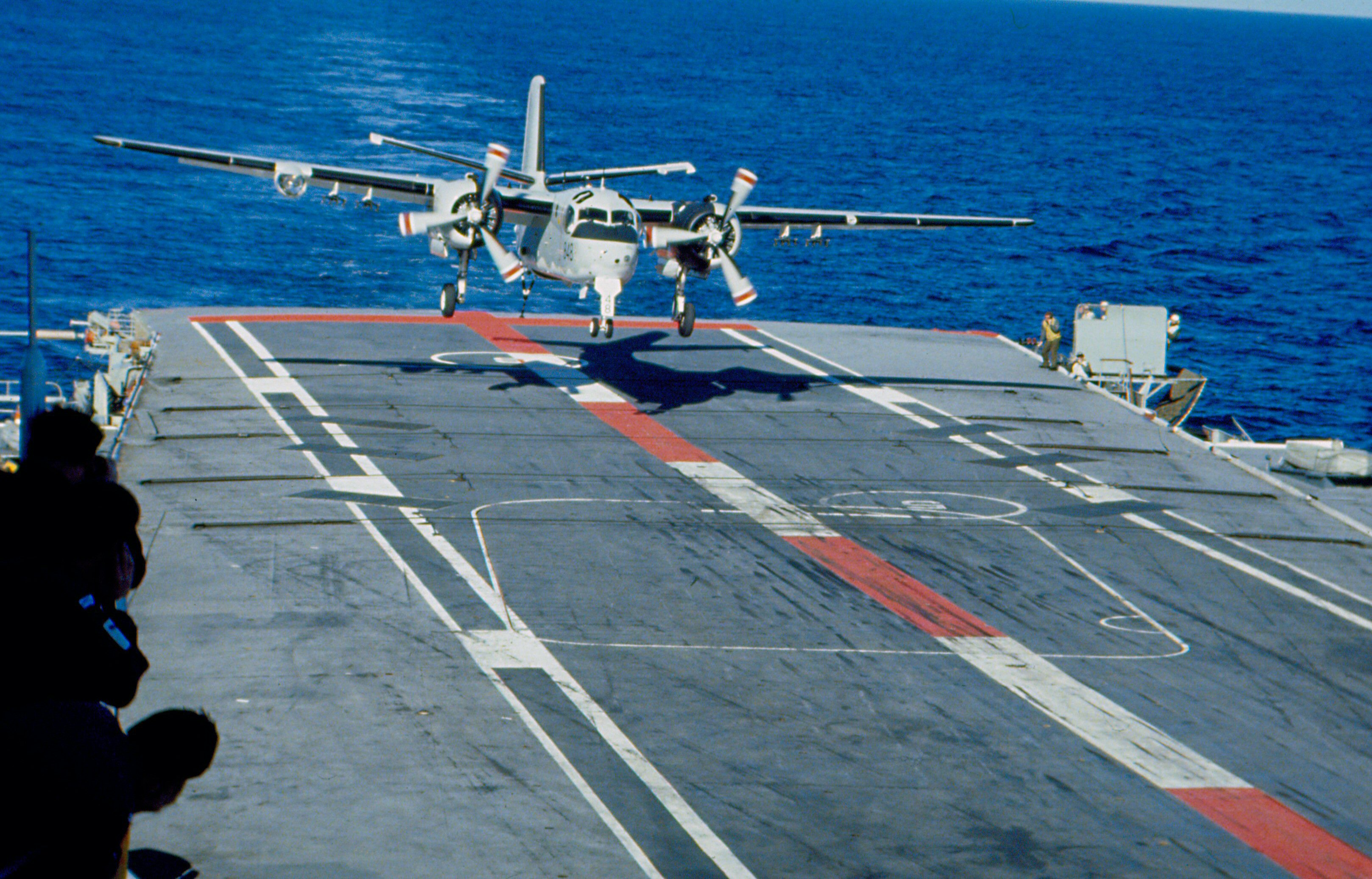
Melbourne's 1968 refit permitted her to operate the A-4 Skyhawk (top) and S-2 Tracker

The RAN planned to acquire 14 Grumman S-2E Tracker anti-submarine aircraft, and modernise Melbourne to operate the aircraft. The acquisition of 18 Douglas A-4 Skyhawk fighter-bombers was also suggested, but these were dropped from the initial plan. A separate proposal to order 10 A-4G Skyhawks, a variant of the Skyhawk designed specifically for the RAN and optimised for air defence, was approved in 1965. Both aircraft types entered RAN service in 1968, with the Trackers operated by 816 Squadron RAN and 851 Squadron RAN, and the Skyhawks by 805 Squadron RAN and 724 Squadron RAN. The aircraft did not fly from Melbourne until the conclusion of her refit in 1969. In 1969, the RAN purchased another ten A-4G Skyhawks, instead of the proposed seventh and eighth Oberon-class submarines. Melbourne operated a standard air group of four Skyhawks, six Trackers, and ten Wessex helicopters until 1972, when the Wessexes were replaced with ten Westland Sea King anti-submarine warfare helicopters and the number of Skyhawks doubled. Although replaced by the Sea King, up to three Wessex helicopters could be carried as search-and-rescue aircraft.

On 5 December 1976, a fire at the Naval Air Station HMAS Albatross destroyed or heavily damaged 12 of the Fleet Air Arm's 13 S-2E Trackers. The carrier was sent to the United States in 1977 to transport back 16 S-2G Tracker aircraft as replacements.

Over the course of her career, over thirty aircraft were either lost or heavily damaged while operating from Melbourne. The majority of the aircraft ditched or crashed over the side, but some losses were due to catapult or arrestor cable failures. After Melbourne was decommissioned, the Fleet Air Arm ceased fixed-wing combat aircraft operation in 1984, with the final Tracker flight saluting the decommissioned carrier.

== Role ==
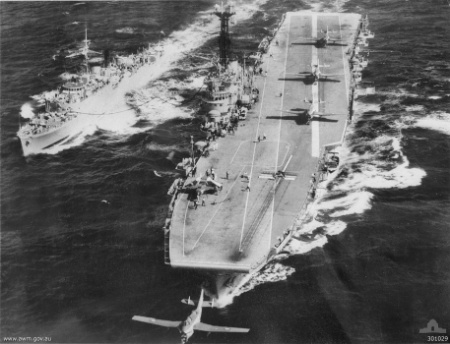
Melbourne refuelling HMAS Quickmatch while conducting flying operations

Melbourne was the third and final conventional aircraft carrier to operate with the RAN. Following the first decommissioning of sister ship HMAS Sydney in 1958, Melbourne became the only aircraft carrier in Australian service. Melbourne was unavailable to provide air cover for the RAN for up to four months in every year; this time was required for refits, refuelling, personnel leave, and non-carrier duties, such as the transportation of troops or aircraft. Although one of the largest ships to serve in the RAN, Melbourne was one of the smallest carriers to operate in the post-World War II period. A decision was made in 1959 to restrict Melbourne's role to helicopter operations only, but was reversed shortly before its planned 1963 implementation.

As well as an operational aircraft carrier, Melbourne was Flagship of the RAN, a role she received almost immediately following her 1956 arrival in Australia, and fulfilled until her decommissioning in 1982. During her service, the carrier was deployed overseas on 35 occasions, visited over 22 countries, and was seen as the physical and psychological centrepiece of the RAN fleet.

As Melbourne was the only ship of her size (both in dimensions and ship's company) in the RAN, the carrier underwent a regular rotation of commanding officers to give them experience. Commanding officers were changed on average every fifteen months, with few remaining on board for more than two years. The majority of Melbourne's commanders later reached flag rank. The carrier was also called on to perform underway replenishments and command and control functions.

== Operational history ==
=== 1955–1964 ===
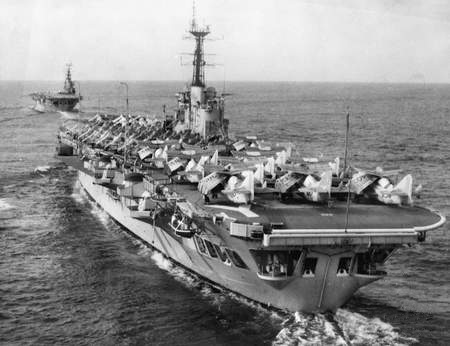
HMA Ships Melbourne (foreground) and Sydney (background) on Melbourne's delivery voyage to Australia. Sea Venoms are stored on the forward section of the carrier's flight deck, while Gannets are on the aft section.

Following a working-up period in British waters, Melbourne departed Glasgow on 11 March 1956 on her maiden voyage to Australia via the Suez Canal. Aboard were the 64 aircraft of RAN squadrons 808, 816, and 817, as well as the racing yacht Samuel Pepys (named after the English naval administrator and diarist), which was a gift to the RAN Sailing Association from the Royal Navy. The ship visited Gibraltar, Naples, Malta, Port Said, Aden, and Colombo, before arriving in Fremantle on 24 April 1956. Melbourne sailed east via the Great Australian Bight, meeting sister ship HMAS Sydney near Kangaroo Island a week later. After visiting Melbourne and Jervis Bay, where the aircraft were offloaded and sent to Naval Air Station HMAS Albatross, the carrier concluded her maiden voyage in Sydney on 10 May. The role of flagship was transferred from Sydney to Melbourne three days later. The carrier immediately underwent a two and a half-month refit, allowing for the inspection of machinery and repair of defects detected during the maiden voyage. Melbourne spent from September to November in Southeast Asian waters, during which she participated in Exercise Albatross and received an official visit by Philippines president Ramon Magsaysay. On return to Australia in mid-November, the carrier visited Melbourne for the 1956 Olympics, where 200 of Melbourne's complement were provided to work as signallers, event marshals, carpenters, and medical workers.

In February 1957, Melbourne was sent to the Royal Hobart Regatta. Following this, she travelled to New Zealand, where she participated in exercises with HMNZS Royalist and visited several New Zealand ports. The first of several annual three-month deployments to Southeast Asia as part of the Far East Strategic Reserve began in April, with Melbourne returning to Darwin at the end of June. The carrier spent the rest of the year visiting Australian ports for open inspections by the public. During the visit to Port Adelaide, on 28 October 1957, Melbourne was slightly damaged when she was struck by MV Straat Lanka—the first of several minor collisions the carrier would experience throughout her career. Operations for the year concluded with participation in Exercise Astrolabe off Lord Howe Island, with ships from the RAN, Royal Navy, and Royal New Zealand Navy, before returning to Sydney on 13 December.

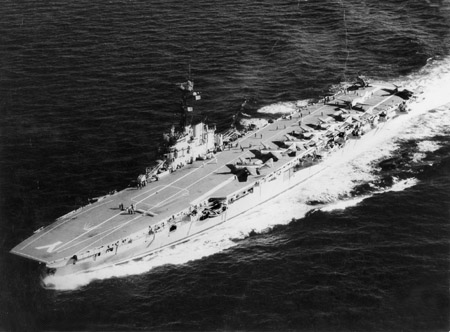
HMAS Melbourne underway in August 1956, with Gannet aircraft on the flight deck

From February until July 1958, Melbourne was deployed on a 25,000-nautical-mile (46,000 km; 29,000 mi) flag-showing cruise. During this cruise the carrier participated in four inter-fleet exercises and visited Singapore, Hong Kong, the Philippines, Japan, Pearl Harbor and Fiji. On return to Sydney, Melbourne entered a short refit, which concluded on 13 October and was immediately followed by a visit to Port Phillip, where the carrier was displayed to Australian Army and Royal Australian Air Force officer cadets before the carrier returned to Sydney. At the start of 1959, Melbourne spent four days in her namesake city, where she was used for the filming of On The Beach, based on Nevil Shute's post-apocalyptic novel of the same name. After filming concluded, the carrier participated in a demonstration exercise off the coast of Sydney before embarking on a Far East Strategic Reserve deployment from March until May. The rest of the year was spent visiting Australian and New Zealand ports.

The following year, 1960, was a bad year for the carrier's air group, with four Sea Venoms and two Gannets damaged in separate incidents aboard Melbourne. All four Sea Venom incidents occurred in March, with three attributed to aircrew error and one to brake failure. The year began with exercises en route to Adelaide, followed by a visit to the Royal Hobart Regatta. The carrier's Strategic Reserve deployment ran from April to June, and was followed by manoeuvres along the east coast of Australia until September. In the lead up to Melbourne's 1961 deployment to the Strategic Reserve, the carrier visited Bombay, Karachi, and Trincomalee. It was the first time a flagship of the RAN had entered Indian waters. Melbourne returned to Australia in June, and on 15 June led several ships in a ceremonial entry to Sydney Harbour to commemorate the 50th anniversary of the RAN. In August, Melbourne was called upon to lead Exercise Tuckerbox, in the Coral Sea. Following the conclusion of Tuckerbox, the carrier visited several New Zealand ports before returning to Sydney for demonstration exercises and public relations activities.

In 1962, Melbourne began the year's activities at the Royal Hobart Regatta, before sailing to her Strategic Reserve deployment, by way of Adelaide and Fremantle. After Strategic Reserve duties were completed, the carrier visited Japan, Guam, and Manus Island before returning to Sydney in late July. In September, Melbourne reprised her role as the leader of Exercise Tuckerbox II. The 10,000th catapult launch from Melbourne occurred in late 1962. The carrier's annual refit began in Sydney on 1 October. At the beginning of 1963, Melbourne again visited to the Royal Hobart Regatta, which was immediately followed by a deployment to the Strategic Reserve, including involvement in SEATO Exercise Sea Serpent. The 20,000th landing on Melbourne was performed in April by a Gannet, and in September, Melbourne participated in Exercise Carbine near Hervey Bay, Queensland.

=== Voyager collision ===
On 10 February 1964, Melbourne was performing trials in Jervis Bay under the command of Captain John Robertson, following the annual refit. The Daring-class destroyer HMAS Voyager was also present, undergoing her own trials following refit, under the command of Captain Duncan Stevens. The trials involved interactions between both ships, and when Melbourne performed night-flying exercises that evening, Voyager acted as the carrier's plane guard escort. This required Voyager to maintain a position 20° off Melbourne's port quarter at a distance from the carrier of 1,500 to 2,000 yards (1,400 to 1,800 m).

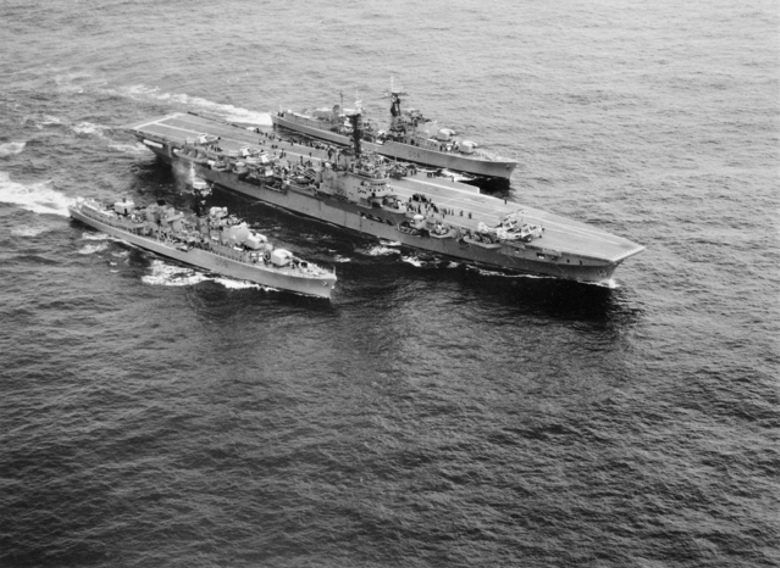
Melbourne underway with Daring-class destroyers Vendetta (left) and Voyager in 1959

Early in the evening, Voyager had no difficulties maintaining her position during the manoeuvres both ships performed. Following a series of turns intended to reverse the courses of both ships beginning at 8:40 pm, Voyager ended up to starboard of Melbourne. At 8:52 pm, Voyager was ordered to resume the plane guard station. The procedure to accomplish this required Voyager to turn away from Melbourne in a large circle, cross behind the carrier, then take position off Melbourne's port side. Instead, Voyager first turned to starboard, away from Melbourne, then turned to port without warning. It was initially assumed by Melbourne's bridge crew that Voyager was conducting a series of tight turns to lose speed before swinging behind Melbourne, but Voyager did not alter course again. At 8:55 pm, with Voyager approaching, Melbourne's navigator ordered the carrier's engines to half astern speed, with Robertson ordering an increase to full astern a few seconds later. At the same time, Stevens, having just become aware of the situation, gave the order "Full ahead both engines. Hard-a starboard.", before instructing the destroyer's Quartermaster to announce that a collision was imminent. Both ships' measures were too late to avoid a collision; Melbourne hit Voyager at 8:56 pm.

Melbourne struck Voyager just aft of the destroyer's bridge, rolling the destroyer to starboard before cutting her in half. Voyager's forward boiler exploded, briefly setting fire to the bow of the carrier before it was extinguished by seawater. The destroyer's forward section sank quickly, under the weight of the two 4.5-inch (110 mm) gun turrets. The aft section did not begin sinking until half an hour after the collision, completely submerging just after midnight. Messages were immediately sent to the Fleet Headquarters in Sydney, although staff in Sydney initially underestimated the extent of the damage to Voyager. Melbourne launched her boats to recover survivors, and the carrier's wardroom and C Hangar were prepared for casualties. At 9:58 pm, Melbourne was informed that search-and-rescue boats from HMAS Creswell, helicopters from HMAS Albatross, and five Ton-class minesweepers had been despatched to assist in the search.

Melbourne en route to Sydney, immediately after the collision. The damage to the bow can be seen.

Melbourne arrived in Sydney with the survivors on 14 February, and after spending time alongside at Garden Island, was moved to Cockatoo Island Dockyard on 25 March, where repairs were undertaken; the damaged section of the bow was cut away and repairs to the ship's internal structure were undertaken in drydock, while a 40-ton prefabricated bow was constructed. Once this was completed, Melbourne was removed while the new bow was put in place in the drydock. The work was completed on 27 April, with the shipyard receiving a commendation.

Of the 314 personnel aboard Voyager at the time of the collision, 14 officers, 67 sailors, and 1 civilian dockyard worker were killed, including Stevens and all but two of the bridge team. A Royal Commission into the events of the collision was held in 1964, and found that while Voyager's crew was primarily at fault for neglecting to maintain an effective lookout and awareness of the larger ship's location, Melbourne's bridge crew was also at fault, for failing to alert Voyager and not taking measures to avoid the collision. Robertson was posted to the training base HMAS Watson—a move that he and the Australian media saw as tantamount to a demotion—but resigned instead. The Royal Commission and its aftermath were poorly handled, and following pressure from the public, media, and politicians, combined with revelations by Voyager's former executive officer that Stevens may have been unfit for command, a second Royal Commission was opened in 1967. This is the only time in Australian history two Royal Commissions have been held for a single incident. The second commission found that Stevens was medically unfit for command and that some of the findings of the first Royal Commission were therefore based on incorrect assumptions. Robertson and the other officers of Melbourne were absolved of blame for the incident.

=== 1964–1969 ===
Melbourne spent ten weeks at Cockatoo Island Dockyard, having her new bow fitted. Following the repairs, Melbourne was involved in Strategic Reserve deployments and exercises in Southeast Asia from June until September 1964. During this deployment, the carrier visited Subic Bay, where the RAN performed flight deck trials with S-2 Tracker anti-submarine aircraft and A-4 Skyhawk attack fighters. The success of the trials, along with the discovery that Melbourne was able to operate both aircraft with relatively minor modification, led the Australian Government to approve the purchase of these aircraft.

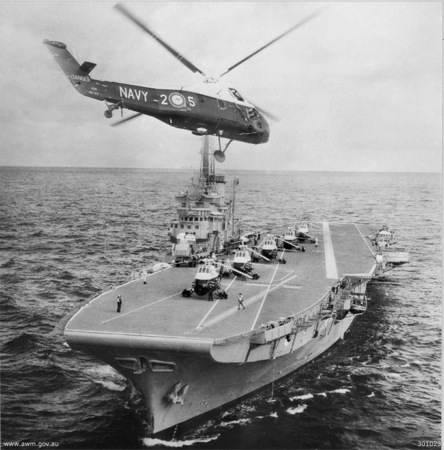
Melbourne with five Wessex helicopters on her flight deck and another flying overheard

From March 1965 until mid-1967, Melbourne underwent a regular pattern of deployments to Southeast Asia, exercises, and flag-showing visits to nations in the Asia-Pacific region. Several of the Southeast Asian deployments were related to the Indonesia–Malaysia confrontation, and involved participation in show of force exercises off the coast of Malaysia. During 1965 and 1966, Melbourne escorted sister ship HMAS Sydney, which had been recommissioned as a troop transport, for short periods during the latter's first, third, and fourth transport voyages to Vietnam. Despite the carrier being the centrepiece of several plans to involve Australian forces in the Vietnam War, the escort runs were the extent of Melbourne's participation in the conflict, and the carrier remained outside the Market Time area while Sydney and her other escorts proceeded to Vũng Tàu. As the carrier was optimised for anti-submarine warfare, there was little need for her at the start of the war. Utilising the carrier was suggested again by RAN officials in March 1966, when the United States Seventh Fleet was having difficulties maintaining anti-submarine patrols around Yankee Station, but Melbourne could only remain on station for a single, ten-day period, a third of the time that US carriers were operational for on rotating deployments. Seventh Fleet staff suggested in April 1967 that Melbourne deploy in the anti-submarine role, but nothing came of these talks. Consideration was also given to using Melbourne as a floating helicopter base, but only ten Wessex helicopters could be provided, and modifications were required for them to operate as troop carriers. Both options were made more prohibitive by the need to supply at least two escorts for the carrier at a time when the RAN was having difficulty meeting deployment commitments with the available destroyers and destroyer escorts.

In September 1967, Melbourne travelled to the United States to collect new aircraft: 14 Trackers and 10 Skyhawks. To operate the new aircraft, the carrier received a major refit on her return to Sydney, which began in December 1967. In May 1967, it was proposed that while Melbourne was out of service, A-4 Skyhawk pilots and maintenance personnel could be attached to a United States Marine Corps Skyhawk squadron in South Vietnam. Australian aircraft were not to be provided, as the A-4G Skyhawks used by the RAN were optimised for air defence, not the fighter-bomber role performed by the Marines, and would have suffered heavy losses from North Vietnam's heavy anti-aircraft defences. This deployment did not occur; the Skyhawk pilot training program was experiencing delays because US squadrons were being shipped training equipment and replacement parts in priority to the RAN, and sending qualified pilots overseas would have caused further holdups with the program, while also disrupting Melbourne's post-refit reactivation. Melbourne re-entered service at the conclusion of the refit on 14 February 1969. She performed sea trials in Jervis Bay from 17 February until 5 May, then sailed for Subic Bay, Philippines, to participate in SEATO Exercise Sea Spirit.

=== Frank E. Evans collision ===
Melbourne's commanding officer during the SEATO exercise was Captain John Phillip Stevenson. Rear Admiral John Crabb, the Flag Officer Commanding Australian Fleet, was also embarked on the carrier. During Sea Spirit, Melbourne was assigned five escorts: US Ships Everett F. Larson, Frank E. Evans, and James E. Kyes, HMNZS Blackpool, and HMS Cleopatra. Stevenson held a dinner for the five escort captains at the start of the exercise, during which he recounted the events of the Melbourne–Voyager collision, emphasised the need for caution when operating near the carrier, and provided written instructions on how to avoid such a situation developing again. Additionally, during the lead up to the exercise, Admiral Crabb had strongly warned that all repositioning manoeuvres performed by the escorts had to commence with a turn away from Melbourne. Despite these warnings, a near-miss occurred in the early hours of 31 May when Larson turned towards the carrier after being ordered to the plane guard station. Subsequent action narrowly prevented a collision. The escorts were again warned about the dangers of operating near the carrier and informed of Stevenson's expectations, while the minimum distance between carrier and escorts was increased from 2,000 to 3,000 yards (1,800 to 2,700 m).

The paths taken by Melbourne and USS Frank E. Evans in the minutes leading up to the collision

On the night of 2–3 June 1969, Melbourne and her escorts were involved in anti-submarine training exercises in the South China Sea. In preparation for launching a Tracker, Stevenson ordered Evans to the plane guard station, reminded the destroyer of Melbourne's course, and instructed the carrier's navigational lights to be brought to full brilliance. Evans had performed the manoeuvre four times over the course of the night. Evans was positioned on Melbourne's port bow, but began the manoeuvre by turning starboard, towards the carrier. A radio message was sent from Melbourne to Evans' bridge and Combat Information Centre, warning the destroyer that she was on a collision course, which Evans acknowledged. Seeing the destroyer take no action and on a course to place herself under Melbourne's bow, Stevenson ordered the carrier hard to port, signalling the turn by both radio and siren blasts. At approximately the same time, Evans turned hard to starboard to avoid the approaching carrier. It is uncertain which ship began to manoeuvre first, but each ship's bridge crew claimed that they were informed of the other ship's turn after they commenced their own. After having narrowly passed in front of Melbourne, the turns quickly placed Evans back in the carrier's path. Melbourne hit Evans amidships at 3:15 am, cutting the destroyer in two.

Seventy-four of the 273 personnel from Evans were killed in the collision, with the majority of these believed to have been asleep or trapped inside the bow section, which sank within minutes. Melbourne deployed her boats, life rafts, and lifebuoys, before carefully manoeuvring alongside the stern section of Evans, where both ships' crews used mooring lines to lash the ships together. Sailors from Melbourne dived from the flight deck into the water to rescue overboard survivors close to the carrier, while the carrier's boats and helicopters collected those farther out. All of the survivors were located within 12 minutes of the collision and rescued before half an hour had passed, although the search continued for fifteen more hours. After Evans' stern was evacuated, it was cast off, while the carrier moved away to avoid damage. The stern did not sink, and was later recovered, stripped of parts, and sunk for target practice.

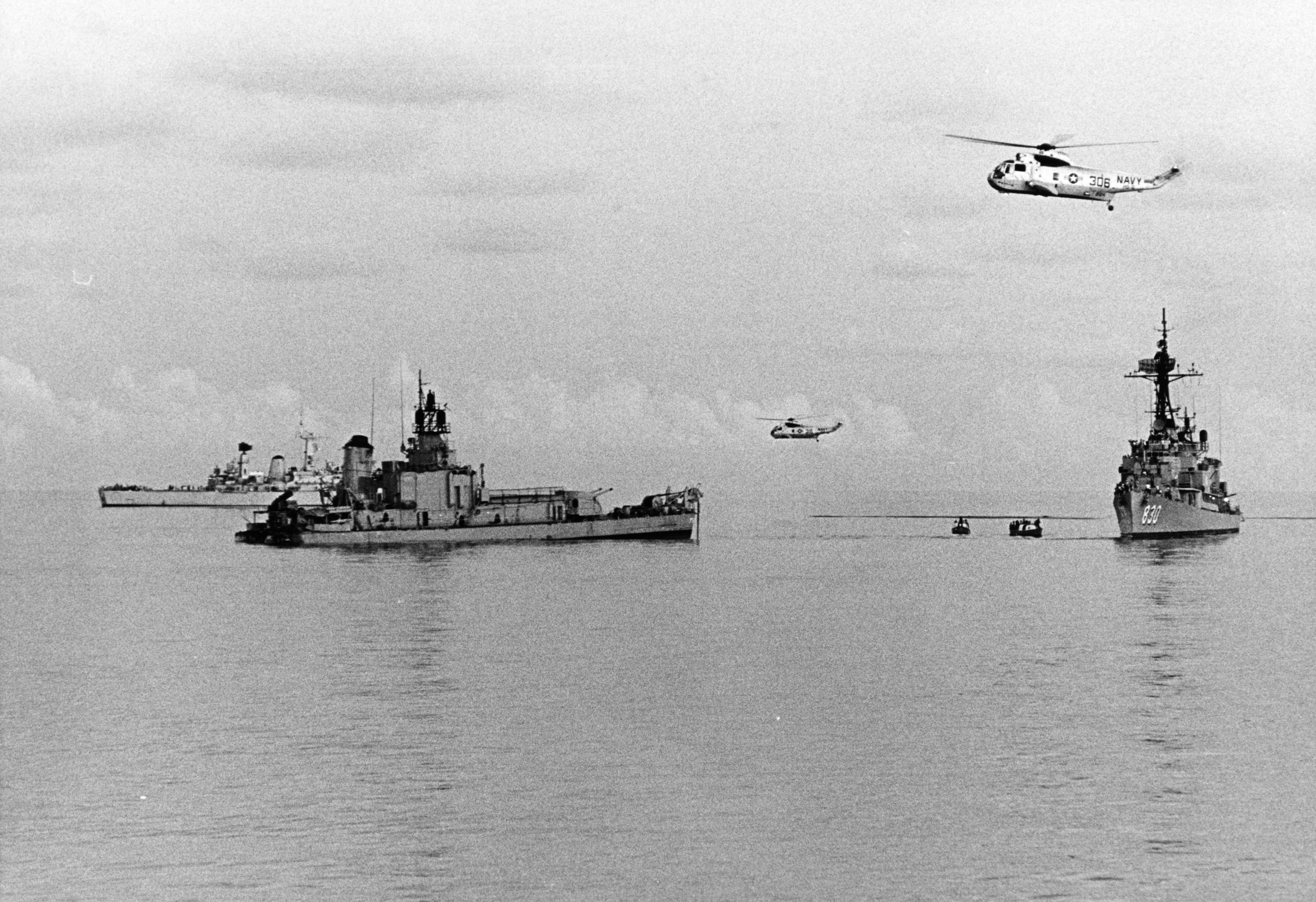
The stern section of USS Frank E. Evans on the morning after the collision. USS Everett F. Larson (right) is moving in to salvage the remains of the abandoned destroyer.

Following the collision, Melbourne travelled to Singapore for temporary repairs to her bow, arriving on 6 June. Melbourne departed Singapore on 27 June and arrived in Sydney on 9 July, where the carrier underwent almost identical repairs at Cockatoo Island Dockyard as in 1964 (primarily the installation of a new bow section). However, an industrial dispute amongst the shipyard workers meant that, although the work was completed in early September, the ship remained in the drydock until 11 October.

A Joint RAN-USN board of inquiry was established to investigate the incident, and was in session over June and July 1969. The board found Evans partially at fault for the collision, but also faulted Melbourne for not taking evasive action sooner, even though international sea regulations dictated that in the lead-up to a collision, the larger ship was required to maintain course and speed. It was learned during the inquiry that Evans' commanding officer was asleep in his quarters at the time of the incident, and charge of the vessel was held by Lieutenants Ronald Ramsey and James Hopson; the former had failed the qualification exam to stand watch, while the latter was at sea for the first time. Subsequent to the inquiry, the three USN officers and Stevenson were court-martialled by their respective navies on charges of negligence, with the three USN officers found guilty and Stevenson 'Honourably Acquitted'. Despite the findings, Stevenson's next posting was as a minor flag officer's chief of staff, seen by him as a demotion in all but name. In a repetition of the aftermath of the Voyager collision, Melbourne's captain resigned amid accusations of scapegoating. In December 2012, Stevenson announced that he had received a letter from the Minister for Defence, apologising for his treatment by the RAN and the government of the day.

=== 1970–1976 ===
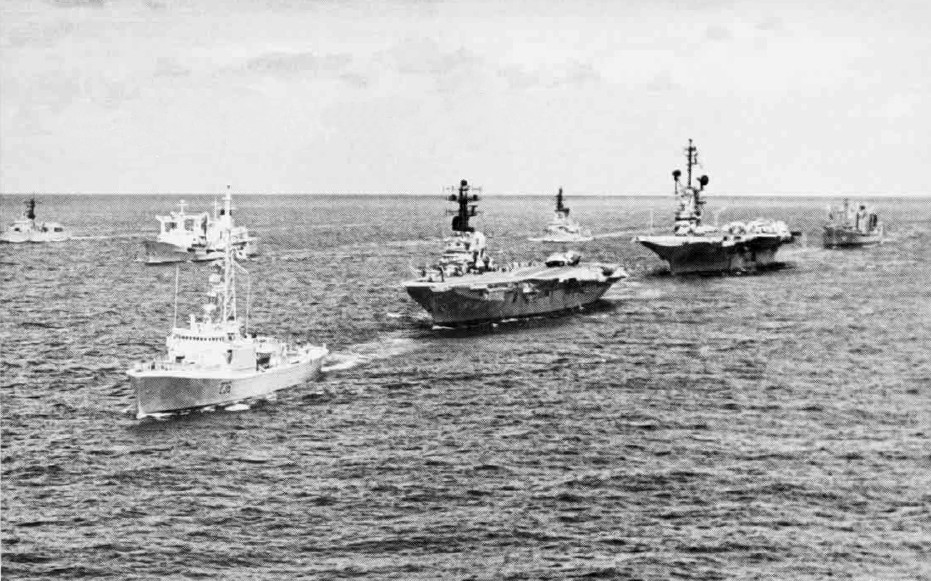
Warships underway near Hawaii during the RIMPAC 72 exercise. Identifiable ships are the Canadian destroyer HMCS Gatineau, followed by Melbourne and the United States aircraft carrier USS Ticonderoga.

During the 1970s and early 1980s, replacing parts became an increasing problem. Components were failing due to wear and age, but the companies responsible for manufacturing the parts had gone out of business during the previous twenty years, sometimes immediately after World War II ended. The carrier's engineers often resorted to making replacements from scratch. The ship's catapult was replaced with parts from the decommissioned HMCS Bonaventure in 1970.

In 1970, Melbourne participated in three major inter-navy exercises: Sea Rover with SEATO forces in the South China Sea, Bersatu Padu with British Commonwealth forces off Malaysia, and Swan Lake with the Royal Navy and Royal New Zealand Navy off Western Australia. During this year, the carrier also visited Japan to participate in Expo '70, and was hit by Manly ferry South Steyne while alongside at Garden Island, causing minor damage to both vessels. Melbourne was out of service for most of 1971 while she underwent refits, which concluded in early August. In mid-1971, the Australian military's Joint Planning Committee considered using Melbourne as a transport to help complete the withdrawal of the Australian Task Force from Vietnam before the end of 1971. While the Army supported this proposal, the Navy successfully argued against its implementation, claiming that transporting troops and cargo would be misusing Australia's only active aircraft carrier, and would prevent Melbourne from participating in several major multi-national exercises. The refit concluded in late 1971, with the carrier participating in the first RIMPAC exercise, RIMPAC 71, before the end of the year.

Operations in 1972 commenced with a three-month deployment to Southeast Asia. During this deployment, Melbourne led a fleet of 17 ships from the RAN, Royal Navy, Royal New Zealand Navy, US Navy, Philippine Navy, and Royal Thai Navy in Exercise Sea Hawk. This was followed by goodwill visits to numerous Southeast Asian ports, including Hong Kong, Jakarta, Manila, Singapore, and Surabaya, before Melbourne returned to Sydney at the end of April. The carrier spent May performing exercises off the New South Wales coast, during which she was called on to rescue three fisherman who had been stranded at sea for the previous two days. In August, Melbourne sailed for Hawaii to participate in RIMPAC 72. At the conclusion of this exercise, Melbourne proceeded to Japan on a diplomatic visit, then sailed to the Philippines to exercise with SEATO ships. During this deployment, a fire ignited inside the ship's main switchboard. The carrier returned to Australia on 27 November after 101 days at sea, and underwent a seven-month refit. On 24 August 1973, Melbourne returned to Hawaii to participate in RIMPAC 73. She returned to Australia on 12 October, but sailed out ten days later to participate in Exercise Leadline off Malaysia, before reaching Sydney again in December.

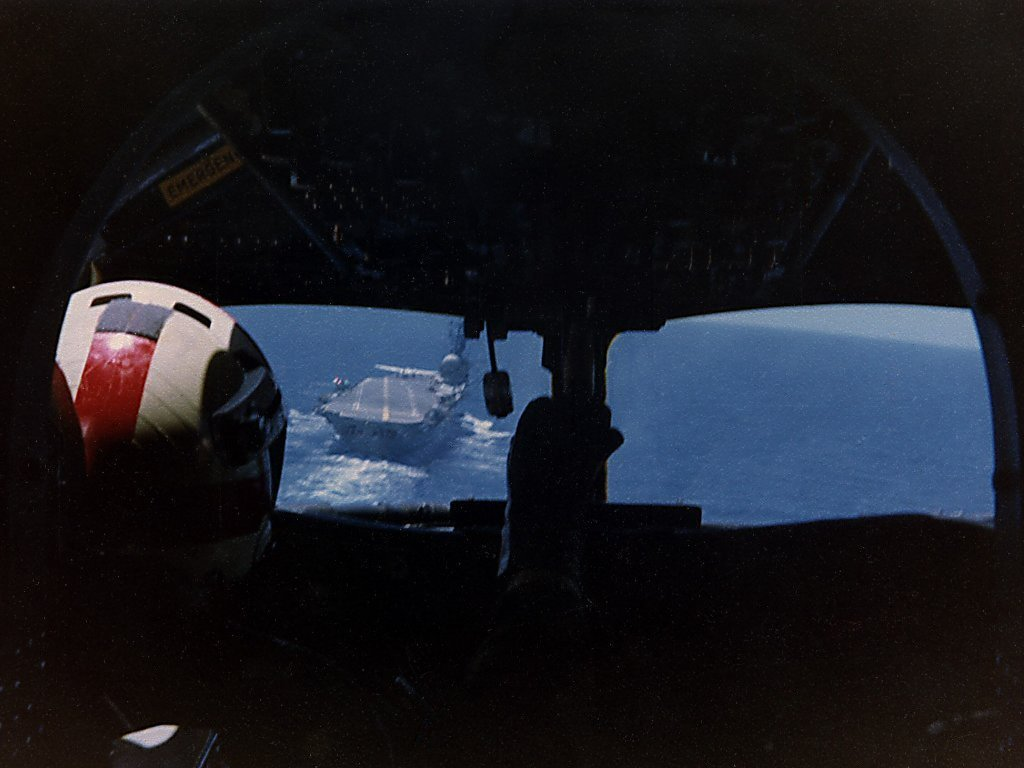
Melbourne as seen from the cockpit of an approaching Grumman S-2G Tracker

Melbourne began 1974 by transporting 120 Australian soldiers to a temporary assignment with an American infantry battalion based in Hawaii. She then sailed to San Francisco to collect 12 new Chinook and five UH-1 Iroquois helicopters for the Royal Australian Air Force, arriving in Australia with her cargo in April. In June, the carrier took part in Exercise Kangaroo in the Coral Sea, before returning to Sydney in July. On 11 July, the passenger liner SS Australis hit and damaged Melbourne in Sydney Harbour. In November, the carrier took part in disaster relief exercises. These were prophetic, as on the night of 24–25 December 1974, Cyclone Tracy destroyed the city of Darwin. Melbourne's ship's company was recalled immediately from leave, the ship was loaded with supplies, and the carrier departed Sydney on 26 December in the company of HMAS Brisbane. Melbourne, Brisbane, and eleven other ships were deployed as part of the largest peacetime rescue effort ever organised by the RAN: Operation Navy Help Darwin. Melbourne remained off Darwin until 18 January 1975, acting as operational headquarters and a helicopter base. During this operation, the seven Wessex helicopters embarked on Melbourne performed 2,493 flights, carrying 7,824 passengers and 107 tons of cargo.

Following Navy Help Darwin, Melbourne participated in RIMPAC 75, then returned to Sydney for a fourteen-month refit, which was delayed by industrial action at the dockyard. While moored in Sydney Harbour, on 24 July, Melbourne was struck by Japanese cargo ship Blue Andromeda. While working up following the refit, Melbourne and HMAS Torrens provided assistance to MV Miss Chief off the coast of Bundaberg, Queensland on 16 August 1976. In October, Melbourne participated in Exercise Kangaroo II, before sailing to her namesake city for the carrier's 21st birthday celebrations, then returning to Sydney on 5 November.

=== 1976–1983 ===
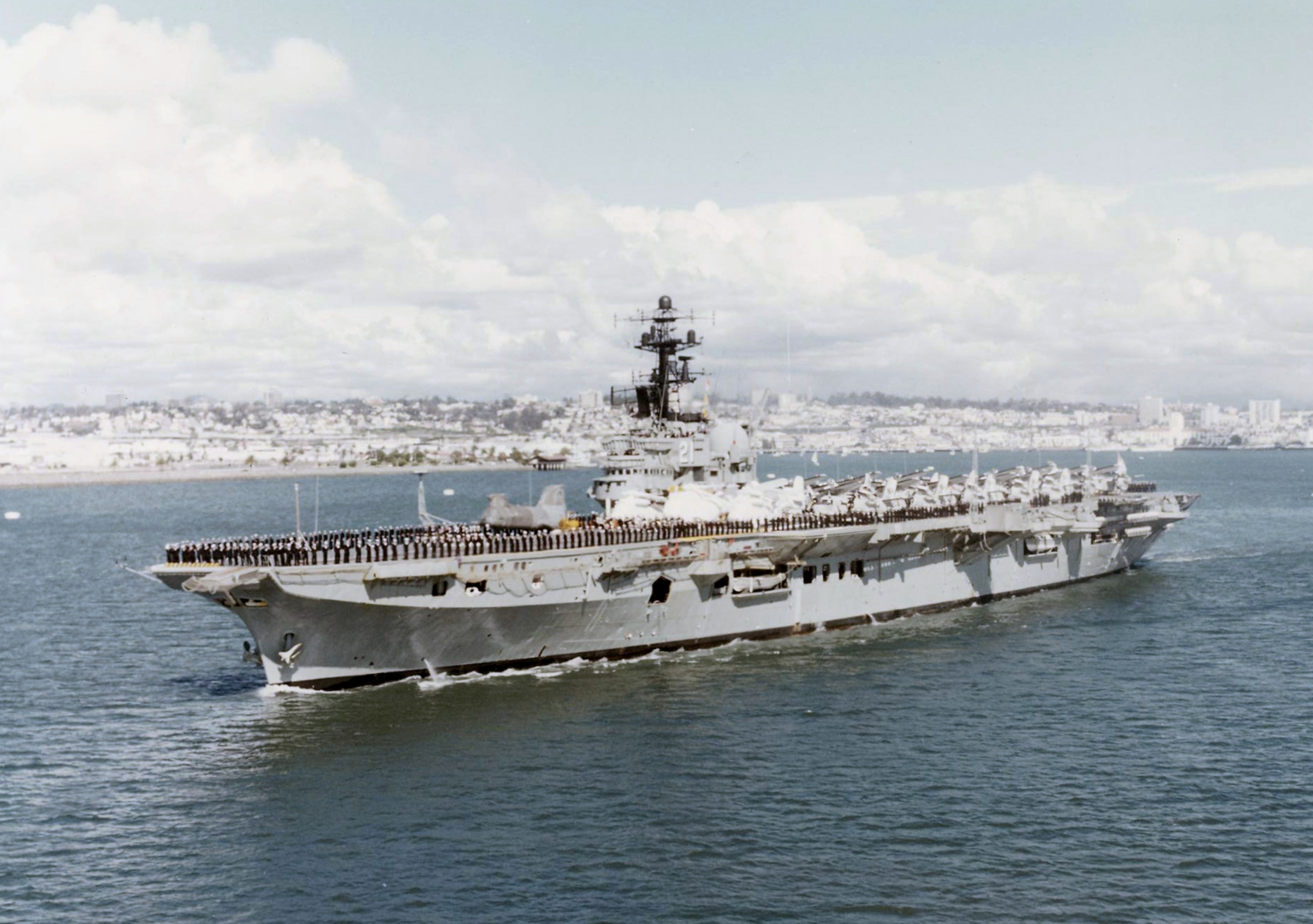
Melbourne departing San Diego in 1977 after collecting the RAN's replacement S-2 Trackers.

On 5 December 1976, a fire deliberately lit at HMAS Albatross by a member of the Fleet Air Arm damaged or destroyed all but one of Australia's S-2 Trackers. Following participation in RIMPAC 77, Melbourne was sent to San Diego to collect replacement aircraft. Arriving back in Sydney on 5 April, the carrier was sent on a five-month deployment to the United Kingdom on 28 April, accompanied by HMAS Brisbane and HMNZS Canterbury. En route, Melbourne lost a Sea King in the Indian Ocean on 9 May, with the aircrew recovered by Brisbane. A Tracker from Melbourne located the disabled Dutch vessel Impala Princess in the Gulf of Aden on 25 May and directed a French destroyer to assist. Two Bofors naval guns were deposited by Melbourne at Souda Bay, Crete on 2 June, marking the first visit of an Australian warship to Crete since June 1941. These weapons were donated to the Australian War Memorial at Stavromenos, in Crete's Rethymno regional unit. The highlight of the deployment saw the three ships represent Australia and New Zealand at the Silver Jubilee Naval Review on 28 June 1977. A two-seat Harrier jump jet demonstrator undertook a series of trial takeoffs and landings aboard Melbourne on 30 June: a trial organised as part of the project overseeing the ship's potential replacement. Following the Jubilee Review and participation in Exercise Highwood in July, Melbourne and her escorts returned to Australia, arriving in Fremantle on 19 September and Sydney on 4 October. Melbourne was docked in Garden Island's drydock on arrival, where she remained until January 1978.

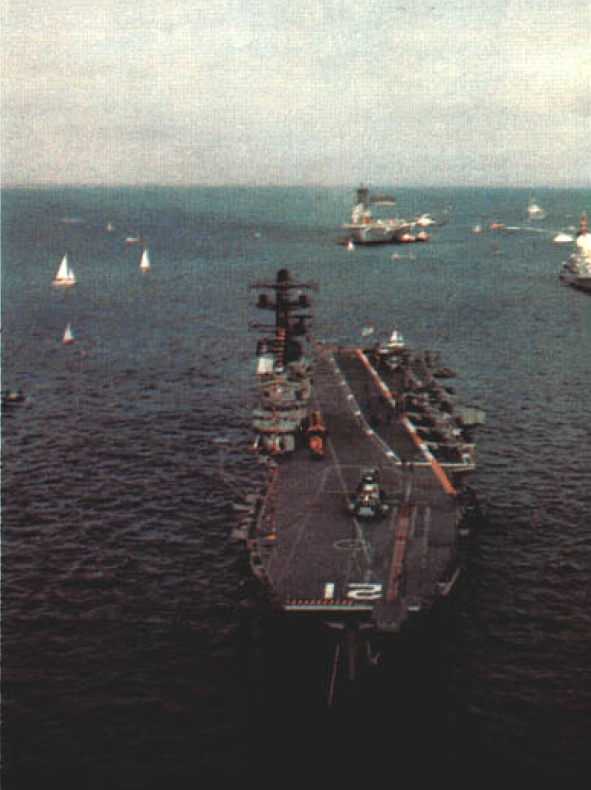
Melbourne at Spithead for the Jubilee Naval Review

At the end of March 1978, Melbourne left Sydney for RIMPAC 78. During this exercise, Melbourne acquired the nickname 'Little M' after working with 'Big E' USS Enterprise—the smallest and largest aircraft carriers (respectively) in operation at the time. On return in July, the carrier entered a major refit, which continued until 3 August 1979. During this refit, on 3 March, a boiler explosion caused minor damage to the carrier. The remainder of the year involved participation in three exercises, Tasmanex off Wellington, New Zealand, Sea Eagle I in the Tasman Sea, and Kangaroo III in the Coral Sea. During Tasmanex, Melbourne lost her LW-02 radar aerial and a Skyhawk (N13-154907), both of which fell overboard during heavy seas.

During February and March 1980, Melbourne participated in RIMPAC 80, as the flagship of Battle Group Two. This was immediately followed by a visit to the Solomon Islands in early April. The carrier was in Sydney from mid-April until mid-August, during which the 25th anniversary of Melbourne's service in the RAN was celebrated on 15 August with a cocktail party aboard the carrier, popularly referred to as 'The Night of the Admirals'. On 18 August, Melbourne sailed for Fremantle to participate in Exercise Sandgroper 80. On 8 September, Melbourne, accompanied by Perth, Derwent, Stalwart, Supply, and Otama deployed to the Indian Ocean as the Australian Squadron for a flag-showing cruise. During this cruise two Skyhawks were lost: on 2 and 21 October. On 24 October, a Tracker from Melbourne observed Soviet warships Storozhevoy and Ivan Rogov shadowing the squadron. The squadron's return in November 1980 concluded the largest and longest RAN deployment since World War II.

Following her return, the carrier spent six months in Australian waters, before a two-month deployment to Southeast Asia. During this deployment, on 21 June 1981, Melbourne rescued 99 Vietnamese refugees from a disabled fishing vessel in the South China Sea. The carrier's deployments for the second half of the year consisted of two exercises, Sea Hawk and Kangaroo 81. A major refit scheduled to begin in late 1981 was postponed pending the decision on a replacement carrier. After docking at Garden Island in December, the carrier was accidentally flooded by an officer who was impatient to commence leave. In his haste to shut down the carrier, he failed to deactivate the water pumps, and over 180 tons of fresh water were pumped in before a maintenance party discovered the flooding the next day. Melbourne remained in dock at the start of 1982, and did not leave before the decision regarding her replacement was made.

== Replacement ==
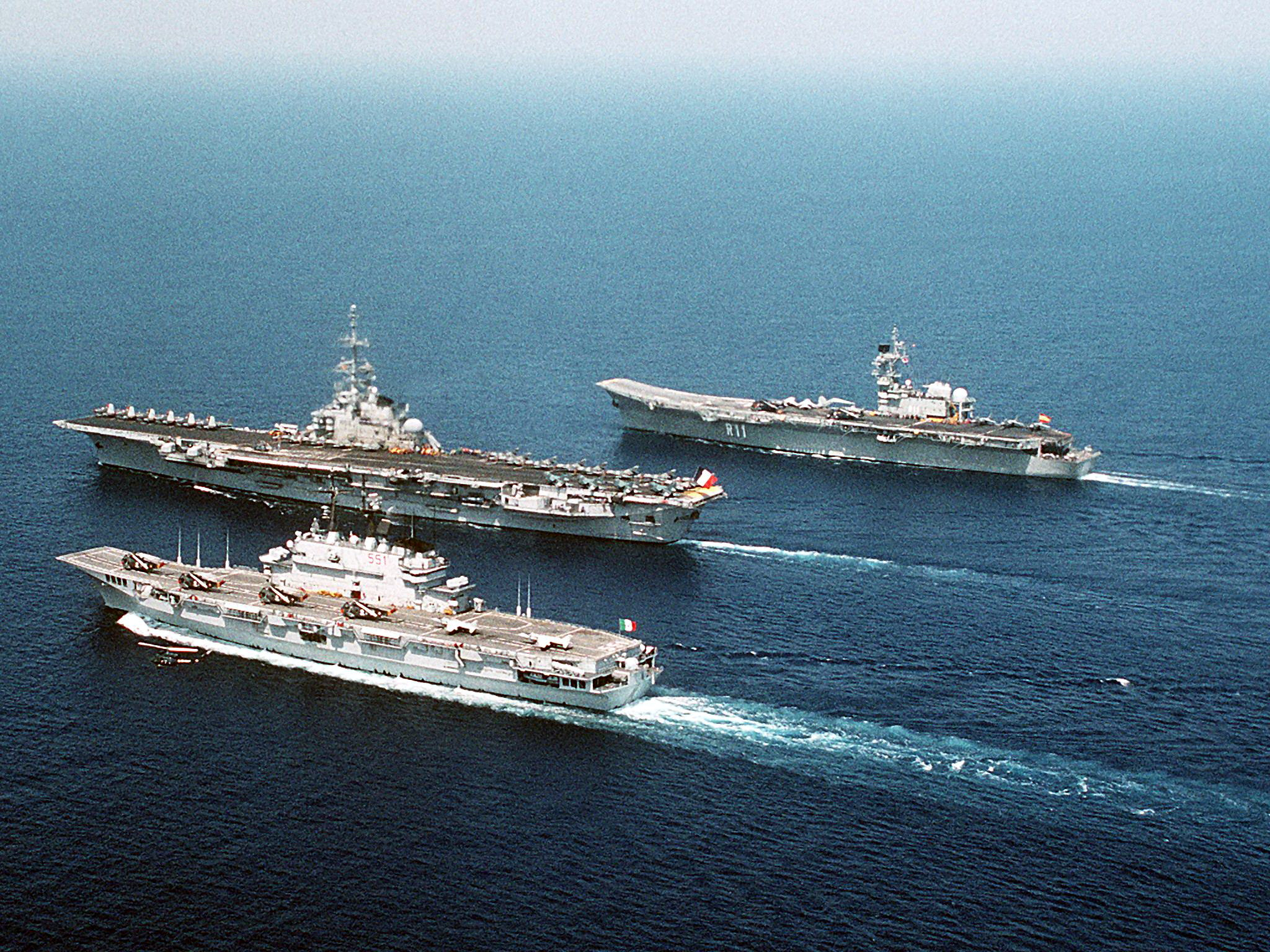
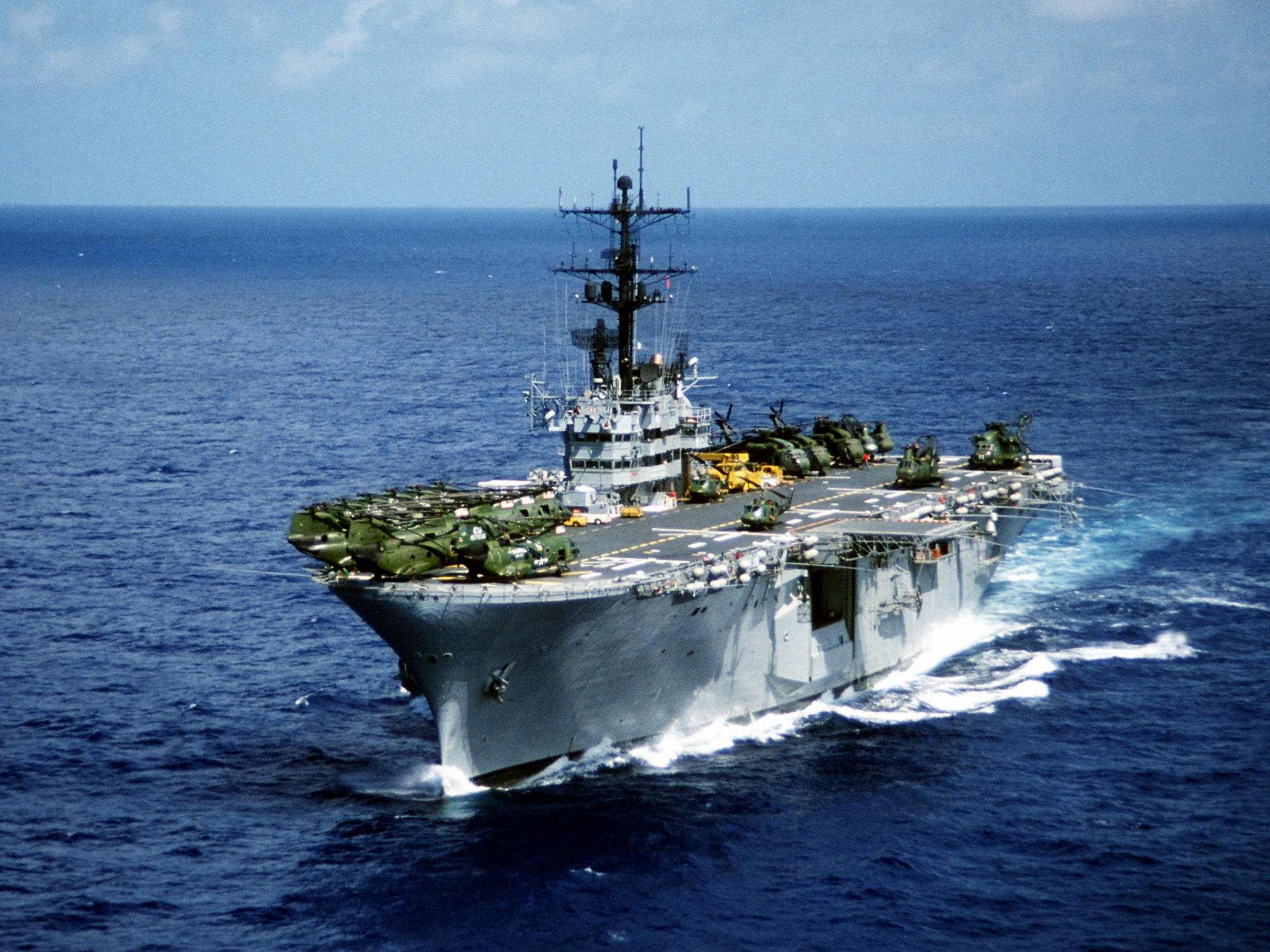
During the late 1970s, the project to replace Melbourne was choosing between Italian (Giuseppe Garibaldi, left image foreground), Spanish (Príncipe de Asturias, left image background), and American (Iwo Jima-class, right image) designs.

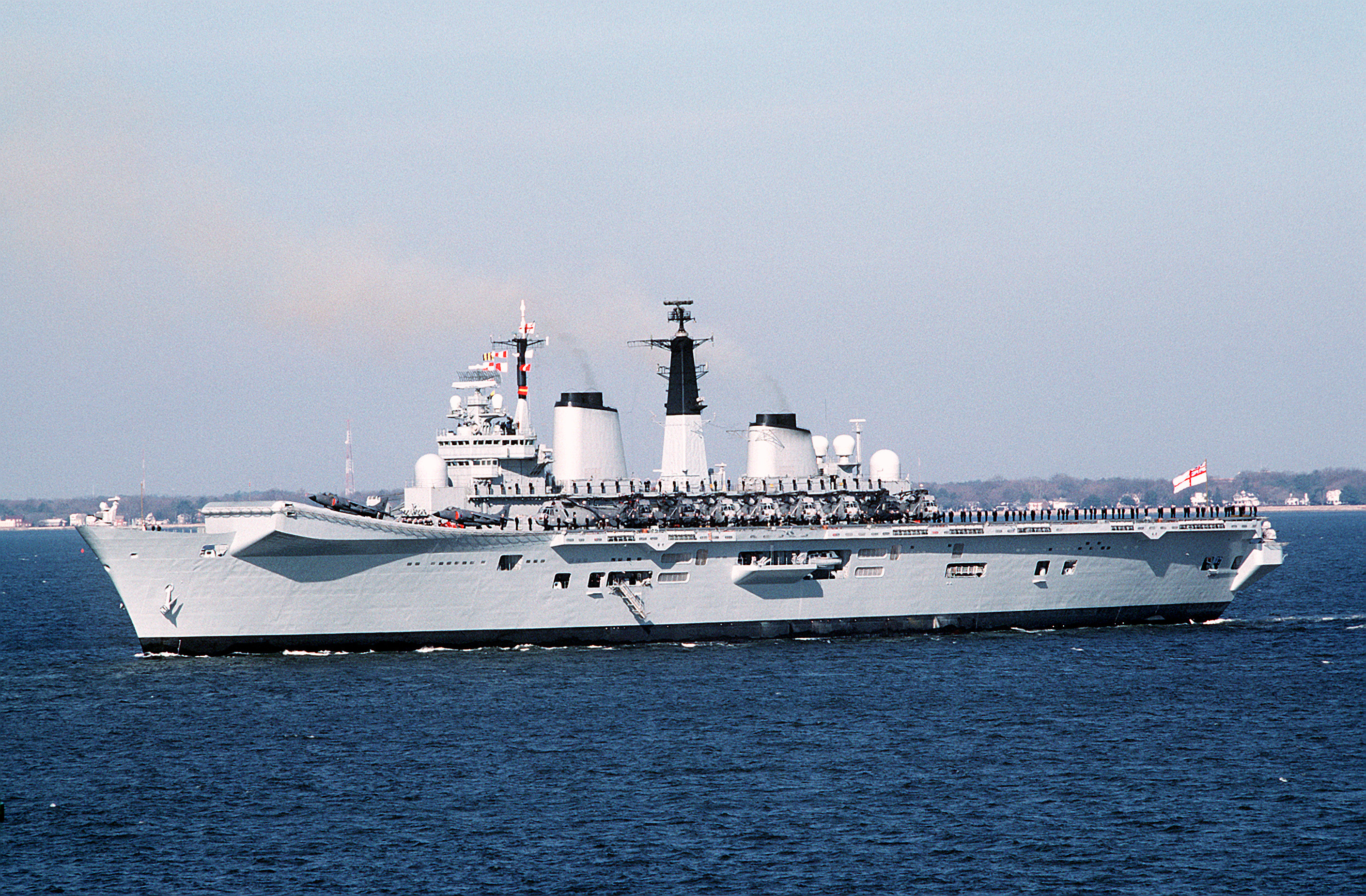
An agreement was reached for Australia to purchase HMS Invincible, with delivery planned for 1983, until the Falklands War led to the deal being terminated.

A replacement for Melbourne was under consideration as early as 1956, and the question was revisited on several occasions until the 1980s. In every situation, a new aircraft carrier was turned down due to the increases in manpower and operating costs required to operate the ship when compared to Melbourne.

Between 1956 and 1959, the RAN considered acquiring a larger carrier to replace Melbourne, as the Fleet Air Arm was becoming obsolete and the RAN did not believe the ship could be modified to operate newer, heavier aircraft. Under consideration were British carrier HMS Albion and a ship of the United States' Essex class. Both options were turned down, and it was instead proposed to operate Melbourne as a helicopter carrier.

In 1960, the United States Navy offered an Essex-class carrier to the Australian government, in the interest of improving relations between the two nations and their navies. The only cost to the RAN would have been the modifications required to make the carrier operationally compatible with the RAN's primarily British-designed fleet. In the late 1960s, the British made a similar offer, following a 1966 review indicating that HMS Hermes was a superfluous naval unit. In 1968, Hermes took part in a combined exercise with the RAN, during which the carrier was visited by RAN and Australian government officials, while RAN Skyhawks and Trackers practised landings on the larger carrier. Both offers were turned down due to operating and manpower costs.

The need to secure a replacement for Melbourne grew as the carrier's age caused the operating costs to increase to over A$25 million per year. In June 1977, the Defence Force Development Committee approved an investigation into acquiring a STOVL/helicopter carrier. By August 1979, the decision was limited to three ships: a modified American Iwo Jima-class amphibious assault ship, an Italian Giuseppe Garibaldi-class carrier, and a Sea Control Ship design that later became the Spanish Navy's Principe de Asturias. By February 1981, the Iwo Jima class was the preferred option.

=== HMS Invincible ===
Plans to replace Melbourne changed in July 1981; the British 1981 Defence White Paper had marked the recently commissioned HMS Invincible as surplus to requirements, and she was offered to the RAN for the 'bargain' price of GB£175 million (A$285 million). The Invincible class had been considered and discarded during the investigation, but the decreased price and the fact the already-constructed carrier would be ready for RAN service in 1983 prompted the Australian government to announce its intention to purchase Invincible on 25 February 1982 and close the carrier acquisition program. The government also announced that the ship would be renamed HMAS Australia and operated as a helicopter carrier, and that a decision on the purchase of fixed wing aircraft would be made after acquisition.

The deal was put on hold in April 1982, following the outbreak of the Falklands War. The performance of Invincible and other Royal Navy aircraft carriers during the conflict showed that the report which suggested reductions in the size of Britain's carrier fleet—with the follow-on effect of making Invincible available for sale—was flawed, and both sides withdrew from the deal in July. The RAN was again offered HMS Hermes, and again declined due to the carrier's age and manpower requirements. The Australian government began to reconsider the previous contenders for replacement, as well as considering requesting the United Kingdom or United States to build a simple carrier capable of operating F/A-18 Hornet strike fighters, but the issue was suspended at the commencement of the 1983 Australian Federal Election. On 14 March, following the election of Bob Hawke's Labor Government, the announcement was made that Melbourne would not be replaced.

== Decommissioning and fate ==
Following the decision to replace Melbourne with HMS Invincible, the postponed refit was cancelled outright. The Australian carrier was prepared for disposal, and was decommissioned and placed in reserve on 30 June 1982. She was towed to the mooring dolphins near Bradley's Head, where she remained until 1985. Melbourne was capable of being reactivated as a helicopter-equipped anti-submarine warfare carrier within 26 weeks, but was never required to do so. A Sydney-based group proposed in 1984 to purchase Melbourne and operate her as a floating casino moored in international waters off Eden, New South Wales, but nothing came of this. Melbourne's air wing was disbanded at HMAS Albatross on 2 July 1982, with the transfer of 805 Squadron's Skyhawks to 724 Squadron and 816 Squadron being absorbed into 851 Squadron. The Skyhawks remained in service as fleet support aircraft until 30 June 1984, while the Trackers were withdrawn from service on 31 August 1984 after being used as land-based maritime patrol aircraft.

The carrier was initially sold for breaking up as scrap metal for A$1.7 million, although the sale fell through in June 1984. (Note: Sources are inconsistent regarding who attempted to purchase Melbourne in the first sale. Lind claims the sale was to South Korea, Cassells states it was to Taiwan, and that the sale fell through when they failed to commit to scrapping the carrier, and the Sea Power Centre indicates an Australian company was the buyer.) She was sold again in February 1985 to the China United Shipbuilding Company for A$1.4 million, with the intention that she be towed to China and broken up for scrap. Prior to the ship's departure for China, the RAN stripped Melbourne of all electronic equipment and weapons, and welded her rudders into a fixed position so that she could not be reactivated. Her steam catapult, arresting gear and optical landing system were not removed. At this time, few western experts expected that the Chinese government would attempt to develop aircraft carriers in the future. The carrier departed Sydney on 27 April 1985, heading for Guangzhou, under the tow of tug De Ping. The journey was delayed when the towing line began to part, requiring the carrier and tug to shelter in Queensland's Moreton Bay, on 30 April. The towing gear broke a day later, requiring a second tug to secure the carrier while repairs were made to De Ping. Three days later, Melbourne ran aground while still in Moreton Bay. Melbourne arrived in China on 13 June. The Australian government received a Telex on this day, reading: (Note: The text of the telex message has been altered for readability. The original message reads: Pls b advised that HMAS Melbourne arrived at Port Huangpu, intact n safely afloat, proud n majestic. She has bn innocent, never once bowed to the natural or human force, in spite of the heavy storm n the talked abt jinx.)

Please be advised that HMAS Melbourne arrived at Port Huangpu, intact and safely afloat, proud and majestic. She has been innocent, never once bowed to the natural or human force, in spite of the heavy storm and the talked about jinx.

— Telex communication to the Australian Government, 13 June 1985

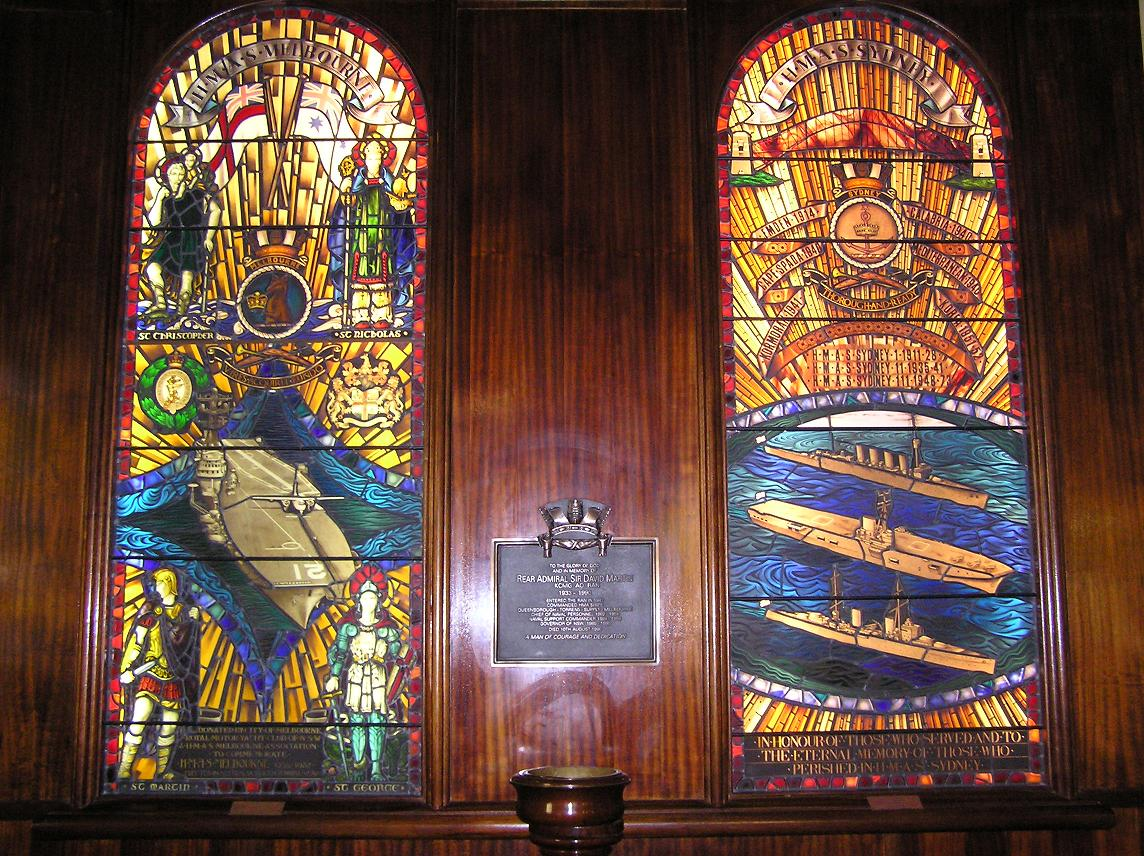
Memorial windows for the first three HMA Ships Sydney (right) and the carrier HMAS Melbourne (left)

The ship was not scrapped immediately; instead she was studied by Chinese naval architects and engineers as part of the nation's top-secret carrier development program. It is unclear whether the People's Liberation Army Navy (PLAN) orchestrated the acquisition of Melbourne or simply took advantage of the situation; Rear Admiral Zhang Zhaozhong, a staff member at the National Defence College, has stated that the Navy was unaware of the purchase until Melbourne first arrived at Guangzhou. Melbourne was the largest warship any of the Chinese experts had seen, and they were surprised by the amount of equipment which was still in place. The PLAN subsequently arranged for the ship's flight deck and all the equipment associated with flying operations to be removed so that they could be studied in depth. Reports have circulated that either a replica of the flight deck, or the deck itself, was used for clandestine training of PLANAF pilots in carrier flight operations. It has also been claimed that the Royal Australian Navy received and "politely rejected" a request from the PLAN for blueprints of the ship's steam catapult. The carrier was not dismantled for many years; according to some rumours she was not completely broken up until 2002. A 2012 article in Jane's Navy International stated that the large quantity of equipment recovered from Melbourne "undoubtedly helped" Admiral Liu Huaqing secure the Chinese government's support for his proposal to initiate an aircraft carrier development programme.

Melbourne's service is commemorated with a stained-glass window at the Garden Island Naval Chapel. One of the ship's anchors is incorporated into a memorial to naval aviation at Nowra, New South Wales. Another anchor and the starboard side ship's bell are on display at the RAN Heritage Centre at Garden Island. Memorabilia from Melbourne's voyages with the Fleet Air Arm embarked, and examples of all the types of aircraft deployed on Melbourne, are on permanent static display in the Fleet Air Arm Museum at HMAS Albatross.

Following an overhaul of the RAN battle honours system completed in 2010, Melbourne was retroactively awarded the honour "Malaysia 1965–66" for her service during the Indonesia-Malaysia Confrontation.

== See also ==
- Canberra-class
  - HMAS Adelaide (L01)
  - HMAS Canberra (L02)
- Majestic class
  - HMAS Sydney (R17)
