= HMAS Townsville =

Two ships of the Royal Australian Navy have been named HMAS Townsville, for the city of Townsville, Queensland.

- HMAS Townsville (J205), a Bathurst-class corvette that was launched in 1941, served until 1946, and was scrapped in 1956
- HMAS Townsville (FCPB 205), a Fremantle-class patrol boat launched in 1981, in service until 2007, and preserved as a museum ship

== Battle honours ==
Ships named HMAS Townsville are entitled to carry three battle honours:

- Darwin 1942
- Pacific 1942–45
- New Guinea 1944
