= Exercise Kangaroo =

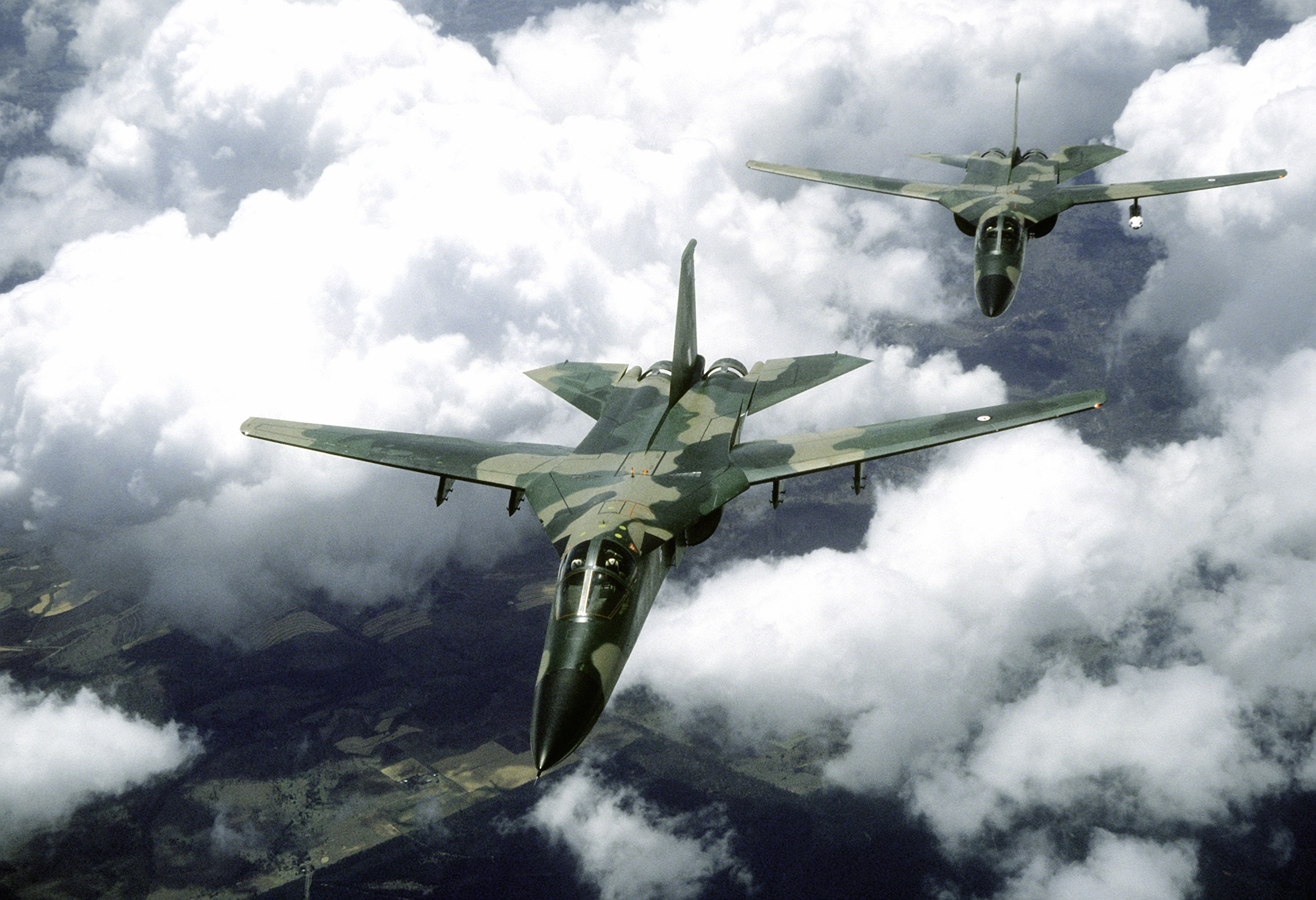
Two RAAF F-111 aircraft during exercise Kangaroo '81

Exercise Kangaroo was a joint warfare exercise that was held by the Australian Defence Force in the 1970s and 1980s.

The first iteration of Exercise Kangaroo took place in 1974. The military units involved included the aircraft carrier HMAS Melbourne (R21), which took part in the exercise in the Coral Sea, before returning to Sydney. In October 1976, Melbourne participated in Exercise Kangaroo II, before sailing to her namesake city for the carrier's 21st birthday celebrations, then returning to Sydney on 5 November.

The 1989 iteration of Exercise Kangaroo was the largest military exercise to have been undertaken in Australia during peacetime up to that time. It involved 28,000 Australian and American military personnel. The exercise next took place in 1992, with over 12,000 Australian and American personnel taking part.

When Lieutenant General John Sanderson became Commander Joint Forces Australia (CJFA) in the early 1990s, his main task was to plan the Kangaroo series of exercises. Sanderson said that when the Vice Chief of Defence Force acted as CJFA in Ex Kangaroo 1989 he could not exercise command properly because he did not have a suitable command support system. Exercises Kangaroo 89 and '92 showed the need for the co-location of the joint headquarters. At one stage of Kangaroo '92 in the space of 30 minutes, two ships, one with a battalion of infantry embarked, were 'sunk' for lack of air cover.

== See also ==
- Exercise Talisman Sabre
