= List of ship launches in 1998 =

The list of ship launches in 1998 includes a chronological list of all ships launched in 1998.

Date	Ship	Class / type	Builder	Location	Country	Notes
23 January	Sally Mærsk	S-class container ship	Odense Staalskibsvaerft	Lindø	Denmark	For Maersk Line
1 February	Finnclipper	Seapacer-class RoPax-ferry	Astilleros Españoles	Puerto Real	Spain	For Finnlines
20 February	Botnica	Icebreaker	Finnyards	Rauma	Finland	
23 February	Seeadler	Type Fassmer BL 20	Fassmer	Berne	Germany	For Federal Ministry of Transport and Digital Infrastructure
February	Dawn Merchant	RoRo-Ferry	Astilleros Espanoles SA	Sevilla	Spain	For Cenargo International Ltd.
12 March	Dechaineux	Collins-class submarine	Australian Submarine Corporation	Osborne, South Australia	Australia	
17 March	Annemieke	Sietas type 161	J.J. Sietas	Hamburg-Neuenfelde	Germany	For SAL Heavy Lift
23 March	Woody Heart	Bulk carrier	Imabari Shipbuilding	Imabari	Japan	
25 March	Grey Fox	Amber Lagoon-class freight ship	Shanghai Shipyard & Chengxi Shipyard Company	Shanghai	China	For MACS Maritime Carrier Shipping
27 March	Clansman	Ferry	Appledore Shipbuilders	Appledore	United Kingdom	For Caledonian MacBrayne
28 March	O'Kane	Arleigh Burke-class destroyer	Bath Iron Works	Bath, Maine	United States	
4 April	Primadonna	River cruise ship	Deggendorfer Werft und Eisenbau		Germany	
6 April	Clansman	Ferry	Appledore Shipbuilders Ltd.	Appledore	United Kingdom	For Caledonian MacBrayne.
14 April	Stralsund	Type Fassmer BL 20	Fassmer	Berne	Germany	For Federal Ministry of Transport and Digital Infrastructure
18 April	Finneagle	Seapacer-class RoPax-ferry	Astilleros Españoles	Puerto Real	Spain	For Finnlines
24 April	Sine Mærsk	S-class container ship	Odense Staalskibsvaerft	Lindø	Denmark	For Maersk Line
24 April	Hawkesbury	Huon-class minehunter	Australian Defence Industries	Newcastle, New South Wales	Australia	
24 April	Lena	Sietas type 161	J.J. Sietas	Hamburg-Neuenfelde	Germany	For SAL Heavy Lift
3 May	London Express	London Express-class container ship	Samsung Shipbuilding & Heavy Industries	Koje	South Korea	For Hapag-Lloyd
23 May	Warramunga	Anzac-class frigate	Tenix Defence	Williamstown, Victoria	Australia	
27 May	Kent	Type 23 frigate	Yarrow Shipbuilders	Glasgow	United Kingdom	
28 May	Brave Merchant	RoRo-Ferry	Astilleros Espanoles SA	Sevilla	Spain	For Cenargo International Ltd.
23 June	Melville	Leeuwin-class survey vessel	NQEA Ltd	Cairns, Queensland	Australia	
25 June	Seay	Bob Hope-class vehicle cargo ship	Avondale Shipyard	Avondale, Louisiana	United States	
29 June	Bussard	Type Fassmer BL 20	Fassmer	Berne	Germany	For Federal Ministry of Transport and Digital Infrastructure
10 July	P&O Nedlloyd Auckland	Container ship	Kvaerner Warnow shipyard	Warnemünde	Germany	For P&O Nedlloyd
10 August	Grimsby	Sandown-class minehunter	Vosper Thornycroft	Woolston	United Kingdom	
14 August	Svendborg Mærsk	S-class container ship	Odense Staalskibsvaerft	Lindø	Denmark	For Maersk Line
August	Varbola	Ro-Ro ferry	Astilleros de Huelva SA	Huelva	Spain	For Estonian Shipping Company
9 September	Inazuma	Murasame-class destroyer			Japan	
11 September	Tor Suecia	Tor Selandia-type RoRo-vessel	Fincantieri		Italy	For DFDS Tor Line
19 September	Vengeance	Vanguard-class submarine	Vickers Shipbuilding and Engineering Ltd	Barrow-in-Furness	United Kingdom	
24 September	Samidare	Murasame-class destroyer			Japan	
10 October	Tor Selandia	Tor Selandia-type RoRo-vessel	Fincantieri		Italy	For DFDS Tor Line
14 October	Arcticaborg	Platform supply vessel	Kværner Masa-Yards Helsinki New Shipyard	Helsinki	Finland	
17 October	Antarcticaborg	Platform supply vessel	Kværner Masa-Yards Helsinki New Shipyard	Helsinki	Finland	
30 October	Sofie Mærsk	S-class container ship	Odense Staalskibsvaerft	Lindø	Denmark	For Maersk Line
7 November	Oscar Austin	Arleigh Burke-class destroyer	Bath Iron Works	Bath, Maine	United States	
26 November	Uzushio	Oyashio-class submarine			Japan	
27 November	Voyager of the Seas	Voyager-class cruise ship	Kvaerner Masa-Yards Turku New Shipyard	Turku	Finland	For Royal Caribbean International
28 November	Neptun	Stocznia Gdynia 8138-type container ship	Stocznia Gdynia	Gdynia	Poland	For Alpha Ship
28 November	Uranus	Stocznia Gdynia 8138-type container ship	Stocznia Gdynia	Gdynia	Poland	For Alpha Ship
30 November	Jade	Survey vessel	Yantar Shipyard	Kaliningrad	Russia	For Federal Ministry of Transport and Digital Infrastructure
4 December	Toisa Coral	Offshore supply vessel	Appledore Shipbuilders Ltd.	Appledore	United Kingdom	For Toisa Ltd.
15 December	Moscow University	Tanker	NKK Corporation	Tsu	Japan	For Novoship, Russia
21 December	Tor Britannia	Tor Selandia-type RoRo-vessel	Fincantieri		Italy	For DFDS Tor Line
23 December	SuperStar Virgo	Cruise ship	Meyer Werft	Papenburg	Germany	For Star Cruises
Unknown date	Alva Maersk	Container ship	China Shipbuilding Corporation	Keelung	Taiwan	For A. P. Moller-Maersk Group
Unknown date	ATLS-9701	Aerial target launch ship	VT Halter Marine Shipbuilder	Moss Point, Mississippi	United States	For Pacific Targets and Marine Operations Division (PTMO), U.S. Department of the Navy
Unknown date	Herbert Ballam	Tug	J. Bolson & Son Ltd.	Poole	United Kingdom	For Poole Harbour Commissioners.
