= Cessnock =

Cessnock can refer to:

- Cessnock, Glasgow
  - Cessnock subway station, an underground station in Glasgow
- Cessnock, New South Wales
  - Electoral district of Cessnock, an electoral district in the New South Wales Legislative Assembly
  - City of Cessnock, the local government area
  - Cessnock Correctional Centre, a prison in the area
- HMAS Cessnock, one of two Royal Australian Navy ships:
  - HMAS Cessnock (J175), a Bathurst class corvette
  - HMAS Cessnock (FCPB 210), a Fremantle class patrol boat
