= Fantome class =

Fantome class may refer to:

- Fantome-class sloop, used by the Royal Navy 1873–1911
- Fantome-class survey motor boat, used in Australia
