= Australian Hydrographic Service =

Government agency

The Australian Hydrographic Service (formerly known as the Royal Australian Navy Hydrographic Service) is the Australian Commonwealth Government agency responsible for providing hydrographic services that meet Australia's obligations under the SOLAS convention and the national interest; enabling safe navigation, maritime trade and supporting protection of the marine environment. The agency, headquartered at the Australian Hydrographic Office in Wollongong, New South Wales, is an element of the Royal Australian Navy (RAN), and serves both military and civilian functions. The names Australian Hydrographic Service and the Australian Hydrographic Office are commonly abbreviated as AHS or AHO respectively.

== Role ==
The Australian Hydrographic Service is an element of the RAN, and serves both military and civilian functions. The headquarters of the agency is at the Australian Hydrographic Office in Wollongong, New South Wales. The Australian Hydrographic Office (AHO) is the Department of Defence agency responsible for the publication and distribution of nautical charts and other information required for the safety of ships navigating in Australian waters. The AHO is also responsible for the provision of operational surveying support, meteorology services and maritime Military Geographic Information (MGI) for Australian Defence Force (ADF) operations and exercises.

The AHO has its origins in the British Admiralty Hydrographic Office, which was established in 1795. The Admiralty carried out surveys and published charts of the Australian coast throughout the 19th century in support of the defence and commercial development of the colonies. The Royal Australian Navy (RAN) assumed responsibility for hydrographic surveys in 1920, and for the publication of charts in 1942. In 1946 the Federal Cabinet made the Commonwealth Naval Board responsible for the surveying and charting of Australian waters. This responsibility was confirmed in 1988 after a review of Commonwealth mapping activities.

Hydrographic services provided by the AHS include the mapping and surveying of undersea terrain and irregularities on and under the water's surface (known collectively as hydrography), the provision of nautical charts and other publications, such as tide tables and Notices to Mariners. Over 400 paper charts are produced by the AHS, with conversion of these to electronic navigational chart format due to be completed in 2011.

Under international agreements, the Australian charting area spans approximately one-eighth of the world's surface, extending from Cocos Island to the west, the Solomon Islands to the east, the Equator to the north, and Antarctica to the south.

== History ==
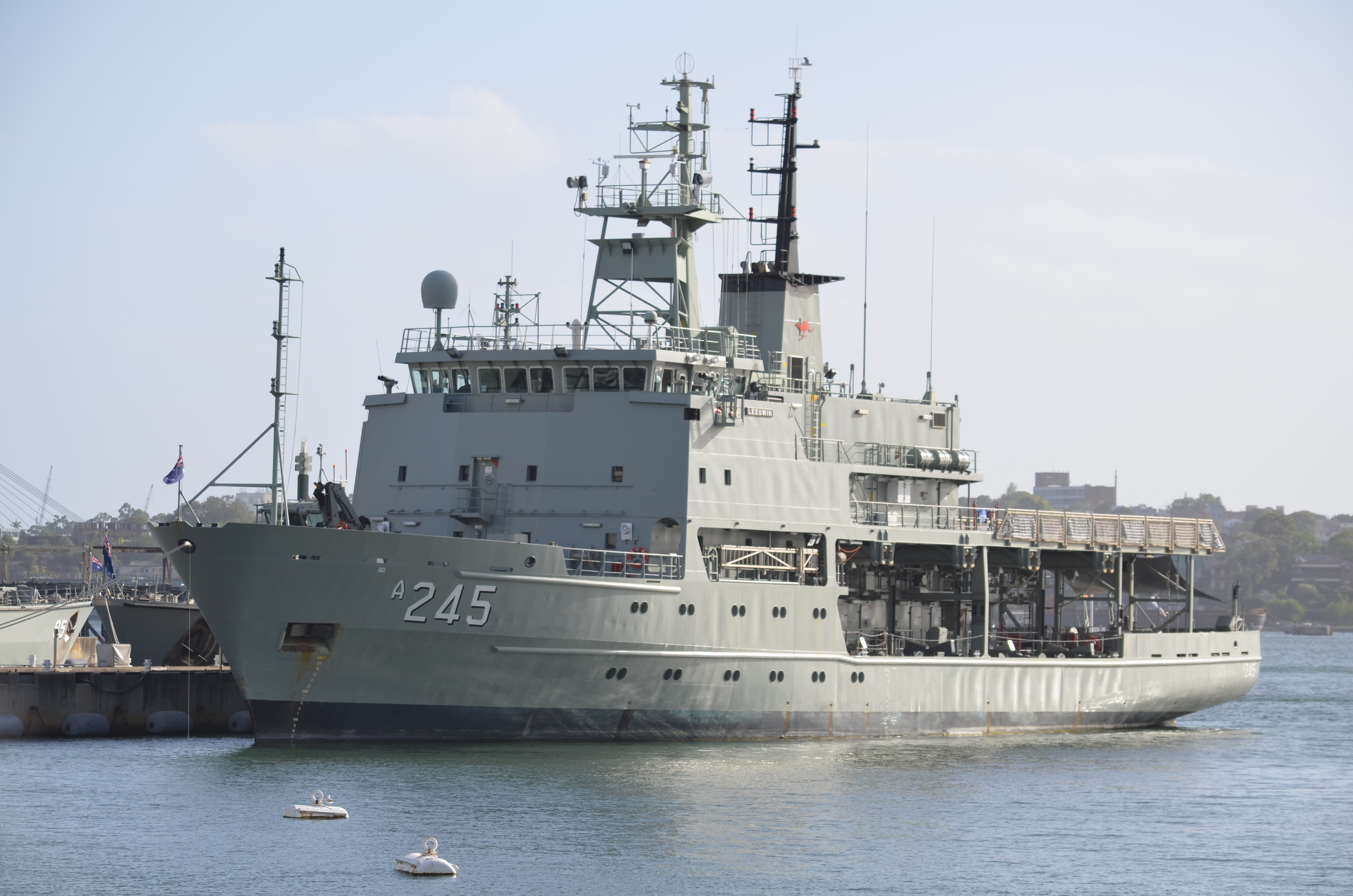
HMAS Leeuwin

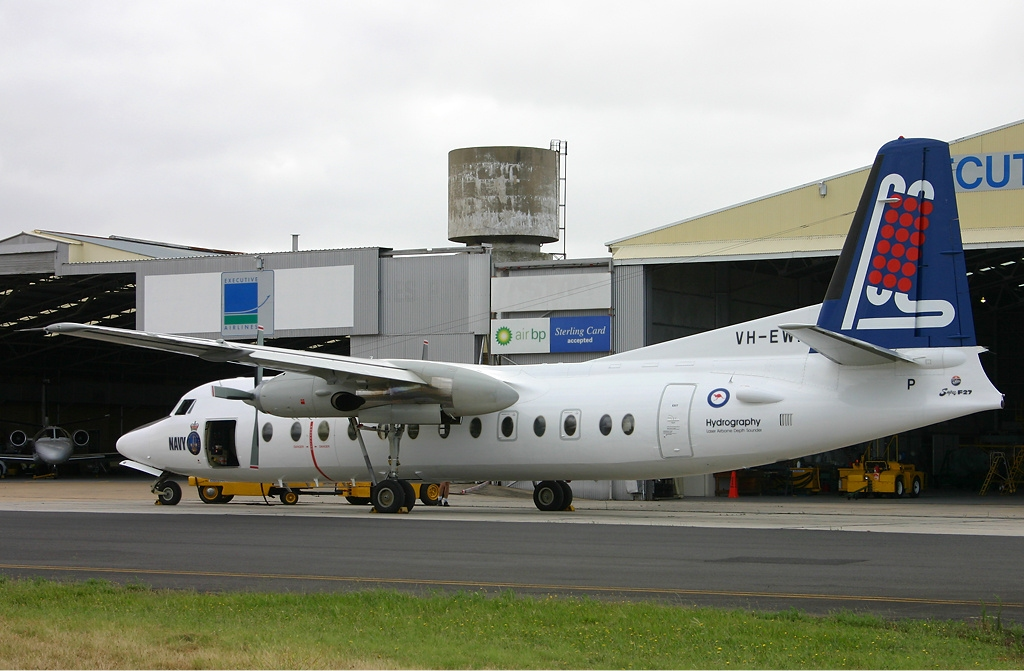
Fokker 27 formerly used by the service

Following the work of explorers, the British Admiralty established a Chart and Chronometer Depot in Sydney in 1897. The depot was to supplement the activities of Royal Navy survey ships in Australian waters. In 1913, the depot was taken over by the Australian government and was renamed the RAN Hydrographic Depot. Despite this, survey activities were performed by Royal Navy vessels until World War I, when surveying operations were concentrated in European waters.

After the war, the Admiralty decided that with higher priorities in Europe, it would provide at most a single vessel for survey operations around Australia, and the Australian government was forced to create its own hydrographic surveying service. After deliberation on whether the new hydrographic service would be military or civilian operated, the government decided that surveying would be a naval responsibility, with the RAN Hydrographic Service established on 1 October 1920. A single sloop, HMAS Geranium, was commissioned into RAN service to supplement the Royal Navy survey vessel, and was later fitted with a Fairey IIID seaplane to assist with surveys of the Great Barrier Reef. Geranium was replaced by HMAS Moresby, but the new survey ship was placed in reserve once the Great Barrier Reef survey was completed in 1929. By this point, no other survey operations (military or civilian) were being performed in Australian waters.

Surveying operations did not resume in the region until World War II, when it became evident that Age of Sail-era charts of the South West Pacific desperately needed updating. Requisitioned auxiliary ships, later supplemented by several Bathurst-class corvettes modified into survey vessels, were used to chart the waters around the East Indies and New Guinea, with the RAN designated as the charting authority responsible for supporting Allied operations in the South West Pacific Area. As well as updating navigational charts, RAN survey ships were also used to inspect and clear sites for amphibious landings. By the end of the war, sixteen vessels were attached to the Hydrographic Service, including the frigate HMAS Lachlan and five Bathurst-class corvettes.

In 1946, the Australian Cabinet decided that the RAN would remain in control of all hydrographic operations in both Australian waters and areas of Australian interest. RAN warships were used to survey waters around Australia as part of a national hydrographic survey. In 1947, the Antarctic exploration ship HMAS Wyatt Earp was commissioned, but only one voyage was completed, and RAN hydrographic operations in the Antarctic were stopped in 1948. In 1963, a resource and export boom required the Hydrographic Service to change its focus from a comprehensive national survey to the charting of new ports and shipping routes suitable for deep-draught merchant ships. A purpose-built survey ship, HMAS Moresby entered service in 1964. Survey of ports and shipping routes was completed by 1974. From 1979 onwards, the Hydrographic Service began to provide hydrographic assistance and training to Pacific island nations. During 1989 and 1990, four Paluma-class survey ships entered service with the RAN, followed by two larger Leeuwin-class ships in 1999. In 1993, the RAN began to use Laser Airborne Depth Sounder (LADS) technology to assist in surveying: this was first fitted to a Fokker F27 aircraft, then in 2010 was installed in a De Havilland Dash 8, operated by the Laser Airborne Depth Sounder Flight.

== Units ==
As of 2024, the following units and equipment are assigned to the AHS:

- The Australian Hydrographic Office, located in Wollongong, New South Wales. Was opened in 1994, and has a staff of 120 mixed civilian and military personnel.
- Two Leeuwin-class survey vessels
  - HMAS Leeuwin
  - HMAS Melville

== See also ==
- Australian Pilot
- Land Information New Zealand
- United States Office of Coast Survey
