= Wyatt Earp (disambiguation) =

Wyatt Earp was an Old West lawman.

Wyatt Earp may also refer to:

== Ships ==
- ASV Wyatt Earp, an Australian survey vessel
- HMAS Wyatt Earp, a Royal Australian Navy vessel
- SS Wyatt Earp, a World War II American cargo ship

== Media ==
- Wyatt Earp (card game), a rummy-like card game
- Wyatt Earp (film) (1994), an American film
- Wyatt Earp: Frontier Marshal, a biography of Wyatt Earp
- Wyatt Earp comic book series published by Atlas Comics (1955–60)

== See also ==
- The Life and Legend of Wyatt Earp
- Wyatt ERP
- Wyatt Earp's Revenge
