= NQEA =

Shipbuilding company in Cairns, Australia

NQEA Pty Ltd
- Founded: 1948; 78 years ago
- Headquarters: Cairns, Australia
- Services: Ship builder
- Website: www.nqea.com.au

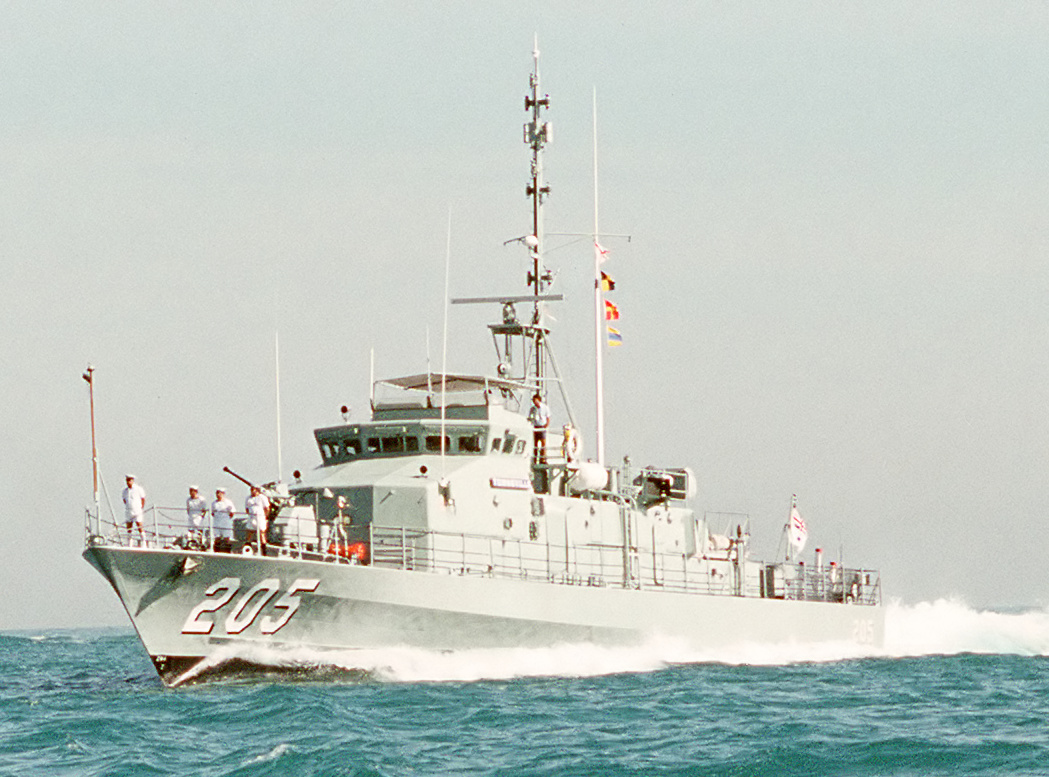
HMAS Townsville in 1990

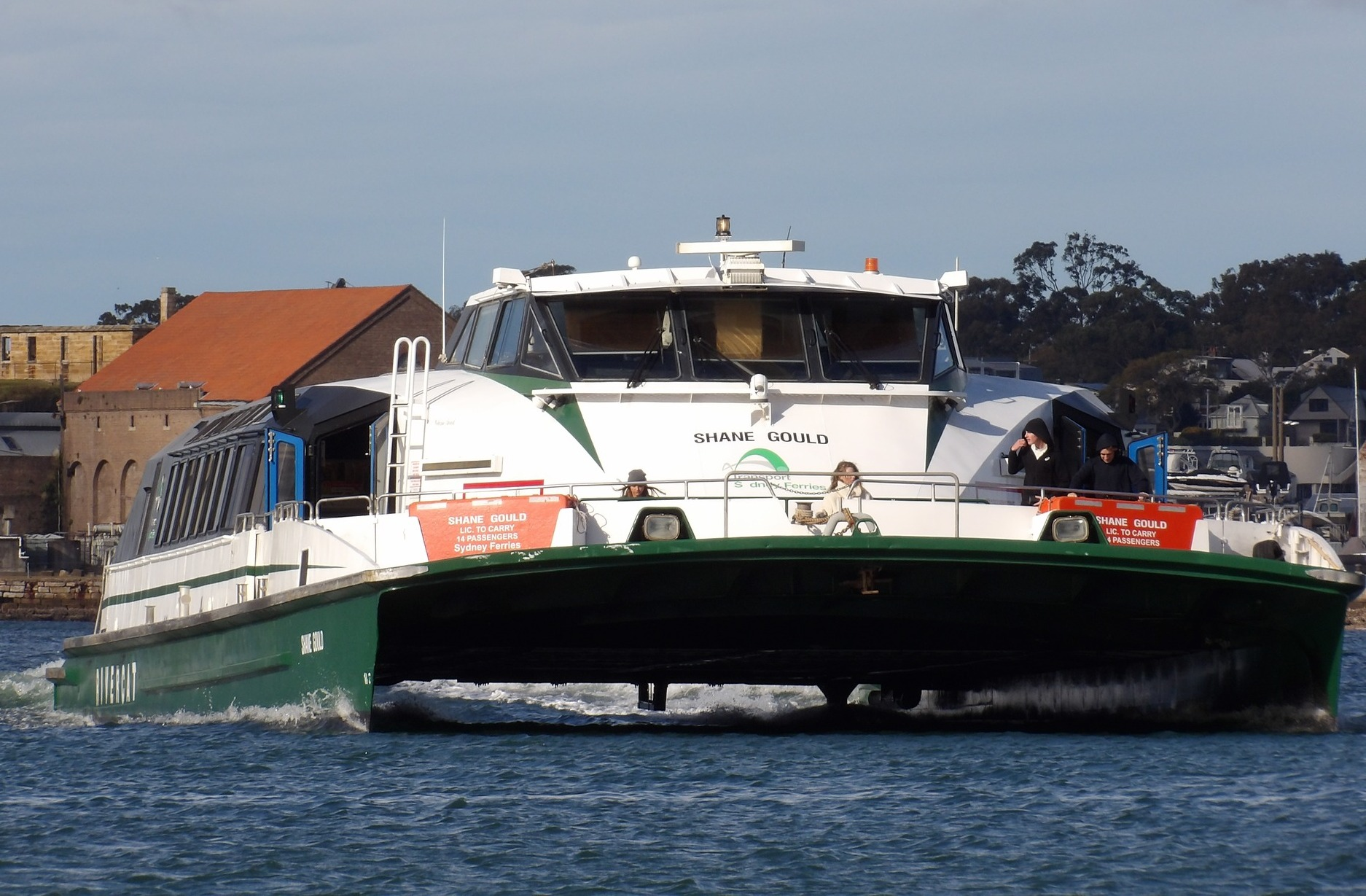
RiverCat Shane Gould in July 2025

NQEA Pty Ltd is an engineering and shipbuilding company based in Cairns, Australia. The company was founded in 1948 as an engineering supply company named North Queensland Engineers & Agents, then expanded in 1966 into shipbuilding and was renamed.

NQEA has built several ships for the Royal Australian Navy (including the Fremantle-class patrol boats and Leeuwin-class survey ships). The company was contracted to build modules to form the hulls of the Hobart-class air warfare destroyer project in May 2009, but lost the contract a month later to BAE Systems Australia after admissions that an internal restructuring may lead to difficulties meeting the contracted obligations.

The company has also built catamaran ferries for the State Transit Authority (now operated by Sydney Ferries), London based Thames Clippers, and operators in French Polynesia and the Netherlands.

== Ships built ==
- Franklin
- Fremantle-class patrol boats
  - HMAS Warrnambool
  - HMAS Townsville
  - HMAS Wollongong
  - HMAS Launceston
  - HMAS Whyalla
  - HMAS Ipswich
  - HMAS Cessnock
  - HMAS Bendigo
  - HMAS Gawler
  - HMAS Geraldton
  - HMAS Dubbo
  - HMAS Geelong
  - HMAS Gladstone
  - HMAS Bunbury
- RiverCats
  - Dawn Fraser
  - Betty Cuthbert
  - Shane Gould
  - Marlene Mathews
  - Evonne Goolagong
  - Marjorie Jackson
- Leeuwin-class survey ships
  - HMAS Leeuwin
  - HMAS Melville
- Thames Clippers ferries
  - Hurricane Clipper
  - Sun Clipper
  - Moon Clipper
- Jetcats
  - Blue Fin
  - Sir David Martin
  - Sea Eagle
- Coral Discoverer
