= HMAS Dubbo (FCPB 214) =

1984 Fremantle-class patrol boat

History

Australia
- Namesake: City of Dubbo
- Builder: NQEA, Cairns
- Laid down: 9 August 1982
- Launched: 21 January 1984
- Commissioned: 10 March 1984
- Decommissioned: 2 February 2007
- Home port: HMAS Coonawarra
- Motto: "Fight to the Finish"
- Honours and awards: One inherited battle honour
- Fate: Scrapped
- Badge

General characteristics
- Class & type: Fremantle-class patrol boat
- Displacement: 220 tons
- Length: 137.6 ft (41.9 m)
- Beam: 25.25 ft (7.70 m)
- Draught: 5.75 ft (1.75 m)
- Propulsion: 2 MTU series 538 diesel engines, 3,200 shp (2,400 kW), 2 propellers
- Speed: 30 knots (56 km/h; 35 mph)
- Range: 5,000 nmi (9,300 km; 5,800 mi) at 5 knots (9.3 km/h; 5.8 mph)
- Complement: 22
- Armament: 1 Bofors 40 mm/60 gun; 2 12.7 mm machine guns; 1 81 mm mortar (removed later)

HMAS Dubbo (FCPB 214), named for the city of Dubbo, New South Wales, was a Fremantle-class patrol boat of the Royal Australian Navy (RAN).

== Design and construction ==
Starting in the late 1960s, planning began for a new class of patrol boat to replace the Attack class, with designs calling for improved seakeeping capability, and updated weapons and equipment. The Fremantles had a full load displacement of 220 tonnes (220 long tons; 240 short tons), were 137.6 feet (41.9 m) long overall, had a beam of 24.25 feet (7.39 m), and a maximum draught of 5.75 feet (1.75 m). Main propulsion machinery consisted of two MTU series 538 diesel engines, which supplied 3,200 shaft horsepower (2,400 kW) to the two propeller shafts. Exhaust was not expelled through a funnel, like most ships, but through vents below the waterline. The patrol boat could reach a maximum speed of 30 knots (56 km/h; 35 mph), and had a maximum range of 5,000 nautical miles (9,300 km; 5,800 mi) at 5 knots (9.3 km/h; 5.8 mph). The ship's company consisted of 22 personnel. Each patrol boat was armed with a single Bofors 40mm gun as main armament, supplemented by two .50 cal Browning machineguns and an 81-mm mortar, although the mortar was removed from all ships sometime after 1988. The main weapon was originally to be two 30-mm guns on a twin-mount, but the reconditioned Bofors were selected to keep costs down; provision was made to install an updated weapon later in the class' service life, but this did not eventuate.

Dubbo was laid down by NQEA in Cairns, Queensland on 9 August 1982, launched on 21 January 1984 in the presence of Thomas Arthur Slattery and Joan Slattery, then Mayor and Mayoress of Dubbo, and commissioned into the RAN on 10 March 1984.

== Fate ==
Dubbo was decommissioned at HMAS Coonawarra on 2 February 2007, and was the last ship of her class to be stationed at Coonawarra. The patrol boat was broken up for scrap in Darwin during 2006 and 2007, at a cost of $450,000 to the Australian government.
