= ASV Wyatt Earp =

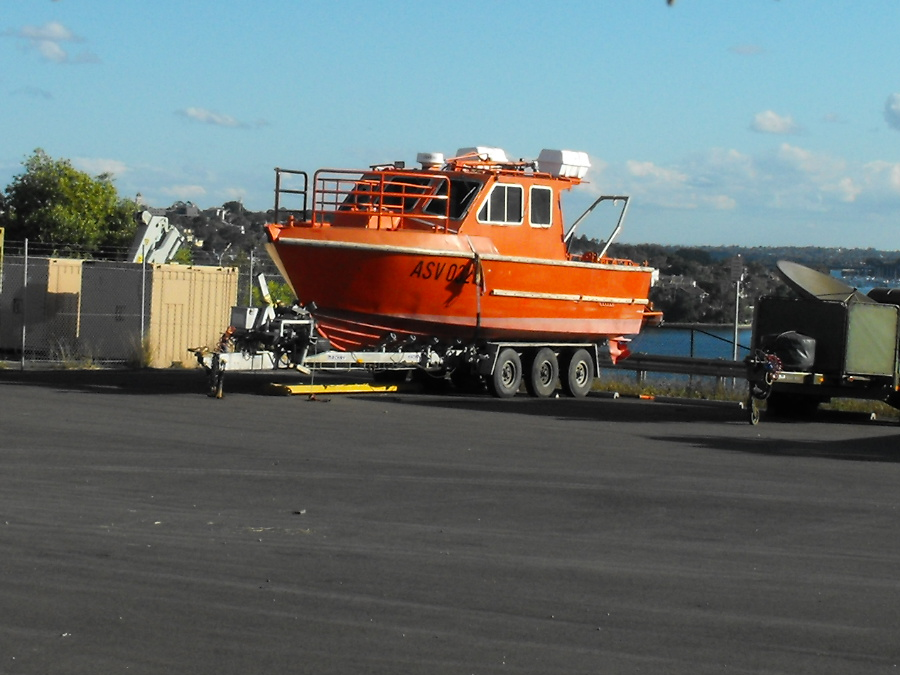
- ASV Wyatt Earp in temporary storage at HMAS Waterhen

History

Australia
- Name: Wyatt Earp
- Operator: Australian Hydrographic Service
- Builder: Pro Marine, Seaford, Victoria
- In service: 1993

General characteristics
- Type: Survey launch (modified Fantome class)
- Displacement: 5.77 t (5.68 long tons; 6.36 short tons) full load
- Length: 8.15 m (26 ft 9 in) w/l; 9.2 m (30 ft 2 in) o/a
- Draught: 0.53 m (1 ft 9 in)
- Propulsion: 2 × Volvo Penta AQAD 41D/SP290 diesels; 400 bhp (300 kW); 2 × outdrives
- Speed: 22.5 knots (41.7 km/h; 25.9 mph)
- Range: 306 nmi (567 km; 352 mi) at 18 kn (33 km/h; 21 mph)
- Complement: 4-5
- Sensors & processing systems: JRC JMA-2141 navigation radar; STN Atlas Elektronik Deso 22 echo sounder; Differential GPS receiver

The Antarctic Survey Vessel (ASV) Wyatt Earp (ASV 01/DMS 329) is a survey launch operated by the Australian Hydrographic Service since 1993. Based on the Royal Australian Navy's Fantome-class survey launches, Wyatt Earp was built specifically for hydrographic survey duties in Antarctic waters.

== Design and construction ==
Wyatt Earp is a smaller version of the Fantome class survey launches used by the Royal Australian Navy, modified for operations in Antarctic waters. The vessel has a full load displacement of 5.77 tonnes (5.68 long tons; 6.36 short tons), is 8.15 metres (26 ft 9 in) long at the waterline and 9.2 metres (30 ft 2 in) in length overall, and has a draught of 0.53 metres (1 ft 9 in). Propulsion is provided by two Volvo Penta AQAD 41D/SP290 diesels, which provide 400 brake horsepower (300 kW) to the two outdrives. Maximum speed is 22.5 knots (41.7 km/h; 25.9 mph), and Wyatt Earp has a range of 306 nautical miles (567 km; 352 mi) at 18 knots (33 km/h; 21 mph). When built, the boat's sensor suite includes a JRC JMA-2141 navigation radar, an STN Atlas Elektronik Deso 22 echo sounder, and a differential GPS receiver. Wyatt Earp has a complement of four to five.

Wyatt Earp was built by Pro Marine at Seaford, Victoria. She entered service in 1993.

== Operational history ==
Wyatt Earp is operated by the Australian Hydrographic Service (AHS). The vessel is not used on a constant basis; her deployment can only occur if a resupply ship chartered by the Australian Antarctic Division is capable of transporting and serving as a base ship to Wyatt Earp and the AHS's Deployable Geospatial Support Team.

The boat was deployed to the Antarctic during 2003 and 2004.

Wyatt Earp was not sent to the Antarctic again until December 2013. During the two-month operation, the survey craft was deployed from Aurora Australis on seven occasions for survey work in the waters around Casey Station.
