= Coral Discoverer =

Cruise ship

History
- Name: Coral Discoverer (2015–); Oceanic Discoverer (2006–2015); Oceanic Princess (2005–2006)
- Owner: Coral Expeditions
- Operator: Coral Expeditions
- Port of registry: Australia
- Route: Australia, South Pacific and South-east Asia
- Ordered: 2003
- Builder: NQEA
- Cost: $35 million
- Laid down: 20 June 2003
- Launched: 9 January 2005
- Completed: 27 April 2005
- Maiden voyage: 2005
- In service: 2005–
- Home port: Cairns, Queensland, Australia
- Status: Active

General characteristics
- Class & type: Cruise ship
- Tonnage: 1,838 GT
- Length: 63 m (206 ft 8 in)
- Beam: 13 m (42 ft 8 in)
- Draught: 3 m (9 ft 10 in)
- Decks: 4
- Speed: 14 knots (26 km/h; 16 mph)
- Capacity: 72 passengers
- Crew: Up to 25

Coral Discoverer is an expedition cruise ship operating in Australia and Oceania. She was previously named Oceanic Princess and Oceanic Discoverer. The ship was launched in 2005 by NQEA in Cairns, Australia.

== Operations ==
The 72 passenger Coral Discoverer is homeported in Cairns, Queensland and is one of three vessels in the Coral Expeditions fleet, operating alongside Coral Expeditions I and Coral Expeditions II.

Coral Discoverer has four passenger decks, containing 36 passenger cabins, an open seat dining room and an al fresco dining deck, lounge and lecture lounge, two cocktail bars and a sun deck. She is equipped with a range of excursion tenders including inflatable zodiacs, glass bottom boat, kayaks and the 'Xplorer' excursion tender.

The ship operates itineraries that include Australia's 'Top End' and Kimberley, Tasmania, Papua New Guinea, Melanesia, New Zealand, Indonesia and West Papua.

She starred in a 3 hour long SBS Slow TV Broadcast The Kimberley Cruise: Australia's Last Great Wilderness that aired on 13 January 2019.
