= Laser Airborne Depth Sounder Flight RAN =

Laser Airborne Depth Sounder Flight RAN LADS
- Ship's badge for LADS Flight
- Active: 1992–2019
- Country: Australia
- Branch: Royal Australian Navy
- Role: Hydrographic Survey
- Size: One flight
- Part of: Australian Hydrographic Service
- Airbase: Cairns Airport, Queensland
- Motto: Soaring to New Depths

Aircraft flown
- Reconnaissance: Bombardier Dash 8-200

The Laser Airborne Depth Sounder (LADS) Flight was a unit of the Royal Australian Navy. Unlike the rest of the flying units of the RAN, it was not controlled by the Fleet Air Arm from HMAS Albatross, but instead fell under the operational control of the Australian Hydrographic Service at HMAS Cairns, providing a platform for the operation of the laser airborne depth sounder system. LADS Flight conducted its last sortie on 7 November 2019.

== History ==
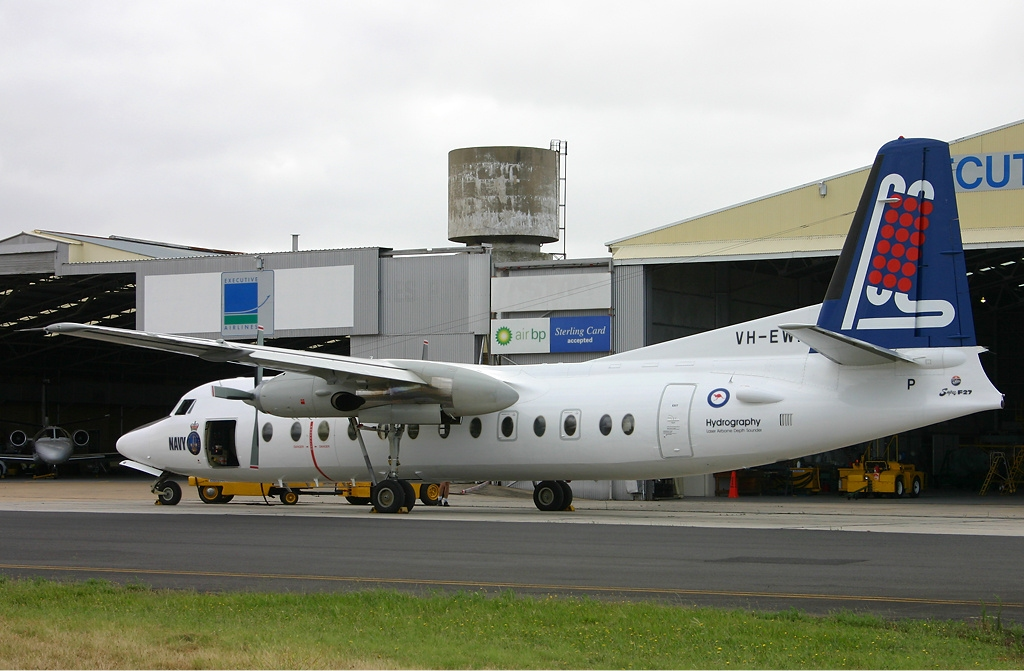
The LADS Flight was originally equipped with a Fokker F27.

In the 1970s, the Royal Australian Navy's Hydrographic Service was still limited in its ability to survey the vastness of Australia's coastal waters, and was still producing charts on areas where surveying was incomplete or had not even taken place. As a consequence, the RAN began to search for a way of effectively surveying the Australian coastline from the air, which led to the development of the Laser Airborne Depth Sounder system by the Defence Science and Technology Organisation, a part of the Australian Department of Defence, with trials beginning in 1977. In 1992, a new unit was formed to operate the system, the Laser Airborne Depth Sounder Flight, with the LADS system fitted to a highly modified Fokker F27 aircraft. This aircraft was subsequently replaced in 2009 by a modified Bombardier Dash 8.

== Operation ==
The LADS Flight was a joint operation between the Australian Hydrographic Service and the Fugro LADS Corporation, part of Fugro a Dutch corporation, which also runs hydrographic operations for the private sector. The aircraft itself was owned by the Fugro LADS Corporation, which also provides the flight crews and system maintenance technicians. Aircraft engineers came from the civilian contractor, Surveillance Australia, while the hydrographic specialists are serving members of the RAN. The flight was stationed at Cairns in the far north of Queensland, but could be deployed to other locations for up to three months at a time; the aircraft had an operational endurance of up to seven hours for operations close to its base, reducing to four hours on station at a distance of up to 300 nautical miles.

In December 2016, the aircraft deployed to the South Island of New Zealand to assist in surveying the coast following the Kaikōura earthquake.

== Laser Airborne Depth Sounder ==
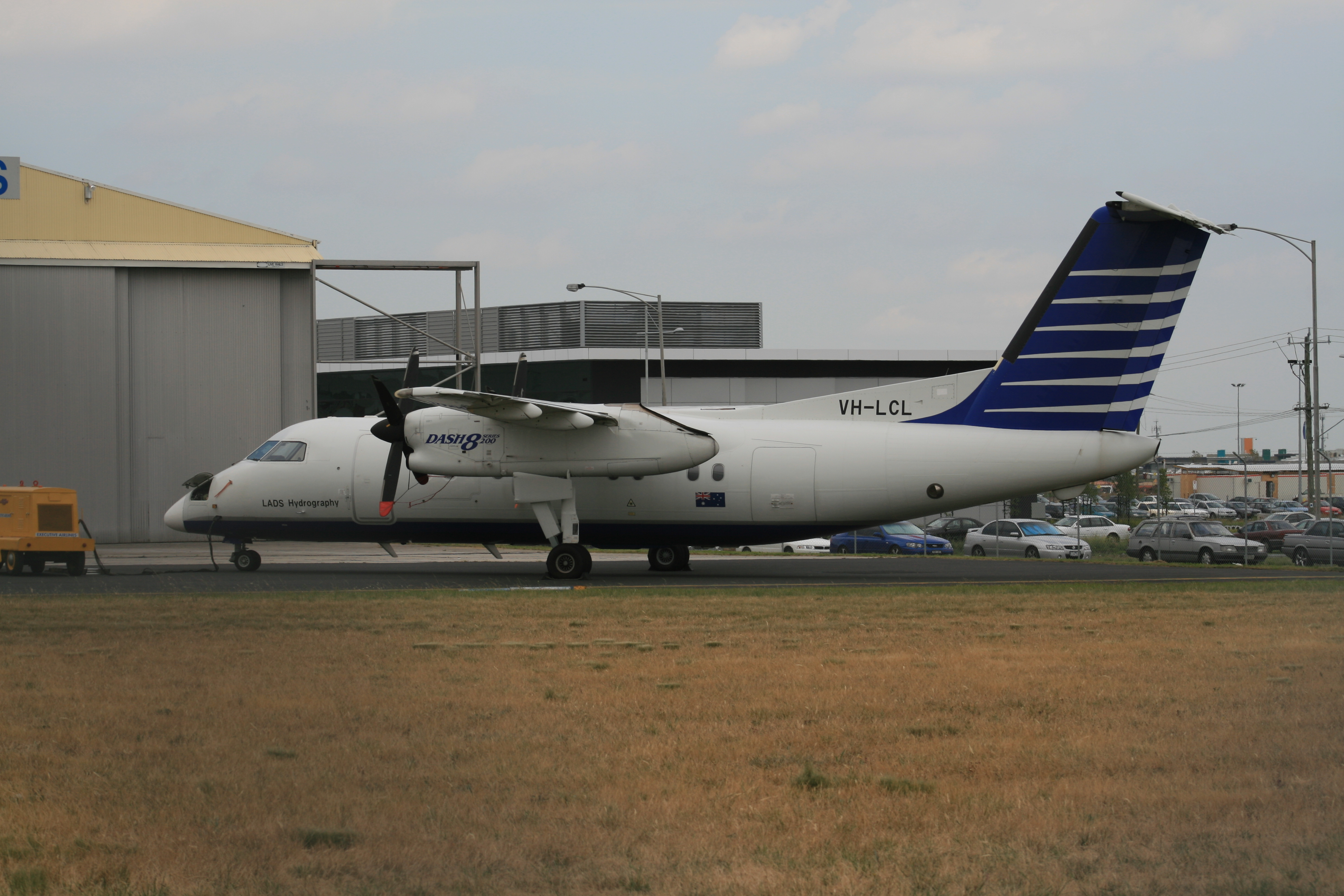
LADS-equipped de Havilland Canada Dash 8 at Essendon Airport in Melbourne, Australia (2007)

The Laser Airborne Depth Sounder (LADS) is an airborne lidar bathymetry system used for hydrographic surveying by the Australian Hydrographic Service (AHS). The system uses the difference between the sea surface and the sea floor as calculated from the aircraft's altitude to generate hydrographic data.

The lack of progress made in surveying Australia's territorial waters, most of which was unsurveyed or relying on Age of Sail-era charts prompted the Royal Australian Navy to seek a method of effectively surveying large areas from the air in the 1970s. The Defence Science and Technology Organisation developed the LADS system, with feasibility trials beginning 1977.

The LADS system is built around a Nd:YAG laser, which emits an infrared beam pulsed at 990 hertz. The beam is frequency doubled to produce a green laser. This is split into two beams, one infra-red, one green, by an optical coupler, with the infra-red beam aimed directly below the aircraft, and the green beam directed across the target area with a scanning mirror. The infra-red laser does not penetrate the water's surface, and its reflected pulse indicates the height of the aircraft above the surface. However, the green laser penetrates to the ocean floor, and the return pulse from the green laser indicates the height of the aircraft from the ocean floor; the difference between the two values is used to calculate the water's depth. The data from the lasers is not processed aboard the aircraft, but instead by a ground support team, with aircraft flight data and global positioning system information used to help generate hydrographic readings. The aircraft makes multiple, overlapping passes of the target area to ensure accurate data is collected. The LADS system is capable of taking 990 soundings per second, with data points positioned 2 to 6 metres (6 ft 7 in to 19 ft 8 in) apart across a swath up to 288 metres (945 ft) wide. The system is capable of working with waters up to 70 metres (230 ft) deep, and can be modified to perform land surveys of areas with an altitude variance less than 50 metres (160 ft)

The first LADS system for use in service by the RAN/AHS was developed under a contract from DSTO by CJ Abell/Vision Systems (subsequently acquired by Tenix) in conjunction with BHP Engineering and with assistance from subcontractors AWA Defence Industries, BAE Australia, Honeywell and East West Airlines who provided a Fokker F27 modified to accept the LADS hardware, including a window in the floor of the fuselage. The contract was closely supervised by DSTO, ably led by Mike Penny who was widely known as the "father of LADS" due to his tireless leadership of the project since inception. Vision Systems/Tenix supported LADS in service for the RAN for many years until its sale to Fugro.

LADS entered service with the AHS in 1993. The equipment was initially fitted to a Fokker F27 Friendship aircraft. In 2010, the system was installed in a de Havilland Canada Dash 8 aircraft.
