= HMAS Cessnock =

Two ships of the Royal Australian Navy have been named HMAS Cessnock, after the town of Cessnock, New South Wales.

- HMAS Cessnock (J175), a Bathurst-class corvette laid down in 1941 and paid off in 1946
- HMAS Cessnock (FCPB 210), a Fremantle-class patrol boat laid down in 1981 and in service until 2005

== Battle honours ==
Four battle honours were awarded to ships named HMAS Cessnock:

- Pacific 1942
- New Guinea 1942
- Indian Ocean 1942–45
- Sicily 1943
