= HMAS Dubbo =

Two vessels of the Royal Australian Navy have been named HMAS Dubbo, for the town of Dubbo, New South Wales.

- HMAS Dubbo (J251), a Bathurst-class corvette which entered service in 1942 and was sold for scrap in 1958
- HMAS Dubbo (FCPB 214), a Fremantle-class patrol boat that entered service in 1984 and was decommissioned in 2007

== Battle honours ==
Ships named HMAS Dubbo are entitled to carry a single battle honour:

- Pacific 1942–45
