= HMAS Cessnock (FCPB 210) =

1983 Fremantle-class patrol boat

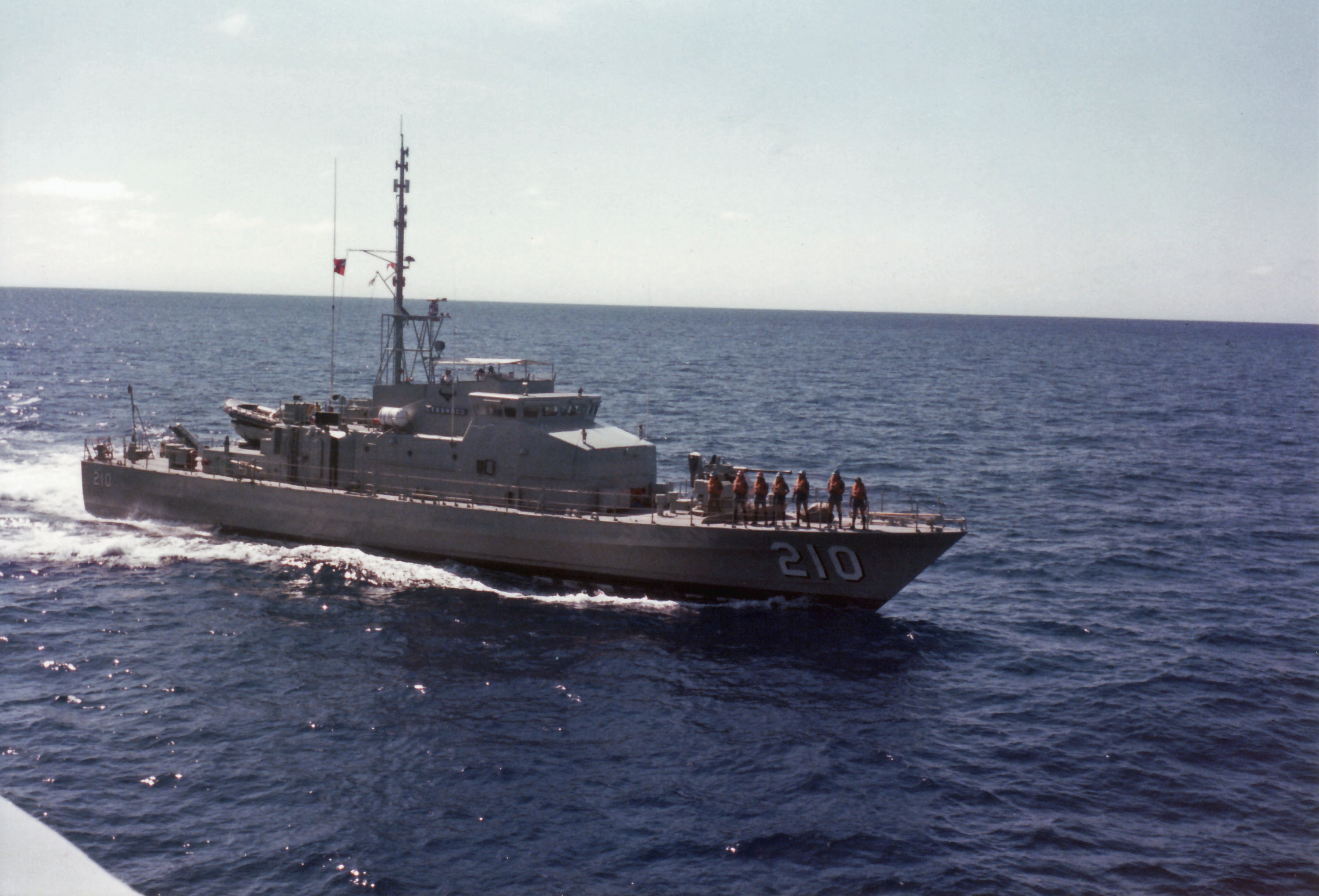
- HMAS Cessnock

History

Australia
- Namesake: City of Cessnock
- Builder: NQEA, Cairns
- Laid down: 9 March 1981
- Launched: 15 January 1983
- Commissioned: 5 March 1983
- Decommissioned: 23 June 2005
- Home port: HMAS Coonawarra
- Motto: "No Steps Backward"
- Honours and awards: Four inherited battle honours
- Fate: Scrapped
- Badge

General characteristics
- Class & type: Fremantle-class patrol boat
- Displacement: 220 tons
- Length: 137.6 ft (41.9 m)
- Beam: 25.25 ft (7.70 m)
- Draught: 5.75 ft (1.75 m)
- Propulsion: 2 MTU series 538 diesel engines, 3,200 shp (2,400 kW), 2 propellers
- Speed: 30 knots (56 km/h; 35 mph)
- Range: 5,000 nmi (9,300 km; 5,800 mi) at 5 knots (9.3 km/h; 5.8 mph)
- Complement: 22
- Armament: 1 Bofors 40 mm/60 gun; 2 12.7 mm machine guns; 1 81 mm mortar (removed later)

HMAS Cessnock (FCPB 210), named for the city of Cessnock, New South Wales was a Fremantle-class patrol boat of the Royal Australian Navy (RAN).

== Design and construction ==
Starting in the late 1960s, planning began for a new class of patrol boat to replace the Attack class, with designs calling for improved seakeeping capability, and updated weapons and equipment. The Fremantles had a full load displacement of 220 tonnes (220 long tons; 240 short tons), were 137.6 feet (41.9 m) long overall, had a beam of 24.25 feet (7.39 m), and a maximum draught of 5.75 feet (1.75 m). Main propulsion machinery consisted of two MTU series 538 diesel engines, which supplied 3,200 shaft horsepower (2,400 kW) to the two propeller shafts. Exhaust was not expelled through a funnel, like most ships, but through vents below the waterline. The patrol boat could reach a maximum speed of 30 knots (56 km/h; 35 mph), and had a maximum range of 5,000 nautical miles (9,300 km; 5,800 mi) at 5 knots (9.3 km/h; 5.8 mph). The ship's company consisted of 22 personnel. Each patrol boat was armed with a single Bofors 40mm gun, supplemented by two .50 cal Browning machineguns and an 81 mm mortar. The mortar was removed from all ships sometime after 1988. The main weapon was originally to be two 30 mm guns on a twin-mount, but the reconditioned Bofors were selected to keep costs down; provision was made to install an updated weapon later in the class' service life, but this did not eventuate.

Cessnock was laid down by the NQEA in Cairns, Queensland on 9 March 1981, launched on 15 January 1983, and commissioned into the RAN on 5 March 1983.

== Operational history ==
Following Cyclone Bola in 1988, Cessnock provided assistance to 30 villages across 11 islands in Vanuatu.

== Fate ==
Cessnock was decommissioned on 23 June 2005. It was scrapped in Darwin during 2006, at a cost of $400,000 to the Australian government.
