= Leeuwin-class survey vessel =

Australian naval research ship class

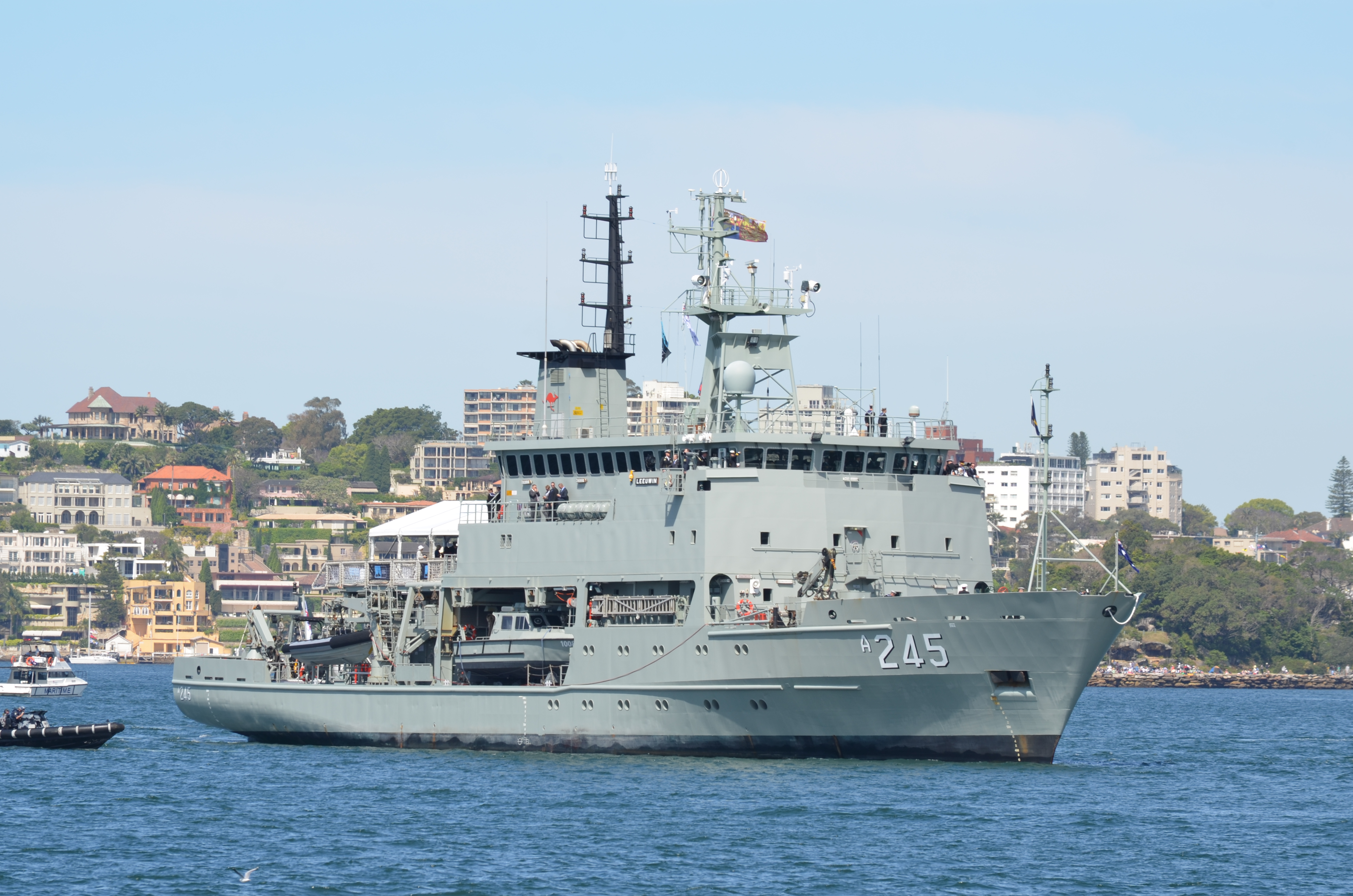
- HMAS Leeuwin in 2013

Class overview
- Name: Leeuwin class
- Builders: NQEA, Cairns
- Built: 1996–2000
- In commission: 2000–present
- Completed: 2
- Active: 1
- Retired: 1

General characteristics
- Type: Hydrographic survey ship
- Displacement: 2,170 tons
- Length: 71.2 m (233 ft 7 in)
- Beam: 15.2 m (49 ft 10 in)
- Draught: 4.3 m (14 ft 1 in)
- Propulsion: 4 × GEC Alsthom 6RK 215 generators, 2 x Alsthom electric motors, 2 shafts; 1 × Schottel bow thruster
- Speed: 13 knots (24 km/h; 15 mph)
- Range: 18,000 nautical miles (33,000 km; 21,000 mi) at 9 knots (17 km/h; 10 mph)
- Complement: 10 officers, 46 sailors, up to 5 trainees
- Sensors & processing systems: Radar: Sperry Vision-Master FT navigation radars x 2; X-band and S-band.; Sonar: Nautel C-Tech CMAS 30D; hull mounted omni-directional active sonar; Teledyne Seabat T50 Muti-Beam Echo Sounder; Ship specific hydrographic / navigation Single-Beam Echo Sounder(s); EdgeTech Towed Side-Scan Sonar
- Armament: 2 x 12.7 mm machine guns
- Aircraft carried: Not permanently embarked

The Leeuwin class is a two-ship class of hydrographic survey vessels operated by the Royal Australian Navy (RAN). Leeuwin and Melville were ordered from NQEA in 1996, and were commissioned in 2000. The ships are capable of charting waters up to 6,000 metres (20,000 ft) deep, carry three Fantome-class survey boats, and could operate an AS 350B Squirrel helicopter. In addition to surveying duties, since 2001 both vessels have been used to supplement the RAN patrol force. Leeuwin is based at HMAS Cairns, while Melville was decommissioned in August 2024.

== Design and construction ==
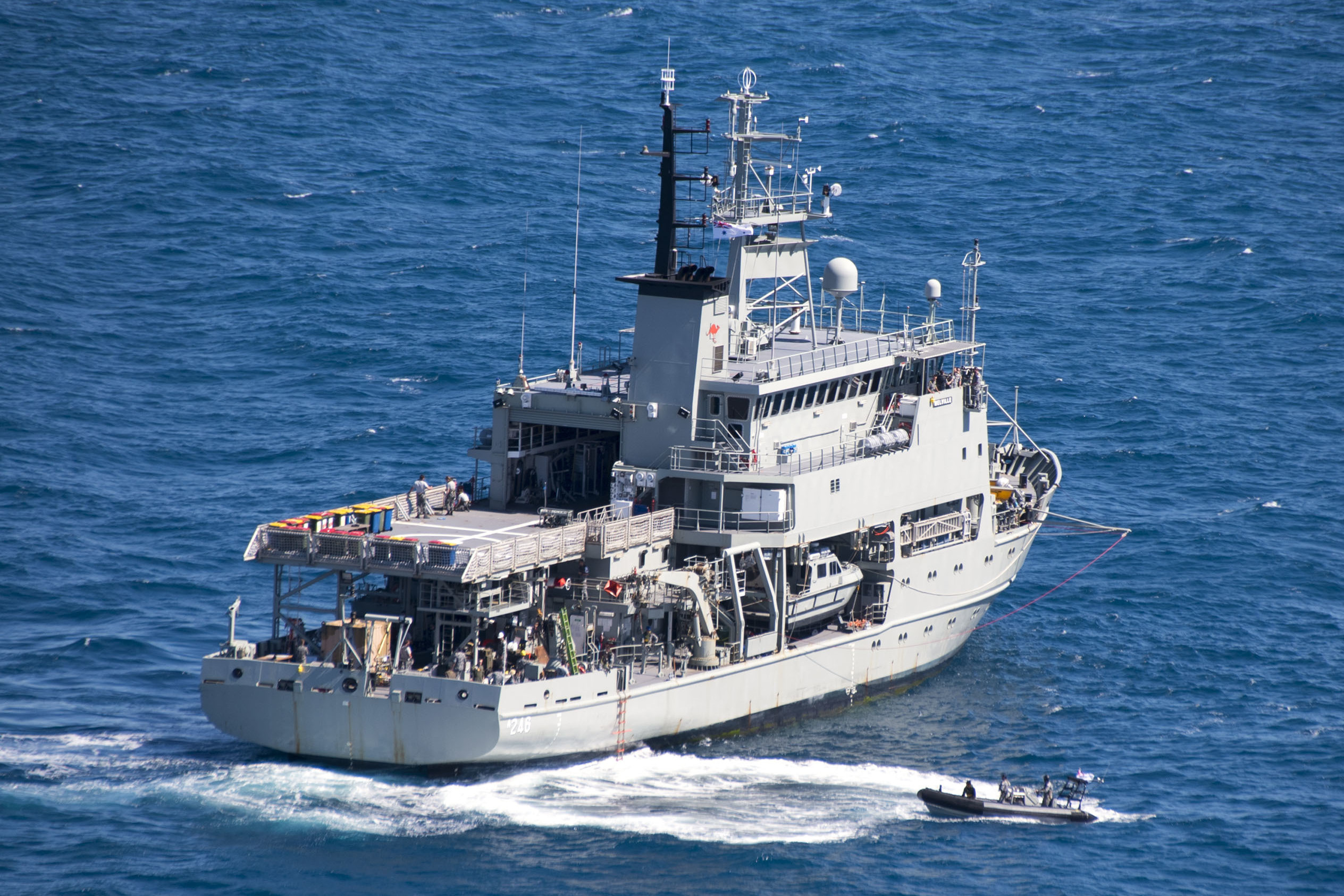
Stern view of HMAS Melville, showing the ship's helicopter deck

The ships have a displacement of 2,170 tons at full load. They are 71.2 metres (234 ft) long, with a beam of 15.2 metres (50 ft), and a draught of 4.3 metres (14 ft). Main propulsion machinery consists of four GEC Alsthom 6RK 215 diesel generators, which supply two Alsthom electric motors, each driving a propeller shaft. A Schottel bow thruster is fitted for additional manoeuvrability. Maximum speed is 13 knots (24 km/h; 15 mph), with a range of 18,000 nautical miles (33,000 km; 21,000 mi) at 9 knots (17 km/h; 10 mph).

Each ship was originally fitted with a STN Atlas 9600 APRA I-band navigational radar, now updated to Sperry Vision-Master FT dual X-band and S-Band radar system. The vessels are fitted with a Nautel C-Tech CMAS 36/39 hull-mounted omni-directional active sonar, updated to CMAS 30D configuration. In addition, the ships were originally fitted with an Atlas Fansweep-20 multibeam echo sounder and an Atlas Hydrographic Deso single-beam echo sounder, and a Klein 2000 towed sidescan sonar array. These have been updated to a Teledyne Seabat T50 IDH Multi-Beam Echo-Sounder, ship specific Single-Beam Echo-Sounders, and an EdgeTech towed sidescan sonar. The sonars and echo sounders allow the vessels to chart waters up to 6,000 metres (20,000 ft) deep. There are three sets of davits fitted; although normally used to carry the 10.7-metre (35 ft) Fantome-class survey boats, they can be configured for other small craft. In addition, they carry a RHIB and two utility boats. The Leeuwins are fitted with a helicopter deck for an AS 350B Squirrel helicopter, although lack long-term hosting facilities. They are armed with two single 12.7 mm machine guns.

The ship's company consists of 10 officers and 46 sailors. In addition, up to 5 trainees can be accommodated. The Leeuwins were the first RAN ships to use a multi-crewing concept, with three complements used to operate the two vessels. Both vessels currently operate with a permanent single complement each.

The two ships were ordered from NQEA on 2 April 1996, and built at the company's shipyard in Cairns, Queensland. Construction of Leeuwin commenced in August 1996, and she was launched in July 1997, while Melville was laid down in May 1997 and launched in June 1998. The vessels underwent a joint commissioning ceremony on 27 May 2000. The ships initially bore the pennant numbers "HS 01" and "HS 02" respectively, but these were changed in 2004 to "A 245" and "A 246".

== Operational history ==
Both Leeuwin and Melville are based at HMAS Cairns. They operate in support of the Australian Hydrographic Office.

In late 2001, both ships began operations to supplement patrol forces and counter illegal immigration as part of Operation Relex, in addition to normal surveying duties. The survey ships were selected as they had greater range and seakeeping capabilities that the Fremantle-class patrol boats. In January 2002, Leeuwin and Melville were repainted from white to grey.

== Ships ==
Name	Laid down	Launched	Commissioned	Decommissioned	Status
Leeuwin	30 August 1996	19 July 1997	27 May 2000		Active
Melville	9 May 1997	23 June 1998	27 May 2000	8 August 2024	Retired
