= ATLS-9701 =

US Navy auxiliary ship with advanced communication and navigation

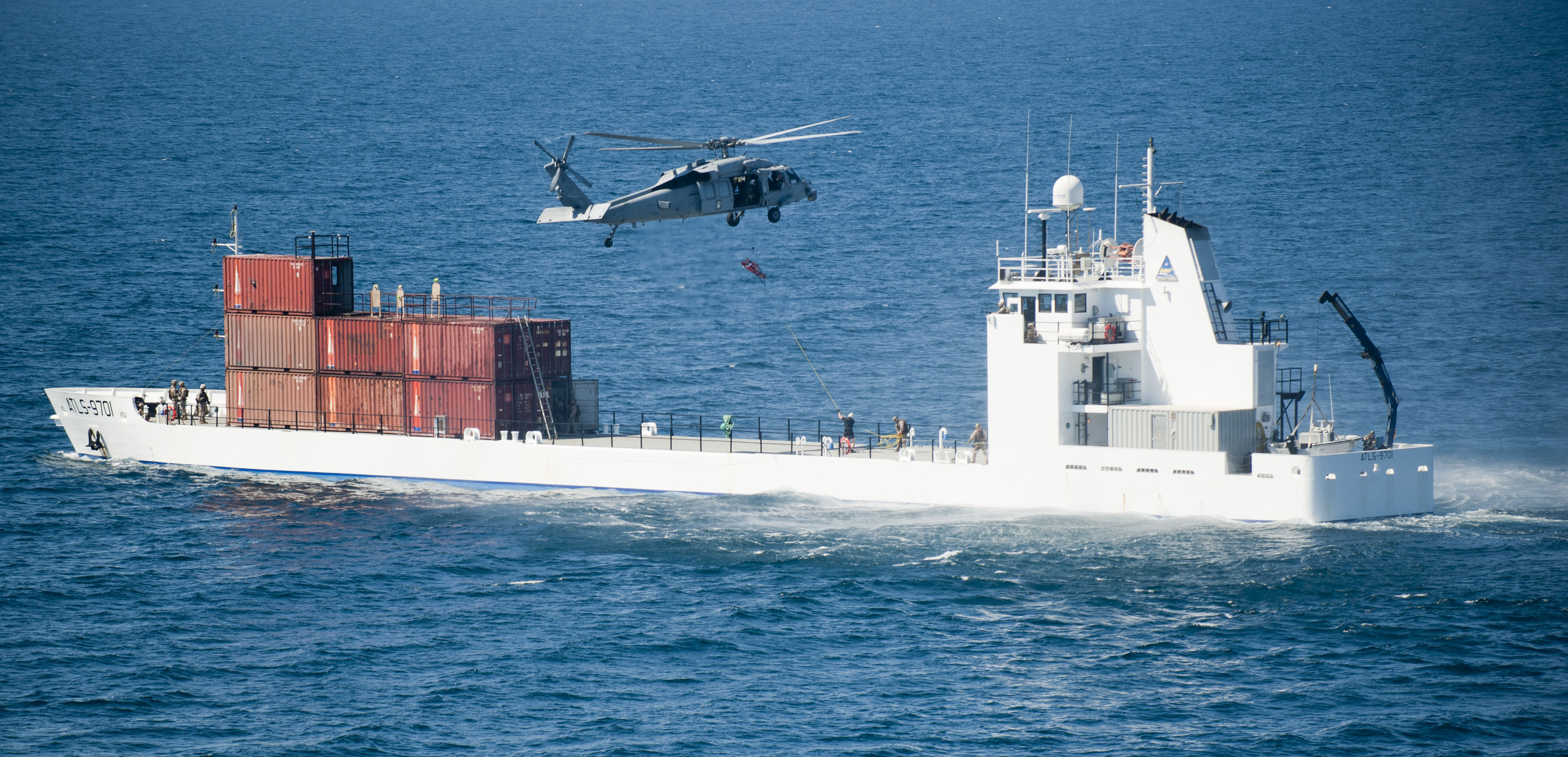
- ATLS-9701 in 2011

History

United States
- Name: None
- Builder: VT Halter Marine Shipbuilder, Moss Point, MS
- Launched: 1998
- In service: 1998-2026
- Out of service: 2025
- Home port: Port Hueneme, Naval Base Ventura County
- Identification: MMSI number: 369970276; Callsign: ATLS
- Status: style="background: #FE7; color:black; vertical-align: middle; text-align: center; " class="table-partial" |Scrapped

General characteristics
- Class & type: aerial target launch ship
- Displacement: 857 t
- Length: 264 ft 5 in (80.6 m)
- Beam: 26 ft (7.9 m)
- Draft: 6 ft 10 in (2.1 m) maximum
- Propulsion: 2 x diesels, 2 shafts, 1,342 bhp
- Speed: 8 knots (15 km/h)
- Range: 1,000 nautical miles (1,900 km)
- Complement: unknown/classified
- Armament: 2 BQM-74 launchers
- Aviation facilities: none

ATLS-9701 was a small unmanned U.S. Navy active service auxiliary Aerial Target Launch Ship operated by the Pacific Targets and Marine Operations Division (PTMO), U.S. Department of the Navy. The ship possesses VHF, UHF, Sat-Phone, NIPR/SIPRNET communication capabilities, equipped with Nobeltec Navigation system, and BQM-74 aerial targets launchers.

== History ==
ATLS-9701 was built in 1998 for MQM-8G Vandal Targets program run by the Naval Air Systems Command. She was used for firing the MQM-8G super-sonic targets simulating cruise missiles, which were reconfigured RIM-8 Talos long-range naval surface-to-air missiles, in order to test the Phalanx and RIM close-range defensive systems deployed by the Navy. MQM-8G's were remote-controlled, non-recoverable vehicles, 36.2 feet in length, 7.3 feet in diameter, and weighing 8,225 pounds.

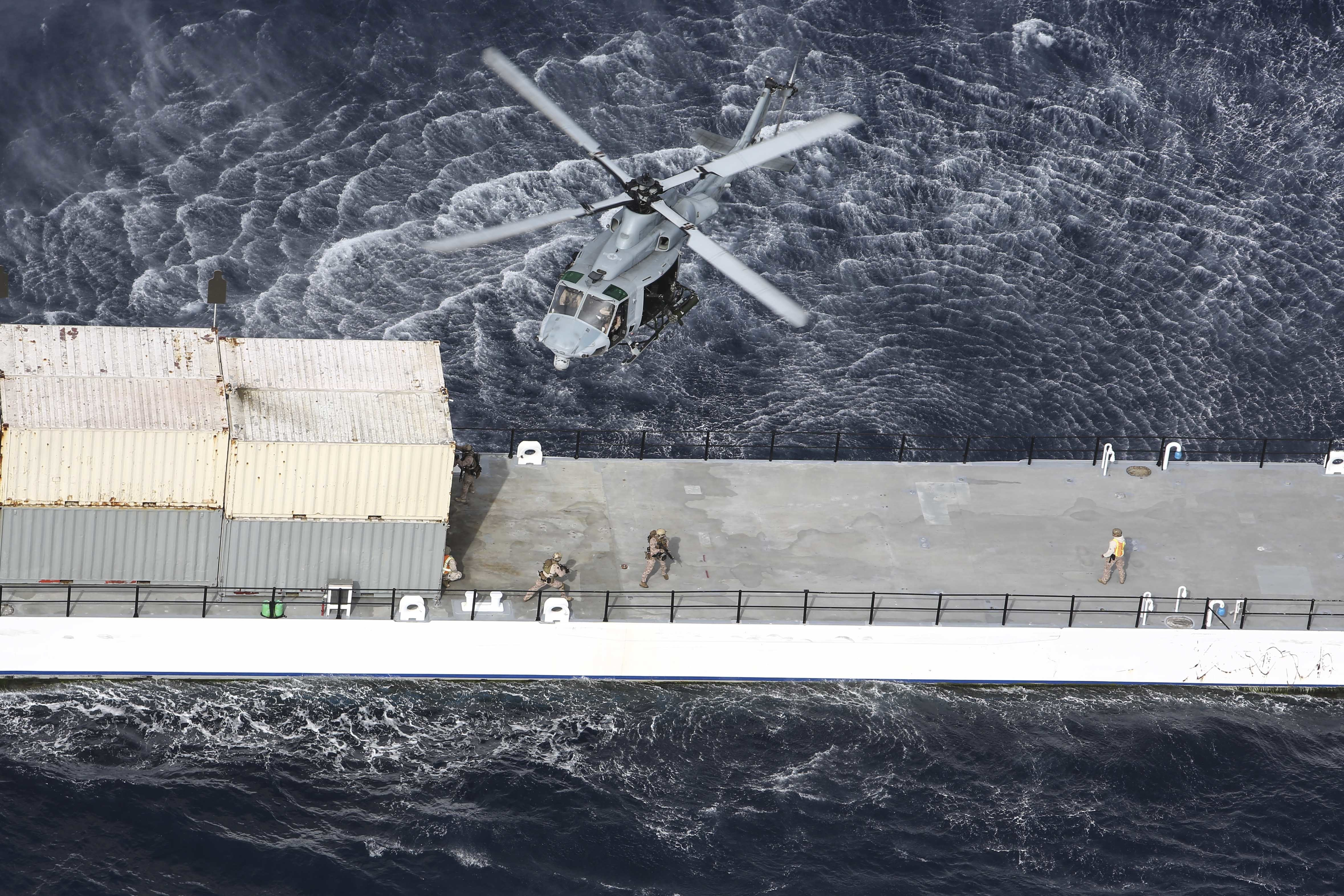
U.S Marines with the 15th Marine Expeditionary Unit's Maritime Raid Force fast-roped from Bell UH-1Y Venom onto the ATLS-9701 to train a VBSS mission

After the last MQM-8 targets were launched in 2005, the ATLS-9701 was converted to firing BQM-74 targets and also became a platform for the U.S. Marine Corps and the U.S. Navy for VBSS maritime training, confined space clearing, on-ship container access, and testing helicopter fast-roping skills, among other activities.

On April 4, 2013, ATLS-9701 was used by the members of the 13th MEU Maritime Raid Force, who fast-roped onto her from a CH-46 helicopter during VBSS training. On January 11, 2015, the 15th MEU Maritime Raid Force exercised their boarding skills on the ATLS-9701 in San Diego Bay during interoperability training.
