= MV Maritime Queen =

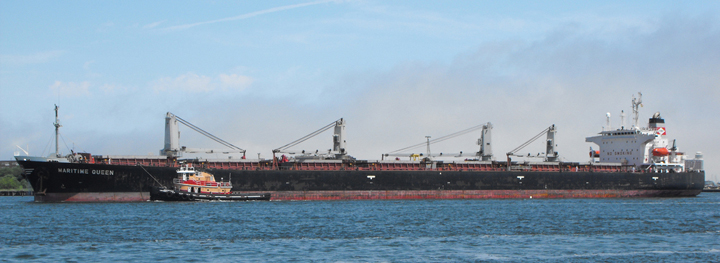

History
- Name: Woody Heart (1998-2008); Maritime Queen (2008-2010); Zenith Royal (2010-)
- Owner: IMC Shipping Limited, Singapore
- Port of registry: Panama (as Woody Heart)
- Builder: Higaki Shipbuilding Co Ltd, Imabari, Japan
- Launched: 23 March 1998
- Identification: IMO number: 9191644; MMSI number: 440164260; Callsign: DSPY9
- Status: Active

General characteristics
- Tonnage: 9,727 DWT; 3,584 NT; 6,448 GT
- Length: 100.33 m (329 ft 2 in)
- Beam: 19.60 m (64 ft 4 in)
- Draught: 8.86 m (29 ft 1 in)
- Propulsion: MAN B&W Diesel 6L35MC, 3,883 kW (5,207 hp) at 210 rpm

MV Maritime Queen (ex-Woody Heart) is a bulk carrier built in 1998.

== History ==
The ship was constructed in 1998 and first named Woody Heart, registered to Bonanza Seiko Sg SA in Panama. In 2008 it was transferred to IMC Group (Singapore) and renamed MV Maritime Queen.

It was further renamed MV Zenith Royal in 2010 and as of February 2024 was registered in South Korea to Han Kook Capital Co Ltd.
