= HMAS Leeuwin (A 245) =

1997 survey vessel of the Royal Australian Navy

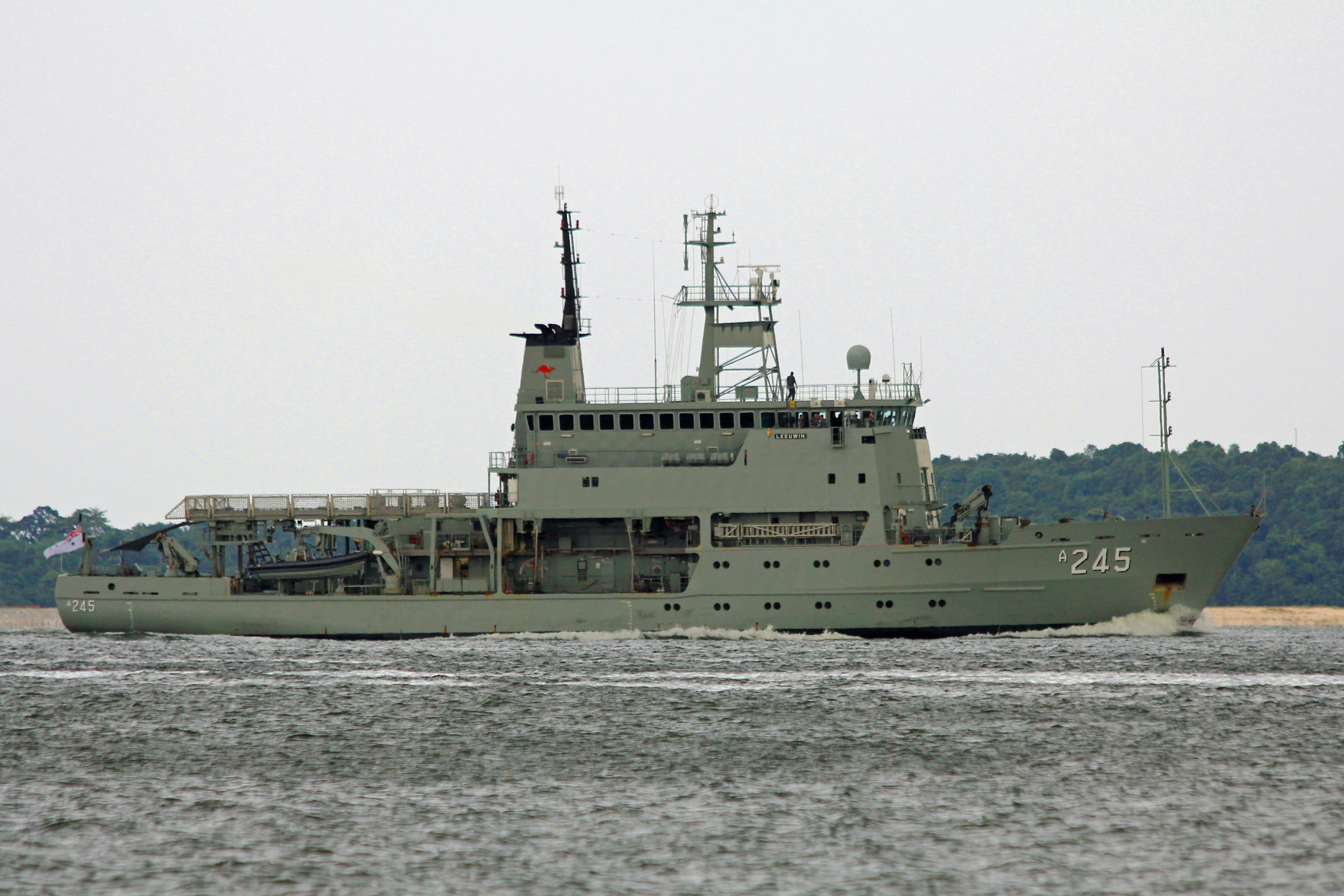
- HMAS Leeuwin operating off Singapore in 2010

History

Australia
- Namesake: Cape Leeuwin
- Ordered: 2 April 1996
- Builder: NQEA, Cairns
- Launched: 19 July 1997
- Commissioned: 27 May 2000
- Home port: HMAS Cairns, Cairns
- Identification: IMO number: 9151773; MMSI number: 503177000; Callsign: VLSE
- Motto: I Shall Maintain
- Status: Active as of 2019
- Badge

General characteristics
- Class & type: Leeuwin-class survey vessel
- Displacement: 2,170 tons
- Length: 71.2 m (234 ft)
- Beam: 15.2 m (50 ft)
- Draught: 4.3 m (14 ft)
- Propulsion: 4 × GEC Alsthom 6RK 215 generators, 2 × Alsthom electric motors, 2 shafts; 1 × Schottel bow thruster
- Speed: 13 knots (24 km/h; 15 mph)
- Range: 18,000 nautical miles (33,000 km; 21,000 mi) at 9 knots (17 km/h; 10 mph)
- Complement: 10 officers, 46 sailors, up to 5 trainees
- Sensors & processing systems: Navigation: STN Atlas 9600 ARPA; I-band.; Sonar: C-Tech CMAS 36/39; hull mounted high frequency active sonar; Atlas Fansweep-20 multibeam echo sounder; Atlas Hydrographic Deso single-beam echo sounder; Klein 2000 towed sidescan sonar array
- Armament: 2 × 12.7 mm machine guns
- Aircraft carried: Not permanently embarked

HMAS Leeuwin (HS 01/A 245) is the lead ship of the Leeuwin-class of hydrographic survey vessels operated by the Royal Australian Navy (RAN).

== Design and construction ==
Leeuwin has a displacement of 2,170 tons at full load. She is 71.2 metres (234 ft) long, with a beam of 15.2 metres (50 ft), and a draught of 4.3 metres (14 ft). Main propulsion machinery consists of four GEC Alsthom 6RK 215 diesel generators, which supply two Alsthom electric motors, each driving a propeller shaft. A Schottel bow thruster is fitted for additional manoeuvrability. Maximum speed is 13 knots (24 km/h; 15 mph), with a range of 18,000 nautical miles (33,000 km; 21,000 mi) at 9 knots (17 km/h; 10 mph).

The sensor suite consists of a STN Atlas 9600 APRA I-band navigational radar, a C-Tech CMAS 36/39 hull-mounted sonar, an Atlas Fansweep-20 multibeam echo sounder, an Atlas Hydrographic Deso single-beam echo sounder, and a Klein 2000 towed sonar. The sonars and echo sounders allow the vessels to chart waters up to 6,000 metres (20,000 ft) deep. There are three sets of davits fitted to carry Fantome-class survey boats. The ship is fitted with a helicopter deck, previously for an AS 350B Squirrel helicopter detached from 723 Squadron, although there are no long-term hosting facilities. She is armed with two single 12.7 mm machine guns. The ship's company consists of 10 officers and 46 sailors, plus up to 5 trainees. The Leeuwin class were the first RAN ships to use a multi-crewing concept, with three complements used to operate the two vessels.

Leeuwin was ordered from NQEA on 2 April 1996, and built at the company's shipyard in Cairns. She was laid down on 9 May 1997 and launched on 23 June 1998. Leeuwin and sister ship Melville underwent a joint commissioning ceremony on 27 May 2000. Leeuwin initially carried the pennant number "HS 01", but this was changed to "A 245" in 2004. She is named after Cape Leeuwin, the south-west-most point of the Australian continent.

== Operational history ==
In late 2001, Leeuwin began to operate in support of border protection operations in addition to her normal hydrographic duties. In January 2002, Leeuwin was repainted from white to grey.

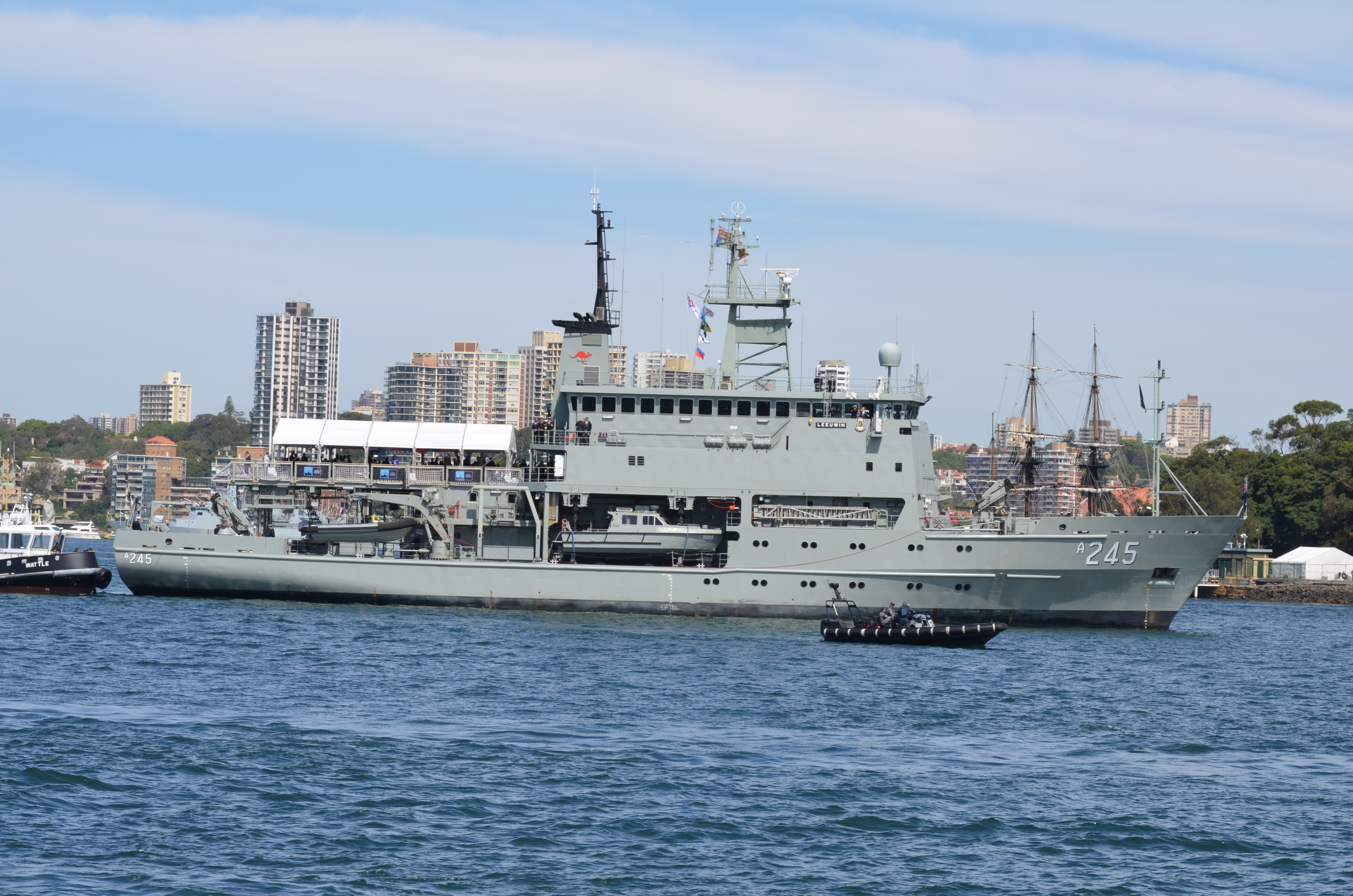
Leeuwin underway on Sydney Harbour on 5 October 2013

In October 2013, Leeuwin participated in the International Fleet Review 2013 in Sydney. The fleet was reviewed by Governor-General Quentin Bryce on 5 October from Leeuwin's helicopter deck, with Bryce accompanied by Prince Harry.

Leeuwin sailed to Fiji in July 2015 for a seabed-mapping operation around Rotuma Island. This was the first RAN deployment to the region in eight years, since the deterioration of ties between the nations after the 2006 Fijian coup d'état.

On 11 October 2026, a recording device was found onboard the women's bathroom. The incident is pending further investigation.
