= Arcticaborg =

Platform supply ship built in 1998

History
- Name: Arcticaborg (Арктикаборг)
- Owner: Wagenborg
- Operator: Wagenborg (1998–2018); Fathom Offshore (2018–2019); Mercury Sakhalin (2019–present)
- Port of registry: Netherlands Antilles (1998–2004); Aktau, Kazakhstan (2004–2017); Willemstad, Curaçao (2017–2018); Edmonton, Canada (2018–2019); Willemstad, Curaçao (2019); Korsakov, Russia (2019–present)
- Ordered: December 1997
- Builder: Kværner Masa-Yards Helsinki New Shipyard, Helsinki, Finland
- Yard number: 496
- Completed: 14 October 1998
- In service: 1998–present
- Identification: IMO number: 9184976; MMSI number: 316037515
- Status: In service

General characteristics
- Type: Platform supply vessel
- Tonnage: 1,453 GT; 454 NT; 675 DWT
- Displacement: 2,043 tons
- Length: 65.10 m (213.6 ft)
- Beam: 16.40 m (53.8 ft)
- Draught: 2.90 m (9.5 ft)
- Depth: 4.40 m (14.4 ft)
- Ice class: RMRS UL
- Installed power: 2 × Wärtsilä 6L26 (2 × 1,950 kW)
- Propulsion: 2 × ABB Azipod VI1100A (2 × 1,620 kW); Bow thruster (150 kW)
- Speed: 13 knots (24 km/h; 15 mph) in open water; 3 knots (5.6 km/h; 3.5 mph) in 60 cm (24 in) ice
- Crew: 12; Accommodation for 20 persons

Arcticaborg (Арктикаборг) is an icebreaking platform supply vessel. She was previously operated by Wagenborg Kazakhstan in the Caspian Sea but was transferred to Canada in 2017 and acquired by Fathom Offshore in 2018. In 2019, she was contract to Russia for two years.

Arcticaborg and her sister ship, Antarcticaborg, were built by Kværner Masa-Yards in Helsinki, Finland, in 1998. They are the first full developments of the double acting ship concept and among the first icebreakers equipped with Azipods, electric azimuth thrusters manufactured by ABB.

== Design ==
=== General characteristics ===
The 2,043-ton Arcticaborg is 65.10 metres (213.6 ft) long and has a beam of 16.40 metres (53.8 ft). Designed to operate in shallow waters with a maximum depth of 5 metres (16 ft), her maximum operating draught is only 2.90 metres (9.5 ft). Furthermore, her main dimensions were limited by the Russian inland waterways which had to be used to transport the ships to the Caspian Sea. The gross tonnage of Arcticaborg is 1,453, net tonnage 454, and deadweight tonnage 675 tons. The ship is served by a crew of 12 and has accommodation for 20.

Being a supply ship, Arcticaborg is equipped to carry a wide range of goods needed on the offshore platform. The ship has a 350 m^{2} (3,800 sq ft) open aft decks for dry cargo and a cargo hold which has a hatch large enough the fit a twenty-foot container. For powderized goods such as cement and barite, Arcticaborg has five storage silos with a combined capacity of 51 m^{3} (1,800 cu ft). Furthermore, the ship has cargo tanks for 48 m^{3} (1,700 cu ft) of liquid drilling mud, 363 m^{3} (12,800 cu ft) of fuel, and 278 m^{3} (9,800 cu ft) of fresh water. On her way back from the platform, Arcticaborg was designed to carry 67 m^{3} (2,400 cu ft) of sewage and wastewater. It is also equipped for firefighting, pollution control and rescue operations, and has towing and anchor handling equipment.

Arcticaborg was initially classified by Russian Maritime Register of Shipping with ice class UL, equivalent to the highest Finnish-Swedish ice class, 1A Super. However, the actual level of ice strengthening far exceeds the requirements of the ice class notations.

=== Power and propulsion ===
Arcticaborg has a diesel-electric powertrain with two six-cylinder Wärtsilä 6L26 4-stroke medium-speed diesel engines, each with a maximum continuous rating of 1,950 kilowatts (2,610 hp), driving van Kaick DGS generators rated 2,250 kVA at 690 V. According to the power plant principle, the main generators in the forward engine room provide electrical power for all shipboard consumers, including propulsion. For emergency and harbour use, the ship also has Valmet 612 diesel engines, rated at 130 kilowatts (170 hp), coupled to 163 kVA alternators. Arcticaborg is propelled by two ABB Azipod VI1100A electric azimuth thrusters rated at 1,620 kW each. Arcticaborg was among the first icebreakers fitted with Azipod units that allow the ship to operate astern in heavy ice conditions with excellent maneuverability. In addition the ship has one 150 kW bow thruster for harbour operations.

Arcticaborg is capable of breaking level ice up to 60 centimetres (24 in) thick at 3 knots (5.6 km/h; 3.5 mph) when moving ahead. However, the bow is designed primarily with good seakeeping and open water characteristics in mind, and in heavy ice conditions the ship is turned around and operated stern first. In such way, her icebreaking capability increases to 1 metre (3.3 ft) of level ice. More importantly, by allowing the Azipod units to mill and crush the ice, Arcticaborg is able to penetrate ice ridges that are thicker than the draught of the ship and sometimes reach the seabed without having to rely on backing and ramming. Her service speed in open water is 13 knots (24 km/h; 15 mph) and bollard pull 32 tons.

In addition to the four Azipod units installed on Arcticaborg and her sister ship, ABB delivered a fifth spare unit, which allowed the company to carry out a complete overhaul for all propulsors, one at a time, without having to dock the ships for extended periods.

== Career ==
Arcticaborg and Antarcticaborg were ordered from Kværner Masa-Yards Helsinki New Shipyard in December 1997 following extensive research and model testing at the company's Arctic Technology Centre, nowadays known as Aker Arctic. Constructed in the covered dry dock at the same time, both ships were delivered to Wagenborg Kazakhstan BV, a subsidiary of the Dutch shipping company Wagenborg Shipping, within a week in October 1998 and sailed from Finland through the Mediterranean to the Black Sea and finally to the Caspian Sea through rivers Don and Volga. The final ice trials were conducted in the following spring. The ships were placed under long-term charter by Offshore Kazakhstan International Operating Company (OKIOC), a consortium which includes Royal Dutch Shell. Although initially classified by Bureau Veritas and flying the Dutch flag, the ships were reclassified by the Russian Maritime Register of Shipping and their port of registry was changed to Aktau, Kazakhstan, shortly after delivery.

Following the discovery of the Kashagan Field in July 2000, Arcticaborg and Antarcticaborg began operating for Agip KCO in the Northern Caspian Sea where the water depth is only 4–7 metres (13–23 ft) and the ice conditions are particularly difficult. In 2000, dedicated ice-strengthened barges, pushed or towed by the icebreaking supply ships, were developed and constructed to allow uninterrupted cargo transportation to and from the platforms year round.

In May 2017, Royal Wagenborg was awarded a five-year contract for icebreaking and other services in the Canadian Arctic. The company relocated Arcticaborg from the Caspian Sea to Vancouver via the Northwest Passage. The ownership of Arcticaborg was retained by Wagenborg; the vessel is on a bareboat charter to Fathom Offshore.

In August 2019, Arcticaborg left Canada for a two-year contract in Russia. As of 2020, the vessel is operated by Mercury Sakhalin in the Sakhalin oil fields under the Russian flag.
