= HMAS Melville (A 246) =

Australian hydrographic survey vessel (2000–2024)

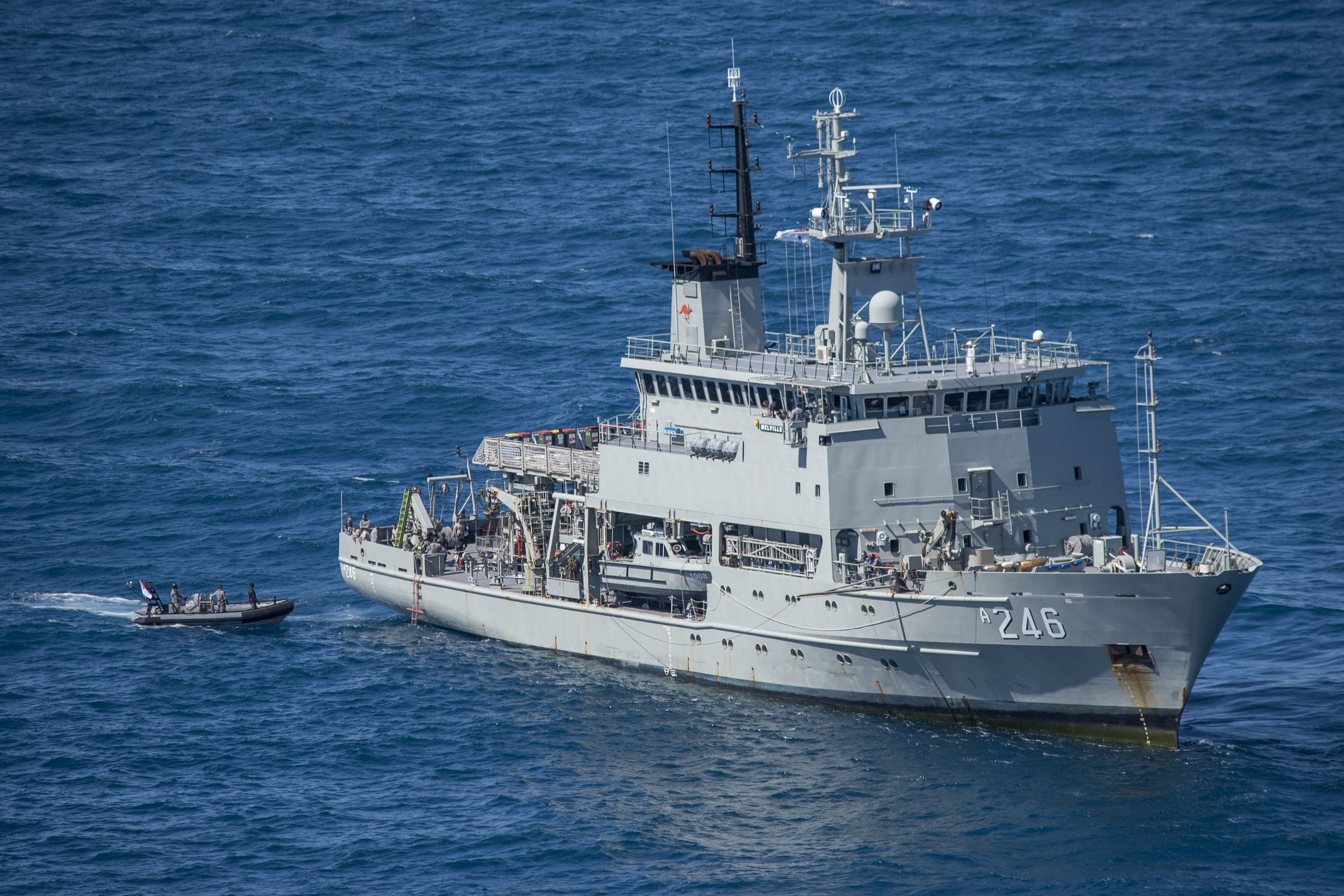
- HMAS Melville in 2017

History

Australia
- Namesake: Melville Island
- Ordered: 02 April 1996
- Builder: NQEA, Cairns
- Laid down: 09 May 1997
- Launched: 23 June 1998
- Commissioned: 27 May 2000
- Decommissioned: 08 August 2024
- Home port: HMAS Cairns, Cairns
- Identification: IMO number: 9151785; MMSI number: 503178000
- Motto: "With Determination"
- Honours and awards: Meritorious Unit Commendation (United States)
- Status: Decommissioned 08 August 2024

General characteristics
- Type: Leeuwin-class survey vessel
- Displacement: 2,170 tons
- Length: 71.2 m (234 ft)
- Beam: 15.2 m (50 ft)
- Draught: 4.3 m (14 ft)
- Propulsion: 4 × GEC Alsthom 6RK 215 generators, 2 × Alsthom electric motors, 2 shafts; 1 × Schottel bow thruster
- Speed: 13 knots (24 km/h; 15 mph)
- Range: 18,000 nautical miles (33,000 km; 21,000 mi) at 9 knots (17 km/h; 10 mph)
- Complement: 10 officers, 46 sailors, up to 5 trainees
- Sensors & processing systems: Navigation: STN Atlas 9600 ARPA; I-band.; Sonar: C-Tech CMAS 36/39; hull mounted high frequency active sonar; Atlas Fansweep-20 multibeam echo sounder; Atlas Hydrographic Deso single-beam echo sounder; Klein 2000 towed sidescan sonar array
- Armament: 2 × 12.7 mm machine guns
- Aircraft carried: Not permanently embarked

HMAS Melville (HS 02/A 246) is the second ship of the Leeuwin class of hydrographic survey vessels operated by the Royal Australian Navy (RAN). The ship was decommissioned on 8 August 2024.

== Design and construction ==
Melville has a displacement of 2,170 tons at full load. She is 71.2 metres (234 ft) long, with a beam of 15.2 metres (50 ft), and a draught of 4.3 metres (14 ft). Main propulsion machinery consists of four GEC Alsthom 6RK 215 diesel generators, which supply two Alsthom electric motors, each driving a propeller shaft. A Schottel bow thruster is fitted for additional manoeuvrability. Maximum speed is 13 knots (24 km/h; 15 mph), with a range of 18,000 nautical miles (33,000 km; 21,000 mi) at 9 knots (17 km/h; 10 mph).

The sensor suite consists of a STN Atlas 9600 APRA I-band navigational radar, a C-Tech CMAS 36/39 hull-mounted sonar, an Atlas Fansweep-20 multibeam echo sounder, an Atlas Hydrographic Deso single-beam echo sounder, and a Klein 2000 towed sonar. The sonars and echo sounders allow the vessels to chart waters up to 6,000 metres (20,000 ft) deep. There are three sets of davits fitted to carry Fantome-class survey boats. The ship is fitted with a helicopter deck, previously for an AS 350B Squirrel helicopter detached from 723 Squadron, although there are no long-term hosting facilities. She is armed with two single 12.7 mm machine guns. The ship's company consists of 10 officers and 46 sailors, plus up to 5 trainees. The Leeuwin class were the first RAN ships to use a multi-crewing concept, with three complements used to operate the two vessels.

Melville was ordered from NQEA on 2 April 1996, and built at the company's shipyard in Cairns. She was laid down on 9 May 1997 and launched on 23 June 1998. Melville and sister ship Leeuwin underwent a joint commissioning ceremony on 27 May 2000. Melville initially carried the pennant number "HS 02", but this was changed to "A 246" in 2004. She is named after Melville Island, located to the north of Darwin.

== Operational history ==
In late 2001, Melville began to operate in support of border protection operations in addition to her normal hydrographic duties. In January 2002, Melville was repainted from white to grey.

In June 2003, Melville was sent to south Queensland to inspect the believed wreck location of the Australian Hospital Ship Centaur, which had been torpedoed off Moreton Island during World War II. This had been prompted by several media reports that the wreck was unlikely to be Centaur, and had been wrongly classified since its discovery in 1995. Following up on surveys conducted by the minehunters Hawkesbury and Yarra a month previous, the efforts of Melville confirmed that the shipwreck was not the hospital ship.

In March 2017, Melville was sent to North Queensland after tropical Cyclone Debbie. Its task was to assist in humanitarian operations consisting of clean up, community assistance and to provide basic provisions such as food and water.

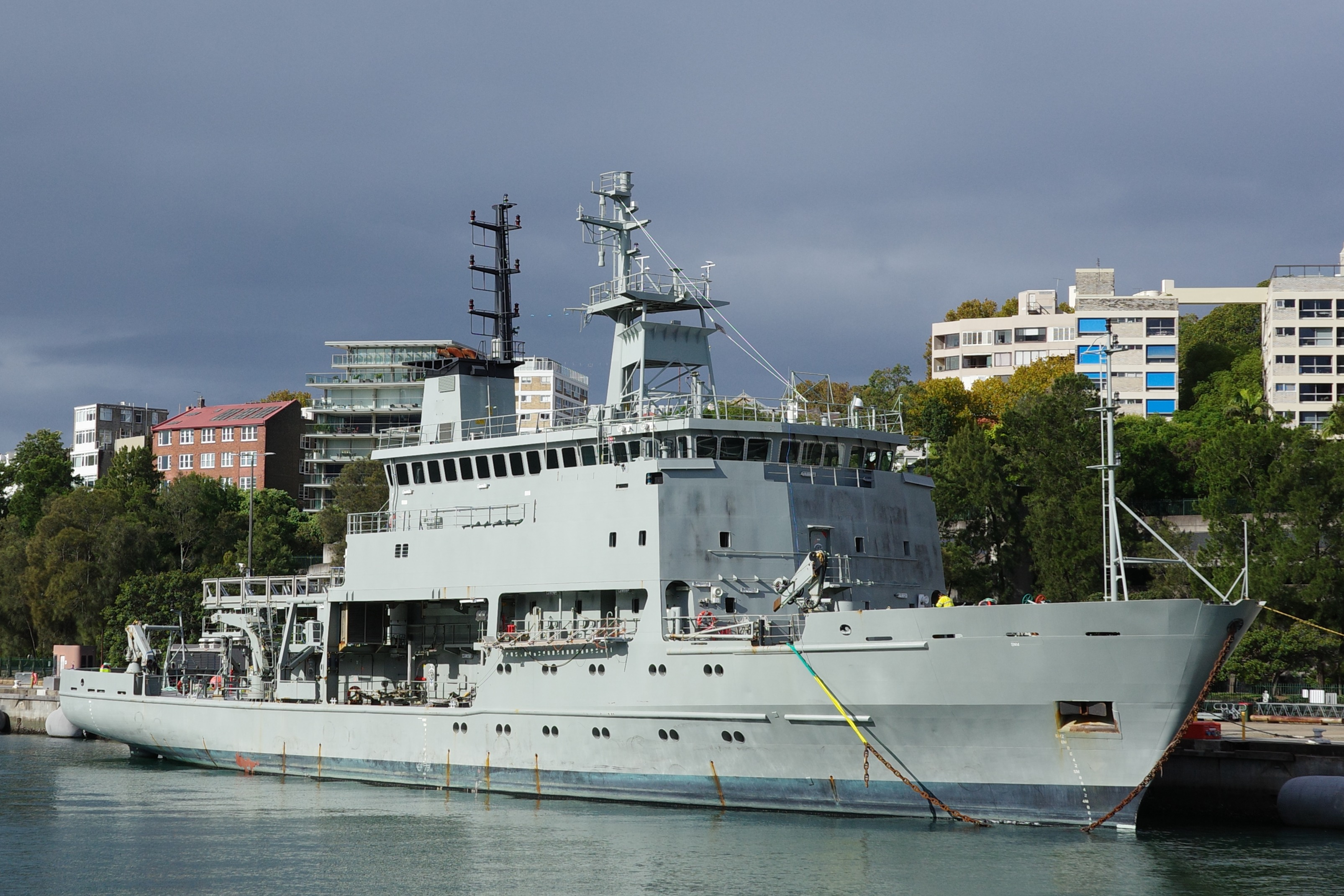
The former HMAS Melville in 2026

In August 2017, Melville was deployed to Shoalwater Bay, approximately 30 kilometres off the coast of Queensland, tasked with assisting the search for a crashed United States Marine Corps MV-22 Osprey tilt-rotor aircraft. A Royal Australian Navy clearance diving team was also utilised to search the wreck for three missing members of the aircrew and United States Marines from the III Marine Expeditionary Force (III MEF), and to assist in the US led operation to recover the aircraft. On 29 January 2018, HMAS Melville was awarded a Meritorious Unit Commendation by the United States Marine Corps.

She was decommissioned in August 2024.
