= Fantome-class survey motor boat =

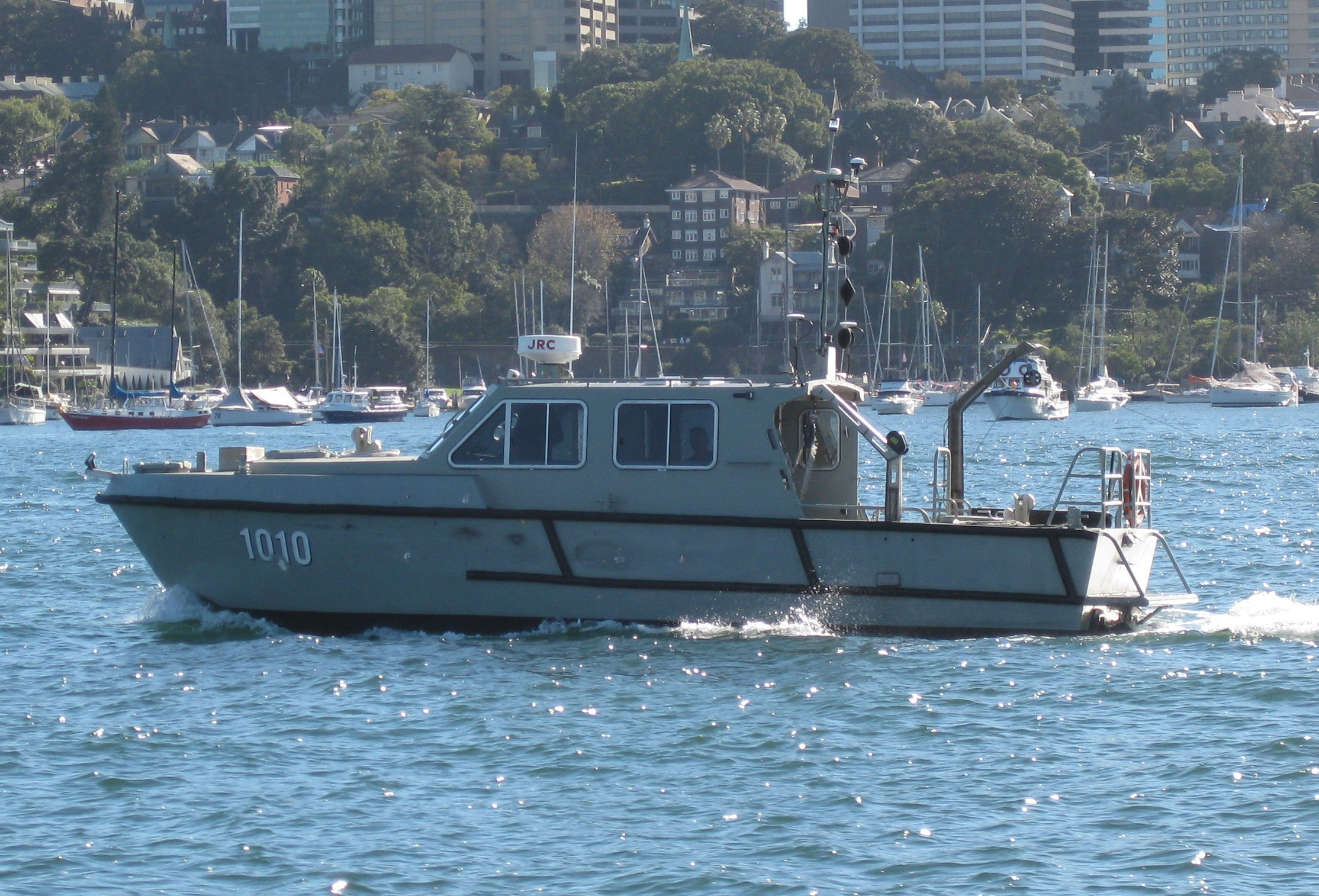
- John Gowland on Sydney Harbour in 2010

Class overview
- Name: Fantome class
- Builders: Pro Marine, Seaford, Victoria
- Operators: Royal Australian Navy; DMS Maritime
- In service: October 1992 – present
- Completed: 8
- Active: 8

General characteristics
- Type: Survey motor boat
- Displacement: 7.48 tons
- Length: 10.7 m (35 ft)
- Beam: 2.9 m (9.5 ft)
- Draught: 0.6 m (2.0 ft)
- Propulsion: 2 × Volvo Penta AQAD 41D/SP290 diesels; 2 outdrives
- Speed: 28 knots (52 km/h; 32 mph)
- Crew: 1 officer, 3 enlisted
- Sensors & processing systems: 1 × JRC JMA-2141 navigation radar; STN Atlas Elektronik Deso 22 echo sounder; Can carry portable side-scan mapping sonars

The Fantome class is a class of eight small survey motor boats (SMBs) operated by the Royal Australian Navy (RAN) and DMS Maritime. The four-man boats are designed to operate from the Leeuwin-class survey vessels, with three assigned to each ship, while the seventh and eighth were attached to the RAN Hydrographic School at HMAS Penguin. They are fitted with navigational and survey equipment and are unarmed.

== Design and construction ==
Each Fantome-class vessel displaces 7.48 tons, is 10.7 metres (35 ft) long, has a beam of 2.9 metres (9.5 ft), and a draught of 0.6 metres (2.0 ft). They are fitted with two Volvo Penta AQAD 41D/SP290 diesels, connected to two outdrives, which allow the vessels to reach 28 knots (52 km/h; 32 mph). They are fitted with a JRC JMA-2141 navigation radar and SMBs on the Hydrographic Ships have Atlas Deso 30 single beam echo sounders, MBES Fansweep 20 multibeam echosounders and CMAX TLW Side Scan Sonar. They are also fitted with Fugro Seastar 3100 WAdGPS for horizontal positioning and POSMV as the position monitoring system. Four personnel crew each vessel; one officer/senior sailor and three sailors. The Fantome SMBs are unarmed.

All eight vessels were constructed by Pro Marine at Seaford, Victoria. They entered service between October 1992 and July 1993.

The Fantome design was used as the basis for the Antarctic survey launch ASV Wyatt Earp.

== Operations ==
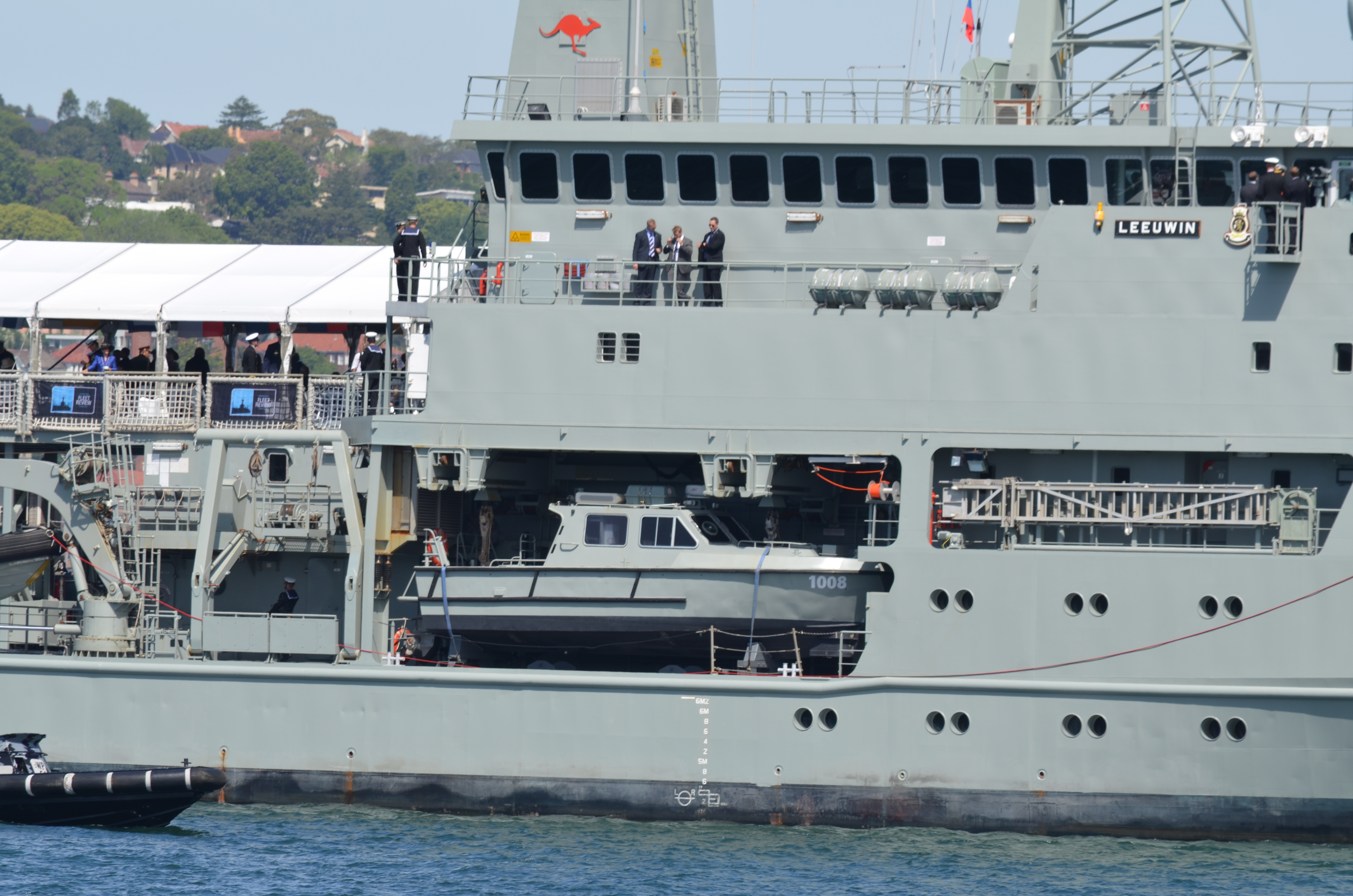
Duyfken embarked on HMAS Leeuwin in October 2013

Six of the RAN's Fantome-class boats are carried on board its two Leeuwin-class survey vessels. Each of these ships can carry three survey motor boats. The other two boats were originally operated by DMS Marine under contract to the RAN and are stationed at the Navy's Hydrographic School at HMAS Penguin in Sydney, but by 2010, these vessels were under direct RAN control. DMS Maritime maintains all eight boats.

== Vessels ==
The nine boats are:

- SMB 1005 Investigator [Taken out of service 2001]
- SMB 1006 Fantome
- SMB 1007 Meda
- SMB 1008 Duyfken
- SMB 1009 Tom Thumb
- SMB 1010 John Gowland
- SMB 1011 Geographe
- SMB 1012 Casuarina
- SMB 1021 Condor is not a "Fantome" class SMB but a one off unsuccessful design that incorporates a single forward mounted engine with a single shaft and was never accepted into RAN service because of its poor layout and handling capabilities.

Feed back from RAN crews was that it was difficult to drive and lacked performance leading to the "Leeuwin" class of Hydrographic vessels to have to slow down to enable recovery of the vessel.

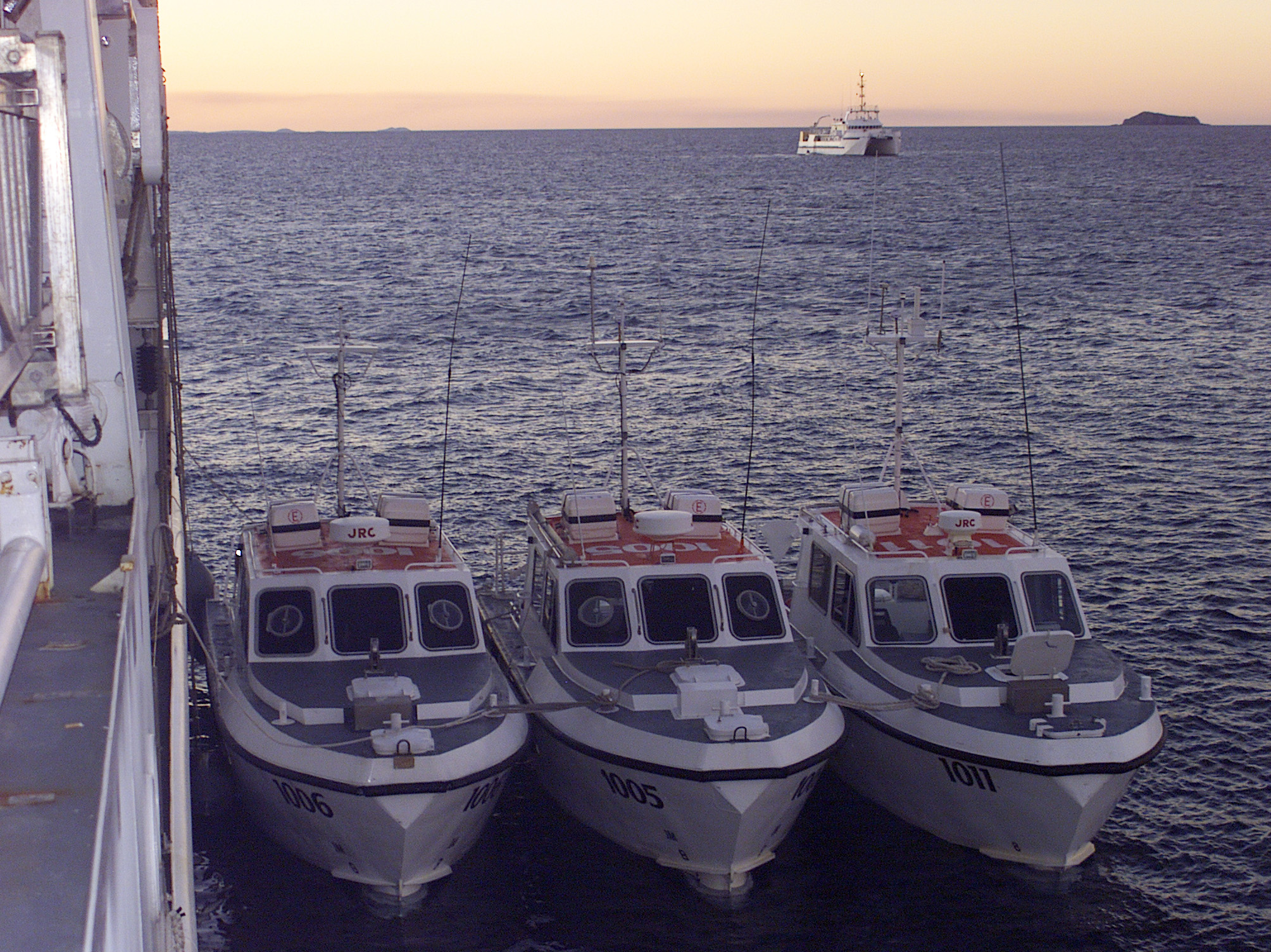
Fantome-class boats (left to right) Meda, Investigator, and Geographe rafted up to HMAS Leeuwin in May 2001

Fantome, John Gowland and Casuarina were seen being auctioned July 23 at https://www.pickles.com.au/trucks/item/search/-/listing/listSaleItems/3877#!/search-result?q=ProductType.Boats.&sort=lot_number_suffix_sequence
