= HMAS Cessnock (J175) =

1941 Bathurst-class corvette

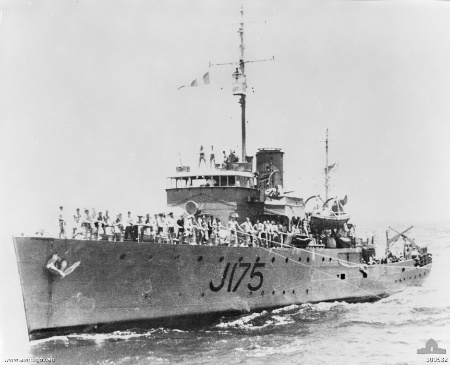
- HMAS Cessnock c. 1942

History

Australia
- Namesake: City of Cessnock, New South Wales
- Builder: Cockatoo Docks and Engineering Company
- Laid down: 16 April 1941
- Launched: 17 October 1941
- Commissioned: 26 January 1942
- Decommissioned: 12 July 1946
- Motto: "No Steps Backward"
- Honours and awards: Battle honours: Pacific 1942; New Guinea 1942; Indian Ocean 1942–45; Sicily 1943
- Fate: Sold for scrap in 1947
- Badge

General characteristics
- Class & type: Bathurst-class corvette
- Displacement: 650 tons (standard), 1,025 tons (full war load)
- Length: 186 ft (57 m)
- Beam: 31 ft (9.4 m)
- Draught: 8.5 ft (2.6 m)
- Propulsion: Triple expansion, 2 shafts, 1,750 hp
- Speed: 15 knots (28 km/h; 17 mph)
- Complement: 85
- Armament: 1 × 4 inch Mk XIX gun, 3 × Oerlikon 20 mm cannons (later 2), 1 Bofors 40 mm L/60 gun (installed later), various machine guns and small arms, Depth charge chutes and throwers

HMAS Cessnock (J175/B240/A114), named for the town of Cessnock, New South Wales, was one of 60 Bathurst-class corvettes constructed during World War II and one of 20 built for the Admiralty but manned by personnel of and commissioned into the Royal Australian Navy (RAN).

== Design and construction ==
In 1938, the Australian Commonwealth Naval Board (ACNB) identified the need for a general purpose 'local defence vessel' capable of both anti-submarine and mine-warfare duties, while easy to construct and operate. The vessel was initially envisaged as having a displacement of approximately 500 tons, a speed of at least 10 knots (19 km/h; 12 mph), and a range of 2,000 nautical miles (3,700 km; 2,300 mi) The opportunity to build a prototype in the place of a cancelled Bar-class boom defence vessel saw the proposed design increased to a 680-ton vessel, with a 15.5 knots (28.7 km/h; 17.8 mph) top speed, and a range of 2,850 nautical miles (5,280 km; 3,280 mi), armed with a 4 inch Mk XIX gun, equipped with asdic, and able to fitted with either depth charges or minesweeping equipment depending on the planned operations: although closer in size to a sloop than a local defence vessel, the resulting increased capabilities were accepted due to advantages over British-designed mine warfare and anti-submarine vessels. Construction of the prototype HMAS Kangaroo did not go ahead, but the plans were retained. The need for locally built 'all-rounder' vessels at the start of World War II saw the "Australian Minesweepers" (designated as such to hide their anti-submarine capability, but popularly referred to as "corvettes") approved in September 1939, with 60 constructed during the course of the war: 36 ordered by the RAN, 20 (including Cessnock) ordered by the British Admiralty but manned and commissioned as RAN vessels, and 4 for the Royal Indian Navy.

Cessnock was laid down by Cockatoo Docks and Engineering at Sydney, New South Wales on 16 April 1941. She was launched on 17 October 1941 by Lady Gordon, wife of Sir Thomas Gordon, a director of the constructing firm, and commissioned on 26 January 1942.

== Operational history ==
After a period of working up, Cessnock commenced duty as an escort vessel and escorted Allied shipping travelling between Townsville and New Guinea until September 1942. Cessnock was then assigned as an anti-submarine patrol ship operating in Western Australian waters from October until November 1942, when she was assigned to the British Eastern Fleet and based in Kenya.

Cessnock escorted Allied convoys in the Indian Ocean and Mediterranean Sea during 1943 and 1944. In January 1945 she returned to Australia and became part of the British Pacific Fleet in February. The ship operated as an escort in the Pacific until the end of the war.

Cessnock was present in Tokyo Bay on Victory over Japan Day (2 September 1945), when the Japanese Instrument of Surrender was signed.

Four battle honours were awarded to Cessnock for her wartime service: "Pacific 1942", "New Guinea 1942", "Indian Ocean 1942–45", and "Sicily 1943".

== Fate ==
Cessnock paid off on 12 July 1946 and was sold for scrap to the Nan Chiao Shipping and Salvage Company of Shanghai, China on 23 April 1947.
