= List of ship decommissionings in 2006 =

The list of ship decommissionings in 2006 includes a chronological list of all ships decommissioned in 2006.

| | Operator | Ship | Flag | Class and type | Fate | Other notes |
|---|---|---|---|---|---|---|
| 24 February | Royal Navy | Grey Rover | | Rover-class tanker | Scrapped in Liverpool 2009/2011 | |
| 26 February | Royal Australian Navy | Wollongong | | Fremantle-class patrol boat | | |
| 31 March | Royal Navy | Grafton | | Type 23 frigate | Sold to Chile | |
| 31 March | Italian Navy | Alpino | | Alpino-class frigate | | |
| 8 July | Royal Australian Navy | Gawler | | Fremantle-class patrol boat | Awaiting disposal | |
| 8 July | Royal Australian Navy | Geelong | | Fremantle-class patrol boat | Awaiting disposal | |
| 11 August | Chilean Navy | Capitán Prat | | County-class destroyer | | |
| 11 August | Chilean Navy | Ministro Zenteno | | Leander-class frigate | | |
| 11 August | Royal Australian Navy | Fremantle | | Fremantle-class patrol boat | Awaiting disposal | |
| 12 September | Royal Navy | Sovereign | | Swiftsure-class submarine | Awaiting disposal | |
| 16 September | Royal Australian Navy | Westralia | | Leaf-class tanker | Sold | renamed Shiraz, converted to FPSO vessel |
| 22 September | Chilean Navy | Almirante Cochrane | | County-class destroyer | | Last County class to be decommissioned |
