= Fremantle (surname) =

Fremantle is a surname.

Notable people with the surname include:

== Persons ==
- Arthur Fremantle (1835–1901), British soldier and American Civil War diarist
- Charles Fremantle (1800–1869), British captain of the first ship to arrive at the Swan River, Western Australia, in 1829 to establish a colony
- Charles William Fremantle (1834–1914), British government official
- Edmund Fremantle (1836–1929), British Navy officer
- Elizabeth Wynne Fremantle (1778–1857), British diarist and wife of Admiral Thomas Fremantle
- Francesca Fremantle, scholar and translator of Sanskrit
- Henry Fremantle (1874–1931), South African politician
- John Fremantle (disambiguation)
  - John Fremantle, 4th Baron Cottesloe (1900–1994), World War II soldier and businessman
  - John Fremantle, 5th Baron Cottesloe (b. 1927), Commander of the Royal Navy
- Katharine Fremantle (1919–2018), art historian and academic
- Sydney Fremantle (1867–1958), Admiral of the Royal Navy
- Thomas Fremantle (disambiguation)
  - Thomas Fremantle (Royal Navy officer) (1765–1819), Admiral of the Royal Navy
  - Thomas Fremantle, 1st Baron Cottesloe (1798–1890) British politician
  - Thomas Fremantle, 2nd Baron Cottesloe (1830–1918), British businessman and Conservative politician
  - Thomas Fremantle, 3rd Baron Cottesloe (1862–1956), Australian army officer
- William Fremantle (disambiguation)
  - William Fremantle (politician) (1766–1850), British politician
  - William Fremantle (uncle) (1807–1895), Dean of Ripon, brother of the 1st Lord Cottesloe
  - William Fremantle (nephew) (1831–1916), Dean of Ripon, son of the 1st Lord Cottesloe

== Titled ==
- Fremantle baronets of the British aristocracy
- Baron Fremantle of the Austrian Empire

== See also ==
- Freemantle (surname)
- Fremantle (disambiguation)
