= Whyalla (disambiguation) =

Whyalla is a city in South Australia.

Whyalla may also refer to:

== Places in South Australia ==
- Whyalla Airport
- Whyalla Conservation Park, a protected area
- Whyalla High School, a high school
- Whyalla railway line
- Whyalla railway station, a former railway station
- Whyalla Steelworks
- City of Whyalla, a local government area
- Electoral district of Whyalla, a former state electoral district

== Ships ==
- HMAS Whyalla
  - HMAS Whyalla (FCPB 208), a patrol boat
  - HMAS Whyalla (J153), a corvette

== Organisations in South Australia ==
- Whyalla Croatia, a soccer club
- Whyalla Football League, Australian rules football competition
