= Fremantle (disambiguation) =

Fremantle is a port city proclaimed in 1929 in Western Australia.

Fremantle or Freemantle, may also refer to:

== Places ==
=== Australia ===
- Places related to Fremantle, the port city of Perth, the capital of Western Australia, Australia
  - City of Fremantle, a local government area (LGA)
  - Fremantle (suburb), a suburb in the LGA called City of Fremantle
  - Division of Fremantle, a federal division of the Australian House of Representatives
  - Electoral district of Fremantle, a state lower house electoral district
  - Electoral district of Fremantle (Legislative Council), a former electorate
  - Fremantle Harbour, the port of Fremantle
  - Fremantle Prison, in Fremantle, Western Australia
- Fremantle Peak, Heard Island, Heard Island and McDonald Islands, Southern Ocean (Indian Ocean)

=== United Kingdom ===
- Freemantle, a suburb and electoral ward of Southampton, a city in Hampshire, United Kingdom

== People and characters ==
- Fremantle (surname), including a list of people
- Freemantle (surname), including a list of persons and characters
- Fremantle baronets of the British aristocracy
- Baron Fremantle of the Austrian Empire

== Transportation and vehicles ==
- Fairey Fremantle, a British seaplane of the 1920s
- Fremantle-class patrol boat, class of 15 Australian patrol boats in service from 1979 to 2007
- HMAS Fremantle, two ships of the Royal Australian Navy
- Fremantle Highway, Japanese RO-RO car carrier ship that burned in 2023

== Groups, companies, organizations ==
- Fremantle Football Club, an Australian Football League team also known as the '"Fremantle Dockers"', based in Fremantle, Western Australia, Australia
- Freemantle F.C., a now defunct English football club, based in Freemantle, Southampton, England, UK
- Fremantle (company), a multi-national media corporation producing many major TV shows, formerly known as FremantleMedia
  - Fremantle Australia, an Australian production and entertainment company of Fremantle

== Other uses ==
- Fremantle, the code name for Maemo 5, a mobile Linux distribution developed by Nokia for the N900 phone

== See also ==
- Fremantle Doctor, the local sea breeze for Perth, Western Australia
- Fremantle Football Club (disambiguation)
