= Launceston =

Launceston may refer to:

== Places ==
- Launceston, Cornwall, a town, ancient borough, and civil parish in Cornwall, England, United Kingdom
  - Launceston (UK Parliament constituency), a former parliamentary constituency in Cornwall
- Launceston, Tasmania, a city in the north of Tasmania, Australia
  - City of Launceston (also Launceston City Council), a local government body in Tasmania
  - Electoral division of Launceston
- Launceston Airport, a regional airport on the outskirts of Launceston, Tasmania
- Tarrant Launceston, a small village and civil parish in north Dorset, England

== Ships ==
- HMS Launceston, two Royal Navy ships
- HMAS Launceston (ACPB 94), an Armidale-class patrol boat of the Royal Australian Navy
- HMAS Launceston (FCPB 207), a Fremantle-class patrol boat of the Royal Australian Navy
- HMAS Launceston (J179), one of 60 Bathurst-class corvettes constructed during World War II

== Sport ==
- Launceston F.C., football club based in Launceston, Cornwall
- Launceston Rugby Club, rugby club based in Launceston, Cornwall
- Launceston United SC, soccer club based in Launceston, Tasmania

== Other uses ==
- Launceston Elliot (1874–1930), a Scottish weightlifter
- Launceston Hotel, the former name of the Grace Emily, a pub in Adelaide, Australia
- Viscount Launceston, a peerage title
