= HMAS Warrnambool =

Two ships of the Royal Australian Navy have been named HMAS Warrnambool, for the city of Warrnambool, Victoria.

- HMAS Warrnambool (J202), a Bathurst-class corvette launched in 1941 and lost in 1947 after striking a naval mine
- HMAS Warrnambool (FCPB 204), a Fremantle-class patrol boat launched in 1980 and decommissioned in 2005

== Battle honours ==
Ships named HMAS Warrnambool are entitled to carry three battle honours:

- Darwin 1942
- Pacific 1942–45
- New Guinea 1942
