= Geraldton (disambiguation) =

Geraldton may refer to:

- Geraldton, a port city 420 kilometres (260 mi) north of Perth, Western Australia
  - Geraldton (suburb), the central suburb of the City of Greater Geraldton
  - City of Greater Geraldton, the local government authority responsible for Geraldton
  - City of Geraldton-Greenough, the former LGA (2007–2011)
  - City of Geraldton, an earlier LGA (1988–2007)
  - Electoral district of Geraldton, a district of the Western Australian Legislative Assembly centred on the city
- Geraldton, Ontario
- Innisfail, Queensland was known as Geraldton until 1910.
- HMAS Geraldton, two ships of the Royal Australian Navy
