= HMAS Gawler =

Two ships of the Royal Australian Navy have been named HMAS Gawler, for the town of Gawler, South Australia.

- HMAS Gawler (J188), a Bathurst-class corvette launched in 1941 and transferred to the Turkish Navy in 1946
- HMAS Gawler (FCPB 212), a Fremantle-class patrol boat launched in 1983 and decommissioned in 2006

== Battle honours ==
Ships named HMAS Gawler are entitled to carry three battle honours:

- Pacific 1942
- Indian Ocean 1943–45
- Sicily 1943
