= Bendigo (disambiguation) =

Bendigo is a city in Victoria, Australia.

Bendigo may also refer to:

== Places ==
=== In Australia ===
- City of Greater Bendigo, a local government area in Victoria
  - Bendigo railway station
- Division of Bendigo, Australian electoral division in Victoria
- Bendigo Creek, Victoria
- Bendigo (suburb), suburb of Greater Bendigo

=== In New Zealand ===
- Bendigo, New Zealand, a settlement and historic area in Otago
- Bendigo Goldfields, a historic gold mining area in Otago

== Other uses ==
- William Abednego "Bendigo" Thompson (1811–1880), English bare-knuckle boxer and namesake of the town
- Bendigo (horse), a thoroughbred racehorse
- HMAS Bendigo, two ships of the Royal Australian Navy

== See also ==
- Greater Bendigo National Park, in Victoria, Australia
- Bendigo Box-Ironbark Region, a tract of land in Victoria, Australia
- Bendigo Province, former electorate in Victoria, Australia
