= Charles Page (photographer) =

Australian documentary photographer

Charles John Page
- Born: 1 September 1946 (age 80); Melbourne, Australia
- Education: Queensland College of Art; Griffith University; RMIT
- Occupations: Photographer and lecturer
- Website: charlespage.com

Charles Page (born 1 September 1946 in Melbourne) is a Brisbane-based documentary photographer, and lecturer at the Queensland College of Art. He studied at Griffith University where he got a PhD.

== Biography ==
Described by Merle Hathaway, Director of the Horsham Regional Art Gallery, as "one of Australia's best itinerant documentary photographers", Page began photographing in his early teens. He obtained a Bachelor of Arts (Photography) in 1981 from the Royal Melbourne Institute of Technology. After working as a photographer in Melbourne for several years, he moved to Queensland to take up a lecturing position with the Queensland College of Art. In 2003 he was awarded a PhD (By Publication) by Griffith University for his photographic achievements.

Page's photography extends from documenting the mundane to the extremes of human life. Over an extensive career, Page has photographed in more than 70 countries, notably Chechnya, Somalia and Antarctica, covering themes as varied as War Photography, Nature photography, Portrait Photography, and the nude.

Page's work has been exhibited in a number solo and group exhibitions, both in Australia and overseas. His work is in numerous public and private collections, including Australian Antarctic Division, Australian Parliament House, Australian War Memorial (Canberra), International Committee of the Red Cross (Geneva), the Queensland Art Gallery (QAG List of Artists), and the National Library of Australia.

== Commissions ==
From 1984 to 1986 Page was one of 22 Australian photographers commissioned by the New Parliament House Construction Authority Art Acquisitions Committee to produce a folio of photographs based on the construction of the new Australian Parliament House, Canberra. Images from this commission can be found in Picture Australia and the National Library of Australia, as well as images from Australian Antarctic Territory, Boggo Road Goal, construction of the Alice Springs to Darwin Railway, 2003, and 1st Battalion, Royal Australian Regiment in Somalia.

In 1988, he was one of six photographers commissioned by the Queensland Art Gallery and the Australian Bicentennial Authority to document Queensland community life. The project, which culminated in the exhibition Journey's North at the Queensland Art Gallery, aimed to encourage achievement and appreciation of contemporary art photography, as much as to celebrate and record the richness and diversity of community life in the late 1980s.

== Projects ==
Page's national and international projects include:

- 1967–99 An extensive project to document the decline of steam locomotion in rail transportation. The project involved all Australian states;
- 1993 Photographed in the Antarctic under the auspices of ANARE (Australian National Antarctic Research Expeditions) (Australian Arctic Arts Fellowship). The project addressed environmental issues, the removal of the last Australian Huskies and the Antarctic Landscape. Images from this project are displayed at Mawson Base, Antarctica.
- 1972–2002 An extensive project to document photographically the decline of steam locomotion. The project also addressed the sociological implications brought about by this evolution in technology. The project concentrated on the following countries:
- 1972 South Africa, Rhodesia, Swaziland, Europe
- 1978 China, India, Malaysia
- 1980 India, Pakistan
- 1999 Western China, Inner Mongolia
- 2001 the Forest railways of Manchuria, Northern China
- 2002 Western China, Heavy Industrial sites and operational Steam Trains
- 1992 Photographed in Pakistan and Afghanistan the operations of the International Committee of Red Cross. This project concentrated on I.C.R.C. activities concerned with the Afghanistan War
- 1993 Photographed in Malawi, Mozambique and Somalia. A number of images from Somalia are included in the collection of the Australian War Memorial. Page was one of only two photographers to record the convoy from the port of Mogadishu to Baidoa by members of the 1st Battalion, The Royal Australian Regiment (1RAR) and a United States convoy of troops. (Australian War Memorial Collection)
- 1995 & 1996 Photographed in Chechnya (Russian Federation) under the auspices of the International Committee of Red Cross. This project concentrated on ICRC activities concerned with the Chechnyan conflict
- 2000 & 2003 documented five Ipswich communities in the following geographical locations, Australia, U.S.A.[2], the U.K. and Jamaica
- 2005 Documented the environmentally disastrous Saemangeum reclamation project in South Korea. For more information see Saemangeum reference page from Birds Korea

== Publications ==
- Charles J. Page (2007). The Crystal Desert. Antarctic Photographs. ISBN 978-0-9803148-0-9 (hbk)
- Charles J. Page (2007). Cross Section. The documentary photography of Charles Page. Horsham Regional Art Gallery. ISBN 978-0-9803148-1-6 (pbk)
- Charles J. Page (2003).Visible traces of another life : the photography of Charles John Page 1966-2003: exhibition catalogue. Rockhampton, Qld: Rockhampton Art Gallery.
