= Geelong (disambiguation) =

Geelong is a city in Victoria, Australia.

Geelong may also refer to:

- HMAS Geelong, two ships of the Royal Australian Navy, named after the above city
- Geelong (ship), a ship owned by the Blue Anchor Line, and then by P&O, which transported soldiers of the Australian Imperial Force to World War I
- Geelong Football Club, a team in the Australian Football League, based in the city
- Geelong railway station

== See also ==
- Keelung, city in Taiwan
