= Freemantle (surname) =

Freemantle is a surname.

== Persons ==
People with this surname include:

- Andrew Freemantle (1768–1837), British cricket player
- Brian Freemantle (1936–2024), British author, creator of "Charlie Muffin"
- Frederick Freemantle (1871–1943), British cricket player
- George Freemantle (born 1806), British cricket player
- Glenn Freemantle, a British sound editor and sound designer
- John Freemantle (1758–1831), British cricket player
- Leslie Freemantle (1898–1963), Australian cricket player
- William Thomas Freemantle (1849–1931), British author and organist
- Zach Freemantle (born 2000), U.S. basketball player

== Fictional characters ==
- Abagail Freemantle, the name of Mother Abagail, a fictional character in Stephen King's novel, The Stand
- Edgar Freemantle, a fictional character in Stephen King's novel, Duma Key

== See also ==
- Fremantle (surname)
- Fremantle (disambiguation) including Freemantle
