= HMAS Bendigo (FCPB 211) =

1983 Fremantle-class patrol boat

History

Australia
- Name: HMAS Bendigo
- Namesake: City of Bendigo
- Builder: NQEA, Cairns
- Laid down: 21 September 1981
- Launched: 9 April 1983
- Commissioned: 28 May 1983
- Decommissioned: 9 September 2006
- Home port: HMAS Cairns
- Motto: "Advance with Purpose"
- Honours and awards: Three inherited battle honours
- Fate: Scrapped
- Badge

General characteristics
- Class & type: Fremantle-class patrol boat
- Displacement: 220 tons
- Length: 137.6 ft (41.9 m)
- Beam: 25.25 ft (7.70 m)
- Draught: 5.75 ft (1.75 m)
- Propulsion: 2 MTU series 538 diesel engines, 3,200 shp (2,400 kW), 2 propellers
- Speed: 30 knots (56 km/h; 35 mph)
- Range: 5,000 nmi (9,300 km; 5,800 mi) at 5 knots (9.3 km/h; 5.8 mph)
- Complement: 22
- Armament: 1 Bofors 40 mm/60 gun; 2 12.7 mm machine guns; 1 81 mm mortar (removed later)

HMAS Bendigo (FCPB 211) was a Fremantle-class patrol boat in the Royal Australian Navy (RAN).

== Design and construction ==
Starting in the late 1960s, planning began for a new class of patrol boat to replace the Attack class, with designs calling for improved seakeeping capability, and updated weapons and equipment. The Fremantles had a full load displacement of 220 tonnes (220 long tons; 240 short tons), were 137.6 feet (41.9 m) long overall, had a beam of 24.25 feet (7.39 m), and a maximum draught of 5.75 feet (1.75 m). Main propulsion machinery consisted of two MTU series 538TB91 V16 diesel engines, which supplied 3,200 shaft horsepower (2,400 kW) to the two propeller shafts. Exhaust was not expelled through a funnel, like most ships, but through vents below the waterline.

The patrol boat could reach a maximum speed of 30 knots (56 km/h; 35 mph), and had a maximum range of 5,000 nautical miles (9,300 km; 5,800 mi) at 5 knots (9.3 km/h; 5.8 mph). The ship's company consisted of 22 personnel. Each patrol boat was armed with a single Bofors 40mm gun as main armament, supplemented by two .50-calibre Browning machineguns and an 81 mm mortar, although the mortar was removed from all ships sometime after 1988. The main weapon was originally to be two 30-mm guns on a twin-mount, but the reconditioned Bofors were selected to keep costs down; provision was made to install an updated weapon later in the class' service life, but this did not eventuate.

Bendigo was laid down by NQEA in Cairns, Queensland on 21 September 1981, launched on 9 April 1983, and commissioned on 28 May 1983.

== Operational history ==
Bendigo operated out of HMAS Cairns, and spent the majority of her career protecting Australia's northern borders.

On 12 November 1998, Bendigo grounded on submerged rocks near Michaelmas Cay, 20 miles north of Cairns, while carrying 45 passengers for a Family Day cruise. There were no casualties and only minor damage to the patrol boat, which was refloated 35 minutes after the grounding, with the help of an Australian Volunteer Coast Guard boat.

On 16 July 1985, Bendigo became the first patrol boat to circumnavigate Australia.

== Fate ==
Bendigo was decommissioned on 9 September 2006. The patrol boat was broken up for scrap in Darwin during 2006 and 2007, at a cost of $450,000 to the Australian government.
