= HMAS Gladstone (FCPB 216) =

1984 Fremantle-class patrol boat

Coordinates: 23.833173°S 151.252769°E

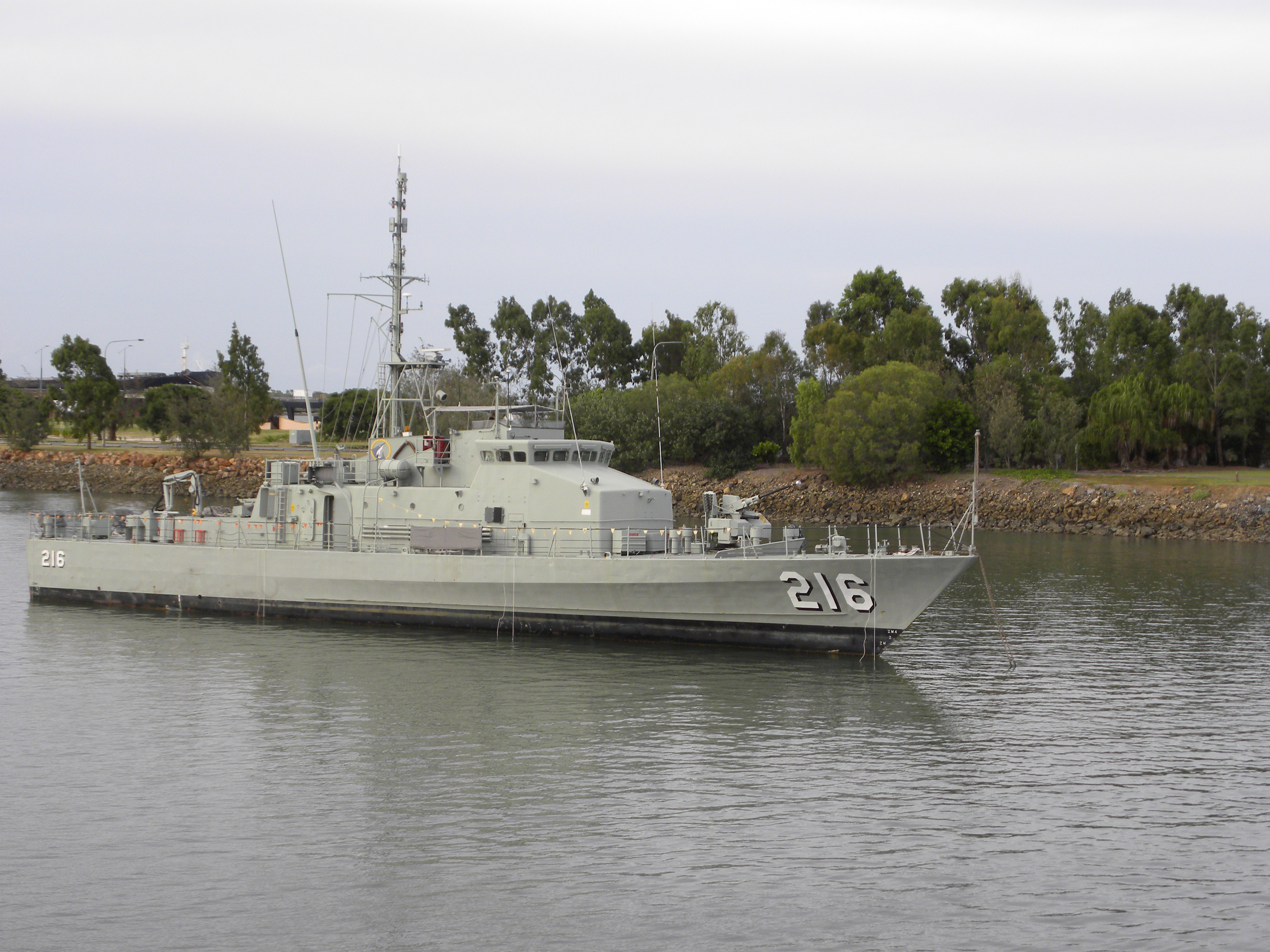
- HMAS Gladstone in 2010

History

Australia
- Namesake: City of Gladstone, Queensland
- Builder: NQEA, Cairns
- Laid down: 7 March 1983
- Launched: 28 July 1984
- Commissioned: 8 September 1984
- Decommissioned: 13 March 2007
- Motto: "Defend the right"
- Nickname(s): "Sadrock"
- Honours and awards: Two inherited battle honours
- Status: Preserved as museum ship in Gladstone
- Badge

General characteristics
- Class & type: Fremantle class patrol boat
- Displacement: 220 tons
- Length: 137.6 ft (41.9 m)
- Beam: 25.25 ft (7.70 m)
- Draught: 5.75 ft (1.75 m)
- Propulsion: 2 MTU series 538 diesel engines, 3,200 shp (2,400 kW), 2 propellers
- Speed: 30 knots (56 km/h; 35 mph)
- Range: 5,000 nautical miles (9,300 km; 5,800 mi) at 5 knots (9.3 km/h; 5.8 mph)
- Complement: 24
- Electronic warfare & decoys: Type 133 Prism ESM
- Armament: 1 Bofors 40 mm/60 gun; 2 12.7 mm machine guns; 1 81 mm mortar (removed later)

HMAS Gladstone (FCPB 216), named for the city of Gladstone, Queensland, is a Fremantle class patrol boat, formerly operated by Royal Australian Navy (RAN). Built by NQEA during the early 1980s, Gladstone was commissioned into RAN service in 1984.

The patrol boat spent most of its career operating out of the naval base HMAS Cairns on fisheries and border protection operations. The ship's company were granted Freedom of the City of their ship's namesake city on three occasions.

Gladstone was decommissioned in 2007, and was donated to the Gladstone Maritime History Society for preservation and display as a museum ship at the Gladstone Maritime Museum. Work was postponed due to the 2008 financial crisis, with preservation work and development of a wet dock to display the ship completed in 2016. The vessel is now available for tours on weekends and is located in the Gladstone East Shores precinct, adjacent to the Gladstone Marina.

== Design and construction ==
Starting in the late 1960s, planning began for a new class of patrol boat to replace the Attack class, with designs calling for improved seakeeping capability, and updated weapons and equipment. The Fremantles had a full load displacement of 220 tonnes (220 long tons; 240 short tons), were 137.6 feet (41.9 m) long overall, had a beam of 24.25 feet (7.39 m), and a maximum draught of 5.75 feet (1.75 m). Main propulsion machinery consists of two MTU series 538 diesel engines, which supplied 3,200 shaft horsepower (2,400 kW) to the two propeller shafts. Exhaust was not expelled through a funnel, like most ships, but through vents below the waterline. The patrol boat could reach a maximum speed of 30 knots (56 km/h; 35 mph), and had a maximum range of 5,000 nautical miles (9,300 km; 5,800 mi) at 5 knots (9.3 km/h; 5.8 mph). The ship's company consisted of 24 personnel. Each patrol boat was armed with a single Bofors 40mm gun as main armament, supplemented by two .50 cal Browning machineguns and an 81-mm mortar, although the mortar was removed from all ships sometime after 1988. The main weapon was originally to be two 30-mm guns on a twin-mount, but the reconditioned Bofors were selected to keep costs down; provision was made to install an updated weapon later in the class' service life, but this did not eventuate.

Gladstone was laid down by NQEA in Cairns, Queensland on 7 March 1983, launched on 28 July 1984, and commissioned into the RAN on 8 September 1984. During its career, the patrol boat acquired the nickname "Sadrock".

== Operational history ==
Gladstone spent its entire life based at HMAS Cairns in Cairns, Queensland. The Fremantle class patrol boats operated primarily in northern Australian waters, and were tasked with fisheries protection, border protection, immigration and customs duties, law enforcement operations, and maritime surveillance.

The ship's company of Gladstone were granted Freedom of the City of Gladstone for the first time in 1988.

In April 1990, Gladstone apprehended the Taiwanese fishing vessel Hai Chang 11, which had been detected fishing inside the Australian Economic Exclusion Zone, but failed to stop when approached by the patrol boat. Hai Chang 11 was taken to Darwin, where the fishing vessel's captain was prosecuted.

During 2006, Gladstone intercepted ten illegal fishing boats. One of the vessels had a cargo of 750 kilograms (1,650 lb) of reef fish.

Freedom of Entry to the patrol boat's namesake city was granted for the second time in July 2000.

The ship's company were granted Freedom of the city for the third and final time on Australia Day (26 January) 2007, in the leadup to the ship's decommissioning. Gladstone was originally planned to decommission on 16 February 2007, but was deployed at the start of the month as part of Operation Resolute, to replace several Armidale class patrol boats pulled from duty over safety concerns and water contamination of fuel systems.

== Fate ==
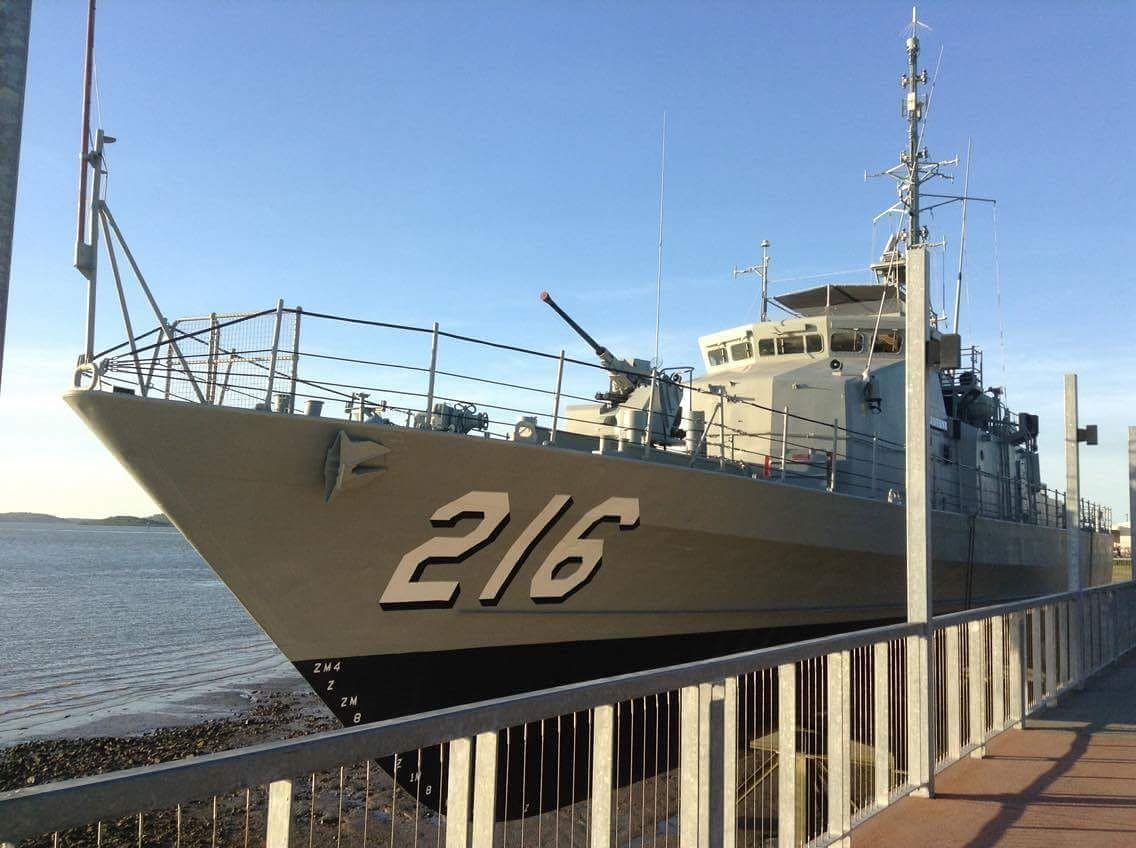
HMAS Gladstone in 2020

Gladstone was decommissioned in Cairns on 13 March 2007. During the ship's career, it sailed over 610,000 nautical miles (1,130,000 km; 700,000 mi). Gladstone was preserved as a museum ship and attached to the Gladstone Maritime Museum during the latter's redevelopment, and was gifted on the same day to the Gladstone Maritime History Society. After sailing from Cairns to Gladstone, the patrol boat was formally presented to the city mayor, who then handed the ship over to the society.

The 2008 financial crisis resulted in postponement of plans to preserve the vessel, and it was stored at the Gladstone Marina. In late 2009, plans were announced to move Gladstone to a more prominent location, before mounting the vessel out of the water on a plinth when the museum upgrade is complete. The patrol boat was relocated to a wet dock at East Shores in November 2014. Gladstone is mounted on support cradles, and has undergone refurbishment and repainting before it was opened to the public. At the start of 2015, opening to the public was predicted for around Easter 2015, although as of October, further work in making the ship safe and accessible was required. In October 2015, $116,000 was allocated to the project by the Government of Queensland from federal tourism funding.
