= Ipswich (disambiguation) =

Ipswich is the county town of Suffolk, England.

Ipswich may also refer to:

== Places ==
=== Australia ===
- City of Ipswich, local government area
  - Ipswich, Queensland, Australia
  - Ipswich city centre
- Electoral district of Ipswich
- Electoral district of Ipswich (New South Wales), a former electoral district in New South Wales

=== England ===
- Ipswich (UK Parliament constituency)
- Ipswich and South Suffolk, a unitary authority due to be formed in 2028, sometimes called "greater Ipswich"

=== United States ===
- Ipswich, Massachusetts, a New England town
  - Ipswich (CDP), Massachusetts, the main village in the town
  - Ipswich (MBTA station)
- Ipswich, South Dakota
- Ipswich, Wisconsin

== Sports ==
- Ipswich Town F.C., an English Football League team in Ipswich, Suffolk
- Ipswich Knights Soccer Club, a soccer club in Ipswich, Queensland
- Ipswich Jets, a rugby club in Ipswich, Queensland
- Ipswich Cougars an American football club in Ipswich, Queensland
- Ipswich Cardinals, an American football club in Ipswich, Suffolk
- Ipswich Witches, a British speedway club based at Ipswich, Suffolk
- Ipswich City FC, a football club from Ipswich City, Brisbane, Australia

== Other uses ==
- Ipswich River, a river in Massachusetts, United States
- Ipswitch, Inc., creator of the File Transfer Protocol software WS FTP
- HMAS Ipswich, two warships operated by the Royal Australian Navy (RAN)
- Ipswich School, an independent school in Ipswich, Suffolk
- Ipswichian interglacial, alternative name for the Eemian Stage, Pleistocene English interglacial period dating from 75,000 to 130,000 years ago
- Ipswich clams, Soft-shell clams
- PS Ipswich, a ship
