= Thomas Fremantle =

Thomas Fremantle may refer to:

- Thomas Fremantle (Royal Navy officer) (1765–1819), British admiral and friend of Lord Nelson
- Thomas Fremantle, 1st Baron Cottesloe (1798–1890), Conservative politician
- Thomas Fremantle, 2nd Baron Cottesloe (1830–1918), British businessman and politician
- Thomas Fremantle, 3rd Baron Cottesloe (1862–1956), expert rifleman and Olympian

== See also ==
- William Thomas Freemantle (1849–1931), British author and organist
