= HMAS Fremantle =

Two vessels of the Royal Australian Navy have been named HMAS Fremantle for the city of Fremantle, Western Australia:

- HMAS Fremantle (J246), a Bathurst-class corvette launched in 1943 and decommissioned in 1959
- HMAS Fremantle (FCPB 203), a Fremantle-class patrol boat commissioned in 1980 and decommissioned in 2006

== Battle honours ==
Ships named HMAS Fremantle are entitled to carry two battle honours:

- Darwin 1943
- Pacific 1943–45
