= William Fremantle =

William Fremantle may refer to:

- William Fremantle (politician) (1766–1850), British courtier and politician
- William Fremantle (Dean of Ripon, died 1895) (1807–1895), Anglican priest and Dean of Ripon
- William Fremantle (Dean of Ripon, died 1916) (1831–1916), Anglican priest and Dean of Ripon

== See also ==
- William Thomas Freemantle (1849–1931), British author and organist
