= HMAS Fremantle (FCPB 203) =

1979 Fremantle-class patrol boat

History

Australia
- Namesake: City of Fremantle
- Builder: Brooke Marine, Lowestoft, England
- Laid down: 11 November 1977
- Launched: 15 February 1979
- Commissioned: 17 March 1980
- Decommissioned: 11 August 2006
- Home port: HMAS Waterhen, HMAS Coonawarra
- Motto: "Incorruptible"
- Honours and awards: Two inherited battle honours
- Fate: Scrapped
- Badge

General characteristics
- Class & type: Fremantle-class patrol boat
- Displacement: 220 tons
- Length: 137.6 ft (41.9 m)
- Beam: 25.25 ft (7.70 m)
- Draught: 5.75 ft (1.75 m)
- Propulsion: 2 MTU series 538 diesel engines, 3,200 shp (2,400 kW), 2 propellers
- Speed: 30 knots (56 km/h; 35 mph)
- Range: 5,000 nmi (9,300 km; 5,800 mi) at 5 knots (9.3 km/h; 5.8 mph)
- Complement: 22
- Armament: 1 Bofors 40 mm/60 Bofors gun; 2 12.7 mm machine guns; 1 81 mm mortar (removed later)

HMAS Fremantle (FCPB 203), named for the city of Fremantle, Western Australia, was the lead ship of the Fremantle-class patrol boats, entering service in the Royal Australian Navy in 1980 and decommissioning in 2006. Fremantle was the only ship of the class not constructed in Australia, and it is claimed that her delivery voyage from England to Australia was the longest ever made by a patrol boat.

== Design ==
Starting in the late 1960s, planning began for a new class of patrol boat to replace the Attack class, with designs calling for improved seakeeping capability, and updated weapons and equipment. In 1976, Brooke Marine of England won the contract to produce the lead ship.

The Fremantles had a full load displacement of 220 tonnes (220 long tons; 240 short tons), were 137.6 feet (41.9 m) long overall, had a beam of 24.25 feet (7.39 m), and a maximum draught of 5.75 feet (1.75 m). Main propulsion machinery consisted of two MTU series 538 diesel engines, which supplied 3,200 shaft horsepower (2,400 kW) to the two propeller shafts. Exhaust was not expelled through a funnel, like most ships, but through vents below the waterline. The patrol boat could reach a maximum speed of 30 knots (56 km/h; 35 mph), and had a maximum range of 5,000 nautical miles (9,300 km; 5,800 mi) at 5 knots (9.3 km/h; 5.8 mph). The ship's company consisted of 22 personnel. Each patrol boat was armed with a single 40 mm Bofors gun as main armament, supplemented by two .50 cal Browning machine guns and an 81 mm mortar, although the mortar was removed from all ships sometime in the late 1990s. The main weapon was originally to be two 30 mm guns on a twin-mount, but the reconditioned Bofors were selected to keep costs down; provision was made to install an updated weapon later in the class' service life, but this did not eventuate.

== Construction ==
Construction of Fremantle began on 11 November 1977, and she was launched on 15 February 1979. During sea trials, Fremantle was revealed to be 20 tons over the contract's proscribed weight, leading to unpopularity in the media. However, the design proved its worth when it was diverted from trial to successfully rescue a British sailor thrown from a fishing trawler. Because of the sea trials, Fremantle was not commissioned until 17 March 1980.

Delivery of previous Brooke Marine patrol boats to the client nations was normally done by loading the craft on a heavy lift ship. It was instead decided in 1979 to sail Fremantle to Australia; the Royal Australian Navy wanted to learn as much about the capabilities of the new design as quickly as possible, and the loss of an Omani Navy patrol vessel from a heavy lift ship during a storm was a cause of concern. On 7 June 1980, Fremantle left Lowestoft on the delivery voyage to Australia. The voyage took 82 days, 48 spent at sea. During this voyage, Fremantle travelled through the Mediterranean Sea, Suez Canal, Red Sea, along the coast of India, through Maritime Southeast Asia, then down the east coast of Australia to Sydney. During this voyage, Fremantle was tested to limits; encountering windstorms reaching Force 6, a sandstorm in the Red Sea, high-temperature and -humidity conditions, and a monsoon. By the time Fremantle arrived in Australia on 27 August 1980, she had already sailed 14,509 nautical miles (26,871 km; 16,697 mi). This is claimed to be the longest voyage undertaken by a single patrol boat.

== Operational history ==
During her career, Fremantle was primarily involved in operations against illegal fishing and illegal immigration, and supporting Coastwatch and the Australian Customs Service.

== Decommissioning and fate ==
On 11 August 2006, HMAS Fremantle was decommissioned at HMAS Coonawarra, Darwin. Fremantle was the eighth ship of her class to be decommissioned. Fremantle was in service for 26 years, and travelled a distance of 535,705 nautical miles (992,126 km; 616,478 mi) from commissioning. The patrol boat was broken up for scrap in Darwin during 2006 and 2007, at a cost of $450,000 to the Australian government.
