= HMAS Ipswich (FCPB 209) =

1982 Fremantle-class patrol boat

History

Australia
- Namesake: City of Ipswich
- Builder: NQEA, Cairns
- Laid down: 29 October 1980
- Launched: 25 September 1982
- Commissioned: 13 November 1982
- Decommissioned: 11 May 2007
- Home port: HMAS Cairns
- Motto: "Dare to Defy"
- Honours and awards: Five inherited battle honours
- Fate: Scrapped
- Badge

General characteristics
- Class & type: Fremantle-class patrol boat
- Displacement: 220 tons
- Length: 137.6 ft (41.9 m)
- Beam: 25.25 ft (7.70 m)
- Draught: 5.75 ft (1.75 m)
- Propulsion: 2 MTU series 538 diesel engines, 3,200 shp (2,400 kW), 2 propellers
- Speed: 30 knots (56 km/h; 35 mph)
- Range: 5,000 nmi (9,300 km; 5,800 mi) at 5 knots (9.3 km/h; 5.8 mph)
- Complement: 22
- Armament: 1 Bofors 40 mm/60 gun; 2 12.7 mm machine guns; 1 81 mm mortar (removed later)

HMAS Ipswich (FCPB 209), named for the city of Ipswich, Queensland, was a Fremantle-class patrol boat in the Royal Australian Navy (RAN).

== Design and construction ==
Starting in the late 1960s, planning began for a new class of patrol boat to replace the Attack class, with designs calling for improved seakeeping capability, and updated weapons and equipment. The Fremantles had a full load displacement of 220 tonnes (220 long tons; 240 short tons), were 137.6 feet (41.9 m) long overall, had a beam of 24.25 feet (7.39 m), and a maximum draught of 5.75 feet (1.75 m). Main propulsion machinery consisted of two MTU series 538 diesel engines, which supplied 3,200 shaft horsepower (2,400 kW) to the two propeller shafts. Exhaust was not expelled through a funnel, like most ships, but through vents below the waterline. The patrol boat could reach a maximum speed of 30 knots (56 km/h; 35 mph), and had a maximum range of 5,000 nautical miles (9,300 km; 5,800 mi) at 5 knots (9.3 km/h; 5.8 mph). The ship's company consisted of 22 personnel. Each patrol boat was armed with a single Bofors 40mm gun as main armament, supplemented by two .50 cal Browning machineguns and an 81 mm mortar, although the mortar was removed from all ships sometime after 1988. The main weapon was originally to be two 30 mm guns on a twin-mount, but the reconditioned Bofors were selected to keep costs down; provision was made to install an updated weapon later in the class' service life, but this did not eventuate.

Ipswich was laid down by NQEA in Cairns, Queensland on 29 October 1980, launched on 25 September 1982, and commissioned into the RAN on 13 November 1982.

== Operational history ==
During October and November 2006, Ipswich was the primary ship used for filming the 13-episode Australian television drama series Sea Patrol. Ipswich was rebadged as the fictional HMAS Hammersley (pennant number 202), and spent six weeks operating off Dunk Island with both the show's cast and her normal crew aboard. Footage of Ipswich at sea was mixed with scenes shot on and around sister ship HMAS Wollongong while the latter was docked in Sydney.

== Fate ==
Ipswich was decommissioned on 11 May 2007, in a joint ceremony with HMAS Townsville. The two patrol boats were the last of the class in active service. The patrol boat was broken up for scrap in Darwin during 2007, at a cost of $450,000 to the Australian government. The patrol boat's Bofors gun was incorporated into a naval memorial cairn shaped like Ipswich's bow in Queens Park, Ipswich.
