= Fremantle Football Club (disambiguation) =

The Fremantle Football Club is an Australian rules football club competing in the Australian Football League (AFL). "Fremantle Football Club" may also refer to:

- Fremantle Football Club (1881–1899), an Australian rules football club that competed in the West Australian Football Association from 1886 to 1899 (known as the Unions Football Club from 1881 to 1889)
- Fremantle Football Club (1882–1886), an Australian rules football club that competed in the West Australian Football Association from 1885 to 1886
- Fremantle Football Club, an Australian rules football club that competed in the now-defunct Fremantle Ex-Scholars competition

== See also ==
- Freemantle F.C., a 19th-century association football team that competed in the Southern Football League
- East Fremantle Football Club, a football club in the West Australian Football League
- North Fremantle Football Club, a football club that previously competed in the West Australian Football League
- South Fremantle Football Club, a football club in the West Australian Football League
- Fremantle (disambiguation)
