= HMS Launceston =

Two vessels of the Royal Navy have borne the name HMS Launceston:

- HMS Launceston (1711) was a 40-gun fifth-rate ship in service from 1711 and broken up at Deptford Dockyard in 1726.
- HMS Launceston (1741) was a 44-gun fifth-rate ship in service from 1741 to 1784.

== See also ==
- HMS Launceston Castle
- HMAS Launceston
