= HMAS Gladstone =

Two ships of the Royal Australian Navy (RAN) have been named HMAS Gladstone, for the port city of Gladstone, Queensland:

- HMAS Gladstone (J324), a Bathurst-class corvette commissioned in 1943 and paid off in 1956
- HMAS Gladstone (FCPB 216), Fremantle-class patrol boat commissioned in 1984 and decommissioned in 2007

== Battle honours ==
Ships named HMAS Gladstone are entitled to carry two battle honours:

- Pacific 1943–45
- New Guinea 1943–44
