= HMAS Geraldton =

Two ships of the Royal Australian Navy have been named HMAS Geraldton, for the port of Geraldton, Western Australia.

- HMAS Geraldton (J178), a Bathurst-class corvette launched in 1941 and sold to the Turkish Navy in 1946
- HMAS Geraldton (FCPB 213), a Fremantle-class patrol boat launched in 1983 and decommissioned in 2006

== Battle honours ==
Ships named HMAS Geraldton are entitled to carry three battle honours:

- Pacific 1942
- Indian Ocean 1942–45
- Sicily 1943
