= HMAS Bendigo =

Two ships of the Royal Australian Navy have been named HMAS Bendigo, for the city of Bendigo, Victoria.

- HMAS Bendigo (J187), a Bathurst-class corvette laid down in 1940 and sold into civilian service in 1946.
- HMAS Bendigo (FCPB 211), a Fremantle-class patrol boat laid down in 1981 and decommissioned in 2006.

== Battle honours ==
Ships named HMAS Bendigo have been awarded three battle honours.

- Pacific 1942–44
- New Guinea 1942–44
- Okinawa 1945
