= HMAS Warrnambool (FCPB 204) =

History

Australia
- Namesake: City of Warrnambool
- Builder: NQEA, Cairns
- Laid down: 30 September 1978
- Launched: 25 October 1980
- Commissioned: 14 March 1981
- Decommissioned: 29 November 2005
- Motto: "Protect and Avenge"
- Honours and awards: Three inherited battle honours
- Fate: Scrapped
- Badge

General characteristics
- Class & type: Fremantle class patrol boat
- Displacement: 220 tons
- Length: 137.6 ft (41.9 m)
- Beam: 25.25 ft (7.70 m)
- Draught: 5.75 ft (1.75 m)
- Propulsion: 2 MTU series 538 diesel engines, 3,200 shp (2,400 kW), 2 propellers
- Speed: 30 knots (56 km/h; 35 mph)
- Range: 5,000 nautical miles (9,300 km; 5,800 mi) at 5 knots (9.3 km/h; 5.8 mph)
- Complement: 22
- Armament: 1 Bofors 40 mm/60 Bofors gun; 2 12.7 mm machine guns; 1 81 mm mortar (removed later)

HMAS Warrnambool (FCPB 204), named after the city of Warrnambool, Victoria, was a Fremantle-class patrol boat of the Royal Australian Navy (RAN).

== Design and construction ==
Starting in the late 1960s, planning began for a new class of patrol boat to replace the Attack class, with designs calling for improved seakeeping capability, and updated weapons and equipment. The Fremantles had a full load displacement of 220 tonnes (220 long tons; 240 short tons), were 137.6 feet (41.9 m) long overall, had a beam of 24.25 feet (7.39 m), and a maximum draught of 5.75 feet (1.75 m). Main propulsion machinery consisted of two MTU series 538 diesel engines, which supplied 3,200 shaft horsepower (2,400 kW) to the two propeller shafts. Exhaust was not expelled through a funnel, like most ships, but through vents below the waterline. The patrol boat could reach a maximum speed of 30 knots (56 km/h; 35 mph), and had a maximum range of 5,000 nautical miles (9,300 km; 5,800 mi) at 5 knots (9.3 km/h; 5.8 mph). The ship's company consisted of 22 personnel. Each patrol boat was armed with a single 40 mm Bofors gun as main armament, supplemented by two .50 cal Browning machine guns and an 81 mm mortar, although the mortar was removed from all ships sometime in the late 1990s. The main weapon was originally to be two 30-mm guns on a twin-mount, but the reconditioned Bofors were selected to keep costs down; provision was made to install an updated weapon later in the class' service life, but this did not eventuate.

Warrnambool was built by NQEA, Cairns. The ship was laid down on 30 September 1978, launched on 25 October 1980, and commissioned into the RAN on 14 March 1981.

== Fate ==
Warrnambool was decommissioned on 29 November 2005.

The patrol boat was broken up for scrap in Darwin during 2006 and 2007, at a cost of $450,000 to the Australian government.
