= HMAS Whyalla =

Two ships of the Royal Australian Navy have been named HMAS Whyalla, for the city of Whyalla, South Australia.

- HMAS Whyalla (J153), a Bathurst-class corvette launched in 1941, decommissioned in 1946, operated as a Victorian Public Works lighthouse tender until 1984, and preserved as a landlocked museum ship in Whyalla.
- HMAS Whyalla (FCPB 208), a Fremantle-class patrol boat launched in 1982, and decommissioned in 2005. She was scrapped in 2006.

== Battle honours ==
Ships named HMAS Whyalla are entitled to carry three battle honours:

- Pacific 1942–45
- New Guinea 1942–44
- Okinawa 1945
