= HMAS Waterhen =

There have been one ship and one shore establishment in the Royal Australian Navy (RAN) named HMAS Waterhen. The first ship originally served under the name HMS Waterhen with the Royal Navy (RN). A British ship and an Australian ship of the name were ordered but later cancelled.

- HMAS Waterhen (D22) was a V and W-class destroyer commissioned into the RN in 1918. She was transferred to the RAN in 1933, and served until her loss from dive bomber attack on 29 June 1941.
- HMS Waterhen (U05) was a modified Black Swan-class sloop was ordered in 1944, but was cancelled in November 1945.
- HMAS Waterhen (1952) was a Daring-class destroyer laid down in 1952 but cancelled in 1954 and scrapped on the slipway.
- HMAS Waterhen (naval base) is a shore establishment based in Sydney, used as the headquarters of the RAN's Mine Warfare and Clearance Diving Group. The base was commissioned in 1962 and is operating as of 2016.

== Battle honours ==
Three battle honours have been awarded to ships named HMAS Waterhen:

- Libya 1940–41
- Greece 1941
- Crete 1941
