= Katharine Fremantle =

English art historian, architectural historian and academic

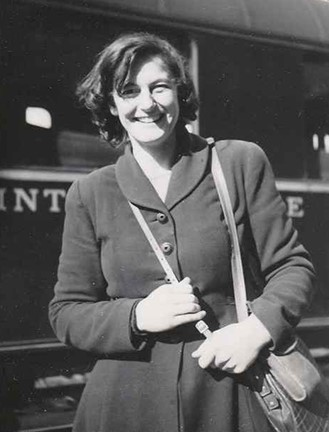
Freemantle (1951)

Katharine "Kay" Dorothy Honor Fremantle (born Swanbourne, 23 May 1919 – 2018), was an English art historian, architectural historian and academic based in the Netherlands.

== Early life and education ==
Her father was Colonel Thomas Francis Fremantle, 3rd Baron Cottesloe, 4th Baron Fremantle, and her mother was Florence Annie Alexandra Tapling. She was their youngest child, and had four elder brothers and three elder sisters. She studied at the University of Cambridge, completing her BA in 1941, followed by an MA. She went on to the Courtauld Institute of Art, University of London and completed her PhD in 1956, with a thesis on the Baroque Town Hall of Amsterdam (now known as the Royal Palace), which appeared in published form in 1959. Her supervisor at the Courtauld was Johannes Wilde. She contributed photographs to the Courtauld's Conway Library archive, which is currently undergoing a digitisation process as part of the Courtauld Connects project. There are also 18 photographs by her on the Courtauld's Art and Architecture website, of locations in Denmark, Belgium and Holland.

== Professional work ==
After completing her studies, Fremantle moved to the Netherlands, where she worked as an associate professor of Art History at Utrecht University, and later for the Vrije Universiteit Amsterdam.

Her personal archive was donated to the Netherlands Institute for Art History (RKD) in The Hague in the autumn of 2019, as a gift from Jan and Els Jimkes-Verkade of Utrecht. The archive contains correspondence with her Courtauld tutor Johannes Wilde, as well as with Jan van Gelder, Dutch art historian and former RKD Director, the Belgian art historian Elisabeth Danens, and a Courtauld fellow-student, Kerry Downes, who became an architectural historian. Van Gelder was a big influence on her work, supporting the publication of her thesis, encouraging her to write widely on her chosen subject, which helped to ensure that her book has remained the standard work on its subject. Van Gelder also encouraged her to publish the journal of the 18th century English painter, James Thornhill, who travelled in the Netherlands in 1711.

== Publications ==
=== Books ===
- Some drawings by Jacob van Campen for the Royal Palace of Amsterdam, 1953.
- The Baroque Town Hall of Amsterdam, Utrecht: Haentjens Dekker & Gumbert, 1959.
- Jan Jansz. De Vos, sculptor of Haarlem, the author of some notable lost works, Amsterdam: 1965.
- Sir James Thornhill's sketch-book travel journal of 1711: a visit to East Anglia and the Low Countries, Utrecht: Haentjens Dekker & Gumbert, 1975.
- Focus on sculpture: Quellien's art in the Palace on the Dam, Amsterdam, for an exhibition 12 June - 11 September 1977.

=== Articles ===
- 'Cornelis Brisé and the Festoon of Peace', Oud Holland, Quarterly for Dutch Art History, 1954.
- 'Themes from Ripa and Rubens in the Royal Palace of Amsterdam', Burlington Magazine, 1961.
- 'The open vierschaar of Amsterdam's seventeenth-century town hall as a setting for the city's justice', OudHolland, Quarterly for Dutch Art History, 1962.
- 'The fountains designed for van Campen's Amsterdam Town Hall and Quellien's models for them', Album discipulorum, 1963.
- 'A visit to the United Provinces and Cleves in the time of William III described in Edward Southwell's Journal', Nederlands kunsthistorisch jaarboek, 1970.
- 'The Identity of Johan Moreelse, Painter', Burlington Magazine, 1974.
- 'The theme of wise counsel in Amsterdam's former town hall', Burlington Magazine, ed. Benedict Nicolson. 2015.
