= HMAS Launceston =

Three ships of the Royal Australian Navy (RAN) have been named HMAS Launceston, after the city of Launceston, Tasmania.

- HMAS Launceston (J179), a Bathurst-class corvette commissioned in 1942, and transferred to the Turkish Navy in 1946
- HMAS Launceston (FCPB 207), a Fremantle-class patrol boat laid down in 1980, and decommissioned in 2006
- HMAS Launceston (ACPB 94), an Armidale-class patrol boat commissioned in 2007, and decommissioned in 2023

== Battle honours ==
Ships named HMAS Launceston are entitled to carry four battle honours:

- Pacific 1942–45
- Indian Ocean 1942–44
- East Indies 1944
- Okinawa 1945
