= John Fremantle =

John Fremantle may refer to:

- John Fremantle (British Army officer)
- John Fremantle, 5th Baron Cottesloe
- John Fremantle, 4th Baron Cottesloe

== See also ==
- John Freemantle, English cricketer
