= HMAS Ipswich =

Two ships of the Royal Australian Navy (RAN) have been named HMAS Ipswich, for the city of Ipswich, Queensland.

- HMAS Ipswich (J186), a Bathurst-class corvette launched in 1941 and transferred to the Royal Netherlands Navy in 1946
- HMAS Ipswich (FCPB 209), a Fremantle-class patrol boat which entered service in 1982 and was decommissioned in 2007

== Battle honours ==
Ships named HMAS Ipswich are entitled to carry five battle honours:

- Pacific 1942
- Indian Ocean 1942–45
- Sicily 1943
- East Indies 1944
- Okinawa 1945
