= HMAS Geelong =

Two ships of the Royal Australian Navy (RAN) have been named HMAS Geelong, for the city of Geelong, Victoria.

- HMAS Geelong (J201), a Bathurst-class corvette launched in 1941 and lost after colliding with an American tanker in 1944
- HMAS Geelong (FCPB 215), a Fremantle-class patrol boat launched in 1984 and decommissioned in 2006

== Battle honours ==
Ships named HMAS Geelong are entitled to carry two battle honours:

- Pacific 1942–44
- New Guinea 1944
