= HMAS Launceston (FCPB 207) =

Australian patrol boat

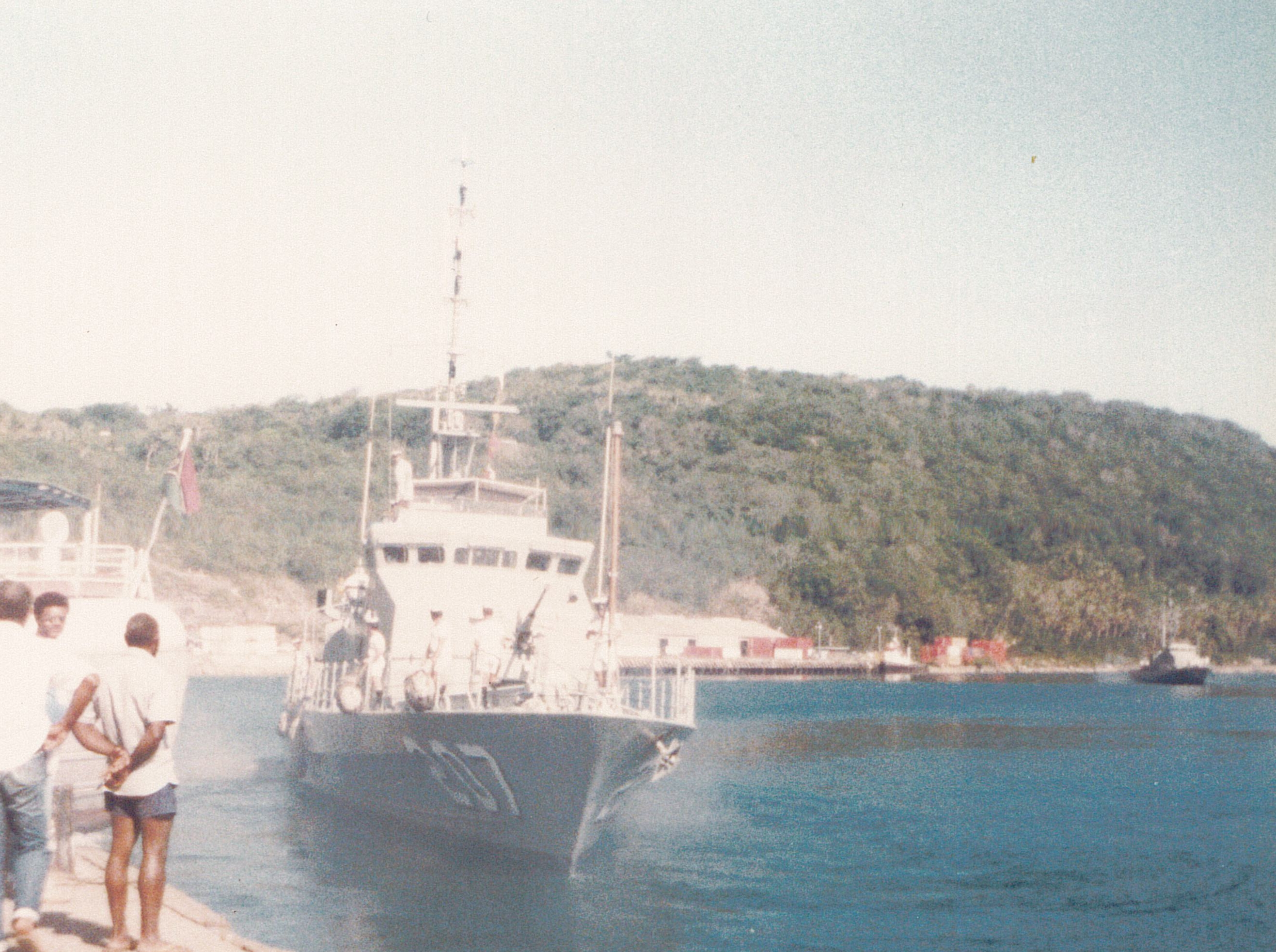
- HMAS Launceston approaching Port Vila dock

History

Australia
- Namesake: City of Launceston, Tasmania
- Builder: NQEA, Cairns
- Laid down: 29 March 1980
- Launched: 23 January 1982
- Commissioned: 1 March 1982
- Decommissioned: 8 September 2006
- Motto: "Progress with Prudence"
- Honours and awards: Four inherited battle honours
- Fate: Scrapped
- Badge

General characteristics
- Class & type: Fremantle-class patrol boat
- Displacement: 220 tons
- Length: 137.6 ft (41.9 m)
- Beam: 25.25 ft (7.70 m)
- Draught: 5.75 ft (1.75 m)
- Propulsion: 2 MTU series 538 diesel engines, 3,200 shp (2,400 kW), 2 propellers
- Speed: 30 knots (56 km/h; 35 mph)
- Range: 5,000 nmi (9,300 km; 5,800 mi) at 5 knots (9.3 km/h; 5.8 mph)
- Complement: 22
- Armament: 1 Bofors 40 mm/60 gun; 2 12.7 mm machine guns; 1 81 mm mortar (removed later)

HMAS Launceston (FCPB 207), named for the city of Launceston, Tasmania, was a Fremantle-class patrol boat of the Royal Australian Navy (RAN).

== Design and construction ==
Starting in the late 1960s, planning began for a new class of patrol boat to replace the Attack class, with designs calling for improved seakeeping capability, and updated weapons and equipment. The Fremantles had a full load displacement of 220 tonnes (220 long tons; 240 short tons), were 137.6 feet (41.9 m) long overall, had a beam of 24.25 feet (7.39 m), and a maximum draught of 5.75 feet (1.75 m). Main propulsion machinery consisted of two MTU series 538 diesel engines, which supplied 3,200 shaft horsepower (2,400 kW) to the two propeller shafts. Exhaust was not expelled through a funnel, like most ships, but through vents below the waterline. The patrol boat could reach a maximum speed of 30 knots (56 km/h; 35 mph), and had a maximum range of 5,000 nautical miles (9,300 km; 5,800 mi) at 5 knots (9.3 km/h; 5.8 mph). The ship's company consisted of 22 personnel. Each patrol boat was armed with a single Bofors 40mm gun as main armament, supplemented by two .50 cal Browning machineguns and an 81 mm mortar, although the mortar was removed from all ships sometime after 1988. The main weapon was originally to be two 30-mm guns on a twin-mount, but the reconditioned Bofors were selected to keep costs down; provision was made to install an updated weapon later in the class' service life, but this did not eventuate.

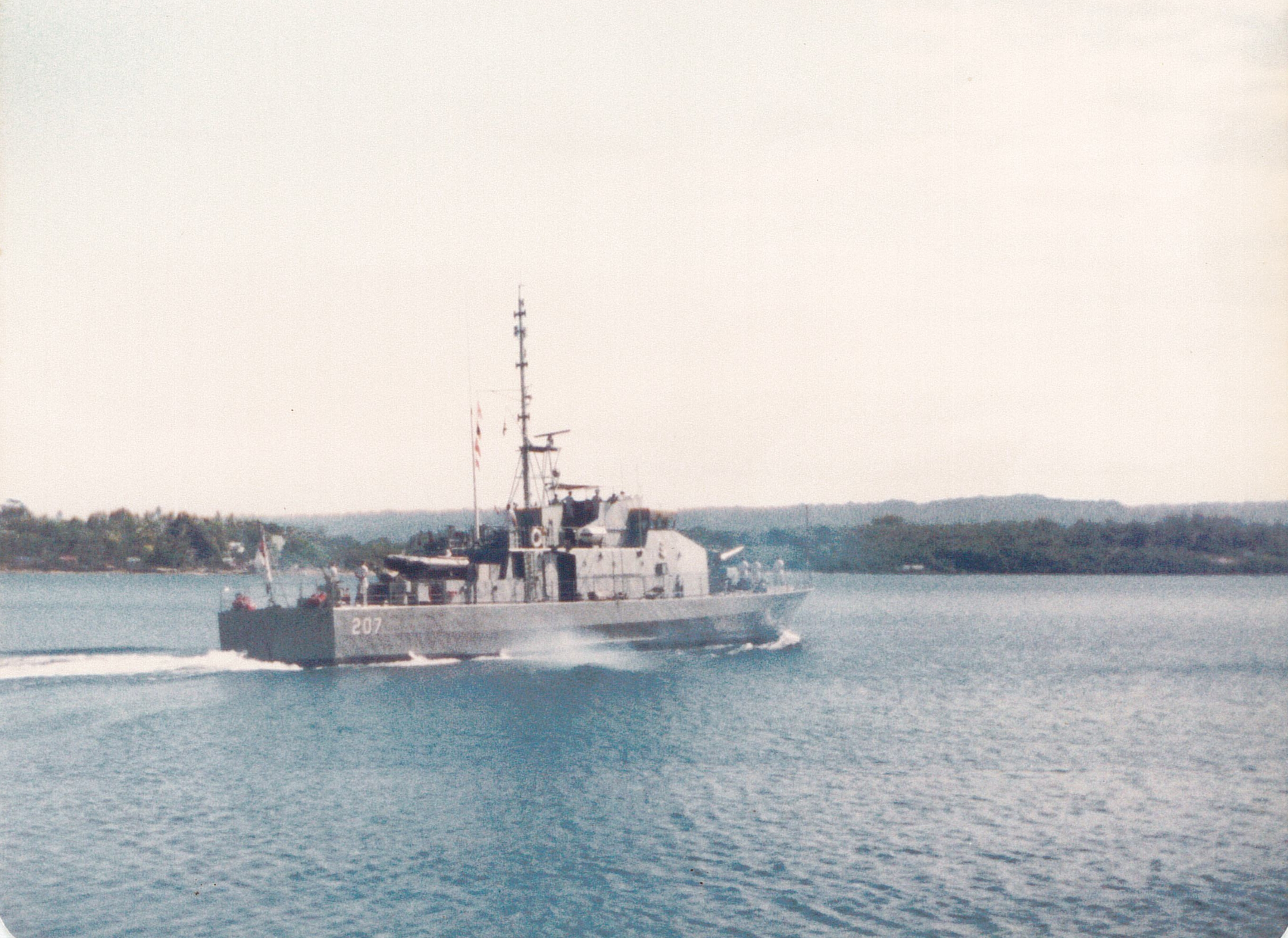
HMAS Launceston on patrol

Launceston was laid down by NQEA at Cairns, Queensland on 29 March 1980. She was launched on 23 January 1982, and commissioned into the RAN on 1 March 1982.

== Fate ==
Launceston was decommissioned in Darwin on 8 September 2006. The patrol boat was broken up for scrap in Darwin during 2006 and 2007, at a cost of $450,000 to the Australian government.
