= HMAS Wollongong (FCPB 206) =

1981 Fremantle-class patrol boat

History

Australia
- Namesake: City of Wollongong
- Builder: NQEA, Cairns
- Laid down: 23 July 1979
- Launched: 17 October 1981
- Commissioned: 28 November 1981
- Decommissioned: 11 February 2006
- Home port: HMAS Coonawarra
- Motto: "Heed the Call"
- Honours and awards: Six inherited battle honours
- Fate: Scrapped
- Badge

General characteristics
- Class & type: Fremantle-class patrol boat
- Displacement: 220 tons
- Length: 137.6 ft (41.9 m)
- Beam: 25.25 ft (7.70 m)
- Draught: 5.75 ft (1.75 m)
- Propulsion: 2 MTU series 538 diesel engines, 3,200 shp (2,400 kW), 2 propellers
- Speed: 30 knots (56 km/h; 35 mph)
- Range: 5,000 nmi (9,300 km; 5,800 mi) at 5 knots (9.3 km/h; 5.8 mph)
- Complement: 22
- Armament: 1 Bofors 40 mm/60 Bofors gun; 2 12.7 mm machine guns; 1 81 mm mortar (removed later)

HMAS Wollongong (FCPB 206), named for the city of Wollongong, New South Wales, was one of fifteen Fremantle-class patrol boats to operate with the Royal Australian Navy (RAN). Wollongong is the only RAN vessel to have appeared in two television series, portraying a fictional Fremantle-class patrol boat in both.

== Design and construction ==
Starting in the late 1960s, planning began for a new class of patrol boat to replace the Attack class, with designs calling for improved seakeeping capability, and updated weapons and equipment. The Fremantles had a full load displacement of 220 tonnes (220 long tons; 240 short tons), were 137.6 feet (41.9 m) long overall, had a beam of 24.25 feet (7.39 m), and a maximum draught of 5.75 feet (1.75 m). Main propulsion machinery consisted of two MTU series 538 diesel engines, which supplied 3,200 shaft horsepower (2,400 kW) to the two propeller shafts. Exhaust was not expelled through a funnel, like most ships, but through vents below the waterline. The patrol boat could reach a maximum speed of 30 knots (56 km/h; 35 mph), and had a maximum range of 5,000 nautical miles (9,300 km; 5,800 mi) at 5 knots (9.3 km/h; 5.8 mph). The ship's company consisted of 22 personnel.

Each patrol boat was armed with a single 40 mm Bofors gun as main armament, supplemented by two .50 cal Browning machineguns and an 81 mm mortar, although the mortar was removed from all ships sometime after 1988. The main weapon was originally to be two 30-mm guns on a twin-mount, but the reconditioned Bofors were selected to keep costs down; provision was made to install an updated weapon later in the class' service life, but this did not eventuate.

Wollongong was laid down by NQEA, Cairns on 23 July 1979. She was launched on 17 October 1981, and commissioned into the RAN on 28 November 1981.

== Operational history ==
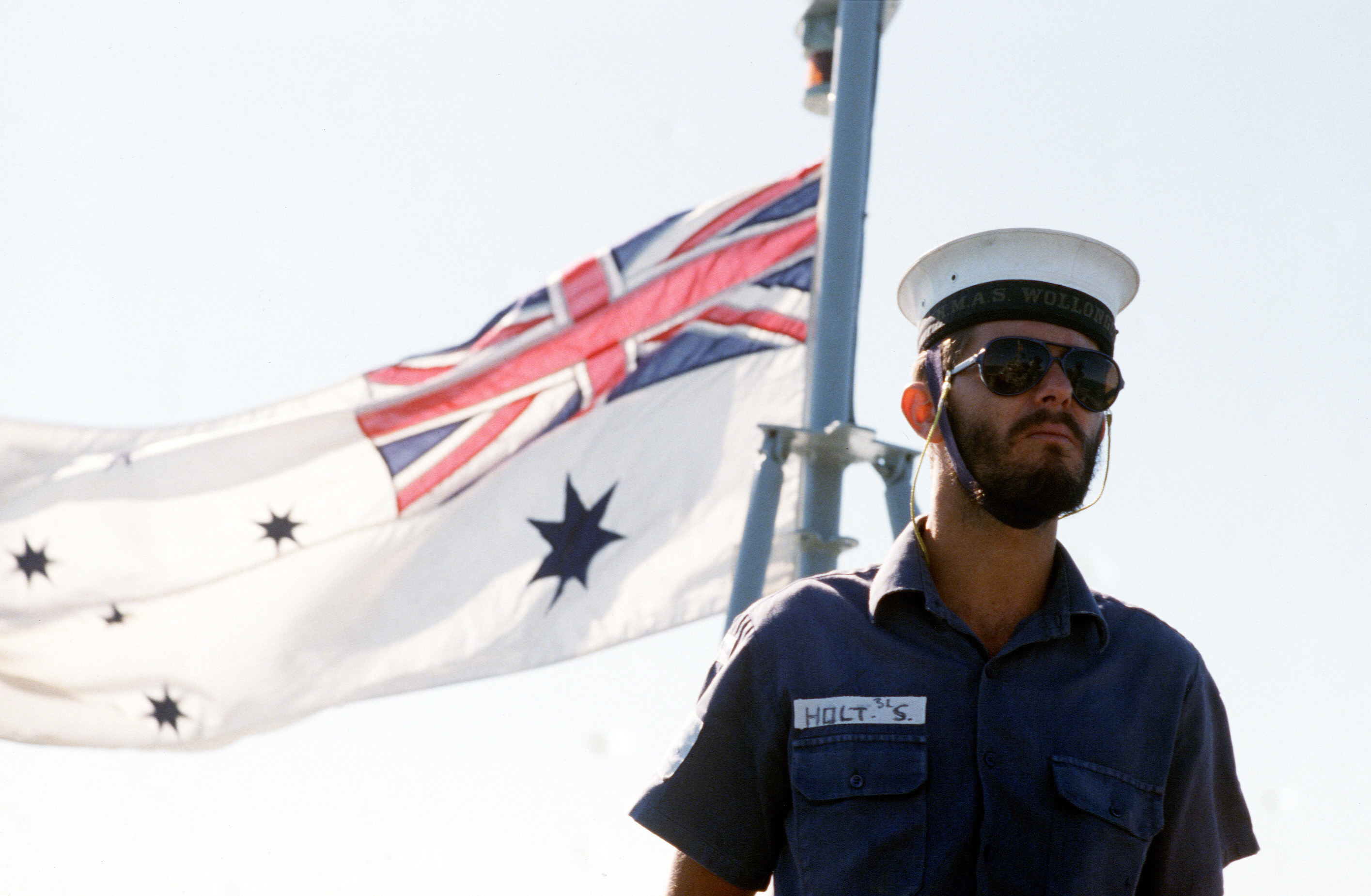
A member of Wollongong's crew in 1991

In 1983, Wollongong was one of five ships used to portray HMAS Defiance in the second season of Patrol Boat.

On 31 May 1985, Wollongong grounded on rocks at Gabo Island, causing extensive damage to the vessel. Attempts to refloat the patrol boat were made at high tide on 31 May, but an oil rig tender was unable to tow Wollongong off the rocks, as the patrol boat's propellers and shafts were pinned. Running repairs, efforts to lighten the ship by removing loose equipment, and the assistance of salvage crews with flotation bags allowed the ship to be recovered at the evening high tide of 3 June. After being towed to Eden for repairs, Wollongong was then towed to Cairns for rebuilding by NQEA, and returned to service in mid-to-late 1986. Wollongong's commanding officer was court martialed and convicted of negligence over the grounding. He was penalised with the loss of 18 months seniority.

Wollongong was deployed to the Solomon Islands during October and November 2003 as part of the Regional Assistance Mission to Solomon Islands.

== Fate ==
Wollongong was decommissioned on 11 February 2006.

After being decommissioned from service, Wollongong one of two patrol boats used to portray HMAS Hammersley for the first season of the Australian television drama series Sea Patrol. Wollongong, docked at HMAS Waterhen was used for scenes aboard and around the docked ship. This footage was conflated with scenes shot aboard the operational HMAS Ipswich to create the fictional patrol boat.

The patrol boat was broken up for scrap in Port Macquarie during 2007, at a cost of $400,000 to the Australian government.
