= William Thomas Freemantle =

William Thomas Freemantle (1849–1931) was an author and organist based in Sheffield England and a founding member of both The Sheffield Corporation and The Hunter Archaeological society.

== Life ==
Born in Sussex to Henry and Martha (née Partington) Freemantle on 24 November 1849, a younger brother to Henry Issatte Freemantle (born in, New York, 1847, Shortly after his birth the family returned to Chichester, England). The Family moved to Sheffield in 1855 where his father acquired a music shop. Educated at Bowling’s Milk Street Academy and then at the Grammar School before moving to Lincoln for five years as a pupil to the Lincoln cathedral organist, John Young. On return to Sheffield at age 21, Freemantle worked in St. Andrew’s Church in Sharrow for 20 years as an organist.

At 21, Freemantle promotes ‘his intention of giving Instruction on the Organ, Harmonium and Pianoforte. To Choirs, choral societies; and in harmony and composition, either at home or at the residence of Pupils’ although his obituary from The Hunter Archaeological society states that he did ‘very little teaching but gave assistance to his father in the conduct of his business’.

Freemantle married his first wife was Margaret ('Maggie', née Massey) in around 1880–82. After her death on 28 December 1920, she was survived by their daughter Annie Pauline Freemantle who was born 8 May 1883. Annie married Henry A. Freemantle, the son of W. T. Freemantle's nephew, on 15 April 1912 in Dunbar S. Africa. Freemantle remarries in 1925 to Doris Freemantle (née Hawkswell) who inherited his estate upon his death, on 19 December 1931 at the age of 82.

== Appointments ==
- Assistant organist at Lincoln Cathedral
- Organist of St Mary le Wigford, Lincoln
- Organist of St Andrew's Church, Sharrow, Sheffield 1871

== Collections ==
In a draft lecture, written by Freemantle about how he became a collector, he discusses how, in around 1874 in Sheffield New-Market, he came across an old book stall selling "a rather soiled looking lot of manuscript music", which, although he did not know it at the time, contained the signature of Felix Mendelssohn Bartholdy, as a self-confessed great lover of Mendelssohn’s music ‘It was in that Cathedral my love for music began and of all the music I heard, I think no composer’s music touched me more than that of Felix Mendelssohn Bartholdy’s. This saw the beginning of his collecting interests.

By the late 19th Century, Freemantle owned over 192 Mendelssohn autographs and 300 autograph letters, alongside 40 portraits and a large collection of Mendelssohn-related memorabilia. His collection of Mendelssohn autographs comprised the largest outside of the Mendelssohn family.

Other musical collecting interests included autographs and manuscripts by numerous other authors, including works from 18th century English composers, such as Charles Dibdin, William Croft and Benjamin Cooke and other 18th and 19th century musical figures.

In keeping with his interests in local history, Freemantle collected of Rockingham pottery. Rockingham were early 19th century pottery manufacturers whose flamboyant, ornamental pieces gained royal attention in 1830. While the company closed in 1841, the porcelain remains highly collectable. Freemantle utilised his local links to assemble his collections, for example he discusses locating the pottery with a ‘Mr Charles Drury’. It is understood from his letters that these were briefly removed from his possession in 1923, which he reports be extremely upset by. The collection of Rockingham pottery was bought by the Sheffield Corporation and now also resides at Weston Park Museum.

== Selling the Collections ==
By the late 1890s, Freemantle made the decision to sell his Mendelssohn collection, finding buyer Lord Brotherton by 1928 or 1929. Though Brotherton purchased not only Mendelssohn items but Freemantle’s entire collecting library, including other literature and books on theology and local Yorkshire history. Brotherton did not purchase Freemantle’s coins and seals collection, which now reside at Weston Park Museum, Sheffield.

The Dispersal of His Collections:

Lord Brotherton’s personal librarian John Alexander Symington was in charge of much of Freemantle’s inventory, which he gained full access to after becoming Keeper of the Collection at the University Library. During Symington’s employment, he illicitly sold a large proportion of Mendelssohn materials from the collection to the Library of Congress for personal profit. This included the only copy of Freemantle’s unpublished ‘Mendelssohn Biography’, along with a sizeable collection of correspondence between Freemantle and the Mendelssohn family and an autograph copy of Mendelssohn’s Mid-Summers Night Dream. The sold collection still resides in the Library of Congress. If it was not for this dispersion, Brotherton Library would be one of the leading global institutions for Mendelssohn resources.

== The Sheffield Corporation ==
A founding member of The Sheffield Corporation, he remained on the committee from its creation in 1911 to 1926. Giving two lectures during his time there the first ‘The Call of Templeborough’ on 12 November 1912 and the second ‘Elizabeth Eleanor Siddal (Mrs. D.G Rossetti)’ on 11 February 1913.

== Bibliography ==
- 1876 – The 24th Psalm: The earth is the Lord's/ Composed by Luis Spohr; adapted to the English, from the Original German

- 1879 – A Collection of Kyries, Glorias, Chants, complied, composed, or arranged by W. T. Freemantle

- 1909 – Our local Bibliography

- 1911 – The bibliography of Sheffield and District, Section 1

- 1913 – Templeborough: A Roman Station

- 1918 – The Rev. Alfred Gatty, D.D., Vicar of Ecclesfield: a bibliography.

- 1919 – The Bennett Family: Sterndale Bennett in Sheffield

- Unpublished - 1800–1839. Life of Berlioz' Biography by W. T. Freemantle: Bibliography, Correspondence and notes. (co-writer B. Hector)

- Unpublished Biography of Mendelssohn
