= Fremantle-class patrol boat =

Patrol boat class of the Royal Australian Navy

Fremantle class
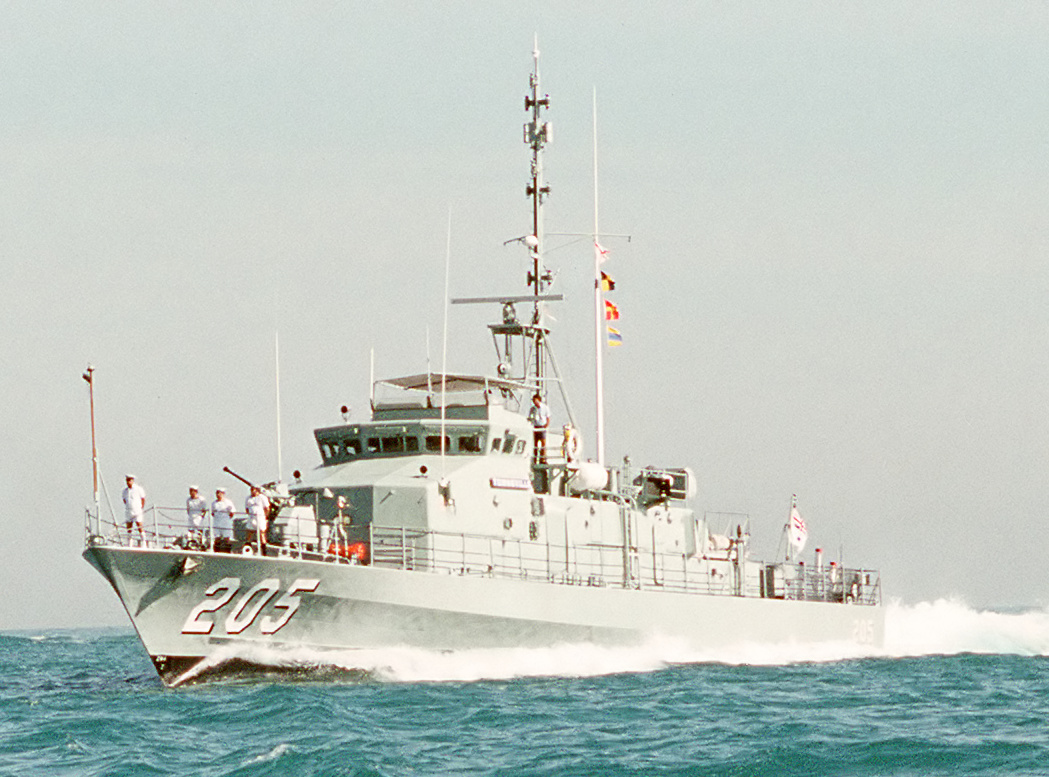
- HMAS Townsville in 1990

Class overview
- Name: Fremantle class
- Builders: Brooke Marine (lead ship); NQEA
- Operators: Royal Australian Navy
- Preceded by: Attack class
- Succeeded by: Armidale class
- Built: 1977–1984
- In commission: 1979–2007
- Completed: 15
- Cancelled: 5
- Retired: 15
- Scrapped: 13
- Preserved: 2 (as museum ships)

General characteristics
- Type: Patrol boat
- Displacement: 220 tons
- Length: 41.9 m (137 ft 6 in)
- Beam: 7.70 m (25 ft 3 in)
- Draught: 1.75 m (5 ft 9 in)
- Propulsion: 2 MTU series 538 TB91 V16 diesel engines, 3,200 shp (2,400 kW), 2 propellers
- Speed: 30 knots (56 km/h; 35 mph)
- Range: 5,000 nmi (9,300 km; 5,800 mi) at 5 knots (9.3 km/h; 5.8 mph)
- Complement: 22
- Armament: 1 Bofors 40 mm/60 gun; 2 12.7 mm machine guns; 1 81 mm mortar (removed later)

The Fremantle-class patrol boats were coastal patrol vessels operated by the Royal Australian Navy (RAN) from 1979 to 2007. Designed by British shipbuilder Brooke Marine and constructed in Australia by NQEA, the Fremantle class were larger, more powerful, and more capable than the preceding Attack class, and the two primary patrol boat bases required infrastructure upgrades to support them. Although up to 30 vessels were planned, fifteen were ordered and constructed, with an unexercised option for five more.

Their retirement was announced in 2001 and a decommissioning schedule published in 2004. From May 2005 they were replaced by the Armidale-class patrol boats with the last two Fremantles decommissioning in May 2007. Most of the class were scrapped, with two marked for preservation as museum ships. The Fremantle class has also appeared in two drama television series based on the Royal Australian Navy.

== Planning and development ==
The concept for the Fremantle class began somewhere between 1967 and 1969, as the Attack-class patrol boats entered service, and areas for improvement were observed. In September 1970, the RAN announced the intention to construct ten new patrol boats, which would operate in tandem with the Attack class and replace two general purpose vessels. These new vessels were intended to enter service between 1976 and 1980. The number of vessels to be built fluctuated, peaking at thirty vessels (16 RAN, 4 Royal Australian Naval Reserve, and 10 for the military of Papua New Guinea), and settling at fifteen.

Plans of acquisition were announced in April 1975, with eleven shipbuilders submitting tenders, of which two were shortlisted in 1976; Brooke Marine of England and Lürssen Werft of West Germany. Brooke Marine won the contract to design and produce the lead ship, with NQEA contracted to build the other fourteen vessels. An option for an additional five vessels existed, but they were placed on indefinite hold in 1982. There was a separate acquisition plan for six missile-armed variants, but this was suspended due to the lack of available funding, and the belief that such ships could be constructed on short notice if required.

== Design and construction ==
The design of the Fremantle class called for ships with improved seakeeping, and newer equipment and weapons than those fitted to the Attack class. The Fremantles had a full load displacement of 220 tonnes (220 long tons), were 41.9 metres (137 ft 6 in) long overall, had a beam of 7.39 metres (24 ft 3 in), and a maximum draught of 1.75 metres (5 ft 9 in). The Fremantles were 28% longer and 50% heavier than their predecessors. During sea trials, NUSHIP Fremantle was revealed to be 20 tons over the contracted limit. Main propulsion machinery consisted of two MTU series 538 diesel engines, which supplied 3,200 shaft horsepower (2,400 kW) to the two propeller shafts. They also had an APU (an Auxiliary Propulsion Unit that was fitted in the interest of fuel saving whilst on patrol: One Dorman 12-cylinder auxiliary propulsion engine.) These were later removed as they proved inefficient when compared to the two main engines Exhaust was not expelled through a funnel, like most ships, but through vents below the waterline. The patrol boat could reach a maximum speed of 30 knots (56 km/h; 35 mph), and had a maximum range of 5,000 nautical miles (9,300 km; 5,800 mi) at 5 knots (9.3 km/h; 5.8 mph). The ship's company consisted of 22 personnel. Each patrol boat was armed with a single, bow-mounted Bofors 40 mm L/60 gun as main armament, supplemented by two .50-calibre Browning machineguns and an 81 mm mortar, although the mortar was removed from all ships sometime in the late 1990s. The main weapon was originally to be two 30-mm guns on a twin-mount, but the reconditioned Bofors were selected to keep costs down; provision was made to install an updated weapon later in the class' service life, but this did not eventuate.

Early on in the construction program, it was realised that the two main patrol boat bases, HMAS Cairns in Cairns, Queensland and HMAS Coonawarra in Darwin, Northern Territory, were not capable of supporting ships of this size on a permanent basis. This resulted in a $10 million infrastructure upgrade for the two bases, which was completed in 1981 and 1982, respectively. This included modern maintenance, logistic, and administrative facilities at both bases, and the installation of a synchro-lift at Coonawarra.

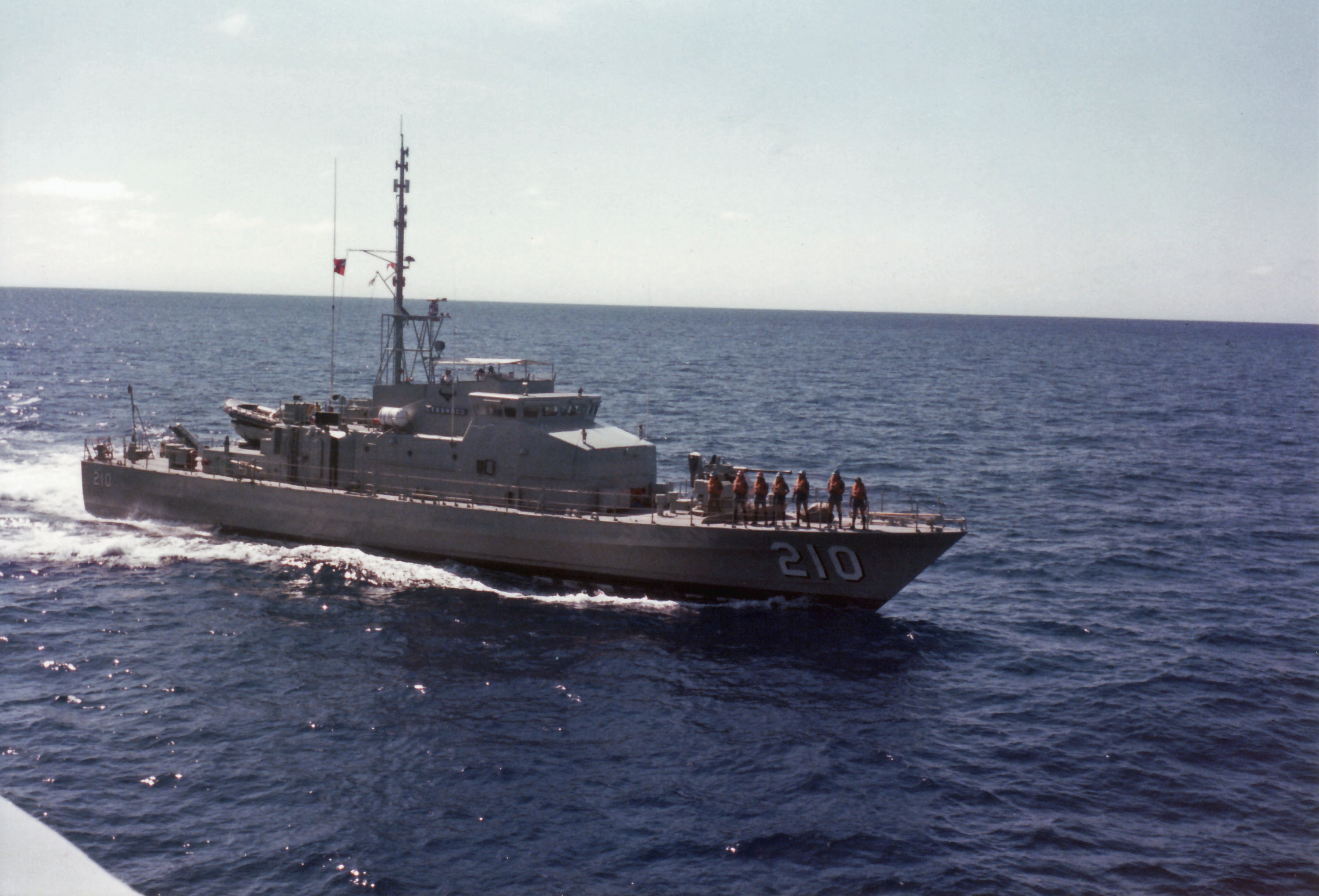
Cessnock underway in the mid-1980s

Construction of Fremantle began in October 1977. It was launched on 16 February 1979, and commissioned on 17 March 1980. During sea trials, Fremantle received distinction for locating and rescuing a British sailor thrown from a commercial trawler following its collision with an oil tender. Construction of the first Australian-built vessel, HMAS Warrnambool, began in September 1978, with Warrnambool launched on 25 October 1980 and commissioned on 14 March 1981. The final ship of the class, HMAS Bunbury, was commissioned on 15 December 1984. The Australian-built vessels were built through an assembly-line method. Hulls were built upside-down from the keel to the second-uppermost deck, then rolled over and built to the top of the hull. After this, the superstructure, which had been fabricated at the same time, was welded onto the hull. Construction of the class (including the two naval base upgrades) cost $150 million. All fifteen vessels were named after Bathurst-class corvettes.

== Operational history ==
The first ship of the class, HMAS Fremantle, arrived in Australia on 27 August 1980, after an 82-day voyage covering 14,509 nautical miles (26,871 km; 16,697 mi). NQEA completed three patrol boats in both 1981 and 1982, and four in both 1983 and 1984. By the end of 1984, four Fremantles were located at HMAS Coonawarra, HMAS Cairns, and Fleet Base East, two at HMAS Stirling, and one at HMAS Cerberus. Also by 1984, all of the Attack class had left active service, with many transferring to the RAN Reserve or the Indonesian Navy.

On 31 May 1985, Wollongong grounded on rocks at Gabo Island, causing extensive damage to the vessel. It was repaired by the builder, and returned to service in late 1986.

From May 2005 onwards, the Fremantles were replaced in service by the fourteen Armidale-class patrol boats. During late 2006, the decommissioned Wollongong remained laid up alongside Waterhen in Waverton, Sydney for use as the alongside set for the drama series Sea Patrol. The last two ships, Townsville and Ipswich, decommissioned in a joint ceremony on 11 May 2007.

== Fate ==
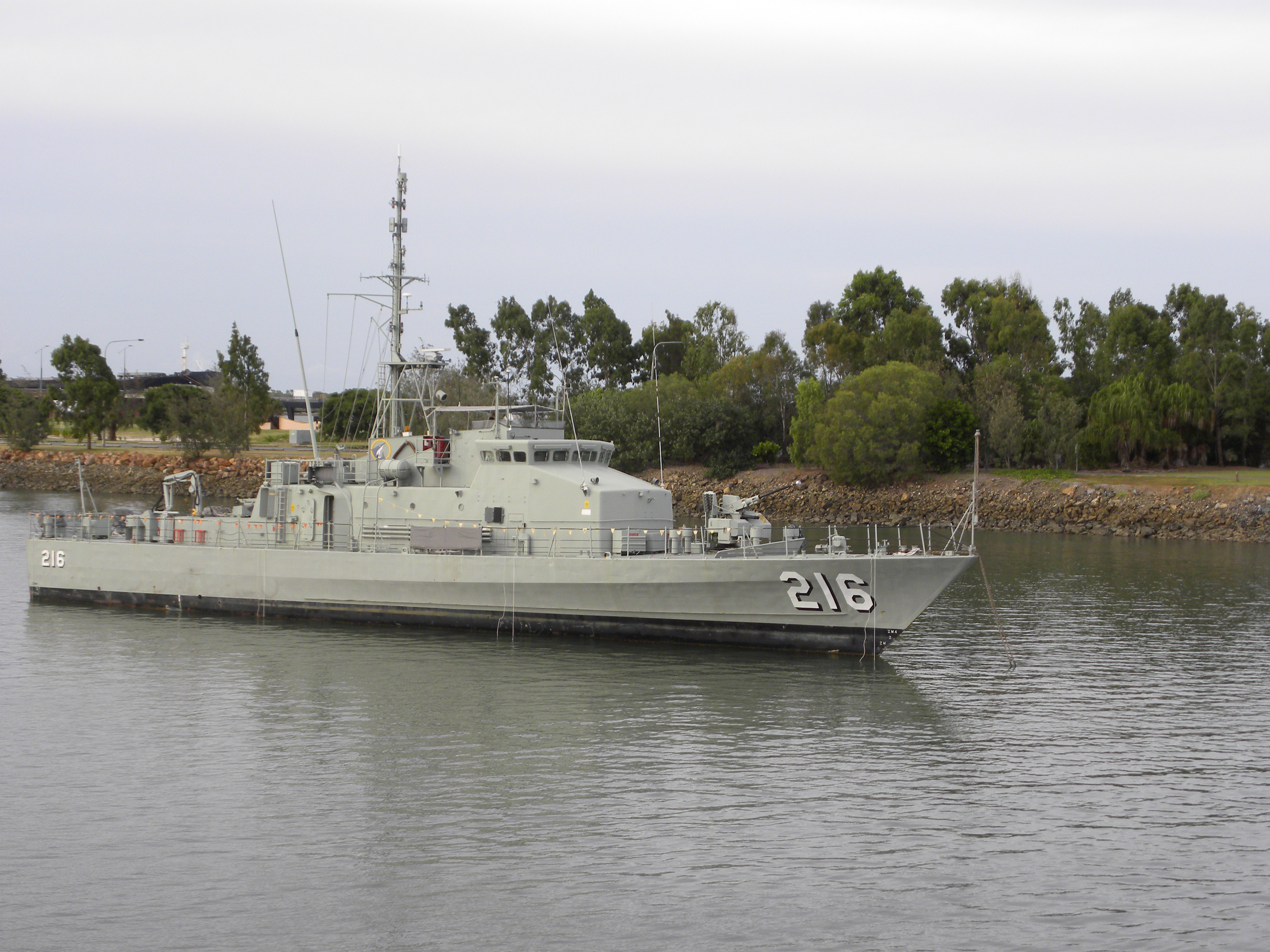
Gladstone in 2010, awaiting preservation in its namesake city

During 2006 and 2007, most of the Fremantles were broken up for scrap in Darwin, at a cost of between $400,000 and $450,000 each to the Australian government. A total of 11 of the class were dismantled at Darwin, although the MTU engines were salvaged and sold on market, and some high value item were also saved. The exceptions were Wollongong (which was instead scrapped in Port Macquarie), Townsville (gifted to the Townsville Maritime Historical Society for preservation as a museum ship), and Gladstone (gifted to the Gladstone Maritime Museum for preservation).

== Fremantle class in fiction ==
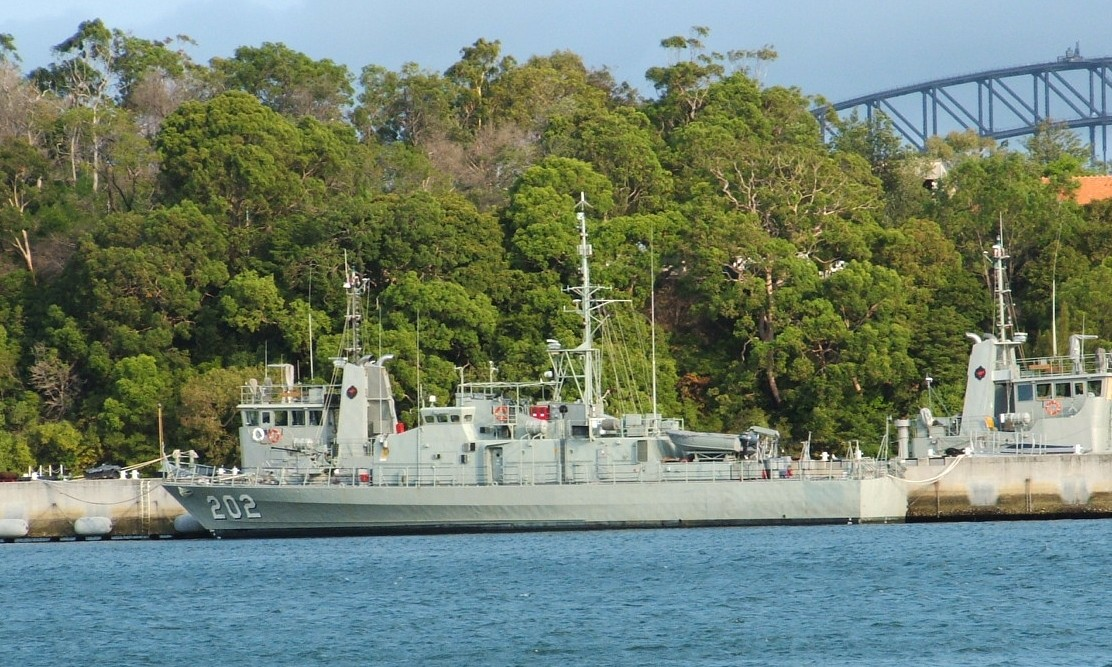
HMAS Hammersley alongside at HMAS Waterhen

The fictional HMAS Defiance, portrayed by HMA Ships Launceston, Townsville, Warrnambool, Whyalla, and Wollongong featured in the second season of the Australian Broadcasting Corporation television series Patrol Boat.

The fictional HMAS Hammersley is the setting of the first season of Channel Nine's 2007 drama series Sea Patrol. This vessel was portrayed by HMA Ships Wollongong and Ipswich. A second patrol boat, HMAS Kingston, also appears in the series. From the second season onwards, an Armidale-class boat is used.

== Ships ==
No.	Name	Laid Down	Launched	Commissioned	Decommissioning
FCPB 203	Fremantle	11 November 1977	15 February 1979	17 March 1980	11 August 2006
FCPB 204	Warrnambool	30 September 1978	25 October 1980	14 March 1981	29 November 2005
FCPB 205	Townsville	5 March 1979	16 May 1981	18 July 1981	11 May 2007
FCPB 206	Wollongong	23 July 1979	17 October 1981	28 November 1981	11 February 2006
FCPB 207	Launceston	29 March 1980	23 January 1982	1 March 1982	8 September 2006
FCPB 208	Whyalla	13 July 1980	22 May 1982	3 July 1982	2 September 2005
FCPB 209	Ipswich	29 October 1980	25 September 1982	13 November 1982	11 May 2007
FCPB 210	Cessnock	9 March 1981	15 January 1983	5 March 1983	23 June 2005
FCPB 211	Bendigo	21 September 1981	9 April 1983	28 May 1983	9 September 2006
FCPB 212	Gawler	18 January 1982	9 July 1983	27 August 1983	8 July 2006
FCPB 213	Geraldton	3 May 1982	22 October 1983	10 December 1983	7 October 2006
FCPB 214	Dubbo	9 August 1982	21 January 1984	10 March 1984	2 February 2007
FCPB 215	Geelong	15 November 1982	14 April 1984	2 June 1984	8 July 2006
FCPB 216	Gladstone	7 March 1983	28 July 1984	8 September 1984	13 March 2007
FCPB 217	Bunbury	13 June 1983	3 November 1984	15 December 1984	11 February 2006
