= List of ships of the Victorian Naval Forces =

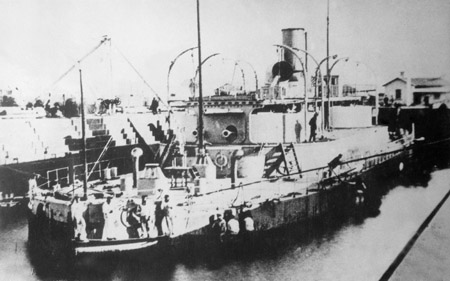
HMVS Cerberus

List of Ships of the Victorian Naval Forces, 1855–1901:

== A ==
Name	Type	Class	Dates	Notes
Albert	Gunboat		1884–1897	

== B ==
Name	Type	Class	Dates	Notes
Batman	Auxiliary gunboat		1884–unknown	
Burrumbeet	Auxiliary armed steamer			

== C ==
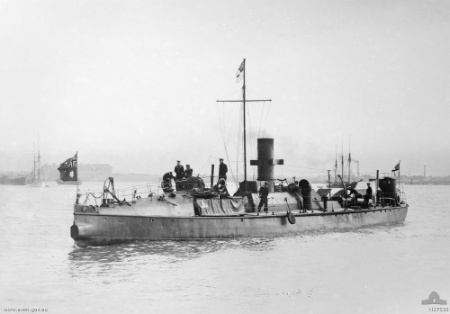
HMAS Countess of Hopetoun in 1914

Name	Type	Class	Dates	Notes
Cerberus	Turret ship (monitor)		1869–1924	
Childers	1st class Torpedo boat		1884–1918	
Commissioner	Auxiliary torpedo boat			
Countess of Hopetoun	1st class Torpedo Boat		1891–1924	
Courier	Auxiliary armed steamer			
Customs Number 1	Auxiliary torpedo boat			

== E ==
Name	Type	Class	Dates	Notes
Elingamite	Auxiliary armed steamer			

== F ==
Name	Type	Class	Dates	Notes
Fawker	Auxiliary gunboat		1883–unknown	

== G ==
Name	Type	Class	Dates	Notes
Gannet	Auxiliary gunboat		1884–1893	
Gordon	Torpedo boat		1884–1914	

== L ==
Name	Type	Class	Dates	Notes
Lady Loch	Gunboat		1886–unknown	
Lion	Auxiliary armed launch			
Lonsdale	Torpedo boat		1884–1912-1913	

== N ==
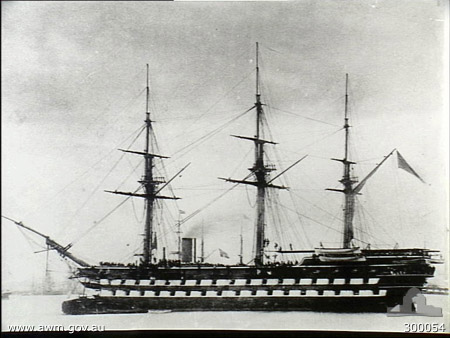
HMVS Nelson

Name	Type	Class	Dates	Notes
Nelson	Training ship		1867–1898	
Nepean	Torpedo boat		1884–1912-1913	

== V ==
Name	Type	Class	Dates	Notes
Victoria (I)	Steam sloop		1855–1880	
Victoria (II)	Gunboat		1884–1896	
Vulcan	Auxiliary		1889–unknown	
