= HMQS Mosquito =

Australian naval vessel

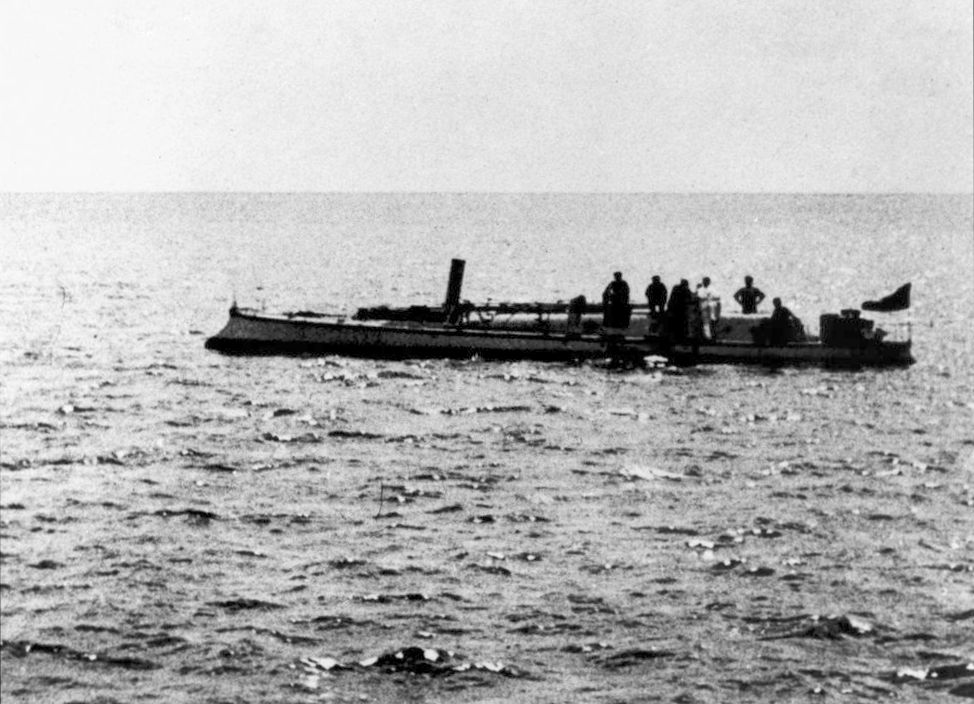
- Mosquito in 1901

History

Queensland and Australia
- Builder: Thornycroft of Chiswick
- Launched: 16 July 1884
- In service: 1885
- Out of service: 1910
- Homeport: Brisbane, Queensland
- Fate: Scrapped

General characteristics
- Displacement: 12 tons
- Length: 63 ft (19 m)
- Beam: 7 ft 6 in (2.29 m)
- Speed: 17 knots (31 km/h; 20 mph)
- Complement: 7
- Armament: 2 sets of dropping gear for 14-inch torpedoes.

HMQS Mosquito was a torpedo boat operated by the Queensland Maritime Defence Force and Commonwealth Naval Forces. She entered service in 1885 and after Federation was transferred to the Commonwealth Naval Forces, serving as a training vessel until she was paid off in 1910.

== Construction and design ==
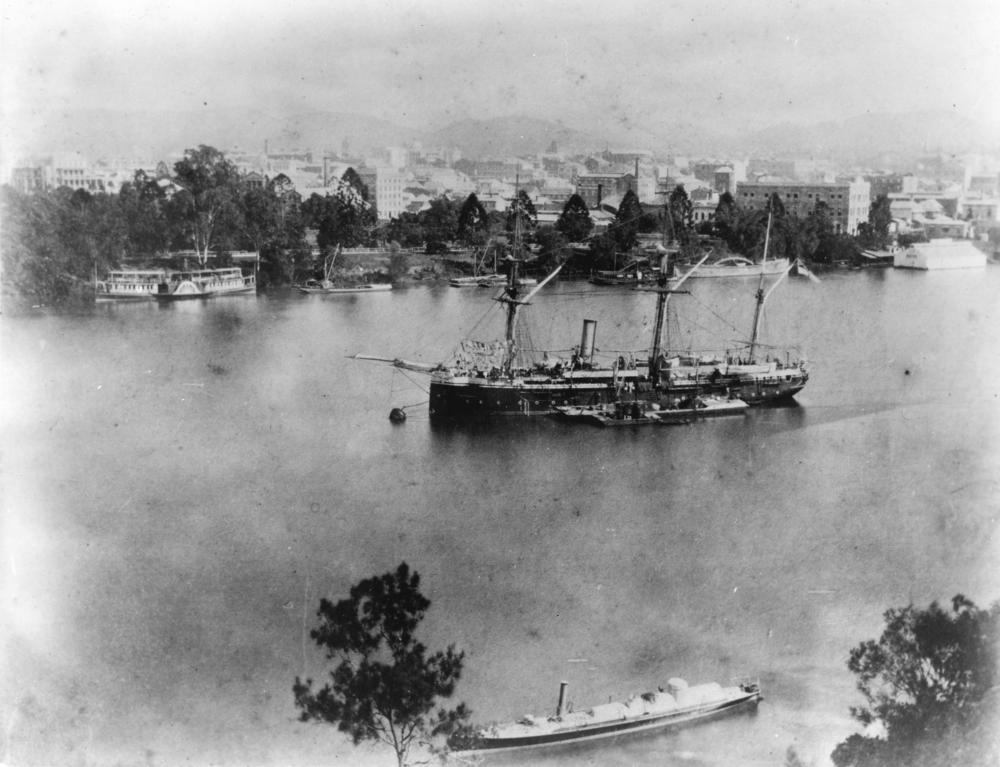
Several ships on the Brisbane River in 1889. Mosquito is near the bottom edge of the image

Following the Jervois-Scratchley reports the colonial governments of Australia restructured their defence forces. One of the outcomes of the report was the formation of the Queensland Maritime Defence Force. To equip the new force two gunboats and a torpedo boat were initially purchased.

Constructed by Thornycroft of Chiswick, HMQS Mosquito was launched on 16 July 1884, having been before being completed in 1885. With a galvanised steel hull, she was designed with a top speed of 21 knots; however, was only able to achieve 17.21 knots during trials. The ship was built to a standard design; TB 191 of Tasmania and the New Zealand Defender-class torpedo boats were identical. Lonsdale and Nepean of Victoria, built in 1883–1884, were also identical, except in mounting fixed torpedo tubes. Displacing 12 tons, she was 63 feet (19 m) long, and had a 7.5-foot (2.3 m) beam. She had a complement of seven and was equipped with two sets of dropping gear for 14-inch torpedoes. Construction cost 3,500 pounds sterling.

== Service history ==
Mosquito was subsequently transported to Australia as deck cargo by an East India Company steamer. She was subsequently based at facilities constructed at the bottom of the cliffs of the western side of Kangaroo Point, on the Brisbane River. She was never commissioned but simply placed into service when required, as she had no crew accommodation facilities, and therefore spent much of her time out of the water. Following Federation in 1901, Mosquito was transferred to the new Commonwealth Naval Forces and was employed as a training vessel until she was paid off in 1910. Her fittings and engines were removed before being abandoned in Boggy Creek near Pinkenba. Parts of her hull were discovered in January 1966 and an archaeological survey of the remains was conducted in 2009; the stern casemate was recovered and is in the collection of the Queensland Museum.

== See also ==
- List of Queensland Maritime Defence Force ships
- Colonial navies of Australia – Queensland
