= HMQS Paluma =

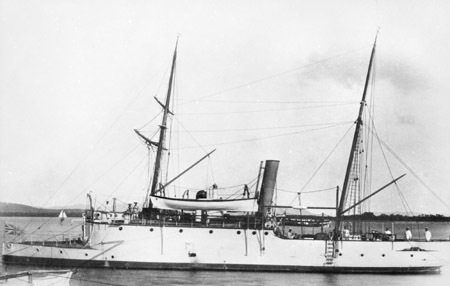
- HMQS Paluma in 1889

History

United Kingdom
- Name: Paluma
- Namesake: Aboriginal word for "thunder"
- Builder: Sir W.G. Armstrong, Mitchell & Co, Newcastle-on-Tyne
- Cost: £35,000
- Commissioned: 28 October 1884
- Fate: Transferred to the Queensland Maritime Defence Force in 1892

Queensland
- Name: Paluma
- Namesake: Aboriginal word for "thunder"
- Acquired: 1892
- Fate: Transferred to Commonwealth Naval Forces in 1901

Australia
- Name: Paluma
- Namesake: Aboriginal word for "thunder"
- Acquired: 1901
- Decommissioned: 1916
- Fate: Scrapped in 1950–51

General characteristics
- Class & type: Armstrong type B1 flat-iron gunboat
- Displacement: 360 tons
- Length: 120 ft (37 m)
- Beam: 26 ft (7.9 m)
- Draught: 9 ft 6 in (2.90 m)
- Installed power: 400 ihp (298 kW)
- Propulsion: 2 shaft horizontal direct action compound steam engines
- Speed: 10.5 knots (19.4 km/h; 12.1 mph)
- Range: 700 to 800 mi (1,100 to 1,300 km)
- Endurance: 75 tons of coal
- Complement: 55
- Armament: 1 × BL 8-inch (203.2 mm) gun (replaced in 1899 by 2 × BL 5-inch guns); 1 × BL 6-inch (152.4 mm) gun (replaced in 1901 by 1× QF 4.7-inch gun); 2 × 1.5-inch Nordenfelt guns; 1 × .45-inch (5-barrel) machine gun; 1 × 1-inch (4-barrel) machine gun

HMQS Paluma was a flat-iron gunboat operated by the Queensland Maritime Defence Force and later the Royal Australian Navy (as HMAS Paluma). She entered service on 28 October 1884, was decommissioned in 1916 and then sold to the Victorian Ports and Harbours Department, who operated her under the name Rip until 1948 when she was retired. She was scrapped in 1950–51.

== Construction ==
Following the Jervois-Scratchley reports the colonial governments of Australia restructured their defence forces. One of the many outcomes of this report was the formation of the Queensland Maritime Defence Force. To equip the new force, the colonial government purchased two gunboats and a torpedo boat. Paluma was the second of the two gunboats purchased by the colony and was a sister ship of HMQS Gayundah, which together formed the Gayundah class. This class was built to a type B1 flat-iron gunboat design from builders Sir W.G. Armstrong, Mitchell & Co at Newcastle-on-Tyne. They were improved, slightly larger versions of HMVS Albert which was also built in 1884 for the colony of Victoria.

The ship displaced 360 tons, and she was 120 feet (37 m) long, had a 26-foot (7.9 m) beam and a draught of 9.5 feet (2.9 m). Paluma was propelled by horizontal direct action compound steam engines, which drove two screws that were capable of producing 400 ihp (298 kW), with bunkerage for 75 tons of coal, which gave her a range of 700 to 800 mi (1,100 to 1,300 km) at a cruising speed of 10.5 knots (19.4 km/h; 12.1 mph). She also had sails to back up her engines. As designed, her armament included a BL 8-inch (203.2 mm) gun, although this was never fitted. Instead she was fitted with one BL 6-inch (152.4 mm) gun, two 1.5-inch Nordenfelt guns and two machine guns. The 6-inch gun was removed in 1885 and remounted 10 years later, when two 5-inch guns were also added. In 1901, a 4.7-inch gun replaced the 6-inch. She had a crew of 55.

She was lent upon completion to the Royal Navy. Commissioned in the United Kingdom as HMS Paluma during October 1884, she arrived in Brisbane on 7 May 1885. Construction cost 35,000 pounds sterling. The ship's name was the Aboriginal word for "thunder".

== Operational history ==
Over the next eight years, Paluma conducted survey work on the Great Barrier Reef for the Admiralty. The 1893 Brisbane flood ripped Paluma from her moorings and left her well above the high water mark in the nearby botanical gardens. As locals considered how to return her to the Brisbane River, another major flood two weeks later refloated the gunboat, and she was pulled clear without any significant damage. The depression of the 1890s saw Paluma and her sister placed in reserve, being reactivated for annual training at Easter. In 1895, she was returned to the Queensland Government.

With the federation of the Australian colonies, Paluma joined the Commonwealth Naval Forces in 1901, and in 1911 was integrated into the newly formed Royal Australian Navy along with her sister ship. During World War I, Paluma was employed mainly around Sydney Harbour, before being sold in 1916 to the Victorian Ports and Harbours Department who renamed her Rip. In Victoria, the ship served in Port Phillip as a tender. In 1948, she was retired, having been replaced the previous year by the converted Bathurst-class corvette HMAS Whyalla. Paluma was laid up at Footscray, Victoria, and was scrapped in 1950–51.

== See also ==
- Colonial navies of Australia – Queensland
- List of Queensland Maritime Defence Force ships
