= HMQS Gayundah =

Australian flat-iron gunboat

Coordinates: 27.262°S 153.10713°E

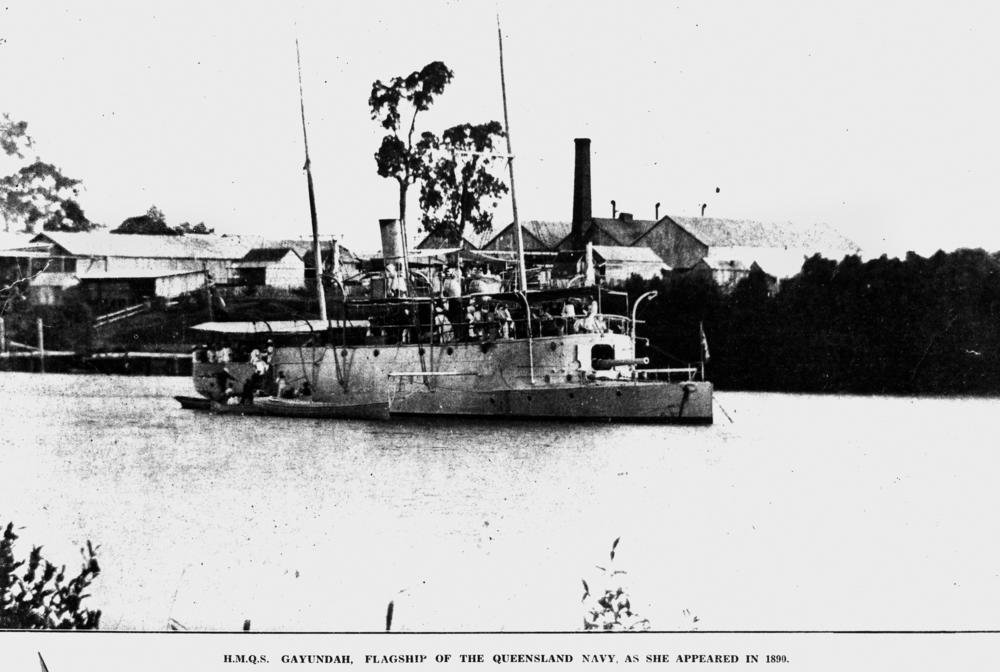
- HMQS Gayundah in 1890

History

Queensland
- Name: Gayundah
- Namesake: Aboriginal word for "lightning"
- Builder: Sir W.G. Armstrong, Mitchell & Co, Newcastle-on-Tyne
- Cost: £35,000
- Launched: 13 May 1884
- Commissioned: 28 October 1884
- Fate: Transferred to Commonwealth Naval Forces 1901

History

Australia
- Name: Gayundah
- Namesake: Aboriginal word for "lightning"
- Acquired: 1901
- Decommissioned: 23 August 1918
- Fate: Sold for civilian use 1921. Breakwater since 1958

General characteristics
- Class & type: Armstrong type B1 flat-iron gunboat
- Displacement: 360 tons
- Length: 120 ft (37 m)
- Beam: 26 ft (7.9 m)
- Draught: 9 ft 6 in (2.90 m)
- Installed power: 400 ihp (298 kW)
- Propulsion: 2 shaft horizontal direct action compound steam engines
- Speed: 10.5 knots (19.4 km/h; 12.1 mph)
- Range: 700 to 800 mi (1,100 to 1,300 km)
- Endurance: 75 tons of coal
- Complement: 55
- Armament: as built: 1 × BL 8-inch (203.2 mm) gun; 1 × BL 6-inch (152.4 mm) gun; 2 × 1.5-inch Nordenfelt guns; 2 × machine guns; after 1899 refit: 1 × BL 6-inch (152.4 mm) gun (later removed in 1914); 1 × QF 4.7-inch gun; 2 × QF 12-pounder guns; 2 × machine guns

HMQS Gayundah was a flat-iron gunboat operated by the Queensland Maritime Defence Force and later the Royal Australian Navy (as HMAS Gayundah). She entered service in 1884 and was decommissioned and sold to a civilian company in 1921. She then served as sand and gravel barge in Brisbane until the 1950s, when she was scrapped. In 1958, Gayundah was run aground at Woody Point near Redcliffe, to serve as a breakwater structure.

== Construction ==
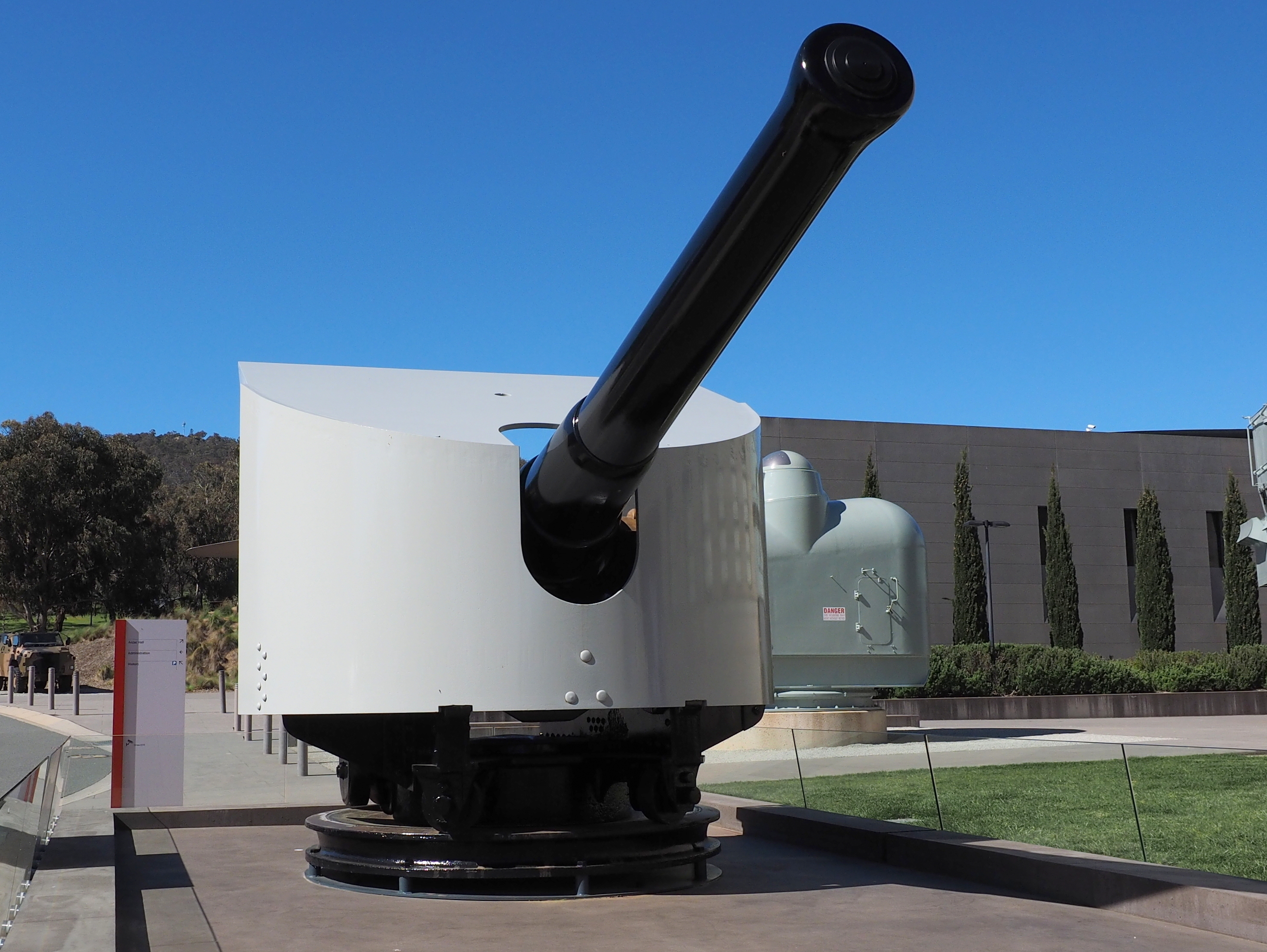
Gayundah's BL 6 inch 80 pounder gun on display outside the Australian War Memorial in 2016

In the 1870s the British military presence in Australia had declined and the individual colonies had begun planning for their own defence, culminating in the Jervois-Scratchley reports. Amidst concerns about Russian influence in the Pacific, in 1884 the Queensland Maritime Defence Force was established. The same year, the colony placed an order for its first vessels: a torpedo boat, HMQS Mosquito, and two gunboats, Gayundah and HMQS Paluma. Both Gayundah and Paluma belonged to a class of vessels that were built to a type B1 flat-iron gunboat design by builders Sir W.G. Armstrong, Mitchell & Co. The very similar HMVS Albert was also built in 1884 and served with the colony of Victoria.

The ship displaced 360 tons, and she was 120 feet (37 m) long, had a 26-foot (7.9 m) beam and a draught of 9.5 feet (2.9 m). Gayundah was propelled by horizontal direct action compound steam engines, which drove two screws that were capable of producing 400 ihp (298 kW), giving her a range of 700 to 800 mi (1,100 to 1,300 km) at a cruising speed of 10.5 knots (19.4 km/h; 12.1 mph). She also had sails to back up her engines. As built, her armament consisted of one BL 8-inch (203.2 mm) gun, one BL 6-inch (152.4 mm) gun, two 1.5-inch Nordenfelt guns and two machine guns. She had a complement of 55 men all ranks; her name was an Aboriginal word for "lightning".

HMQS Gayundah was launched at Newcastle upon Tyne on 13 May 1884 and commissioned in the United Kingdom during October after completing trials. Construction cost 35,000 pounds sterling. Gayundah sailed for Australia in November 1884, under the command of Captain Henry Townley Wright. Having travelled via the Suez Canal, the ship arrived at Brisbane on 27 March 1885.

== Operational history ==
During the first years of the gunboat's operation, Wright, who was also the head of the Queensland Maritime Defence Force, found that his expenses exceeded his salary, and turned to appropriating government stores and alcohol for his own use. This, along with his conduct and attitude towards running the colony's navy prompted the Queensland government to seek his removal in late 1887, although plans to immediately dismiss him were cancelled and it was determined that Wright was kept on until his appointment concluded at the end of 1888, with the proviso that he had not authority to acquire stores for Gayundah. In September 1888, Wright sought a leave of absence until the end of the year and the payment of his remaining salary as a lump sum: the former was agreed to, but Wright's pay would continue to occur monthly, and he was ordered to turn Gayundah over to his second in command, Lieutenant Francis Pringle Taylor.

In response, Wright threatened to report what he saw as an insult to his position to the Admiralty, and had the gunboat loaded with coal and stores, ready to depart for Sydney. On 24 October, the Under Colonial Secretary instructed Taylor to take command of the ship. Wright interpreted Taylor's actions as a mutiny, had him arrested, wrote several letters of protest to his superiors and others, ordered Gayundah's aft 6-inch gun to be aimed at the Queensland Parliament, and threatened to take the gunboat to sea if further challenges to his authority were made. The colonial government dismissed him from his roles within the Maritime Defence Force, and a party of Queensland police boarded the ship with the intention of removing Wright by force if necessary. After failing to order them off his ship, Wright composed another letter of protest, released Taylor, and allowed himself to be escorted ashore by the police.

Over the next few years, Gayundah served as a training ship, and conducted the first ship to shore radio transmissions in Australia. However, with the depression of the 1890s, Gayundah was assigned to reserve duties in 1892, being reactivated yearly for Easter training. In 1899, the ship was refitted and her armament updated, with the 6-inch BL being replaced by a QF 4.7-inch gun and the two Nordenfelts being replaced by two QF 12-pounder guns.

Following the Federation of Australia, Gayundah and sister ship HMQS Paluma joined the Commonwealth Naval Forces in 1901. On 9 April 1903, the Gayundah transmitted the first wireless message received from a ship at sea to an Australian wireless station. The historic message sent to the receiving station in Brisbane read: "Gun drill continued this afternoon and was fairly successful – blowing squally and raining – prize firing tomorrow. Marconi insulators were interfered with by rain but easily rectified and communication since has been good. Good night." The ship's aerial was a tall bamboo pole lashed to the mast.

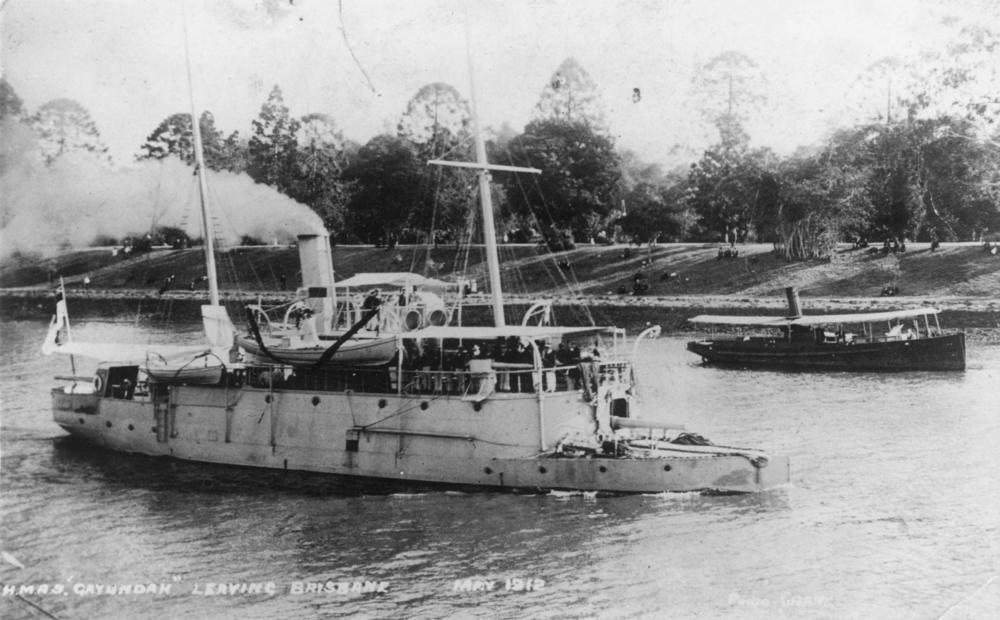
HMAS Gayundah in 1912

In March 1911, the Commonwealth Naval Forces became the Royal Australian Navy and Gayundah was redesignated HMAS Gayundah. From 22 April to 25 August 1911, at the instigation of the Departments of External Affairs and Trade & Customs, Gayundah sailed under the command of Commander G.A.H. Curtis from Brisbane to Broome, Western Australia, to enforce Australia's territorial boundary and fishing zone along the north-west coast of the continent. At Scott Reef, on 25 May, Gayundah boarded and detained two Dutch schooners with illegal catches of trepang (sea cucumber) and trochus shell, and escorted them into Broome on 29 May. She remained at Broome until mid-July so the ship's officers could appear as witnesses in the resulting court case against the masters of the schooners. For this cruise, the 6-inch bow gun was removed to provide greater bunkering for coal and thereby increase the ship's range.

Between January and August 1914 Gayundah underwent a significant refit at the Cockatoo Dockyard in Sydney. Changes during this time included work on her forecastle, improvement of her accommodation and sea-keeping characteristics, and the replacement of her 8-inch gun by a 4.7-inch gun. With the outbreak of World War I, Gayundah was assigned to coastal patrols of Moreton Bay and the east coast of Australia. In July 1915, one of Gayundah's 12-pounder guns was removed. In 1917, due to the threat posed by German raiders such as SMS Seeadler, Gayundah patrolled off Port Jackson and in the Spencer Gulf, although she made no contact with enemy ships during this time.

== Decommissioning and fate ==
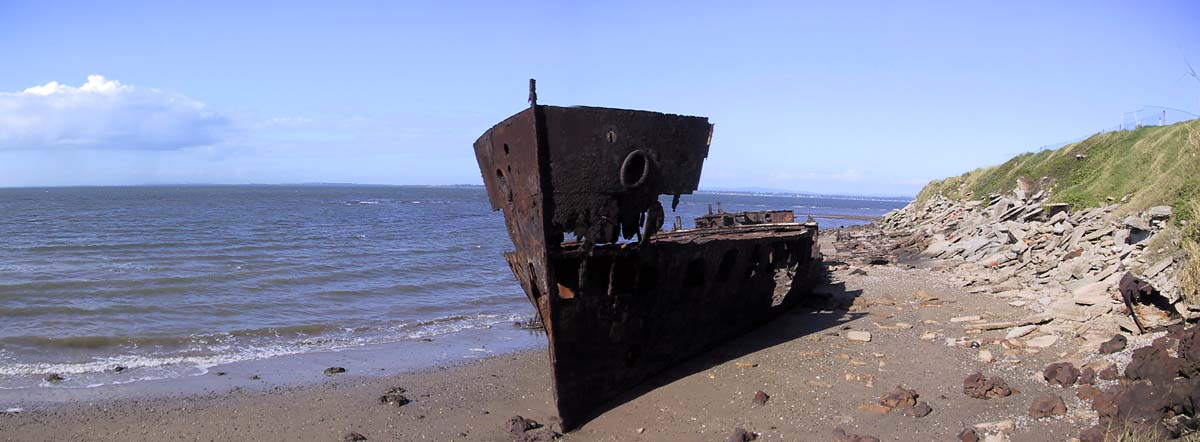
Gayundah beached off Woody Point, as seen in 2006

Having reached the end of her naval career, Gayundah was paid off on 23 August 1918 in Melbourne. In 1921, she was sold to a civilian company, Brisbane Gravel Pty Ltd. Returning to Queensland, she was used to haul sand and gravel on the Brisbane River. In October 1930, while moored at Melton Reach, Gayundah sank, although she was raised soon after. She remained in service into the 1950s, when the decision was made to sell her for scrap. Early in 1958 she was taken to Bulimba Wharf under tow and stripped. The hull was later sold to the Redcliffe Town Council. Gayundah was beached on 2 June 1958, and now serves as a breakwater off the Woody Point cliffs near Redcliffe.

The guns were subsequently used for coastal defence. The 6 inch gun is preserved at the Australian War Memorial, as is a scale model of the ship acquired from Armstrong Whitworth & Co. Ltd. in 1925.

== See also ==
- List of Queensland Maritime Defence Force ships
