= Suakin =

City on the Red Sea coast in Sudan

Suakin سواكن Oosook
- City
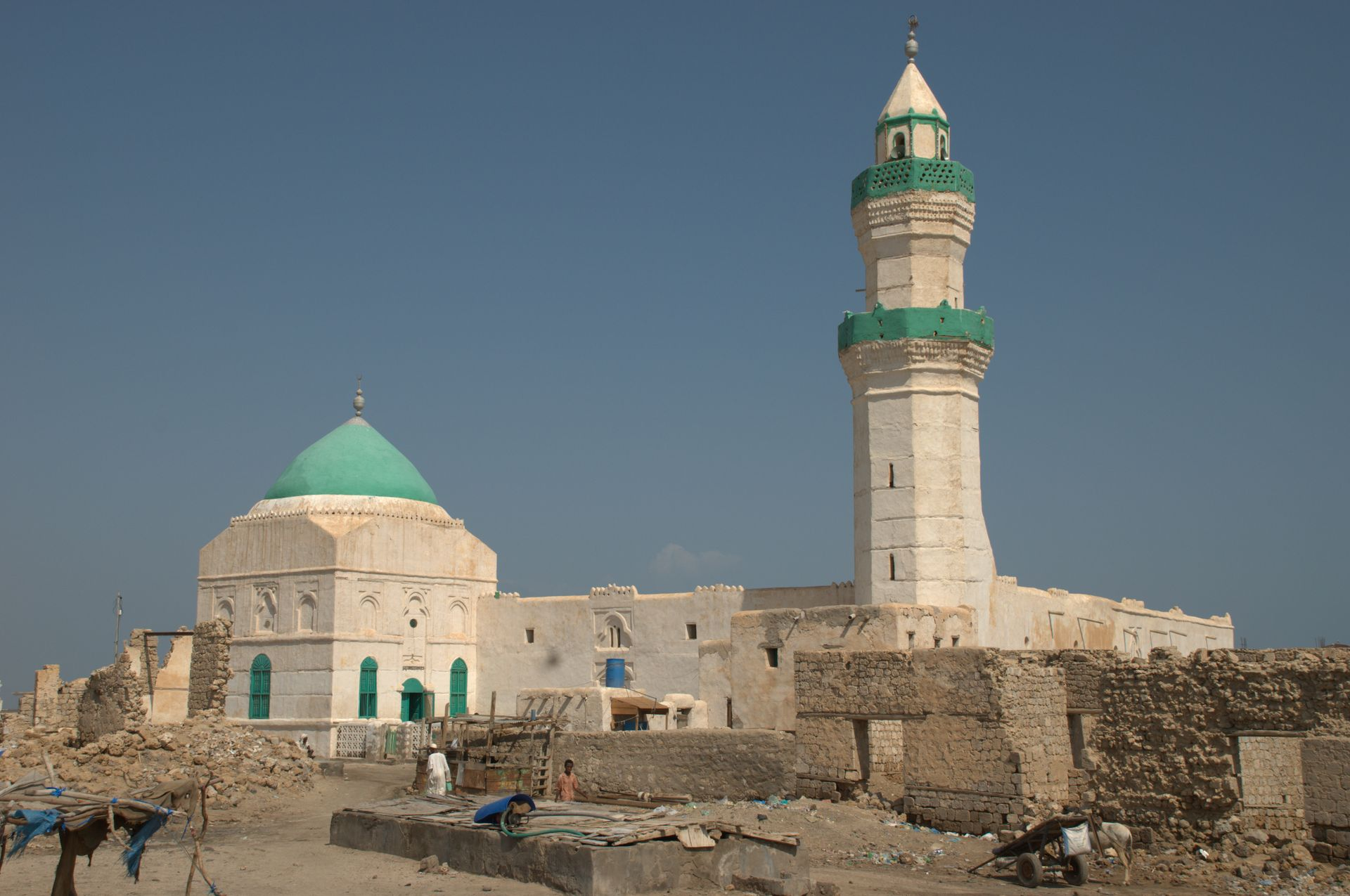
- Suakin, El-Geyf mosque
- Interactive map of Suakin
- Location in Sudan
- Coordinates: 19°06′09″N 37°19′48″E
- Country: Sudan
- State: Red Sea State
- District: Port Sudan

Population (2008)
  - Total: 82,150

Designations

Ramsar Wetland
- Official name: Suakin-Gulf of Agig
- Designated: 2 February 2009
- Reference no.: 1860

Suakin or Sawakin (Arabic: سواكن, Sawākin; Beja: Oosook) is a port city in northeastern Sudan, on the west coast of the Red Sea. It was formerly the region's chief port, but is now secondary to Port Sudan, about 50 kilometres (30 mi) north.

Suakin used to be considered the height of medieval luxury on the Red Sea, but the old city built of coral is now in ruins. In 1983, the adjacent historic mainland town, known as the Geyf, had a population of 18,030. In 2008, Suakin had a population of 82,150 according to the census of the same year. Ferries run daily from Suakin to Jeddah in Saudi Arabia.

== Etymology ==
The Beja name for Suakin is Oosook. This is possibly from the Arabic word suq, meaning market. In Beja, the locative case for this is isukib, whence Suakin might have derived. The spelling on Admiralty charts in the late 19th century was "Sauakin", but in the popular press "Suakim" was predominant.

== History ==
=== Ancient ===
Suakin was likely Ptolemy's Limen Evangelis (Latin for "Port of Good Hope"), which is similarly described as lying on a circular island at the end of a long inlet. Under the Ptolemies and Romans, though, the Red Sea's major port was Berenice to the north. The growth of the Muslim caliphate shifted trade first to the Hijaz and then to the Persian Gulf.

=== Medieval ===
The collapse of the Abbasids and growth of Fatimid Egypt changed this and Al-Qusayr and Aydhab became important emporia, trading with India and ferrying African pilgrims to Mecca. Suakin was first mentioned by name in the 10th century by al-Hamdani, who says it was already an ancient town. At that time, Suakin was a small Beja settlement, but it began to expand after the abandonment of the port of Badi to its south. The Crusades and Mongol invasions drove more trade into the region: there are a number of references to Venetian merchants residing at Suakin and Massawa as early as the 14th century.

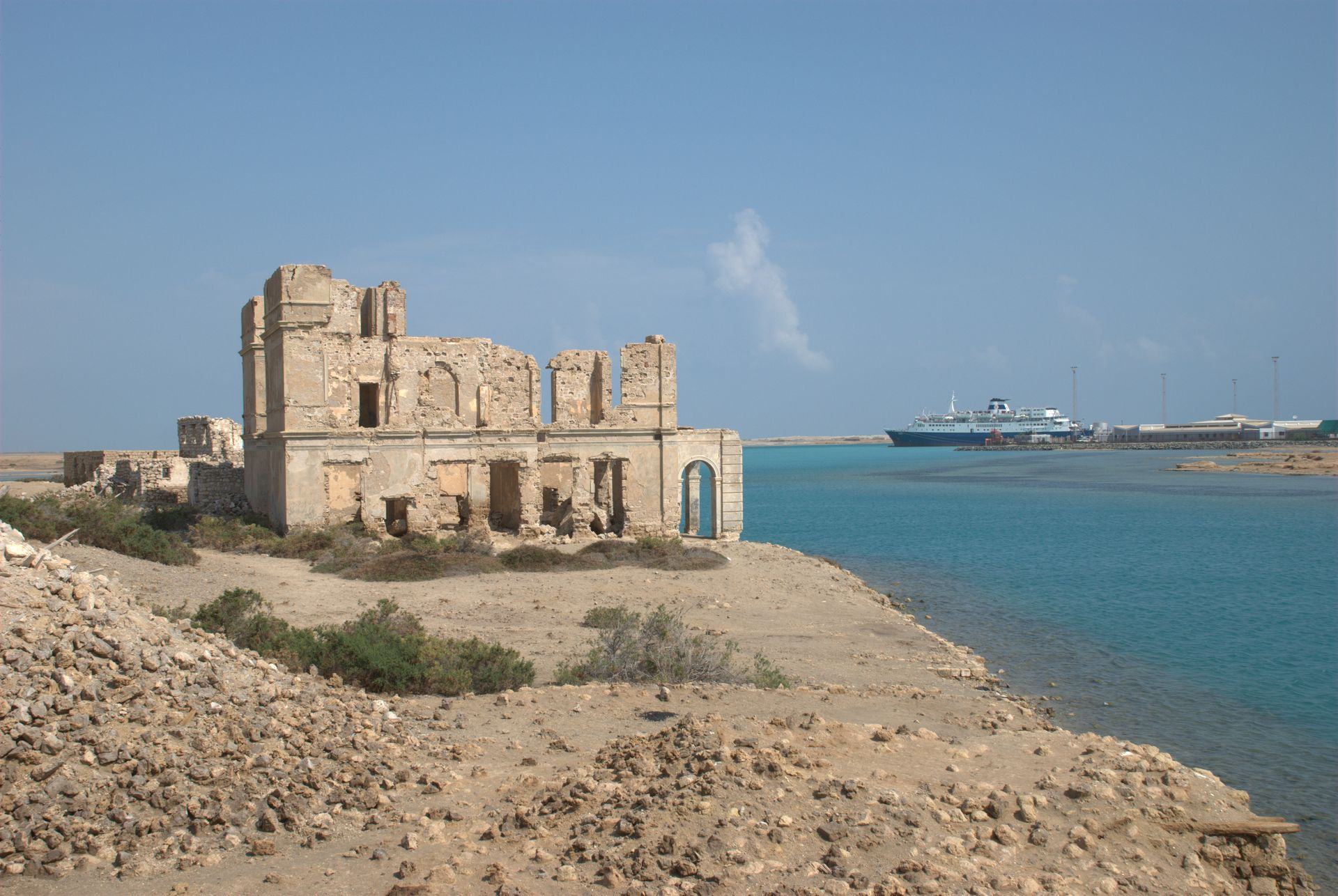
Building of Suakin in ruins

One of Suakin's rulers, Ala al-Din al-Asba'ani, angered the Mamluk sultan Baybars by seizing the goods of merchants who died at sea nearby. In 1264, the governor of Qus and his general Ikhmin Ala al-Din attacked with the support of Aydhab. Al-Asba'ani was forced to flee the city. The continuing enmity between the two towns is testified to by reports that after the destruction of Aydhab by Sultan Barsbay in 1426, the refugees, who fled to Suakin instead of Dongola, were all slaughtered.

Despite the town's formal submission to the Mamluks in 1317, O. G. S. Crawford believed that the city remained a center of Christianity into the 13th century. Muslim immigrants such as the Banu Kanz gradually transformed this: Ibn Battuta records that in 1332, there was a Muslim "sultan" of Suakin, al-Sharif Zaid ibn-Abi Numayy ibn-'Ajlan, who was the son of a Meccan sharif. Following the region's inheritance laws, he had inherited the local leadership from his Bejan maternal uncles. With the decline of Mamluk power in the late 14th century, the Hedareb tribe took over the port city and made it their capital. Suakin then established itself as the most important north east African port along the Red Sea. In the fifteenth century, Suakin was briefly part of the Adal Sultanate. Suakin was sieged by the Portuguese in 1513 and captured briefly in 1541.

=== Ottoman ===
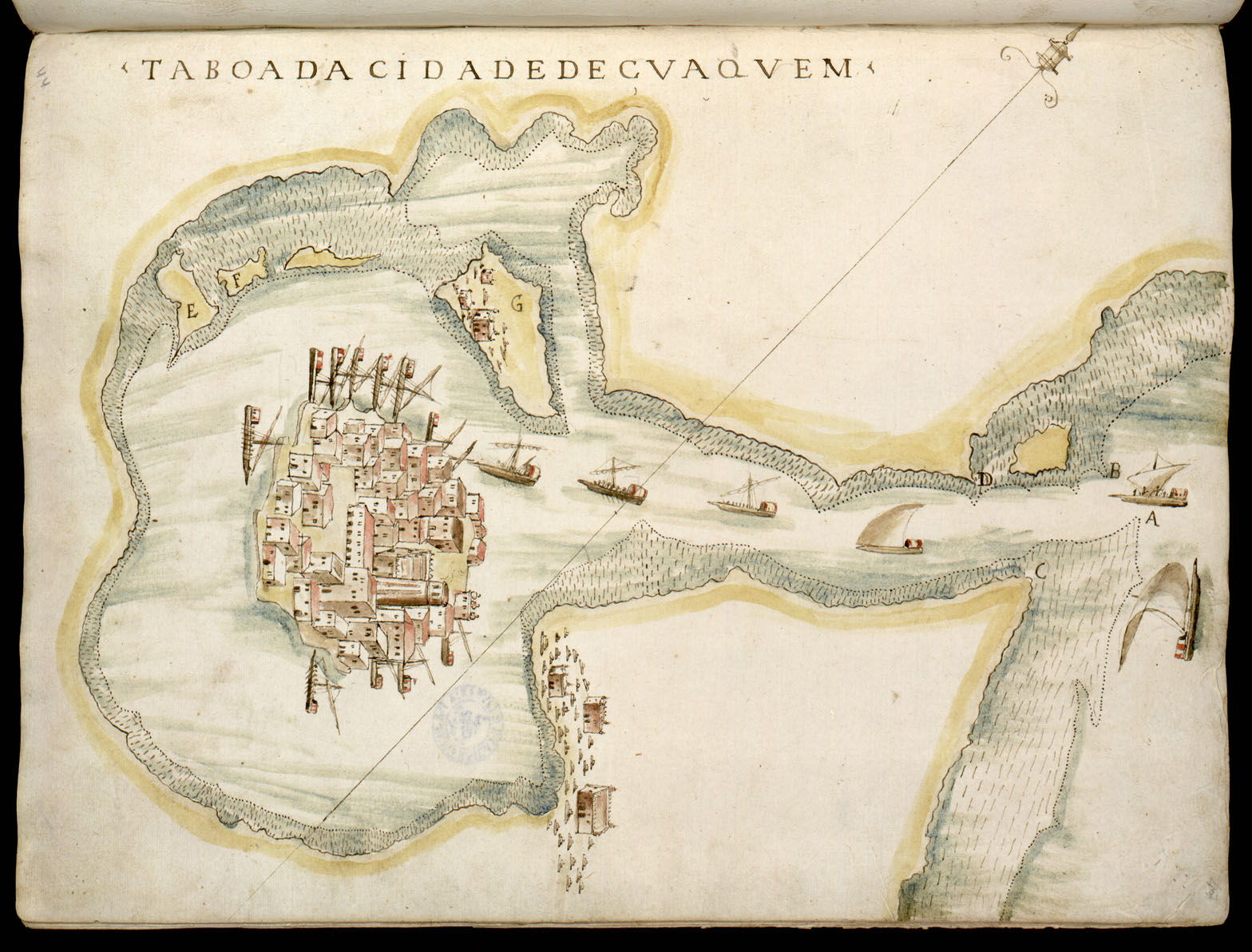
1541 map of Suakin by João de Castro

Following the Ottoman conquest of Egypt in 1517, the Ottoman Empire became the major power in the Red Sea. After a brief period of Ottoman-Portuguese struggles in the Red Sea, Özdemir Pasha occupied Suakin in the early 1550s. Though it was only loosely controlled, until the Ottoman province of Habesh was established in 1555 with the residence of its pasha in Suakin. The Ottomans restored the two main mosques - Shafi'i and Hanafi, strengthened the walls of the fort and built new roads and buildings. As the Portuguese explorers discovered and perfected the sea route around Africa and the Ottomans were unable to stop this trade, the local merchants began to abandon the town.

Some trade was kept up with the Sultanate of Sennar, but by the early 19th century, the Swiss traveler Johann Ludwig Burckhardt found two-thirds of the homes in ruins. The Khedive Isma'il received Suakin from the Ottomans in 1865 and attempted to revitalize it: Egypt built new houses, mills, mosques, hospitals, and a church for immigrant Copts.

=== British rule ===
The British Army was involved at Suakin in 1883–1885 and Lord Kitchener was there in this period leading the Egyptian Army contingent. Suakin was his headquarters and his force survived a lengthy siege there.

The Australian colonial forces of Victoria offered their torpedo boat HMVS Childers and gunboats HMVS Victoria and HMVS Albert, which arrived in Suakin on 19 March 1884 on their delivery voyage from Britain, only to be released as fighting had moved inland. They departed on 23 March, arriving in Melbourne on 25 June 1884. An essentially civilian military force of 770 men from New South Wales, including some of the Naval Brigade, arrived in Suakin in March 1885 and served until mid-May.

After the defeat of the Mahdist State, the British preferred to develop the new Port Sudan, rather than engage in the extensive rebuilding and expansion that would have been necessary to make Suakin comparable. By 1922, the last of the British had left.

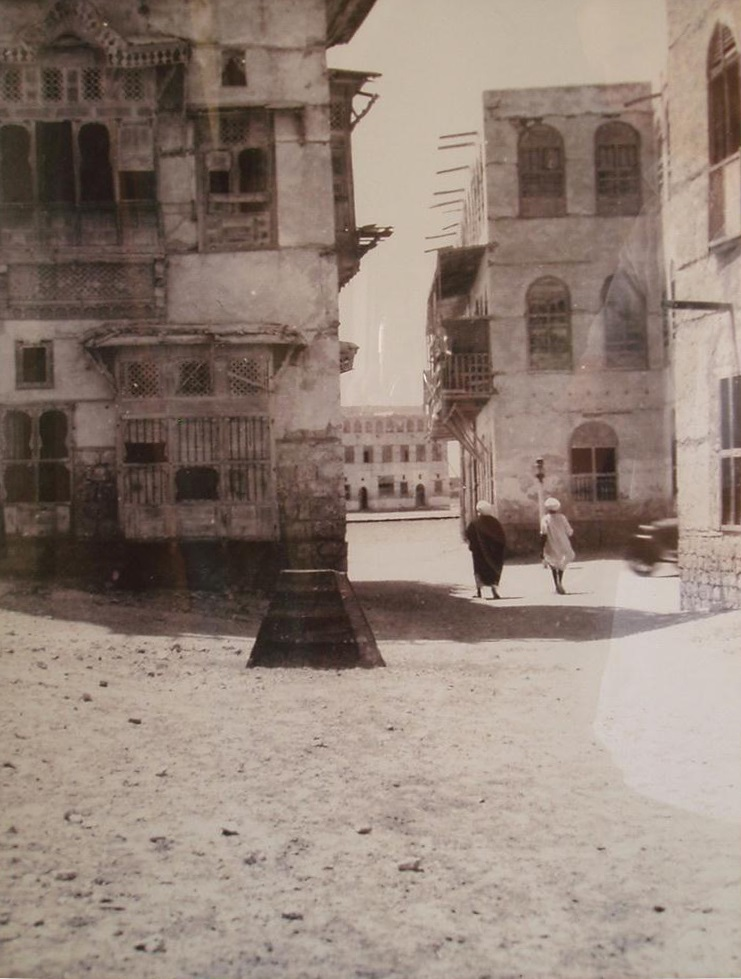
Suakin in 1928

=== 21st century ===
Since 2000, Sudan's National Corporation for Antiquities and Museums has undertaken research and documented the history of Suakin, and in 2022, the online project Sudan Memory published historical photographs, architectural drawings and a 3D reconstruction of the town on its website.

On 17 January 2018, as part of a rapprochement with Sudan, Turkey was granted a 99-year lease over Suakin island. Turkey plans to restore the ruined Ottoman port city on the island.

On 12 June 2022, some 15,000 sheep drowned in the sinking of the Badr 1 in the port of Suakin.

== Buildings of Suakin ==
The buildings of Suakin were largely constructed of madrepore, or rock-coral, taken from the sea-bed. The vernacular style of construction under the Ottomans was akin to that of Jiddah in Arabia and Mitsiwa in Ethiopia. The houses, which had a white plaster finish, were up to four storeys in height and often built in blocks or terraces of three or more, separated by narrow streets. They had large casement windows (Arab. rushān) and doors of Java teak surmounted by carved stone door-hoods and denticulated parapets. From the 1860s an Egyptian style of architecture began to incorporate features from Egypt and Europe. As the buildings had no plaster covering, they decayed quickly and the town fell into ruin.

— Suakin, Grove Art Online

A detailed description of the buildings of Suakin, including measured plans and detailed sketches, can be found in The Coral Buildings of Suakin: Islamic Architecture, Planning, Design and Domestic Arrangements in a Red Sea Port by Jean-Pierre Greenlaw, Kegan Paul International, 1995, ISBN 0-7103-0489-7.

== Climate ==
Suakin has a very hot desert climate (Köppen BWh) with brutally hot and humid, though dry, summers and very warm winters. Rainfall is minimal except from October to December, when easterly winds can give occasional downpours: in November 1965 as much as 445 millimetres (17.5 in) fell, but in the whole year from July 1981 to June 1982 no more than 3 millimetres (0.1 in) was recorded.

Climate data for Suakin (Sawakin)
Month	Jan	Feb	Mar	Apr	May	Jun	Jul	Aug	Sep	Oct	Nov	Dec	Year
Mean daily maximum °C (°F)	26 (79)	26 (79)	27 (81)	30 (86)	33 (91)	38 (100)	42 (108)	41 (106)	37 (99)	33 (91)	30 (86)	27 (81)	32 (90)
Mean daily minimum °C (°F)	19 (66)	19 (66)	20 (68)	21 (70)	24 (75)	25 (77)	28 (82)	29 (84)	26 (79)	25 (77)	23 (73)	21 (70)	23 (73)
Average rainfall mm (inches)	8 (0.3)	2 (0.1)	1 (0.0)	1 (0.0)	1 (0.0)	0 (0)	8 (0.3)	6 (0.2)	0 (0)	16 (0.6)	54 (2.1)	28 (1.1)	125 (4.7)
Source: Weatherbase

== See also ==
- Port Sudan
