= HMVS Victoria =

HMVS Victoria is the name of two ships serving in the Victorian Naval Forces, the colonial navy of the colony of Victoria, Australia, which is also the ships' namesake:

- HMVS Victoria (1855), a sloop-of-war launched in 1855
- HMVS Victoria (1884), a gunboat launched in 1884

== See also ==
- HMS Victoria, four ships of the Royal Navy
