= HMVS Childers =

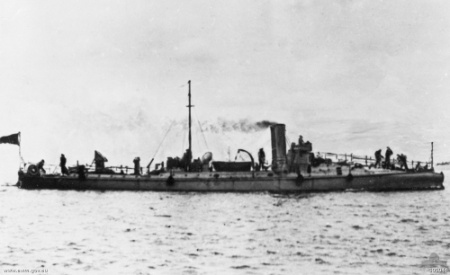
- HMVS Childers

History

Victoria and Australia
- Name: HMVS Childers
- Namesake: Hugh Childers
- Builder: Thornycroft of Chiswick
- Cost: £10,500
- Yard number: 172
- Laid down: 1883
- Launched: 18 August 1883
- Completed: 1884
- Decommissioned: 1924
- Fate: Hulked in 1918

General characteristics
- Displacement: 63 tons
- Length: 113 ft 0 in (34.44 m)
- Beam: 12 ft 6 in (3.81 m)
- Draught: 5 ft 6 in (1.68 m)
- Propulsion: Compound expansion steam engine
- Speed: 19–20 knots (35–37 km/h)
- Complement: 12
- Armament: 2 × 1 pdr guns; 2 × 15-inch torpedo tubes; 4 sets of dropping gear

HMVS Childers was a torpedo boat of the Victorian Naval Forces, Commonwealth Naval Forces and the Royal Australian Navy.

== Design and construction ==
Childers, a first-class torpedo boat, was constructed for the colony of Victoria by John I. Thornycroft & Company on the River Thames at Chiswick, England, as Yard No. 172. Her length was 113 ft 0 in (34.44 m) overall and 111 ft 8 in (34.04 m) waterline, with beam 12 ft 6 in (3.81 m) and 5 ft 6 in (1.68 m) draught; her displacement was 60.5 tons. Childers was powered by a two-cylinder compound steam engine of 679 bhp (506 kW) giving a service speed of 19–20 knots (35–37 km/h; 22–23 mph). She had a complement of 18 and was armed with two fixed bow tubes for 15-inch Whitehead torpedoes and two 1-pounder Hotchkiss machine guns.

The vessel was ordered in August 1882, laid down in 1883, and launched on 18 August that year by the wife of the Chancellor of the Exchequer and former First Sea Lord, Hugh Childers, after whom the vessel was named; he had spent the first seven years of his working life in the Victoria colonial administration in the 1850s. Childers was budgeted at £10,500, with a builder's cost outturn of £11,027. For the delivery voyage to Melbourne the boat was fitted with three masts and 1,000 square feet of canvas to supplement her limited coal capacity, and her trials were made on 16 November.

== Operational history ==
HMVS Childers sailed from Portsmouth on 3 February 1884. Shortly before reaching the Mediterranean, she ran short of coal, and was towed into the Gibraltar Straits by the British steamer Pathan. On 13 February, while Childers was en route to her scheduled rendezvous in Malta with the new gunboats HMVS Victoria and HMVS Albert, the Government of Victoria offered the assistanc of the three vessels in support of the British Sudan Campaign. The British government noted however that, while appreciating the loyal offer, it did not see an appropriate service for them. Nevertheless, Childers pressed on ahead, and on 19 March reached Suakin, Sudan, as did the two gunboats, meeting for the first time, and confirming that assistance was not required locally. Thereafter the flotilla steamed more generally in concert, though the tow from Aden to Batavia, Dutch East Indies via Colombo by Victoria was uncomfortable, and they reached Thursday Island on 18 May. Continuing via east coast ports, on 13 June they arrived at Port Jackson, Sydney, where they were painted white afresh and spruced up before being received in their home waters off Williamstown on 25 June

Childers joined the Commonwealth Naval Forces following federation in 1901, and the Royal Australian Navy when it was formed in 1911. During World War I she served in Victorian waters and as a tender to HMAS Cerberus.

== Decommissioning and fate ==
Childers was sold to J.J. Savage & Co. of South Yarra on 5 April 1918 for £20. Childers was eventually hulked on Swan Island in Port Phillip.

== See also ==
- List of Victorian Naval Forces ships
- Colonial navies of Australia - Victoria
- List of Royal Australian Navy ships

== Bibliography ==
- Gillett, Ross (1977). Warships of Australia. MacDougall, Anthony; Graham, Colin (illustrations). Adelaide, SA: Rigby. ISBN 0-7270-0472-7. OCLC 4466019.
- Frame, Tom (2004). No Pleasure Cruise: the story of the Royal Australian Navy (Google Books). Crows Nest, NSW: Allen & Unwin. ISBN 1-74114-233-4. OCLC 55980812.
