= HMVS Victoria (1884) =

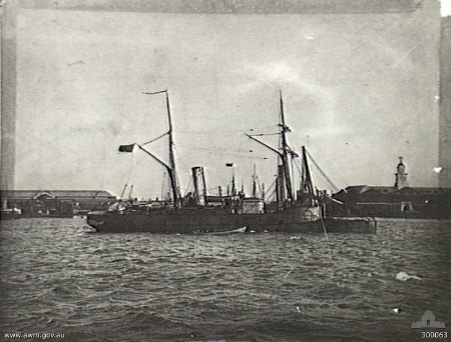
- Victoria at Portsmouth in 1884 before sailing to Australia

History

Victoria
- Name: Victoria II
- Builder: Armstrong Mitchell and Co.
- Launched: 1884
- Decommissioned: 1893
- In service: 1884
- Homeport: Melbourne, Victoria
- Fate: Scrapped 1920

General characteristics
- Class & type: Armstrong type D flat-iron gunboat
- Displacement: 530 tons
- Length: 145 ft (44 m)
- Beam: 27 ft (8.2 m)
- Propulsion: Expansion steam engines
- Speed: 12 knots
- Armament: Originally 1 x BL 10-inch (254.0 mm) gun; Replaced by 1 x BL 8-inch (203.2 mm) Mk VII gun; 1 × BL 6-inch (152.4 mm) Mk I 80-pounder gun; 2 × 12 Pdr; 1-inch Nordenfelt guns

HMVS Victoria was a gunboat that served with the Victorian Naval Forces and Western Australia before being sold into private use.

== Design ==
This class was built to a type D flat-iron gunboat design from builders Armstrong Mitchell and Co.

== Operational history ==
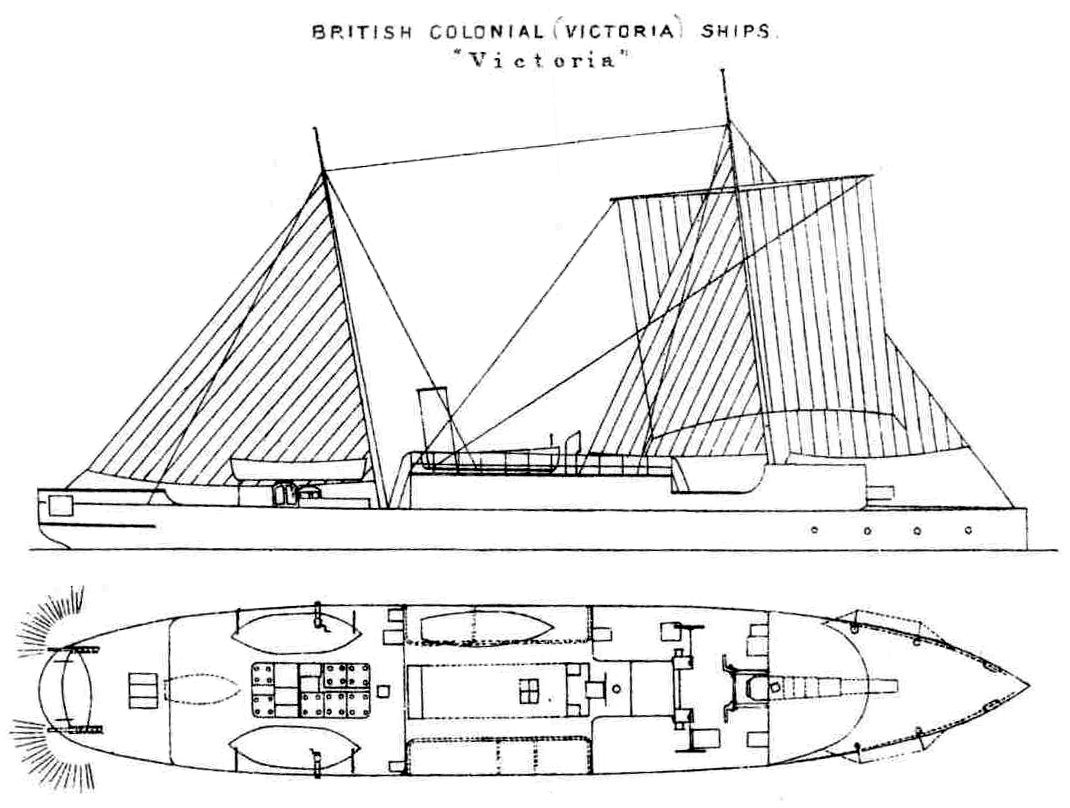
As depicted in Brassey's naval annual 1888-1889

In late February 1884, Victoria was in Malta on her delivery voyage to Australia with the gunboat Albert and the torpedo boat Childers when news of General Charles Gordon's death at Khartoum reached the British Empire. The three ships were immediately offered for service in the Sudan Campaign. The offer was accepted and the smaller less seaworthy Childers was sent ahead. By the time the two larger gunboats reached their destination on 19 March at Suakin, the conflict had moved too far inland for warships to be of any assistance. The vessels all departed three days later to continue their voyage to the colony. They arrived in Melbourne on 26 June after travelling via Aden, Colombo, the Dutch East Indies and Torres Strait.

Due to the depression of the 1890s Victoria was decommissioned in 1893 and sold. She was subsequently purchased by the West Australian government in 1896. She was purchased in 1902 by the Sydney based tug company Fenwicks, who used her as a towing vessel. She was scrapped in 1920 after 18 years of service on Sydney Harbour.

== See also ==
- List of Victorian Naval Forces ships
- Colonial navies of Australia - Victoria

== Bibliography ==
- Warships of Australia, Ross Gillett, Illustrations Colin Graham, Rigby Limited, 1977, ISBN 0-7270-0472-7
- Frame, Tom (2004). No Pleasure Cruise: the story of the Royal Australian Navy (Google Books). Crows Nest, NSW: Allen & Unwin. ISBN 1-74114-233-4. OCLC 55980812.
