= HMS Wolverine (1863) =

19th century British ship

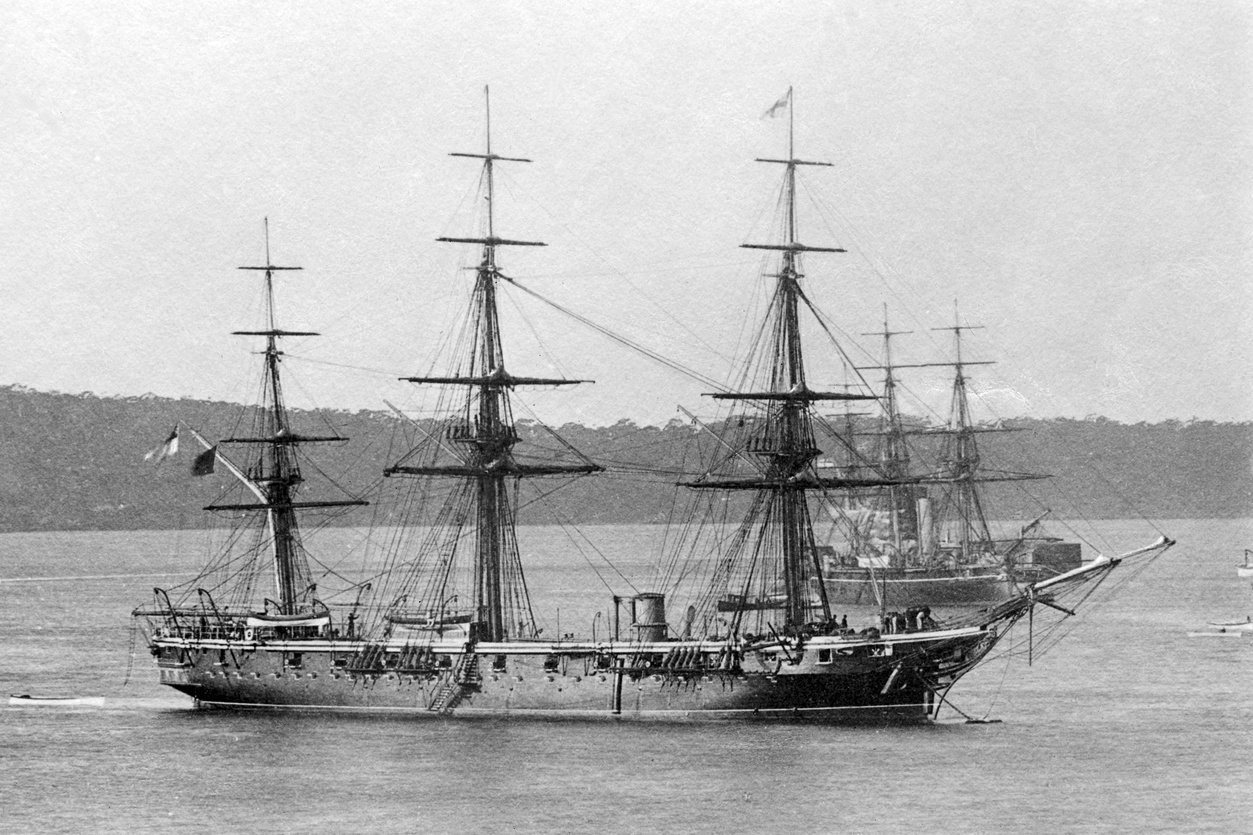
- HMS Wolverine, Sydney, July 1881.

History
- Name: HMS Wolverine (also HMS Wolverene)
- Builder: Woolwich Dockyard
- Laid down: 14 April 1859
- Launched: 29 August 1863
- Fate: Given to Colony of New South Wales.
- Name: Wolverine
- Owner: Colony of New South Wales
- Home port: Sydney
- Fate: Sold to Peter Ellison, Sydney for £2200.
- Name: Wolverine
- Fate: Scrapped and hulk burnt.

General characteristics
- Type: Jason-class corvette
- Displacement: 2,416 tons (as completed)
- Tons burthen: 1,703 bm
- Length: 225 ft 0 in (68.6 m) (gundeck); 196 ft 8 1/2 in (60.0 m) (keel)
- Beam: 40 ft 8 in (12.4 m) (overall)
- Draught: 17 ft 11 in (5.5 m) (forward); 20 ft 4 in (6.2 m) (aft)
- Depth of hold: 24 ft 2 in (7.4 m)
- Installed power: 400 nominal horsepower; 1,628 indicated horsepower (1,214 kW) (Note: Wolverine's engine was never satisfactory and was replaced in 1876 by Ravenhill with another 400 nominal horsepower unit, but with an indicated horsepower of 1,493.)
- Propulsion: 2-cylinder horizontal single-expansion engine; 4 × boilers; 4 × furnaces; Single screw
- Sail plan: Full-rigged ship
- Speed: 11.3 knots (20.9 km/h)
- Complement: c.250
- Armament: 20 × 8-inch (68 pdr/65 cwt) muzzle-loading smoothbore broadside guns; 1 × pivot-mounted 7-inch (110 pdr/82 cwt) Armstrong breech loader

HMS Wolverine (also HMS Wolverene) was a Jason-class three-masted wooden screw corvette, of the Royal Navy. Later she became flagship of the Australia Station, eventually being presented to the Colony of New South Wales as a training ship for the New South Wales Naval Brigade and New South Wales Naval Artillery Volunteers.

== History ==
HMS Wolverine was built at the Woolwich Dockyard and launched at Woolwich on 29 August 1863. She served in the North America and West Indies Station in the 1860s and early 1870s. In June and July 1872, Wolverine assisted in the refloating the Sultan of Zanzibar's warship El Majidi, which had been blown ashore at Zanzibar in a cyclone. She was commissioned as the flagship of the Australia Station on 7 September 1875, under the command of Commodore Anthony Hoskins. In 1880, Francis Pringle Taylor was appointed lieutenant in command, a position he held until 1884. In late May 1880, Wolverine ran aground in the River Tamar. She was refloated.

During her service Wolverine was present for the Royal Navy's Detached Squadron world cruise in 1881 when the princes Albert and George undertook naval training. The Wolverine left Sydney Harbour at the same time as the Detached Squadron on 10 August 1881, with Commodore John Wilson, Commander-in-Chief of the Australia Station, her destination being Brisbane and then New Guinea. The scientist Nicholas Miklouho-Maclay travelled to New Guinea on this voyage where, aided by the Rev. James Chalmers, he intervened with the Commodore to stop the destruction of the entire native village of Kalo in reprisal for the recent murder of some missionaries there.

Wolverine's service came to an end and was replaced by HMS Nelson and paid off in 1882 at Sydney. She was presented to the Colony of New South Wales as a training ship for the New South Wales Naval Brigade and New South Wales Naval Artillery Volunteers – challenging "enemy" ships at Sydney heads and "attacking" coastal and harbour fortifications.

The ship was decommissioned in 1892, sold to a private firm (Peter Ellison, Sydney) for £2,200 in August 1893 and with the engines removed was used as a hulk.

After refit and conversion to a barque, she commenced service as a merchant vessel. On a voyage from Sydney to Liverpool, England she sprung leaks and returned to Auckland for repairs, however upon docking she was found to be unfit. She was sold to G. Niccol, Auckland, for £1,000.

== Fate ==
She was partly scrapped and her hull was burnt.

== Gallery ==
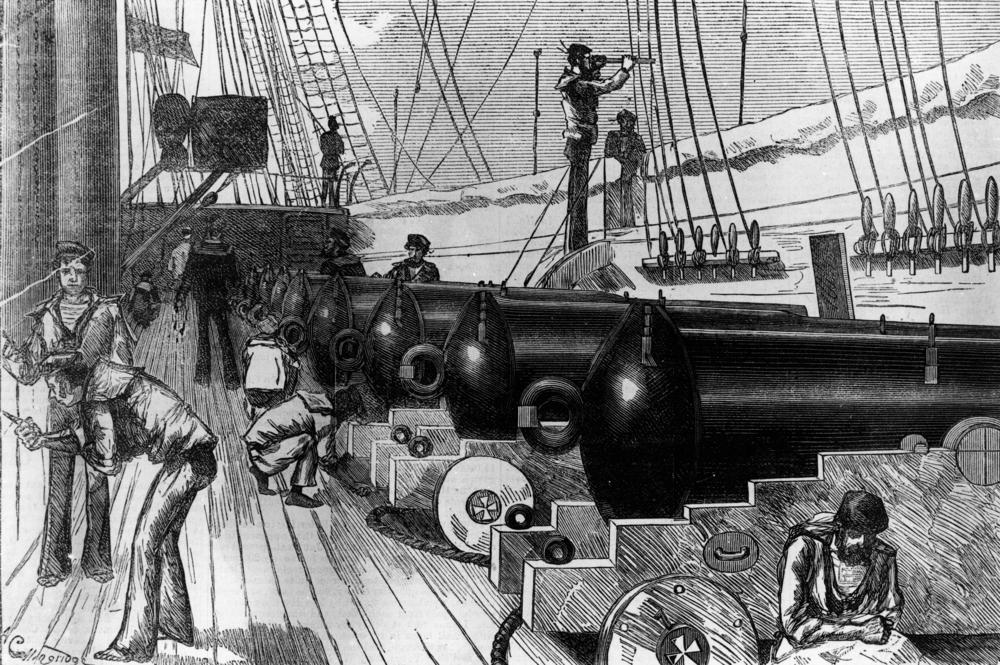
Gun deck of HMS Wolverine, 1881

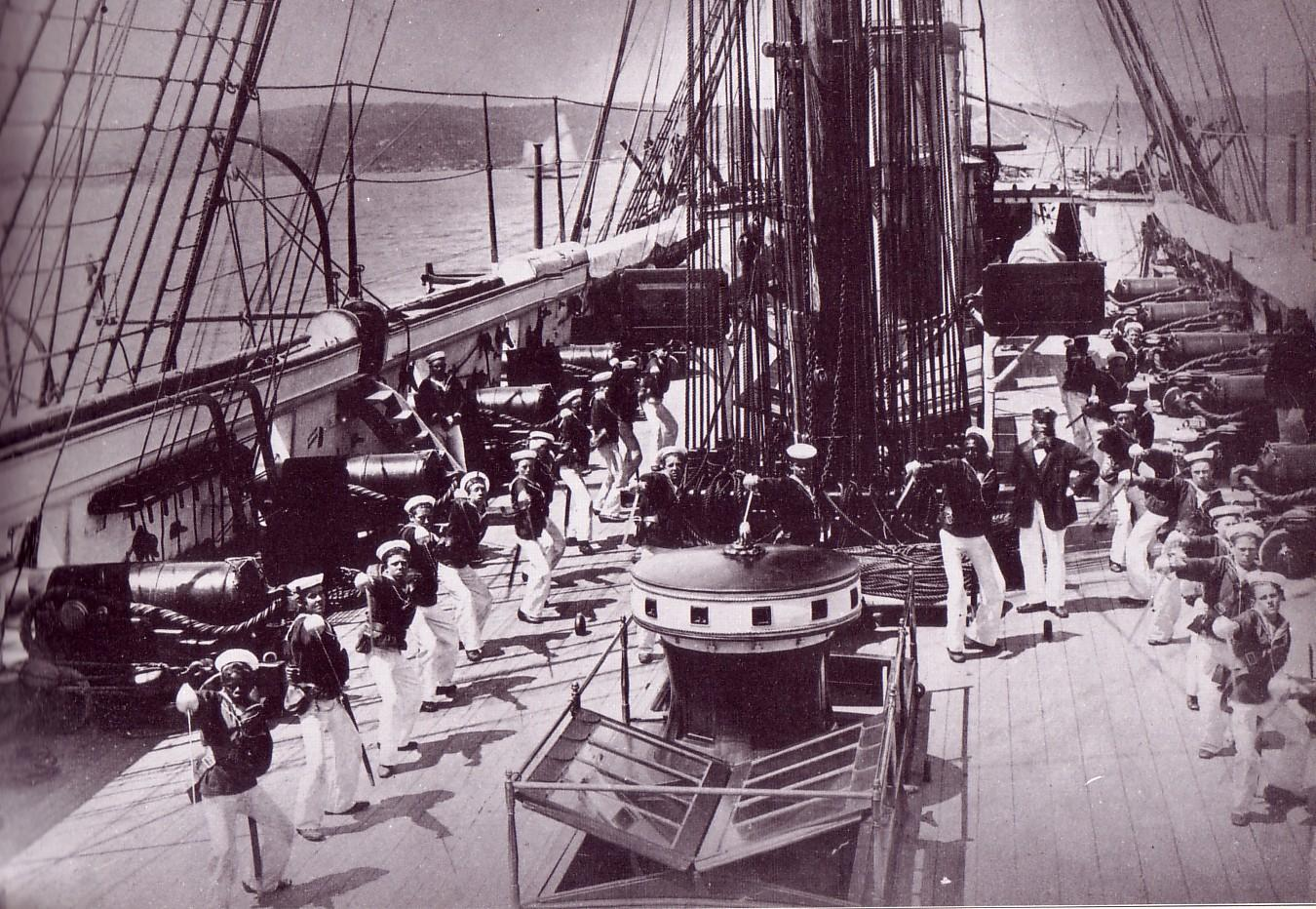
A cutlass drill on HMS Wolverine, 1882

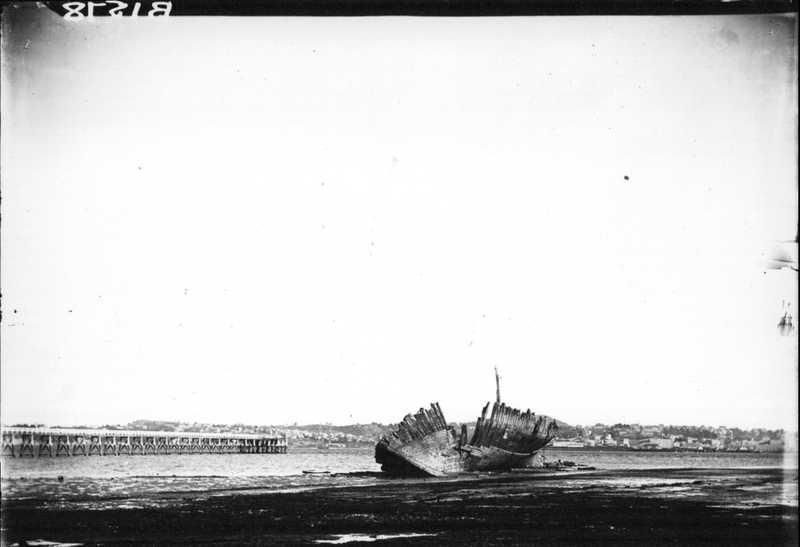
The wreck of HMS Wolverine at Stanley Bay, Auckland, New Zealand, photographed in 1902
