= HMVS Countess of Hopetoun =

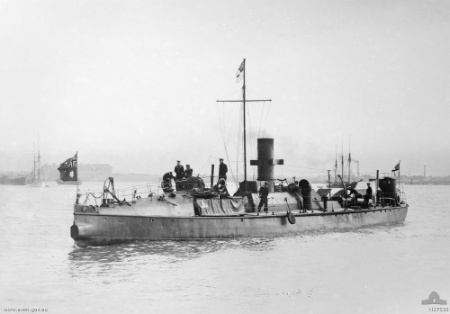
- HMAS Countess of Hopetoun in 1914

History

Victoria and Australia
- Name: HMVS Countess of Hopetoun
- Namesake: The Countess of Hopetoun, wife of the then Governor of Victoria
- Builder: Yarrow & Co.
- Laid down: 1890
- Completed: 1891
- Decommissioned: 1924
- Fate: Scrapped in 1925

General characteristics
- Displacement: 75 tons
- Length: 130 ft (40 m)
- Beam: 13.5 ft (4.1 m)
- Draught: 7.333 ft (2.235 m)
- Propulsion: Expansion steam engines
- Speed: 24 knots (44 km/h; 28 mph) (later 20–21 knots (37–39 km/h; 23–24 mph))
- Complement: 19
- Armament: 2 × 1-inch (later 3 × 3-pounder) guns; 3 × 14-inch torpedo tubes (1 bow, 1 rotating twin mount amidships); 4 sets of torpedo dropping gear

HMVS Countess of Hopetoun was a 1st Class Torpedo Boat of the Victorian Naval Forces, Commonwealth Naval Forces and the Royal Australian Navy. She was named after Hersey, Countess of Hopetoun and later Marchioness of Linlithgow, the wife of the 7th Earl of Hopetoun, the then Governor of Victoria and later the first Governor-General of Australia.

== Operational history ==
Built by Yarrow and Co. on the River Thames, Countess of Hopetoun was the last vessel constructed for the Victorian Naval Forces. She arrived at Williamstown, Victoria via the Cape of Good Hope after 154 days under way.

The vessel joined the Commonwealth Naval Forces following federation in 1901, then the Royal Australian Navy when it was formed in 1911. During World War I she served in Victorian waters and as a tender to HMAS Cerberus. She attended the arrival of His Royal Highness Edward, The Prince of Wales in Port Phillip on 28 May 1920. The prince arrived aboard the battlecruiser Renown and was received by no less than 31 warships.

== Fate ==
Countess of Hopetoun was sold to Edward Hill of North Melbourne in April 1924 and scrapped the following year. Her hull was later sunk near Swan Island in Port Phillip.

== See also ==
- List of Victorian Naval Forces ships
- Colonial navies of Australia – Victoria
- List of Royal Australian Navy ships

== Bibliography ==
- Warships of Australia, Ross Gillett, Illustrations Colin Graham, Rigby Limited, 1977, ISBN 0-7270-0472-7
- All the World's Fighting Ships 1860-1905, edited by Robert Gardiner, Roger Chesneau and Eugene M. Kolesnik, Conway Maritime Press, 1979. ISBN 0-85177-133-5
