= BL 6-inch 80-pounder gun =

Ordnance BL 6-inch 80-pounder Mk I
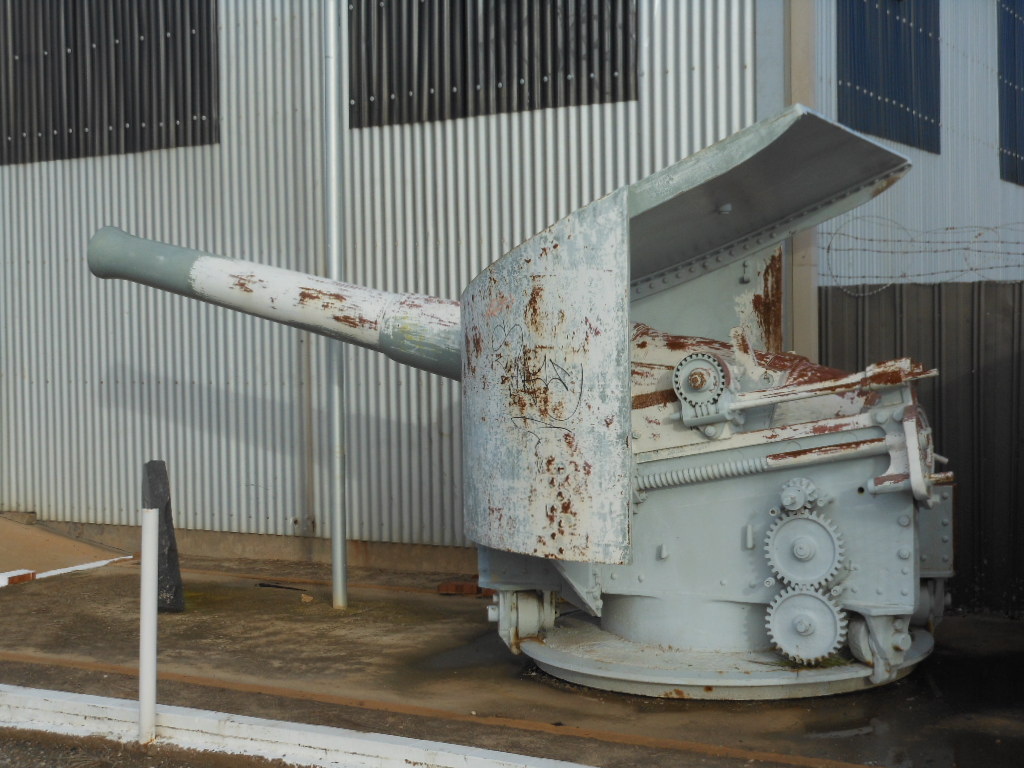
- Gun from HMAS Protector at Birkenhead, South Australia, August 2011
- Type: Naval gun Coast defence gun
- Place of origin: United Kingdom

Service history
- In service: 1880–1943
- Used by: Royal Navy; Australian Colonies

Production history
- Designer: Elswick Ordnance Company
- Manufacturer: Elswick Ordnance Company
- Variants: Mk I

Specifications
- Mass: 80 or 81 cwt (4 tons)
- Barrel length: 153 – 156 inches
- Shell: 80 pounds (36.29 kg) Palliser, Shrapnel, common
- Calibre: 6-inch (152.4 mm)
- Breech: 3 motion interrupted screw. Elswick cup obturation
- Muzzle velocity: 1,880 feet per second (573 m/s)
- Maximum firing range: 8,000 yards (7,300 m)

The BL 6-inch 80-pounder gun Mk I was the first generation of British 6-inch breechloading naval gun after it switched from muzzle-loaders in 1880. They were originally designed to use the old gunpowder propellants.

== Mk I 80-pounder ==
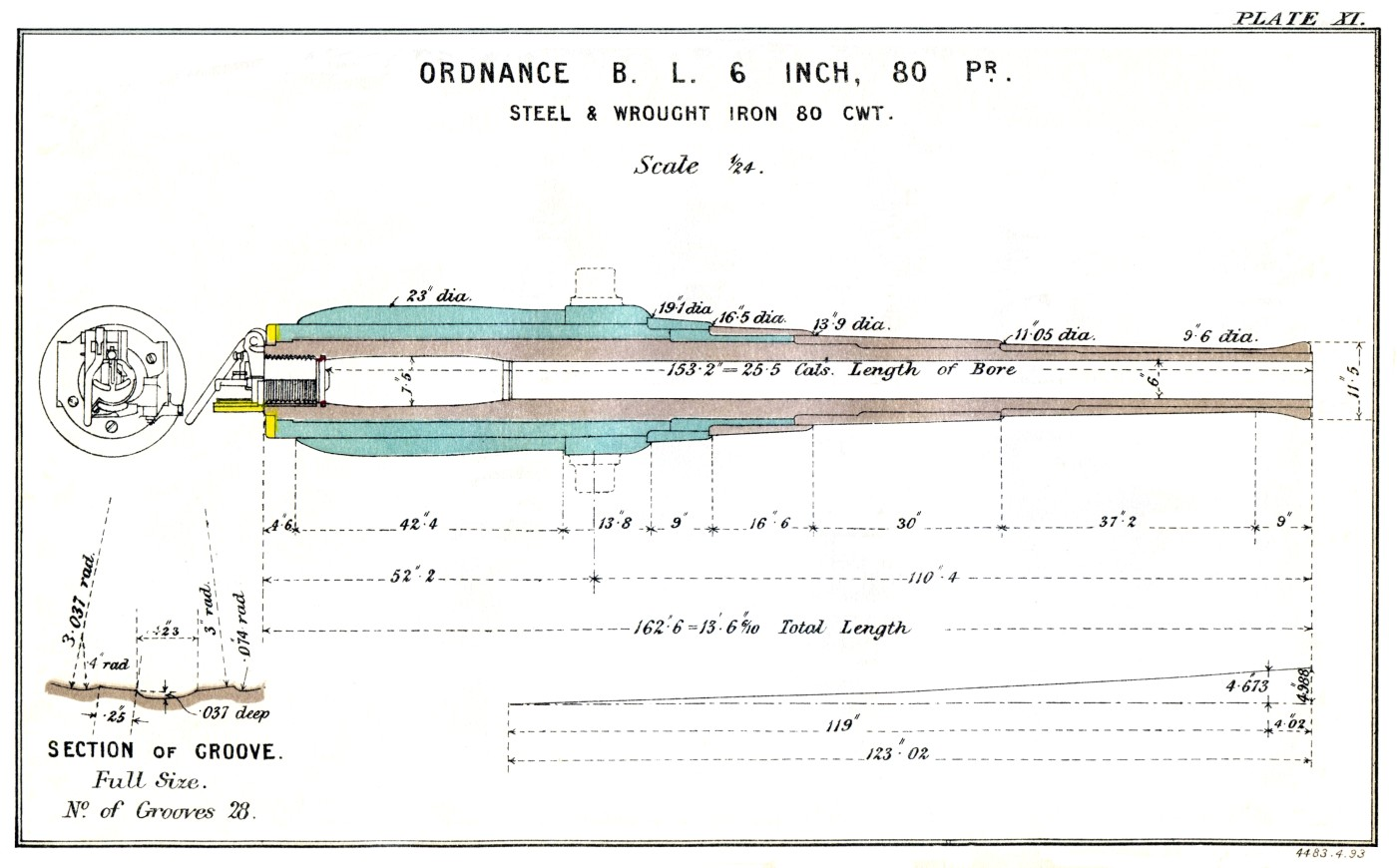
6-inch 80-pounder 80 cwt gun

Mk I of 80 cwt (4 tons) as originally built was an Elswick Ordnance design which was weakly made and fired only an 80-pound (36 kg) projectile. It consisted of a steel barrel with wrought-iron coils shrunk over it. A few guns were issued to the Royal Navy but most were replaced by the later versions. Mk I guns remaining in British service were rebuilt with "chase hoops" added around the barrel for strengthening, and the barrel was shortened by 3 inches to keep its centre of gravity at the trunnions. This resulted in the 81 cwt Mk I gun.

The breech was rotated to the left to lock it, unlike standard British service BL guns made by the Royal Gun Factory which all rotated to the right to lock.

These guns are commonly referred to as "6-in. 81-cwt B.L.R." in contemporaneous publications such as Brassey's Naval Annual. The official designation in British ordnance manuals was "80-pounder BL" to differentiate it and its ammunition from the later marks of 6-inch BL guns which fired 100-pound projectiles.

== 80-pounder in Australian colonial service ==
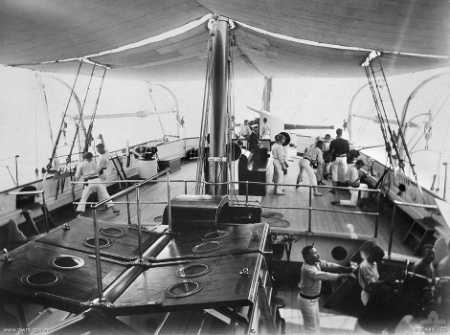
Quarterdeck of Protector with aft 6-inch gun trained to port, circa. 1903

Australian colonies and New Zealand purchased various 6-inch guns direct from the manufacturers, usually Elswick Ordnance Company, and these versions do not correspond directly with the official "Marks" as adopted by the British government. Specifications of guns purchased by Australian colonies are similar to those of the original British Mk I 80 cwt gun, firing an 80-pound projectile.

The gun equipped some gunboats of the Australian colonial navies :

- HMQS Paluma
- HMQS Gayundah
- HMCS Protector
- HMVS Victoria of 1884
- HMVS Albert of 1884

Also on armed harbour vessels in Victoria :

- Gannet : tug
- Batman : hopper barge / dredge
- Fawkner : hopper barge / dredge

== Ammunition ==
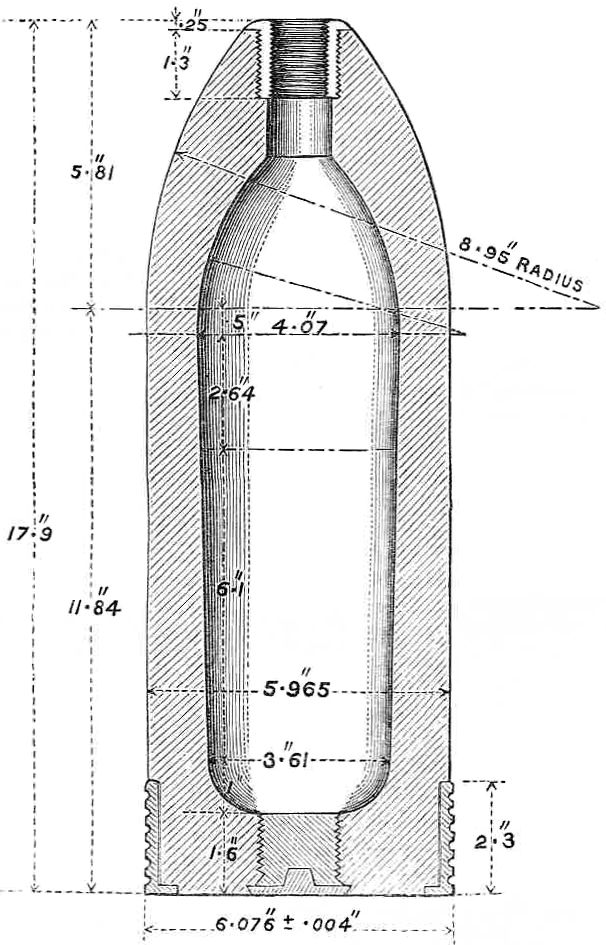
Common shell diagram

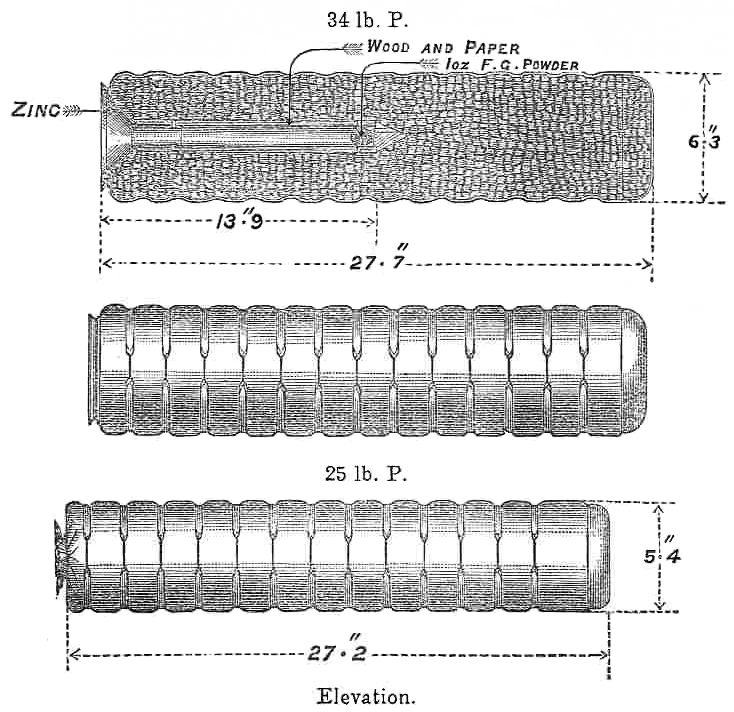
Full charge (top) and reduced charge (bottom) powder cartridges

== See also ==
- List of naval guns

== Surviving examples ==
- A 4-ton 80-pounder gun at Fort Glanville, Adelaide, South Australia
- A 4-ton 80-pounder gun in Bundaberg Botanic Gardens, Bundaberg, Queensland Australia
- A restored gun from HMAS Protector is outside the Naval Reserve Cadets building in Jenkins Street, Birkenhead, Adelaide
- The aft gun from HMQS Paluma is in the Treloar Centre at the Australian War Memorial, in Canberra

== Bibliography ==
- Campbell, N.J.M. (1983). "British Naval Guns 1880–1945, No. 10". In John Roberts (ed.). Warship. Vol. VII. Annapolis, Maryland: Naval Institute Press. pp. 170–72. ISBN 0-87021-982-0.
- Text Book of Gunnery, 1887. LONDON : PRINTED FOR HIS MAJESTY'S STATIONERY OFFICE, BY HARRISON AND SONS, ST. MARTIN'S LANE
- Treatise on Service Ordnance. HMSO, 1893.
- Text Book of Gunnery, 1902. LONDON : PRINTED FOR HIS MAJESTY'S STATIONERY OFFICE, BY HARRISON AND SONS, ST. MARTIN'S LANE
- Manual for Victorian naval forces 1887. HMVS Cerberus website
- Additions to 1890 Manual for Victorian naval forces circa. 1895. HMVS Cerberus website
- I.V.Hogg & L.F. Thurston, British Artillery Weapons & Ammunition 1914–1918. London: Ian Allan, 1972.
