= Colonial navies of Australia =

Naval forces of Australia during the colonial period

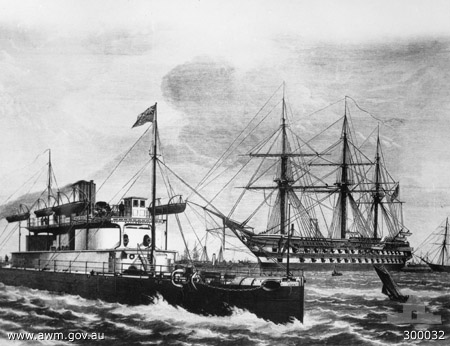
An artist's impression of the ironclad HMVS Cerberus (left) and the training ship HMVS Nelson (right). The Victorian naval force was considered the most powerful of all the colonial naval forces.

Before Federation in 1901 five of the six separate colonies maintained their own naval forces for defence. The colonial navies were supported by the ships of the Royal Navy's Australian Station which was established in 1859. The separate colonies maintained control over their respective navies until 1 March 1901, when the Commonwealth Naval Forces was created.

== New South Wales ==
New South Wales Naval Brigade

At the time of the Boxer Rebellion, naval brigades from New South Wales, Victoria, and South Australia, were part of the British contingent in the field force under General Alfred Gaselee, in the Gaselee Expedition, a successful relief by a multinational military force that in 1900 marched to Beijing to protect the diplomatic legations and foreign nationals in the city from attacks. The New South Wales Naval Brigade included 25 men from the New South Wales Marine Corps. (This unit was completely unrelated, except for its name, to the New South Wales Marine Corps, which accompanied the First Fleet and served between 1788 and 1791.)

New South Wales Naval Artillery Volunteers

During the early nineteenth century the Government of New South Wales began construction of naval fortifications in Sydney Harbour. However, security was generally lax. In November 1839 the USS Vincennes was able to slip into Sydney Harbour un-noticed under the cover of darkness, much to the surprise of Sydney-siders the following morning. As Sydney was the major base for the Royal Navy in Australia, the New South Wales Government had no incentive to create their own naval force. This sense of security ended with the outbreak of the Crimean War and in 1854 the government asked for tenders for the construction of a gunboat to assist in the defence of Sydney. The vessel was named HMCS Spitfire and was the first naval vessel completed by an Australian colonial government. Although modified from an existing boat, Spitfire was nevertheless the first warship to be constructed in Australia. Spitfire remained in service with the New South Wales colonial navy until 1859 when she was given to Queensland.

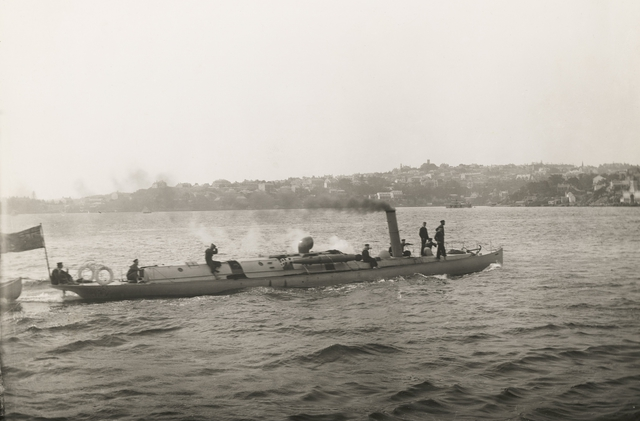
The torpedo boat Avernus in Sydney Harbour

After the construction of Spitfire (launched 4 April 1855) the New South Wales Government took no further steps in developing a naval force until a naval brigade of 120 men was formed in 1863. There was strong support for the naval brigade and in 1864 it consisted of five companies, four in Sydney and one in Newcastle, with an overall strength of 200 men. The naval brigade headquarters was established at Fort Macquarie, where the Sydney Opera House today stands. Since Spitfire was sold to Queensland in 1859, the naval brigade had no ships of their own. This problem was not rectified until the late 1870s, when the government ordered the construction of two second class torpedo boats, Avernus and Acheron; these vessels were constructed in Sydney.

In 1882, Wolverine was acquired from the Royal Navy. That year the New South Wales Naval Artillery Volunteers were formed as a citizen's auxiliary which would operated the guns on board any warship of the colony when required. HMS Wolverine was paid off in 1893 and the total number of vessels used by the Navy decreased over time as any perceived threat diminished. Meanwhile, the naval brigade continued to grow, however, and reached a total strength of 614 men at Federation.

== Queensland ==
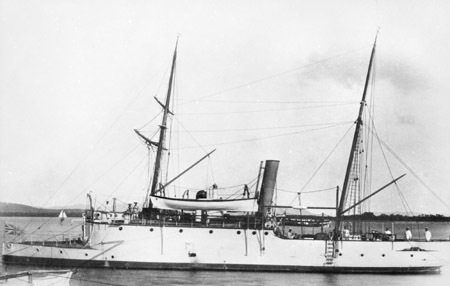
HMQS Paluma in 1889

Queensland Maritime Defence Force

One of the many outcomes of the Jervois-Scratchley reports was the formation of the Queensland Maritime Defence Force in 1883. Its purpose was to assist in the defence of Queensland's extensive coastline. To equip the new force the colonial government purchased two gunboats and a torpedo boat whilst port facilities and headquarters were established at Kangaroo Point, Brisbane. The gunboats Paluma and Gayundah were ordered from the shipyards of Armstrong, Mitchell and Company and featured a shallow draft capable of operating in the many bays and estuaries along the coast. Gayundah served as a training ship and conducted the first ship to shore radio transmissions in Australia whilst Paluma was loaned to the Royal Navy to carry out survey work on the Great Barrier Reef and along the Australian east coast. The torpedo boat Mosquito was ordered from Thornycroft of Chiswick. Mosquito was never commissioned, but was placed into service when required.

From this beginning further vessels were acquired to give Queensland the second largest fleet in the colonies behind Victoria. Five government hopper barges were modified to act as Auxiliary Gunboats. These ships were built by Walkers Limited in Maryborough and at 450 tons they appear to have been the largest warships built in the Australian colonies before federation. The ships had already been ordered for the Queensland Department of Harbours and Rivers when the decision was taken to convert them to also serve a military purpose. This resulted in the fitting of a 5-inch gun and the relocation of the boilers below the waterline. The torpedo launch Midge, mining tender Miner and patrol vessel Otter made up the rest of the Queensland vessels. The Queensland Government also established naval brigades in the major ports along the Queensland coast.

The depression of the 1890s ruled out any further thoughts of expansion and greatly curtailed operations. Most of the vessels were placed in reserve only to be reactivated for annual training at Easter. Despite this, most went on to have long careers in both naval and private hands past World War II. The wrecks of many can still be seen around Moreton Bay today.

The Queensland Maritime Defence Force was not without controversy and difficulties. In October 1888, after a disagreement with the Queensland Government over conditions of service, Captain Henry Townley Wright, RN, commanding officer of Gayundah, was ordered to hand over to his second-in-command, Francis Pringle Taylor. Wright's response was to place his subordinate under arrest. He then coaled and provisioned the ship and threatened to sail her to Sydney. The Queensland Government ordered a police squad to relieve Captain Wright of his command. During the incident Captain Wright enquired from his gunner as to the best line of fire for his guns to hit Queensland Parliament House. The situation was eventually resolved. Of interest is the fact that, as Captain Wright had insisted, although Gayundah was the property of the Queensland government, it had, by Admiralty Warrant been accepted into Royal Navy service and thus as her captain he was only answerable to Rear-Admiral Fairfax the commander-in-chief of the Australian Station.

The 1893 Brisbane flood ripped Paluma from her moorings and left her well above the high-water mark in the nearby Brisbane Botanic Gardens. As locals considered how to return one of the colony's most powerful and most expensive assets to the Brisbane River another major flood just two weeks later refloated the gunboat and she was pulled clear.

Whilst these incidents may have been a source of mirth for those in the southern colonies, Queensland officers went on to provide the backbone of the Commonwealth Naval Forces. In 1904, when a permanent Naval Board was established, it was Captain William Rooke Creswell of Queensland and previously South Australia who was appointed as the Director of the Commonwealth Naval Forces and First Naval Member. At this time, 49% of the new force's officers had served with the Queensland Maritime Defence Force.

The Queensland Marine Defence Force was the only Australian colonial navy not to be involved in a foreign conflict.

== South Australia ==
South Australian Naval Service

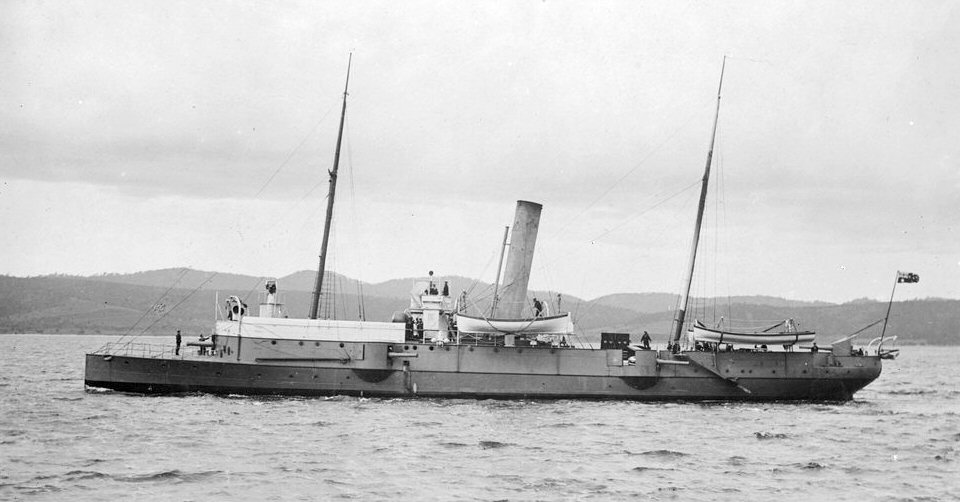
Protector in 1900

In the 1880s South Australia began initial steps towards the establishment of a naval force. Sir William Jervois, then governor of South Australia, was the strongest advocate for a colonial navy. September 1884 saw the arrival of the 920 ton ship Protector, at the time the most advanced ship in any of the colonial navies.

Protector was transferred to the Commonwealth in 1901, she also served in China during the Boxer Rebellion. The South Australian government also created a naval brigade to support the Protector. In 1905 the South Australian government negotiated the purchase of TB 191 from Tasmania, this ship was purchased as a torpedo boat and would allow the navy to use its Whitehead torpedoes which had been purchased many years earlier.

== Tasmania ==
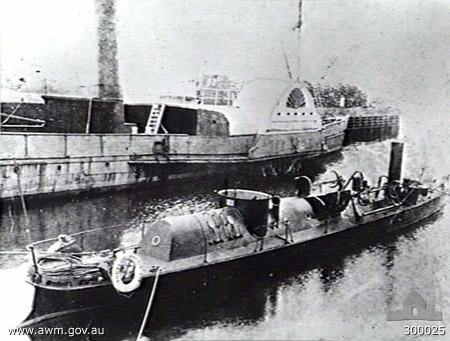
TB 191

During the mid-1830s, the colony of Van Diemen's Land constructed and operated the armed schooner Eliza. The vessel was built at Port Arthur and was operated by the Convict Marine Service, carrying out anti-piracy patrols as well as helping to maintain the security of the penal settlement. In 1883, Tasmania purchased the second-class torpedo boat TB 191. The ship arrived in Hobart on 1 May 1884 and remained in Tasmania, operated by the Tasmanian Torpedo Corps, until it was transferred to South Australia in 1905.

== Victoria ==
Victorian Naval Forces

The Colony of Victoria commenced construction of its first armed vessel in 1853, Victoria which was launched on 30 June 1855 and arrived in Victoria on 31 May 1856. Victoria carried out a large variety of tasks during its life, including taking part in the New Zealand Wars, assisting in the search for Burke and Wills, delivering the first trout eggs to Tasmania, as well as numerous surveying and rescue tasks.

In 1859 the first Naval Brigade was formed. The brigade was re-organised in 1863 as a half-militia, re-formed in 1871 as the Victorian Naval Reserve as a full militia and re-formed again in 1885 as the Victorian Naval Brigade.

The Victorian Naval Forces comprised the permanent force known as the Victorian Navy, and a 300-strong Victorian Naval Brigade consisting of the Williamstown Division and the Sandridge (Port Melbourne) Division. Combined the Victorian Navy and the Victorian Naval Brigade were known as the Victorian Naval Forces.

Following the success of Victoria, the Victorian colonial government ordered an ironclad ship, HMVS Cerberus and was gifted the composite steam-sail warship, Nelson.

In 1884 several more warships were purchased by Victoria, these included the first-class torpedo boat Childers and second-class torpedo boats Lonsdale, and Nepean and the third-class gunboats Victoria and Albert. In 1886 the turnabout torpedo boat Gordon was acquired. In 1892, the first-class torpedo boat, Countess of Hopetoun arrived in Victoria.

To supplement the ships of the permanent force a number of government vessels were modified so as to serve as gunboats or torpedo boats. The hopper barges Batman and Fawkner were modified so as to mount a six-inch breech-loading gun at the bow of each ship. Two machine guns were also fitted. Strengthening of the bow, the fitting of a magazine, shell room, crew quarters and some armour protection for the crew added two more gunboats to the fleet. A compressor fitted to Fawkner meant that the torpedo boats could be serviced at sea. The tug boat Gannet and steamer Lady Loch were likewise modified.

The Harbour Trust boats Commissioner and Customs No. 1 had two sets of torpedo dropping gear fitted to each boat thereby adding two more torpedo boats to the fleet. In 1885 the government steamers Lion and Spray were fitted with six-pounder Armstrong guns. Spray was later fitted with two sets of torpedo dropping gear.

Supporting the Victorian Naval Forces were the fortifications located at the entrance to Port Phillip Bay and other sites around the bay. In the years leading up to Federation the Victorian Naval Forces were considered the most powerful of all the colonial naval forces.

== Western Australia ==
Western Australia did not operate a colonial navy in the years before federation. Since Western Australia did not achieve self-government until 1890, the colony was forbidden from operating its own naval vessels under the Colonial Naval Defence Act 1865. However, in 1879 a militia unit, known as the Fremantle Naval Artillery was formed to assist in the defence of Fremantle Harbour. The naval artillery unit was made up of ex-Royal Navy men and merchant seamen of good character.

The unit was equipped with two brass 6-pounder field guns; these guns had no limbers, restricting their movement. These guns hindered the primary function of the naval artillery, which was to provide a mobile shore battery for the defence of Fremantle Harbour. In 1889 these guns were replaced by two 9-pounder guns, complete with limbers and wagons. The Fremantle Naval Artillery was eventually disbanded and reformed as the Fremantle Artillery Volunteers.

== Royal Navy in Australia ==
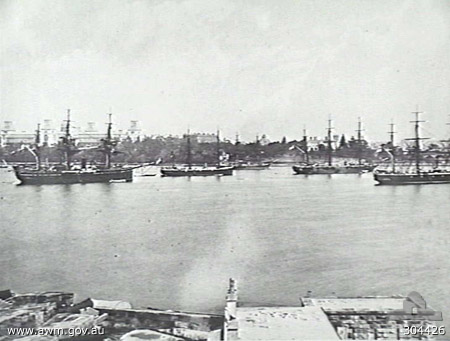
Ships of the Royal Navy's squadron on the Australia Station moored in Sydney in 1880

In the years that followed the settlement of Australia in 1788 the Royal Navy did not maintain a permanent force in the new colony. The new Port Jackson colony was placed under the protection of the East Indies Station, vessels were detached occasionally to visit the new colony. From 1821 the Royal Navy maintained a permanent man-of-war in the colony. Over the next 20 years the vessels based on Port Jackson included the sixth rates Alligator, Caroline, Conway, Imogene, and Rattlesnake, and the sloops Hyacinth, Pelorus and Zebra.

On 25 March 1859 Captain William Loring of Iris was authorised to hoist a commodore's blue pennant and to assume command as senior officer of Her Majesty's Ships on the Australia Station. This new command was independent of the Commander-in-chief, East Indies.

== Commonwealth Naval Forces ==
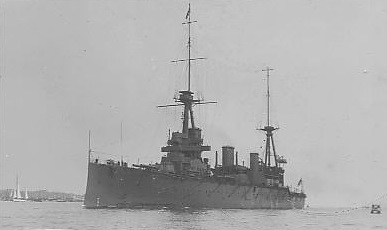
The battlecruiser HMAS Australia

The colonies maintained control over their respective navies until 1 March 1901, when the Commonwealth Naval Force was created. Initially, like the colonial forces that proceeded it, this new force also lacked ocean-going ships, and its creation did not lead to an immediate change in Australian naval policy. In 1909, Prime Minister Alfred Deakin, while attending the Imperial Conference in London, sought the British Government's agreement to end the subsidy system and develop an Australian navy. The Admiralty rejected these approaches, suggesting instead that a small fleet of destroyers and submarines would suffice. Deakin was unimpressed and had previously invited the American Great White Fleet to visit Australia in 1908. This visit had fired public enthusiasm for a modern navy and in part led to the order of two 700-ton River-class destroyers. The surge in German naval construction prompted the Admiralty to change their position in 1909 and the Royal Australian Navy was subsequently formed in 1911. On 4 October 1913, the new fleet steamed through Sydney Heads, consisting of the battlecruiser HMAS Australia, three light cruisers, and three destroyers, while several other ships were still under construction. As a consequence the navy entered the First World War as a formidable force.

== See also ==
- List of Queensland Maritime Defence Force ships
- List of Royal Australian Navy ships
