= BL 8-inch Mk I – VII naval gun =

Ordnance BL 8 inch gun Mks I - VII
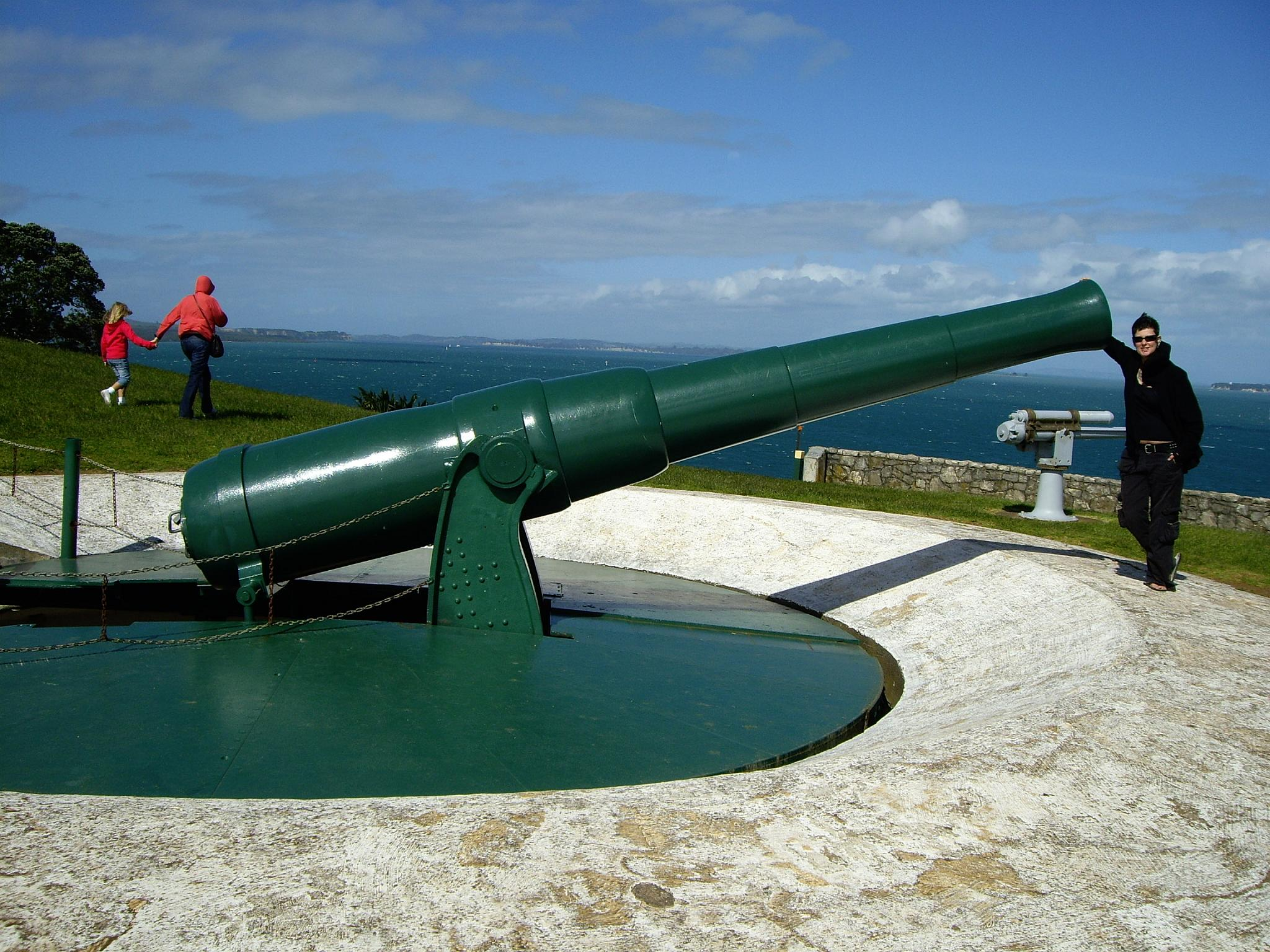
- Mk VII on disappearing carriage at North Head, Devonport, New Zealand
- Type: Naval gun Coast defence gun
- Place of origin: United Kingdom

Service history
- In service: 1884 - 190?
- Used by: United Kingdom; Colonial navies of Australia; New Zealand; Singapore

Production history
- Designer: Mk I, VI : RGF; Mk VII : EOC
- Manufacturer: Mk I, III, IV : RGF; Mk III, IV, VI, VII EOC
- Unit cost: £6,015
- Variants: Mks III, IV, VI, VII, VIIA

Specifications
- Mass: Mk III & VI : 14 tons Mk IV : 15 tons Mk VII : 12 tons Mk VIIA : 13 tons barrel & breech
- Barrel length: Mk III : 201 inches (5,105 mm); Mk VII : 204 inches (5,182 mm); Mk IV & VI : 237 inches (6,020 mm) bore
- Shell: Mks III, IV, VI : 210 pounds (95.25 kg); Mk VII : 180 pounds (81.65 kg) (Note: Different types of shell had different weights : figures are for the gun's heaviest shell. Hence for the Mk VII gun the Victorian Navy Manual of 1895 quotes Common 168 lb, Segment 177 lb, Palliser, Case & Shrapnel 180 lb)
- Calibre: 8-inch (203.2 mm)
- Muzzle velocity: Mk III : 1,953 feet per second (595 m/s); Mk IV & VI : 2,150 feet per second (655 m/s); Mk VII : 2,000 feet per second (610 m/s)
- Maximum firing range: 8,000 yards (7,300 m)

The BL 8 inch guns Mark I to Mark VII (Note: Mark I to Mark VII = Mark 1 to Mark 7. Britain used Roman numerals to denote marks (models) of ordnance until after World War II. Hence these were the first 7 models of BL 8-inch naval gun.) were the first generations of British rifled breechloaders of medium-heavy calibre. They were initially designed for gunpowder propellants and were of both 25.5 and 30 calibres lengths.

== History ==
Mks I and II were several early proof guns that did not enter British service and Mk V was not made. Limited numbers of 25.5 and 30 calibres guns were produced.

By 1885 the Royal Navy abandoned the 8-inch gun in favour of the 9.2 inch and later the 7.5 inch gun for cruisers, until 1923 when the restrictions of the Washington Naval Treaty led Britain to develop the Mk VIII 8-inch gun in order to arm heavy cruisers with the largest gun allowed by the Treaty.

In the interim Elswick Ordnance continued to develop 8-inch guns in 40 calibre and 45-calibre lengths for export, mainly to Japan.

=== Mark III ===
Mk III were low-powered 25-calibres guns mounted on :

- HMS Bellerophon as re-gunned in 1885

=== Mark IV ===
Mk IV were 30-calibres guns mounted in :

- Mersey-class cruisers of 1885

=== Mark VI ===
Mk VI were 30 calibres guns mounted in :

- Indian monitors Abyssinia and Magdala as re-gunned in 1892

=== Mark VII ===
Mk VII were lighter 25-calibres low-powered guns firing a lighter 180-pound projectile used to equip Australian colonial navies and Australian and New Zealand coastal defences in response to expected Russian expansionism in the Pacific (The "Russian scares" of the 1880s).

==== Naval service ====
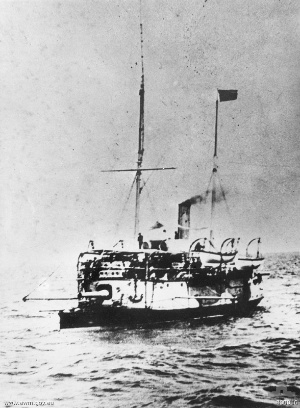
As mounted in bow of Gayundah, 1903

Mk VII guns armed the following Australian colonial gun vessels :

- HMQS Gayundah of 1884
- HMCS Protector of 1884
- HMVS Albert of 1884
- HMVS Victoria of 1884

==== Coast defence gun ====
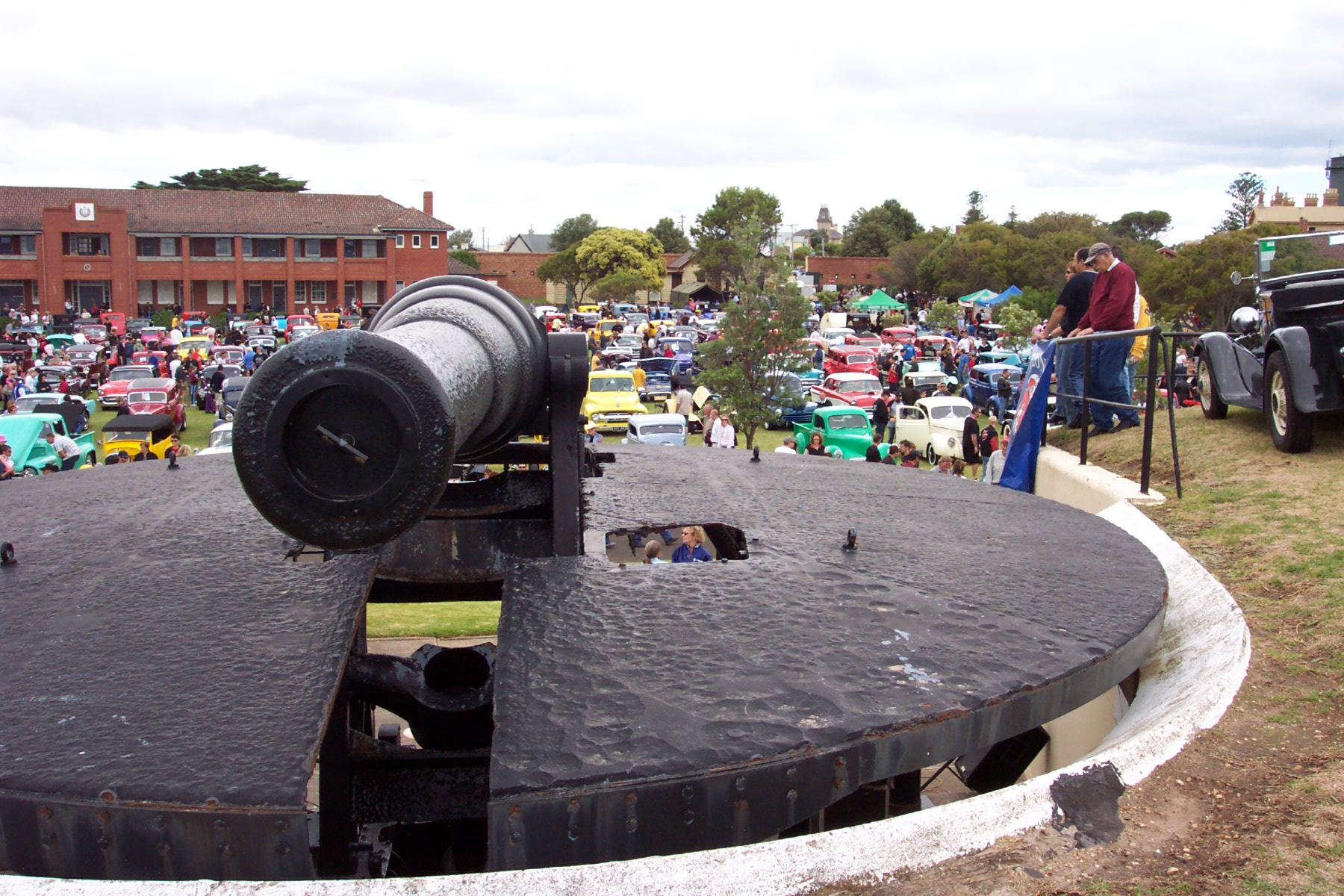
At Fort Queenscliff, Victoria, Australia

Mk VII guns were installed on disappearing mountings in Australia and New Zealand as coast-defence guns during the "Russian scares" of the 1880s. In the event, no Russian invasion occurred and the guns were rarely if ever fired.

Four Mk VII coast defence guns were installed at Singapore in the 1880s-1890s : two atop Mount Serapong and two at Fort Tanjong Katong.

== Ammunition ==
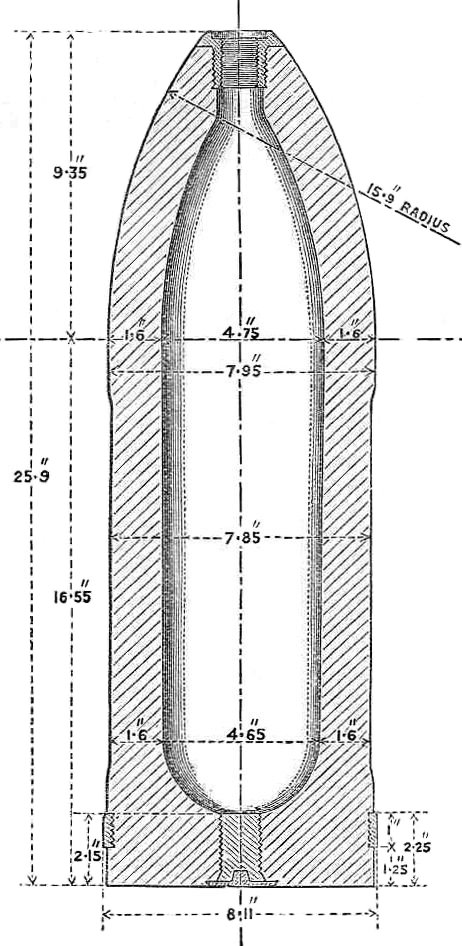
210 pound Mk I common shell

== Surviving examples ==
- Mk VII at North Head, Devonport, New Zealand
- Mk VII at summit of Mount Victoria, Auckland, New Zealand
- An unrestored Mk VII disappearing gun at Fort Jervois, Ripapa Island, New Zealand
- Mk VII at Fort Siloso, Sentosa Island, Singapore See also Photograph at Flickr
- Mk VII at Royal Artillery Museum, Woolwich, London
- A Mk VII gun from 1885 on hydro-pneumatic mounting at Fort Queenscliff, Victoria, Australia
- A pair of Mk VII guns at High Street in Westgarth / Northcote, Victoria, Australia
- A pair of Mk VII guns at Kangaroo Battery, Rosny, Tasmania, Australia (INCORRECT, these guns are 8in RML, not BL)

== See also ==
- List of naval guns
- List of coastal artillery

== Bibliography ==
- Additions to 1890 Manual for Victorian naval forces circa. 1895. HMVS Cerberus website
- Text Book of Gunnery, 1902. LONDON : PRINTED FOR HIS MAJESTY'S STATIONERY OFFICE, BY HARRISON AND SONS, ST. MARTIN'S LANE
- Tony DiGiulian, 8"/26 (20.3 cm) Mark VII
