= HMVS Albert =

Australian gunboat

History

Victoria and Australia
- Name: HMVS Albert
- Builder: Armstrong Mitchell and Co.
- Completed: 1884
- Out of service: 1897
- Reinstated: World War I

General characteristics
- Class & type: Armstrong type B1 flat-iron gunboat
- Displacement: 350 tons
- Length: 115 ft (35 m)
- Beam: 25 ft (7.6 m)
- Propulsion: Expansion steam engines
- Speed: 10 knots
- Armament: 1 × BL 8-inch (203.2 mm) Mk VII gun; 1 × BL 6-inch (152.4 mm) Mk I 80-pounder gun; 2 × 9 Pdr guns; 1-inch Nordenfelt guns

HMVS Albert was a gunboat of the Victorian Naval Forces which was requisitioned for service with the Royal Australian Navy during World War I.

== Operational history ==
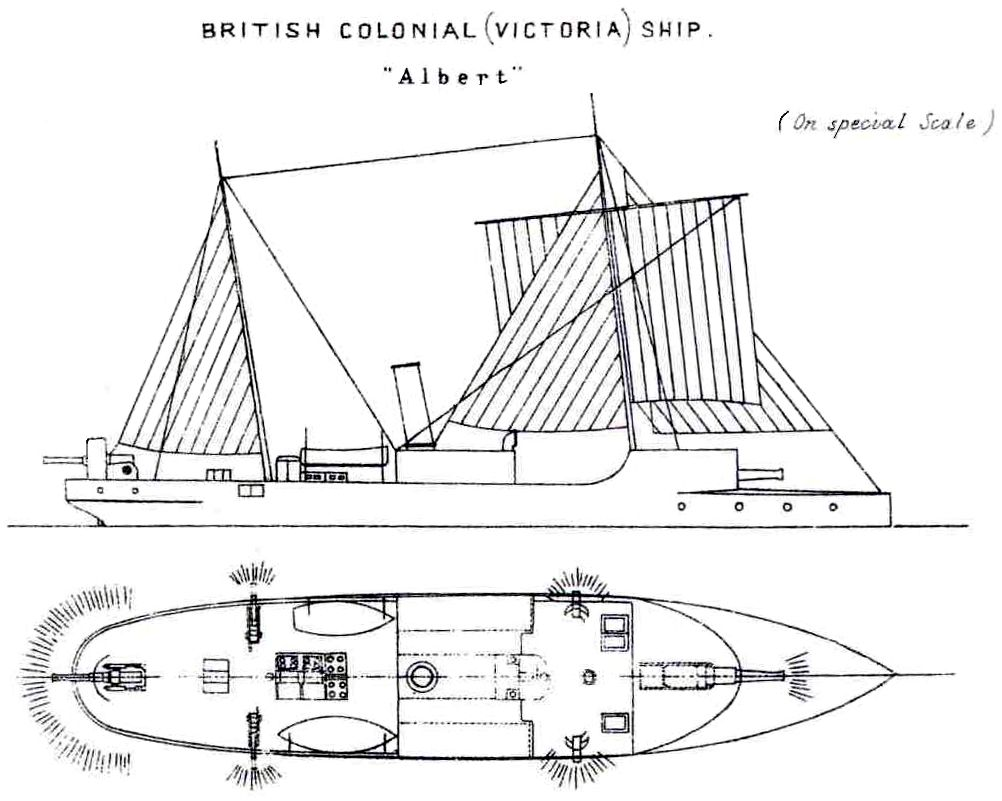
As depicted in Brassey's naval annual 1888-1889

HMVS Albert was built by Armstrong, Mitchell and Co. of Elswick, United Kingdom. Completed in early 1884, she made the voyage to Victoria in company with HMVS Victoria and HMVS Childers, arriving on 25 June.

Her time in service with the colonial navy was brief and uneventful, receiving an update for her main gun in 1890 before being paid off to reserve in 1893. In 1897 she was sold to the Victorian Public Works Department. During World War I, Albert was requisitioned with the intention of converting her to a tug, however this was cancelled before work began and she was disposed of in 1917.

== Similar ships ==
Albert was an earlier and slightly smaller near-sister ship of Gayundah and Paluma which were also built in 1884 and served with the colony of Queensland. This class was built to a type B1 flat-iron gunboat design from builders Armstrong Mitchell and Co.

== See also ==
- List of Victorian Naval Forces ships
- Colonial navies of Australia - Victoria
- List of Royal Australian Navy ships

== Bibliography ==
- Warships of Australia, Ross Gillett, Illustrations Colin Graham, Rigby Limited, 1977, ISBN 0-7270-0472-7
