= Francis Pringle Taylor =

Naval officer

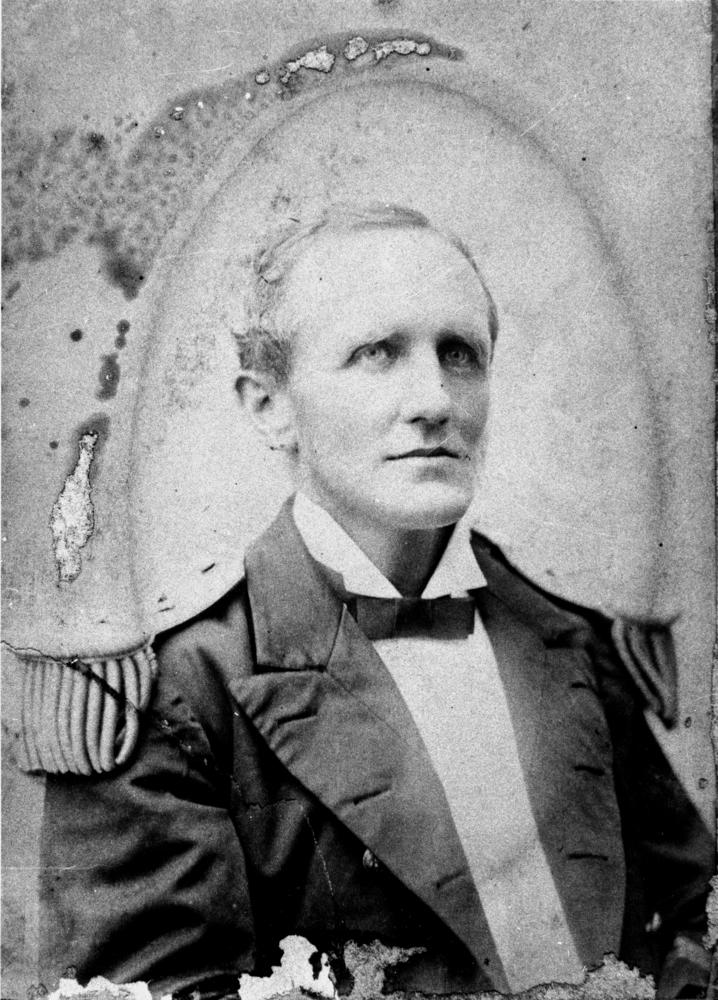
StateLibQld 2 147279 Francis Pringle Taylor, 1888

Francis Pringle Taylor (1852 – 16 February 1913) was a naval officer, the naval commandant of the Queensland colonial navy. Taylor was born in Edinburgh, the son of Rev. Robert Taylor, of Blairgowrie, Scotland, and joined the navy as a cadet in 1866. After serving in several ships he was invalided and came to Australia in 1879, where from 1880 to 1884 he was lieutenant in command of the colonial corvette HMS Wolverine. In 1884 he raised a volunteer naval artillery corps at Sydney. In 1885 he was promoted to commander of the Wolverine.

From 1888 to 1892 Taylor served in the Queensland gunboat HMQS Gayundah as first lieutenant. In October 1888 the commander of the Gayundah, Captain Henry Townley Wright, after a dispute with authorities, was ordered to turn the gunboat over to Taylor. Wright had Taylor arrested but later released him; Wright was dismissed from the Maritime Defence Force.

Taylor was later promoted to senior naval officer and superintendent of the Queensland Naval Defence Force in November 1888. In 1899 he returned to England and settled at Saltash, and in 1901 was given charge of the Naval Employment Agency at Devonport, Devon. His wife was a daughter of the late Rev. W. J. M. Hillyar and granddaughter of Admiral William Hillyar.

== Sources ==
- Frame, Tom; Baker, Kevin (2000). Mutiny! Naval Insurrections in Australia and New Zealand. St. Leonards, New South Wales: Allen & Unwin. ISBN 1-86508-351-8.
