= HMVS Nepean =

Victorian Naval Forces second-class torpedo boat

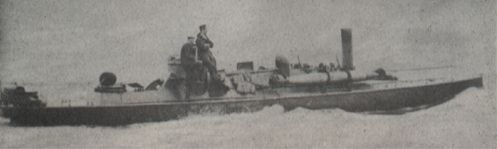
- Sister ship HMVS Lonsdale

History

Colony of Victoria
- Name: HMVS Nepean
- Operator: Victorian Naval Forces
- Builder: John I. Thornycroft & Company, Chiswick

Australia
- Name: HMAS Nepean
- Acquired: 1901
- Out of service: 1912
- Fate: Sunk on mud flats at Swan Island in 1912 after being stripped of machinery and equipment.

General characteristics
- Type: Second-class torpedo boat
- Displacement: 12.5 tons
- Length: 67 ft (20 m)
- Beam: 7.5ft
- Draught: 3.25 ft (0.99 m)
- Installed power: 150
- Speed: 17 knots (31 km/h; 20 mph) (max)
- Crew: 7
- Armament: 2 × 14-inch torpedoes; 1 × spar torpedo

HMVS Nepean was a Victorian Naval Forces second-class torpedo boat and was later operated by the Commonwealth Naval Forces and the Royal Australian Navy.

== Design and construction ==
Nepean was one of several torpedo boats ordered by the government of Victoria in 1882 to protect the colony from a possible Russian or French attack, and was built by John I. Thornycroft & Company, Chiswick.

Nepean was 67 feet (20 m) long, with a draught of 3.25 feet (0.99 m), and a displacement of 12.5 tons. She was designed with a low freeboard, to minimise her profile. The boat had a maximum speed of 17 knots (31 km/h; 20 mph).

== History ==
Due to ‘Russian scare’ of 1882, the government finalised the purchase of Nepean. Following completion in the United Kingdom on 7 July 1884 Nepean arrived in Melbourne as deck cargo on the SS Port Darwin. In 1888, improved torpedo dropping apparatus was added during modifications.

In 1901, the torpedo boats were taken over by the Commonwealth. In 1902, she was put up for auction which was unsuccessful so, until 1909 she continued to take part in manoeuvres. In 1911, she briefly became a unit of the Royal Australian Navy before being stripped of all her useful fittings at Williamstown in 1912 and being beached ashore on Swan Island.
