= HMVS Lonsdale =

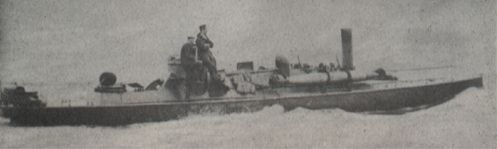
- HMVS Lonsdale

History

Colony of Victoria
- Name: HMVS Lonsdale
- Operator: Victorian Naval Forces
- Builder: John I. Thornycroft & Company, Chiswick

Australia
- Name: HMAS Lonsdale
- Acquired: 1901
- Out of service: 1912
- Fate: Sunk on mud flats at Swan Island in 1912 after being stripped of machinery and equipment.

General characteristics
- Type: Second-class torpedo boat
- Displacement: 12.5 tons
- Length: 67 ft (20 m)
- Draught: 3.25 ft (0.99 m)
- Speed: 17 knots (31 km/h; 20 mph) (max)
- Armament: 2 × 14-inch torpedoes; 1 × spar torpedo

HMVS Lonsdale was a second-class torpedo boat constructed for the Victorian Naval Forces and later operated by the Commonwealth Naval Forces and the Royal Australian Navy. She was sunk on mud flats on Swan Island in Port Phillip Bay in 1912 after being stripped of equipment and machinery. Having been commissioned in 1884, and then officially joining the Commonwealth Naval forces in 1901, the boat was the oldest ship in the Royal Navy, and is the oldest Royal Australian Navy ship still in existence (though currently buried).

== Design and construction ==
Lonsdale was one of several torpedo boats ordered by the government of Victoria in 1882 to protect the colony from a possible Russian or French attack, and was built by John I. Thornycroft & Company.

The torpedo boat was 67 feet (20 m) long, with a draught of 3.25 feet (0.99 m), and a displacement of 12.5 tons. She was designed with a low freeboard, to minimise her profile. The boat had a maximum speed of 17 knots (31 km/h; 20 mph), which she would use to close rapidly with enemy vessels before attacking. Lonsdale was initially armed with two 14-inch torpedoes carried in bow recesses, and a spar torpedo, but in 1888, she was modified to carry the two 14-inch torpedoes in locally developed 'dropping gear'; a davit-like device for lowering the torpedoes into the water for launching. She was also armed with 2 Hotchkiss machine guns.

== Fate ==
Records indicate she was sunk on mud flats on Swan Island in Port Phillip in 1912 after being stripped of equipment and machinery, however a dig later found that she had been buried in Queenscliff.

== Discovery ==
Based on the memory of a ship being buried in a finite location in Queenscliff, a team of marine historians and archaeologists started digging in the area for remains of a ship. There had been longstanding oral history of the ship being buried in this location, and some of the older locals remembered the ship before it was completely buried. When it was buried, the area was originally beach, but with the reclamation of land, the area of the burial was now 1 kilometre inland.

A team, using a digger, ground water radar and tools unfortunately found nothing. At this point, the team switched to using a water probe, searching at the depth of 1.5m, which is what they presumed to be the buried depth. In 1983, the remains of a torpedo boat likely to be the Lonsdale (or possibly the Nepean, as they are both similar) were uncovered. Ironically, they were recovered on the grounds of the Queenscliffe Maritime Museum, so the burial site had become part of a maritime museum's collection. While a great deal of work was put into discovering the boat, after the uncovering of the conning tower, all work stopped, and the boat remains buried on the site and unable to be viewed. Despite the fact the boat is the oldest Royal Australian Navy vessel currently still in existence, and it represents a rare example of a wreck accessible without having to be reclaimed using diving equipment, no effort has been made to reclaim or preserve the vessel. As of 2010, only the boat's conning tower is exposed.
