= TB 191 =

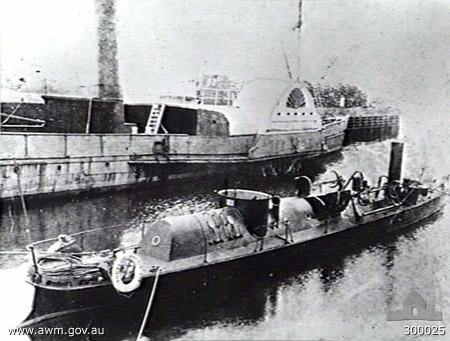
- TB 191

History
- Name: TB 191
- Owner: Colony of Tasmania; Colony of South Australia; Commonwealth Naval Forces
- Builder: John I. Thornycroft & Company, Chiswick
- Fate: Sold 1911

General characteristics
- Type: Second-class torpedo boat
- Tonnage: 12.5 t (12.3 long tons; 13.8 short tons)
- Length: 67 ft (20 m)
- Draught: 3.25 ft (0.99 m)
- Speed: 17 kn (31 km/h; 20 mph)
- Armament: 1 x Whitehead torpedo; 1 x 1-inch Nordenfelt gun

TB 191 was a second-class torpedo boat constructed for the Colony of Tasmania and later operated by the Commonwealth Naval Forces and the Royal Australian Navy. She was sold in 1911.

== Design and construction ==
TB 191 was ordered by the Australian colonial government of Tasmania in 1882 to protect the colony from possible Russian or French attack, and was built by John I. Thornycroft & Company. The torpedo boat was 67 feet (20 m) long, with a draught of 3.25 feet (0.99 m), and a displacement of 12.5 tons, similar to the other torpedo boats ordered by the other Australian colonies.

== Operational history ==
Built at a cost of £4,011, TB 191 arrived in Tasmania on board SS Abington on 1 May 1884. Operated by the Tasmanian Torpedo Corps, she appears to not have been used much in service of the Tasmanian colony. She was sold in 1905 to the Colony of South Australia, being towed to Adelaide by HMCS Protector, before becoming part of the Commonwealth Naval Forces.

She was sold in 1911.
