= Jervois-Scratchley reports =

Colonial defence reforms in Australia

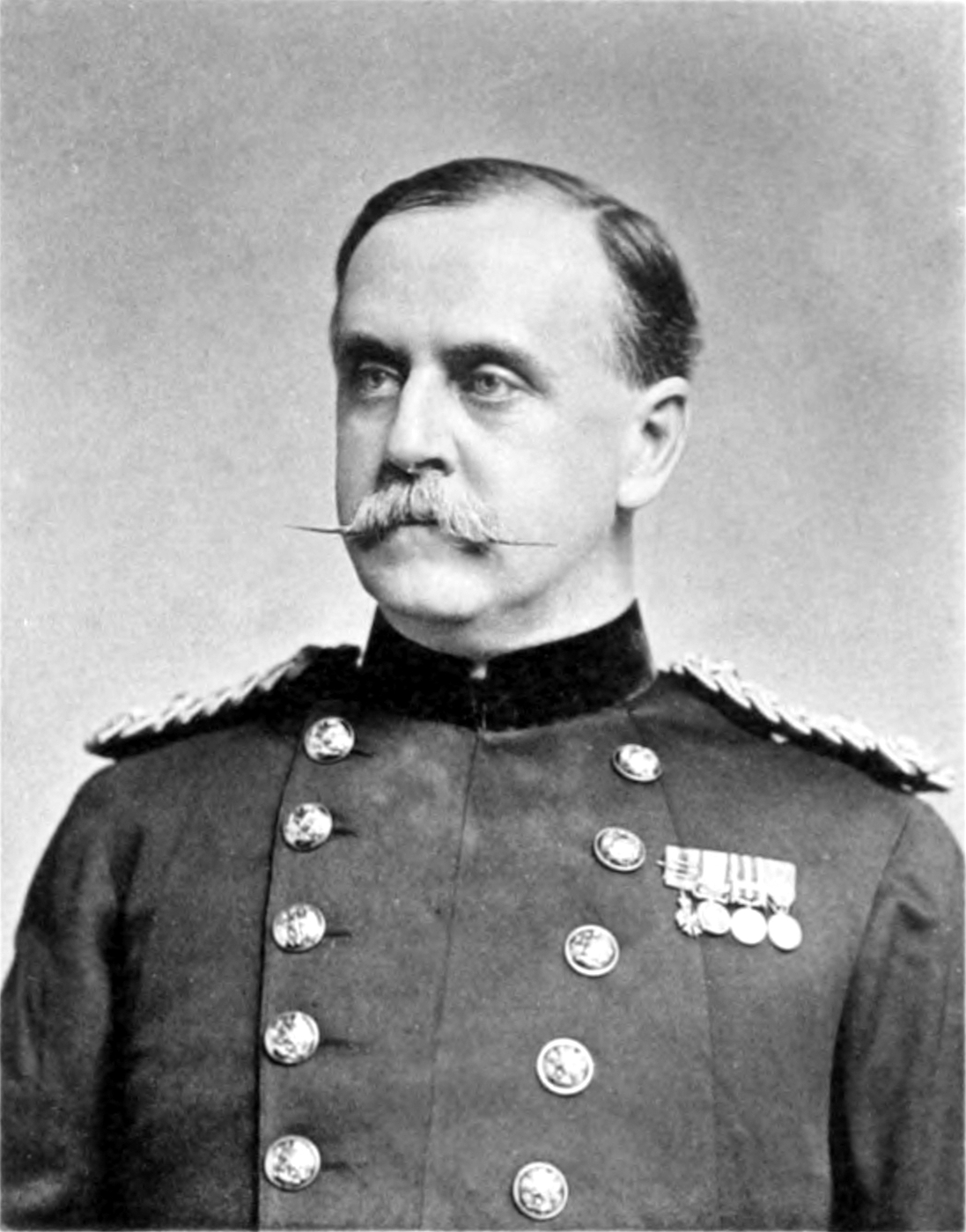
Sir Peter Scratchley who, along with William Jervois, authored the Jervois-Scratchley reports, which were instrumental in the development of Australia's colonial forces after the withdrawal of the British Army.

The Jervois-Scratchley reports of 1877 concerned the defences of the Australian colonies, and influenced defence policy into the twentieth century.

== Background ==
From the time of the first settlement in Australia, the Royal Marines, the New South Wales Corps and a succession of regiments of the British Army had been responsible for defending the Australian colonies. With the withdrawal of British garrison troops in 1870 the various colonies moved to establish more significant defences of their own.

To provide guidance, Major General Sir William Jervois and Lieutenant Colonel Peter Scratchley were commissioned by a group of colonies to advise on defence matters. The two Royal Engineers inspected each colony's defences, leading to the Jervois-Scratchley reports of 1877. These were to form the basis of defence planning in Australia and New Zealand for the next 30 years.

== Impact ==
A consequence of their reports was that colonial defences were reorganised on one model with slight variations for each colony. Wealthier colonies tended to have a higher proportion of paid permanent soldiers and militia whilst the smaller colonies opted for more volunteers. Given that a large portion of their reports concentrated on sea ports the most visible signs of their influence are the many fortifications from the 1880s and later that may be found at the entrance to the larger ports of Australia and New Zealand. These include:

- The fort on Bare Island, Botany Bay, New South Wales;
- Fort Scratchley, Newcastle, New South Wales;
- Fort Lytton, Brisbane, Queensland;
- Fort Glanville, South Australia;
- Fort Jervois, Ripapa Island, New Zealand;
- Fort Nepean and Fort Pearce on Port Phillip Bay, Victoria; and
- The Hobart coastal defences on the River Derwent, in Hobart, Tasmania.
