= Naval Offices, Brisbane =

Heritage-listed building in Brisbane, Queensland

Naval Offices
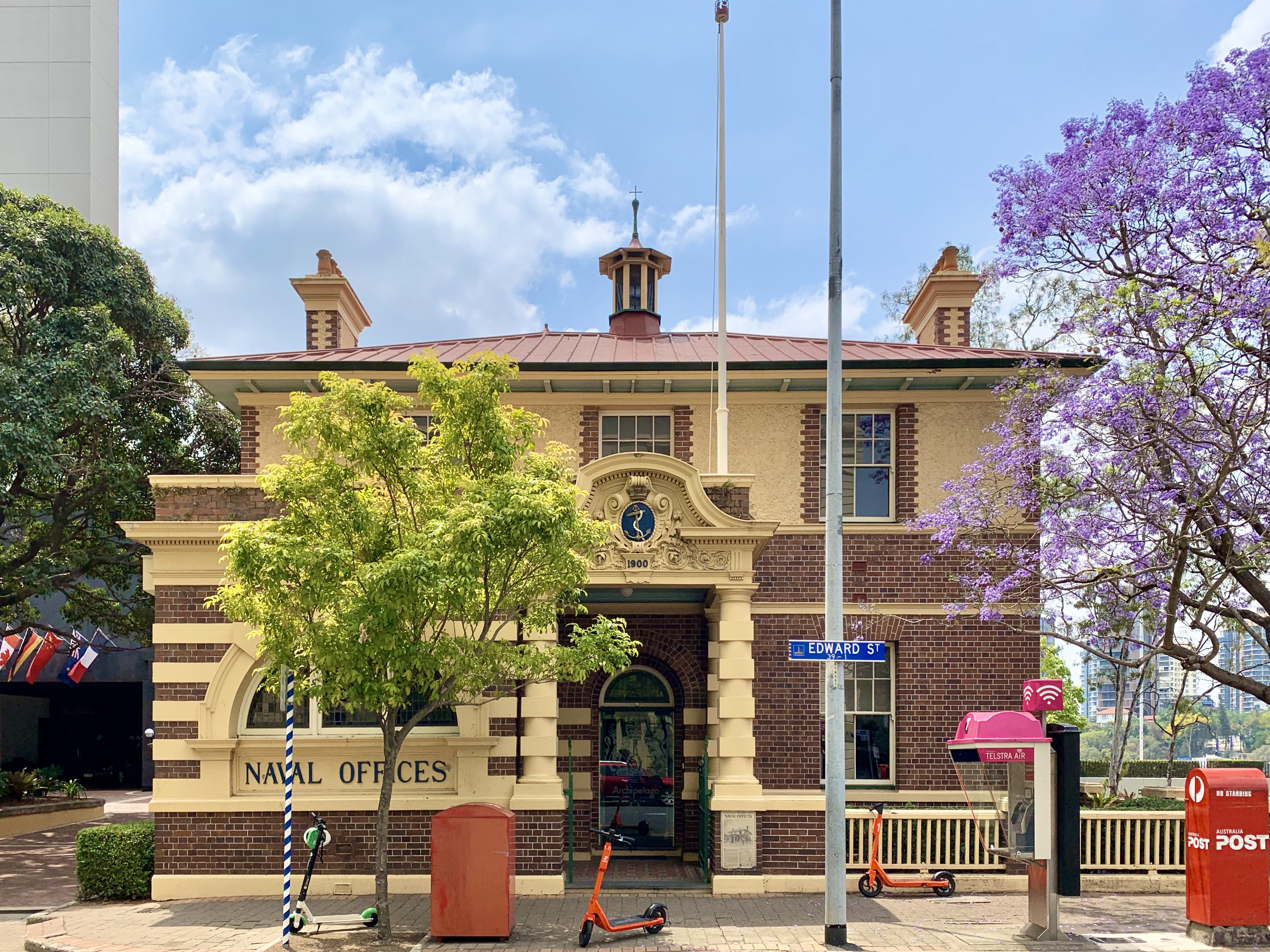
- Naval Offices, 2019

- Location within Queensland Location within Australia
- 27.4719°S 153.0307°E
- Location: 3 Edward Street, Brisbane City, City of Brisbane, Queensland, Australia

History
- Design period: 1900–1914 (early 20th century)
- Built: 1900–1901
- Built for: Queensland Marine Defence Force

Site notes
- Architect: Department of Public Works
- Architectural style: Arts & Crafts

Queensland Heritage Register
- Official name: Naval Offices (former), Brisbane, Naval Offices (former)
- Type: state heritage (built)
- Designated: 21 March 2013
- Reference no.: 600101
- Significant period: 1901–1970s
- Builders: J Mason

The Naval Offices is a heritage-listed office building at 3 Edward Street in Brisbane City, Queensland, Australia. It was designed by the Department of Public Works and was built from 1900 to 1901 by J Mason. It was added to the Queensland Heritage Register on 21 March 2013.

== History ==
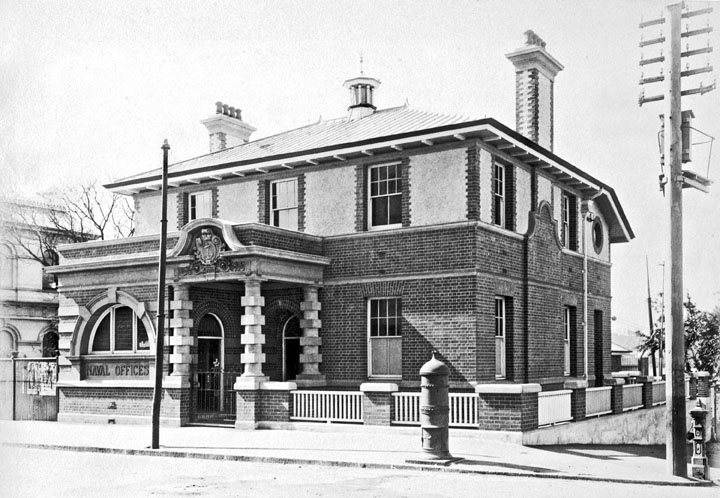
Naval Offices, around the time of construction

The brick former Naval Offices at 3 Edward Street in Brisbane was constructed in 1900–01 by the Queensland Department of Public Works as the first purpose-built headquarters for naval forces in Queensland. Built for the Queensland Marine Defence Force (QMDF), it was soon used by the Australian Commonwealth Navy (ACN). It was transferred to Commonwealth ownership in 1911 and was used by the Royal Australian Navy (RAN).

The former Naval Offices is located midway along the Town Reach (Petrie Bight to Gardens Point) of the Brisbane River, within a block bounded by Margaret, Edward and Alice streets and the river. Over time this area was used by a number of Queensland Government entities dedicated to commercial shipping, including: the Government Shipping Office, Port Office, Marine Board Office, Harbours and Rivers Department, Hydraulic Engineers and Shipping Master's departments, Marine Department and the Government Seamen's Saving Bank. A Reserve for the Harbour Master's Department of 1 rood 30 perches (1,800 m^{2}) was surveyed in 1862 between the corner of Alice and Edward streets and the river, and a stone and brick building was erected that year. Later known as the (first) Port Office, it included offices on the ground floor and store rooms and a boatshed underneath. Prior to this date the Harbour Master was based in George Street.

Military use of the immediate area started c.1886, when the QMDF occupied the 1862 Port Office. The QMDF was created in 1885 in response to fears that Queensland's coastal settlements were vulnerable to Russian warships. In the late 1870s tensions between Britain and Russia had raised concerns regarding the defence of Britain's overseas colonies. Colonel Sir William Jervois of the Royal Engineers, assisted by Lieutenant-Colonel Peter Scratchley, toured the Australian colonies to make recommendations for defence arrangements and the pair visited Queensland in August 1877. To deal with the perceived Russian naval threat to Brisbane they recommended using small naval vessels to disrupt enemy landings, a coastal fort with submarine mines across the river at Lytton, and a mobile field force of infantry and engineers with artillery. A Naval Brigade and a Torpedo Corps was also required. When the Defence Act 1884 was gazetted on 25 February 1885, the existing Queensland Volunteer Force (land forces) became the Queensland Defence Force (QDF). The Queensland Defence (Marine) Force was gazetted on 3 March 1885.

Lieutenant Walton Drake had taken command of the Naval Brigade from 1 January 1885, tasked with training volunteers. Two 50-strong companies of Brisbane naval volunteers were announced that month and additional naval brigades were later formed at other Queensland ports, including Townsville, Rockhampton, Maryborough, Cairns, Cooktown, Bundaberg, Thursday Island and Mackay.

Naval vessels were also ordered as part of the proposed plan to defend Queensland. The first vessel of Queensland's new navy to be delivered was the steel, second-class spar torpedo boat "Mosquito", which arrived as deck cargo in Brisbane in October 1884. Prior to this the closest thing that Queensland had to a naval vessel was the Queensland Government schooner "Pearl", which conducted survey work and guarded the pearling fisheries in northern Queensland waters.

The main strength of the QMDF, the sister Alpha class gunboats "Gayundah" (meaning Thunder) and "Paluma" (Lightning), ordered from Britain in 1883 and launched in 1884, arrived in March 1885 and May 1885 respectively.

The "Gayundah" sailed to Queensland under Commander (later Captain) Henry Townley Wright, a retired Royal Navy officer. Wright was appointed as Senior Naval Officer (SNO) and Superintendent of the QMDF on 30 March 1885, as well as remaining in command of the "Gayundah". Those of the crew who elected to remain in Queensland's service became the first permanent members of the QMDF. The "Gayundah" was used to train QMDF seamen, while the "Paluma" was used on survey work by the British Admiralty until being handed back to Queensland in 1895. The last regular vessel of the QMDF was the "Midge", a mahogany timber picquet boat/spar torpedo boat, which arrived in 1888.

Auxiliary vessels in the QMDF included a locally-built steamer "Miner", and the government steamer "Otter". Five steam hopper barges of the Harbours and Rivers Department (Queensland Maritime Defence Force Auxiliary Gunboats), the "Bonito", "Stingaree", "Dolphin", "Bream" and "Pumba", could also be armed if required for port defence.

A Permanent Force, HMQS Gayundah, QDF (Marine), was established in February 1892, but most of its full-time crew were paid off in 1893 as part of cutbacks during the 1890s depression, as was the 'Paluma's' crew after the ship had completed its survey work. For most of the 1890s the gunboats were used by naval brigade crews solely for training.

In and near Brisbane, a number of buildings were erected for the QMDF. The Naval Stores (Naval Stores, Kangaroo Point) and a wharf were built at the base of the Kangaroo Point cliffs in 1886–87, across the river from the QMDF headquarters on Edward Street. A sub-marine mining (naval mine) store was erected c.1886 at Fort Lytton (Fort Lytton National Park), and a sub-marine mining drill hall was later built at the west end of Alice Street in 1900.

By 1896, the old Port Office used by the QMDF was in a poor state and the foundations, inundated during the 1893 floods, were settling and causing wall cracks. On 1 August 1899 the QMDF's Staff Paymaster, Edward Vincent Pollock, also complained that the roof was leaking water onto his paperwork. Later that month £1500 was allocated by the Department of Public Works for the construction of new offices.

In May 1900 it was decided by Queensland's new Naval Commandant, Captain William Rooke Creswell, that the new offices would replace the cottage of the Marine Department's messenger/caretaker at the corner of Edward and Alice Streets. Tenders were invited in late August and the cottage was demolished.

Plans for the new Naval Offices were approved by AB Brady, the Government Architect within the Department of Public Works (DPW), on 14 September 1900, but since he was trained as an engineer it is unlikely to be his design. The DPW employed a number of accomplished architects at this time and the work could be attributed to Thomas Pye (First Assistant Architect from July 1899), John Smith Murdoch (Second Assistant Architect from 1 July 1899), or George David Payne (Temporary Draughtsman 1898–1901). Pye supervised larger works, while Murdoch took charge of the designing and drafting staff.

The Department of Public Works was involved in the design and construction of Queensland's most important buildings and capital works following its formation in 1866. Employing a succession of highly talented architects, the Department produced many fine buildings of high architectural merit. Prior to World War II these buildings were characterised by: highly-functional, rational plan arrangements that were commodious and accommodating; use of high- quality, durable materials, preferably sourced from Queensland; and a quality of civic dignity brought about through style, scaling, and form.

The tender of James Mason of Brisbane of £1845/17/6 for the Brisbane Naval Offices was accepted in October 1900, and the building was completed by late June 1901. "The Queenslander" reported on 16 November 1901 that the building's facing bricks were dark-brown, relieved with cement dressings and rough-cast work. The roof was covered with rolled galvanised iron. The Annual Report for DPW to 30 June 1901 (where the Naval Offices was listed under principal works completed during the year) mentioned internal fittings of pine and cedar. No other Australian colony built naval offices in this period, just prior to Federation and the transfer of defence assets. Queensland may have done so to ensure the continued use of Brisbane by the Commonwealth Navy.

As a naval headquarters, the building was designed with spaces for the senior naval officers and their administrative staff, along with a strong room for the Staff Paymaster. The original ground floor plan included an entry porch off Edward Street, with double doors leading north-west into a public space which was separated by a counter from the Clerk's office. There was also a set of double doors leading north-east into a vestibule between the front offices, and onwards into a central hall. To the rear of the Clerk's Office was the Paymaster's Office, which included a projecting strong room at the rear of the building. The right front (southern) office was for the Commandant, while the right rear (eastern) office was for the Officer of the Naval Corps. Each had a fireplace.

Behind the Naval Corp's office was the separate Brigade Entrance. From this entrance the ground floor rear verandah could be accessed, as well as a stairway up to a landing from which people could either descend to the ground floor offices, or continue up to the first floor. The latter was a large open space used as an Orderly (Administrative) Room, with four fireplaces and a small lavatory and store at the right rear (eastern) corner. This space may have been later partitioned for sleeping quarters and offices. The 1900 plans do not show the ventilation fleche which was present on the roof when the building was finished. This fleche was removed by the mid 1980s, and was replicated in the 1990s.

Although the QMDF existed when the building was started, the first occupants were technically the Queensland components of a Commonwealth Navy. After the Australian Commonwealth was formed on 1 January 1901 the defence forces of the separate colonies were transferred to the new Federal Government in March. However, procedural delays meant arrangements were not completed until 1902.

At the time of Federation, Queensland's naval forces numbered 750 men of all ranks, and it was one of four states (including Victoria, New South Wales and South Australia) to contribute ships to the Australian Commonwealth Naval Force (ACNF), formed on 1 March 1901 – handing over the "Gayundah", "Paluma", "Mosquito" and "Midge". Captain Creswell remained the Commandant of the Queensland-based flotilla of the ACN. In late 1904 Captain Creswell was appointed Director of Commonwealth Naval Forces, and his place as Queensland Naval Commandant was taken by Captain Frederick Tickell (to 1907). By 1904, 49% of Australia's serving naval officers had served in the QMDF.

Captain Creswell was a major advocate for an independent Australian navy. Australia had been a separate British Naval Station since 1859 and a squadron of the Royal Navy was maintained in Australian waters until 1913. After March 1901 the Royal Navy was still paid to provide blue water defence (a force projection capability beyond coastal defence), but Captain Creswell lobbied for an autonomous Australian blue water navy. The 1909 Imperial Conference agreed to form an Australian fleet, and the first ships of this fleet, the destroyers "Yarra" and "Parramatta", reached Australia in 1910. On 10 July 1911 King George V granted the title "Royal Australian Navy" to the ACN and in October 1913 formal control of these units was transferred to the Commonwealth Naval Board. Meanwhile, in 1911 district naval officers were appointed around Australia to replace the naval commandants.

Although the Commonwealth took control of Queensland's naval forces in 1901, the Naval Offices was not transferred to Commonwealth ownership until 1911. The state Department of Public Works was still maintaining the building in 1910 and it was still in Queensland ownership in June 1911.

A number of alterations were made to the Naval Offices during Commonwealth ownership. February 1933 plans included the addition of a first floor rear verandah with an enclosed laundry and new stairs from the side yard. At the same time the first floor was converted into a residence for the Senior Naval Officer, and the large space was partitioned into domestic rooms. The internal stairway from the main ground floor hall was removed, so the upstairs residence could only be accessed from the old Brigade Entrance or the new rear verandah. Two sets of French doors plus a single door were installed between the verandah and the residence. A "typiste" (typists) room was added to the north-west end of the original ground floor rear verandah, and a new lavatory was added behind the strong room. Further additions in late 1939 resulted in a new office, lavatory and water closet (WC) being built behind the strong room, replacing the 1933 lavatory. Two other WCs were also built sometime between 1933 and 1939 on and adjacent to the rear verandah.

After Japan entered World War II in December 1941, Brisbane became an important supply and command centre and the resulting expansion of the Allied naval presence in the city meant larger Naval Staff Offices were urgently required. During 1942–43 commercial buildings in Queen Street were requisitioned and occupied by the Australian and United States navies. Although the Operational Staff of the RAN's Naval Officer in Charge (NOIC), Queensland, was based in Queen Street, the District Naval Officer, Queensland, remained at the Edward Street Naval Offices with the Civil Secretariat and Accounts staffs. Other wartime RAN facilities in Brisbane were located at Colmslie and New Farm. The Smellie and Co. warehouse (Old Mineral House) opposite the Naval Offices was used by the US Red Cross before becoming an Australian Comforts Fund hostel for the Royal Navy in 1945.

Further alterations were made to accommodate the extra staff at the Naval Offices. In 1944 a two-storey timber office extension was added behind the existing verandahs, the verandahs were enclosed as offices, and toilet arrangements were reconfigured. The stairway to the first floor 1933 verandah was removed, as was the first floor verandah laundry. The original steps up to the rear yard from Alice Street were removed and replaced with steps that climbed south-west to the side yard.

By 1977 the former Naval Offices was vacant, its functions having been transferred to HMAS Moreton at New Farm (naval base, closed 1994). The Edward Street site was surplus to Commonwealth requirements but, as it was included on the Register of the National Estate by this time, a decision was made to lease the property for 99 years rather than sell it. This enabled conditions protecting the heritage values of the original section of the former Naval Offices to be written into the lease. The building was leased to Jakuma Limited in November 1981. The lease was transferred to Historic Holdings Pty Ltd in 1987, and to HSH Hotels (Australia) Limited in 2000.

From 1982 the former Naval Offices was used as Muddies Seafood Restaurant, and alterations were made including removing walls between the ground floor offices, constructing a new stair in the ground floor hall, removing internal partitions in the rear timber extensions on both levels, a new kitchen fit-out on the first floor, and adding a fire escape stair to the rear.

After the restaurant closed in 1989, the building was vacant for a period before being refurbished in the early 1990s. This refurbishment was designed by Bruce Buchanan Architects and saw the restoration of lost or obscured significant fabric. The 1944 office extensions to the rear of the building were demolished and the rear verandah was reconstructed. The ground floor toilets were upgraded, partitions were reinstated between the offices on the ground floor, and the first floor partitions were removed to make one large space. At some time after this work the first floor was again partitioned into rooms although these walls do not reach the ceiling. A new kitchenette was built at the rear eastern corner of the first floor.

Behind the former Naval Offices, the Stamford Hotel, a large multi-storey building, was constructed in 1990 and a boardwalk was built behind the former Naval Offices along the river edge. However, a visual connection between the former Naval Offices and the river was maintained. The flagpole at the front of the building is not an original feature, but was there by World War II; while the four flagpoles located near the rear northern corner of the building date from between 1974 and 1991. The building was returned to Queensland State Government ownership in 2011, and in 2012 the ground floor was occupied by a florist, while an architectural firm and a property developer sub-leased the first floor.

== Description ==
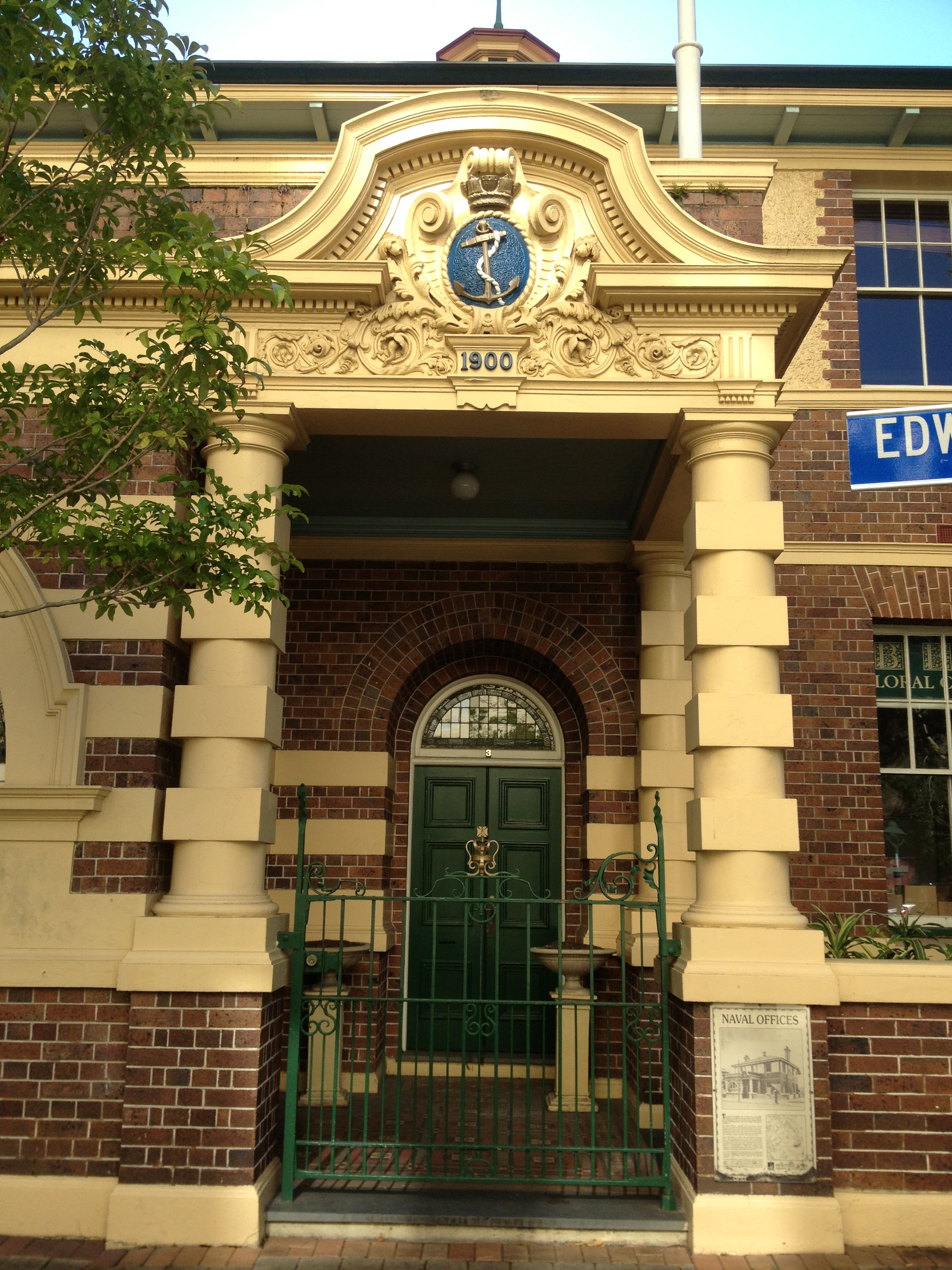
Building entrance, 2013

The former Naval Offices is a two-storey brick building on the corner of Edward and Alice streets, Brisbane, adjacent to and overlooking the Brisbane River. The building occupies the majority of the allotment with a small yard behind. Primary entrance is from Edward Street with a secondary entrance from the Alice Street road reserve.

The building is of load-bearing brick construction with timber floor and roof structure. A two-storey timber verandah at the rear overlooks the yard to the river and is not of cultural heritage significance. The building elevations are face brick in English bond, with the upper level finished in stucco with face brick quoining to the corners and around windows. The bricks are deep red with contrasting pale grey tuck pointing. Windows are large and rectangular with brick lintels and timber-framed, double-hung sashes with slender, moulded-timber glazing bars. There is one circular window on the upper level of the Alice Street side closest to the river. The hipped roof overhangs the upper floor, has bracketed timber eaves and is clad with roll and pan metal sheet. There is a central metal octagonal ventilation fleche on the ridge and two tall chimneys flank the sides of the building.

The building is two-storey with an asymmetrical, single-storey projection to Edward Street accommodating the entry portico and former public reception area. The building is notable for its Arts and Crafts decorative treatments including: extensive use of high-quality, tuck pointed face brickwork and stucco; rendered dressings; tall decorative brickwork chimneys with chimney pots; decorative eaves brackets; a prominent semi-circular window flanked by horizontal bands of render; and rusticated Tuscan order columns and a curved pediment with a sculpted naval coat of arms to the portico.

A decorative wrought iron gate opens to the entry portico where the floor is finished with tessellated encaustic tiles with slate thresholds and the ceiling is v-jointed timber boards. There are two adjacent entry doors from the porch; both are timber double doors with leaded fanlights. The larger door opens into the hall via a small foyer and the smaller door into the front room which is divided into two parts by a large arched opening.

The ground floor plan is organised around a central stair hall running front to back with two main rooms on either side. The ground floor has vinyl-covered, timber floors; plaster walls; moulded timber skirtings, architraves and cornices; and v-jointed timber board ceilings with decorative timber fretwork vents. Floor-to-ceiling height on the ground floor is 3.6 metres (12 ft). The main rooms have a fireplace each with a simple moulded plaster surround and mantle, and a decorative cast-iron firebox. The rear northern room has a strong room with a heavy iron door. The doors into the four rooms are varnished timber with moulded panels and rectangular glazed fanlights. The ground floor offices are numbered 1 to 4, and the interior double doors to the foyer carry the words "Commonwealth of Australia Naval Office" on the glass.

A large plaster royal coat of arms is positioned above the doors of the small entry foyer. The timber half-turn stair has a decorative timber balustrade and a small cleaner's cupboard with sink is underneath.

The rear verandah of the ground floor leads to male and female toilets (1991) that are not considered to be of cultural heritage significance. A rear yard has an enclosure for mechanical equipment and a garden with trees and shrubs – the vegetation is not considered to be of cultural heritage significance. Four flagpoles are located at the northern rear corner of the building and are not of cultural heritage significance.

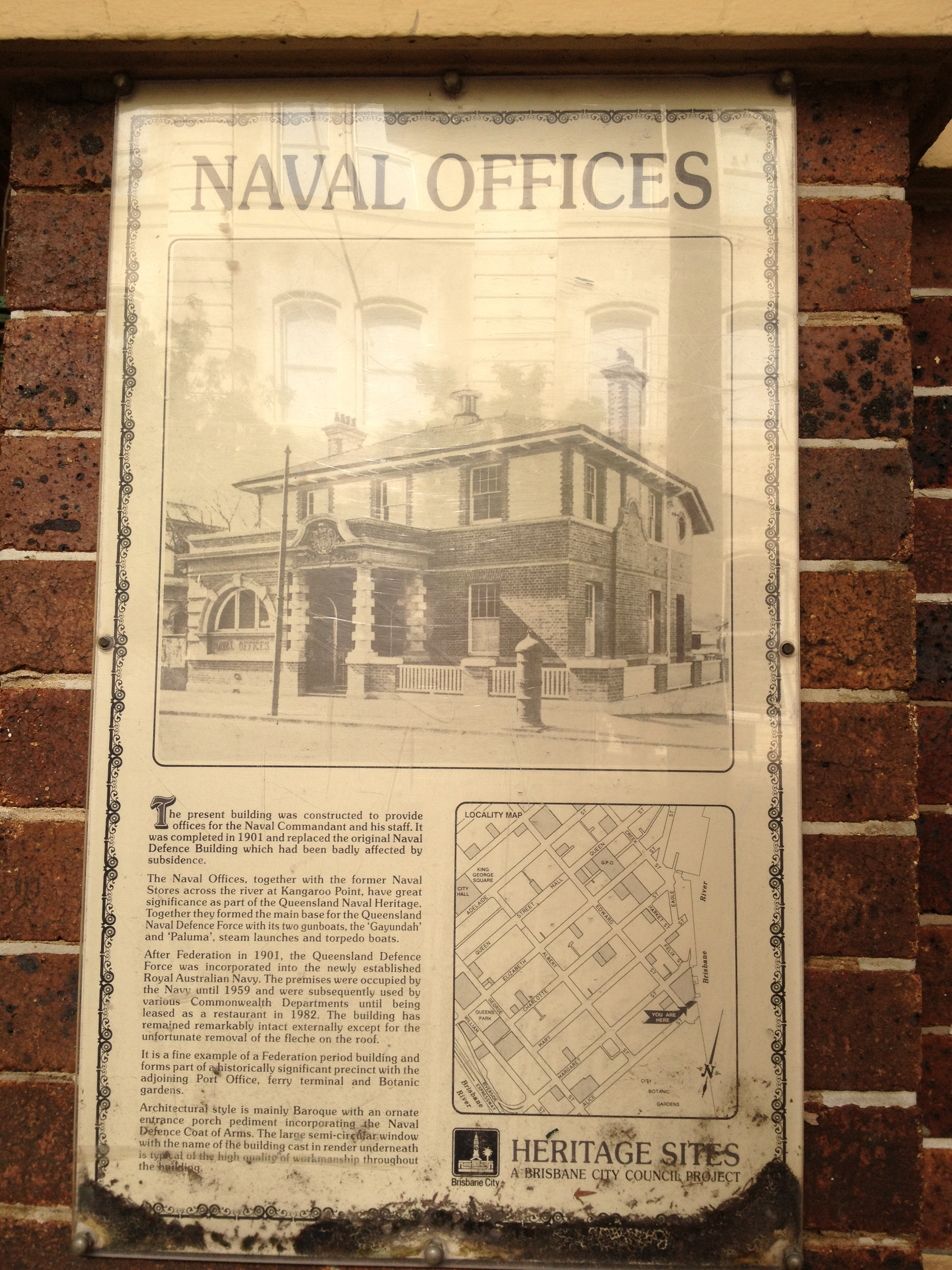
Plaque on the Naval Offices outlining its history, 2013

On the Alice Street side concrete stairs lead into a narrow side yard enclosed by a short, brick and timber fence. This yard wraps around the building along this side to meet the front porch on Edward Street. The Alice Street entrance door is timber v-jointed boards, ledged and braced, with a rectangular fanlight. The threshold is a single, large slate. This door opens to a small hall and stair up to the landing of the main stair which rises to the first floor. French doors open into the stair landing from the first floor rear verandah at a height above floor level, indicating a previous floor and stair configuration.

The first floor has carpet covered timber floors, plaster walls, simple timber skirtings and cornices, moulded timber architraves, and a ripple iron ceiling with metal ventilation panels. The floor is divided by timber partitions that are not full height. A layout of previous partitions is visible on the ceiling. There are four non- functional fireplaces without mantle or firebox. A rear room contains a kitchen. Timber-framed, glazed French doors and a clear-finished panelled timber door open onto the rear verandah from the rear rooms of the first floor.

The former Naval Offices is a small building within a streetscape of larger structures featuring other late-nineteenth and early-twentieth century masonry buildings including the former Port Office, Old Mineral House (Smellie & Co. warehouse), Smellie's Building, and the Port Office Hotel and is adjacent to the entrance gates of the City Botanic Gardens. The building is visible from the Brisbane River and there is a sight line from the former Naval Offices to the former Naval Stores at Kangaroo Point across the river.

== Heritage listing ==
The former Naval Offices was listed on the Queensland Heritage Register on 21 March 2013 having satisfied the following criteria.

The place is important in demonstrating the evolution or pattern of Queensland's history.

The 1901 former Naval Offices, Brisbane, is important surviving evidence of the existence of the Queensland Marine Defence Force (QMDF, established 1885) and the later policy of basing Australian naval vessels in Queensland. Although the QMDF ceased to exist soon after the building was finished, it was used by the Australian Commonwealth Navy (ACN) and then the Royal Australian Navy (RAN) until the 1970s.

Constructed by the Queensland Government as the first purpose-built headquarters for naval forces in Queensland, the former Naval Offices illustrates the importance placed on the naval defence of Queensland at the time of Federation.

The place demonstrates rare, uncommon or endangered aspects of Queensland's cultural heritage.

The intact and distinctive former Naval Offices is unique as the only naval headquarters building constructed by the Queensland government.

The place is important in demonstrating the principal characteristics of a particular class of cultural places.

The former Naval Offices is a fine example of the well-designed buildings constructed by the Queensland Department of Public Works. The building has a highly-functional, rational plan; is well constructed using high-quality, durable materials sourced from Queensland; and has a quality of civic dignity achieved through style, scaling, and form.

The place is important in demonstrating the principal characteristics of a naval office. In particular its internal layout illustrates its former naval administrative use, with a separate front entrance for the public and a side entrance for the Naval Brigade leading to the first floor, separate offices on the ground floor, and a strong room.

The place is important because of its aesthetic significance.

The former Naval Offices is important for its aesthetic significance through an accomplished use of Arts and Crafts decorative treatments. These include: an asymmetrical composition; extensive use of high-quality, tuck-pointed face brickwork and stucco; rendered dressings; tall chimneys with decorative chimney pots; decorative eaves with brackets; circular accents; contrasting earthy colours and textures; a conspicuous use of hand-crafted ornamentation; ornate decorative features of the portico including rusticated Tuscan order columns and a curved pediment with a sculpted naval coat of arms.

As a finely crafted, small-scale building, the former Naval Offices makes an important contribution to the streetscape of the Lower Edward Street precinct of late nineteenth and early twentieth century buildings including the Port Office, Smellie & Co. warehouse (Old Mineral House), Smellie's Building and the Port Office Hotel; as well as the City Botanic Gardens.

The place has a special association with the life or work of a particular person, group or organisation of importance in Queensland's history.

The former Naval Offices has a long-standing and important historical association with the naval forces of Queensland and Australia, being built for the QMDF before being used by the Queensland flotilla of the ACN, and later the RAN, between 1901 and the mid 1970s.
