= Port Office Hotel =

Heritage-listed building in Brisbane, Queensland

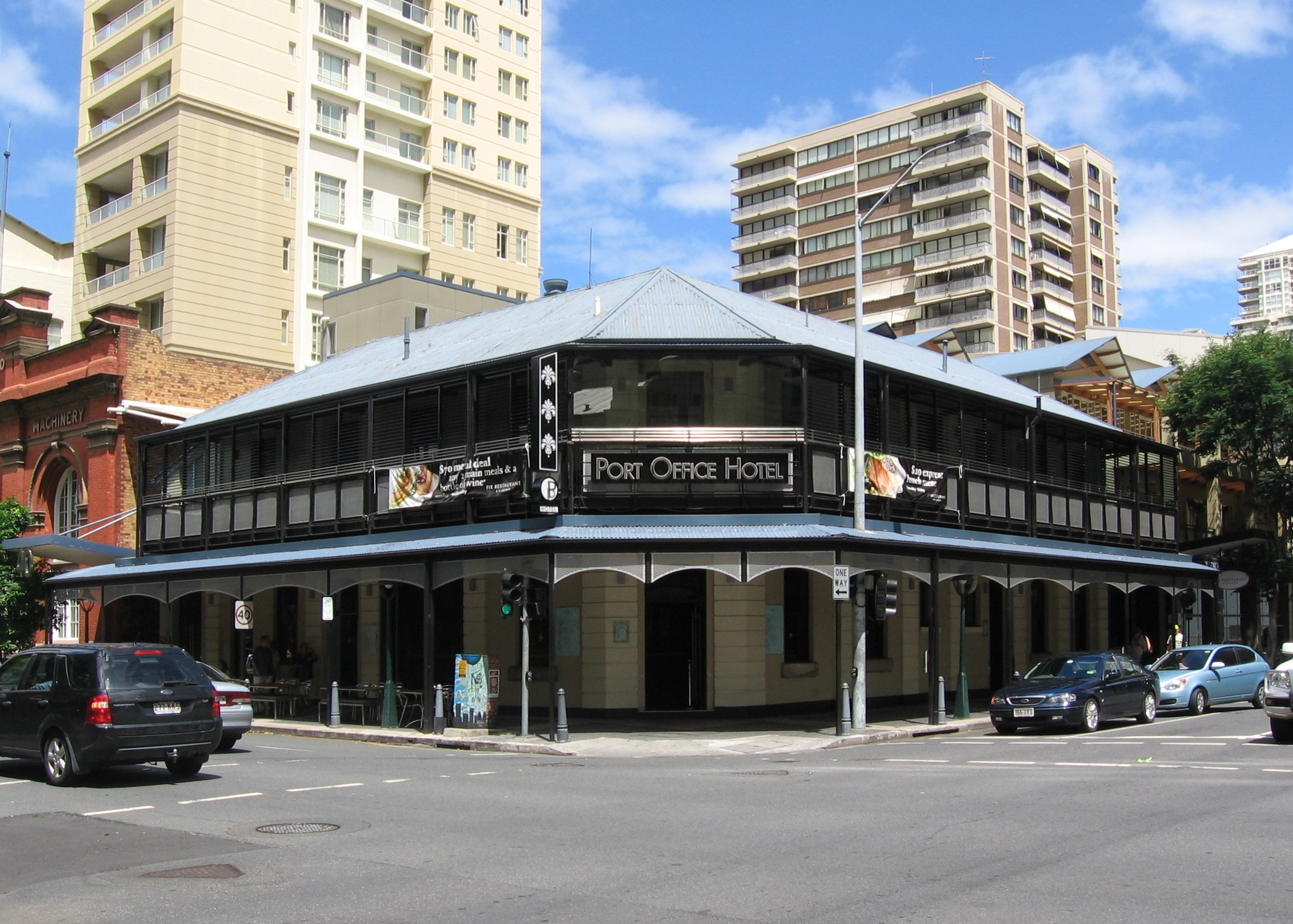
- Port Office Hotel, 2010

- Location within Queensland Location within Australia
- 27.4717°S 153.0298°E
- Location: 40 Edward Street, Brisbane City, City of Brisbane, Queensland, Australia

History
- Design period: 1870s–1890s (late 19th century)
- Built: 1876

Site notes
- Architect: James Cowlishaw

Queensland Heritage Register
- Official name: Port Office Hotel, Shamrock Hotel
- Type: state heritage (built)
- Designated: 21 October 1992
- Reference no.: 600098
- Significant period: 1876 (fabric); 1909 (historical)
- Significant components: furniture/fittings, store/s / storeroom / storehouse
- Builders: Charles Midson

Port Office Hotel is a heritage-listed hotel at 40 Edward Street, Brisbane City, City of Brisbane, Queensland, Australia. It was designed by James Cowlishaw and built from 1876 by Charles Midson. It was also known as Shamrock Hotel. It was added to the Queensland Heritage Register on 21 October 1992.

== History ==
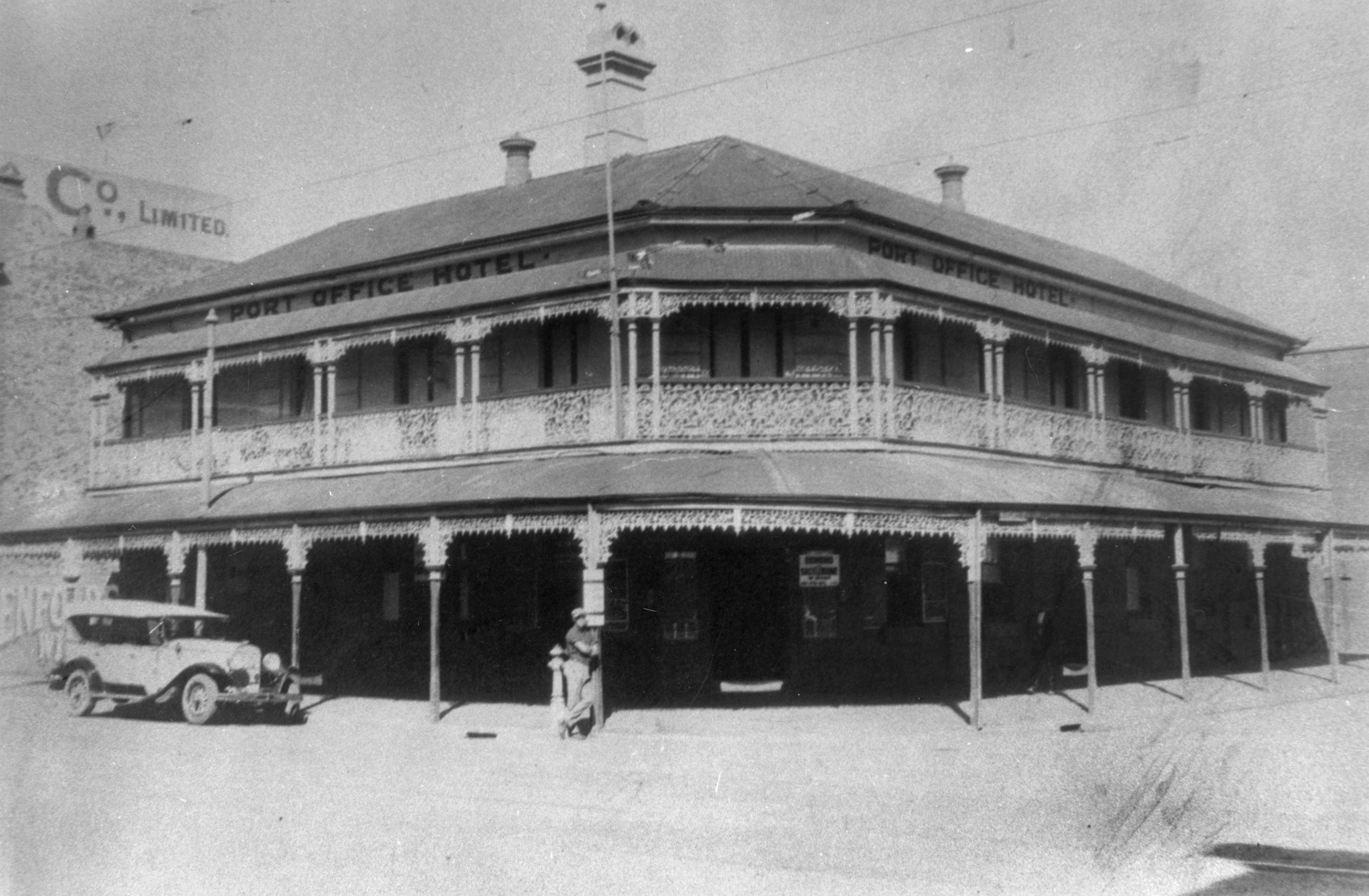
Port Office Hotel Brisbane, circa 1929

The first hotel on this site was opened in May 1864 and was known as the Shamrock Hotel.

In late 1876 the Shamrock Hotel was reconstructed as a two-storey masonry building with verandahs. It was designed by James Cowlishaw with Charles Midson the contractor.

In 1888 the remodelled hotel was described as being "extremely commodious, containing (besides public and private bars and an attractive clubroom) fifteen bedrooms, a drawing room, two bath rooms and four public rooms on the ground floor". The hotel was patronised by workers from nearby shipping and industrial and riverside businesses.

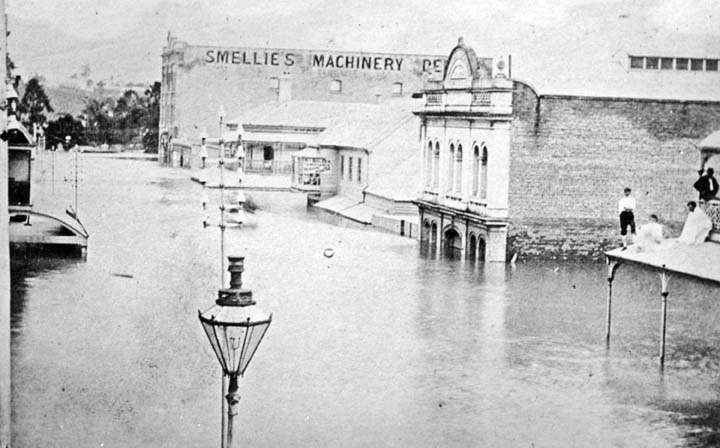
Shamrock Hotel (to the right of Smellie building) was flooded during the 1893 flood; the ground floor awnings are at the level of the flood waters

The building was flooded in the 1893 Brisbane flood.

With the change of licensee c. 1909, John Chillan Cutbush renamed the hotel the Port Office Hotel.

In 1955 the hotel was refurbished under the direction of architect Francis Leo Cullen. This work included the removal of all the verandahs, lacework, canopies and chimneystacks and renovation of the interior fittings.

The hotel was flooded in the 1974 Brisbane flood.

During the 1980s further internal renovations have been undertaken.

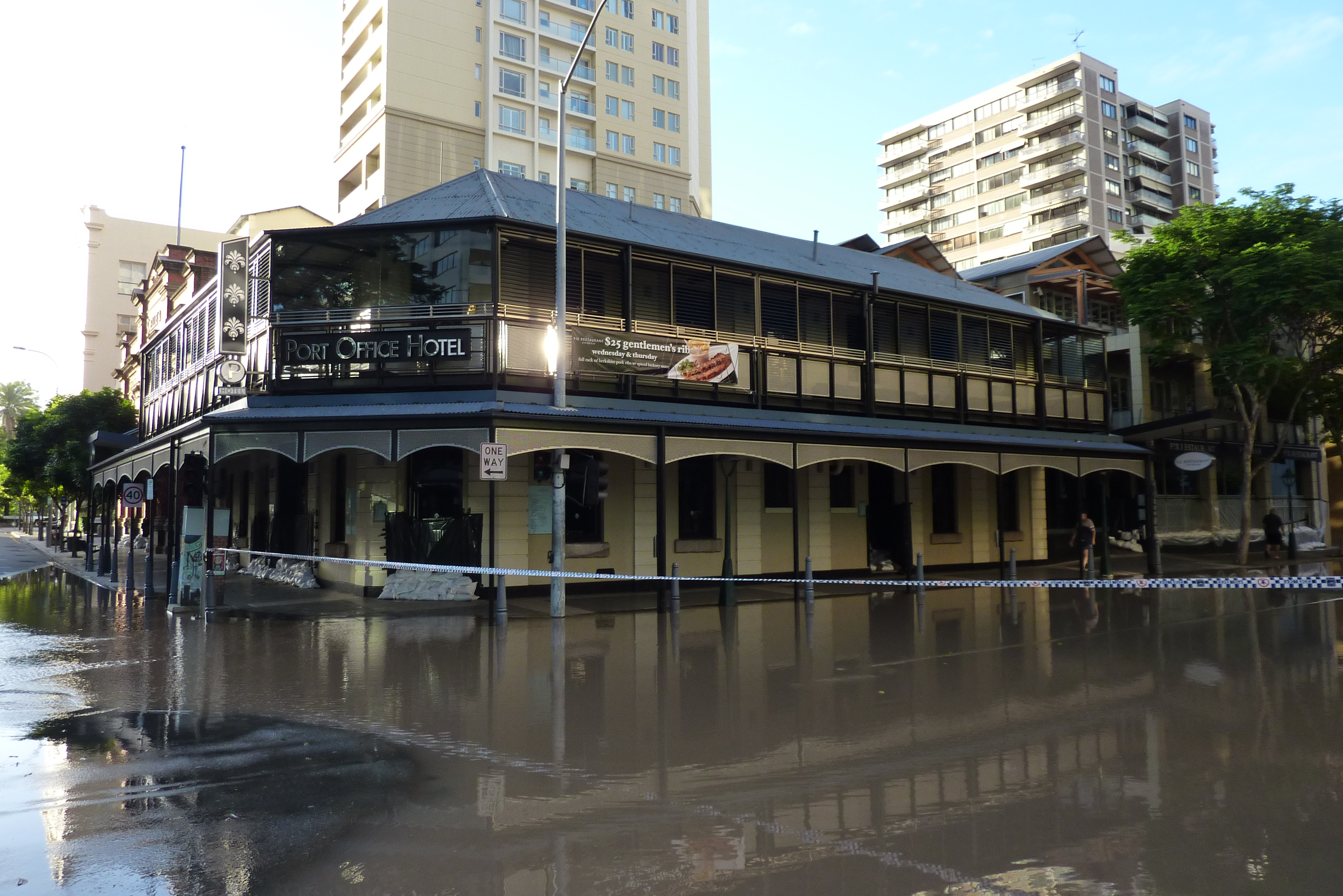
Flooded Edward and Margaret Streets looking towards the Port Office Hotel, 2011

Due to its low-lying position, the Port Office Hotel was sandbagged to provide protection during the 2011 Brisbane floods.

== Description ==
The Port Office Hotel, located on the corner of Edward and Margaret Streets, is a two storeyed rendered brick building with a corrugated iron roof. The rendered brickwork is scribed to imitate stonework and has bays separated by rendered quoins while a number of the window openings have stone sills. A cantilevered awning dominates the street facades.

A separate store with a hipped roof, filling in the "L" shape plan to create a rectangle, has been incorporated into the structure. A verandah has been added to the eastern back wall. Leadlight windows remain in some of the ground floor openings.

Internally some of the early timber doors, architraves, and skirtings survive but otherwise the majority including the stair has been altered in various refurbishments since the 1950s.

== Heritage listing ==
Port Office Hotel was listed on the Queensland Heritage Register on 21 October 1992 having satisfied the following criteria.

The place is important in demonstrating the evolution or pattern of Queensland's history.

The Port Office Hotel is significant for its contribution to the lower Edward Street streetscape in association with the Port Office, Naval Offices, Old Mineral House and Smellie's Building.

The place is important because of its aesthetic significance.

The Port Office Hotel is significant for its contribution to the lower Edward Street streetscape in association with the Port Office, Naval Offices, Old Mineral House and Smellie's Building.
