= Lewis Jarvis Harvey =

Craftsman and teacher (1871–1949)

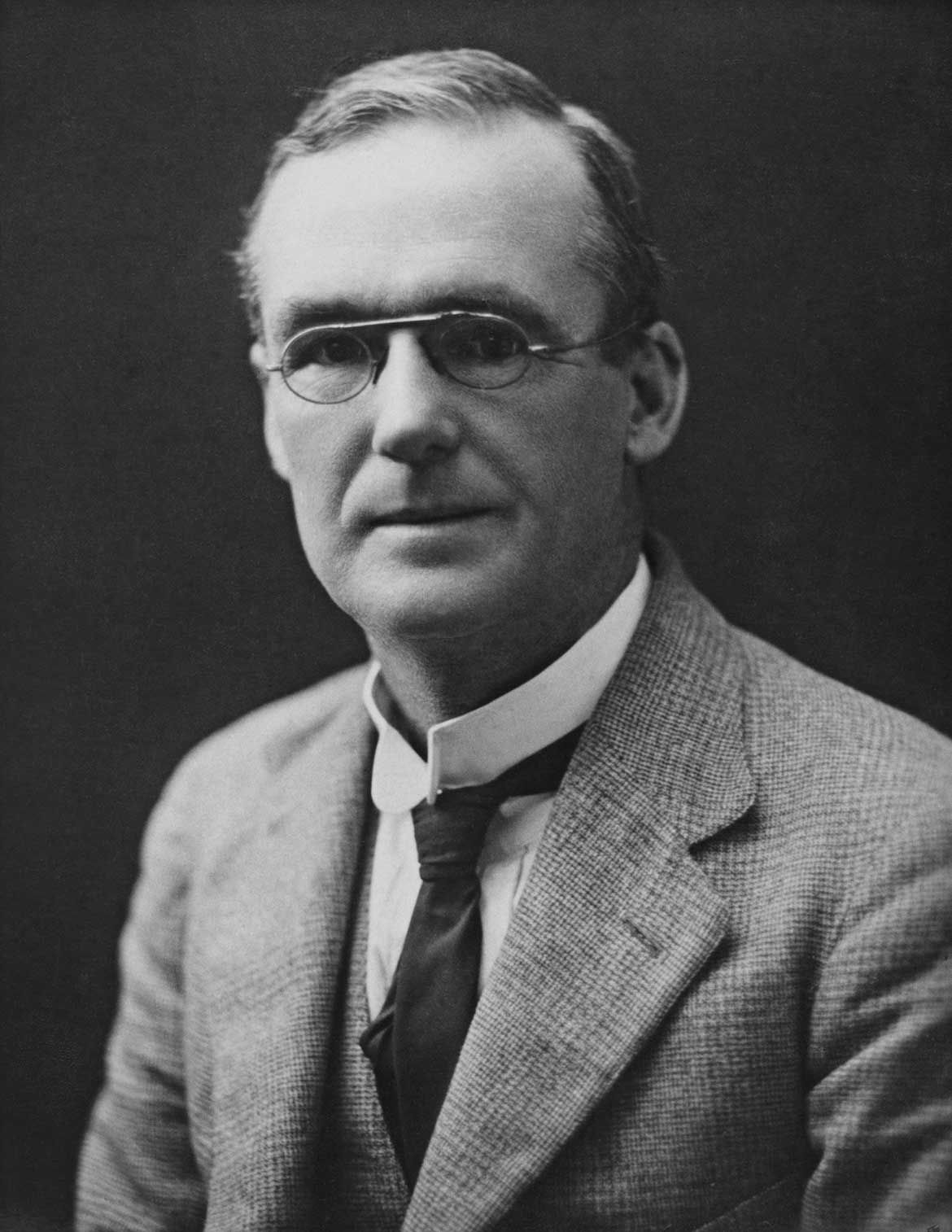
- Born: 16 June 1871
- Died: 1949

Lewis Jarvis Harvey (1871–1949) was an artist and teacher in Brisbane, Queensland, Australia. He was an important practitioner and teacher in the arts and crafts movement in Queensland and a figure of national significance. He was an accomplished artist, carver, ceramist and sculptor, as well as the inspiration of the largest school of Art Pottery in Australia. His work appears in many churches and public buildings.

== Early life ==
Lewis Jarvis Harvey was born at Wantage, in Berkshire, England on 16 June 1871, the second son of the six children born to Enos James Harvey (an iron moulder and engineer) and his wife Elizabeth (née Jarvis). His family came to Brisbane in 1874, and he attended the Kangaroo Point State School and began his work life as a telegraph messenger.

== Artistic career ==
Harvey studied art at the Brisbane Technical College, from about 1887 under the direction of Joseph Augustine Clarke.

He had a fondness for Renaissance Classical revival traditions which sometimes resulted in over-decorated formal pieces. Harvey excelled as a woodcarver and had wide local impact on furniture design and manufacture. In 1888–90 he won first and special prizes for carved wood panels in competitions restricted to apprentices.

In 1915, he designed a new system for teaching pottery. He experimented with glazes and used local clays to fashion the pots he created and decorated them using Australian motifs.

He was the applied arts teacher of modelling, woodcarving and pottery at the Brisbane Technical College from August 1916 to December 1937. He taught artists such as Daphne Mayo, William Leslie Bowles, Lloyd Rees, Daisy Nosworthy and Florence Bland. The College exhibited the students work at the 1924 British Empire Exhibition at Wembley, London.

In 1938, Harvey opened an applied art school at Horsham House, Adelaide Street, Brisbane and taught a wide range of people and was associated with the most significant Queensland artists of his day.

He served on the art advisory committee of the Queensland Art Gallery from 1938 to 1945.

In 1940, he was a foundation member of the Half Dozen Group of Artists.

Harvey died in Brisbane on 19 July 1949. He was attending a Royal Queensland Art Society meeting at the Lyceum Club where he suddenly collapsed and died. He had been an active committee member of the Society since 1920 and was made a Life Member in 1937.

His funeral was held on 21 July 1949 at St Mary's Anglican Church, Kangaroo Point followed by a cremation at the Mount Thompson Crematorium.

== Legacy ==
The State Library of Queensland holds material about Harvey's work such as: L. J. Harvey and his Times, L. J. Harvey and his School, as well as ephemeral material which includes articles, biographical information and exhibition catalogues.
