= Riverlife Adventure Centre =

Riverlife
- Founder: John Sharpe
- Headquarters: Naval Stores Lower River Terrace, Kangaroo Point, Brisbane, QLD 4169 Australia
- Website: http://www.riverlife.com.au/

Housed in Brisbane's heritage listed Naval Stores, Riverlife is an adventure centre on the Kangaroo Point of Brisbane in Queensland, Australia providing leisure activities. It can be found via Lower River Terrance and is known for its guided kayaking tours, rock climbing instruction, and abseiling. It also offers equipment hire for, such as kayaks, mountain bikes, kick scooters and rollerblades.

== History ==
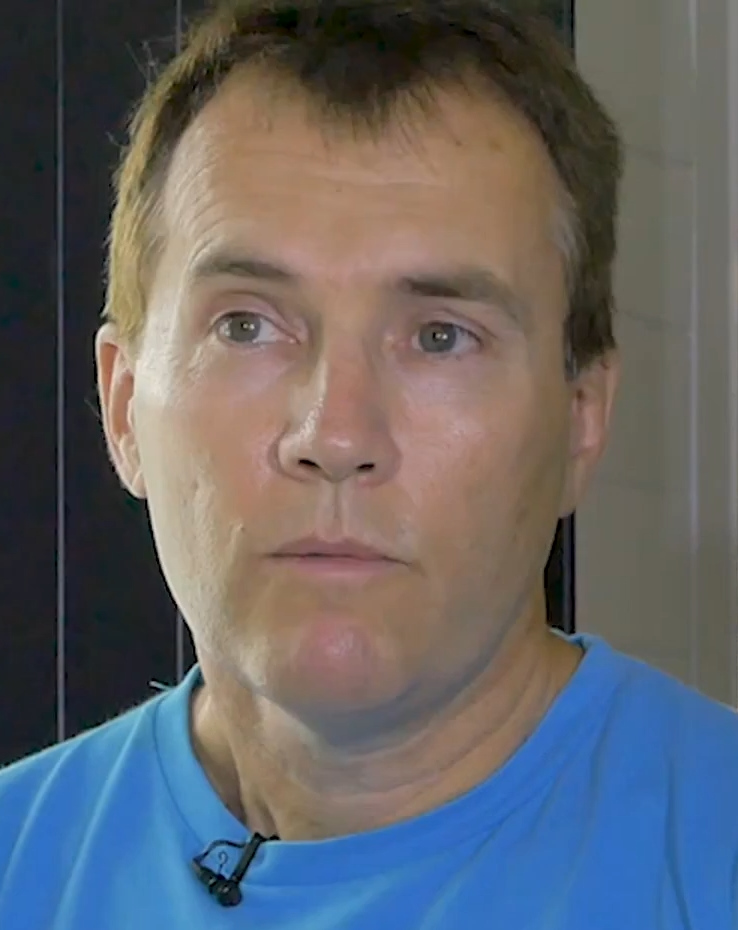
Founder and owner of Riverlife John Sharpe

The term Riverlife was coined in December 2003. After 18 months of market research, project development and public consultation, Riverlife was launched on 5 April 2005, from the heritage-listed, Kangaroo Point Naval Stores. The building is one of two constructed in 1886 -1888 as a depot for the Queensland Marine Defence Force. The other Naval Stores building burned down in 1987.

The distinctive pink and green stone of the Kangaroo Point Cliffs was quarried from the imposing cliffs from the early days of the Moreton Bay penal colony until 1976, of which evidence can be seen on the cliff face and the stone itself, which is known as Brisbane tuff. This stone can also be seen on many of Brisbane buildings.

The January 2011 Queensland floods caused a damage bill for Riverlife of over $100,000.

In 2012, Riverlife was rated in the Top 4 of Brisbane's Attractions and Things To Do. Additionally, it is nominated as one of Queensland's Must-Do experiences.

== Aboriginal culture ==
Aboriginal people settled the area at least 22,000 years before the arrival of Europeans in 1823. The river supplied fish and shellfish and the stringy bark trees growing along the river were used to build canoes. The dreamtime story of ‘The Rainbow Serpent' tells of the creation of the cliff area along the river bank at Kangaroo Point. Various Aboriginal groups shared this story and owned parts of it.

In 2005, Riverlife Mirrabooka was created as a joint venture between Riverlife and the Nunukul Yuggera Dance Troupe. It began operating in Brisbane and on Moreton Island, exhibiting rich Australian Aborigines cultural heritage of both regions. It performs 'Welcome to Country' ceremonies and plays traditional musical instrument didgeridoos. It is a member of Aboriginal Tourism Australia and is completing the Respecting Our Culture (ROC) Tourism Business Development Program.

== Tangatours ==
In 2008, Riverlife established Tangatours in Moreton Bay - Moreton Island also known as Tangalooma. It invested in and purchased segways for guided tours along the beach.

== See also ==
- Tangalooma
