= William Maitland Woods =

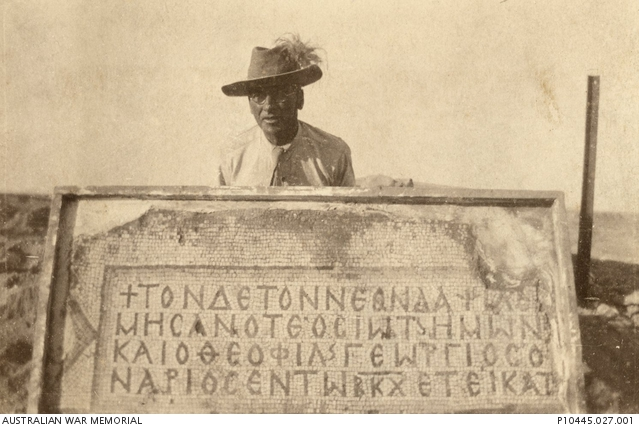
William Maitland Woods with the inscription from the Shellal Mosaic, circa April 1917

William Maitland Woods (4 January 1864 – 6 February 1927) was an Anglican clergyman and a military chaplain in Queensland, Australia.

== Early life ==
William Maitland Woods was born on 4 January 1864 in Mayfair, London, England, the son of Alfred Woods, master draper, and his wife Jane (née Damerel). He studied at the City of London School followed by St Mary Hall, Oxford University, where he graduated with a Bachelor of Arts in 1889.

== Religious life ==
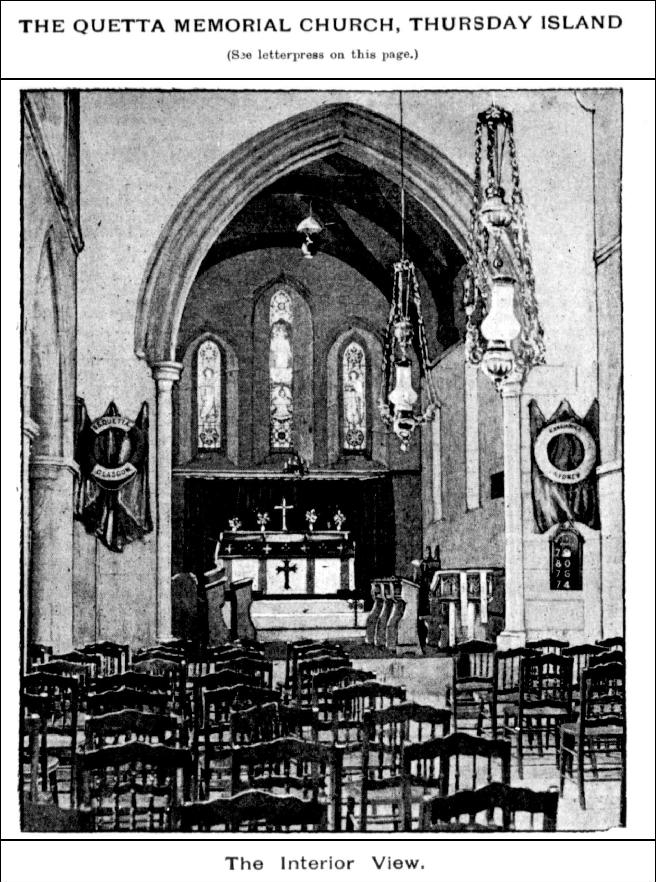
Interior of Quetta Memorial Church, Thursday Island, 1895

As the first rector of Thursday Island, Woods oversaw the building of the Quetta Memorial Church. He also worked in parishes in Townsville, Cairns, and Dalby. He was rector of St Mary's Anglican Church, Kangaroo Point from 1903 to 1913. He then served at Ariah Park in New South Wales from 1913 to 1915.

While he served as a chaplain in the Queensland Land Forces in 1893, Woods is largely remembered for his services as chaplain during World War I. He transferred to the Australian Imperial Force in August 1915 and served at Gallipoli with the 2nd Brigade, then the 7th Light Horse Regiment. After evacuation to Egypt, Woods was appointed to the staff of Major General Harry Chauvel's ANZAC Mounted Division in July 1916, as Senior Chaplain. Despite his advancing age, he spent long months camped in the desert with the troops, as the campaign in defence of the Suez Canal unfolded, and the Sinai Peninsula and Palestine were retaken. Woods was remembered with affection by the men to whom he ministered as being compassionate, energetic and sure of his purpose.

== Correspondence with Canon David Garland ==
During his war service, Woods corresponded with fellow Anglican priest David John Garland in Brisbane. Woods wrote from various locations: Gallipoli, Lemnos, Cairo, Ma'adi, Port Said, and other Australian Light Horse camp sites in Egypt, Palestine and on the Sinai Peninsula around the Suez Canal. In the letters he described daily life and conditions in the trenches, the dust, heat and illness, and often expressed admiration for the immense bravery, physical strength and unflappably positive attitude of the Australian soldiers in his care. Many of his letters remarked on his everyday duties as chaplain, as he held services, ministered to the men and performed the unhappy task of burying the fallen. He also described the harshness and the beauty of the desert landscape, and the quiet progress of the long columns of troops as they wound through the sand seeking water or encampment.

Several of the letters from 1915 and 1916 discussed a flag from Gallipoli – the first Australian flag hoisted on the Gallipoli Peninsula after the landing, carried and hoisted by Queenslanders, and given to Woods with the wish that it "be sent to His Grace the Archbishop of Brisbane to be hung in the Cathedral Church of St John". Woods posted the flag to Garland for safekeeping. In November 1918, the Cathedral authorities clarified that the flag was not an official standard but rather taken to Gallipoli as the personal property of some Queensland soldiers.

Both men exchanged news of their families, in particular their sons, who were on active service. Wood's son, Francis Maitland Woods ("Young Mait") served much of the war alongside his father.

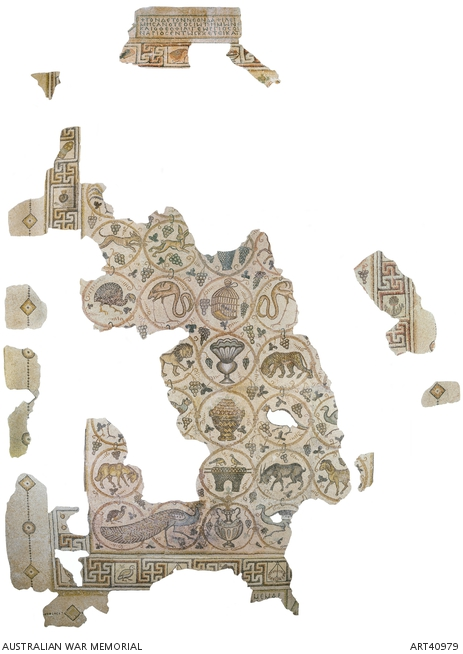
Shellal Mosaic at the Australian War Museum

As an enthusiastic amateur archaeologist, Woods also wrote to Garland about objects which he and the men found – coins, relics, and most significantly, the Shellal Mosaic. Discovered by troops on 17 April 1917 during the Second Battle of Gaza, this mosaic was eventually shipped to Australia bound for the Australian War Memorial, and Woods was responsible for overseeing its excavation and transportation. In one letter, dated 27 June 1917, he described the "fearful heat" of the excavation, and the "trials and difficulties of getting it so far from Palestine" including negotiation with the Cairo Museum authorities. In other letters he commented on the various ruins and archaeological sites he saw in his travels. In keeping with his religious and historical interests, he often gave informal lectures to the troops about different aspects of the Holy Land, and reported the success of these small ventures to Garland. Because censorship often prevented Woods from revealing his precise location in his letters, he sometimes alluded to his whereabouts by drawing on his knowledge of antiquity, or using biblical references.

The wartime letters ceased in August 1917, with Garland's news that he would be joining Woods in the Middle East.

== Later life ==
In 1919, Woods was appointed OBE. and returned to Australia. He immediately sailed to join his wife in Fiji where she had nursed during the war, then onto Hawaii, where Woods became the Headmaster of Iolani College for a year, then rector of St Clement's Episcopal Church from 1923.

Woods died on 6 February 1927 in Queen's Hospital, Honolulu, Hawaii, United States of America from a cerebral tumour. He was survived by his wife, son and daughter.

== Legacy ==
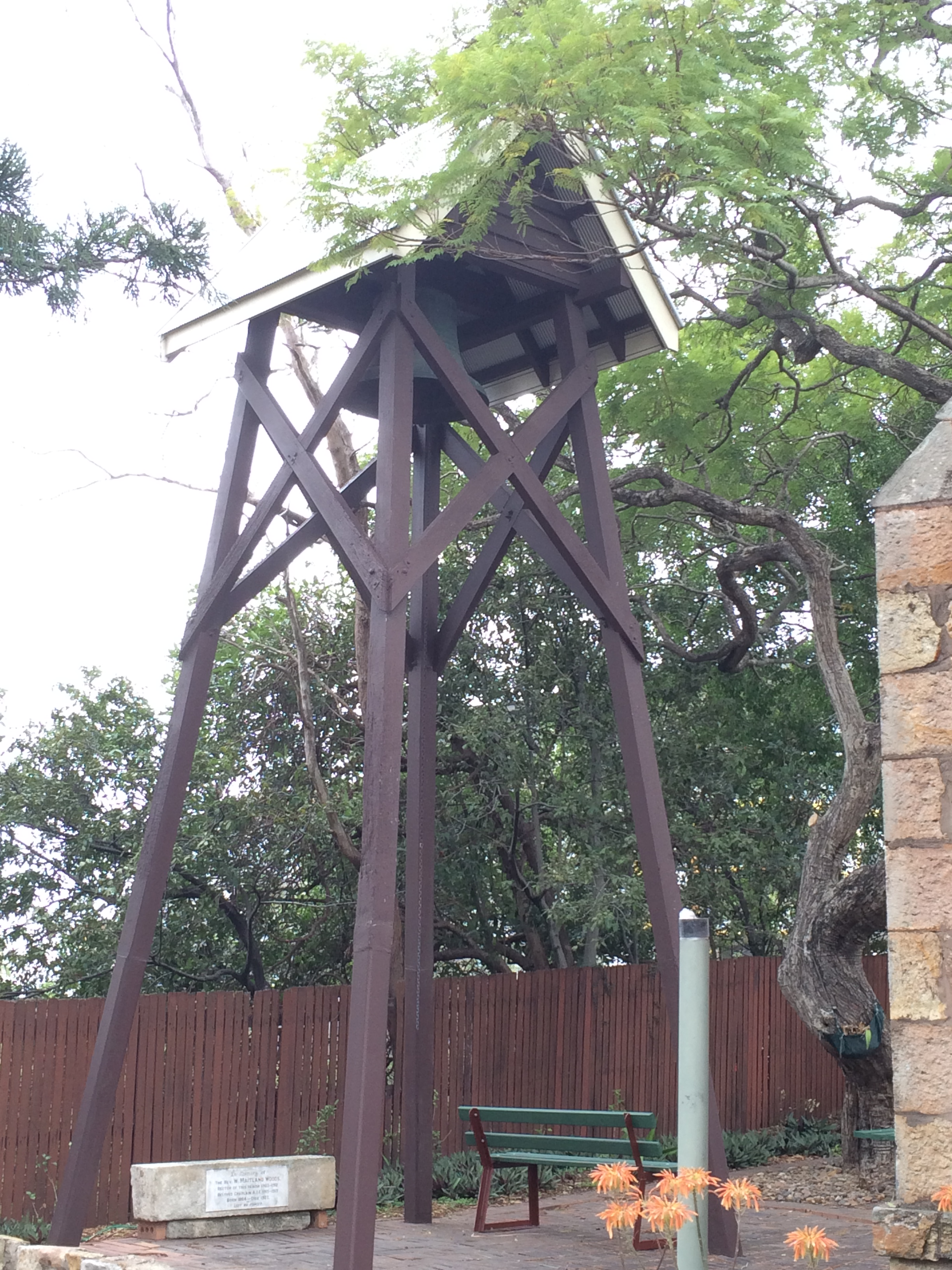
Belltower at St Mary's Anglican Church, Kangaroo Point, 2016

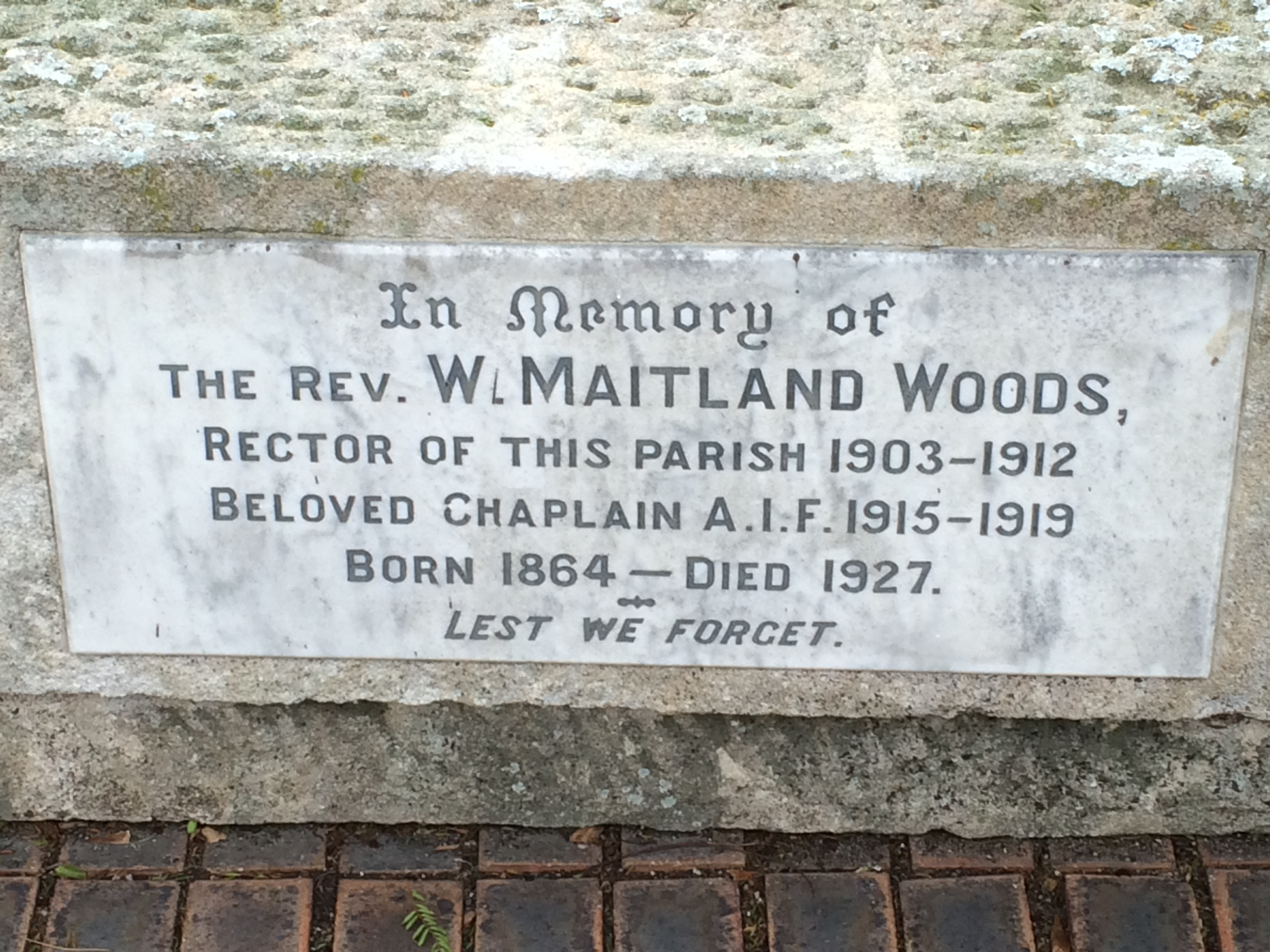
Memorial at St Mary's Anglican Church, Kangaroo Point, 2016

Following Wood's death in 1926, a bell tower was erected to his memory at St Mary's Anglican Church, Kangaroo Point. The belltower is dedicated to Woods on a plaque and by inscriptions engraved on the bells.

The State Library of Queensland holds the Maitland Woods Papers, which contain around 65 letters between Woods and Garland. The last letter in the collection is from Woods to Garland, dated 19 May 1926.

== See also ==
- George Washington Thomas Lambert
