= St Mary's Anglican Church, Kangaroo Point =

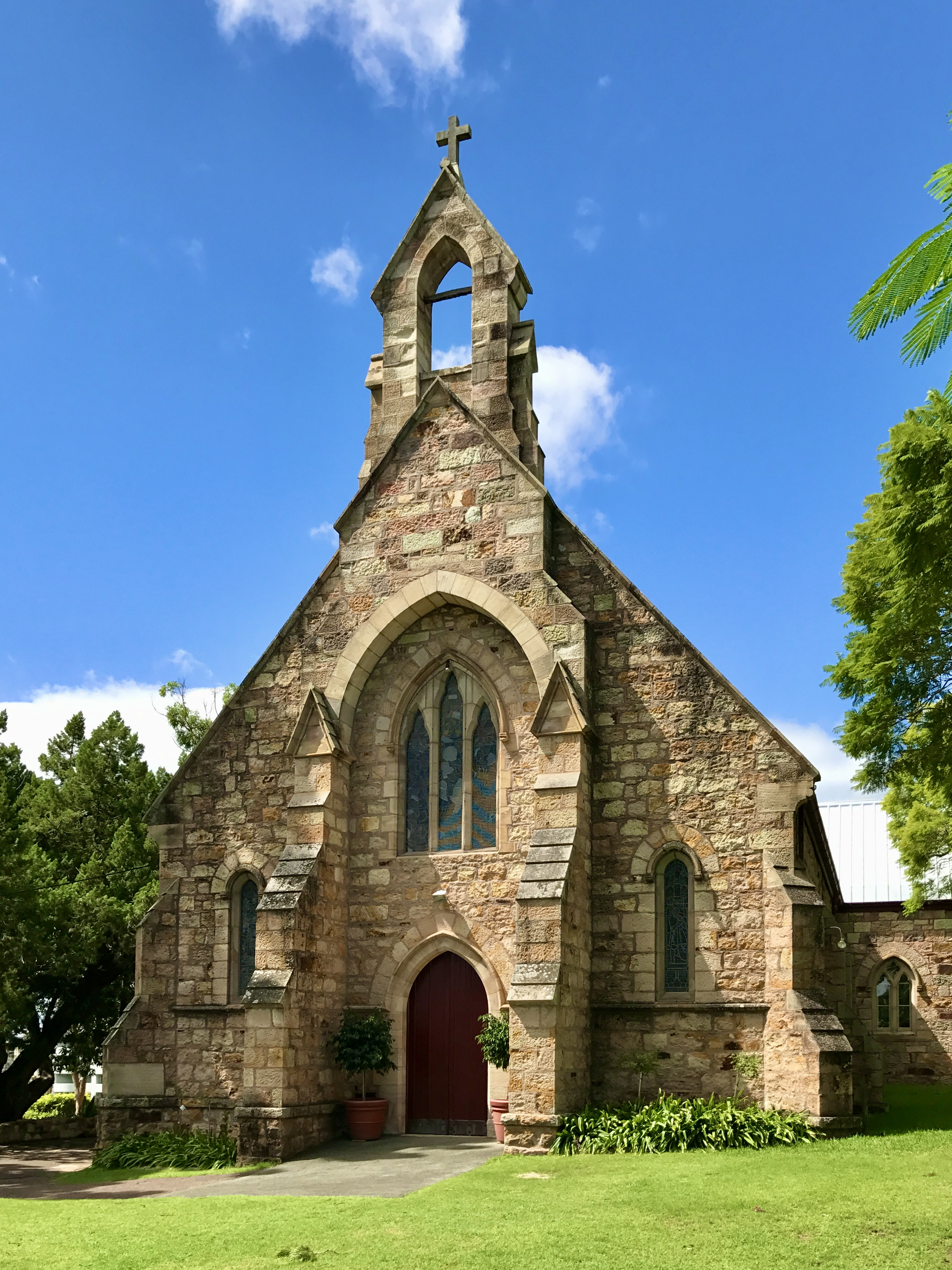
- St Mary's Anglican Church, West Front, 2017

- Location within Queensland Location within Australia
- 27.4747°S 153.0351°E
- Location: 455 Main Street, Kangaroo Point, Queensland, Australia

History
- Design period: 1870s–1890s (late 19th century)
- Built: 1873

Site notes
- Architect: Richard George Suter
- Architectural style: Gothic Revival

Queensland Heritage Register
- Official name: St Marys Anglican Church
- Type: state heritage (built)
- Designated: 21 October 1992
- Reference no.: 600244
- Significant period: 1873, 1879, 1889, 1892–93, 1901, 1931 (fabric)
- Significant components: stained glass window/s, gate – entrance, church, trees/plantings, furniture/fittings, hall, wall/s, memorial/monument, residential accommodation – rectory, pipe organ, tower – bell / belfry
- Builders: Alfred Grant

St Mary's Anglican Church is a heritage-listed churchyard at 433, 447 & 449 Main Street, Kangaroo Point, Queensland, Australia. It was designed by Richard George Suter and built in 1873 by Alfred Grant. It was added to the Queensland Heritage Register on 21 October 1992.

== History ==
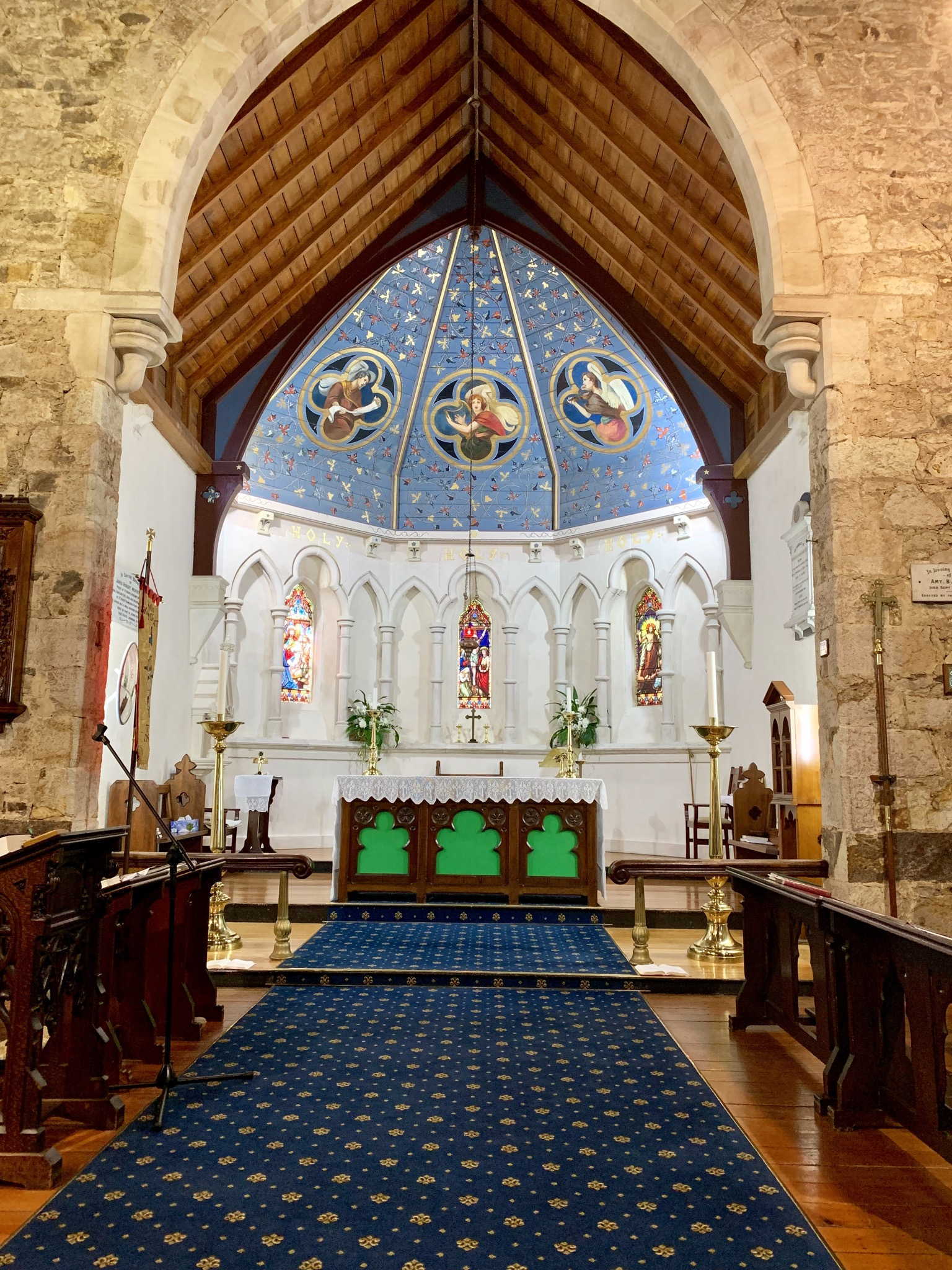
The Chancel and Rectors chairs in front of Altar, Saint Mary's Anglican Church

The Church of St Mary's, Kangaroo Point was built in 1873 by Alfred Grant to a design by diocesan architect Richard G Suter. It replaced a timber structure built in 1849 on land closer to the river.

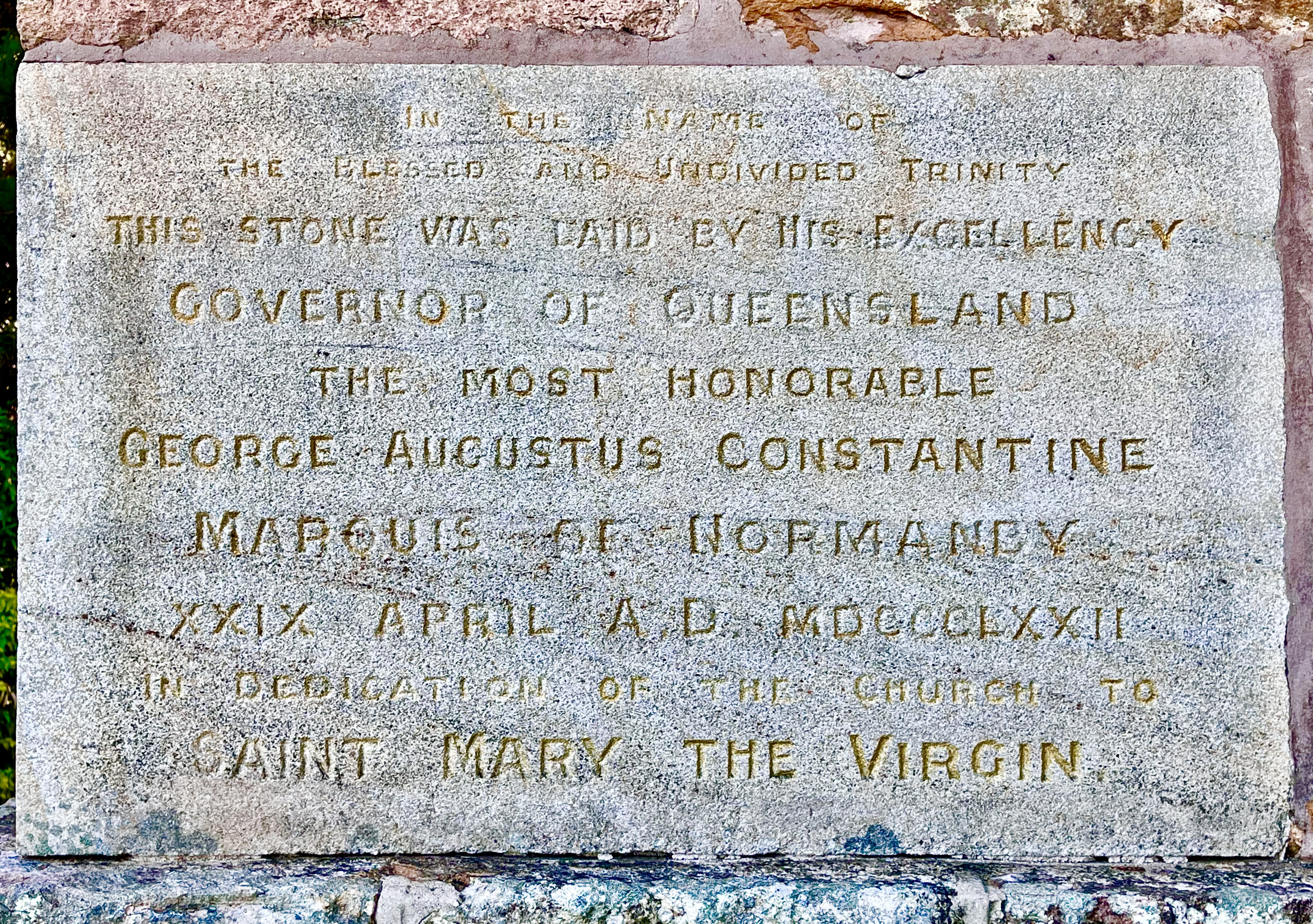
Corner stone laid 29 April 1872

The cornerstone of the present church was laid on 30 April 1872 by the Queensland Governor George Phipps, 2nd Marquess of Normanby in the presence of the Anglican Bishop of Brisbane Edward Tufnell. The stone contains a time capsule containing a bottle with a parchment signed by the Governor, the Bishop and other church dignitaries, a copy of the plans of the church, a copy of the Brisbane Courier and some coins of the realm.

The church was officially opened and dedicated to St Mary the Virgin on Wednesday 5 November 1873 by Bishop Tufnell.

The Sunday School building was opened on 30 November 1879 by Bishop Matthew Hale.

In 1892 a cyclone caused considerable damage to the church's roof and bellcote. Stone structures on the northern external aspect of the chancel indicate that the building is incomplete and a vestry or bell tower may have been intended for that site.

The pipe organ is the oldest in Queensland, dating from the early nineteenth century. It was imported from a London church in 1876. It was built by H.C. Lincoln (1789–1864). and further stops were added in the 1961 by the Brisbane firm Whitehouse & Brothers. It is now maintained by Pierce Pipe Organs and plans are afoot for its complete restoration at some future date.

The church hall was built in 1879. The rectory, designed by diocesan architect John Hingeston Buckeridge, was completed in 1889.

St Mary's was patronised by the governors when they resided at Old Government House. It has always been the naval chapel in Queensland and was once connected by stairs with the Naval Stores below the quarry face.

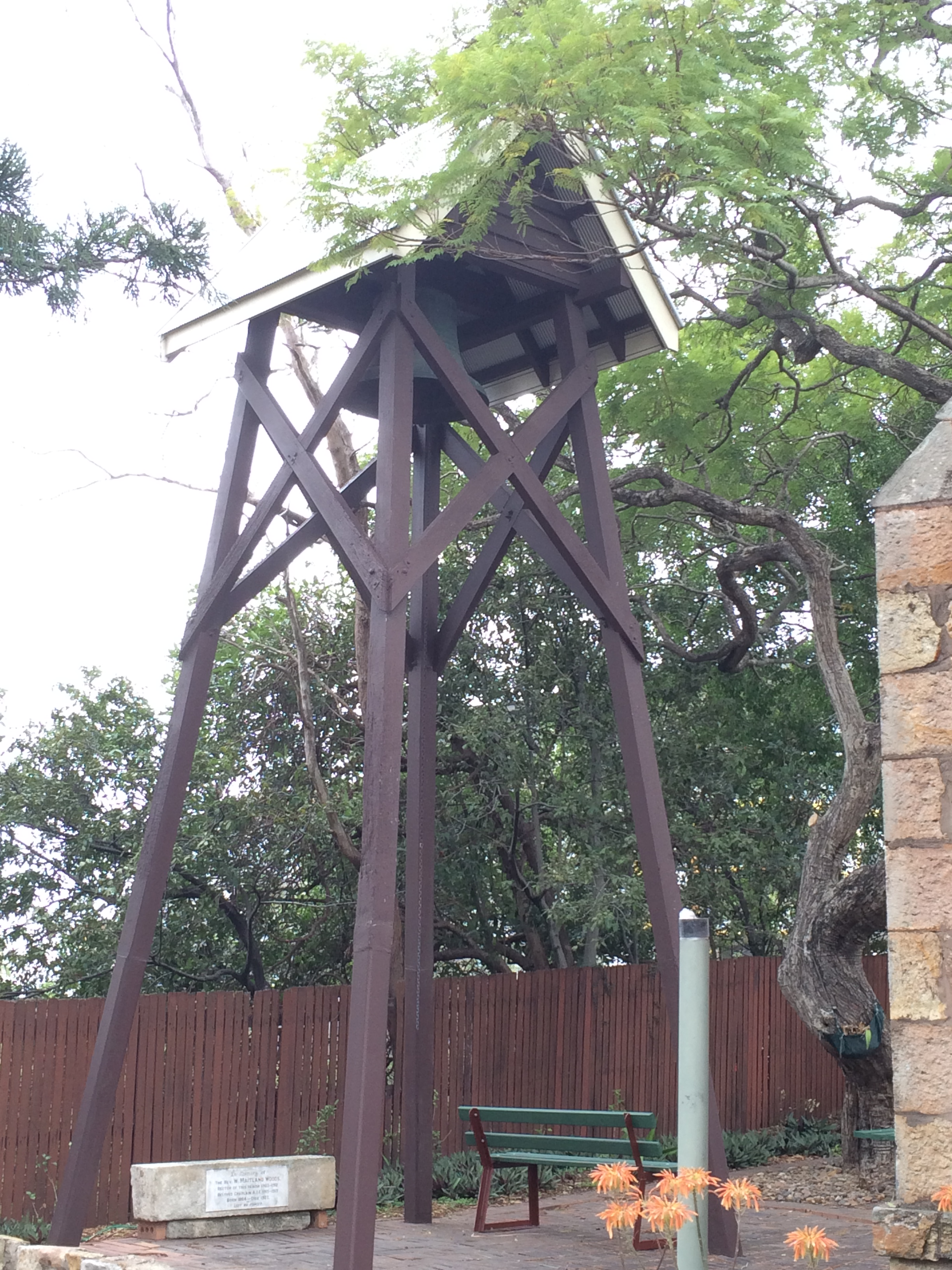
Memorial belltower for Rev. Maitland Woods, 2016

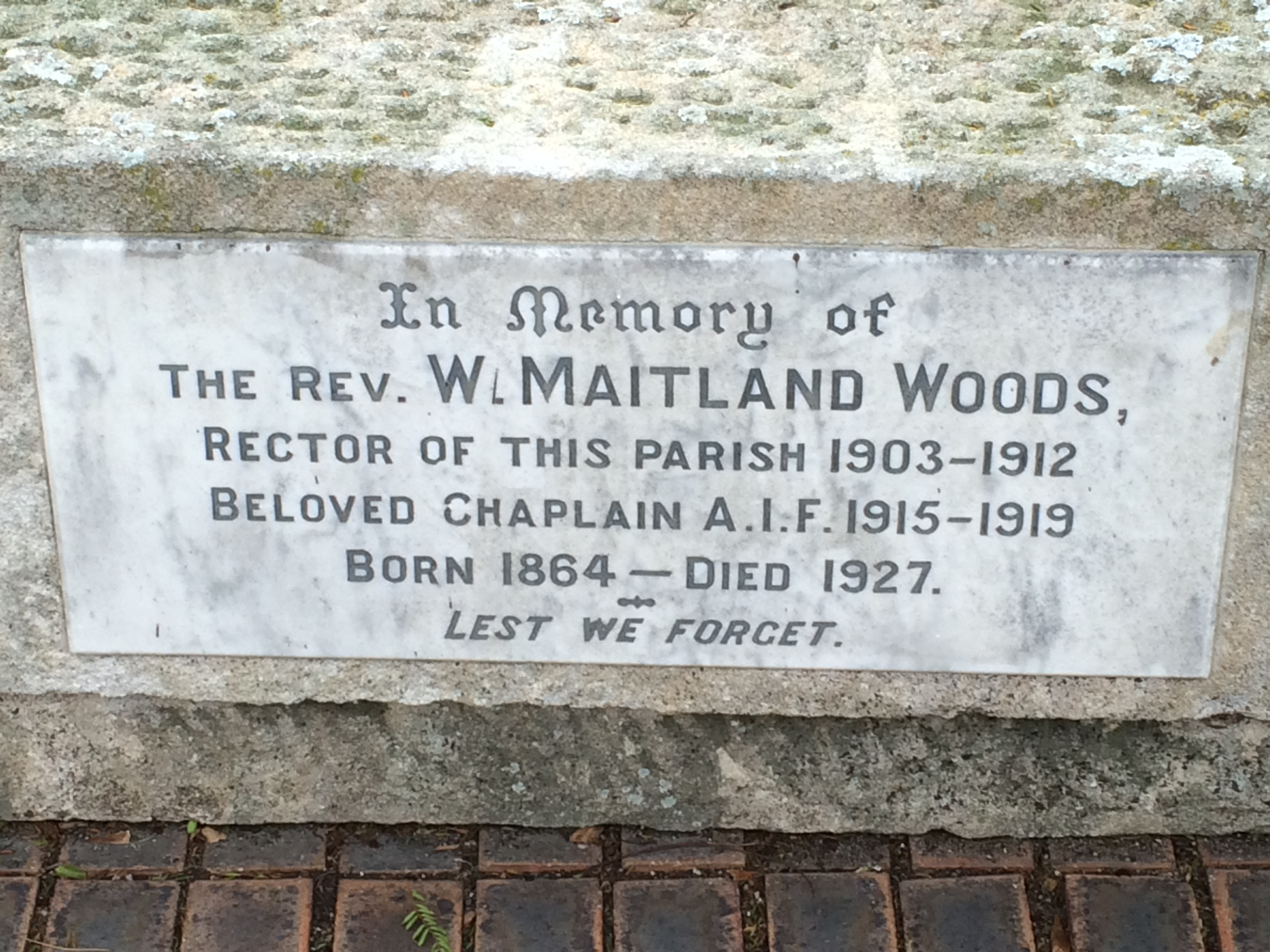
Memorial stone to Rev. Maitland Woods, 2016

Following the death in 1926 of former rector and World War I army chaplain, the Reverend William Maitland Woods, a bell tower (separate to the church building) was erected to his memory. The belltower is dedicated to Woods on a plaque and by inscriptions engraved on the bells.

The Warriors' Chapel, dedicated in 1950, contains a memorial to those who died on HMAS Voyager in 1964. There are also a number of naval commemorative plaques and monuments in the church gardens.

== Description ==
St Mary's is a Gothic style church built on a prominent riverside site above the Kangaroo Point quarries. Constructed of Brisbane tuff, it is cruciform in shape, but with shallow transepts and a faceted sanctuary bay. The gable roof, originally timber shingled, is now in ribbed galvanized iron. It is surmounted by a small stone bellcote at the front gable.

In the interior, the nave is unlined, and timber trusses, resting on small masonry pillars, support the roof. The sanctuary is lined with plaster and its ceiling features three paintings by the noted artist R. Godfrey Rivers.

The hall is a timber structure on concrete stumps. Cruciform in shape with a proscenium stage, it has a gabled corrugated iron roof surmounted by a central ventilation lantern.

The rectory is a large single-storey brick residence with verandahs on three sides. It stands on brick piers with honeycomb infill. Entry is through a gabled frontispiece. The verandah has timber posts and balusters. A number of bays on the rear verandah add to the complexity of the corrugated roof which is a series of hips and gables.

== St Mary's Studio ==
Located in the hall basement, St Mary's Studio was host to many artists, art classes, and arts groups from 1950 until 2010, and played a significant role in the development of the cultural landscape in Brisbane. Artists such as Betty Churcher, Roy Churcher, Margaret Cilento, Jon Molvig, and Mervin Moriarty taught classes at the Studio. The Half Dozen Group of Artists used the space as a studio from 1975. The group is now located in Sherwood.

== Heritage listing ==
St Mary's Anglican Church was listed on the Queensland Heritage Register on 21 October 1992 having satisfied the following criteria:

The place is important in demonstrating the evolution or pattern of Queensland's history.

St Mary's Anglican Church is significant as having always been the naval chapel in Queensland.

St Mary's Anglican Church contains the oldest pipe organ in Queensland and the religious art of Godfrey Rivers.

The place demonstrates rare, uncommon or endangered aspects of Queensland's cultural heritage.

St Mary's Anglican Church is an early and intact religious precinct of church, hall and rectory and is one of the only two surviving stone churches designed by RG Suter.

The place is important in demonstrating the principal characteristics of a particular class of cultural places.

St Marys Anglican Church is an early and intact religious precinct of church, hall and rectory and is one of the only two surviving stone churches designed by RG Suter.

The place is important because of its aesthetic significance.

The building remains as an historical and visual landmark in Kangaroo Point.

The place has a strong or special association with a particular community or cultural group for social, cultural or spiritual reasons.

St Mary's Anglican Church is significant as having always been the naval chapel in Queensland.

The place has a special association with the life or work of a particular person, group or organisation of importance in Queensland's history.

St Mary's Anglican Church is an early and intact religious precinct of church, hall and rectory and is one of the only two surviving stone churches designed by RG Suter.
