= List of ships of the Queensland Maritime Defence Force =

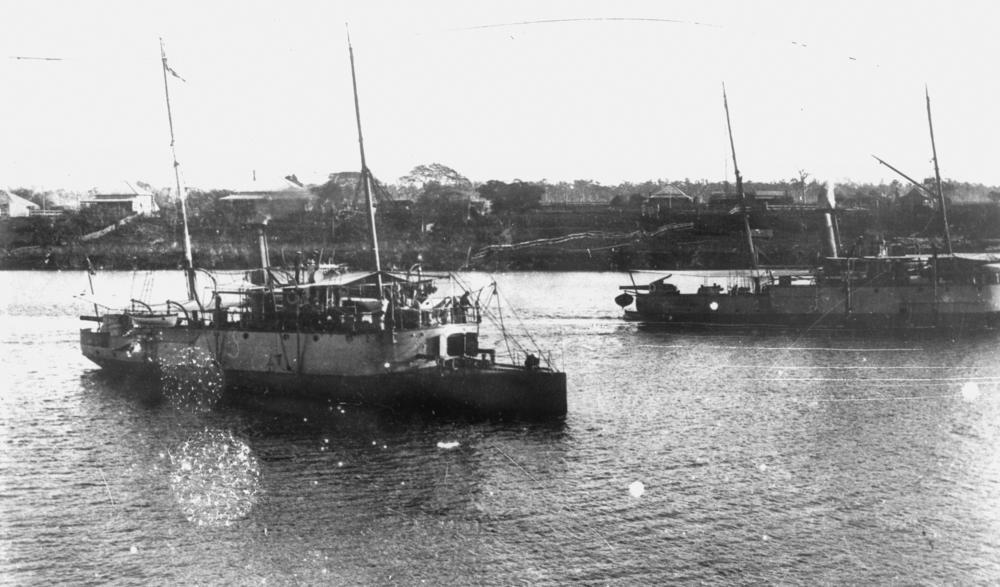
Two gunboats on the river at Bundaberg, Queensland, ca. 1898. Paluma in the foreground and Gayundah on the right.

In 1884, following the recommendations of the Jervois-Scratchley reports, the Queensland Marine Defence Force was established. To equip the new force, the Queensland colonial government purchased two gunboats and a torpedo boat. Queensland bought eight more vessels to create the second largest fleet in the Australian colonies behind Victoria. With the federation of the Australian colonies, those vessels still in service joined the Commonwealth Naval Forces in 1901 and the Royal Australian Navy when it was formed in 1911. No ship ever met the enemy in battle or fell victim to enemy action; most had long, albeit in some cases humble, careers in both naval and private hands past World War II.

== B ==
Name	Type	Class	Dates	Displacement	Armament	Notes	References
Bonito	Auxiliary gunboat	–	1884–unknown	450 tons	1 × 64-pdr gun	–	
Bream	Auxiliary gunboat	–	1884–unknown	450 tons	1 × 5-inch gun	Dive wreck Tangalooma	

== D ==
Name	Type	Class	Dates	Displacement	Armament	Notes	References
Dolphin	Auxiliary gunboat	–	1884–unknown	450 tons	1 × 5-inch gun	Dive wreck Tangalooma	

== G ==
Name	Type	Class	Dates	Displacement	Armament	Speed	Notes	References
Gayundah	Gunboat	Gayundah class	1884–1918	360 tons	1 × 8-inch gun; 1 × 6-inch gun; 2 × 1.5-inch gun; 2 × machine guns	10.5 knots	Breakwater Woody Point	

== M ==
Name	Type	Class	Dates	Displacement	Armament	Speed	Notes	References
Midge	Torpedo launch	–	1887–1912	–	1 × 3-pdr gun; 2 × machine-guns; two x 14-inch torpedo dropping gear	–	–	
Miner	Mining tender	–	1887–1901	65 tons	–	8 knots	Breakwater Bishop Island	
Mosquito	Torpedo boat	–	1884–1910	–	–	–	First warship in Queensland service; served in the RAN between 1901 and 1910.	

== O ==
Name	Type	Class	Dates	Displacement	Armament	Speed	Notes	References
Otter	Patrol vessel	–	1887–1906	220 tons	1 × 5-inch gun (replaced later with 1 × 64-pdr gun)	–	Requisitioned by RAN in World War I and World War II.	

== P ==
Name	Type	Class	Dates	Displacement	Armament	Speed	Notes	References
Paluma	Gunboat	Gayundah class	1884–1916	360 tons	1 × 8-inch gun; 1 × 6-inch gun; 2 × 1.5-inch gun; 2 × machine-guns	10.5 knots	–	
Pumba	Auxiliary gunboat	–	1884–1901	450 tons	1 × 5-inch guns	–	Rebuilt in 1958 and renamed Enterprise, served as a civilian cargo vessel into the 1970s.	

== S ==
Name	Type	Class	Dates	Displacement	Armament	Speed	Notes	References
Stingaree	Auxiliary gunboat	–	1984–1895	450 tons	1 × 5-inch gun	–	Dive wreck Tangalooma	

== Vessels in chronological order by class ==
=== Torpedo boat ===
- Mosquito

=== Gayundah-class gunboats ===
- Gayundah
- Paluma

=== Patrol vessel ===
- Otter

=== Auxiliary gunboats ===
- Bonito
- Bream
- Dolphin
- Pumba
- Stingaree

=== Torpedo launch ===
- Midge

=== Mining tender ===
- Miner

== See also ==
- List of Royal Australian Navy ships
