= Naval Stores, Kangaroo Point =

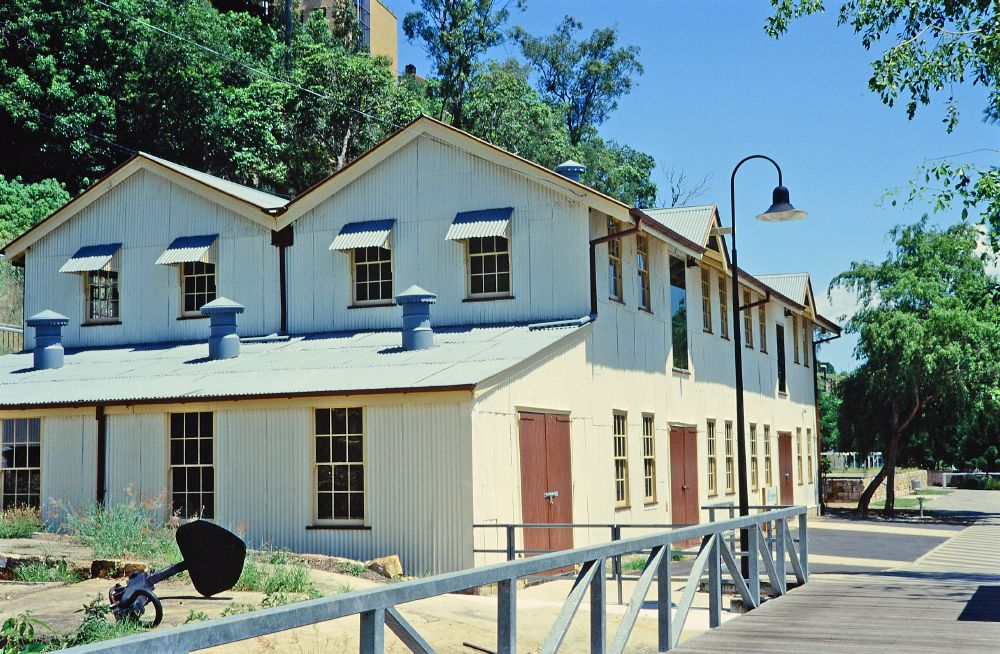
- Naval Stores, Kangaroo Point

- Location within Queensland Location within Australia
- 27.4743°S 153.0345°E
- Location: 34 Amesbury Street, Kangaroo Point, Queensland, Australia

History
- Design period: 1870s–1890s (late 19th century)
- Built: 1886–1900s

Queensland Heritage Register
- Official name: Naval Stores (former), Naval Brigade Stores, Naval Depot
- Type: state heritage (archaeological, built)
- Designated: 21 October 1992
- Reference no.: 600239
- Significant period: 1880s–1900s (fabric); 1880s–1950s (historical)
- Significant components: slab/s – concrete, store/s / storeroom / storehouse, hut/shack, toilet block/earth closet/water closet, turntable, changing rooms/dressing shed, magazine / explosives store, wharf/dock/quay, slipway, steps/stairway, paint/chemical store

Naval Stores is a heritage-listed storehouse at 34 Amesbury Street, Kangaroo Point, Queensland, Australia. It was built from 1886 to 1900s. It is also known as Naval Brigade Stores and Naval Depot. It was added to the Queensland Heritage Register on 21 October 1992.

Brisbane-based adventure company, Riverlife Adventure Centre, operates from the Naval Stores premises.

== History ==
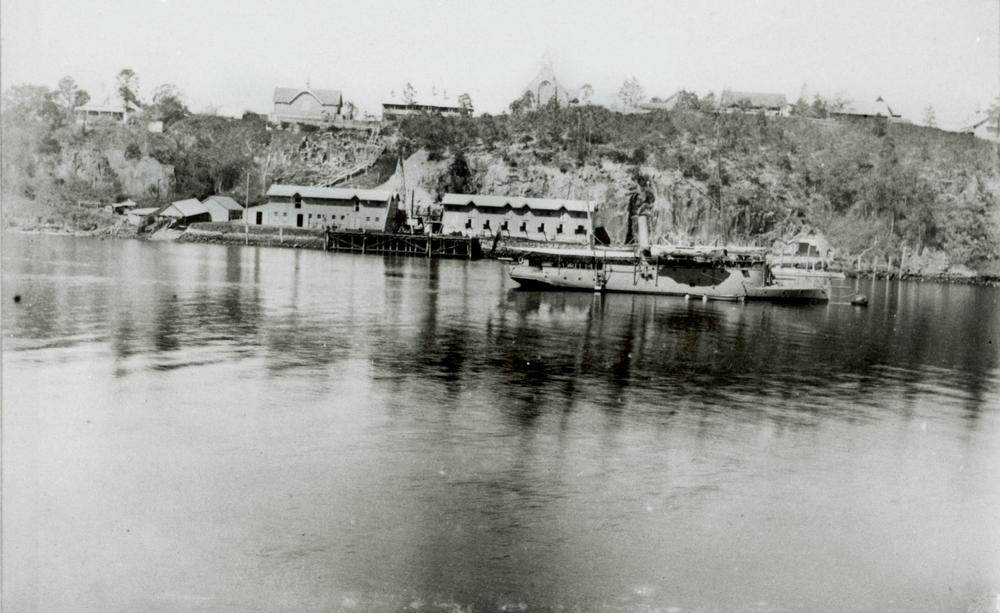
Naval stores, seen from the Brisbane River (historic)

The original Naval Stores comprised a pair of two-storeyed iron-clad stud-framed buildings and a wharf, which were constructed between 1886 and 1888. The complex has been used throughout its naval and army history for two main purposes, as a storage depot and for training.

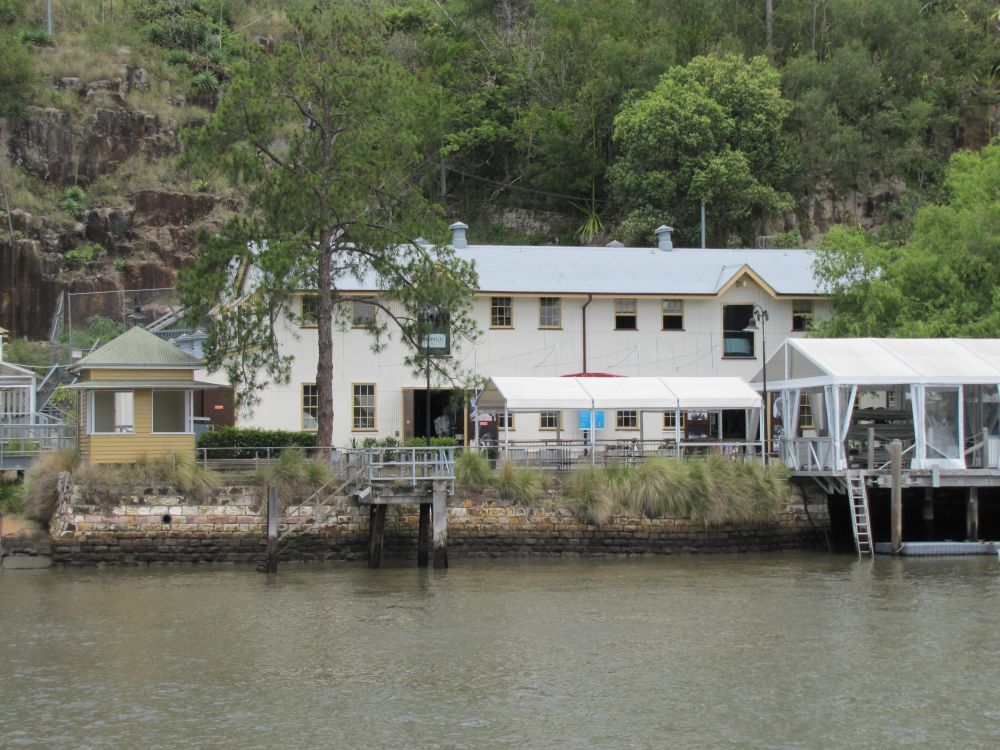
Naval stores, as seen from the Brisbane River, 2015

In 1884, at the height of the Russian war scare, the Queensland colonial government commissioned two gunboats, the Gayundah and Paluma. In 1885 the gunboats arrived and with the government's acquisition of other vessels the development of a naval depot for storage, repairs and training became necessary. The Naval Stores were built on the site of a former Kangaroo Point quarry (now known as the Kangaroo Point Cliffs).

The ground floor of Store No 1 contained the battery and lecture rooms used for training. The four rooms upstairs were used for stores and carpenters' shops. By 1913 upstairs was partitioned to provide for an orderly room, instructors' mess room and several small storerooms.

Store No 2 originally consisted of two large rooms on either floor, with workshops on the ground floor. The first floor storerooms included the torpedo store room.

After the 1893 floods, Store No 1 boat shed was replaced with a detached shed, a bridge linking the two stores was built, and an extension to the cliff stairs was added. About 1900 several additions to the site included the paint store, magazine, turntable between the stores and some first floor ceilings were lined.

The wooden stairs provide access up the cliff to Amesbury Street and St Mary's Anglican Church which has been the Naval Chapel for many years. The stairs have been extended over the years.

As the Queensland Naval Brigade developed, further depots were located at Maryborough, Rockhampton, Townsville, Cairns and Cooktown. Other colonies also developed their naval and military forces. The depot was the base of the Queensland Navy until the formation of the Royal Australian Navy after Federation.

Radio communication history was made in 1903 when the first Australian ship to use wireless telegraphy, the Gayundah, sent signals from Moreton Bay to the Stores. Alterations to the stores and additional structures were built during the occupation of the site by the Royal Australian Navy. The RAN Reserve vacated the site in 1959 and it was occupied by the Australian Army till 1984.

In 1984, two 8-inch (200 mm) breech-loading Armstrong forward guns from the Gayundah and Paluma were recovered. One gun and its mount have been lent to the Queensland Maritime Museum Association.

The flagpoles, semaphore and several other structures have disappeared since 1984.

In 1987 the property was purchased by the Brisbane City Council, tenders were called for its development and a fire partially destroyed Store No 1. The unoccupied Store No 2 has suffered degradation from vandals and white ant infestation.

== Description ==
The complex stands on a narrow strip of river flat with steep cliffs and includes the following items:

- Store No 1 (1886–88), the ground floor and charred remnants of the first floor are all that remain as a result of the 1987 fire. Prior to the fire, style and construction were similar to that of Store No 2.
- Store No 2 (1886–88) is smaller in floor size. It has two gablets with hoists and two pairs of ventilators. There are pairs of board doors and a set of wooden stairs inside and outside provides access to the first floor. It has a hardwood frame clad with corrugated iron. The ground floor is concrete with concrete footings and stone plinths and the roof has twin gables. Sash windows are multi-paned and protected by sunhoods. Walls and ceilings are lined with tongue and groove boards. At the northern end is a skillion roofed smithy and forge.
- Wharf (1887–88) is an integral part of the stores. Wooden piles support the wooden decking and stanchions. The wharf has been resheeted with diagonal boarding over the original.
- Wooden stairs (c.1890) connect various parts of the complex and are currently in a very dilapidated state and unsafe for public use.
- Turntable (c.1900), for manoeuvring guns to and from ships. Only the outline remains.
- Paint store (c.1900), a one room timber structure on stumps with a corrugated iron hip roof.
- Magazine (c.1900), a single room weatherboard structure with corrugated iron gable roof and brick stumps.
- Slip (c.1900) is concrete and has been extended over the years.
- Duty hut, a one room weatherboard structure with corrugated iron pyramid roof that is lined internally.
- Changing rooms, timber with sloping corrugated iron roof; built on the foundations of the 1890s boat shed.
- Toilet facilities, a timber and corrugated iron structure.

The site remains a strong visual element of the riverscape.

== Heritage listing ==
Naval Stores (former) was listed on the Queensland Heritage Register on 21 October 1992 having satisfied the following criteria.

The place is important in demonstrating the evolution or pattern of Queensland's history.

The former Naval Stores provide evidence of the Queensland Marine Defence Force which was an integral part of the Queensland colonial defences.

The place is important because of its aesthetic significance.

The former Naval Stores are significant as part of the historic cityscape at Kangaroo Point which includes the former Kangaroo Point quarry, St Mary's Church group and the linking cliff face stairs.

The place has a strong or special association with a particular community or cultural group for social, cultural or spiritual reasons.

The Stores are significant for their continuous association with both colonial and Commonwealth defence forces.
