= Half Dozen Group of Artists =

The Half Dozen Group of Artists is an art society based in Brisbane, Queensland, Australia. Established in 1941, the group encourages the development of local artists and holds an annual exhibition in Brisbane.

== History ==
The society was founded on 9 April 1941 by six artists, led by Lilian Pedersen. ?The other founders were Mona Elliott (the first chairperson), Frank Sherrin, Rosalie Wilson, Leonard Shillam and Ann Ross. Its patron was James Vincent Duhig.

The Group was based for many years in the St Mary's art studio, beneath the church hall of St. Mary's Anglican Church, Kangaroo Point, Brisbane. It now operates workshops from a studio at 37 Quarry Rd, Sherwood.

Founding members included sculptor Lewis Jarvis Harvey.

In 2021 the Half Dozen Group of Artists Inc. celebrates its 80th birthday. The Annual Exhibition continues as a major feature of its history and events.
