= HMQS Miner =

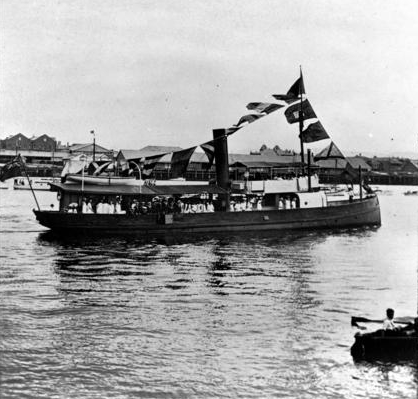
- Miner in 1922

History

Queensland
- Builder: Evans Anderson & Phelon, Brisbane
- In service: 1887
- Out of service: 1901
- Home port: Brisbane, Queensland
- Fate: Sold to private operator. Abandoned as breakwater, Bishop Island, 1953.

General characteristics
- Displacement: 65 tons
- Length: 92 ft 9 in (28.27 m)
- Beam: 15 ft (4.6 m)
- Draught: 5 ft (1.5 m) forward, 4' aft
- Speed: 8 knots (15 km/h; 9.2 mph)

HMQS Miner was a vessel built for the Queensland Army before being transferred to the Queensland Maritime Defence Force. She was not taken on strength by the Commonwealth Naval Forces at Federation in 1901 and subsequently sold.

== Construction and design ==
Displacing 65 tons, HMQS Miner was constructed by Evans Anderson & Phelon in Brisbane, Queensland, in 1887. She was 92.75 feet (28.27 m) long, had a 15-foot (4.6 m) beam and a draught of 5 feet (1.5 m) forward and 4 feet (1.2 m) aft. Miner was capable of sailing at a top speed of 8 knots (15 km/h; 9.2 mph).

== Service history ==
HMQS Miner was originally built for the Queensland Army as a military steamer. At some stage after this she was transferred to the Queensland Maritime Defence Force and refitted for service as a submarine miner. An inspection of the vessel on 8 March 1901 determined that she was "in good condition but unsuitable for submarine mining defence".

Upon Federation, when the colonial navies were combined to form the Commonwealth Naval Forces, HMQS Miner sold to a civilian owner. She was put on Bishop Island at the mouth of the Brisbane River in 1953. HMQS Miner is one of up to fifteen ships to be used to build up what was previously known as Hercules Bank and Bishop Island. The area has recently been reclaimed to extend facilities at the Port of Brisbane.

== See also ==
- List of Queensland Maritime Defence Force ships
- Colonial navies of Australia – Queensland
- List of Royal Australian Navy ships
