= HMQS Midge =

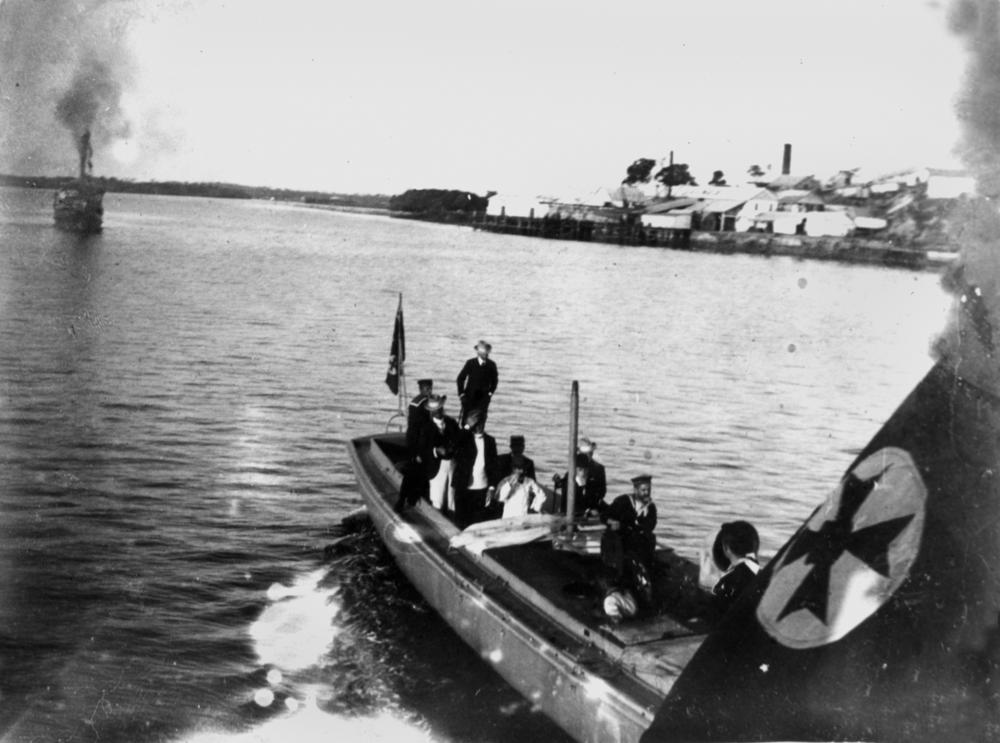
- HMQS Midge

History

Queensland and Australia
- Name: Midge
- Builder: J. Samuel White, Cowes
- Yard number: 744
- Laid down: October 1887
- In service: 1887
- Out of service: 1912
- Homeport: Brisbane, Queensland
- Fate: Sold as private pleasure craft in 1912

General characteristics
- Displacement: 12 tons
- Length: 56 ft 4 in (17.17 m)
- Beam: 9 ft 3 in (2.82 m)
- Draught: 4 ft 7 in (1.40 m)
- Complement: 7
- Armament: 1 × QF 3-pounder Hotchkiss, 2 × 1-inch Nordenfelt gun, originally one spar torpedo and later 2 sets of dropping gear for 14 inch torpedoes

HMQS Midge was a torpedo launch that served with the Queensland Maritime Defence Force, the Commonwealth Naval Forces and the Royal Australian Navy. After entering service in 1887, Midge served as "picquet boat" along the Brisbane River until Federation in 1901, when she was transferred to the Commonwealth. After this, she served as a training boat until 1912 when she was decommissioned.

== Construction and design ==
Following the formation of the Queensland Maritime Defence Force the colonial government decided to supplement the recently acquired vessels with a small torpedo launch. HMQS Midge was specifically built in England by J. Samuel White, Cowes, for this purpose and shipped out to Australia in 1887. She was of wooden construction using a combination of teak and mahogany, and cost 5,000 pounds sterling. Displacing 12 tons, she was 56 ft 4 in (17.17 m) long, had a 9 ft 3 in (2.82 m) beam and a draught of 4 ft 7 in (1.40 m). The ship was armed with one 3-pounder gun and two machine guns. Originally she carried one spar torpedo and later had two sets of dropping gear for 14 inch torpedoes.

== Service history ==
Like HMQS Mosquito, she was never commissioned but simply placed into service when required and therefore was usually moored at the Naval Stores Depot at Kangaroo Point on the Brisbane River. She served as a "picquet boat" until Federation in 1901 when she was transferred to the Commonwealth and served as a training ship. Midge was still on strength in 1911 when the Royal Australian Navy was formed but she was stripped and paid off the next year. Midge's engines were found to be in such good condition that they went on to be used for many years at the Royal Australian Navy's engineering school. The hull was sold as a private yacht in 1912, and was renamed Nola II.

== See also ==
- List of Queensland Maritime Defence Force ships
- List of Royal Australian Navy ships

== Bibliography ==
- Gillett, Ross (1977). Warships of Australia. Adelaide: Rigby. ISBN 0-7270-0472-7.
- Winfield, Rif; Lyon, David (2004). The Sail and Steam Navy List: All the Ships of the Royal Navy 1815–1889. London: Chatham Publishing. ISBN 978-1-86176-032-6.
