= Queensland Maritime Defence Force Auxiliary Gunboats =

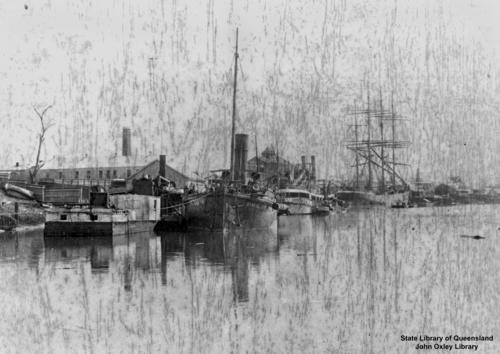
- Bonito in 1896

Class overview
- Name: Queensland auxiliary gunboats
- Builders: Walkers of Maryborough
- Operators: Queensland and Australia
- Preceded by: None
- Succeeded by: None
- Built: 1884–1885
- In service: 1884 – at least 1901
- In commission: 1884 – at least 1901
- Completed: 5
- Active: 0
- Retired: 5

General characteristics
- Displacement: 450 tons
- Propulsion: Expansion steam engines
- Armament: 1 × BL 5-inch (127 mm) gun; Except Benito: 1 × 64-pounder gun

After the formation of the Queensland Maritime Defence Force in 1884, the colonial government purchased two gunboats and a torpedo boat to equip the new force. However, given the number of ports along the Queensland coast, it was realised that additional ships were required. Five ships had already been ordered for the Queensland Department of Harbours and Rivers when the decision was taken to convert them to also serve as auxiliary gunboats. This resulted in the fitting of a 5-inch gun and the relocation of the boilers below the waterline. The ships were as follows: Bonito, Bream, Dolphin, Pumba, and Stingaree.

Steam-propelled twin screwed "hopper barges", these ships were built by Walkers at Maryborough and, at 450 tons, they were the largest warships built in the Australian colonies before Federation. The depression of the 1890s greatly curtailed operations with most of the vessels placed in reserve and being used as training vessels. Stingaree served until 1895 whilst Pumba remained on strength at the time of Federation in 1901, before being sold to Pioneer Gravels (Queensland). She was rebuilt in 1958 and renamed Enterprise, serving as a cargo vessel beyond the late 1970s. Bream (1963), Dolphin (1963) and Stingaree (1966) were sunk off Tangalooma, Moreton Bay.

== See also ==
- List of Queensland Maritime Defence Force ships
- Colonial navies of Australia – Queensland
