= HMQS Otter =

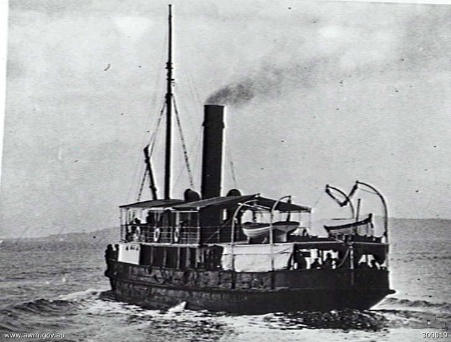
- Otter in 1946

History

Queensland and Australia
- Name: Otter
- Builder: Ramage and Ferguson
- Launched: 19 July 1884
- In service: 1884
- Out of service: 1906
- Reinstated: WW I and WW II
- Homeport: Brisbane, Queensland
- Fate: Scrapped 1946

General characteristics
- Displacement: 220 tons
- Speed: 12 knots (22 km/h; 14 mph)
- Armament: 1 × 5 inch gun (later 1 × 64-pounder)

HMQS Otter was launched in 1884 and served as a patrol vessel that served with the Queensland Maritime Defence Force and Commonwealth Naval Forces. She was paid off and sold in 1906, but the Royal Australian Navy requisitioned her in both world wars.

== Construction and design ==
Built by Ramage & Ferguson, Otter was launched on July 19, 1884. Originally designed as a tug, during its construction, the ship was purchased by the Queensland Maritime Defence Force and was converted for military service. She was fitted with a single 5-inch gun, allowing her to operate as an auxiliary. Displacing 220 tons, she was capable of 12 knots (22 km/h; 14 mph). A 64-pounder gun later replaced her 5–inch gun.

== Service history ==
Following the Jervois-Scratchley reports the colonial governments of Australia restructured their defence forces. This process led to the formation of the Queensland Maritime Defence Force. To equip the new force the colonial government initially ordered two gunboats and a torpedo boat. As an interim measure as well as to supplement the purpose–built warships it was decided that other ships already under construction be modified for military use. Otter was one of the ships chosen and in military service she performed tender duties and conducted patrols. Following Federation she was transferred to the Commonwealth but served only until 1906 when she was paid off.

During World War I, the Royal Australian Navy (RAN) requisitioned Otter from her civilian owner and used her as an examination vessel. Following the conclusion of hostilities, the RAN returned her to her previous owner. In World War II, Otter again served as an examination vessel but only until December 1940. Otter was returned to private operations on Moreton Bay, and was scrapped in 1946.

== See also ==
- List of Queensland Maritime Defence Force ships
- Colonial navies of Australia – Queensland
