= Port Office, Brisbane =

Heritage-listed building in Brisbane, Queensland

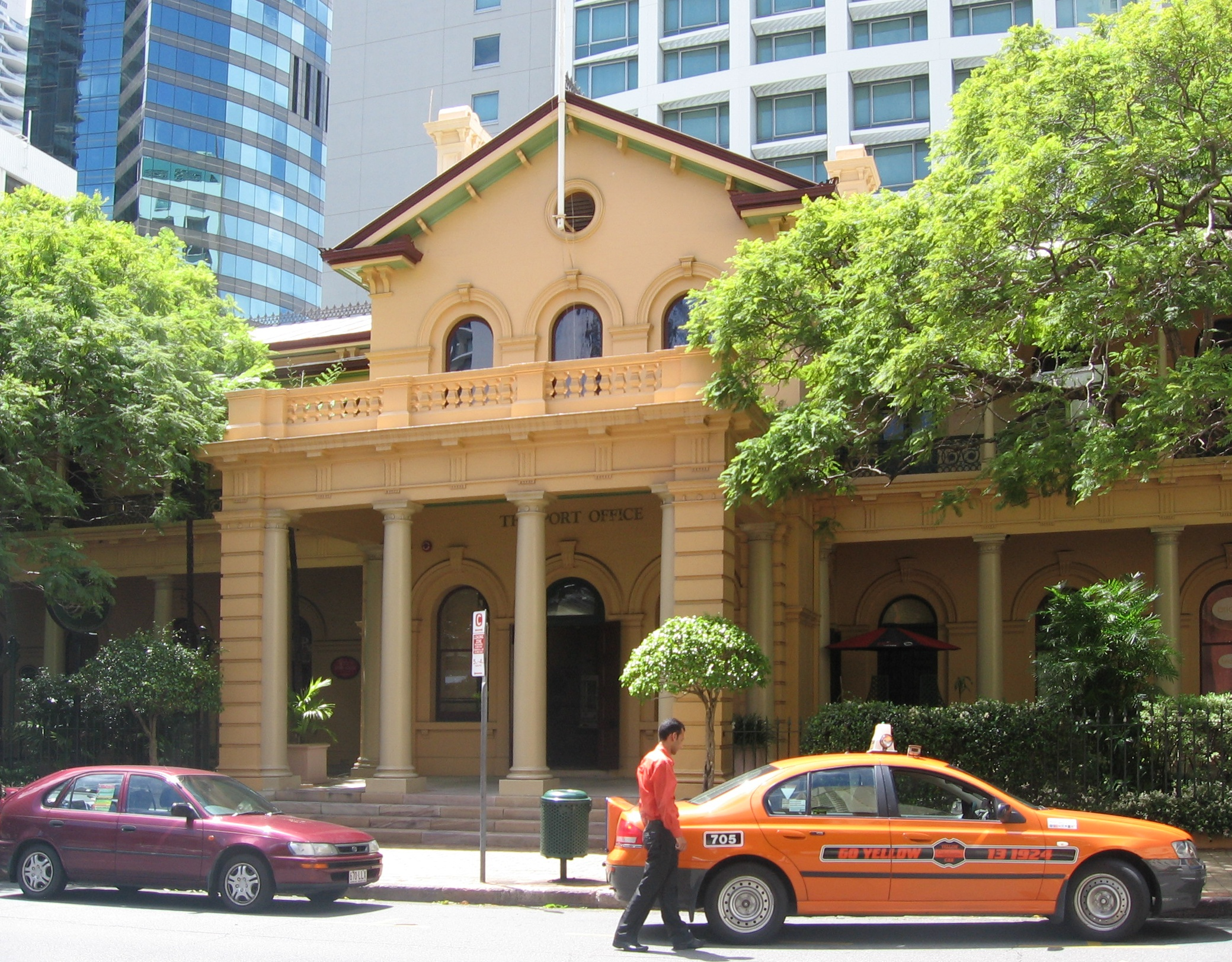
- former Port Office, 2010

- Location within Queensland Location within Australia
- 27.4714°S 153.0305°E
- Location: 39 Edward Street, Brisbane City, City of Brisbane, Queensland, Australia

History
- Design period: 1870s–1890s (late 19th century)
- Built: 1879–1929

Site notes
- Architect: Francis Drummond Greville Stanley
- Architectural style: Classicism

Queensland Heritage Register
- Official name: The Port Office, Stamford Plaza, Harbours and Marine Building
- Type: state heritage (built)
- Designated: 21 October 1992
- Reference no.: 600088
- Significant period: 1870s–1880s, 1920s (fabric); 1870s–1980s (historical)
- Builders: John Petrie

The Port Office is a heritage-listed former government building (now a hotel restaurant) at 39 Edward Street in Brisbane, Queensland, Australia. It was designed by Francis Drummond Greville Stanley and built from 1879 to 1929 by John Petrie. It is also known as Stamford Plaza and the Harbours & Marine Building. It was added to the Queensland Heritage Register on 21 October 1992.

== History ==
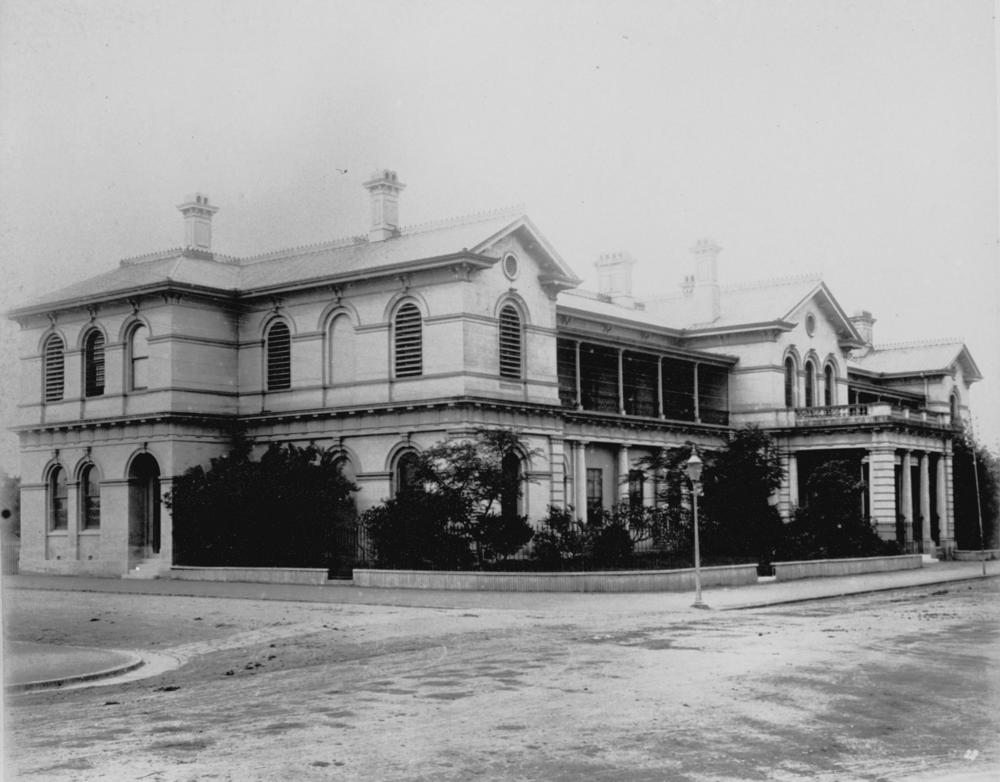
Port Office in Edward Street, Brisbane, 1889

The Port Office was built in 1879–80 to a design by FDG Stanley, the Queensland Colonial Architect. It replaced an earlier building nearby. The contractor was John Petrie who had tendered £8,811 for the work. The building was erected on land adjoining the old Port Office. A slipway and wharves for use by the department were adjacent. In 1885 a two-storey extension was constructed at the rear of the building.

In 1929 the building was extended to provide more space for the Department of Labour which had occupied the building since 1906. A tide marker on the wall of the building since the turn of the century was damaged during the 1974 floods but was later replaced.

In 1988 the property was leased to a private company and the building became part of the Heritage Hotel complex, later the Stamford Plaza Hotel. Extensive renovations were undertaken including the removal of all post 1880 additions, and the addition of the end balconies which were shown on the Colonial Architect's original plans.

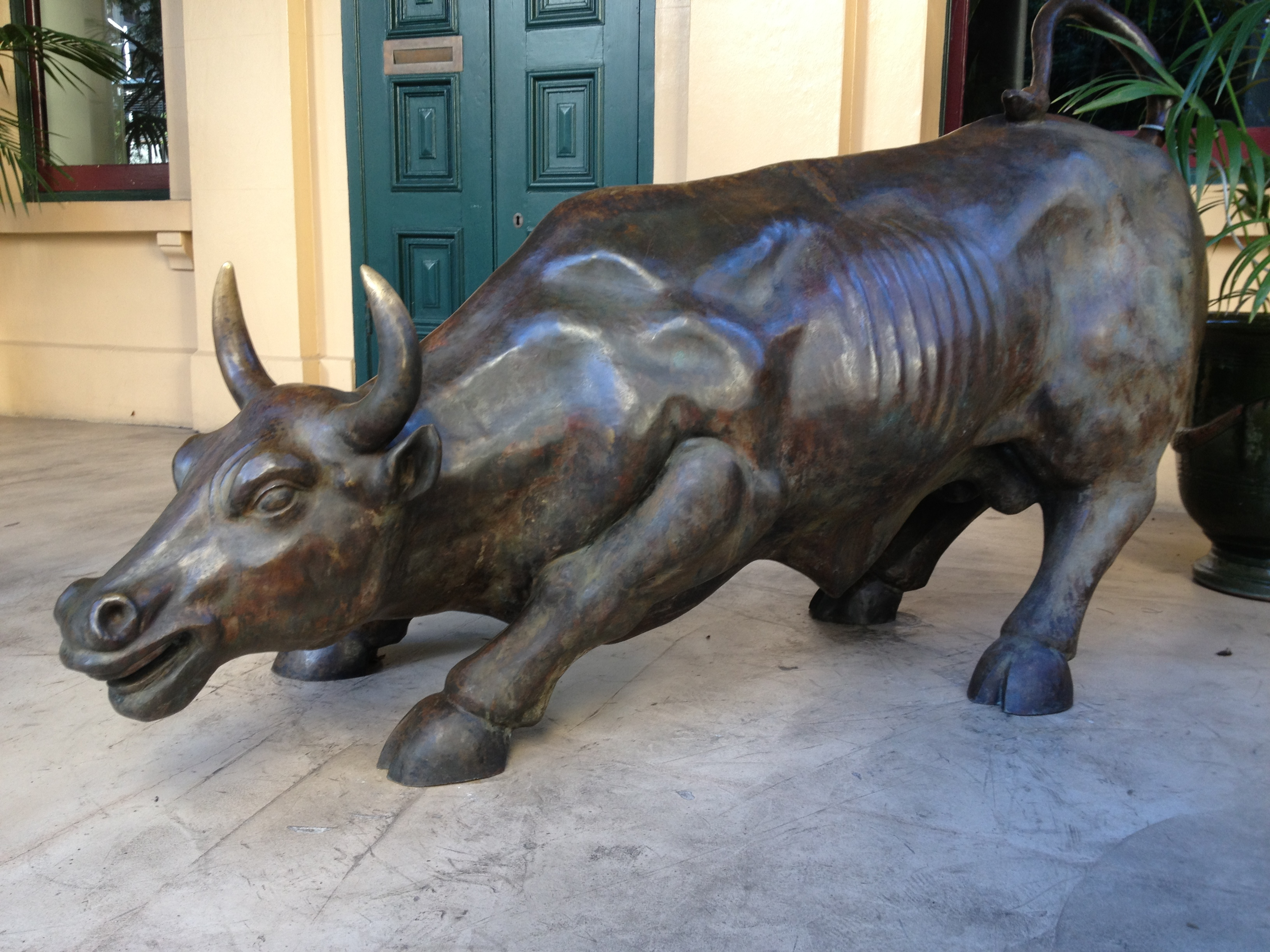
The Bull Sculpture, associated with the Moo Moo Restaurant, 2013

Since June 2010, the former Port Office has been operating as the Moo Moo Wine Bar and Grill within the Stamford Plaza Hotel.

== Description ==
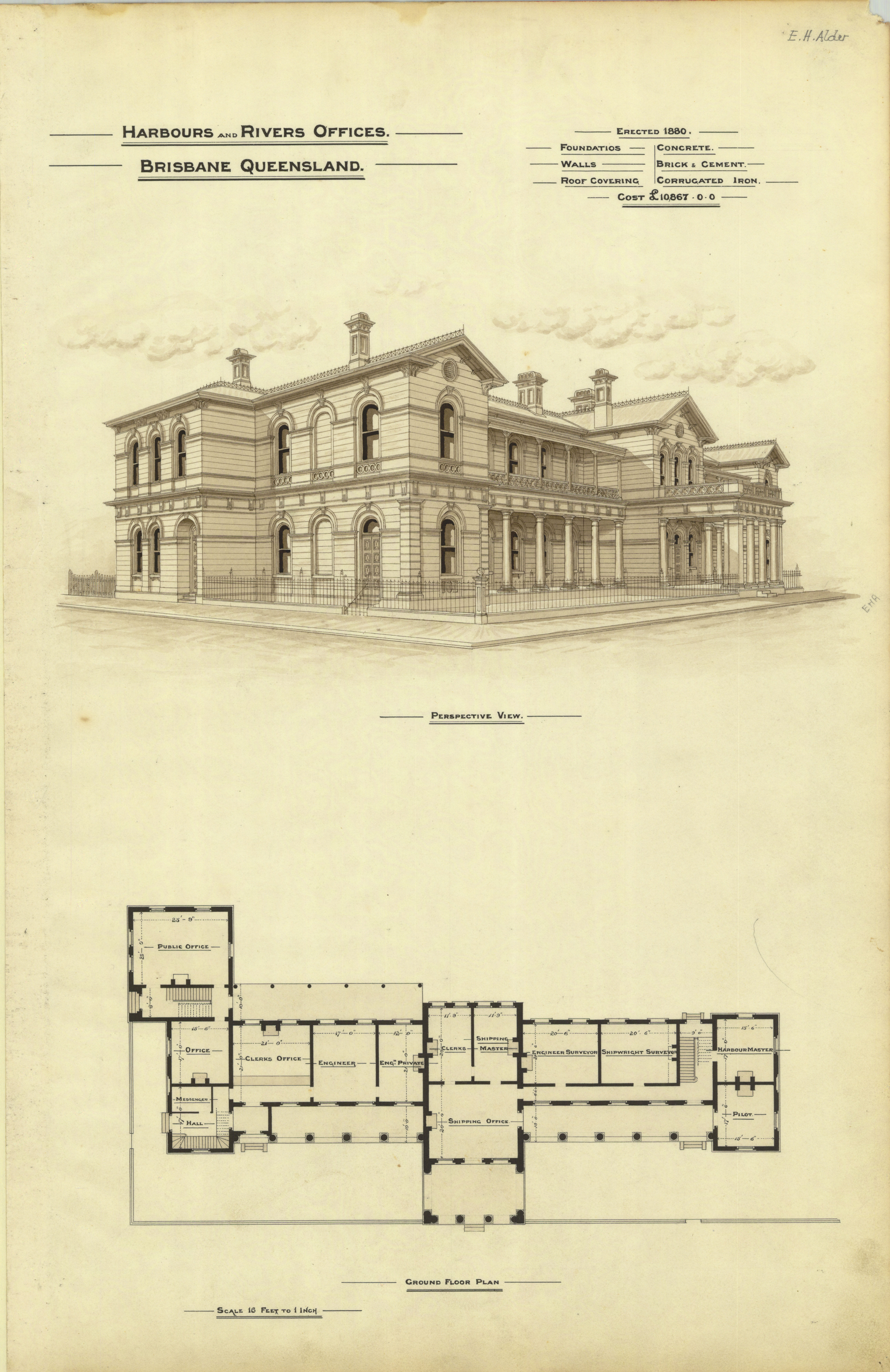
Architectural plan of the Harbours and Rivers Offices, circa 1888

The Port Office is a two-storey, 1880s building which features restrained Classical detailing combined with decorative cast-iron work. The building has a prominent entry porch with an extensive elevation facing Edward Street. It has three gable ended projecting bays connected by verandahs. The walls are rendered brick while the roof is sheeted in rolled iron. The lower floor level features plain circular columns supporting the verandah and keyed pilasters. The upper-level verandah has slender cast-iron columns.

The building has austere Classical detailing with Roman arched openings and a string course in the form of a cornice that runs the perimeter of the building above the ground floor windows. The building has circular ventilator openings in each gable end. Above the roof are chimneys of varying heights, and decorative cast iron ridge cresting. The building is now separated from the Brisbane River by the Stamford Plaza Hotel.

Internally, the building has been extensively renovated and adapted to include ground level speciality shops and a restaurant and bar on the top floor. Two of the shops on the ground floor have had mezzanine levels inserted. Otherwise original ceiling heights have been retained.

== Heritage listing ==
The Port Office was listed on the Queensland Heritage Register on 21 October 1992 having satisfied the following criteria.

The place is important in demonstrating the evolution or pattern of Queensland's history.

Evidence of the expansion of maritime trade in the late 1870s and its importance to the developing economy of the colony.

The place is important in demonstrating the principal characteristics of a particular class of cultural places.

An example of the work of Colonial Architect FDG Stanley, and of building contractor John Petrie.

The place is important because of its aesthetic significance.

Its contribution to the streetscape as part of a maritime precinct.
