= Old Mineral House =

Heritage-listed building in Brisbane, Queensland

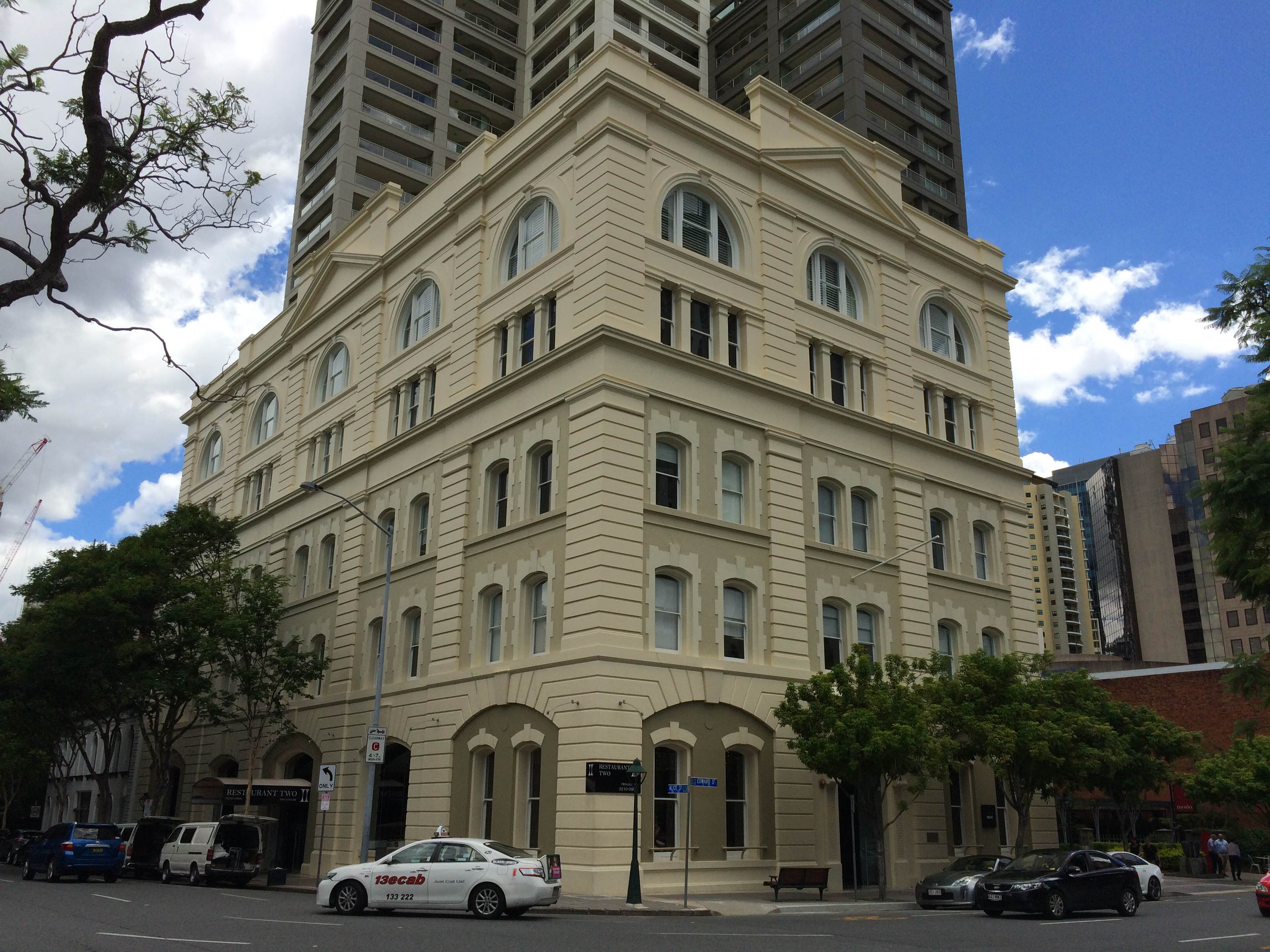
- Old Mineral House, 2015

- Location within Queensland Location within Australia
- 27.4722°S 153.0303°E
- Location: 2 Edward Street, Brisbane City, City of Brisbane, Queensland, Australia

History
- Design period: 1870s–1890s (late 19th century)
- Built: 1888–1890s

Site notes
- Architect: Richard Gailey
- Architectural style: Classicism

Queensland Heritage Register
- Official name: Old Mineral House, Smellie & Co Warehouse
- Type: state heritage (built)
- Designated: 21 October 1992
- Reference no.: 600092
- Significant period: 1888, 1890s (fabric); 1888–1930, 1945 (historical)
- Builders: William Anthony

Old Mineral House is a heritage-listed warehouse at 2 Edward Street, Brisbane City, City of Brisbane, Queensland, Australia. It was designed by Richard Gailey and built from 1888 to 1890s by William Anthony. It is also known as Smellie & Co Warehouse and the Industrial High School. It was added to the Queensland Heritage Register on 21 October 1992.

== History ==
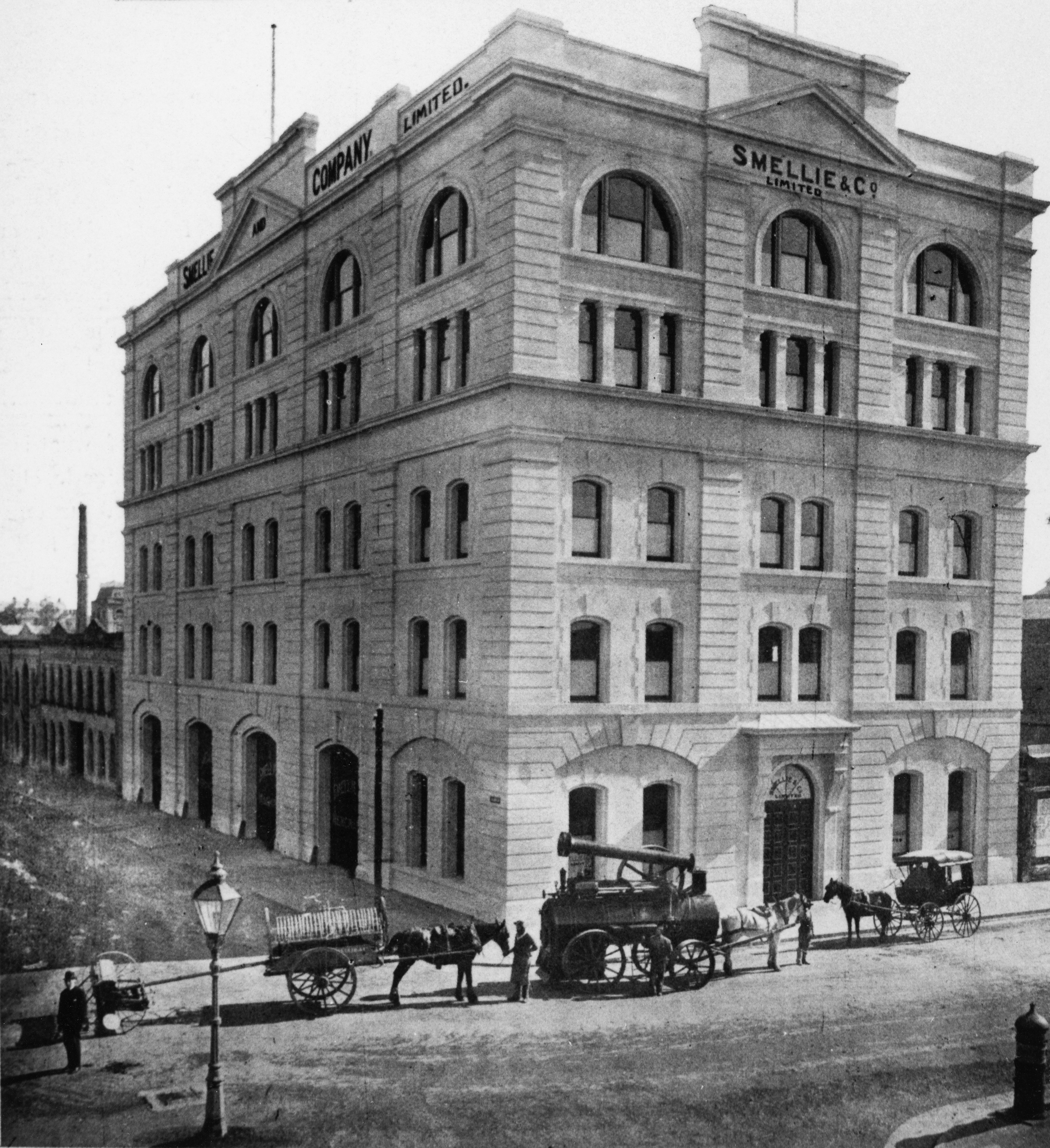
Smellie & Co. Warehouse, corner of Edward and Alice Street, Brisbane, circa 1920

This warehouse was constructed for the firm of Smellie & Co in 1888 with extensions in the late 1890s.

RR Smellie & Co was established in the 1860s as a foundry and engineering works in Alice Street, producing cast iron products for the building industry, and equipment for steamships and locomotives. In the 1880s, RR Smellie & Co altered the orientation of its business, concentrating on importing machinery, implements, and general hardware supplies. The repair and manufacturing plant of RR Smellie & Co was continued by Smith, Forrester, and Co. In 1882, the company became known as Smellie & Co.

The change in direction of the business meant that Smellie & Co required warehouse space. A double-storeyed warehouse was constructed further along Alice Street c. 1884 but these premises proved to be too small as the business prospered in the 1880s. In 1888 a new warehouse, designed by Richard Gailey, was built for the company on the corner of Edward and Alice Streets in 1888. A three storeyed building, it was erected by William Anthony who had tended £6,987 for the project. The warehouse stocked a diverse range of hardware, engineering requisites, and farming equipment.

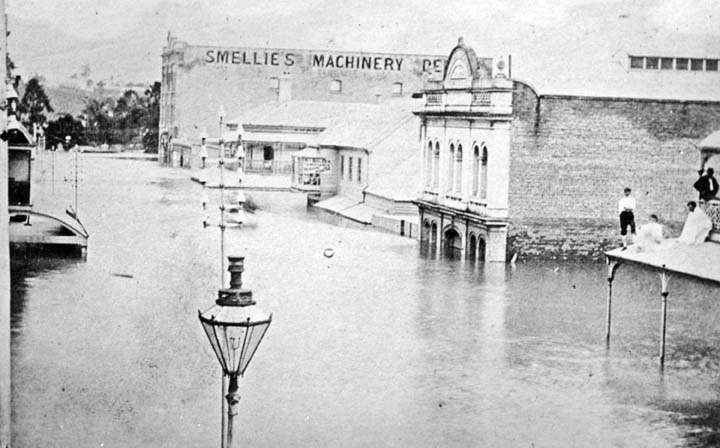
Smellie & Co warehouse (far building on right-hand side of Edward Street), flooded in 1893

The warehouse was flooded in the 1893 Brisbane flood.

Two storeys were added to the building in the late 1890s as a result of the continuing expansion of the company's business.

In 1930 this building was leased to ACB Limited, drapers, and in 1935, the Department of Public Works became lessees. The Queensland Government purchased the property in 1945, along with a number of buildings owned by the firm in the area. Smellie & Co Pty Ltd went into voluntary liquidation in 1946.

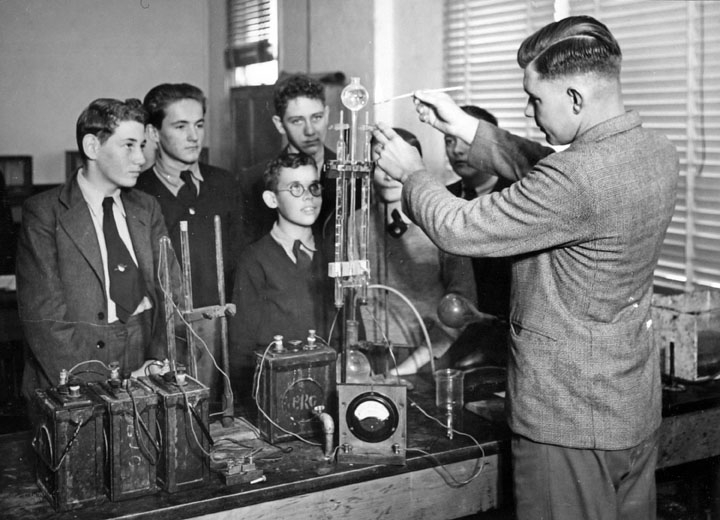
Industrial High School, Science Class, Demonstration of an electrolysis rig, April 1951

The Department of Public Works has used this building for a variety of purposes since 1945. These uses have given the building its various names – Naval House, the Industrial High School, and Mineral House.

The Industrial High School moved into the building in 1947. The school had previously been at the Central Technical College (now the Gardens Point campus of Queensland University of Technology) but the conditions there were very cramped.

In 2015, the building is occupied by a number of businesses including Cox Architecture.

== Description ==
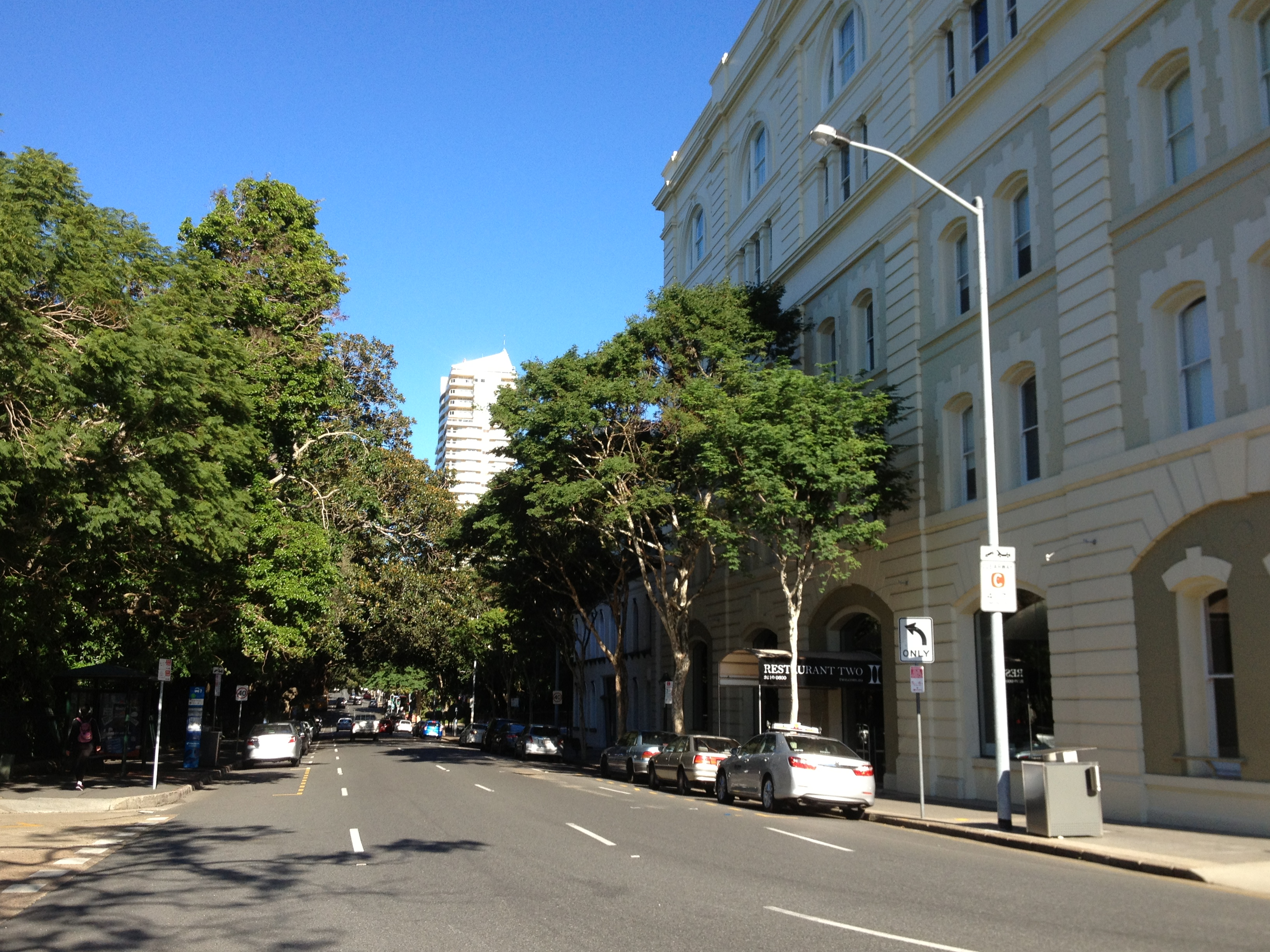
Old Mineral House (Alice Street frontage), 2013

Old Mineral House, situated on the corner of Edward and Alice Streets, is a five storeyed building of rendered brick, with a cast iron and timber internal structure and timber flooring.

The street facades are visually divided by rendered vertical bands imitating stonework into three bays in Edward Street, and five in Alice Street. The ground floor level is rendered to simulate broad segmental arched openings with keystones, some containing a pair of windows and others single large openings. The main entry is in the central bay of the Edward Street facade and has a semi-circular arched opening with flanking pilasters supporting an austere projecting entablature and cornice. Paired window openings are situated in the bays on the first and second floors. These are spaced to fit the size of each bay and have rendered quoined surrounds.

A frieze with a cornice above marks the top of the original building. The same bays are continued above this to the new parapet but contain different types of window openings. On the fourth level each bay has three window openings consisting of a wide central one, flanked by narrower openings separated by small pilasters, while on the fifth level, the openings are arched. Another cornice runs around the top of the building at parapet level. Classical pediments free of ornament are situated at the parapet level of the central bay of each street facade. The parapets step to a raised central section which stands above these.

Internally the building's structure is predominantly intact. It consists of cast iron columns supporting timber beams on the lower levels and timber beams and columns on the additional upper levels. The staircases and lifts are more recent additions.

Walter's Steakhouse and Bar currently resides on the ground floor level of Old Mineral House.

== Heritage listing ==
Old Mineral House was listed on the Queensland Heritage Register on 21 October 1992 having satisfied the following criteria.

The place is important in demonstrating the evolution or pattern of Queensland's history.

As an example of an intact late Victorian era warehouse with classical detailing

For the disciplined manner in which it articulates the corner and terminates both the Alice and Edward Street streetscapes

For its association with the firm of Smellie & Co, a prominent Queensland importing, engineering and iron founding firm of the nineteenth century

The place is important in demonstrating the principal characteristics of a particular class of cultural places.

As an example of an intact late Victorian era warehouse with classical detailing

The place is important because of its aesthetic significance.

For the disciplined manner in which it articulates the corner and terminates both the Alice and Edward Street streetscapes

The place has a special association with the life or work of a particular person, group or organisation of importance in Queensland's history.

For its association with the firm of Smellie & Co, a prominent Queensland importing, engineering and iron founding firm of the nineteenth century

== See also ==
Other Smellie & Co buildings:

- Smellie's Building, Edward Street
- Britannia Foundry, Alice Street
