= Smellie's Building =

Heritage-listed building in Brisbane, Queensland

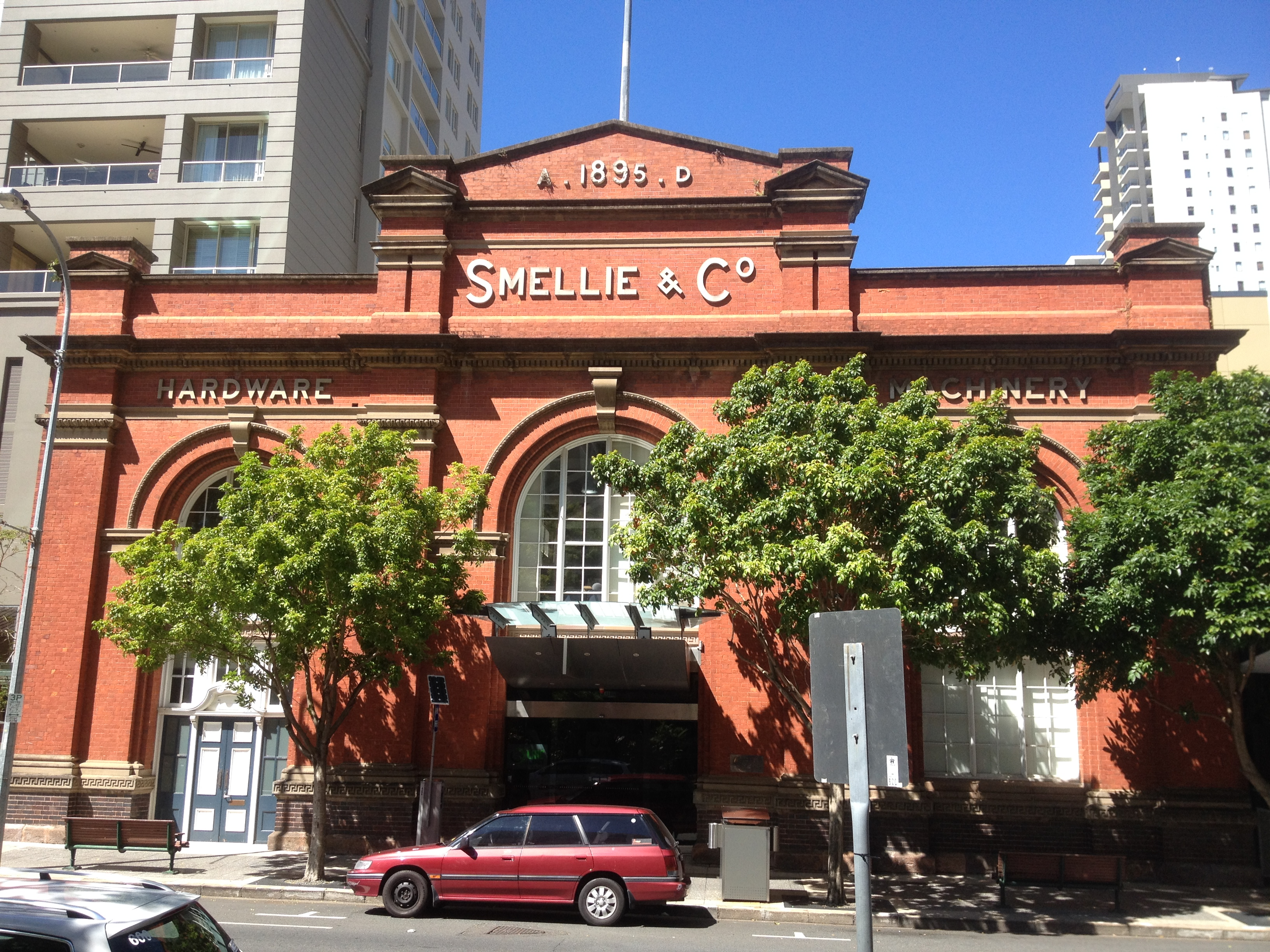
- Smellie's Building, 2013

- Location within Queensland Location within Australia
- 27.4718°S 153.03°E
- Location: 32 Edward Street, Brisbane City, City of Brisbane, Queensland, Australia

History
- Design period: 1870s–1890s (late 19th century)
- Built: 1895–1896

Site notes
- Architect: Claude William Chambers

Queensland Heritage Register
- Official name: Smellie's Building
- Type: state heritage (built)
- Designated: 21 October 1992
- Reference no.: 600097
- Significant period: 1895–1896 (fabric); 1896–1945 (historical)

Smellie's Building is a heritage-listed warehouse at 32 Edward Street, Brisbane City, City of Brisbane, Queensland, Australia. It was designed by Claude William Chambers and built from 1895 to 1896. It was added to the Queensland Heritage Register on 21 October 1992.

== History ==
This warehouse was constructed in 1895–96 for the importing firm Smellie & Co.

RR Smellie & Co was established in the 1860s as a foundry and engineering works in Alice Street. Like others in the area, the firm produced cast iron products for the building industry, and equipment for steamships and locomotives. In the 1880s, RR Smellie & Co altered the orientation of its business, concentrating on importing machinery, implements, and general hardware supplies. In 1882, the company became known as Smellie & Co.

Smellie's premises in Alice Street proved to be too small as the business prospered in the 1880s. An additional warehouse was constructed further along Alice Street c. 1884. A three storeyed warehouse (Old Mineral House) designed by Richard Gailey was constructed in 1888 on the corner of Edward and Alice Streets. This expansion of warehouse space was not sufficient to accommodate the ever-increasing trade of Smellie & Co, and a new bulk warehouse was constructed nearby in Edward Street in 1895–96. The architect for the building was Claude William Chambers.

From this warehouse Smellie & Co stocked a diverse range of hardware, engineering requisites, and farming equipment.

The company remained a prominent merchandising firm in Queensland until the 1930s when the economic depression adversely affected its business. During this period it began leasing its various properties in this area to the Department of Public Works. The Queensland Government acquired this property in 1945, along with a number of buildings owned by Smellie & Co. In 1946 Smellie & Co went into voluntary liquidation.

The Department of Public Works has used this building as storage, and as a car park, among other uses.

== Description ==
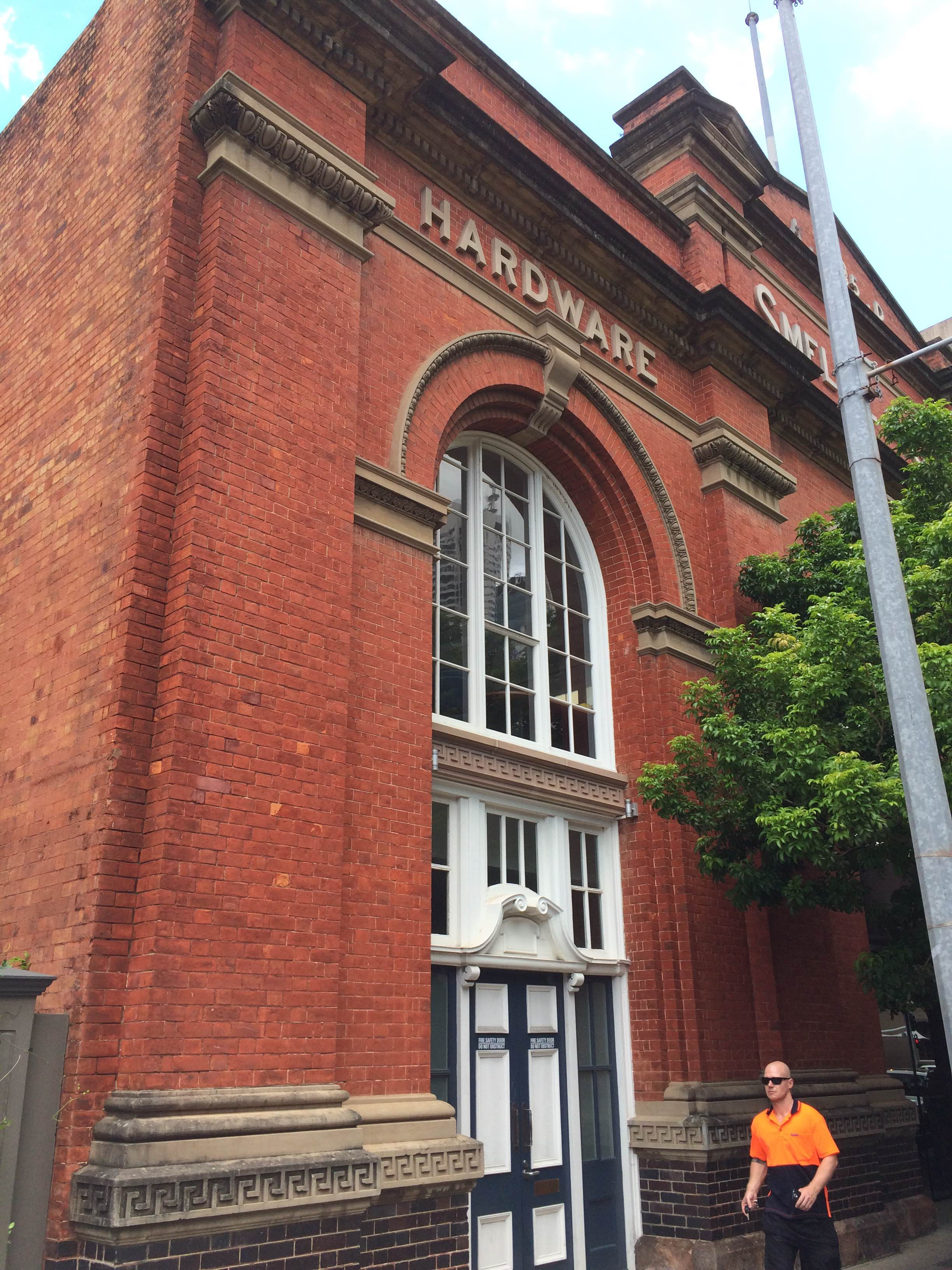
Smellie's Building, arched opening, 2015

This brick warehouse, located at the Brisbane River end of Edward Street, internally has a large timber structure incorporating a mezzanine level with a central opening.

The main facade, of tuck-pointed red brick, reflects the structural bays of the building with a large central arched opening, and slightly smaller flanking arches. The three bays are defined by brick pilasters which extend through to the parapet. The windows in the upper portions of each bay have narrow timber glazing bars. The central bay contains a roller shutter door while the bay on the eastern end contains a timber door with a carved timber baroque pediment.

The base of the building creates a podium consisting of darker coloured brick on a porphyry plinth stone with an upper section having a Greek key pattern in render.

The parapet is divided by raised elements which continue the line of the pilasters. Each of these is topped by a small classical pediment. The central portion of the parapet is raised and comes to a shallow peak with a flag pole behind. The name "SMELLIE & CO" appears prominently in render above the central bay. The date "1895" and the words "HARDWARE AND MACHINERY" also appear on the main facade.

The clerestory, on each side of the central king post trussed roof, provides natural light to both levels through the central mezzanine opening. Large timber beams and columns support both the mezzanine level and the roof. The mezzanine flooring is supported on closely spaced timber joists separated by herring-bone strutting.

== Heritage listing ==
Smellie's Building was listed on the Queensland Heritage Register on 21 October 1992 having satisfied the following criteria.

The place is important in demonstrating the evolution or pattern of Queensland's history.

Smellie's Building is part of a surviving group of industrial buildings and warehouses in lower Edward Street and Alice Street, demonstrating the evolution of Frog's Hollow as the principal warehousing and light-industrial sector of Brisbane's central business district, which was sustained from the second half of the 19th century through to the early decades of the 20th century.

The place is important in demonstrating the principal characteristics of a particular class of cultural places.

Smellie's Building is significant as an accomplished and intact example of an 1890s warehouse with a finely detailed polychrome brick facade. The building is a good example of the industrial work of well-respected Brisbane architect, CW Chambers.

The place is important because of its aesthetic significance.

Smellie's Building is significant for its contribution to the Edward Street streetscape in association with the Port Office, Old Mineral House, the Port Office Hotel and the Naval Offices.

The place has a special association with the life or work of a particular person, group or organisation of importance in Queensland's history.

Smellie's Building is significant for its association with the firm of Smellie & Co, a prominent Queensland importing, engineering and iron founding firm.

== See also ==
Other Smellie & Co buildings:

- Old Mineral House, corner Edward and Alice Streets
- Britannia Foundry, Alice Street
