= Brisbane City Botanic Gardens =

Botanic garden in Brisbane, Australia

City Botanic Gardens
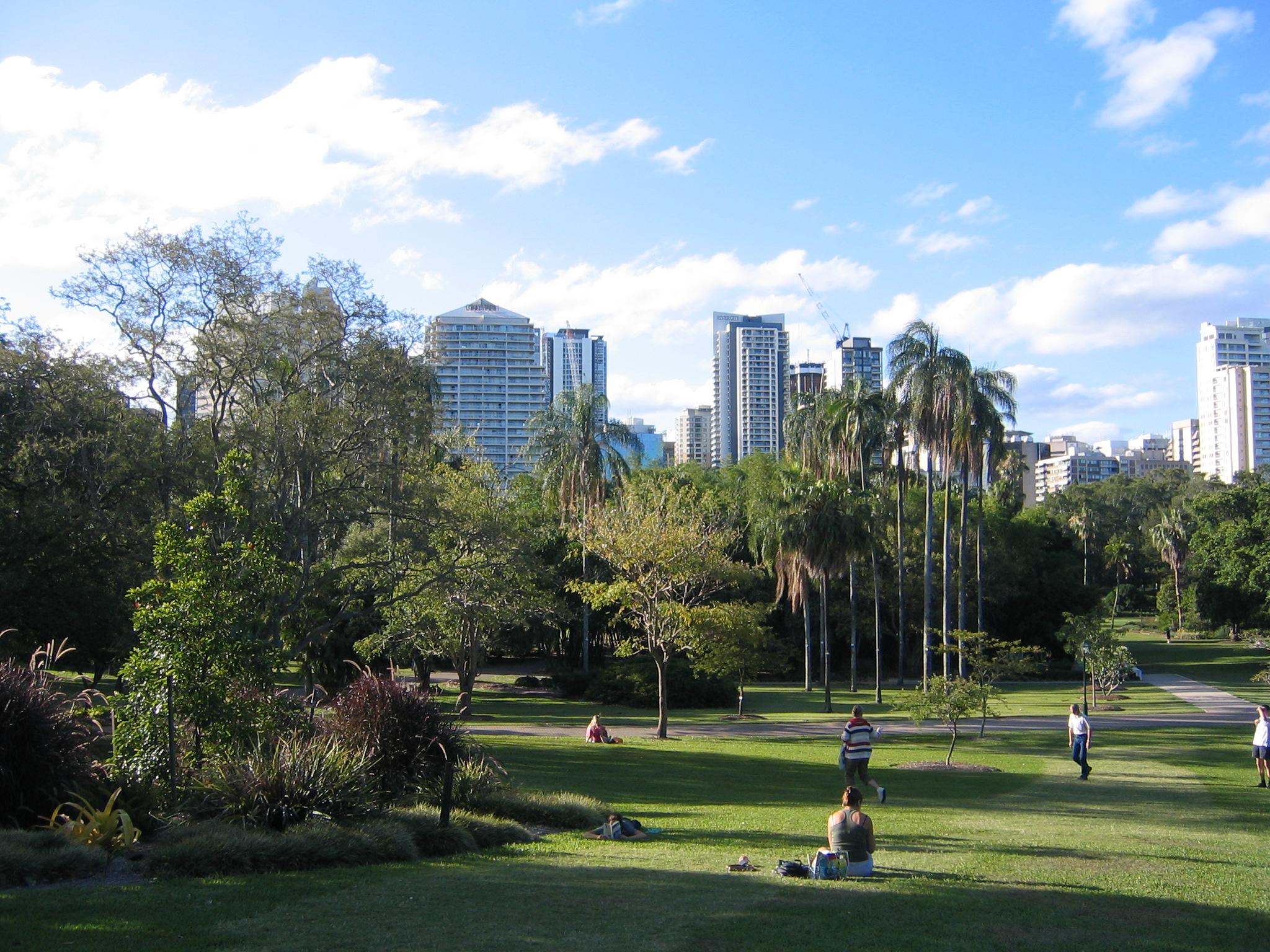
- City Botanic Gardens with buildings in the CBD visible in the background
- Interactive map of City Botanic Gardens
- Type: Botanical
- Location: Brisbane, Queensland, Australia
- Coordinates: 27.4747°S 153.0301°E
- Area: 200,000 m^{2} (49 acres)
- Opened: 1855
- Owner: Brisbane City Council
- Designation: State Heritage Place (Queensland Heritage Register)

City Botanic Gardens
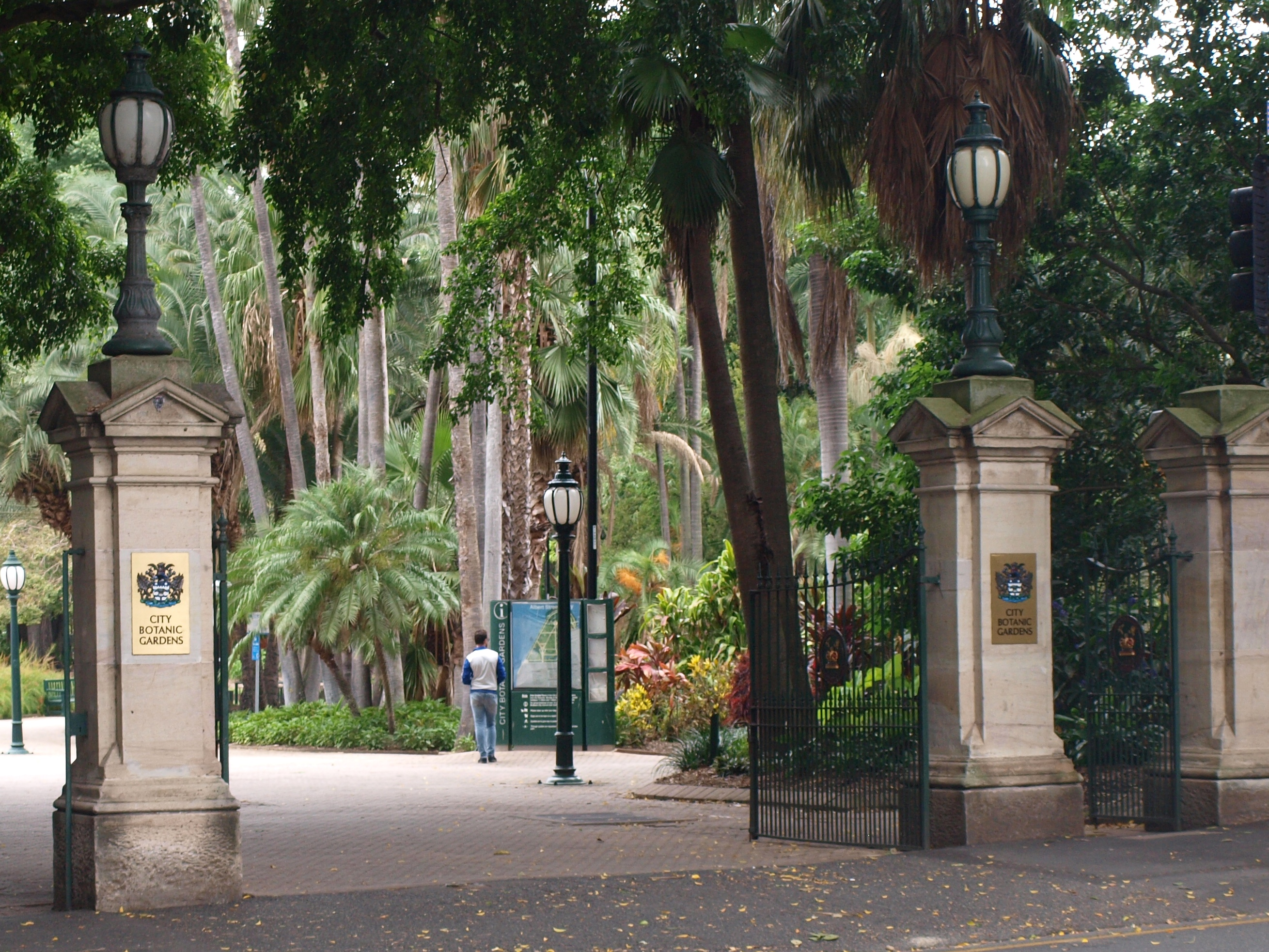
- Entrance gates, Albert Street, 2016

- Location within Queensland
- 27.4759°S 153.0296°E
- Location: 147 Alice Street, Brisbane City, City of Brisbane, Queensland, Australia

History
- Design period: 1824–1841 Convict settlement

Queensland Heritage Register
- Official name: Brisbane Botanic Gardens, Queen's Park, Walter Hill Fountain
- Type: state heritage (built, landscape)
- Designated: 3 February 1997
- Reference no.: 600067
- Significant period: 1865–1920s (fabric); 1828–1855, 1855–1970s, (historical); 1855–ongoing (social)
- Significant components: drain – storm water, gate – entrance, animal enclosure/s, garden – bed/s, tree groups – avenue of, wall/s – retaining, residential accommodation – housing, rotunda, pathway/walkway, lake / pond / waterway, tree groups – copse, fountain, steps/stairway, trees/plantings, garden/grounds, wall/s, amphitheatre

The City Botanic Gardens (formerly the Brisbane Botanic Gardens) is a heritage-listed botanic garden on Alice Street in Brisbane, Queensland, Australia. It was also known as Queen's Park. It is located at Gardens Point in the Brisbane central business district and is bounded by the Brisbane River, Alice Street, George Street, Parliament House and the Queensland University of Technology's Gardens Point campus. It was established in 1825 as a farm for the Moreton Bay penal settlement.

The site includes Brisbane's most mature gardens, with many rare and unusual botanic species. In particular, the gardens feature a special collection of cycads, palms, figs and bamboo.

The City Botanic Gardens were added to the Queensland Heritage Register on 3 February 1997. The Queensland Heritage Register describes the Gardens as "the most significant, non-Aboriginal cultural landscape in Queensland, having a continuous horticultural history since 1828, without any significant loss of land area or change in use over that time. It remains the premier public park and recreational facility for the capital of Queensland, which role it has performed since the early 1840s."

== History ==
Much of the present-day Botanic Gardens was surveyed and selected as the site for a public garden in 1828 by the NSW Colonial Botanist Charles Fraser, three years after the establishment of the Moreton Bay penal settlement at nearby North Quay, Brisbane. Originally the gardens were planted by convicts in 1825 with food crops to feed the prison colony.

In 1855 a portion of several acres was declared a Botanic Reserve. In the same year Walter Hill was appointed as curator of the Botanic Reserve, a position he held until 1881. He began an active planting and experimental program. Some of the older trees planted in the Gardens were the first of their species to be planted in Australia, due to Hill's experiments to acclimatise plants. The experiments served practical outcomes. Plants with potential commercial value were tested in the gardens, first to see if they were viable, to determine what they needed for growth and if a profit could be made. Hill introduced mango, pawpaw, ginger, tamarind, mahogany, poinciana and jacaranda trees as well as tobacco, sugar, grape vines, wheat, tropical fruits, tea, coffee, spices and textile plants. The world's first cultivated macadamia nut tree was planted in 1858 by Walter Hill. He encouraged the work of the sugar pioneer John Buhot which culminated in the first production of granulated sugar in Queensland in April 1862. A cairn was erected at the site where the sugar cane was grown. Hill also supported the work of the Queensland Acclimatisation Society which was formed in 1862, and the Botanic Gardens was the propagation and distribution point for the Society's imports.

The first jacaranda tree in Australia was planted at the Botanic Gardens in 1864 from seedlings collected by a curator from an international ship docked in the Brisbane River. This spawned the popularity of the jacaranda across Brisbane.

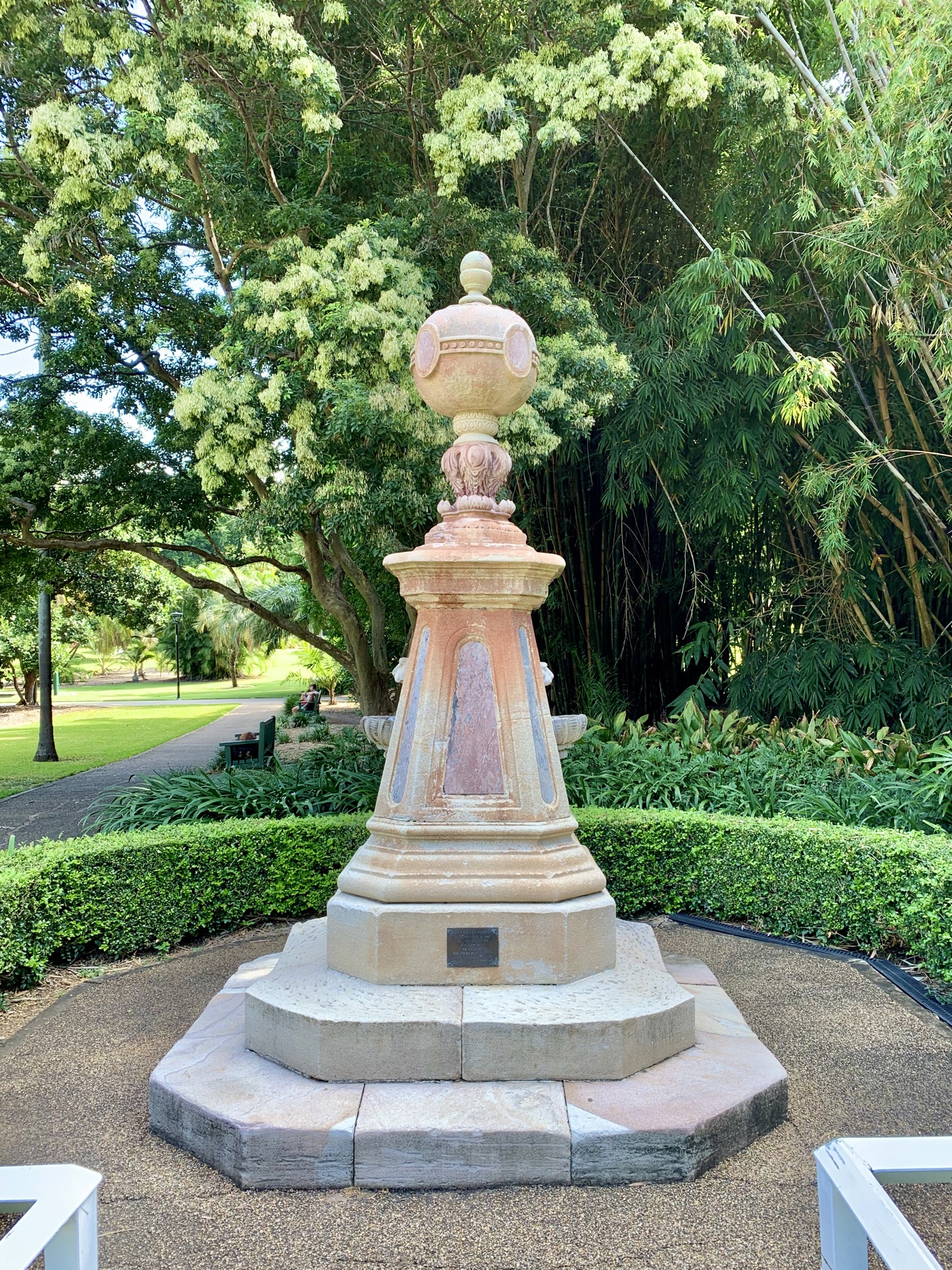
Walter Hill Fountain, 2020

By 1866 Hill had succeeded in having the extent of the Botanic Gardens enlarged to approximately 27 acres (11 ha). A 10-acre (4.0 ha) strip along Alice Street was not part of the Gardens but served as a park and sporting field known as Queen's Park. Early building work in the area included a Superintendent's cottage in the late 1850s, a platform for a battery of cannon in the early 1860s, a stone and iron fence around Queen's Park in 1865–66 [utilising stone from the old gaol on Petrie Terrace], and a drinking fountain in 1867. The fountain, designed by Colonial Architect Charles Tiffin, was erected only a year after reticulated water from the Enoggera reservoir was introduced to Brisbane. It later became known as the Walter Hill fountain.

A row of figs were planted in the 1870s. Hill also planted avenues of bunya pines and Cook pines.

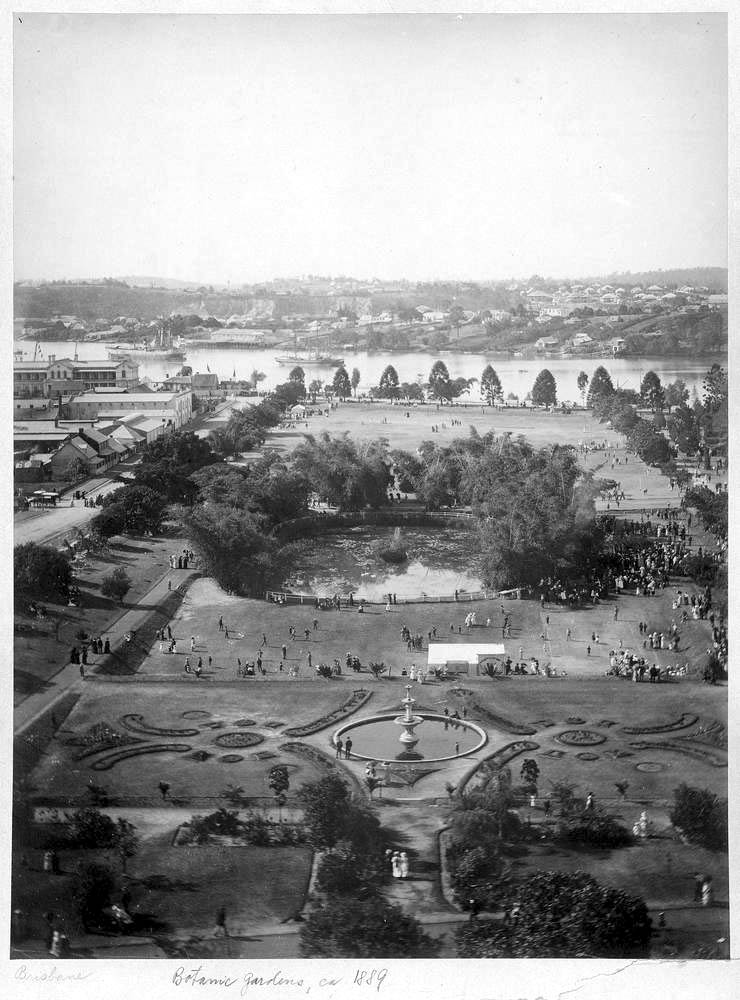
Queen's Park in the 1880s

Scientific activity was complemented by public recreational use of the Gardens, along with the Domain (on the southern boundary of the Gardens) and Queen's Park. By the 1880s, some of the scientific work previously performed by the Botanic Gardens was being carried out by the Queensland Acclimatisation Society at Bowen Park. The Herbarium and Botanic Library were moved from the Gardens for a period but were returned in 1905 when John Frederick Bailey was appointed Curator of the Botanic Gardens.

Underground electricity supply was installed in 1907.

Extensive dredging of Gardens Point in 1915 removed about 9 acres (3.6 ha) from the Domain (the southern side of Gardens Point) and Botanic Gardens but in the following year the amalgamation of the Gardens, Queens Park and part of the Domain resulted in a new Botanic Gardens of about 50 acres (20 ha).

The extant City Botanic Gardens was formed by the amalgamation of the original Botanic Gardens with the Domain (the southern side of Gardens Point) and Queen's Park in 1916, bringing its total area to around 20 hectares (49 acres); Queen's Park comprised a 10-acre (4.0 ha) strip along Alice Street, which originally served as a park and a sporting field, where regular cricket and football matches were held. The former curator's cottage built for John Frederick Bailey, curator from 1905–1917, is now a cafe.

The City of Brisbane Act of 1924 transferred responsibility for the Botanic Gardens to the Brisbane City Council, but the Herbarium remained as part of the Queensland Department of Agriculture and Stock.

Due to the proximity to the river, the Botanic Gardens have been flooded nine times between 1870–2011. With many plants being washed away, the Brisbane City Council established a new botanic gardens at Mount Coot-tha. Since the opening of the Mount Coot-tha Botanic Gardens in the mid 1970s, the Brisbane Botanic Gardens has become principally a recreational venue. Re-development of the Gardens in the late 1980s saw the introduction of new recreational structures and restoration work on the former Queen's Park fence.

The Gardens were also the home for over 100 years for Harriet, a tortoise reportedly collected by Charles Darwin during his visit to the Galápagos Islands in 1835 and donated to the Gardens in 1860 by John Clements Wickham, former commander of HMS Beagle and later Government Resident for Moreton Bay. Harriet was named in honour of Harry Oakman, curator of the Gardens from 1945 to 1962 and the creator of the (now disbanded) zoo at the Gardens. The zoo at one time housed more than 400 animal species. From about 1925 it was increasingly under scrutiny for poor animal welfare conditions and unsustainable costs, and was closed in 1958. Harriet lived out her final years at Australia Zoo until dying in June 2006.

== Description ==
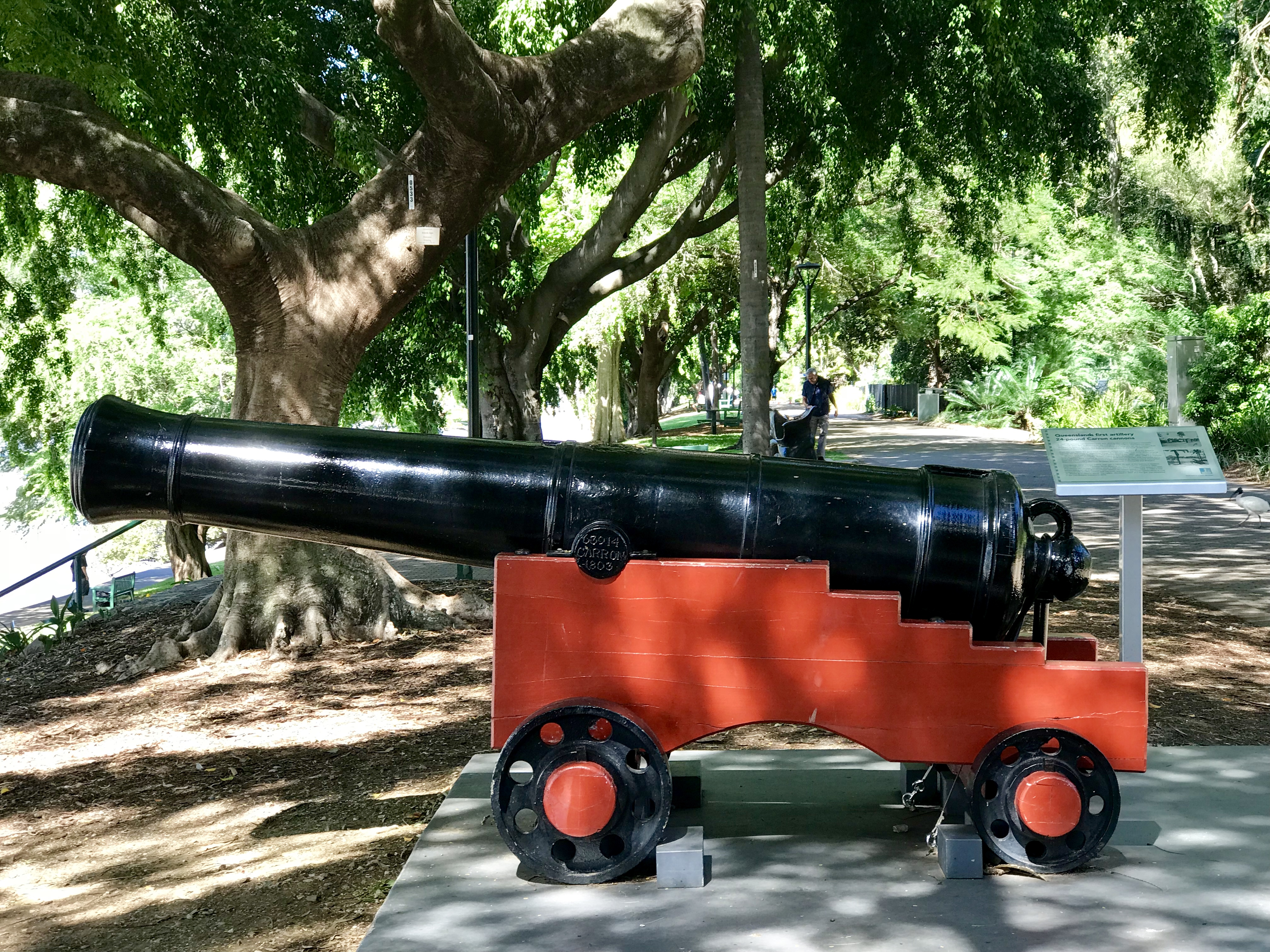
Cannon used as part of the colony's defence, cast in 1803

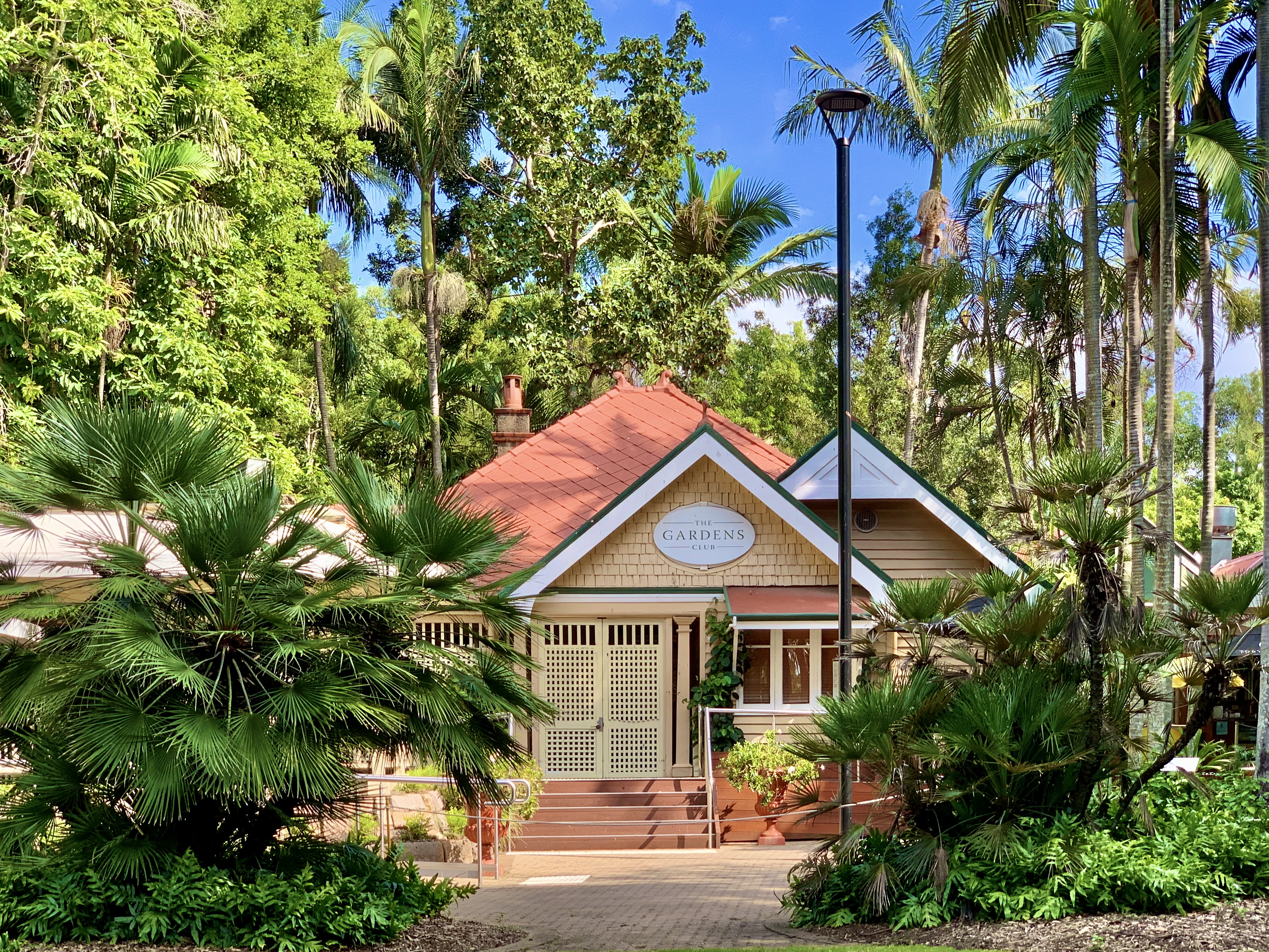
Curator's house (now cafe), 2020

The Brisbane Botanic Gardens, occupying 20 hectares (49 acres), is bounded by George and Alice Streets and the Brisbane river. They comprise three major sections: the former Queen's Park along Alice Street, the Botanic Gardens proper (adjacent to the river), and the former Government Domain at the rear of the Queensland University of Technology (formerly part of the grounds to Old Government House).

The gardens house a collection of approximately 600 plant species. Set in undulating grounds, the gardens are bordered by mature shade trees which also create avenues and groves. A lake and formal lawns, gardens and structures provide a diversity of passive recreational activities. A series of interconnecting paths link a riverside concourse with other perimeter paths.

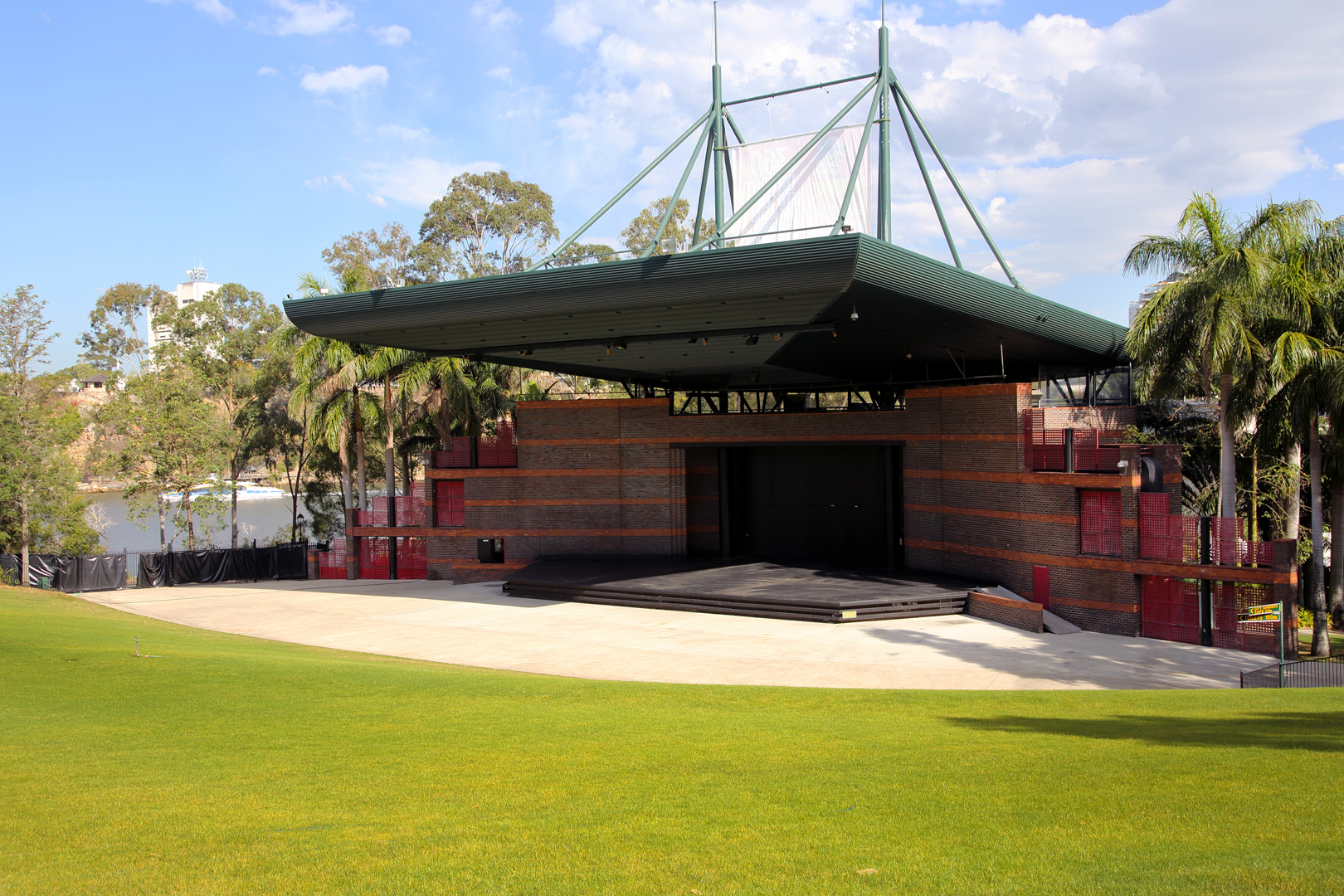
Riverstage, 2014

The gardens contain an avenue of bunya pines (Araucaria bidwilli) planted in the 1850s and an avenue of weeping figs (Ficus benjamina) planted in the 1870s. It also contains a number of other rare plants, particularly palms and figs – some in formal planting arrangements within the lawns, others within mass planted gardens – and an avenue of Cook pines (Araucaria columnaris formerly A. cookii).

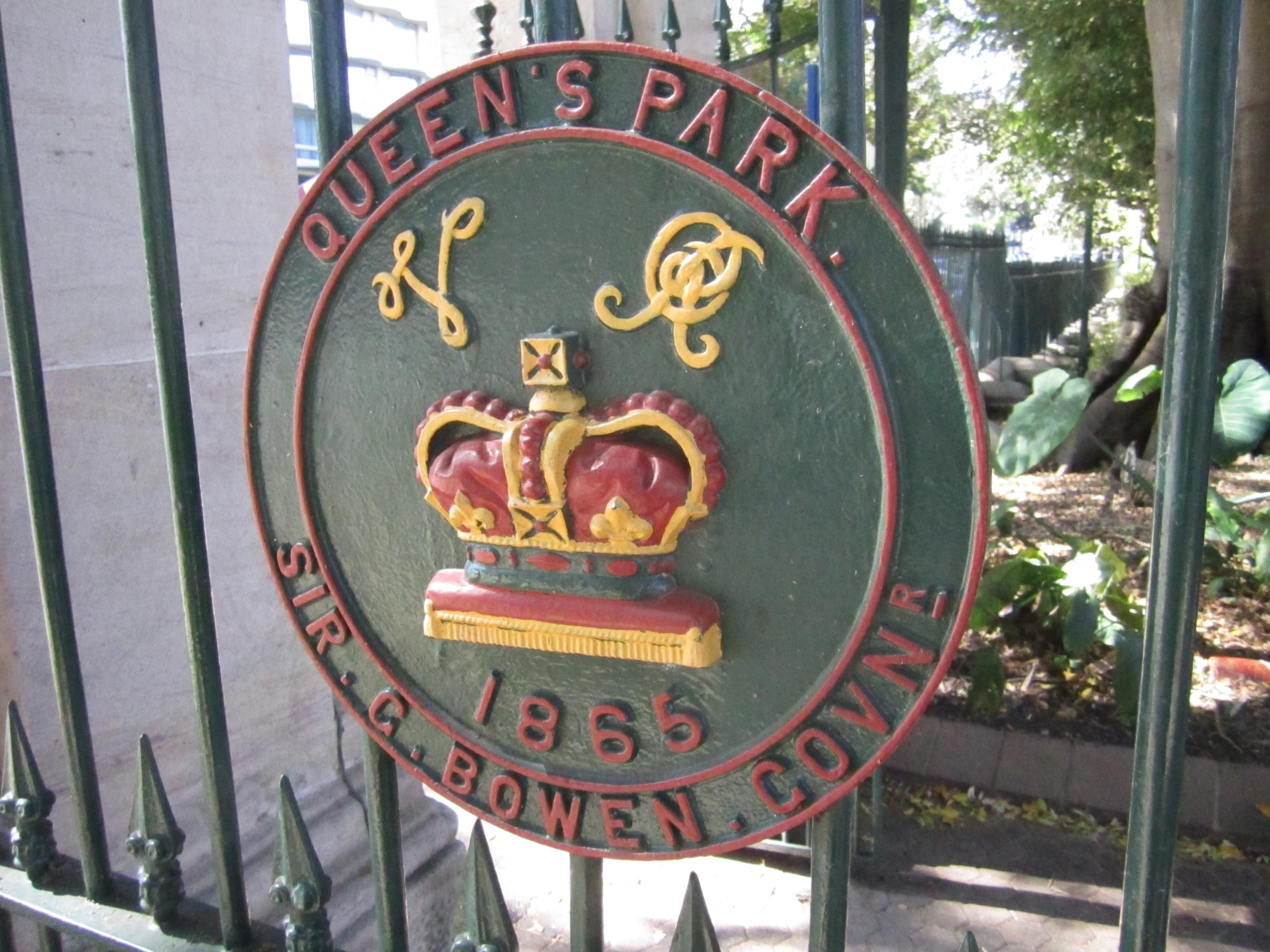
Queen's Park gate logo from 1865, as seen in 2012

A low stone wall (1860s) surmounted by an iron railing fence runs the length of Alice Street and extends into George Street. Large iron gates provide entry at George, Albert and Edward Streets. A cottage c. 1900s, with Arts and Crafts decorative elements, is located at the southern end of the gardens on a hill known as Residence Hill. This building is surrounded by trees and shrubs, some of which are survivors of late 1850s and early 1860s plantings. The City Gardens Cafe operated from the house for many years; in 2016 it is operated as The Garden Club.

In a hollow to the north of Residence Hill, is the Walter Hill fountain. It stands on a stepped octagonal base of three tiers. The body of the fountain continues this shape but tapers towards its top. The lion shaped drinking fountains, presently not functioning, and basins are of white marble in contrast with the freestone of the rest of the structure.

To the south of Residence Hill is a 1980s grassed amphitheatre known as Riverstage facing a stage beside the river. Other structures for public convenience and recreational use are dispersed throughout the gardens.

== Access and facilities ==
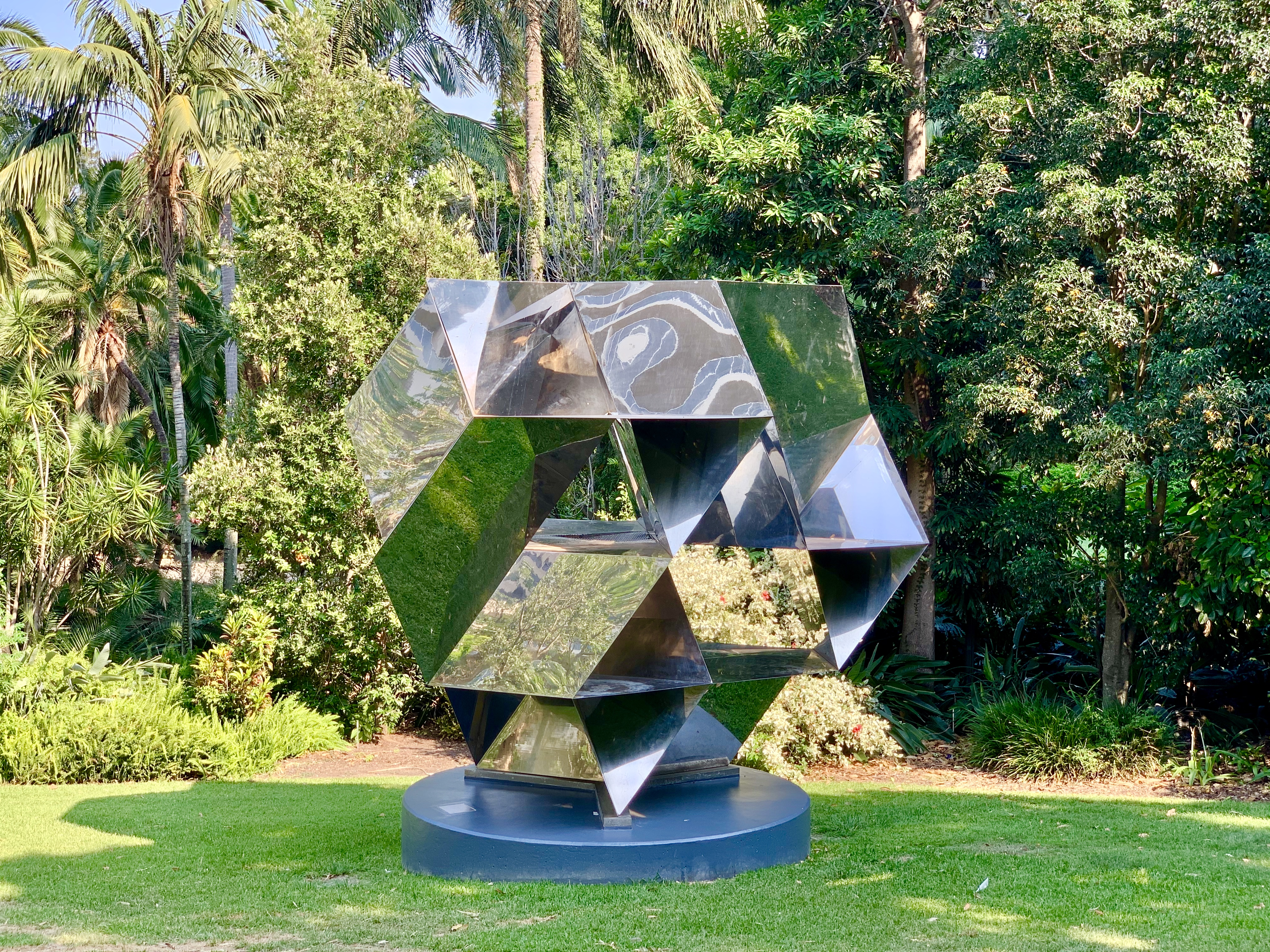
Morning Star II by Jon Barlow Hudson

The Gardens are accessible by Alice Street, the Goodwill Bridge and Brisbane City Council's ferries and CityCats at the Gardens Point and Eagle St wharves. The gardens are open 24 hours, with pathways lit at night.

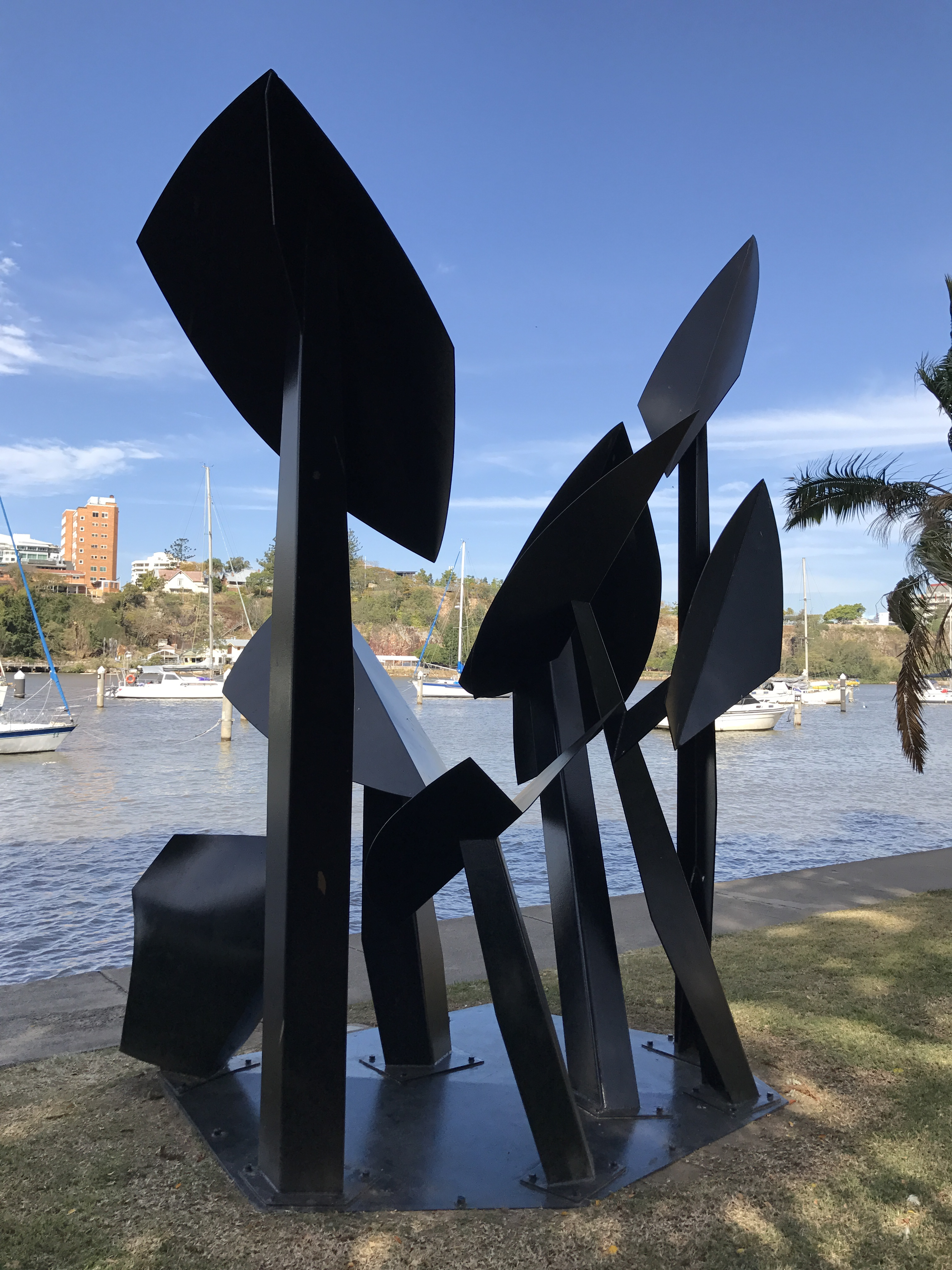
Plant form by Robert Juniper

Features of the Gardens include:

- Gardens Cycle Hire station at Albert Street entrance
- Morning Star II by Jon Barlow Hudson (from World Expo 88)
- Plant form by Robert Juniper

== Heritage listing ==
Brisbane Botanic Gardens was listed on the Queensland Heritage Register on 3 February 1997 having satisfied the following criteria.

The place is important in demonstrating the evolution or pattern of Queensland's history.

The Brisbane Botanic Gardens are historically important as the most significant, non-Aboriginal cultural landscape in Queensland, having a continuous horticultural history since 1828, without any significant loss of land area or change in use over that time. It remains the premier public park and recreational facility for the capital of Queensland, which role it has performed since the early 1840s.

The place demonstrates rare, uncommon or endangered aspects of Queensland's cultural heritage.

Plant collections date to the 1850s, many having been planted by Walter Hill, the first Director of the Botanic Gardens. Many of the specimens are either rare in cultivation or of great maturity or both. Many important plant introductions to Queensland, of both an agricultural and ornamental nature, can be traced directly to the Brisbane Botanic Gardens and the work of its early curators.

The place is important in demonstrating the principal characteristics of a particular class of cultural places.

These gardens are important in demonstrating the principal characteristics of an evolving public and botanical garden dating from the mid-19th century, containing the most extensive mature gardens in Queensland. There are a number of historic structures in the gardens, including the Walter Hill Drinking Fountain (1867), the former band pavilion (1878), the boundary stone walls, gates and cast iron railings (1865–85), the former bear pit shelter (1905), the former curator's residence (1909) [now the kiosk], the riverwall from Edward Street to the Domain (1918), the southern stone staircase on the riverbank (1918–19) and the middle and northern stone staircases (both 1923–24). The place also contains a number of historically significant early engineering projects, including the stormwater drainage system (1865 onwards), reticulated water supply from Enoggera Dam (1867) and underground electricity supply for lighting purposes (1907).

The place is important because of its aesthetic significance.

The Brisbane Botanic Gardens are significant as a Brisbane landmark and for their visual amenity and natural wildlife values as the major verdant landscaped area in the city's central business district.

The place has a strong or special association with a particular community or cultural group for social, cultural or spiritual reasons.

Many important social events have taken place within the gardens, and the place is generally held in high regard by the local community and is a popular destination for visitors to Brisbane.

The place has a special association with the life or work of a particular person, group or organisation of importance in Queensland's history.

The place has a special association with the pioneering work of curators Walter Hill (1855–81), Philip John MacMahon (1889–1905), John Frederick Bailey (1905–1917) and Ernest Walter Bick (1917–1939).

== See also ==
- Parks and gardens of Brisbane
