= Britannia Foundry =

Heritage-listed building in Brisbane, Queensland

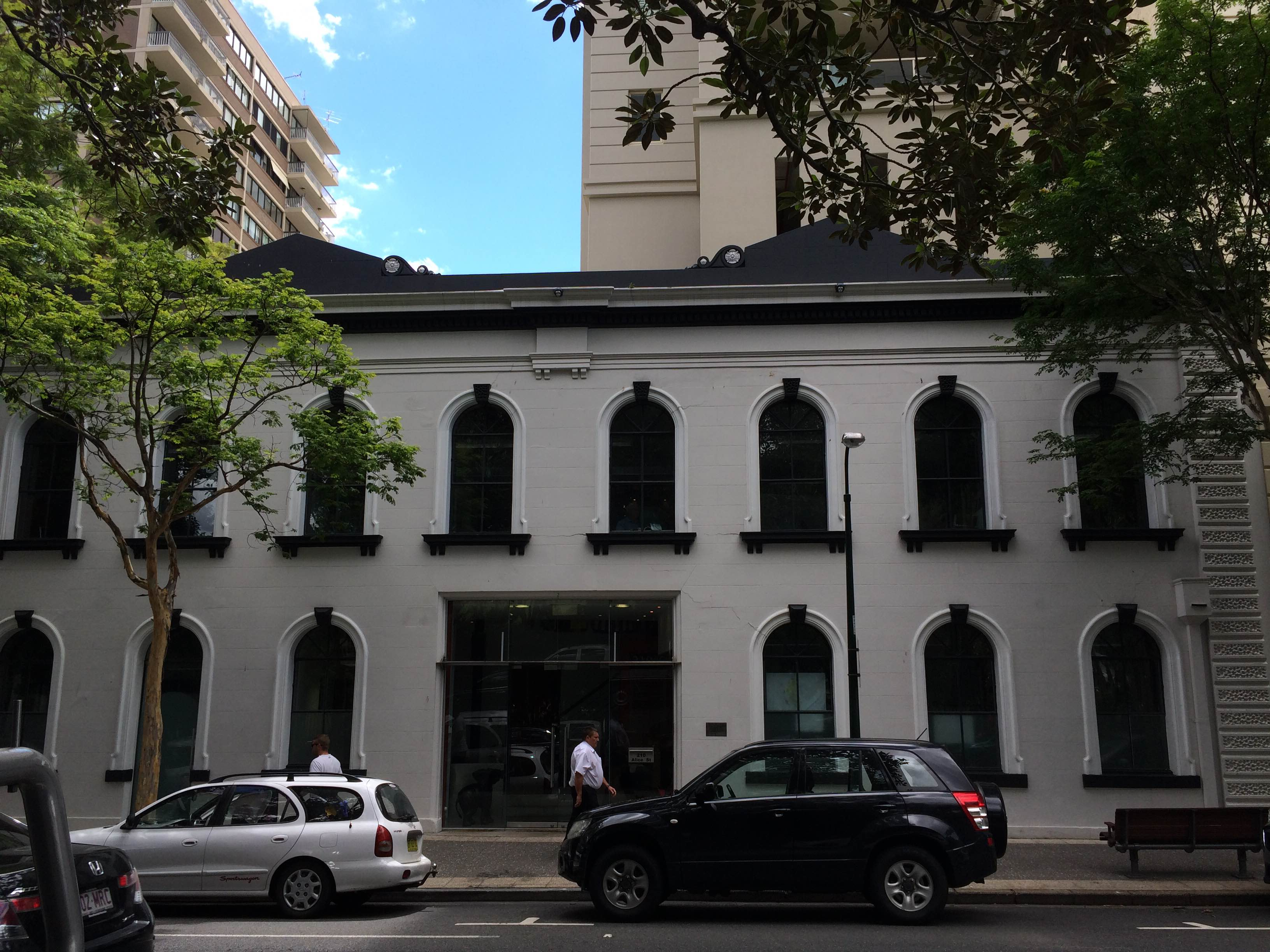
- Britannia Foundry, 2015

- Location within Queensland Location within Australia
- 27.4724°S 153.0301°E
- Location: 210 Alice Street, Brisbane City, City of Brisbane, Queensland, Australia

History
- Design period: 1870s–1890s (late 19th century)
- Built: c. 1887

Queensland Heritage Register
- Official name: Public Works Depot, Britannia Foundry, Smellie & Co Warehouse
- Type: state heritage (built)
- Designated: 21 October 1992
- Reference no.: 600068
- Significant period: 1880s (fabric); 1880s–1940s (historical)

Britannia Foundry is a heritage-listed converted foundry at 210 Alice Street, Brisbane City, City of Brisbane, Queensland, Australia. It was built c. 1887. It is also known as Smellie & Co Warehouse and Public Works Depot. It was added to the Queensland Heritage Register on 21 October 1992.

== History ==
This building was constructed c. 1887 for the engineering and iron founding firm of Harvey Sargeant & Co., which was founded in 1880 and was part of the fledgling heavy engineering industry in Queensland. It produced ironworks, brick making machinery, girders, and agricultural machinery. The ironworks necessary for much of the building boom carried out in Brisbane in the 1880s were supplied by Harvey, Sargeant, & Co.

In 1885 the company purchased a site in Alice Street for a foundry and a building was erected c. 1887. Called the Britannia Foundry, it was one of several foundries in the street, including Smellie & Co, and Smith, Forrester & Co, who operated the Queensland Ironworks.

Harvey, Sargeant & Co went into insolvency in 1892, but a new company was formed to continue operating the foundry. In 1903 the business moved to new premises in Alice Street. The firm remained in this part of the city until 1966 when it moved to Sherwood, where it traded under the name of ANI-Sargeant for many years, celebrating its centenary in 1981.

In 1909 the property was purchased by Smellie & Co, a firm which imported machinery and farming equipment, for use as a warehouse. Smellie's owned adjacent properties in Alice and Edward Streets (Old Mineral House and Smellie's Building). In 1945, Smellie & Co sold the building, along with its other properties to the Queensland Government. The Department of Public Works has used this building as a workshop, and more recently for storage.

The building was subsequently sold by the department and is now used as commercial offices.

== Description ==
This two-storeyed building, situated in Alice Street, is of brick construction with a rendered facade and a galvanised iron roof.

The facade has semi-circular arched windows on both levels. There are eight openings on the upper level and three to each side of a central square carriage way on the lower level. All the arched openings have moulded architraves, sills, and ornamented keystones. An opening on the ground floor has been converted to a doorway. A pilaster of vermiculated quoins runs down the northern end of the facade. A frieze and dentilled cornice extend across the building and are surmounted by two simple triangular pediments with scroll-like brackets to each side.

The rear elevation had a circular opening and four rectangular ones, all of which have been blocked up. A steel escape stair and aluminium framed glazed doors have been inserted on the exposed side of the building facing the yard.

The interior of the building has been altered but still shows evidence of its original construction and use. Some cast-iron columns incorporating brackets remain at the front of the building on the ground floor. The timber trusses of the two gable roofs are exposed on the upper level.

== Heritage listing ==
Britannia Foundry was listed on the Queensland Heritage Register on 21 October 1992 having satisfied the following criteria.

The place is important in demonstrating the evolution or pattern of Queensland's history.

The building also provides evidence of engineering and foundry works which previously were a major activity in the Alice Street area.

The place is important in demonstrating the principal characteristics of a particular class of cultural places.

The building is significant as an example of an intact 1880s industrial building with a decorative facade.

The place is important because of its aesthetic significance.

The building is significant for its contribution to the Alice Street streetscape along with neighbouring Old Mineral House.

== See also ==
Other Smellie & Co buildings:

- Smellie's Building, Edward Street
- Old Mineral House, corner Edward and Alice Streets
