= Parliament House, Brisbane =

Queensland Parliament meeting place

Coordinates: 27.475356°S 153.02703°E

Parliament House
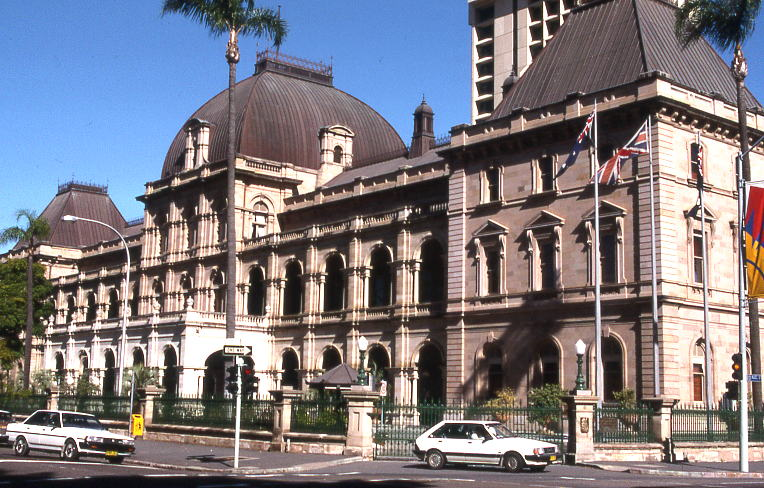
- Parliament House with the 1970s brutalist-style Parliamentary Annexe in the background

General information
- Architectural style: French Renaissance Revival
- Location: Gardens Point, Brisbane, Cnr George Street and Alice Street, Brisbane City, Queensland
- Construction started: 14 July 1865; 161 years ago
- Completed: November 1868 (Note: majority of works completed.); 1879 (Note: arcades completed); June 1891 (Note: Alice Street wing completed); September 1982 (Note: porte cochere added during renovations, completing Tiffin's original design)
- Opened: 4 August 1868; 158 years ago
- Cost: £61,500 (George St wing); £38,700 (Alice St wing)
- Owner: Queensland Government

Technical details
- Material: Woogaroo sandstone

Design and construction
- Architect: Charles Tiffin

Website
- www.parliament.qld.gov.au

Parliament House in Brisbane is the meeting place of the Parliament of Queensland, housing its only chamber, the Legislative Assembly. It is located on the corner of George Street and Alice Street at Gardens Point in the CBD, and is next to the Queensland University of Technology and City Botanic Gardens. It was listed on the Queensland Heritage Register on 21 October 1992.

== History ==
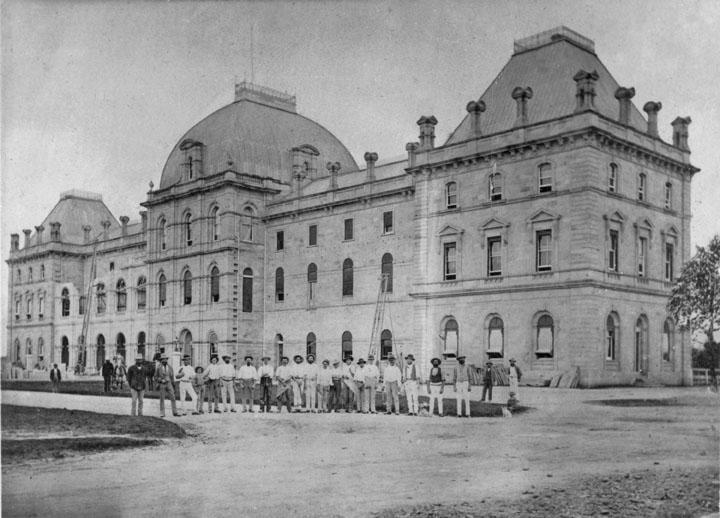
Parliament House during construction of balconies c. 1878.

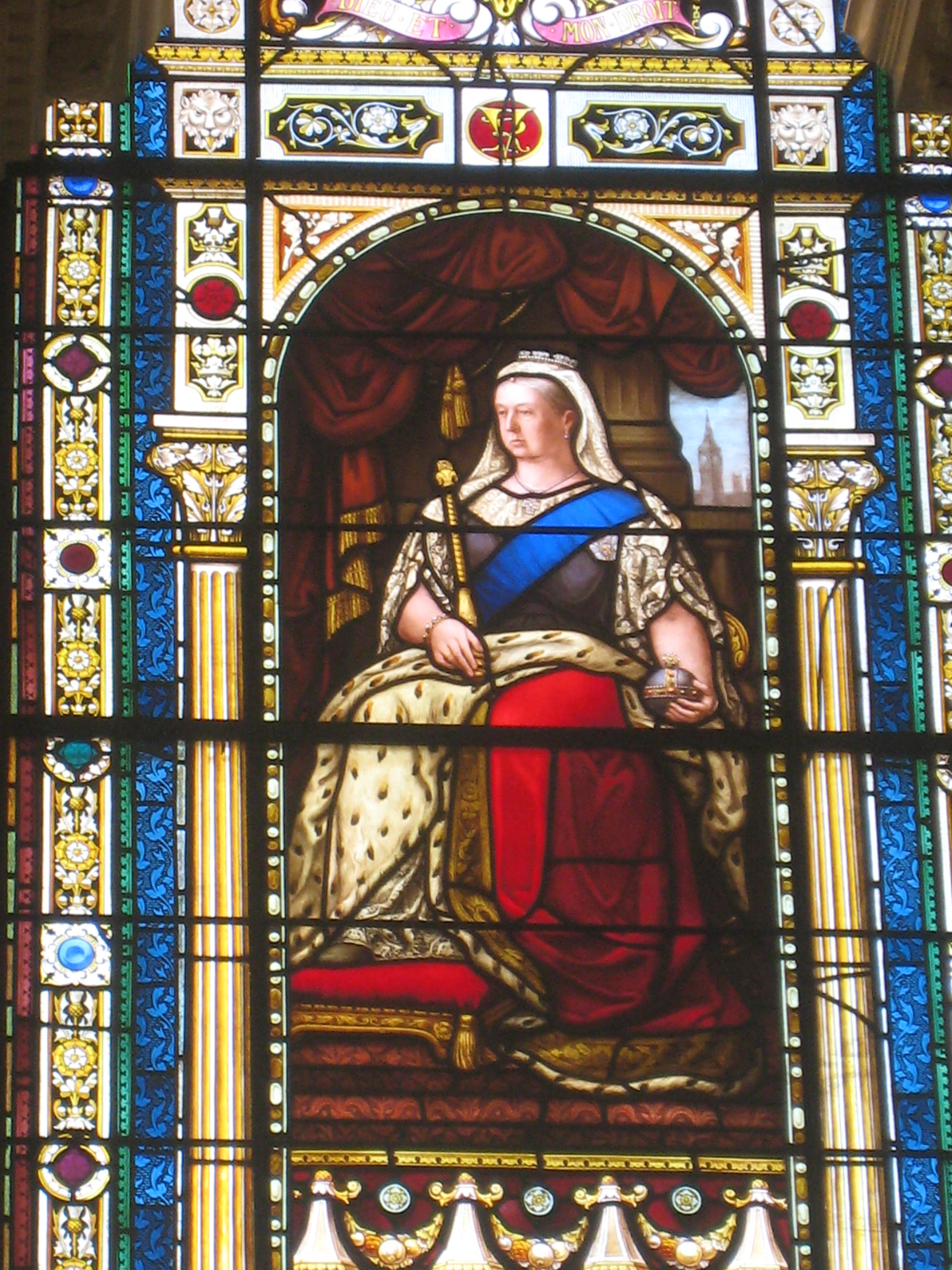
Queen Victoria stained glass window

=== Planning ===
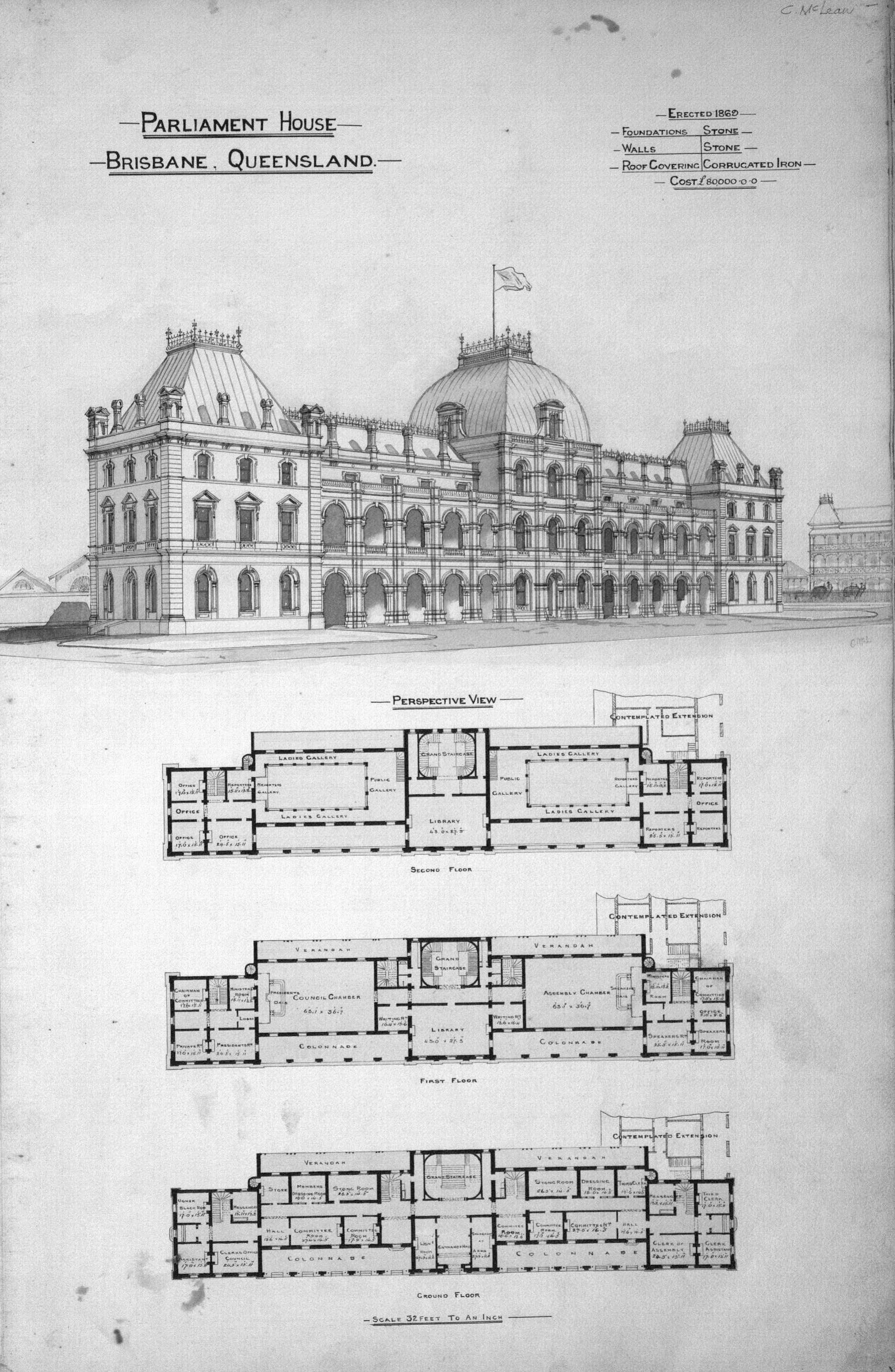
Plan of Parliament House, circa 1867

The Parliament of Queensland first met on 22 May 1860 in the former convict barracks on Queen Street. The building was not considered a suitable meeting place for Parliament in the long-term, but the government was preoccupied with the construction of Government House, and plans for a new legislative facility were not made until after its completion. In November 1863 a commission chose the site for the new parliamentary building on the corner of Alice and George Street. The commission soon opened an Australia-wide competition for the new building's design, and offered a 200 guinea prize for the winning submission. In April 1864, a design by Benjamin Backhouse was selected, but was later rejected after it was estimated that it would require £38,000 to construct, exceeding the maximum cost of £20,000 specified in the competition. In October 1864, a design by William Henry Ellerker was recommended by the Parliamentary Commissioners. However, in November 1865, the commissioners withdrew their recommendation and resigned, following criticism by James Cowlishaw who claimed none of the submissions was satisfactory. In December 1864, Ellerker wrote a public complaint about the process, but ultimately plans by Charles Tiffin, the Queensland Colonial Architect, were selected. Amid controversy and allegations of undue influence on the outcome of the competition, Tiffin donated his prize money for the design to the Ipswich Grammar School.

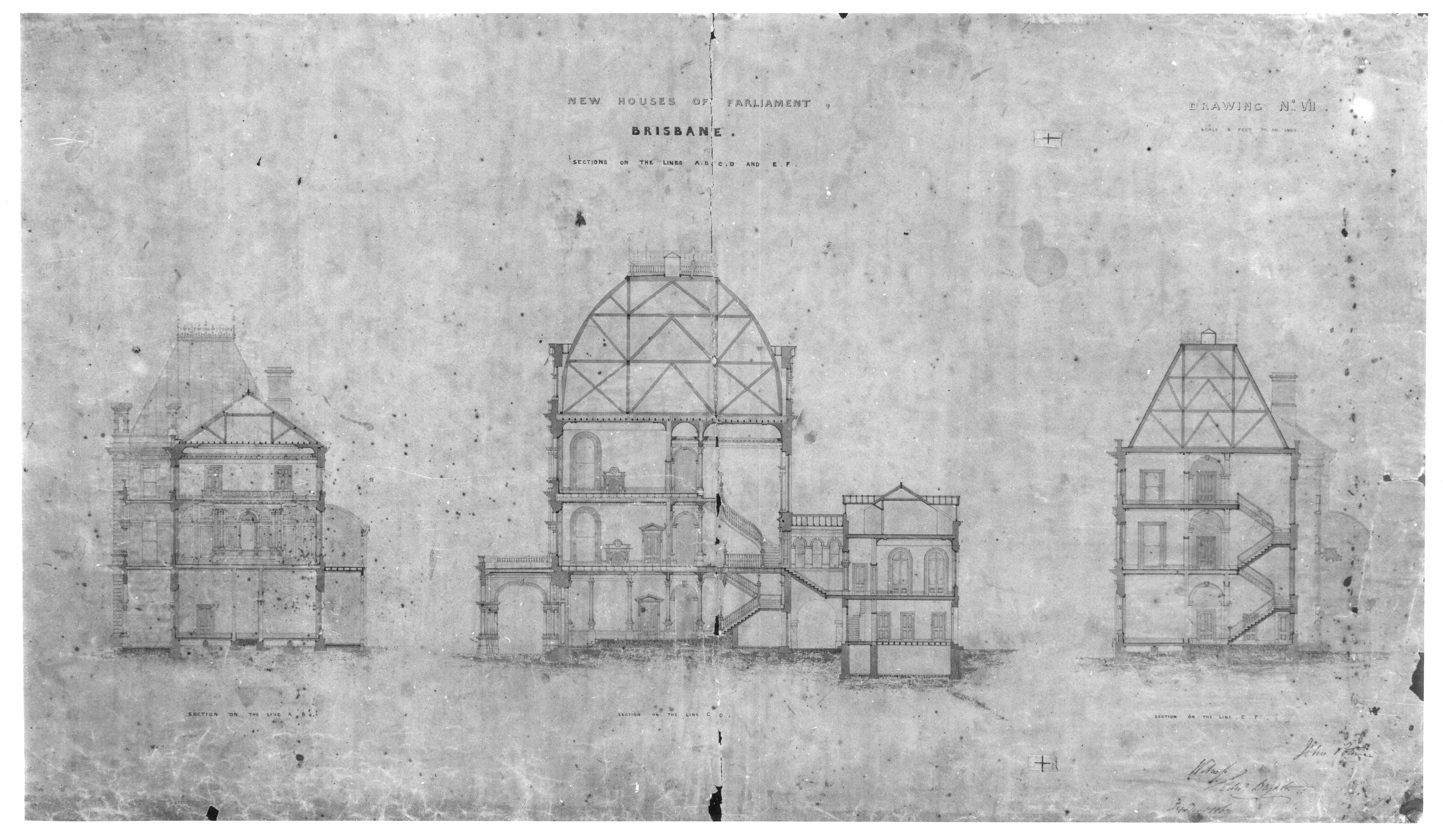
Plan of Parliament House, 1867

=== Construction ===
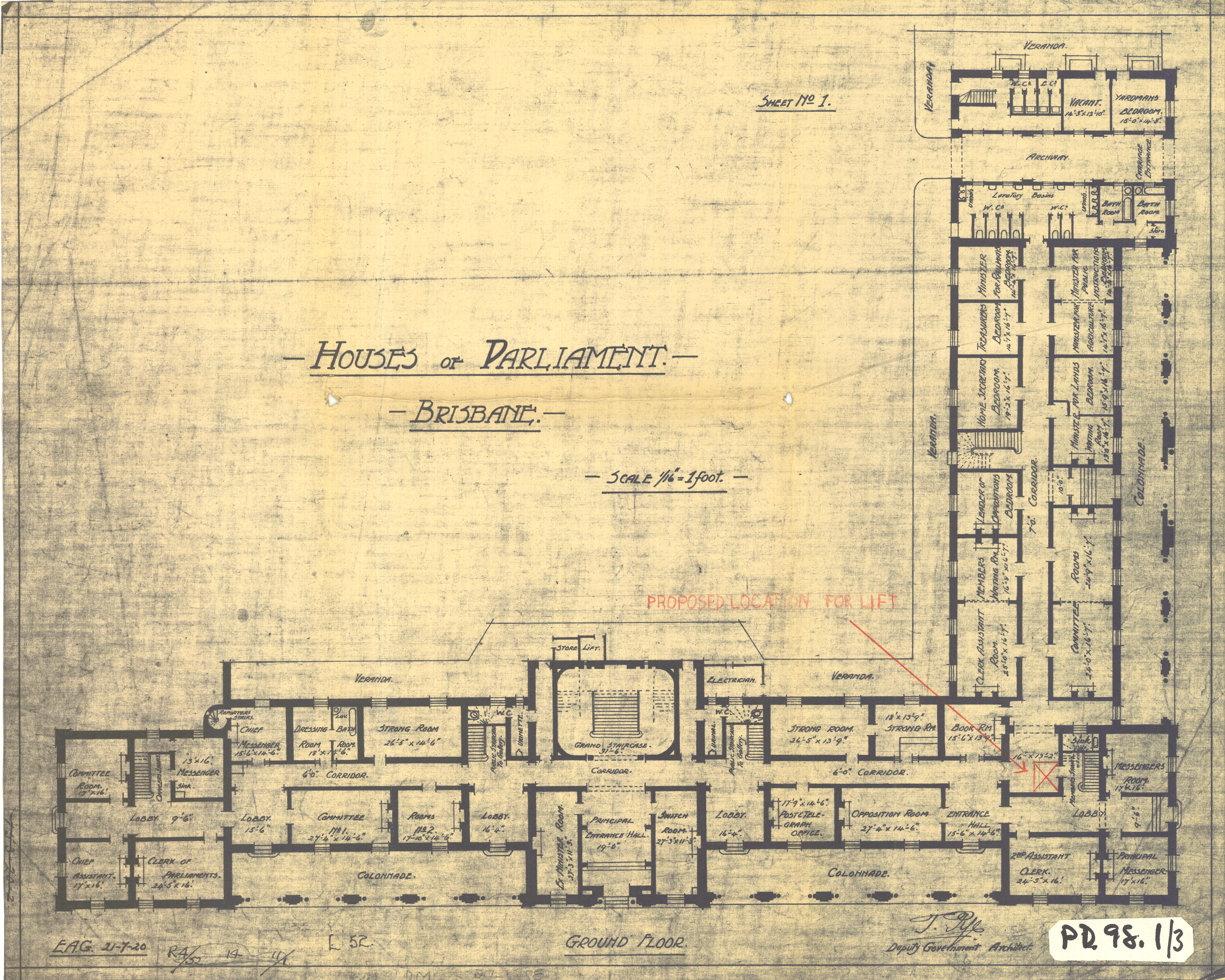
Ground floor plan, 1920

On 14 July 1865 the foundation stone for the building was laid by Sir George Bowen. It was built by Joshua Jeays who used sandstone from his own quarries. Stained glass windows depicting royalty were imported from Birmingham. The first section was completed in 1867. The George Street frontage was completed in 1868 in French Renaissance Revival style, with some Second Empire-style elements. The archways and colonnades facing George Street were built in 1878, and construction on the Alice Street frontage commenced in 1887. The Alice Street wing was completed in 1889.

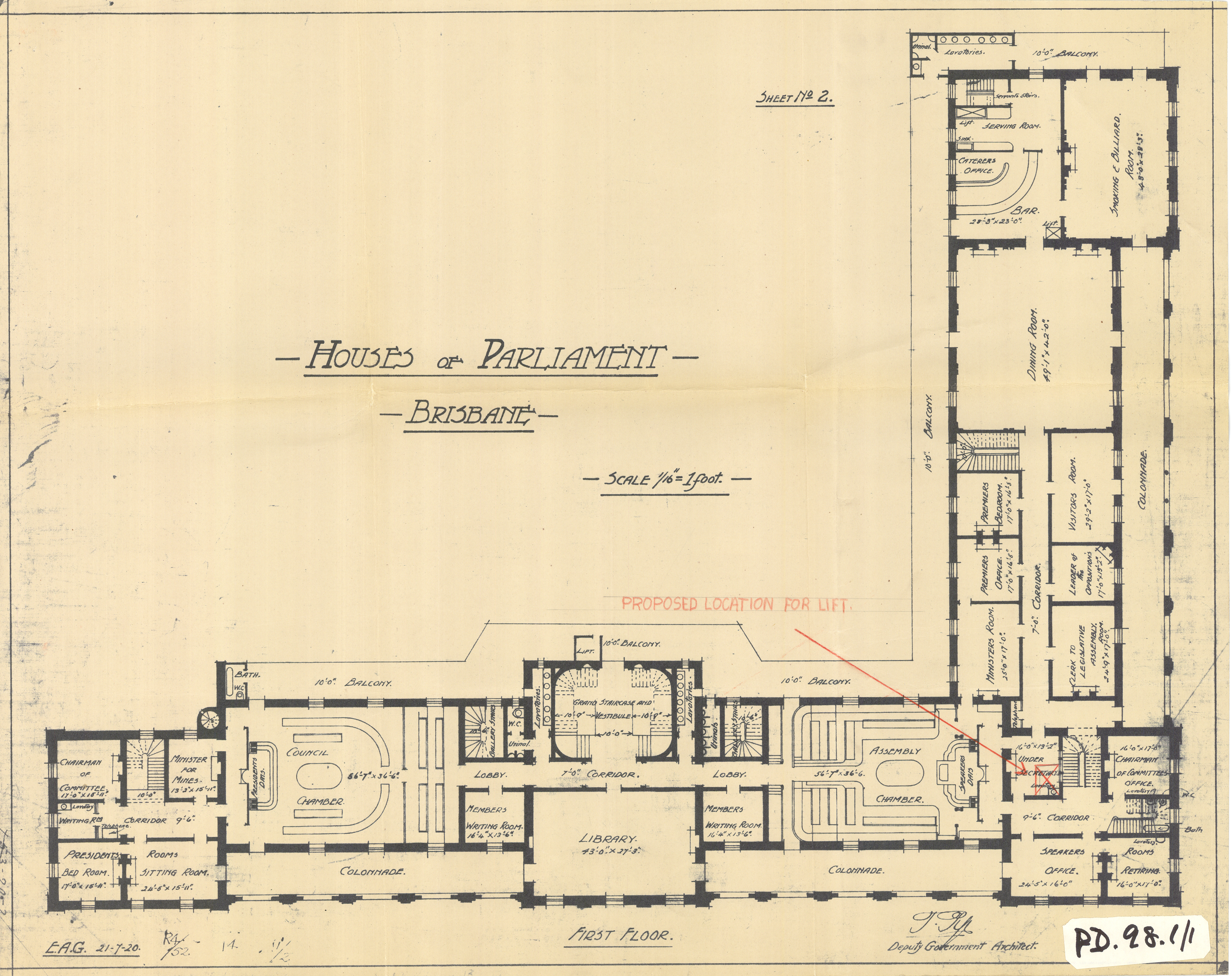
First floor, 1920

In 1886 Parliament House was connected to the Government Printing Office via an underground cable which provided it with electricity. The building was the first parliament house in Australia to be electrified.

=== 20th century ===
Prince Alfred visited Parliament House in 1922 and on 29 February 1922 planted two trees at the entrance.

In March 1939, the Speaker of the Legislative Assembly George Pollock committed suicide at his office in Parliament House by shooting himself with a shotgun.

Led by George Gray, in August 1939 members of the League for Social Justice marched on Parliament House to protest unemployment, "armed with batons, coils of barbed wire and hammers". They interrupted a meeting of the ALP caucus in the old Legislative Council chambers. Gray and 36 others were charged with unlawful assembly, but were acquitted by a sympathetic jury.

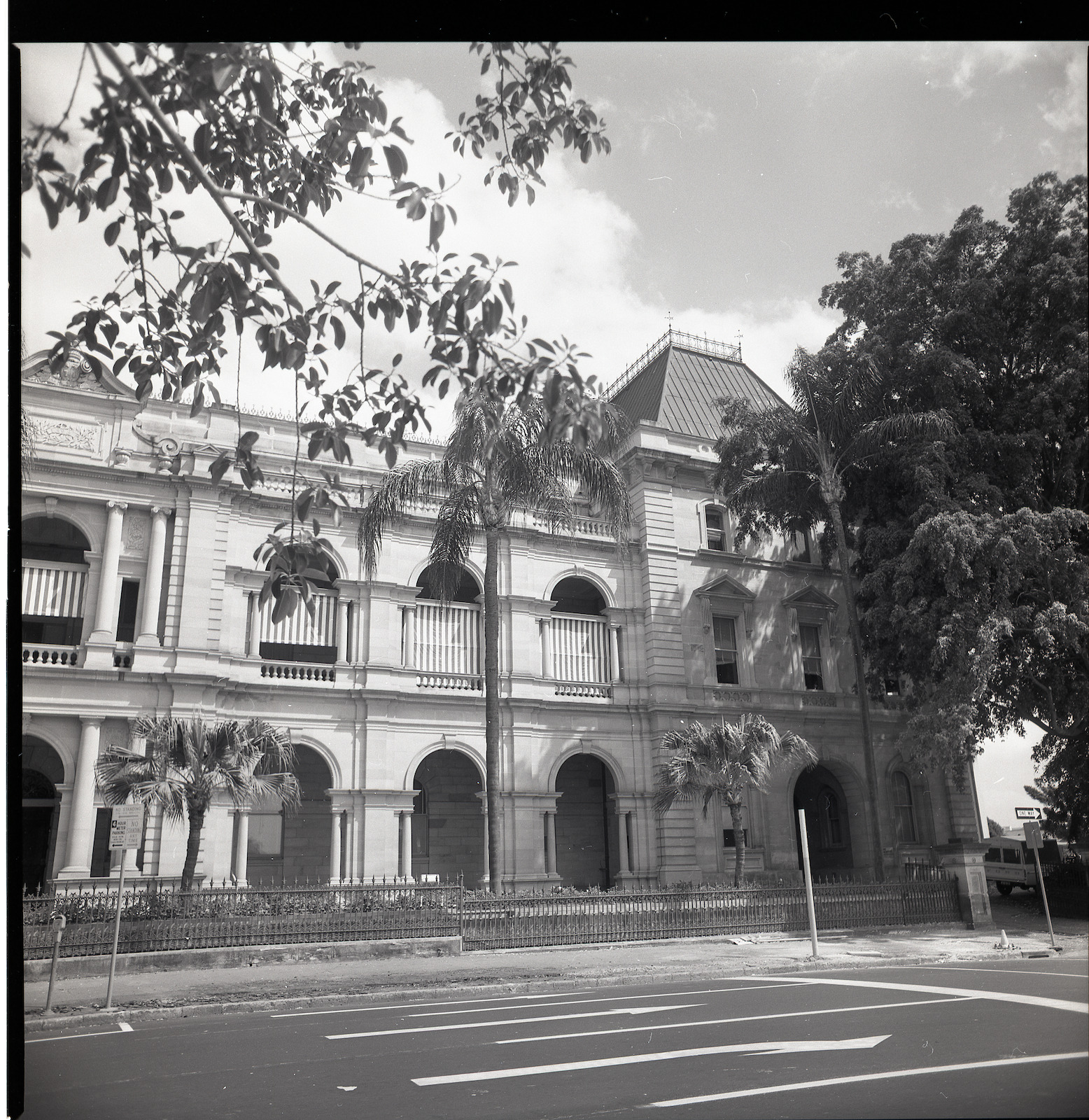
Parliament House, Alice Street, Brisbane, 1973

In 1969 the Government began to investigate the feasibility and cost of an extension to Parliament House. Three years later the State Works Department and Parliamentary Buildings Committee began planning the building, and designed a brutalist extension called the Parliamentary Annexe. Tenders for the Annexe were called in August 1975, and construction began soon after.

The Annexe was completed in March 1979 at a cost of $20,000,000. The building is linked to Parliament House, forming a square like the one in Tiffin's original 1864 plan. The square has become known as Speaker's Green and is used for ceremonial purposes. Alongside parliamentary and government offices, the Annexe also includes accommodation for regional MPs to stay in when in Brisbane. It previously also included a penthouse suite built for then premier Sir Joh Bjelke-Petersen with a Jacuzzi.

The Annexe underwent a refurbishment in 2000, and again from 2022 to 2024.

The Queensland Parliament first hoisted the Aboriginal flag—alongside the Torres Strait Islander flag, the Australian flag, and the Queensland flag on 22 May 2007. The flags were also introduced onto the floor of the Legislative Assembly chamber at the same time.

== Design ==
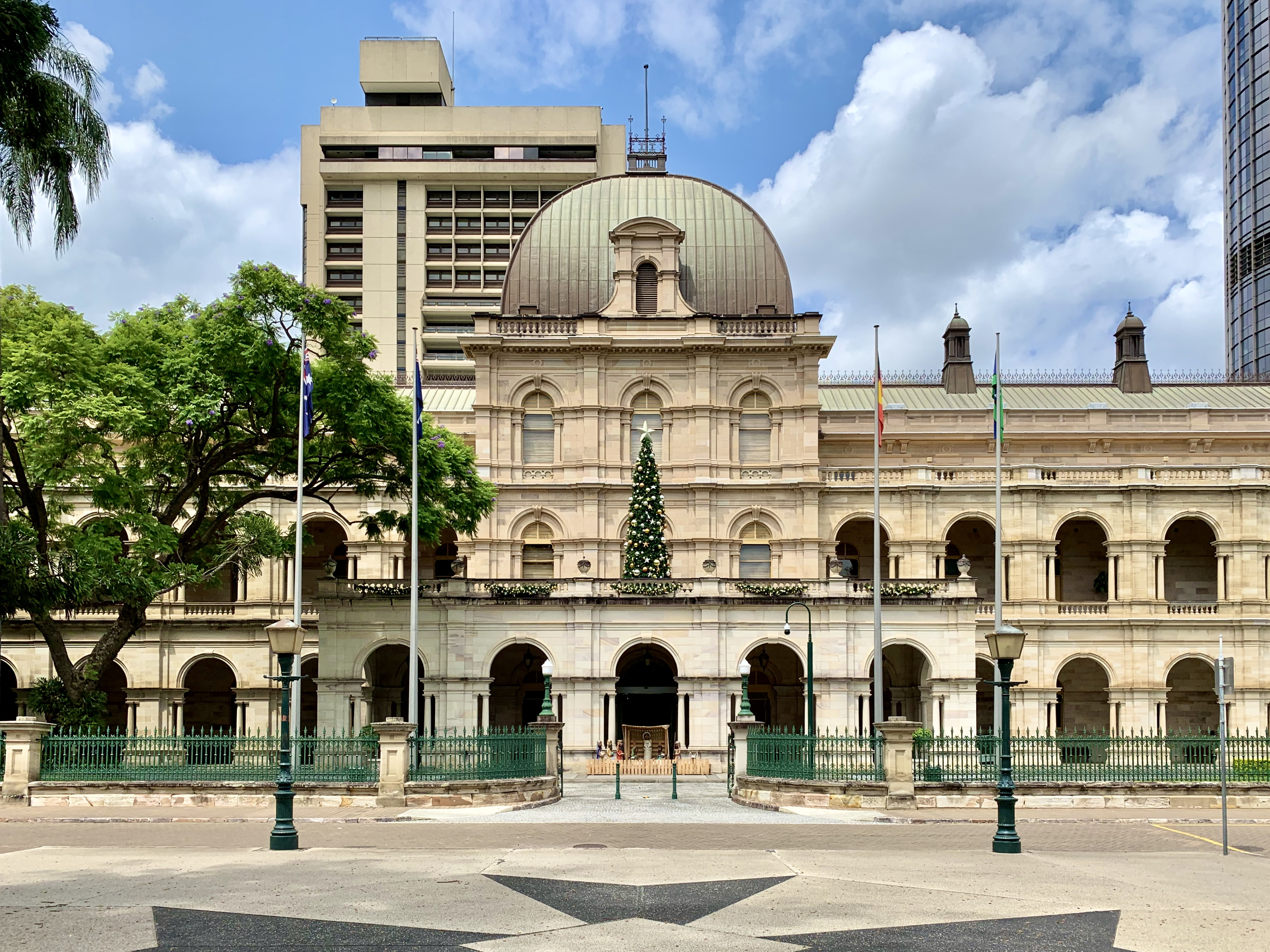
Parliament House in 2019

The George Street face of Parliament House has a porte-cochère, with a balustraded terrace above. The original zinc and galvanised iron roof was replaced in the 1980s with one constructed from sheet copper from Mount Isa.

== Public use ==
Art exhibitions and other displays are frequently staged in the spacious ground floor areas of the Annexe.

Free public guided tours of the Parliament are available each week day. Also, a gift shop, selling souvenirs and memorabilia, is located in the main foyer.

Parliament House was also used as one of the filming locations for the 1980s Australian series of Mission: Impossible, the 2022 TV series Joe vs. Carole and the 2024 Disney plus produced series Nautilus.

== See also ==
- History of Queensland
- Parliament House, Melbourne
- Parliament House, Canberra
