= Gardens Point, Brisbane =

Area in Brisbane, Queensland, Australia

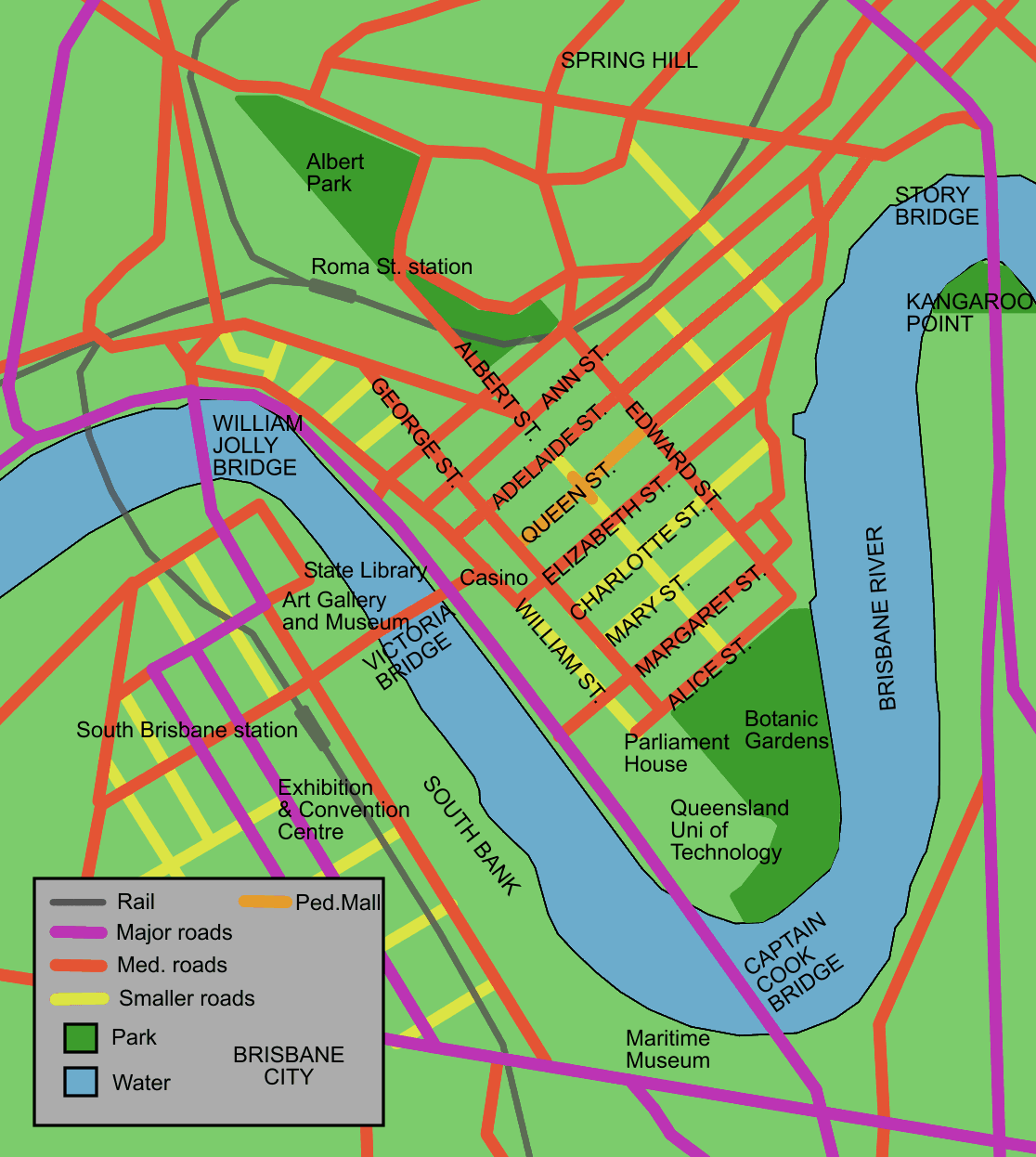
Gardens Point is the area south of Alice Street at the bend in the Brisbane River.

Gardens Point is the southernmost area of the peninsula that forms the central business district of Brisbane, Queensland, Australia. It is located immediately south of Alice Street and is bounded by the Brisbane River on its other three sides. Historically a convict farm that supplied a variety of food crops for the fledgling Moreton Bay penal settlement, Gardens Point would eventually become an experimental botanical reserve, and then gardens and parkland for the citizens of Brisbane. It is also a hub of politics and education, hosting important institutions such as the Parliament of Queensland and the chancellery and inner-city campus of the Queensland University of Technology. Frog's Hollow is a historic neighbourhood which lies immediately to the north of Gardens Point, and consists of the six or so city blocks bounded by Charlotte, Edward, Alice and George streets. It forms the lower part of the Brisbane CBD, which occupies the rest of the peninsula and some adjacent areas.

Today, Gardens Point is occupied by:

- the City Botanic Gardens, from which its name is derived
- the Riverstage
- Parliament House (Queensland)
- the Gardens Point campus of the Queensland University of Technology
- Old Government House

Mangroves grow on the southern and western banks of the point. The eastern bank along the botanic gardens contains a pedestrian promenade.

Gardens Point is connected to South Bank via the pedestrian and cyclist-only Goodwill Bridge, while the vehicle-only Captain Cook Bridge runs along the western bank of the point connecting the City and Woolloongabba. The Kangaroo Point Green Bridge links the CBD with Kangaroo Point, and is accessible from the northernmost end of the botanic gardens, opposite the intersection of Alice and Edward streets. The Kangaroo Point Bridge is restricted to pedestrians and cyclists, and features a café and restaurant at its cityside landing and an observation deck at its centre.

== Gallery ==
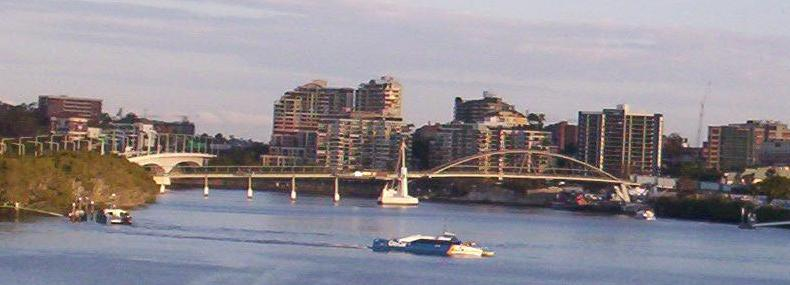
Goodwill Bridge, Brisbane

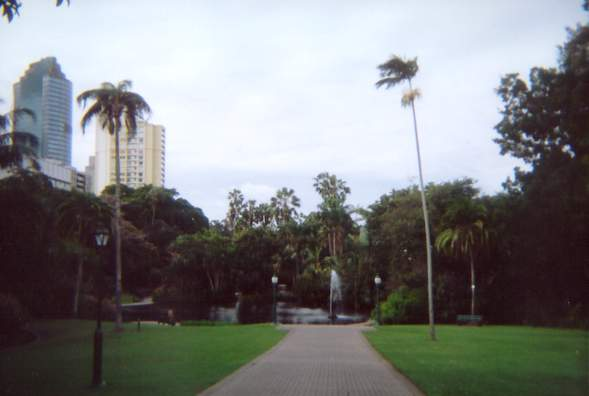
Brisbane City Botanic Gardens

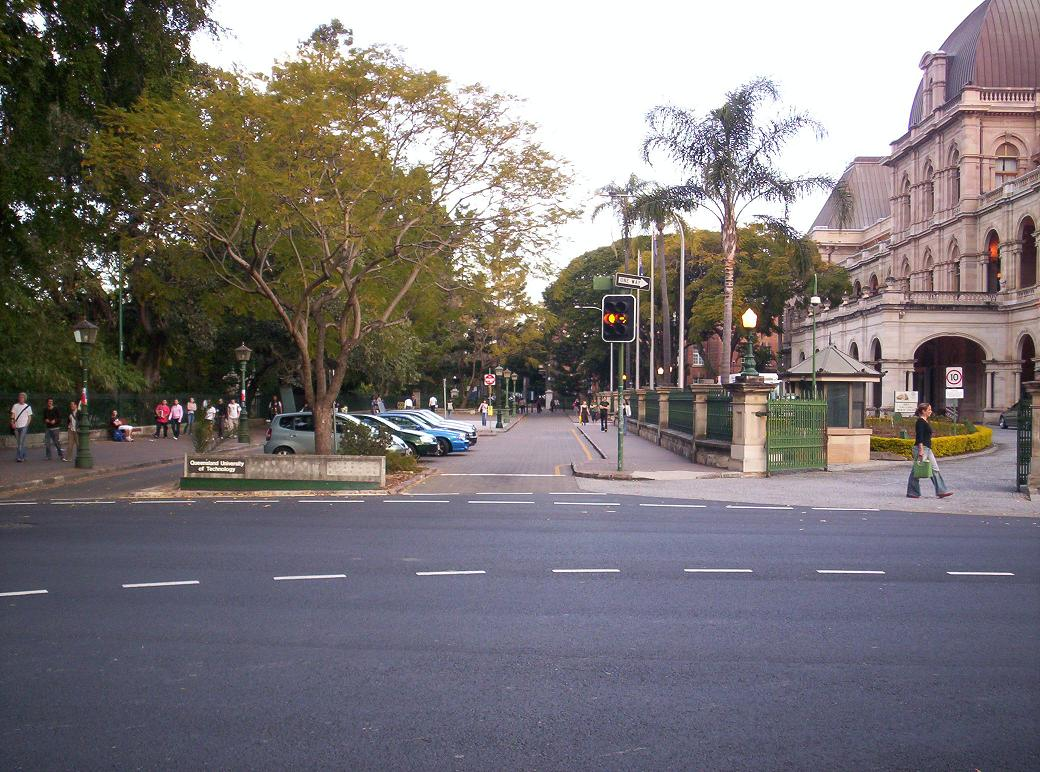
Entrance to QUT Gardens Point campus with Parliament House at right (view from corner of George and Alice Streets)

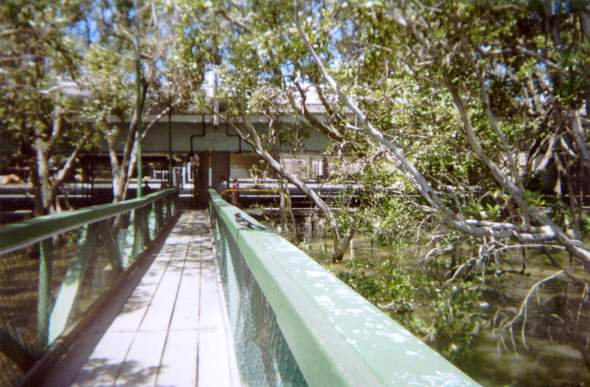
Mangroves at the QUT CityCat terminal

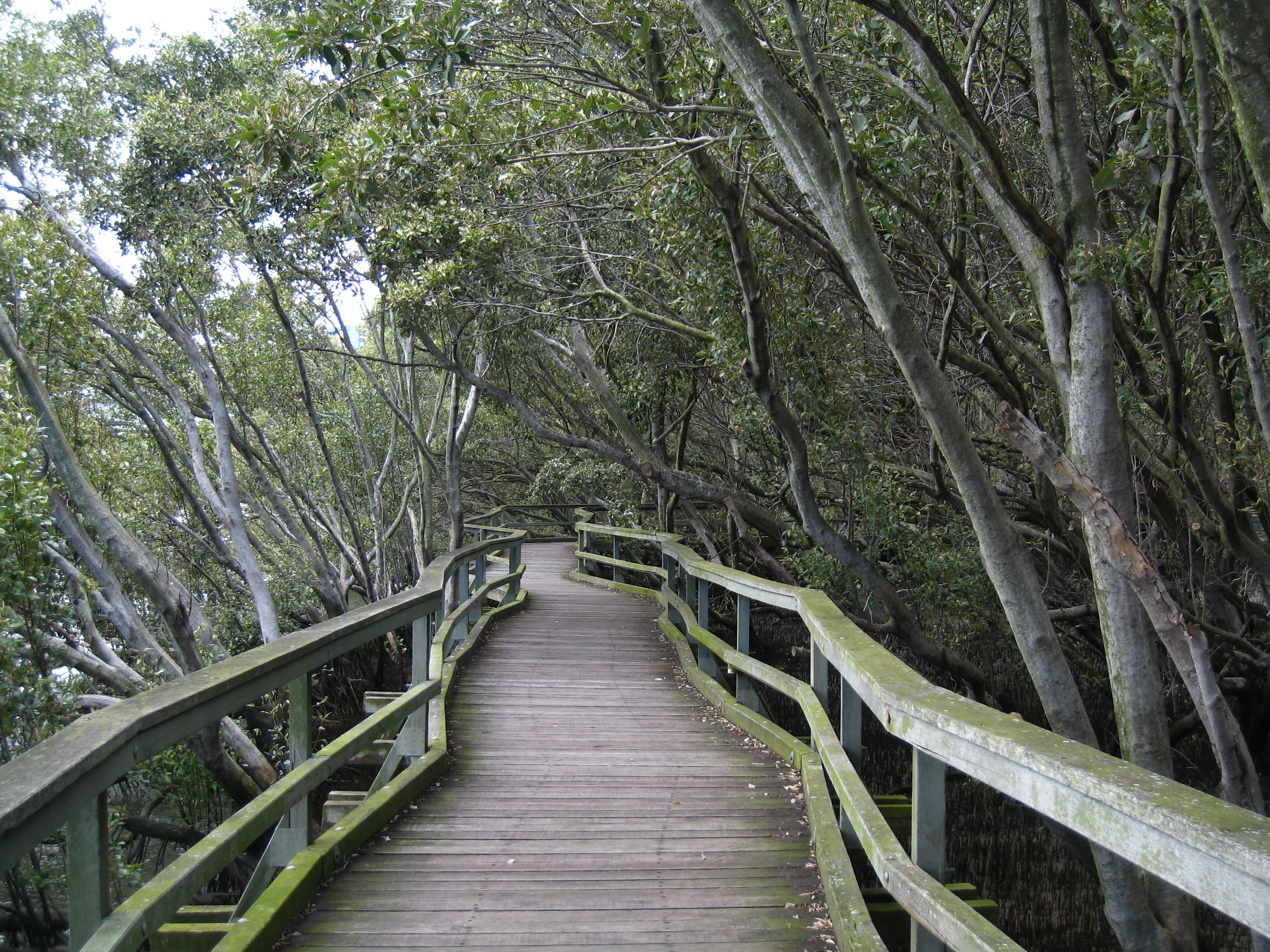
Gardens Point: Boardwalk through the mangroves

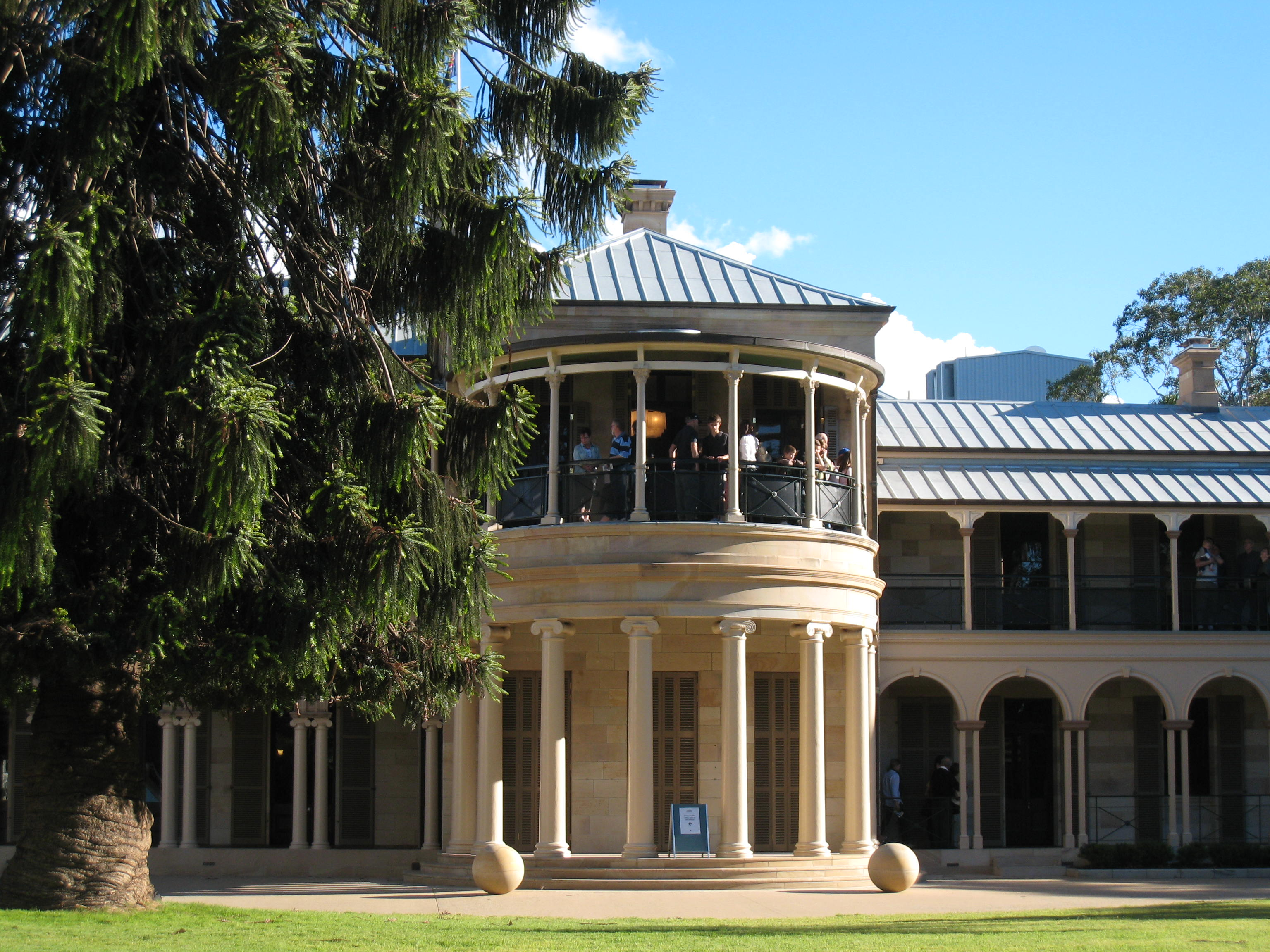
Old Government House, QUT Gardens Point
