= Alice Street, Brisbane =

Street in Brisbane, Queensland

Alice Street Queensland
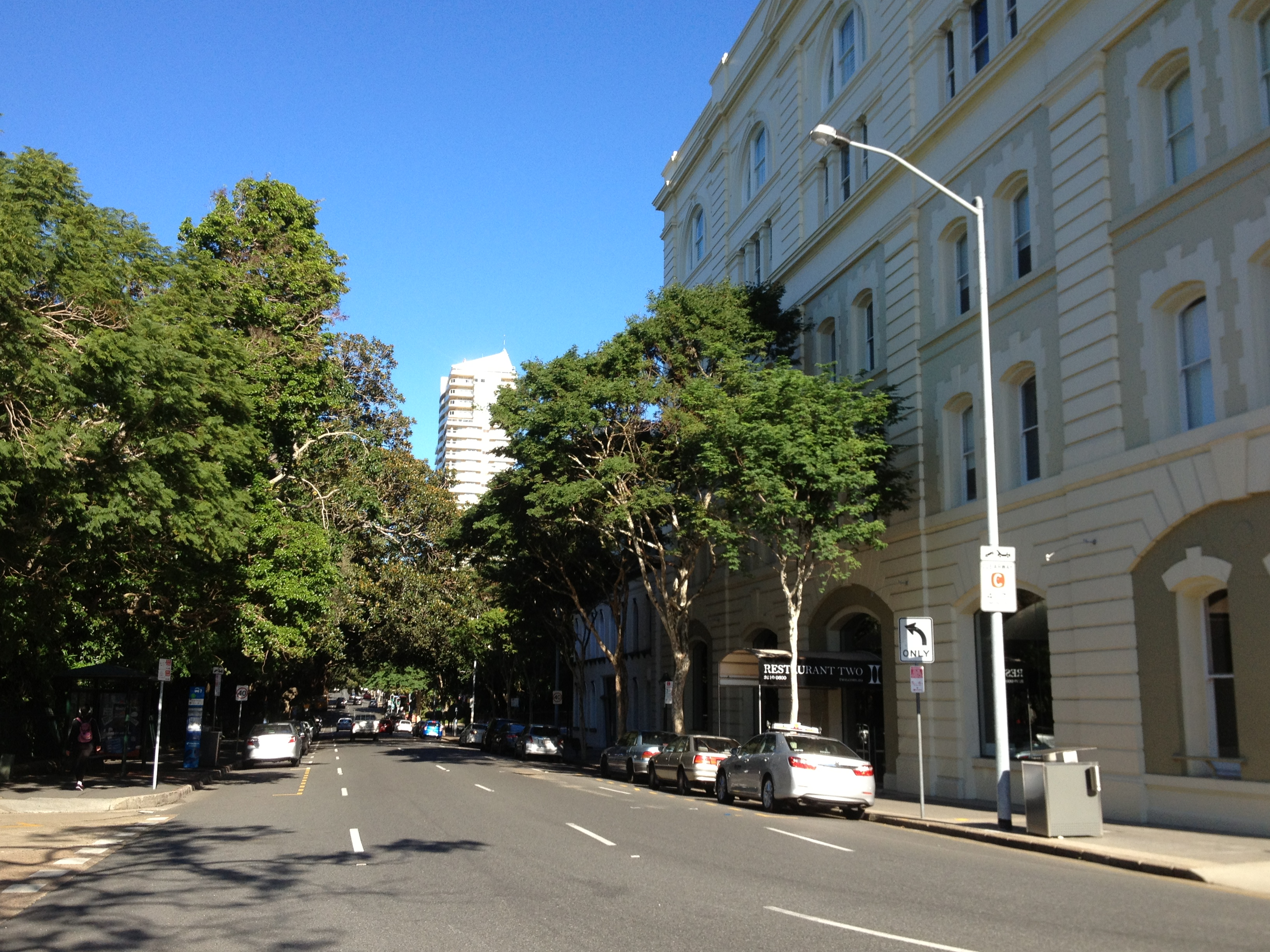
- Alice Street from Edward Street intersection.
- Coordinates: 27.474104°S 153.02806°E

General information
- Type: Street
- Location: Brisbane
- Length: 550 m (0.3 mi)

Alice Street is a street in the central business district of Brisbane, Queensland, Australia. It is the most southern major road in the Brisbane CBD, running parallel to the city’s other female-named streets. It was named in honour of Princess Alice of the United Kingdom.

== Geography ==
In a pocket of land between a curve of the Brisbane River and Alice Street is the City Botanic Gardens and Parliament House. Access to the Gardens Point QUT campus and the Riverside Expressway is provided at the western end of the street.

The male-named streets from William Street to Edward Street end at intersections with Alice Street.

== History ==
Alice Street is one of the earliest streets in Brisbane.

Brisbane Ferries operated from the eastern end as early as the 1860s.

== Heritage listings ==
Alice Street has a number of heritage-listed sites, including:

- Parliament House, 69 Alice Street
- City Botanic Gardens, 147 Alice Street
- Britannia Foundry, 210 Alice Street
- Old Mineral House, 2 Edward Street (corner of Alice Street)
- Early Streets of Brisbane, sections of Albert Street, George Street, William Street, North Quay, and Queen's Wharf Road

== Major intersections ==
- Riverside Expressway
- William Street
- George Street
- Albert Street
- Edward Street
