= William Creswell =

Australian admiral (1852–1933)

Sir William Creswell
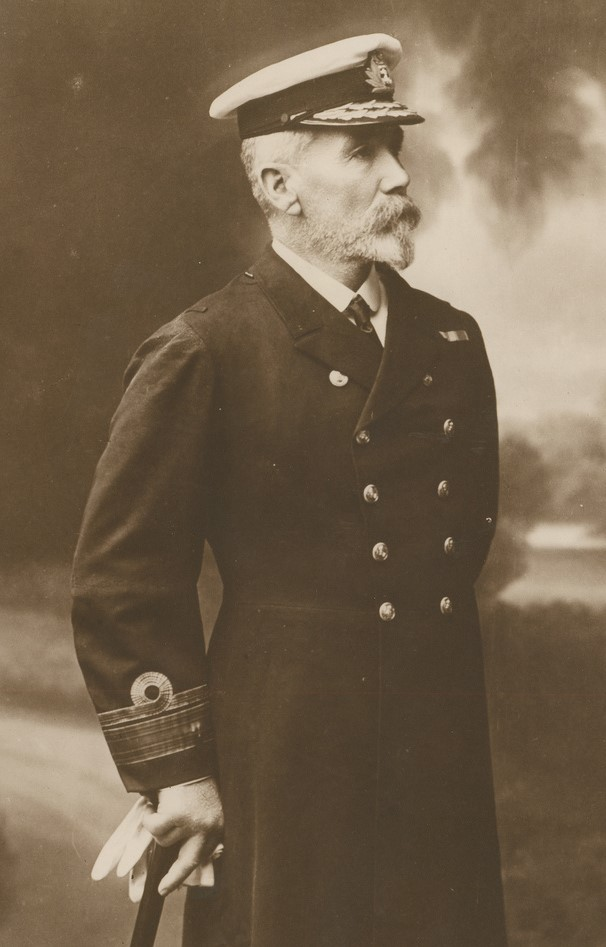
- Rear Admiral Sir William Creswell in 1918
- Born: William Rooke Creswell; 20 July 1852; Gibraltar
- Died: 20 April 1933 (aged 80); Armadale, Victoria
- Military career
- Allegiance: United Kingdom
- Branch: Royal Navy (1865–78); Naval Defence Force of the Colony of South Australia (1885–01); Royal Australian Navy (1901–19)
- Service years: 1865–1879; 1885–1919
- Rank: Vice Admiral
- Commands: First Naval Member Australian Commonwealth Naval Board (1904–19); Naval Commandant Queensland (1900–04); HMCS Protector (1900–01); Naval Commandant South Australia (1893–00); HMS Lion (1878)
- Conflicts: Boxer Rebellion; First World War
- Awards: Knight Commander of the Order of St Michael and St George; Knight Commander of the Order of the British Empire; Second Class of the Order of the Rising Sun (Japan)

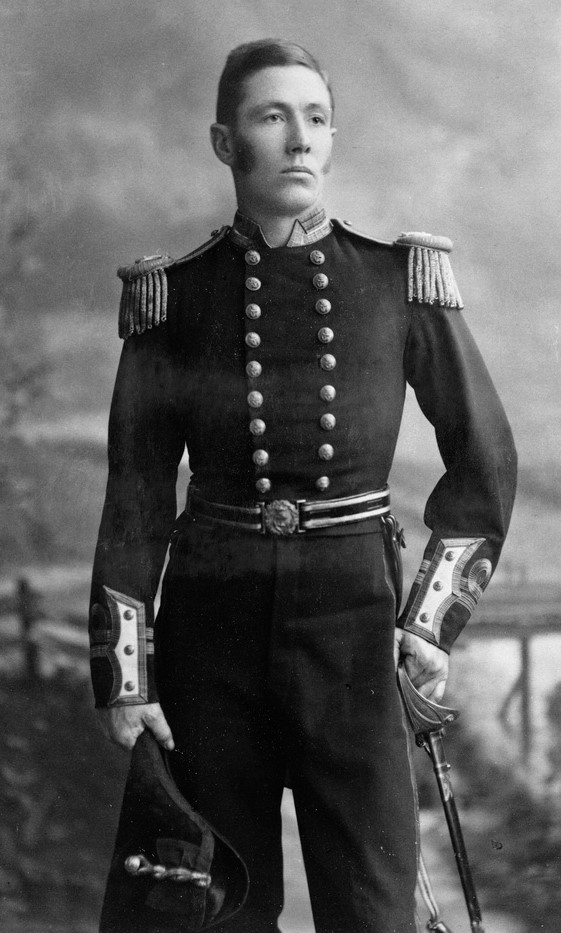
Lieutenant W. R. Creswell in full dress uniform, c. 1873

Vice Admiral Sir William Rooke Creswell, KCMG, KBE (20 July 1852 – 20 April 1933) was an Australian naval officer, commonly considered to be the 'father' of the Royal Australian Navy.

== Early life and family ==
Creswell was born in Gibraltar, son of Edmund Creswell (head of the postal service at Gibraltar and for the Mediterranean), and Margaret Mary Ward, née Fraser. He was educated at Gibraltar and Eastman's Royal Naval Academy, Southsea.

Creswell's brother Edmund (1849–1931) played for the Royal Engineers in the first FA Cup Final in 1872. Another brother, Frederic (1866–1948) was a Labour Party politician in South Africa, who was Minister of Defence from 1924 to 1933.

== Naval career ==
Beginning his naval career at the age of 13 as a cadet on the Royal Navy's training ship Britannia, Creswell was promoted to midshipman in 1867 and on 20 October 1871 became a sub-lieutenant.

Having already served in the Channel Fleet, Creswell was transferred to the China Station. In 1873 while serving with sub-lieutenant Abraham Lindesay on the gunboat HMS Midge he was shot in the hip during a skirmish with pirates from the Laroot River, Penang Malaya but remained at his post. His bravery won him promotion to lieutenant but his wound meant returning to England to recuperate. Creswell's next seagoing appointment, to the East India Station, was followed by a period in Zanzibar, where he commanded a flotilla involved in suppressing the slave trade. Illness, however, again forced his return to England.

Creswell retired from the Royal Navy in 1878 and, seeking to become a pastoralist, he emigrated to Australia in 1879. A stint in the Northern Territory, however, convinced Creswell that he was ill-suited to outback life. During a visit to Adelaide in 1885 he met a former naval colleague and was convinced to take up an appointment as First Lieutenant on South Australia's only naval vessel, HMCS Protector, a posting he very much enjoyed.

As part of the 1897 Diamond Jubilee Honours Creswell was appointed a Companion of the Order of St Michael and St George (CMG).

Creswell soon began agitating for the establishment of an Australian naval force to supplement the Royal Navy squadron based in Sydney. In mid-1895, he reached the rank of captain; by 1899, he was arguing strongly for an Australian navy. On 1 May 1900, he was appointed Commandant of the Queensland Maritime Defence Force, but was soon released to command Protector on its deployment to China to assist in suppressing the Boxer Rebellion.

After Federation, Creswell's lobbying for an Australian navy gained momentum. He was regarded by many as Australia's chief spokesman on naval matters, hence his appointment in February 1904 to the new position of Naval Officer Commanding the Commonwealth Naval Forces (the amalgamation of the various colonial navies). He had retained his position in Queensland and accepted the role of Naval Commandant in Victoria but his energies were primarily focused on the national navy.

Alarmed at Germany's growing naval might by 1909, Australia's admiralty sought to dramatically increase Australia's naval strength. In company with Colonel Justin F. G. Foxton, Creswell attended the Imperial Conference, which resulted in the Naval Defence Act 1910 being passed which created the Australian navy. In 1911, Creswell was promoted to rear admiral in the service of the Royal Australian Navy. As part of the 1911 Coronation Honours, the King knighted him as a Knight Commander of the Order of St Michael and St George (KCMG).

The fact that Australia's navy was ready for service when the First World War began was largely the result of Creswell's hard work and lobbying. During the war he was involved as an administrator in ship construction, the development of shore support, and the arranging of convoys. After the war he worked on developing a defence program for Australia, focussing mainly on ensuring the continued strengthening of the RAN.

== Late life and legacy ==
Considered the father of the RAN, Creswell retired in 1919 and took up farming in Victoria; in the same year he was awarded a second knighthood as a Knight Commander of the Order of the British Empire (KBE). On 8 March 1920 he was awarded the Gold and Silver Star of the Order of the Rising Sun (Second class of the order) by Emperor Taishō of the Empire of Japan. He was promoted to Vice Admiral in 1922. He died on 20 April 1933 and was survived by his wife Adelaide Elizabeth née Stow (daughter of Justice Randolph Stow) two sons and a daughter.

Two sons were killed during the First World War. Captain Randolph William Creswell (1890–1917) served in the 3rd Anzac Camel Battalion, AIF and was killed in action on 6 November 1917 at Tel el Khuweifle, Palestine. He is buried at Beersheba War Cemetery. His twin brother, Lieutenant Edmund Lindsay Creswell was wounded at Bullecourt, but survived the war. Lieutenant Colin Fraser Creswell (1894–1917) was lost in the sinking of submarine E47 off the Dutch coast on 20 August 1917. His oldest daughter, Margaret, took her own life in 1913 at the age of 21.

In 1965, his memoir "Close To The Wind; The early memoirs (1866-1879) of Admiral Sir William Creswell" was published posthumously, his surviving daughter, Noël Vigne, having found the manuscript.

Creswell has been honoured with the naming of the naval base, HMAS Creswell, the site of the Royal Australian Naval College at Jervis Bay.

== See also ==
- John Turner (naval officer)
- Chapman James Clare

== Sources ==
- William Creswell; Paul Thompson (ed.), Close to the Wind: The Memoirs (1866-1879) of Admiral Sir William Creswell (Heinemann, 1965).
- Robert Hyslop, 'Creswell, Sir William Rooke (1852–1933)', Australian Dictionary of Biography, Volume 8, MUP, 1981, pp 145–147.

Military offices
New command	Director, Commonwealth Naval Forces; 1904–1911	Replaced by First Naval Member, Australian Commonwealth Naval Board
New command Replaced Director, Commonwealth Naval Forces	First Naval Member, Australian Commonwealth Naval Board; 1911–1919	Succeeded by Rear Admiral Sir Percy Grant
