= Mostyn Field (Royal Navy officer) =

Royal Navy Admiral (1855–1950)

Admiral Sir Mostyn Field KCB FRS FRGS FRAS
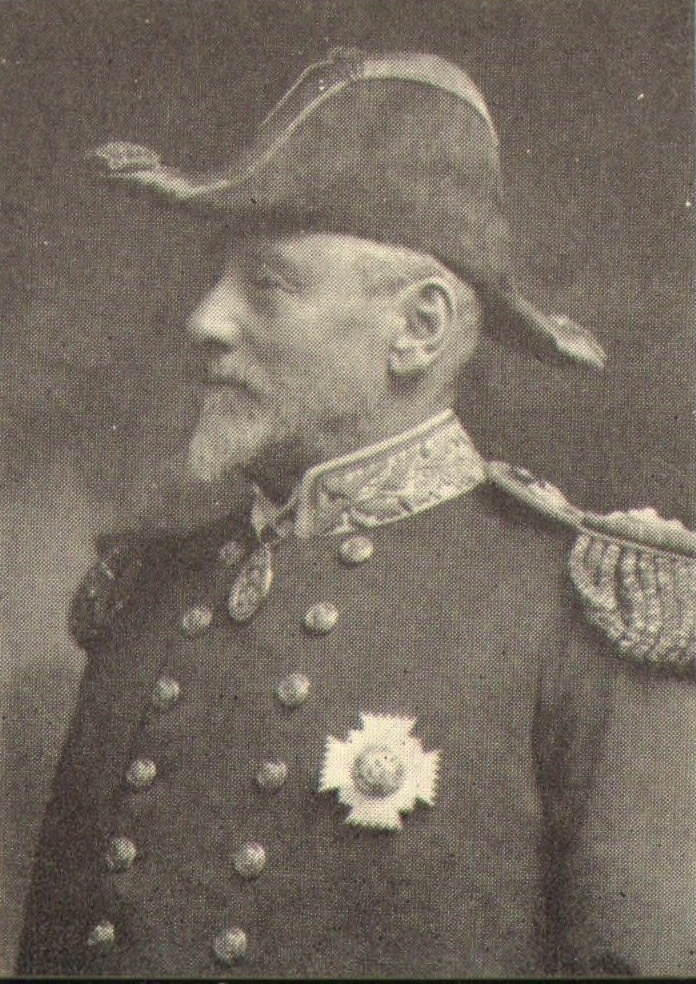
- Born: 27 June 1855; Braybrooke, Northamptonshire
- Died: 3 July 1950 (aged 95); Christchurch, Hampshire
- Military career
- Allegiance: United Kingdom
- Branch: Royal Navy
- Service years: 1868–1910
- Rank: Admiral
- Commands: HMS Penguin
- Awards: Knight Commander of the Order of the Bath
- Office: Hydrographer of the Navy
- Term: 1904-1919

Admiral Sir Arthur Mostyn Field, KCB, FRS, FRGS, FRAS (27 June 1855 – 3 July 1950) was a senior officer in the Royal Navy who served as Hydrographer of the Navy from 1904 to 1909.

== Biography ==
Field was born in Braybrooke, Northamptonshire, the youngest son of Captain John Bousquet Field of the Royal Navy and his wife Cecilia Mostyn. He was educated at Lymington and enlisted in 1868 as a cadet in the Royal Navy, where he joined the training ship HMS Britannia.

After two years basic training Field was appointed in succession to HMS Trafalgar and HMS Narcissus as a midshipman. After further courses of instruction. he was promoted lieutenant in 1875. The following year he was posted to the newly converted survey ship, HMS Fawn, spending the next four years in the Red Sea, the Mediterranean and the east coast of Africa, followed by a survey mission to the Oil Rivers of West Africa. In 1882 he went in HMS Sylvia (1866) to survey the Straits of Magellan.

Field was promoted commander in 1889, and served from 1890 to 1894 on HMS Egeria around Borneo. Made captain in 1895, he was given command of HMS Penguin and commissioned to survey islands in the south west Pacific (1896–99). The Penguin delivered the Funafuti Coral Reef Boring Expedition of the Royal Society of London to Funafuti, arriving on 21 May 1896 and returned to Sydney on 22 August 1896. The Penguin made further voyages to Funafuti to deliver the expeditions of the Royal Society in 1897 and 1898. The surveys carried out by the Penguin resulted in the Admiralty Nautical Chart 2983 for the Ellice Islands (now Tuvalu).

For the next few years, he worked taking depth soundings in home waters, based on the survey vessel HMS Research, to which command he was appointed on 21 April 1900. He was appointed Hydrographer of the Navy in August 1904.

Field was elected a Fellow of the Royal Society in 1905 as a "distinguished hydrographic surveyor". His application citation referred to "Marine Surveys in command of HM Ships from 1886 to 1904 in Australia, Pacific Islands, China Seas, and British Islands", and said he had done much for the scientific explorations of the deep oceans.

Field was promoted to the rank of rear admiral in 1906, vice admiral in 1910, and placed on the retired list later that year. He was made Knight Commander of the Order of the Bath in the 1911 Coronation Honours, and advanced to the rank of admiral on the Retired List on 4 June 1913.

Field wrote on surveying, expanding the textbook "Hydrographical Surveying" written by Admiral Sir William Wharton.

Field had a daughter, Cecilia, who went on to study at Somerville College, Oxford. He died in Christchurch, Hampshire in 1950. His son, Midshipman T. M. Field, was killed in the battlecruiser HMS Queen Mary at the Battle of Jutland in 1916.

== Sources ==
- "Admiral Sir Mostyn Field" (Obituaries). The Times. Tuesday, 4 July 1950. Issue 51734, col E, p. 6.
- Arthur Mostyn Field. 1855-1950 (Obituary Notices of Fellows of the Royal Society) by J. A. Edgell, Royal Society, Vol. 7, No. 20 (November 1951), pp. 355–358.
- The Dreadnought Project article
