= John Turner (naval officer) =

South Australian naval officer

John Denzel Etoile Turner
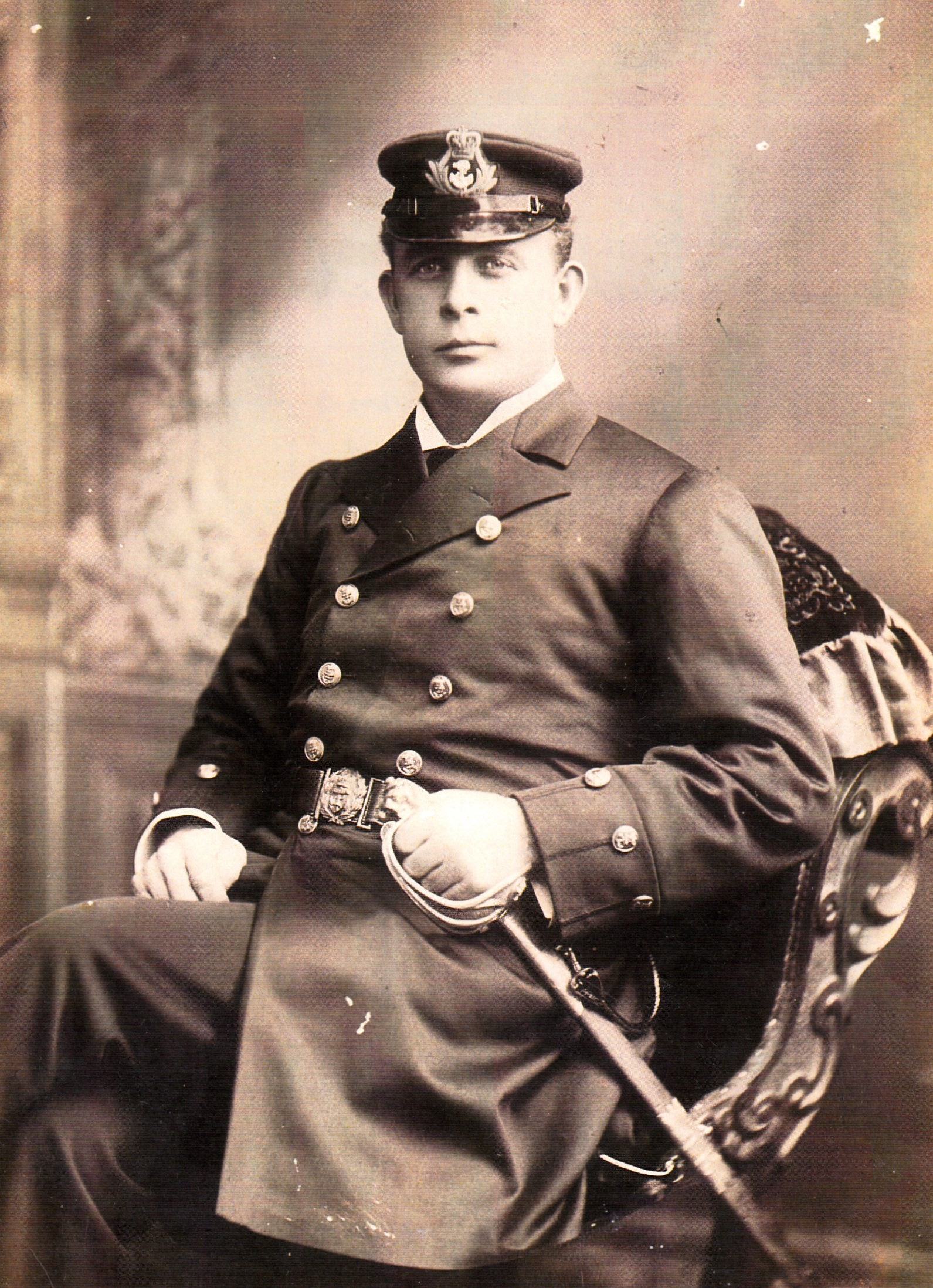
- Born: 3 December 1864; St Albans, Hertfordshire, England
- Died: 24 October 1949 (aged 84); Birkenhead, South Australia, Australia
- Resting place: Cheltenham Cemetery, South Australia, Australia
- Occupation: Naval officer
- Employer: Government of South Australia
- Spouse: Evelyn Annie née Brown
- Parent(s): George Turner and Maria née King

John Denzel Etoile Turner (3 December 1864 – 24 October 1949) was a noted South Australian Naval officer.

== Family and early life ==
Turner was born on 3 December 1864 in St Albans, Hertfordshire, England to parents George Turner and Maria née King. Leaving school at 13 years old, Turner took his first voyage in 1878 on the barque William Nairby to the West Indies. On the return journey, he was wrecked off Yarmouth and later picked up by the steamer Romeo. Turner arrived home two days after his parents had given him up lost at sea.

Turner shipped out again on the Fontabelle headed for the West Indies, and in 1881 joined the Star of Australia bound for the colonies with immigrants. Three years later Turner made another trip to Australia on the windjammer Oaklands, but on arrival at Port Adelaide, relinquished his merchantman and joined the Protector crew as an able seaman in 1884. He was 19 years old.

On 14 November 1888, Turner married Evelyn Annie née Brown (1864–1934), daughter of James Brown (1837–1891) and Sarah Ann née Packer (1839–1901). Together they had eight children in 13 years (although the first two born both died at under two years of age).

Turner died at Birkenhead, South Australia on 24 October 1949. At the time of his death, he was the last surviving officer of the crew who served aboard HMCS Protector during the Boxer Rebellion.

== Naval service ==
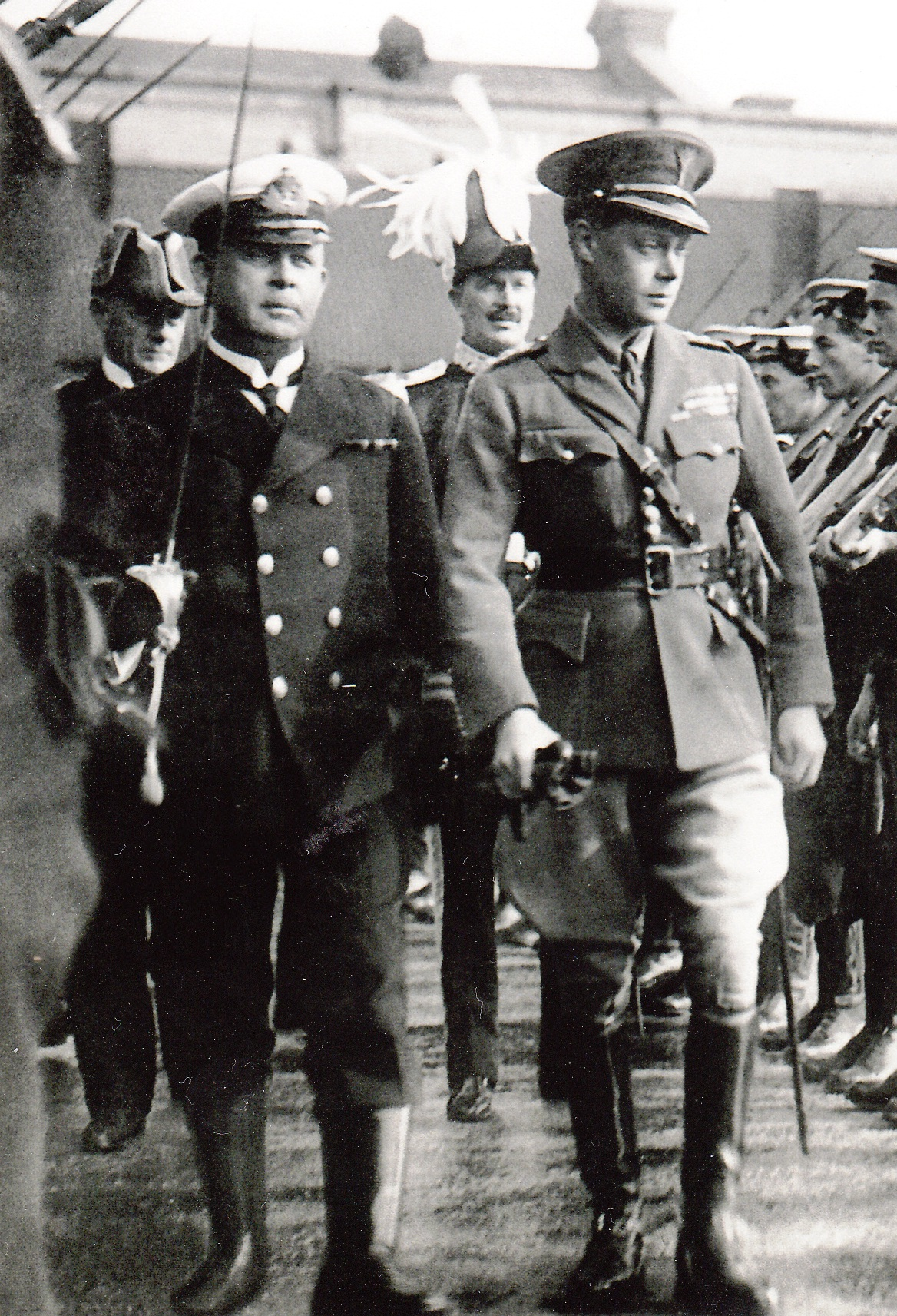
Turner (left) standing guard with His Royal Highness The Prince of Wales in July 1920.

Turner enlisted in the South Australian Naval Force on 24 October 1884 and joined the crew of the newly completed warship HMAS Protector as an able seaman. The Protector was South Australia's only warship at this time and as such was employed to patrol the Colony's coastal waters. Turner was promoted to petty officer in 1886 but the ship's crew was retrenched in 1894. Turner was retained by the Government as a gunnery instructor and in 1896 was promoted to the rank of chief gunner instructor.

In 1900 Turner was further promoted to gunner and instructor aboard HMCS Protector during the ship's deployment to China. The previous month Turner had arranged with the Adelaide Advertiser to act as the paper's Special Correspondent during the ship's passage to China. He was to write from every port along the way, giving full particulars of the work done by the vessel and crew. The Protector was the first colonial ship ever sent on war service. Turner recalled that the Protector reservists drilled for about six hours per day on the trip to China and when they arrived compared favourably with any of the regular naval crews.

On 1 October 1905 Turner was promoted to the rank of chief gunner in the Commonwealth Naval Force. He was Assistant to the District Naval Officer, Port Adelaide, responsible for the South Australian Volunteer Naval Cadets formed at the Largs Bay Naval Depot in 1907, and for the Cadets of the Universal Training Scheme (UTS) when that scheme came into force in 1911. In October 1913, the Naval Cadets won the Empire Challenge Shield with Turner credited and recognised for his instruction of the Port Adelaide team.

Turner was promoted to lieutenant on 1 January 1914 and transferred to the depot ship HMAS Penguin berthed at Garden Island where he was Assistant District Naval Officer. The promotion was based on merit, but the Naval Board also recognised Turner's ability and sense of strict discipline tempered with kindheartedness, which appealed to the Naval Cadets in South Australia. On 1 September 1916 Turner was appointed District Naval Officer, Thursday Island where he formed and operated the Torres Strait Patrol Service. After the war he was appointed Sub District Naval Officer and Executive Officer of the Birkenhead Naval Depot on 13 October 1919.

On 12 July 1920, Turner was Officer of the Guard for the arrival of His Royal Highness The Prince of Wales. Turner's eldest son, Sub Lieutenant John George James (Jack) Turner, Royal Australian Naval Reserve, was Second Officer of the Guard. Promoted to the rank of lieutenant commander on 1 May 1922, Turner was transferred to the Retired list on 1 November 1922.

== Later life ==
In early August 1936, a reunion of the Protector crew was held at Alberton, Port Adelaide. Both Captain Clare and Commander Turner were given an ovation when they were announced. Turner was highly regarded by the Able seaman for being a smart officer, well up in his work, and yet kind and courteous to those who served under him. At the time of his death on 24 October 1949, he was the last surviving officer of the crew who served aboard HMCS Protector during the Boxer Rebellion.

== Gallery ==
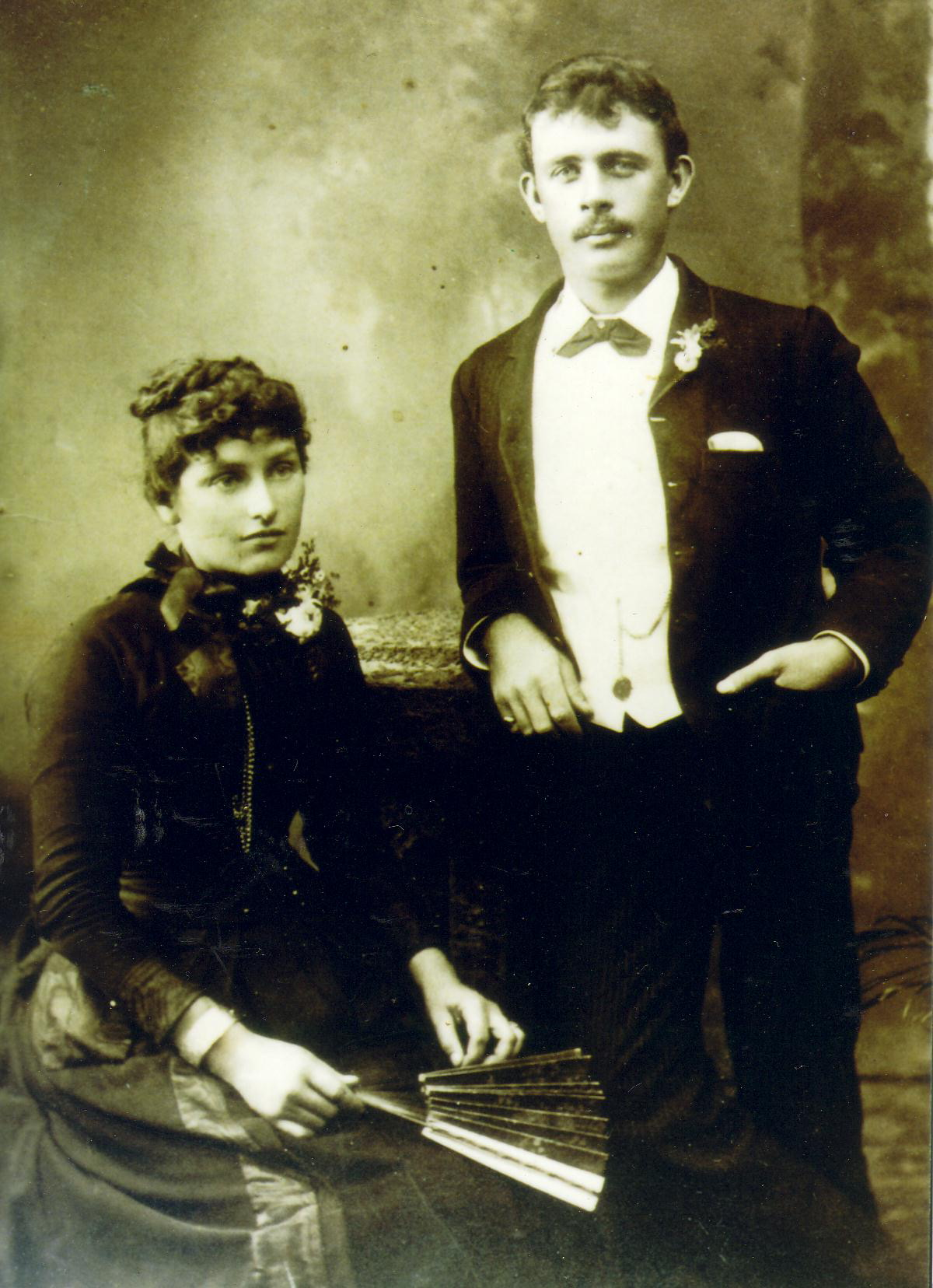
Turner on his wedding day to Evelyn Annie née Brown, on 14 November 1888.

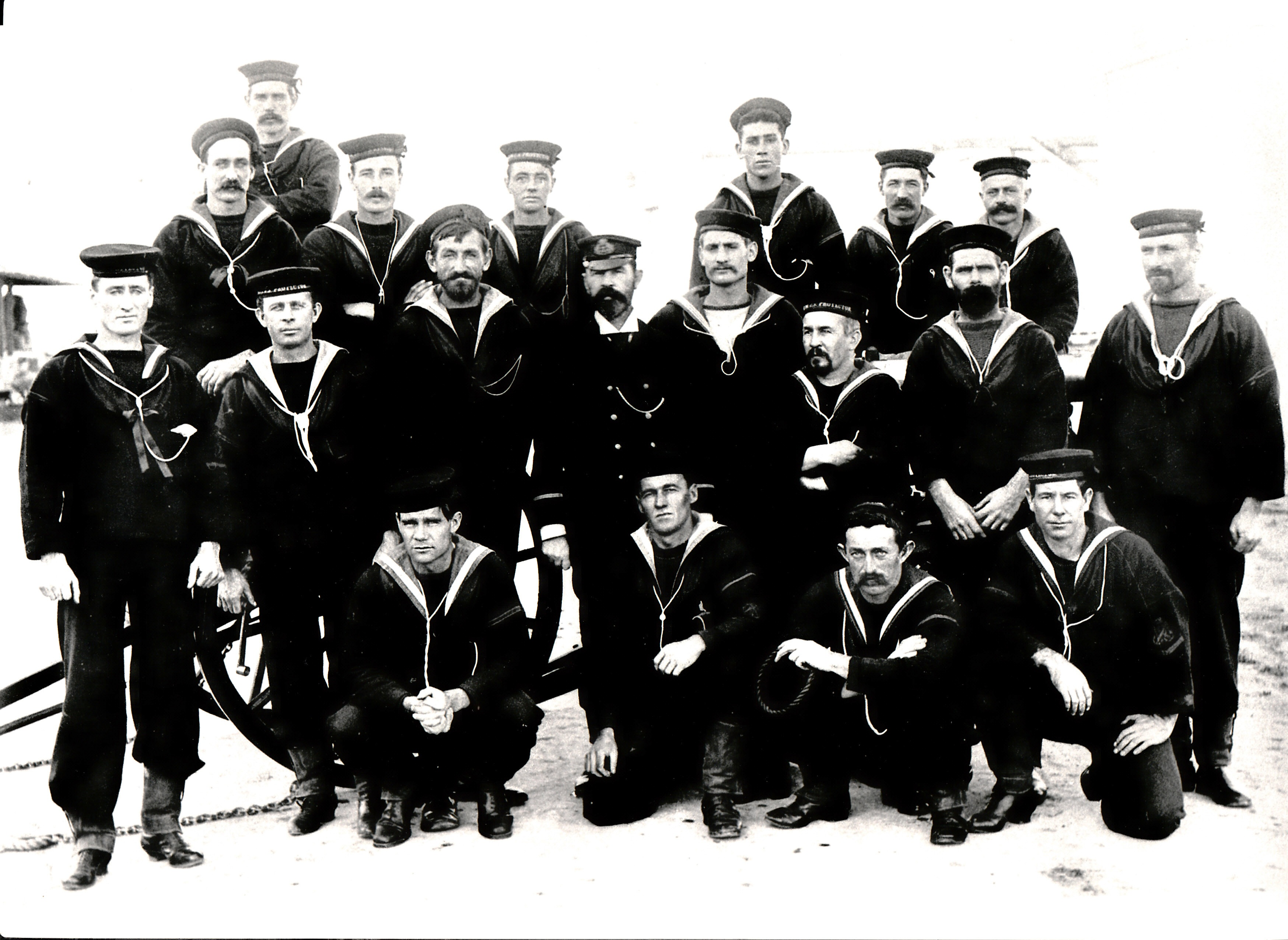
Protector's gun crew c. late 1890s. Turner is standing in the middle row, second from the left.

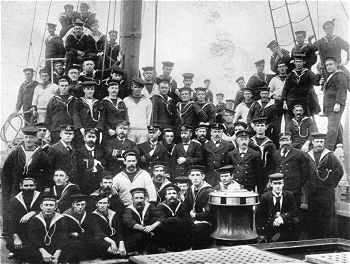
Protector crew c. 1900. Turner is the officer standing (second from left) in the bottom LHS of the photo.

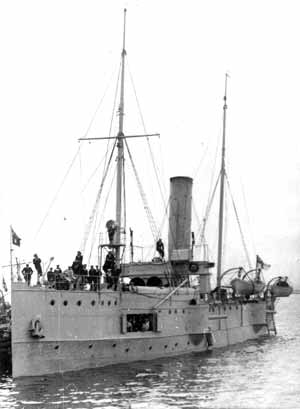
Photo of the Protector taken around 1900.

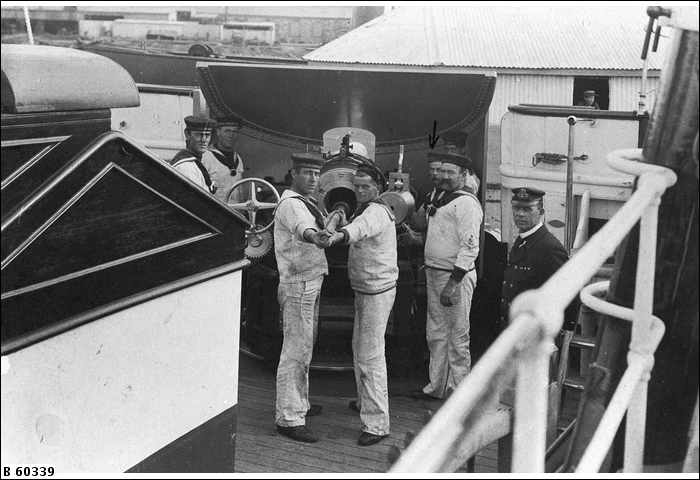
Protector gun crew. John Turner is the officer standing at right; taken about 1900.

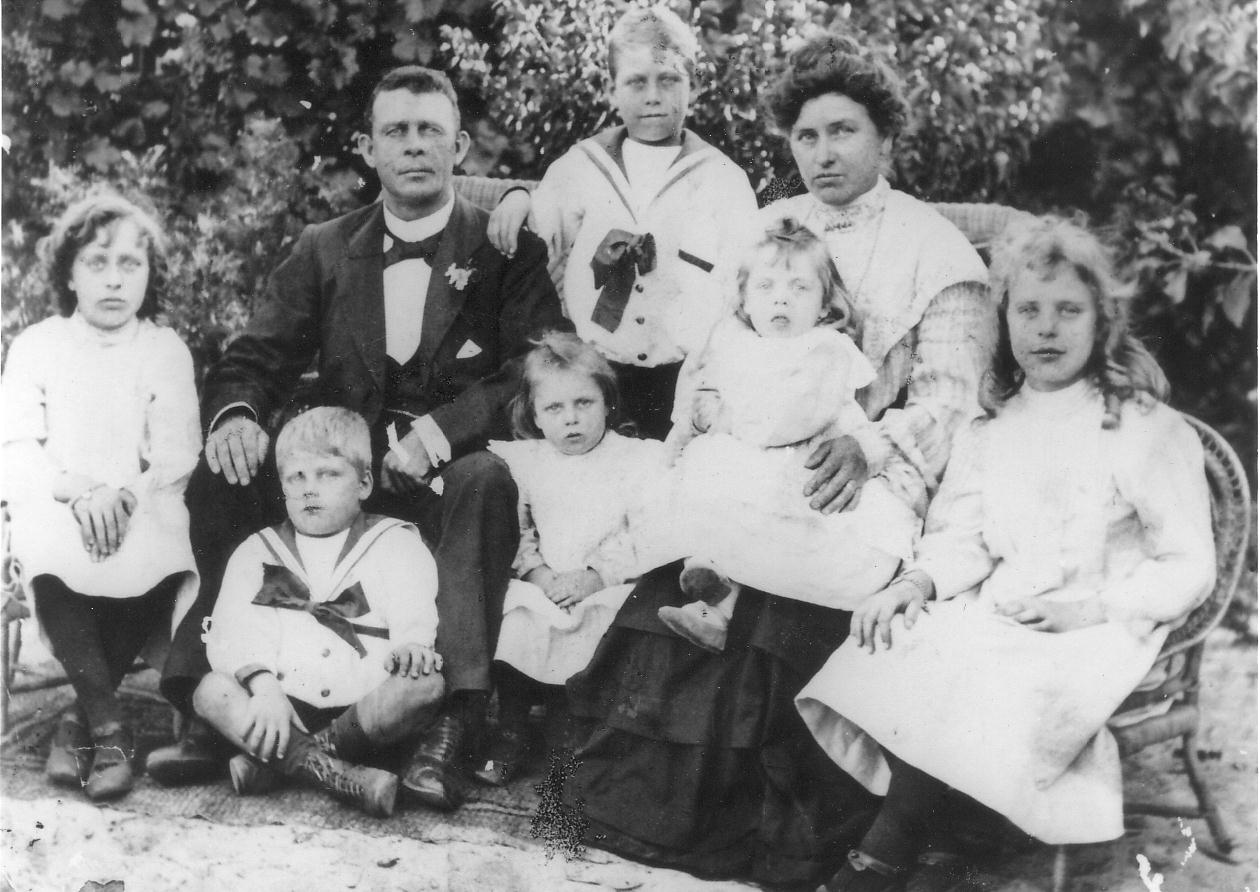
John Denzel Turner family portrait about 1903.

== See also ==
- Chapman James Clare
- William Rooke Creswell
