= HMS Penguin (1876) =

HMS Fantome

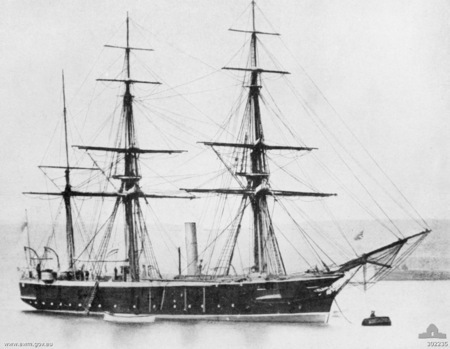
- HMS Penguin

History

United Kingdom
- Name: HMS Penguin
- Builder: Robert Napier and Sons, Govan
- Cost: Hull: £39,611; Machinery: £12,500
- Yard number: 342
- Laid down: 14 July 1874
- Launched: 25 March 1876
- Commissioned: 23 August 1877
- Recommissioned: 1886
- Decommissioned: 1889
- Recommissioned: 1890
- Decommissioned: 1908
- Fate: Transferred to Australian service

Australia
- Name: HMAS Penguin
- Acquired: 1908
- Commissioned: 1 July 1913
- Decommissioned: 1924
- Fate: Converted to crane hulk in 1924

General characteristics
- Class & type: Osprey-class screw composite sloop
- Displacement: 1,130 long tons (1,150 t)
- Length: 170 ft (51.8 m) (p/p)
- Beam: 36 ft (11.0 m)
- Draught: 15 ft 9 in (4.8 m)
- Depth: 19 ft 6 in (5.9 m)
- Installed power: 666 ihp (497 kW); (later 951 ihp (709 kW))
- Propulsion: 1 × 2-cylinder horizontal returning-rod steam engine (Note: The horizontal returning-rod steam engine by R & W Hawthorn failed to meet the contract speed and was replaced after the first commission by a Devonport Dockyard 2-cylinder horizontal compound-expansion steam engine); 3 × cylindrical boilers; 1 × screw
- Sail plan: Barque rig
- Speed: 11 knots (20 km/h; 13 mph)
- Range: 1,120 nmi (2,070 km; 1,290 mi) at 10 knots (19 km/h; 12 mph)
- Complement: 140
- Armament: 2 × 7-inch (178 mm) rifled muzzle-loading guns; 4 × 6.3-inch (160 mm) 64-pounder rifled muzzle-loading guns; 4 × machine guns; 1 × light gun

HMS Penguin was an Osprey-class sloop. Launched in 1876, Penguin was operated by the Royal Navy from 1877 to 1881, then from 1886 to 1889. After being converted to a survey vessel, Penguin was recommissioned in 1890, and operated until 1908, when she was demasted and transferred to the Australian Commonwealth Naval Forces for use as a depot and training ship in Sydney Harbour. After this force became the Royal Australian Navy, the sloop was commissioned as HMAS Penguin in 1913. Penguin remained in naval service until 1924, when she was sold off and converted into a floating crane. The vessel survived until 1960, when she was broken up and burnt.

== Design and construction ==
Penguin was an Osprey-class sloop-of-war, with a composite hull design. The ship had a displacement of 1,130 tons, was 170 feet (52 m) long, had a beam of 36 feet (11 m), and a draught of 15 feet 9 inches (4.80 m). An R & W Hawthorn two-cylinder horizontal returning-rod steam engine fed by three cylindrical boilers provided 666 indicated horsepower (497 kW) to the single 13 ft (4.0 m) propeller screw. This gave Penguin a top speed of 9.9 knots (18.3 km/h; 11.4 mph), which failed to meet the required contract speed. After the first commission the engine was replaced by a Devonport Dockyard two-cylinder horizontal compound-expansion steam engine, developing 951 indicated horsepower (709 kW). She had a maximum range of 1,480 nautical miles (2,740 km; 1,700 mi) at 10 knots (19 km/h; 12 mph). In addition to the steam-driven propeller, the vessel was also barque rigged. The standard ship's company was between 140 and 150.

Armament consisted of two 7-inch (90 cwt) muzzle-loading rifled guns, four 64-pounder guns, four machine guns, and one light gun.

Penguin was built by Robert Napier and Sons, of Govan, Scotland. The vessel was laid down on 14 July 1876 as yard number 342. She was launched on 25 March 1876, and commissioned into the Royal Navy on 23 August 1877. Construction costs included £39,611 for the hull, and £12,500 for her steam machinery.

== Operational history ==
=== British service ===
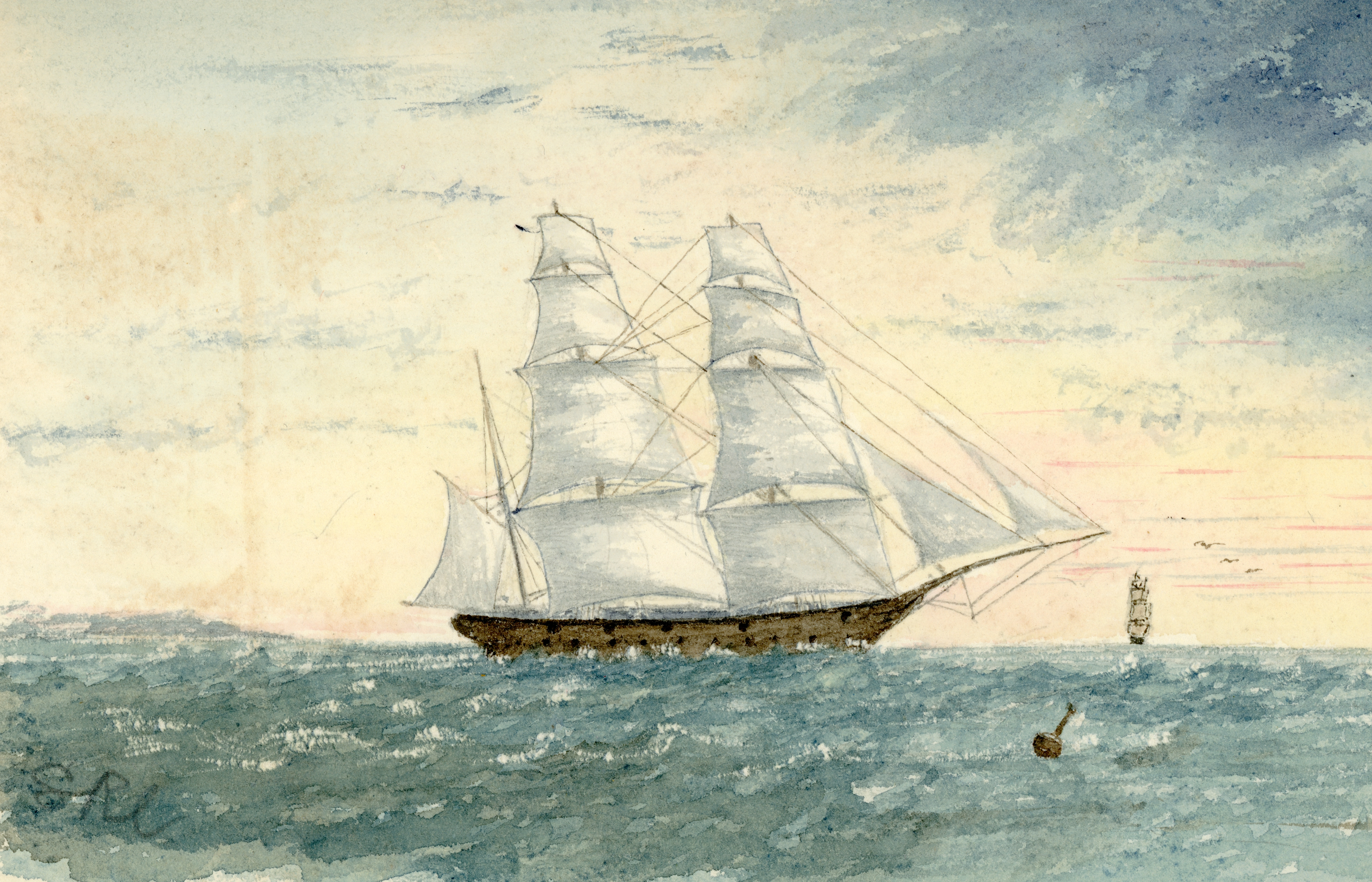
An 1878 sketch of the Penguin in British Columbia

After entering service, Penguin was assigned to the Pacific Station until 1881, when she was paid off. Recommissioned in 1886 for the East Indies Station, she formed part of Rear-Admiral Fremantle's Anti-Slave Trade Squadron and participated in the blockade of Zanzibar in 1888 before returning to England and being paid off in 1889. She underwent a refit as a survey vessel and commenced service on the Australia Station in 1890 and undertook survey work around the Western Pacific islands, New Zealand and the Great Barrier Reef off Queensland. Lieutenant Boyle Somerville, one of the surveyors at this time commented: "The Naval Surveying Service has ever had foisted upon it for its work any old castaway ship that has become useless for other branches of the Navy ... But of all the old clumbungies with which the Surveying Service has been saddled, the Penguin would be hard to beat for clumbunginess". As a round-bottomed vessel, with a single (auxiliary) propeller and a rudder that was hard work for two sailors to steer, she was particularly unsuited for taking deep soundings where the ship had to be held in a steady position, sometimes for several hours. In spite of this, the Penguin's crew made a successful sounding in the Kermadec Trench between New Zealand and Tonga. They found a depth of 5,155 fathoms (9,427 m), a record at that time.

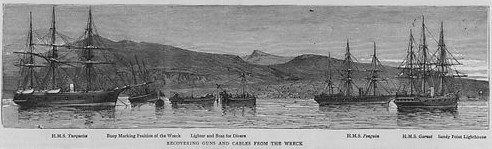
Penguin assisting in the recovery of guns and cables from the wreck of HMS Dotorel, The Graphic 1881

The Penguin under the command of Captain Arthur Mostyn Field, delivered the "Funafuti Coral Reef Boring Expedition of the Royal Society" to Funafuti in the Ellice Islands, arriving on 21 May 1896 and returned to Sydney on 22 August 1896. The Penguin made further voyages to Funafuti to deliver the expeditions of the Royal Society in 1897 and 1898. She visited New Zealand during Autumn 1902.

=== Australian service ===
Her masts removed, she was transferred for harbour service at Sydney in 1908, before being commissioned into the RAN as HMAS Penguin, a depot ship, on 1 July 1913.

== Decommissioning and fate ==
Her hull was sold to Samuel Waugh Ltd and converted into a crane hulk at Sydney in 1924. Later sold for breaking up, her hull was burnt on 13 December 1960 at Kerosene Bay, Sydney.

== See also ==
- John Turner (naval officer)

== Bibliography ==
- Ballard, G. A. (1939). "British Sloops of 1875: The Larger Ram-Bowed Type". Mariner's Mirror. 25 (January). Cambridge, UK: Society for Nautical Research: 35–49. doi:10.1080/00253359.1939.10657318.
- Bastock, John (1988), Ships on the Australia Station, Child & Associates Publishing Pty Ltd; Frenchs Forest, Australia. ISBN 0-86777-348-0
- Colledge, J. J.; Wardlow, Ben & Bush, Steve (2020). Ships of the Royal Navy: The Complete Record of All Fighting Ships of the Royal Navy from the 15th Century to the Present (5th ed.). Barnsley, UK: Seaforth Publishing. ISBN 978-1-5267-9327-0.
- Preston, Antony; Major, John (2007). Send a Gunboat: The Victorian Navy and Supremacy at Sea, 1854–1904 (2nd ed.). London: Conway. ISBN 978-0-85177-923-2.
- Roberts, John (1979). "Great Britain and Empire Forces". In Chesneau, Roger & Kolesnik, Eugene M. (eds.). Conway's All the World's Fighting Ships 1860-1905. Greenwich, UK: Conway Maritime Press. ISBN 0-8317-0302-4.
- Lyon, David & Winfield, Rif (2004). The Sail and Steam Navy List: All the Ships of the Royal Navy 1815–1889. Chatham Publishing. ISBN 978-1-86176-032-6. OCLC 52620555.
