= HMAS Protector (1884) =

Flat-iron gunboat of Royal Australian Navy

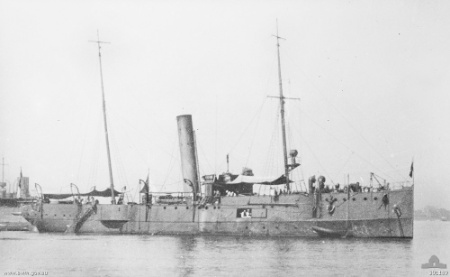
- HMAS Protector in 1914

History

Australia
- Builder: Sir WG Armstrong, Mitchell & Co, Newcastle upon Tyne
- Laid down: 16 November 1882
- Launched: May 1884
- Commissioned: 19 June 1884
- Decommissioned: June 1924 (RAN naval service)
- Recommissioned: July 1943 (US army service)
- Out of service: July 1943
- Motto: Faith for Duty
- Honours and awards: Battle honours: China 1900; Rabaul 1914
- Fate: Scuttled as a breakwater at Heron Island, 1943.

General characteristics
- Type: Armstrong type F1 flat-iron gunboat
- Displacement: 920 tons
- Length: 180 ft (54.9 m)
- Beam: 56 ft (17.1 m)
- Draught: 12 ft (3.7 m)
- Propulsion: 2 compound surface condensing engines
- Speed: 14 knots (26 km/h; 16 mph)
- Complement: 85 to 96
- Armament: As built: 1 × BL 8-inch (203.2 mm) Mk VII gun; 5 × BL 6-inch (152.4 mm) 80-pounder guns; 4 × QF 3-pounder guns; 5 × Gatling guns; From 1914: 3 × QF 4-inch Mk III guns; 2 × QF 12-pounder guns; 4 × QF 3-pounder guns

HMCS (later HMAS) Protector was a large flat-iron gunboat commissioned and purchased by the South Australian government in 1884, for the purpose of defending the local coastline against possible attacks in the aftermath of the 'Russian scare', of the 1870s. She arrived in Adelaide in September 1884 and served in the Boxer Rebellion, World War I and World War II.

During July 1943, Protector was requisitioned for war service by the U.S. Army. On the way to New Guinea and off Gladstone, she was damaged in a collision with a tug and abandoned. The hull was taken to Heron Island off the Queensland coast and later sunk for use as a breakwater. Her rusting remains are still visible to this day.

== Description and armament ==
Built by Sir WG Armstrong, Mitchell & Co, Newcastle upon Tyne, England, Protector was built to a standard type F1 flat-iron gunboat design, but was one of the largest of its type, and was classified as a light cruiser, with a displacement of 920 tons. Her length was 180 feet 6 inches (55.02 m), with two compound surface-condensing engines that produced 1,500 horsepower (1,100 kW). Her top speed was 14 knots (26 km/h; 16 mph). To conserve fuel (coal) she was originally rigged as a topsail schooner.

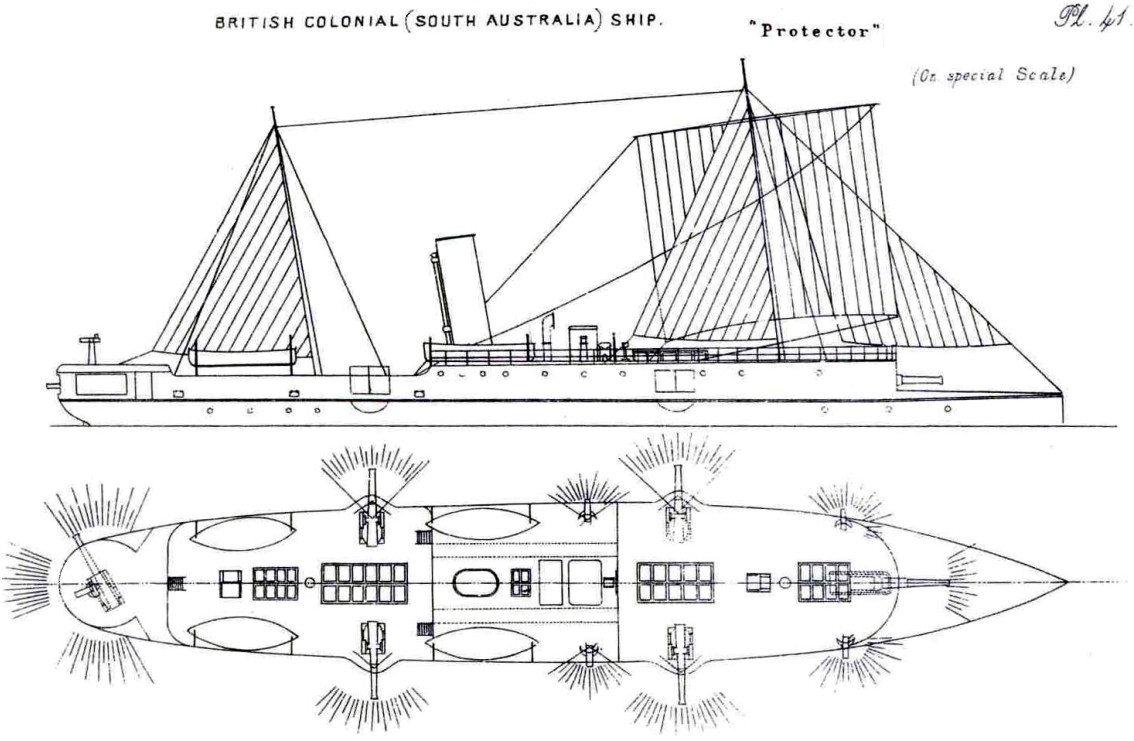
Starboard elevation and deck plan, 1888

For her size, Protector was exceptionally heavily armed. Her largest weapon was the 8-inch (203 mm) Armstrong-rifled breech-loading gun mounted at the bow. The gun weighed 12 tons and could fire a 180-pound (82 kg) shell 7,500 yards (6,900 m) using a charge of 90 lb (41 kg) of black powder.

Other armaments included five 6-inch (152 mm) Woolwich-Armstrong rifled breech-loading guns; four 3-pounder 1.85-calibre Hotchkiss QF guns and five 10-barrel (1.6 m^{3}) Gatling machine guns. Her small arms consisted of 200 0.45 Martini-Henry rifles Mk IV, 100 breech-loading revolvers, 100 cutlasses and 30 boarding pikes.

At the outbreak of World War I, her armament was increased to include two 4-inch (100 mm) guns, two 12-pounder guns and four 3-pounder guns.

== Operational history ==
In July 1882, motions were brought forward in both houses of the Parliament of South Australia to establish a naval force with the creation of a cruiser-type warship, capable of defending the local coastline and harbours. At the suggestion of Sir William Jervois, Armstrong, Mitchell & Co. of Newcastle upon Tyne were chosen to build the vessel, named Protector, for about 40,000 to 50,000 pounds sterling. The builder's estimate was £63,600. The contract authorising construction was signed on 16 November 1882 and the time allotted was fourteen months. The final cost was £65,000.

A number of alterations were incorporated during the vessel's time on the builder's slip, delaying completion until May 1884. On 19 June, the Protector was ready for sea. She was officially commissioned and during the day undertook her initial speed trial run over a four-hour period. Her average speed was 14 knots (26 km/h). The guns were then tested in the open sea.

Protector sailed from Newcastle upon Tyne on 27 June 1884, en route to Australia and arrived in Gibraltar on 5 July. Sailing via Malta and Port Said, the Protector anchored at Suez on 25 July. Rigged as a topsail schooner the gunboat sailed on to Colombo (Sri Lanka), leaving there on 25 August. During her voyage to Adelaide Protector flew the Blue Ensign. She left King George's Sound in late September and on 30 September, arrived at Port Adelaide.

Protector's first commanding officer was Commander J.C.P. Walcott RN, who brought her out from England. He served as the commander in charge of the South Australian Naval Forces until August 1893, when he was succeeded by Captain Creswell. Protector remained in South Australian waters for the next fifteen uneventful years. Her only activities comprised regular deployments on station at Largs Bay.

=== Boxer Rebellion ===
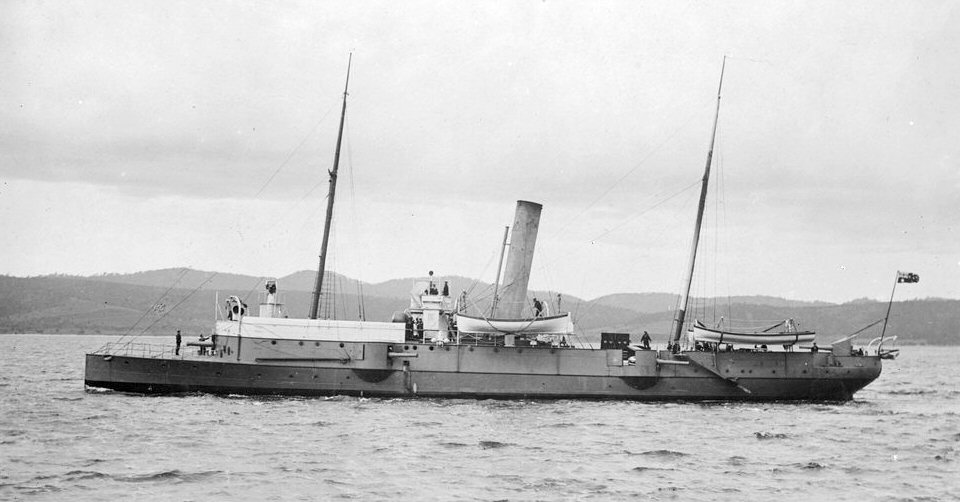
Protector circa 1901

Around the turn of the 20th century, all Australian colonies were involved in the Boer War in South Africa, when a call from Britain came to help defeat the Chinese secret society known as the Boxers. South Australia responded by offering Protector and her crew, which varied in number between 85 and 96.

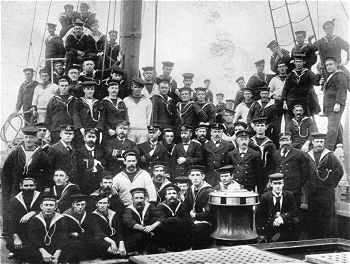
Protector's crew in 1900

Protector was to join an international force composed of sailors, marines, and soldiers from Britain, France, Italy, the United States, Japan, Russia, Germany, and Austria-Hungary—the so-called Eight-Nation Alliance—to protect the lives of foreign nationals and to defend their economic interests. The British asked that the ship be commanded and manned by British personnel, and although the South Australian government did not agree to the crewing request, commanding officer Chapman James Clare was temporarily demoted to second in command, with William Rooke Creswell, a British officer and Commandant of the Queensland Maritime Defence Force installed as the ship's captain.

Protector sailed from Adelaide, flying the White Ensign, on 6 August 1900. She was temporarily commissioned as HMS Protector for legal reasons, and arrived at Hong Kong on 11 September 1900. A week later, she departed for Shanghai.

In Chinese waters, the expected use of shallow draught vessels such as Protector was not called for, but she performed useful work as a survey vessel and in carrying despatches in the Gulf of Pechili. By the beginning of November, the Admiralty had decided it could dispense with her services, and she was released to return to Adelaide on 2 November 1900. During her return voyage, Protector participated in the ceremonies inaugurating the Australian Commonwealth in Sydney on 1 January 1901.

=== Australian Commonwealth ===
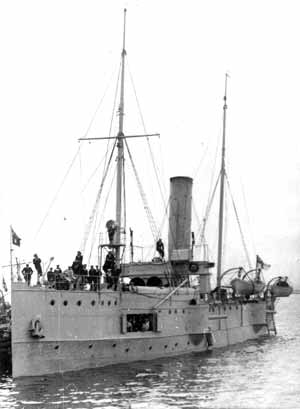
Protector in 1901

In 1901, Protector was transferred to the Australian Commonwealth Government and became a Commonwealth naval vessel primarily based in Sydney, New South Wales. In the years leading up to the establishment of an Australian Naval Fleet, Protector was active around the southern and eastern seaboards. Her main role was to train the Naval Militia Forces of New South Wales, Victoria, and South Australia, a duty which she continued on following the foundation of the Royal Australian Navy. From September 1913, she served as a tender to the first steam-powered Australian warship, HMAS Cerberus in Williamstown, Victoria.

=== World War I ===
When World War I broke out in 1914, Protector was sent to Sydney and she began service as a parent/depot ship to two Australian submarines, AE1 and AE2. On 28 August 1914, she sailed from Sydney as escort to the submarines headed for German New Guinea colonies. After the surrender of these colonies on 17 September, Protector remained based at Rabaul as a port guard ship until early October 1914, when she sailed for Sydney in the company of HMAS Fantome.

Protector remained in Australian waters, mainly at Melbourne, until October 1915, when she sailed for the Cocos Islands in the Indian Ocean to report on the wreck of the German cruiser Emden. Emden had been driven ashore on North Keeling Island by HMAS Sydney on 9 November 1914.

Protector returned to Australia in December 1915 and thereafter, for the remainder of the war period, was employed again as a tender to HMAS Cerberus and seagoing duty for a period as a minesweeper in Victorian coastal waters.

=== Between the wars ===
In the post war period, she continued to serve as a tender to HMAS Cerberus (the warship) at Williamstown. In May 1920, she carried the advance party to Flinders Naval depot on Westernport Bay (later renamed HMAS Cerberus Training School) in preparation for the official opening which took place on 1 September 1920.

On 1 April 1921, the Protector lost her thirty-seven-year-old identity when she was renamed HMAS Cerberus. (In turn, the then HMAS Cerberus was renamed Platypus II.)

=== Disposal ===
In June 1924, Protector's 40-year naval career came to a close when she was paid off for disposal and was sold to Mr J. Hill of Melbourne for £677 and 10 shillings. Protector was dismantled and her armament, engines and all movable parts were sold at auction. Conversion work to a lighter then took place and was completed in November 1929. Her old ammunition magazines served as a bunker for about 300 tons of oil fuel.

In 1931, she was re-sold to the Victorian Lighterage Co and was renamed Sidney. For several years she served as a wool lighter.

=== World War II ===
During July 1943, Protector was requisitioned for war service by the U.S. Army. En route to New Guinea and off Gladstone, she was damaged in a collision with a tug and abandoned on a beach near Gladstone. In the same year, the hulk was purchased by Christian Poulsen for ten pounds, and was subsequently taken to Heron Island off the Queensland coast, where the vessel was sunk for use as a breakwater.

== Present day ==
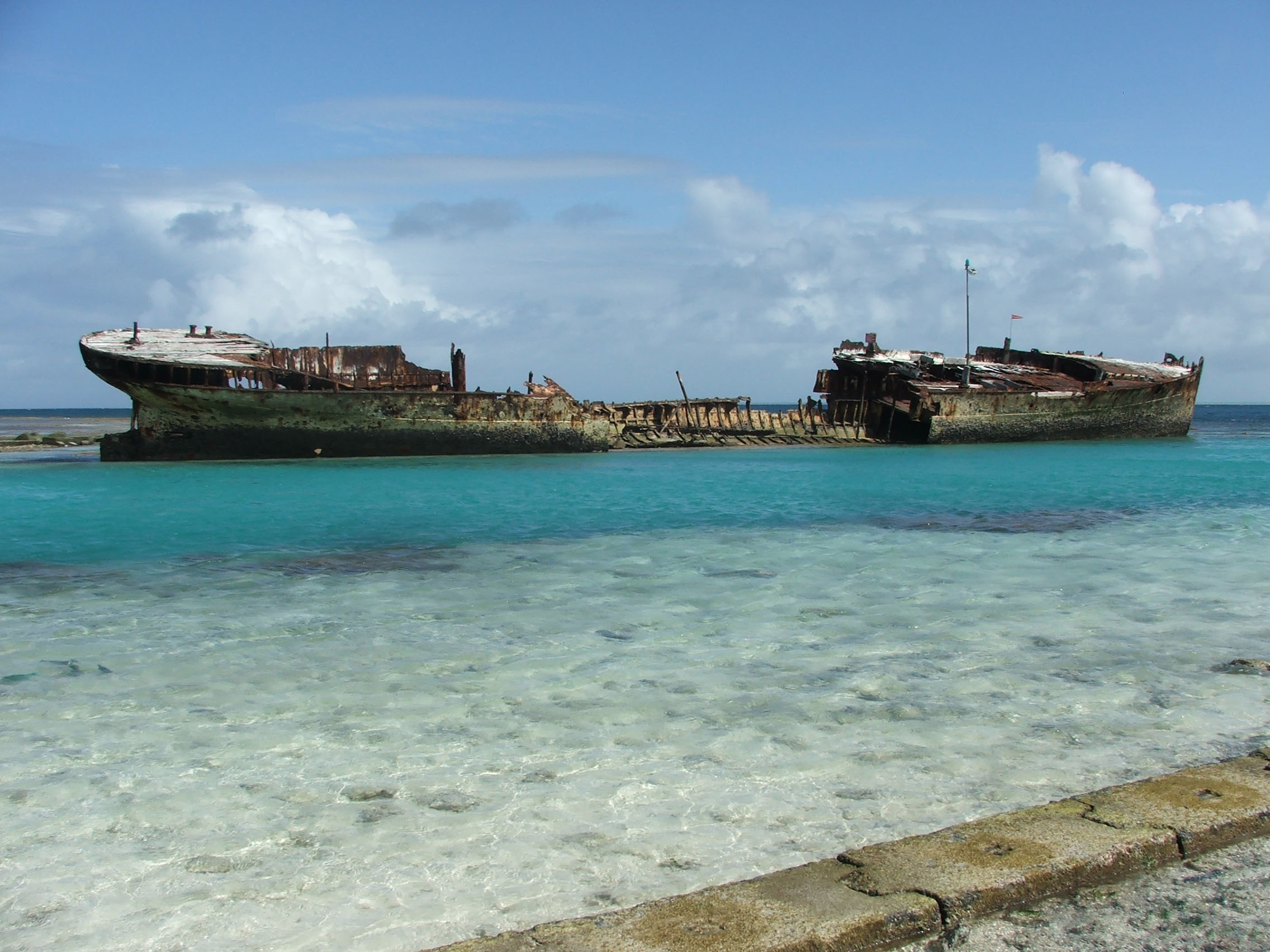
The remains of Protector at Heron Island in 2008 at low tide (broadside)

As of 2024, only the deteriorated and rusted iron hull of Protector remains, which is clearly visible from Heron Island as a breakwater in position 23.4428°S 151.909°E. The wreck can also be reached by walking at low tide. The reef around the wreck provides good diving and snorkelling at high tide.

Protector's stern 6-inch (150 mm) breech-loading gun mounting was located at Semaphore's foreshore, a historic seaside suburb of Adelaide, South Australia, for many years. In 1998, it was relocated a short distance away outside TS Adelaide at the Birkenhead Naval Depot in Birkenhead, South Australia. In 2018, the gun was returned to the Semaphore foreshore following a joint restoration project by the RAN and Le Fevre High School.

A 4-inch (100 mm) QF gun from Protector is on display at the National Military Vehicle Museum in Edinburgh, South Australia.

The ship's wheel is on display at the Royal Australian Navy Heritage Centre in Sydney.

Following an overhaul of the RAN battle honours system, completed in March 2010, Protector was retroactively awarded the honours "China 1900" and "Rabaul 1914".

== See also ==
- John Turner (naval officer)
