= Chapman James Clare =

British-Australian sailor (1853–1940)

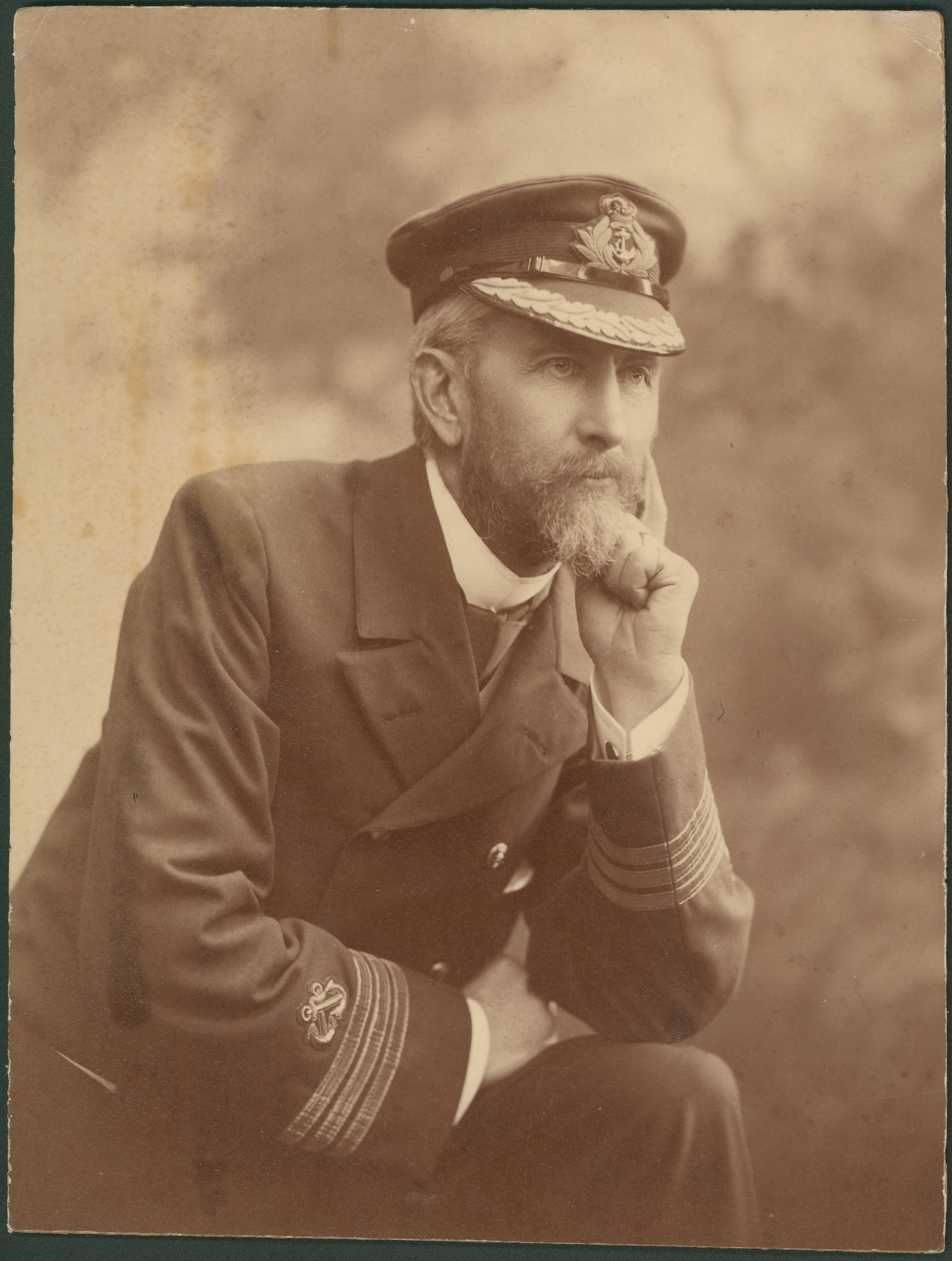
- Chapman James Clare from The Adelaide Chronicle, 5 July 1902
- Born: 23 June 1853; Bay of Biscay
- Died: 28 September 1940 (aged 87); Glenelg, Adelaide, Australia
- Occupation: Sailor
- Known for: Coastwatchers

Chapman James Clare CMG (23 June 1853 – 28 September 1940) was a British sailor who worked on merchant vessels, then on Australian government ships, and after formation of the Royal Australian Navy as a senior naval officer. He served during the Boxer Rebellion (1899–1901) and World War I (1914–1918). It was on his suggestion, 1919, that a Coastwatchers organisation should be established. The coastwatchers played an important role during World War II.

== Early years ==
Chapman James Clare was the son of John Coughron Clare, a merchant ship master. He was born on his father's ship Matilda Wattenbach on 23 June 1853 in the Bay of Biscay. His father became a lieutenant in the Royal Naval Reserve. Clare was educated in private schools in England at Cheshunt and Edmonton. When Clare was fifteen he joined Smith, Fleming & Co. of London as a merchant marine apprentice, and worked on sailing ships for the next five years.

In 1873 Clare became mate on a steamer of the Royal Mail Line of Belgium. From 1875 until 1880 he worked on steamers of Apcar & Company of Calcutta, engaged in the opium trade between Calcutta and Hong Kong. Clare resigned from Apcar & Company in 1880 and moved to South Australia. On 15 June 1880 he joined the Marine Board. In 1884 he was put in command of Governor Musgrave, a steamer engaged in maintenance of coastal lighthouses and navigation aids. On 5 April 1885 Clare married Ellen Minnie Cotgrave. They had three children, two boys and one girl.

== Naval officer ==
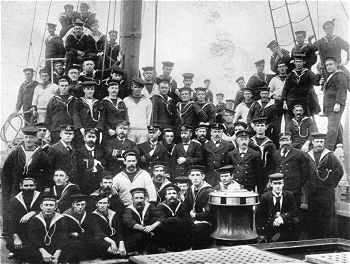
Crew of HMCS Protector in 1900

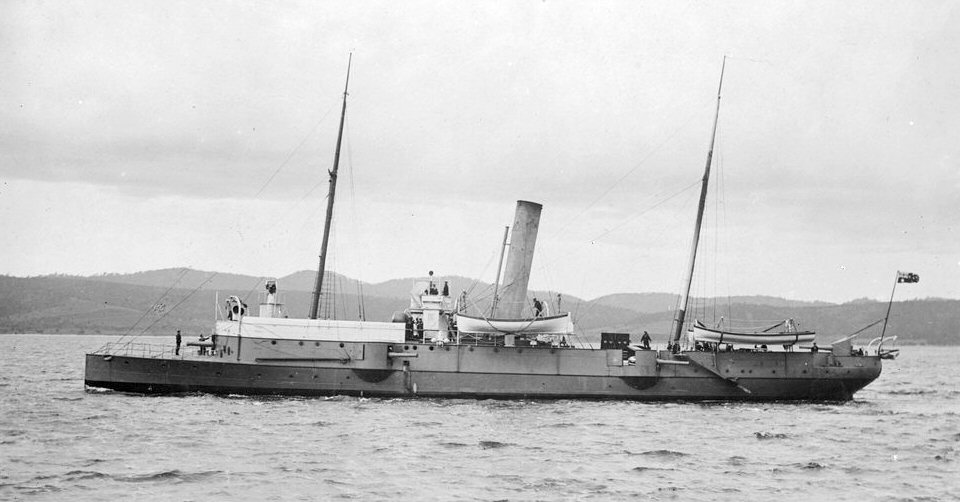
HMCS Protector in 1901

Clare spent some time in the South Australian naval reserve, then on 1 December 1886 was appointed lieutenant-commander in the South Australian Naval Forces. Until 1900 he nominally remained master of Governor Musgrave but spent much of this time in the cruiser HMCS Protector training reserves and performing other duties. In May 1900 Clare was appointed commander, transferred to the Protector. In July 1900 Clare succeeded Captain William Rooke Creswell as naval commandant on the Protector. Creswell became Commandant of the Queensland Naval Forces. Later that year the Australian government offered to lend the Protector to assist British forces engaged in suppressing the Boxer Rebellion (1899–1901). For reasons of protocol, Clare agree to serve as second in command under Creswell, a former Royal Navy officer. The Australian government did not accede to the British demand that the ship be manned by a British crew.

Clare was appointed captain in December 1900. From 1901 he was the second most senior officer in the Commonwealth Naval Forces. In 1901 Clare was one of the judges of the 1901 Federal Flag Design Competition to choose a national flag for Australia. They selected the winner from 32,823 submissions. In 1905 he was listed as Captain of the Protector, Commandant and Superintendent of Life Saving Services. He continued to command the Protector in home waters until 1910. The Royal Australian Navy was established in 1911. Clare was made district naval officer in Western Australia.

During World War I (1914–1918) Clare's command convoyed Australian troops to Europe. Clare became a member of the Western Australian Coal Board in 1917.

While the Empire of Japan was an Allied country at the time, on 20 November 1917, a battery at Fremantle Harbour fired a shell as the Japanese cruiser Yahagi. The shell fell within 300 metres (980 ft) of Yahagi. Clare, as commander of the Western Australian Naval District attempted to explain the incident, but was the situation became politicised for several reasons. While Japanese forces had earlier captured the German colony of Tsingtao, and the Imperial Japanese Navy had frequently escorted Australian and other Allied vessels in the Pacific, Indian Ocean and Mediterranean theatres, as well as performing patrol duties, some Allied governments, including that of Australia, maintained an official ban on immigration by people of non-European descent, under racially discriminatory laws; in theory, all Japanese citizens were affected by these laws. In addition, Allied governments had blocked Japanese offers to join front-line combat operations in other parts of the world. Furthermore, politicians and the press in Allied countries down-played the Japanese contribution. Admiral Kazuyoshi Yamaji, who had ejected Clare's explanation, eventually received a full apology.

After the war, Clare was district naval officer of South Australia until his retirement in July 1919. In 1919 Clare proposed the coastwatchers organisation, a volunteer force of government employees that watched for suspicious shipping or aircraft movements along the north coast of Australia. His proposal was accepted and extended to cover the Solomon Islands and Papua New Guinea. The organisation was to play an important role during World War II (1939–1945).

== Later years ==
Clare lived in retirement from 1919 onward at Glenelg, Adelaide, where he died on 28 September 1940 at the age of 87.

Clare was made a Companion of the Order of St Michael and St George (CMG) in the 1902 Coronation Honours list on 26 June 1902 for his services during the Boxer Rebellion. He was awarded the Japanese Order of the Rising Sun for his work with the Imperial Japanese Navy during World War I.

== See also ==
- John Turner (naval officer)
- William Rooke Creswell
