= STS Young Endeavour (1987) =

Tall ship operated and maintained by the Royal Australian Navy

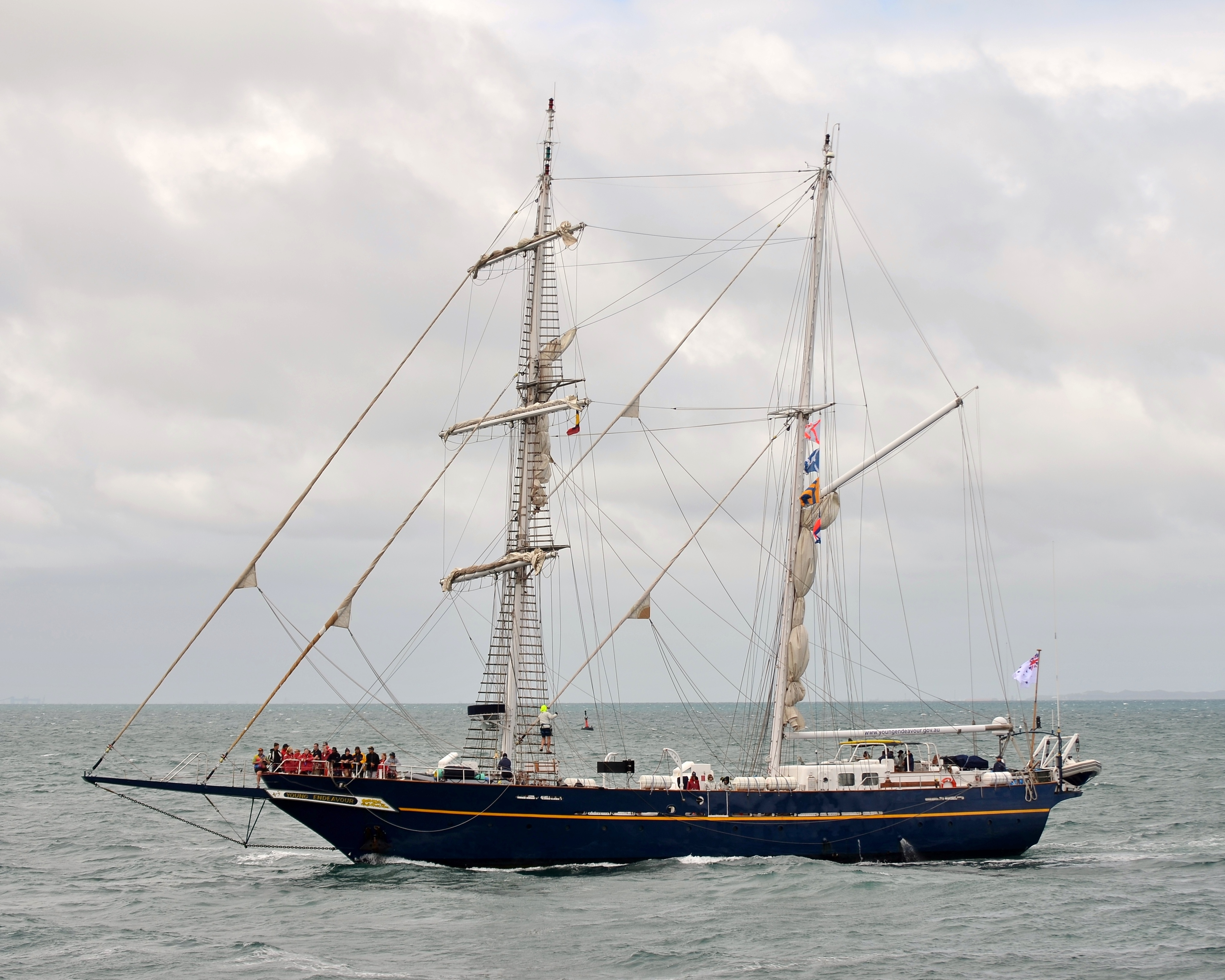
- Young Endeavour in 2016

History

Australia
- Name: Young Endeavour
- Namesake: HM Bark Endeavour
- Builder: Brooke Marine Limited
- Laid down: May 1986
- Launched: 2 June 1987
- Maiden voyage: 3 August 1987
- In service: 25 January 1988
- Home port: Fleet Base East, Sydney
- Identification: IMO number: 8971164; MMSI number: 503071000; Callsign: VMGW
- Motto: Carpe diem; Latin: "Seize the day"
- Status: Active as of 2021
- Badge

General characteristics
- Type: Sail training ship
- Displacement: 239 tonnes
- Length: 44 m (144 ft 4 in) length overall; 28.3 m (92 ft 10 in) waterline length
- Beam: 7.8 m (25 ft 7 in)
- Draught: 4 m (13 ft 1 in)
- Propulsion: 2 × Perkins V8 M200 TI diesel engines, 165 hp (123 kW) each
- Sail plan: 10 sails, brigantine rig
- Speed: 14 knots (26 km/h; 16 mph) under sail; 10 knots (19 km/h; 12 mph) on diesels
- Complement: 10 standard, plus 24–30 youth crew
- Armament: 2 x 1.5-inch swivel gun's

STS Young Endeavour is an Australian tall ship. Built by Brooke Marine (which became Brooke Yachts during the vessel's construction), Young Endeavour was given to Australia by the British government in 1988, as a gift to celebrate Australian Bicentenary. Although operated and maintained by the Royal Australian Navy, Young Endeavour delivers up to twenty youth development sail training voyages to young Australians aged 16 – 23 each year. Navy personnel staff the ship and the Young Endeavour Youth Scheme coordinate the voyage program.

During each voyage the ship embarks up to 24 young Australians who learn the skills required to sail a square-rigged tall ship; including how to navigate, keep watch, cook in the galley, take the helm and climb the 30-metre (98 ft) mast to work aloft, setting and furling sails. They are encouraged to pursue personal and team goals and challenges in an unfamiliar environment as they learn to sail a square-rigged tall ship.

Near the end of the voyage, youth crew elect a command team who take full responsibility for Young Endeavour for 24 hours, sailing the ship along the Australian coast. On their last day at sea, the youth crew host a local group of youth with disabilities, sharing their newfound knowledge and experience.

== Design and construction ==
Young Endeavour has a displacement of 239 tonnes. The ship is 44 metres (144 ft 4 in) in length overall and 28.3 metres (92 ft 10 in) in waterline length, has a beam of 7.8 metres (25 ft 7 in), and a draught of 4 metres (13 ft 1 in). The vessel is brigantine-rigged, with a 32-metre (105 ft) tall mainmast, and ten sails with a total area of 511 square metres (5,500 sq ft). Auxiliary propulsion is provided by two Perkins V8 M200 TI diesel engines, providing 165 horsepower (123 kW) each. Young Endeavour can achieve speeds of 14 knots (26 km/h; 16 mph) under sail, or 10 knots (19 km/h; 12 mph) running on the diesels. The vessel is a sister ship to Tunas Samudera, a Malaysian Navy sail training ship.

The ship was ordered by the British government as a gift to Australia in recognition of Australian Bicentenary. Designed by naval architect Colin Mudie, Young Endeavour was laid down by Brooke Marine (which became Brooke Yachts during the vessel's construction) in May 1986, and was launched on 2 June 1987. On 3 August, Young Endeavour sailed from Lowestoft in England to Australia, via Rio de Janeiro, Tristan da Cunha, and the waters of Antarctica. On 25 January 1988, Young Endeavour was handed over to the Australian Government. The ship's motto is carpe diem, Latin for "Seize the day".

Young Endeavour Youth Scheme Although the Australian government decided that Young Endeavour would be operated and maintained by the Royal Australian Navy, the vessel would be used to provide sail training to Australian youth. The "Young Endeavour Youth Scheme" was established in 1988 as a not-for-profit organisation, with a civilian management and administration team based in Sydney, the ship's homeport. The scheme's aims are to develop teamwork and leadership skills in Australian youth, while increasing participants' self-awareness and sense of community spirit.

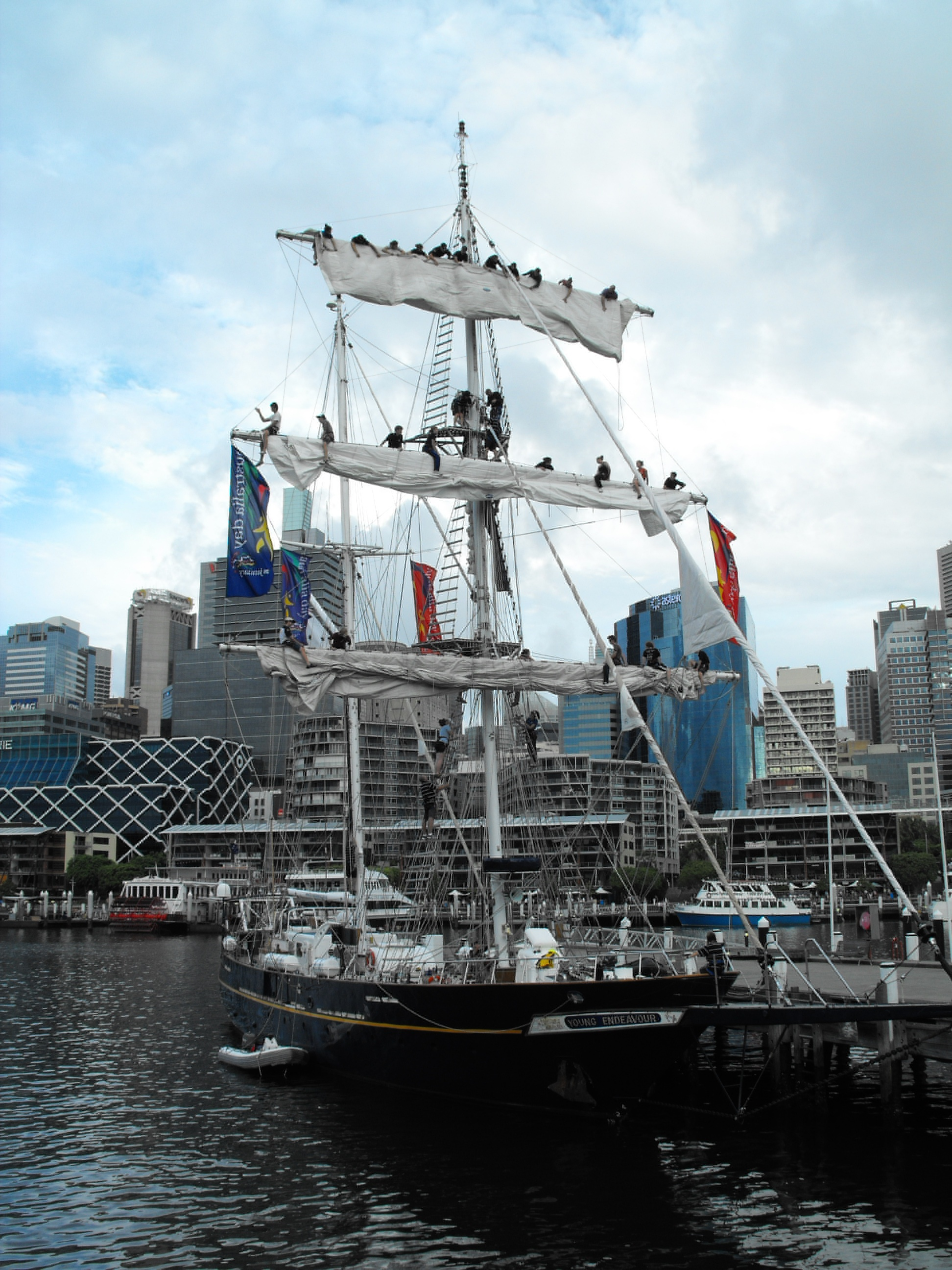
The youth crew of Young Endeavour manning the yards at the end of a day sail

Under the scheme, 24 to 30 "youth crew" (aged between 16 and 23) join a voyage to supplement the 9-10 naval personnel from the Mine Warfare, Hydrographic and Patrol Boat Force, which Young Endeavour is attached to. Over 500 youth crew per year participate in the scheme, and are selected for the voyages by a biannual ballot. Each voyage typically lasts ten to eleven days, during which the youth crew rotate through most roles aboard the ship, stand watches, and help with Young Endeavour's operation. Near the end of the voyage, the crew undergoes "command day": a 24-hour period in which the ship is entirely under control of the youth crew. As part of most voyages, the combined crew takes a group of special needs youth on a half-day sail.

Between the scheme's inception in 1988 and mid-2018, over 13,500 youth have participated in voyages, while another 11,500 disabled youth have been involved in half-day sails. The vessel is at sea for approximately 240 days per year.

== Operational history ==
Young Endeavour left Australian waters for the first time in 1990, when she sailed to New Zealand for celebrations of the sesquicentennial of the Treaty of Waitangi's signing and the opening of the 1990 Commonwealth Games.

During 1992, the ship circumnavigated the world and participated in 500th anniversary celebrations of Christopher Columbus' round-the-world voyage.

In 1995, Young Endeavour circumnavigated Australia, and visited Indonesia for the nation's 50th anniversary of independence.

During 2001, as part of Centenary of Federation celebrations, the tall ship circumnavigated Australia.

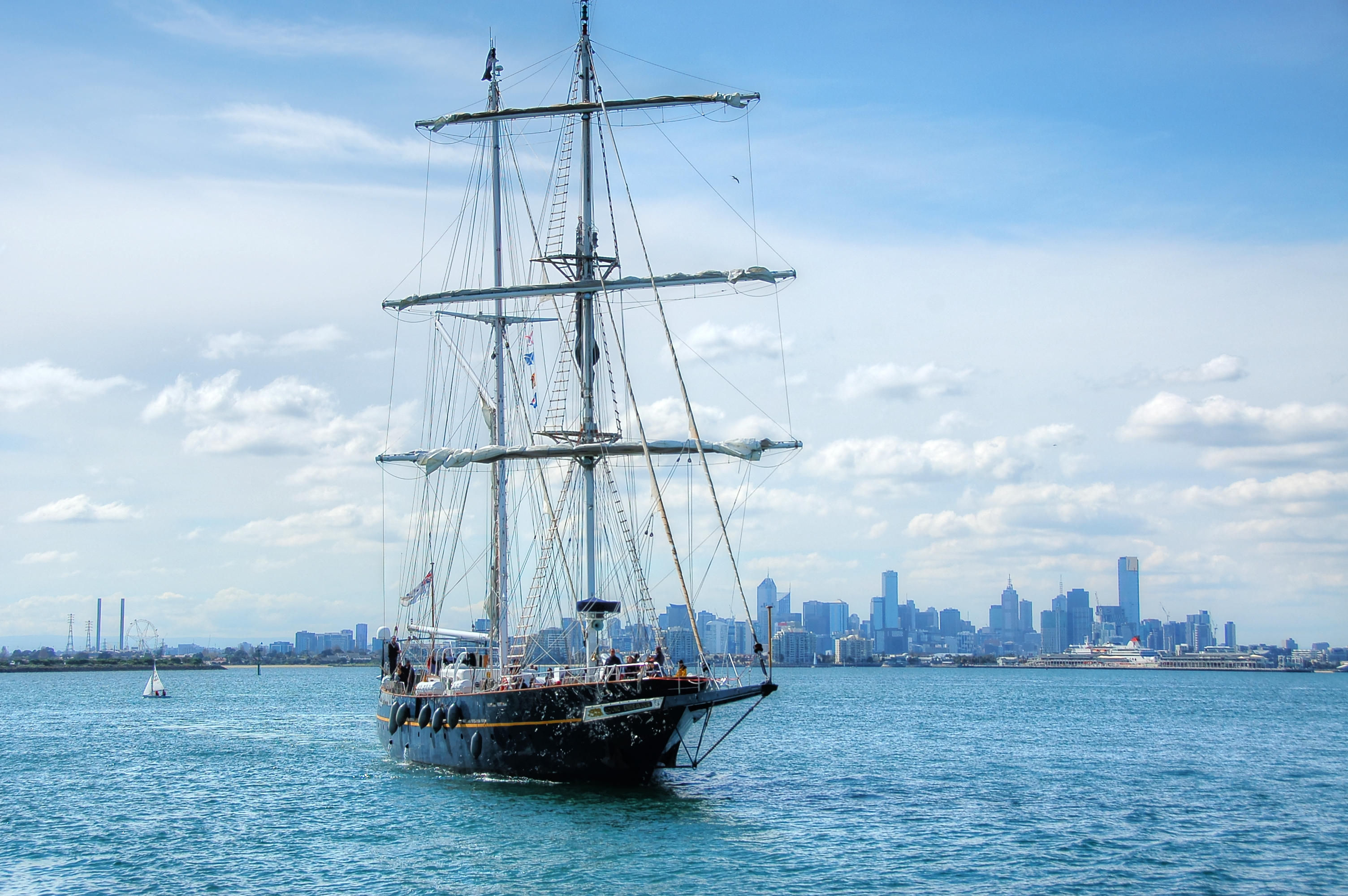
Young Endeavour off Melbourne in 2013

In 2006, Young Endeavour visited New Zealand.

Young Endeavour participated in the International Fleet Review 2013 in Sydney.

At the end of 2014, the ship departed Sydney for a round-the-world trip. The trip consists of eight separate voyages, each with a separate youth crew embarked: to Rio de Janeiro (the ship's 500th voyage), Cádiz, Çanakkale (with the third and fourth voyage crews aboard for the 100th Anzac Day dawn service off Gallipoli), Southampton (ending with a function hosting Young Endeavour's designer and delivery crew, followed by four weeks' maintenance in the ship's port of construction), Amsterdam (including competition in the 2015 Tall Ships' Race, and involvement in the Sail Bremerhaven and Sail Amsterdam festivals), back to Rio, and Cape Town, before concluding in Fremantle. The trip is due to conclude in late December 2015.

Young Endeavour is scheduled to be replaced with a new sail training ship, the Young Endeavour II, in 2023.
