= HMAS Kuttabul (naval base) =

Royal Australian Navy base

- Part of Fleet Base East
- Potts Point, Sydney, New South Wales in Australia
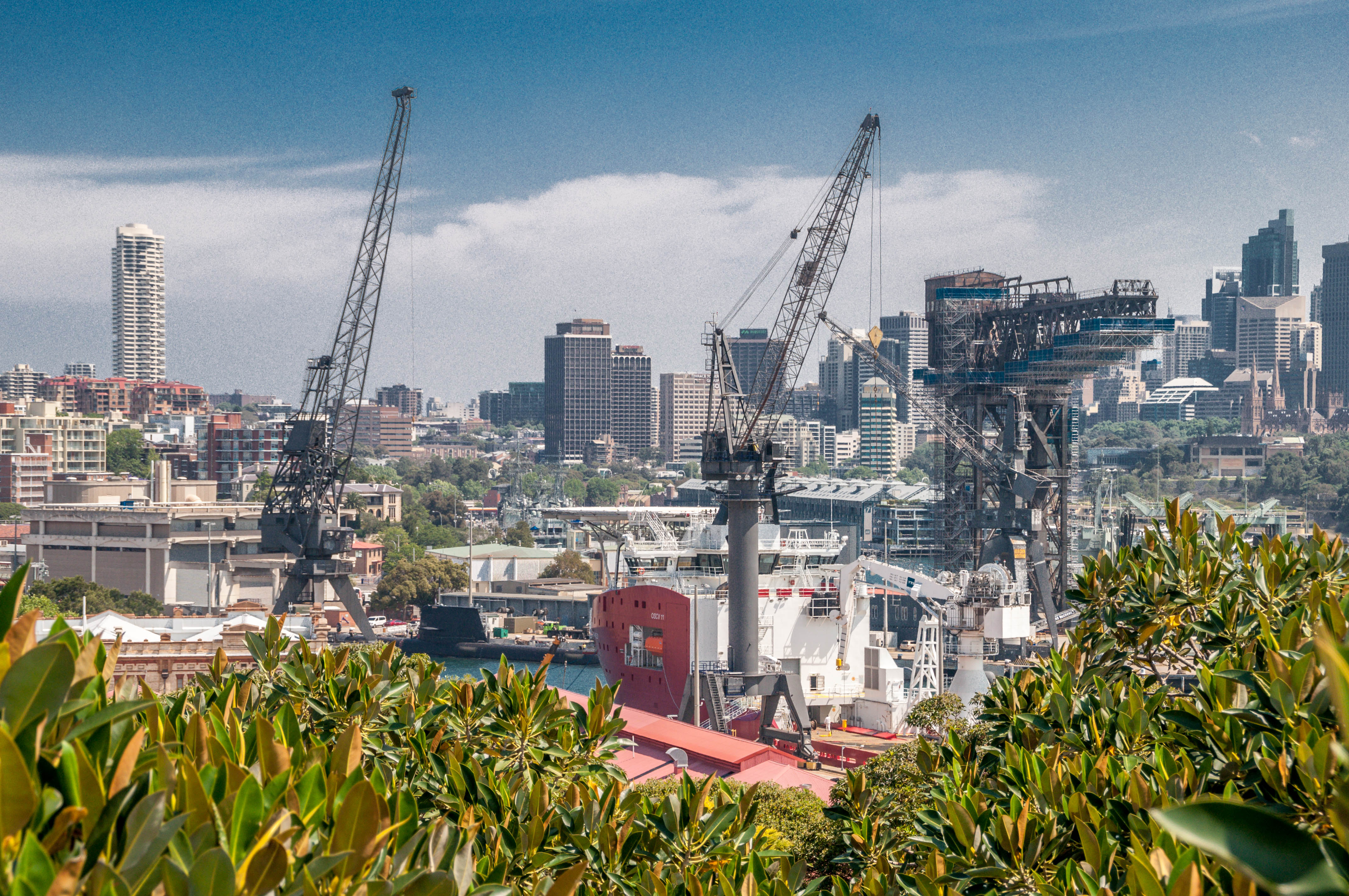
- Fleet Base East

- Coat of arms of HMAS Kuttabul

Site information
- Type: Naval base
- Owner: Department of Defence
- Operator: Royal Navy (1856–1911); Royal Australian Navy (1911–1967); Royal Australian Navy (1967 – present)

Location
- Location in Greater Sydney
- Coordinates: 33°51′45″S 151°13′36″E

Site history
- Built: 1856
- In use: 1856 – present
- Battles/wars: Attack on Sydney Harbour

Garrison information
- Current commander: Captain Viktor Piličić, CSC, RAN
- Past commanders: Commander Todd Wilson, RAN

HMAS Kuttabul is a Royal Australian Navy (RAN) base located in Potts Point in Sydney, New South Wales, Australia. Kuttabul provides administrative, training, logistics and accommodation support to naval personnel assigned to the various facilities that form Fleet Base East, the main operational navy base on the east coast of Australia. A part of Fleet Base East itself, Kuttabul occupies several buildings in the Sydney suburb of Potts Point and in the immediately adjacent Garden Island dockyard. It also supports navy personnel posted to other locations throughout the greater Sydney region.

The base is named for the steam ferry HMAS Kuttabul that was sunk while docked at Garden Island during a Japanese midget submarine attack on Sydney Harbour in 1942.

== History ==
Garden Island itself has been host to a naval base since 1856, when the government of New South Wales suggested giving the area over to the Royal Navy as a base for ships serving on the Australia Station. Following the foundation of the Royal Australian Navy in 1911, all naval establishments were given over by the UK to the RAN. However, until 1939, the ownership of Garden Island itself was in dispute, with NSW claiming it as its property. This was solved when the Australian government initially requisitioned the island (together with the naval base) under emergency wartime powers. The government then purchased Garden Island from NSW for £638,000 in 1945.

The Garden Island facility houses the Captain Cook Graving Dock which was, at the time of construction during World War II, the largest graving dock in the Southern Hemisphere. The dock was constructed between 1940 and 1945, by filling in the area between Garden Island and Potts Point. The dock and associated dockyard are operated under lease by Thales Australia. The northern tip of Garden Island is as of 2008 open to the public, accessible only by ferry. The area features the Navy Heritage Centre, opened in 2004, and graffiti dating to the First Fleet in 1788.

From its foundation until the establishment of the Two Ocean Policy and commissioning of HMAS Stirling in 1978, Kuttabul was the RAN's main naval base. With the establishment of two main bases, Kuttabul and Garden Island took on the additional designation of Fleet Base East.

== Facilities and operational units ==
Although Kuttabul is the main administrative part of Fleet Base East, Fleet Base East is also responsible for the Mine Counter Measures forces of the RAN stationed on the east coast. These are based at HMAS Waterhen.

=== Ships stationed ===
- Canberra-class amphibious assault ship
  - HMAS Adelaide
  - HMAS Canberra
- Bay-class landing ship, dock
  - HMAS Choules
- Supply-class auxiliary oiler replenishment
  - HMAS Supply
- Hobart-class destroyer, guided missile
  - HMAS Hobart
  - HMAS Brisbane
  - HMAS Sydney
- Anzac-class frigate, helicopter
  - HMAS Arunta
  - HMAS Warramunga
- Huon-class minehunter, coastal (at Waterhen)
  - HMAS Diamantina
  - HMAS Yarra
- STS Young Endeavour, sail training ship (at Waterhen)

== Gallery ==
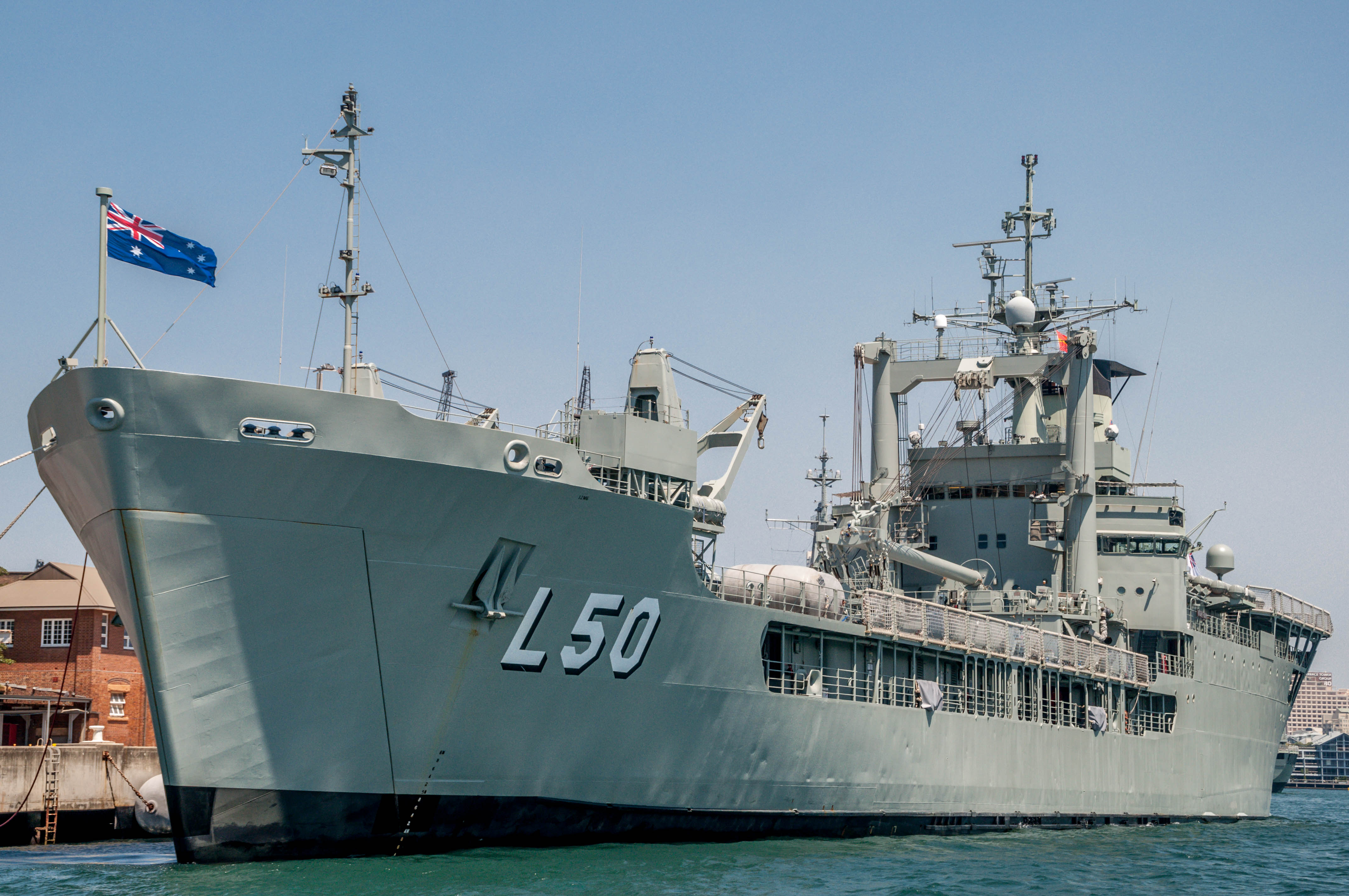
HMAS Tobruk alongside at Fleet Base East in 2013

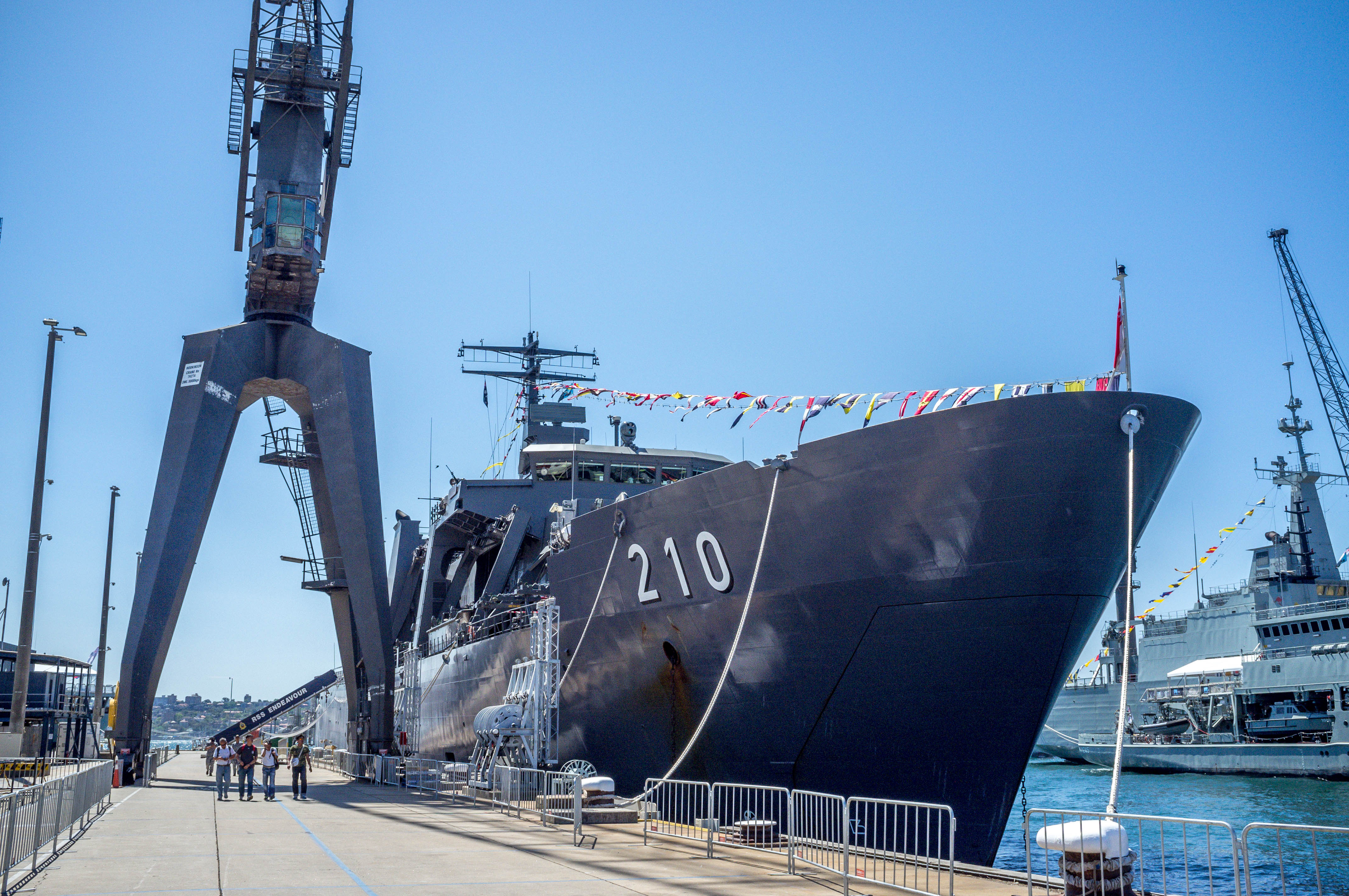
RSS Endeavour visiting Garden Island during the International Fleet Review 2013

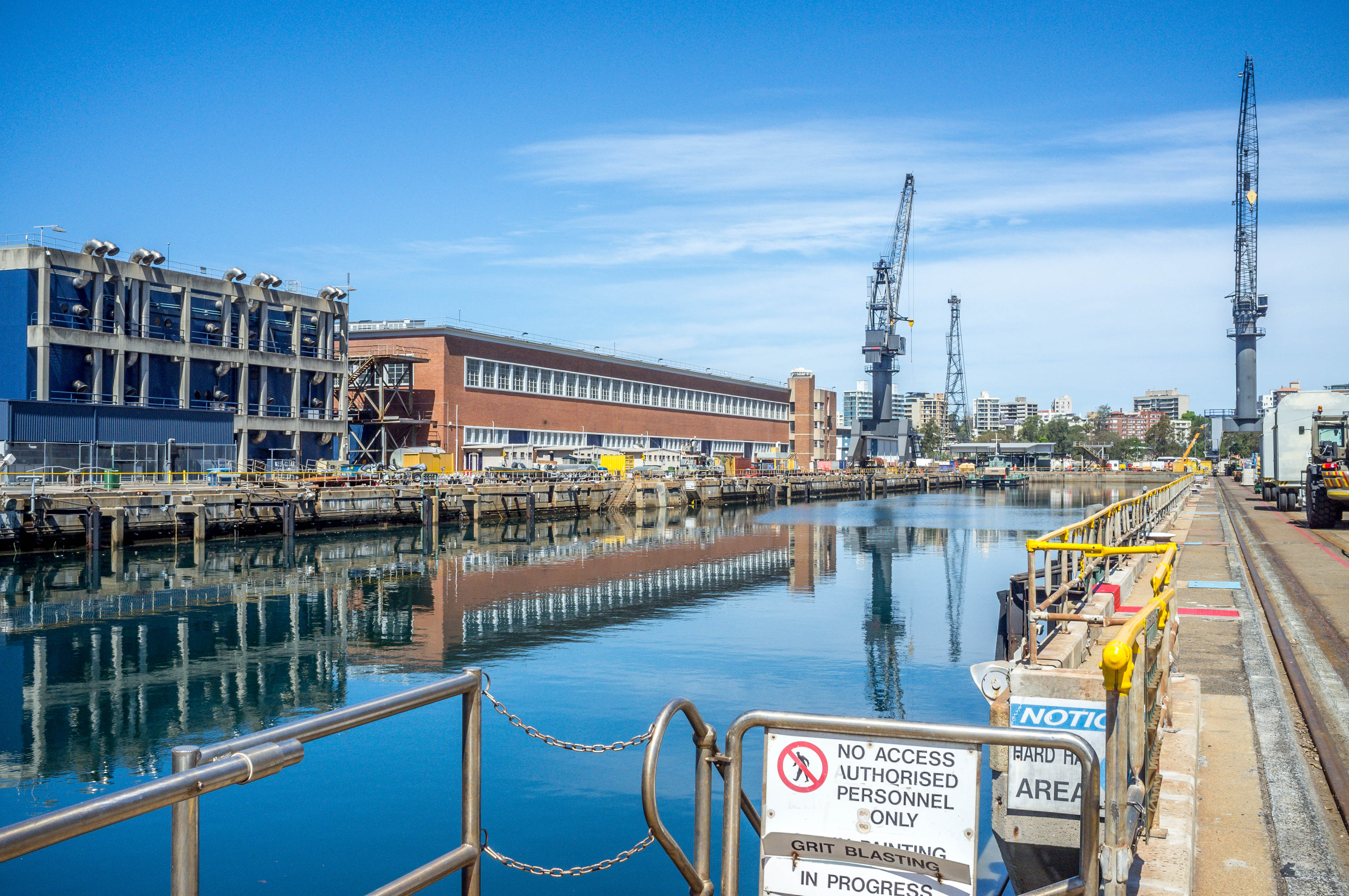
Captain Cook Dock, Garden Island

== See also ==
- List of Royal Australian Navy bases
- Naval Base Sydney
