= Fleet Base East =

Naval installation

- Near Sydney, New South Wales in Australia
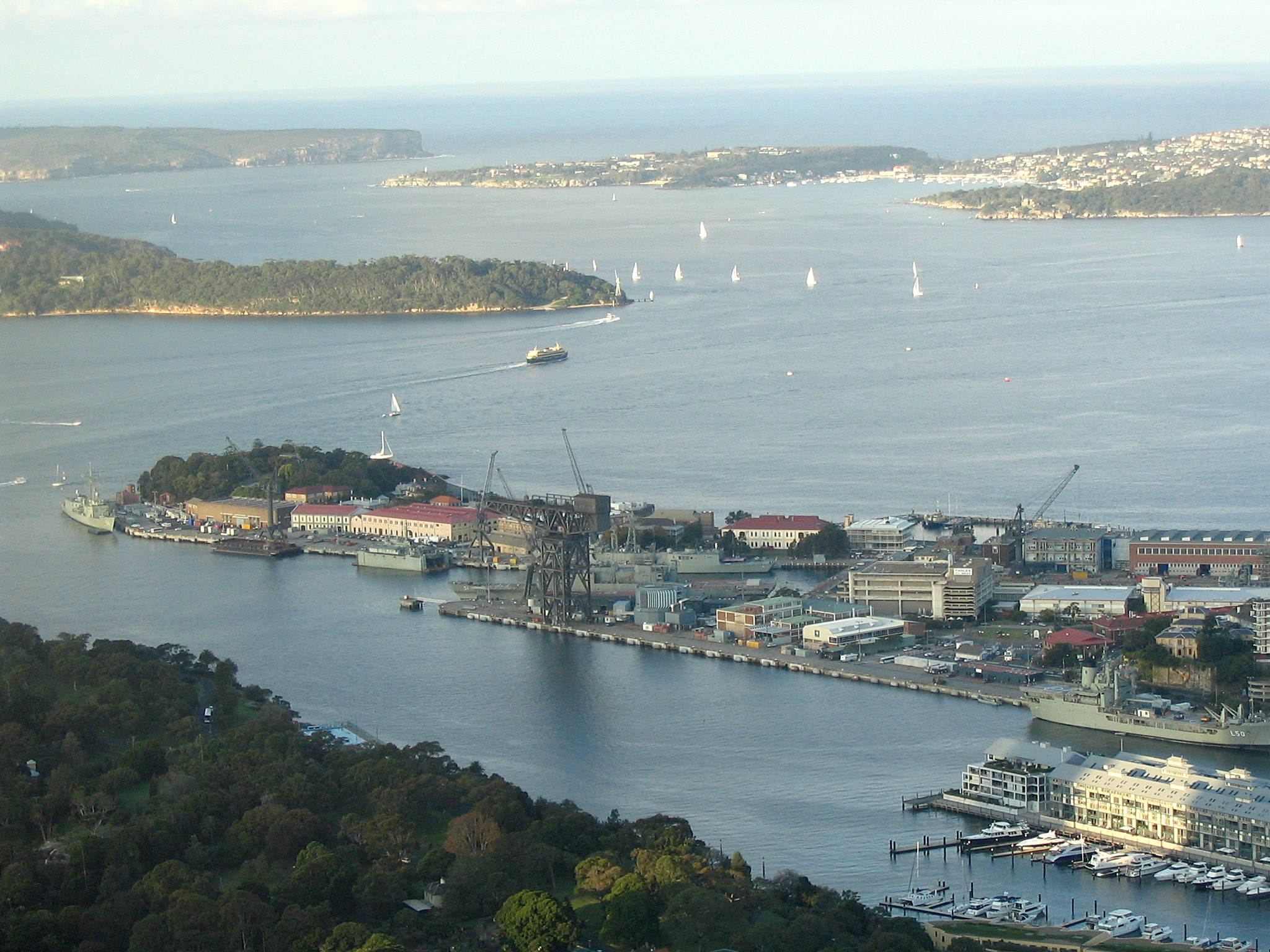
- Garden Island, a major part of Fleet Base East

Site information
- Type: Major fleet base
- Owner: Department of Defence
- Operator: Royal Navy (1788–1911); Royal Australian Navy (1911–1967); Royal Australian Navy (1967 – present)
- Constituent bases and facilities: HMAS Kuttabul; Garden Island dockyard; HMAS Waterhen

Location
- Shown within Greater Sydney Fleet Base East (Australia)
- Coordinates: 33°51′50″S 151°13′31″E

Site history
- In use: Various bases and units (1788 - 1987); Fleet Base East (1987 – present)

Fleet Base East is a Royal Australian Navy (RAN) major fleet base that comprises several naval establishments and facilities clustered around Sydney Harbour, centred on HMAS Kuttabul. Fleet Base East extends beyond the borders of Kuttabul and includes the commercially-operated dockyard at Garden Island, and adjacent wharf facilities at nearby Woolloomooloo, east of the Sydney central business district in New South Wales, Australia. Fleet Base East is one of two major facilities of the RAN, the other facility being Fleet Base West. The fleet operates in the Pacific Ocean.

Confusingly, naval personnel often use the term Fleet Base East to mean the naval wharves at Garden Island where ships assigned to the Fleet Base usually berth but the official designation includes several other bases and facilities as well.

== History ==
Sydney was considered the centre of naval activity in Australia from the arrival of the First Fleet in 1788. Over the course of the 19th century the Royal Navy developed facilities around Sydney Harbour, most notably at Garden Island. Those facilities passed to the newly formed Royal Australian Navy in 1911 and Sydney became home port to the Australian Fleet. During World War II there was significant expansion of the naval facilities around Sydney Harbour, including a large expansion of the dockyards at Garden Island. After World War II, Australia began to have growing interests in the Indian Ocean areas to the west of Australia and the need for a major base on the west coast of the continent was identified. This resulted in the eventual construction during the 1970s of HMAS Stirling, near Perth in Western Australia. In 1987 the decision was taken to permanently split the basing of the Australian Fleet. The collection of facilities and bases on Sydney Harbour was designated Fleet Base East while Stirling was designated Fleet Base West.

Thales Australia has successfully operated at the Garden Island dockyards since the early 1980s and in 2014 signed a further five-year contract with the Department of Defence to provide ongoing dock operations and services, as well as ship repair and maintenance services at Garden Island.

During the 2013 federal election campaign, Prime Minister Kevin Rudd proposed that under a Labor government, the Sydney-based facilities of Fleet Base East would be relocated further north, with options of Queensland and the Northern Territory suggested. However, by 2017 and following the release of the 2016 Defence White Paper, a A$213 million upgrade of the Garden Island dockyards were proposed. However, the white paper also stated that they are planning to come up with a long-term solution to space constraints at HMAS Kuttabul.

== Constituent bases and facilities ==
Fleet Base East is home to more than sixty per cent of Australia’s surface fleet and comprises:

- HMAS Kuttabul – the shore establishment that provides administrative, logistical, training and accommodation support to Fleet Base East. It is located in Potts Point, immediately adjacent to Garden Island. It also supports naval personnel assigned to other duties throughout the greater Sydney region.
- Garden Island – the largest historic naval area on Sydney Harbour, with use going back to the founding of the colony in 1788. Greatly expanded during World War II, it now comprises major dockyard facilities run by a civilian operator, the naval wharves used by major fleet units of the RAN, various training facilities under the control of HMAS Kuttabul and a heritage precinct, open to the public, that includes the official museum of the Royal Australian Navy.
- HMAS Waterhen – a smaller base on another part of Sydney Harbour. It is home to the RAN Mine Warfare and Clearance Diving Group and has berthing facilities for the RAN's coastal mine hunting ships and other smaller vessels.

== Former constituent bases ==
HMAS Platypus, located in Neutral Bay on the northern side of Sydney Harbour, was the home base for the Royal Australian Navy Submarine Service and its fleet of six Oberon class submarines from 1967. It closed in 1999 when the submarine fleet moved to Fleet Base West to coincide with the introduction of new Collins class submarines.

HMAS Rushcutter was a small base at Rushcutters Bay, on the southern side of Sydney Harbour. Used for a variety of training and small boat operations, it closed in 1979.

== Ships stationed ==
The following vessels are stationed at Fleet Base East:

Canberra-class landing helicopter dock

- HMAS Canberra
- HMAS Adelaide

Anzac-class frigate

- HMAS Warramunga
- HMAS Arunta

Hobart-class destroyer

- HMAS Hobart
- HMAS Brisbane
- HMAS Sydney

Bay-class landing ship

- HMAS Choules

Supply-class replenishment oiler

- HMAS Supply

Huon-class minehunters (at Waterhen)

- HMAS Diamantina
- HMAS Yarra

Multi-role Aircraft Training Vessel (at Waterhen)

- MV Sycamore

Sail training (at Waterhen)

- STS Young Endeavour

== See also ==
- List of Royal Australian Navy bases
