= STS Young Endeavour =

Two tall ships of the Royal Australian Navy (RAN) have been named STS Young Endeavour.

- STS Young Endeavour (1987), a brigantine launched in 1987 and transferred to the Royal Australian Navy in 1988.
- STS Young Endeavour II, a barquentine that is under construction and due to be handed over to the Royal Australian Navy in 2024.
