= Garden Island (New South Wales) =

Locality in Sydney, New South Wales, Australia

Coordinates: 33°51′58″S 151°13′31″E

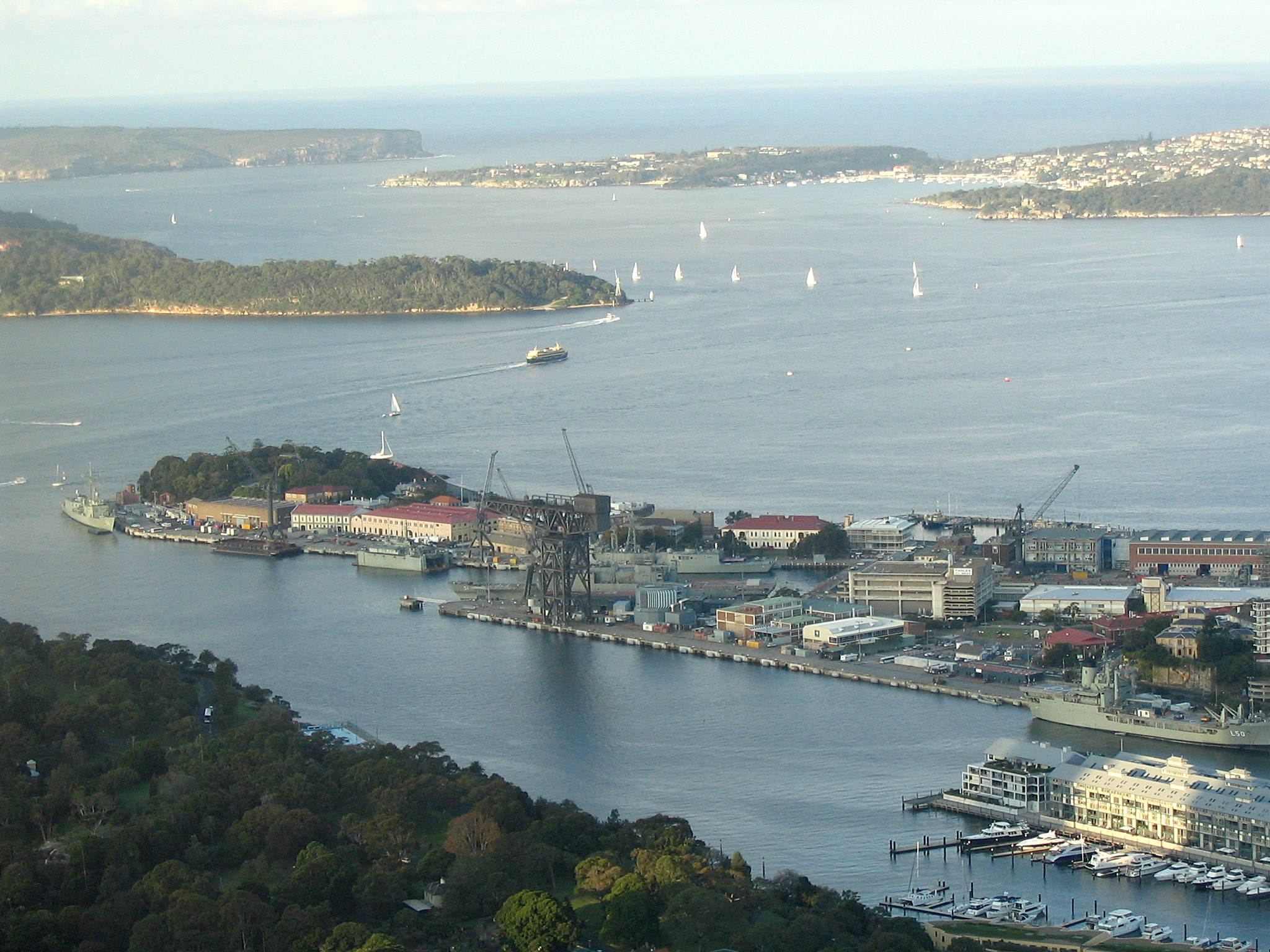
- Garden Island from Sydney Tower, in 2007
- Country: Australia
- State: New South Wales
- City: Sydney
- LGA: City of Sydney
- Location: 2 km (1.2 mi) north-east of Sydney CBD
- Postcode: 2000
Localities around Garden Island
	Port Jackson
Sydney CBD	Garden Island	Darling Point
Woolloomooloo	Potts Point	Elizabeth Bay

Garden Island is an inner-city locality of Sydney, Australia, and the location of a major Royal Australian Navy (RAN) base. It is located to the north-east of the Sydney central business district and juts out into Port Jackson, immediately to the north of the suburb of Potts Point. Used for government and naval purposes since the earliest days of the colony of Sydney, it was originally a completely-detached island but was joined to the Potts Point shoreline by major land reclamation work during World War II.

Today, Garden Island forms a major part of the RAN's Fleet Base East. It includes active dockyards (including the Captain Cook Graving Dock), naval wharves and a naval heritage and museum precinct. Approximately half of the major fleet units of the RAN use the wharves as their home port.

The northern tip of Garden Island is open to the public and formerly contained the Royal Australian Navy Heritage Centre museum, which was closed permanently in 2021, and an outdoor heritage precinct. Immediately south and above Garden Island on the Potts Point ridgeline is HMAS Kuttabul, the RAN's major administrative, training and logistics support establishment for the Sydney area. Although HMAS Kuttabul is administratively a separate facility to Garden Island, the two names are often referred to interchangeably.

== Geography ==
Garden Island was originally an island in Sydney Harbour, but extension of the base and the construction of a dry dock in the channel between the island and the mainland have resulted in its connection to the mainland shore at Potts Point from the 1940s. The wharves of the naval base now stretch the length of the eastern side of Woolloomooloo Bay, from the suburb of Woolloomooloo to the end of the original island.

== History ==
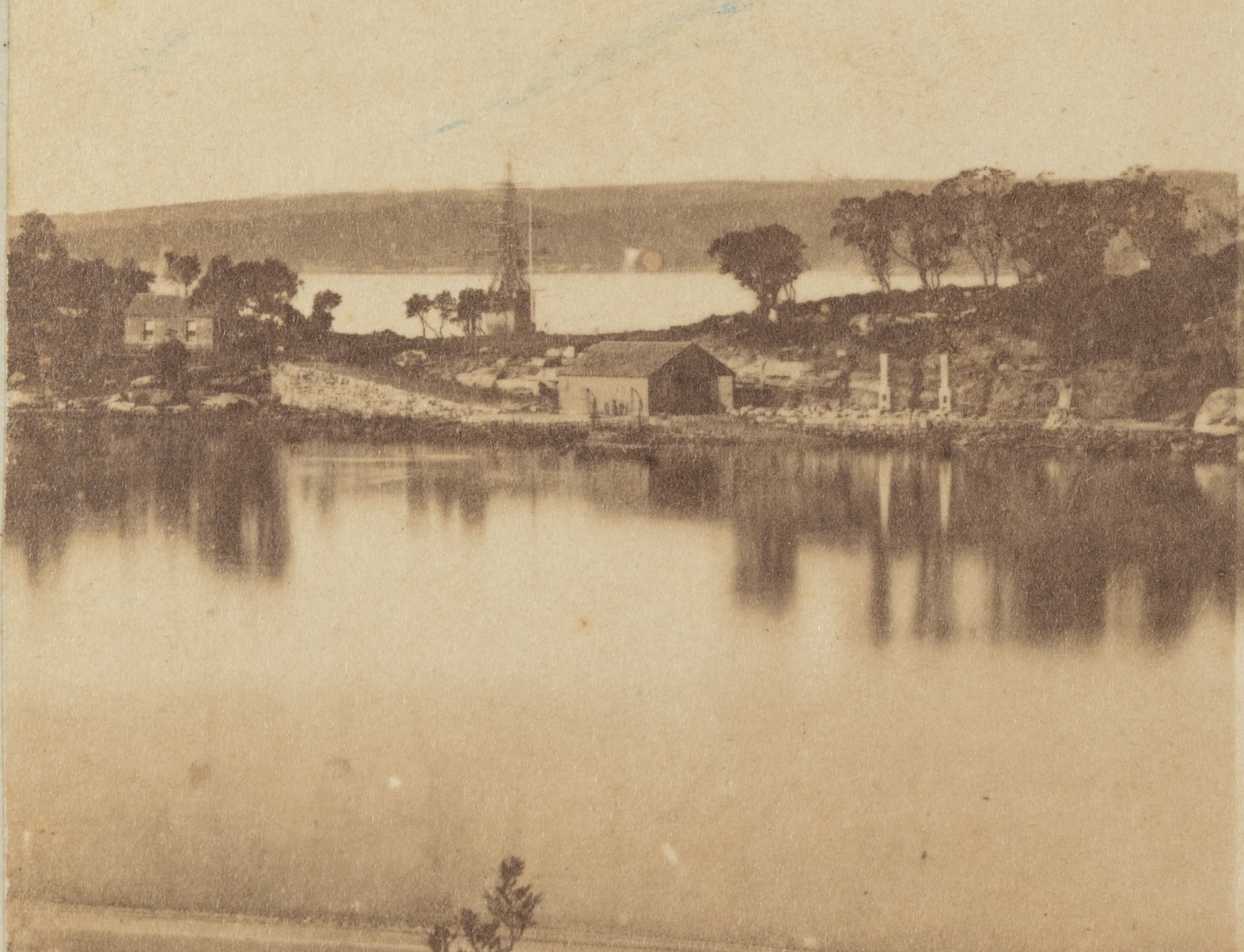
Garden Island ca. 1858 SLNSW FL657041

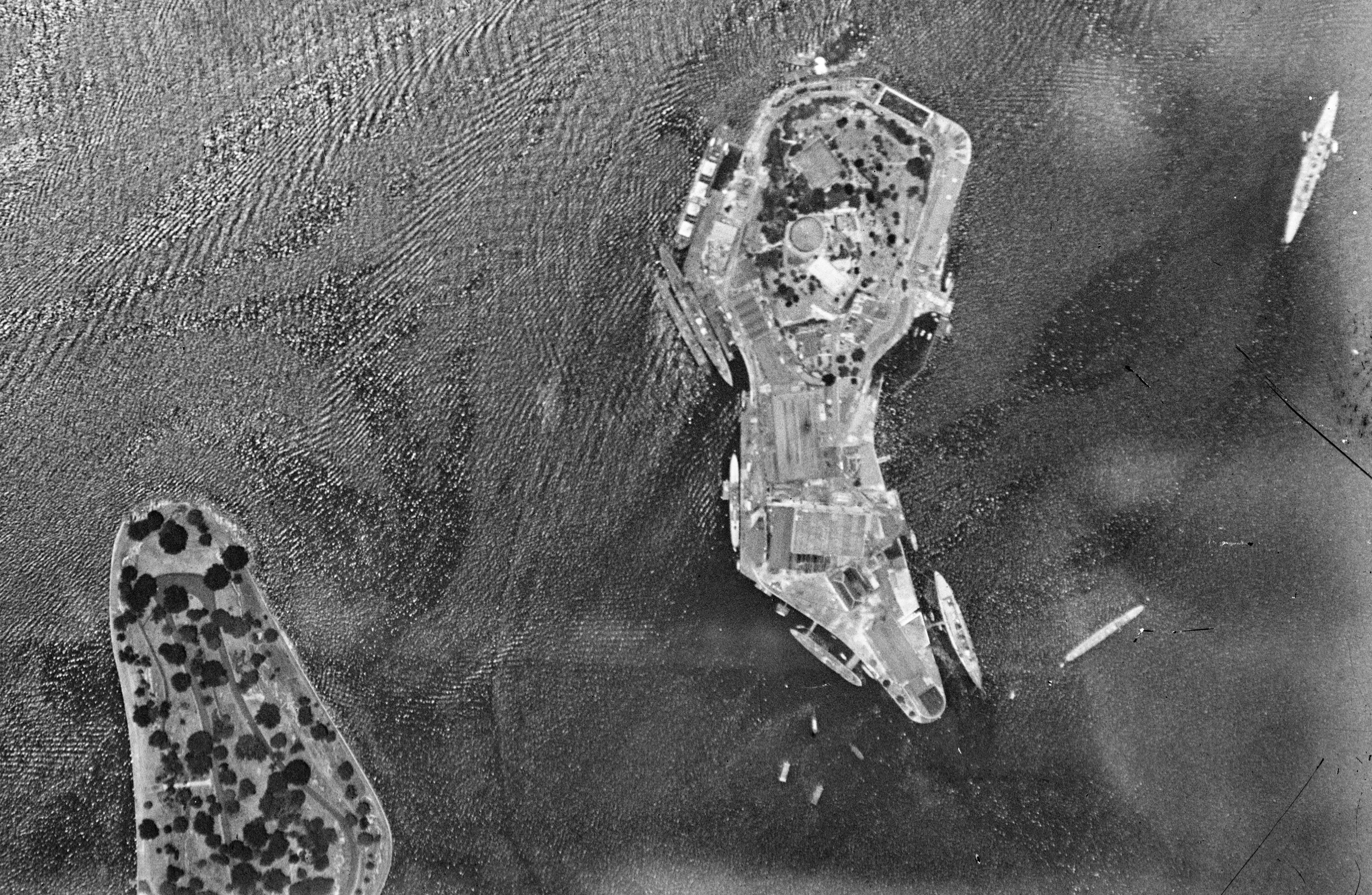
Aerial photograph of RAN depot, Garden Island, Sydney, c. 1930

'Bayinguwa' is the First Nations name for a small island at the end of Woolloomooloo Bay in Port Jackson Harbour.- It was renamed Garden Island in 1788 after it was planted in the first months of European settlement in Australia, to serve as a kitchen-garden by officers and crew of the First Fleet vessel HMS Sirius. Initials carved into a sandstone rock on the site are believed to be the oldest colonial graffiti in Australia, comprising the letters "FM 1788," representing Frederick Meredith who served as Sirius' steward. On 7 September 1811, ownership of Garden Island was declared to have transferred to the Governor's estate with produce dedicated for the exclusive use of Government House. The transfer had practical effect but due to an administrative error it was not formally registered, leaving the land in the legal ownership of the Navy, which successfully sought its return in 1866.

Sandstone fortifications, built on the island during the 1820s to protect Sydney from a much-feared Russian attack, also survive. Garden Island also boasts what is claimed to be Australia's first lawn tennis court. Built in 1880, it is still in use, although the lawn was replaced in 1960.

=== Captain Cook Graving Dock ===
Prior to World War II, the nearest sizable naval graving dock was at Singapore Naval Base; an 8,000-nautical-mile (15,000 km; 9,200 mi) round trip for a potentially damaged warship. Consequently, in 1938, the Australian cabinet approved the idea of building a large naval graving dock. The cost of construction was predicted at around A£3 million. A far cheaper alternative, a second-hand floating drydock being sold by Southern Railway was considered early on. Despite the A£175,000 cost, the acquisition was opposed by Admiral Ragnar Colvin, as it would be expensive and difficult to maintain, would be unable to accommodate the draught of ships being acquired for the RAN, and would be incredibly risky to tow from England to Australia. Three sites were considered (one in Adelaide, and two in Sydney Harbour: Potts Point or near the Sydney Harbour Bridge), with Potts Point chosen as the cheapest location. The dock itself was built by the reclamation of 30 acres (12 ha) of land, connecting Garden Island to the mainland.

By September 1944, work had been completed to the stage where initial flooding tests could occur. On 2 March 1945, the British aircraft carrier HMS Illustrious underwent an emergency docking: although the drydock was not due to open for another three weeks, the advanced state of building made the docking possible. The Captain Cook Graving Dock was formally opened by Prince Henry, Duke of Gloucester in his role as the Governor-General of Australia, with the ribbon cutting performed by the bow of the frigate HMAS Lachlan. During the first year of operations, the drydock received the British battleship HMS Anson; the 45,360-ton displacement warship is the largest vessel to use the dock.

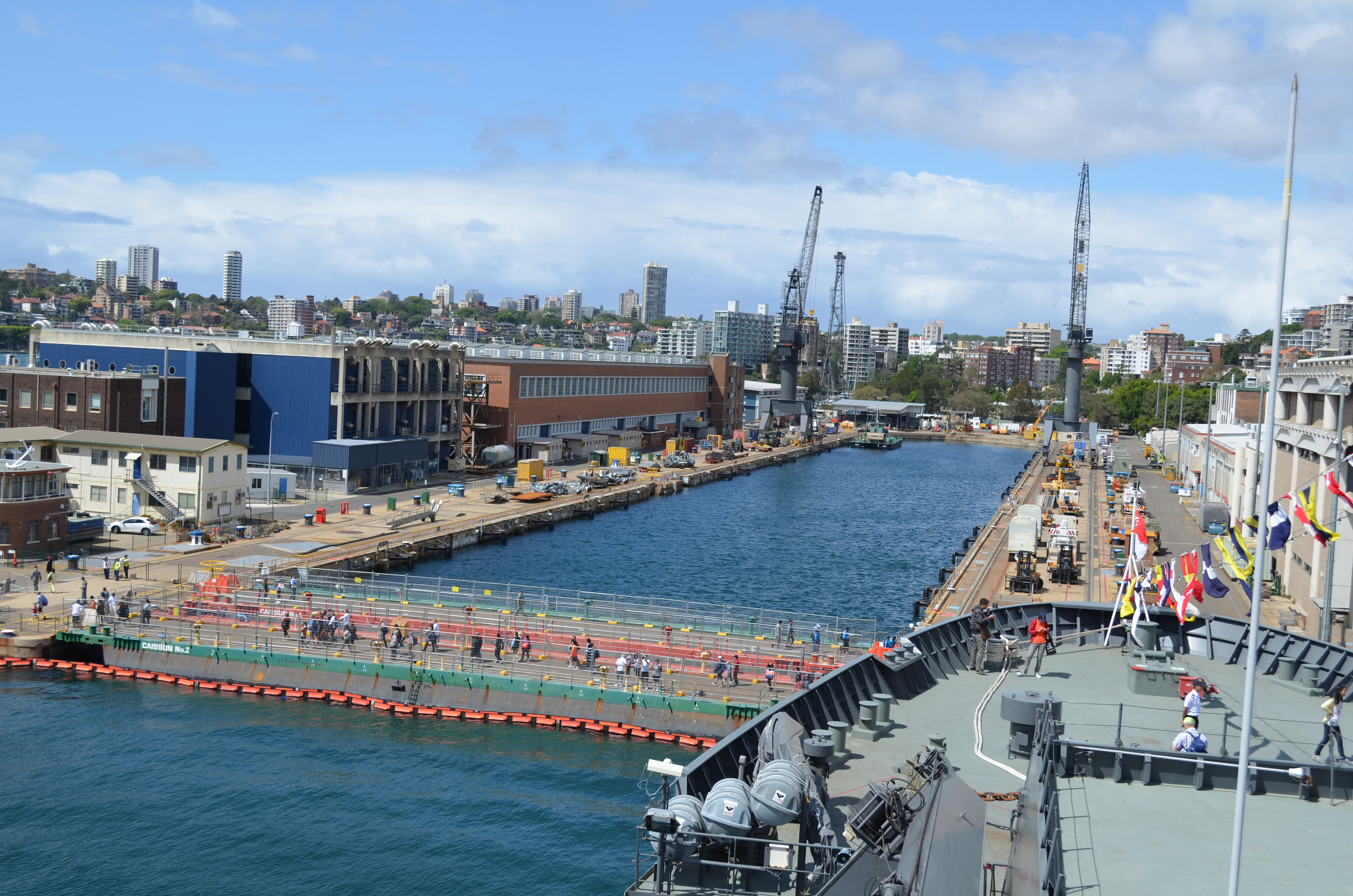
Captain Cook Graving Dock when flooded

The dock is 1,139 feet 5 inches (347.29 m) long, with a width of 147 feet 7.5 inches (44.996 m). The dock is 45 feet (14 m) deep at spring tide. When filled, the dock has a capacity of 50,000,000 imperial gallons (230,000,000 L; 60,000,000 US gal). The dock can be drained in a four-hour period through the use of three 60-inch (1,500 mm) centrifugal pumps (each with a discharge capacity around 70,500 imperial gallons (320,000 L; 84,700 US gal) per minute).

=== Hammerhead crane ===
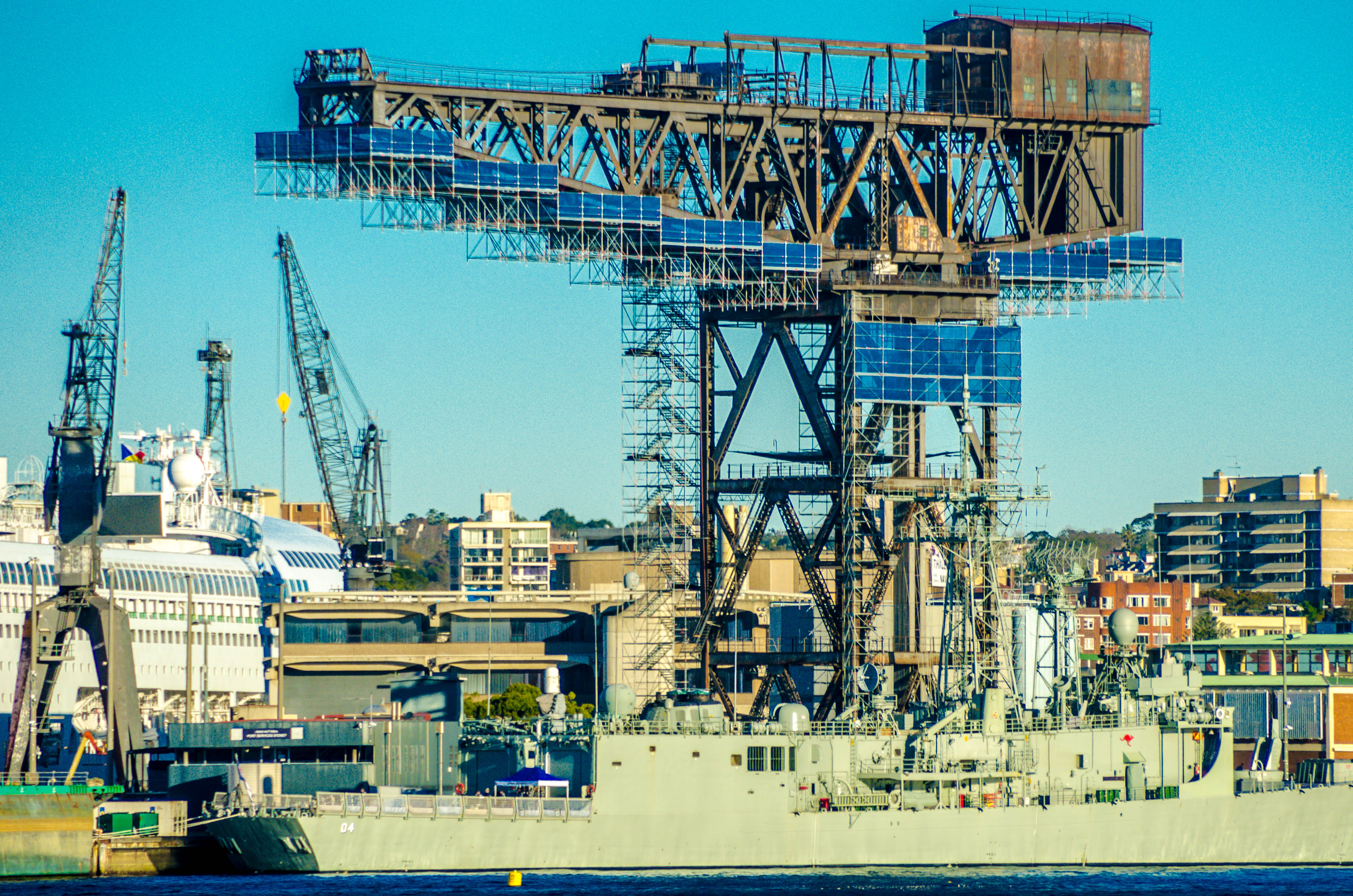
Hammerhead Crane prior to removal

The hammerhead crane was built between 1944 and 1951 on the Fitting Out Wharf at Garden Island. The electrically powered crane had a radius of 131 feet (40 m) and a total height of 203 feet (62 m). The electrical and mechanical equipment was sourced from England, while the steel frame was fabricated in Sydney. Although officially declared completed in January 1952, the crane was operational from March 1951. The crane's primary purpose was the removal and installation of warship gun turrets, although it was regularly used for other machinery and loads, and had a lifting capacity of up to 250 tonnes (250 long tons; 280 short tons). It was last used in 1996.

In August 2013, the Federal Government announced the removal of the hammerhead crane, at an estimated cost of $10.3 million. Other options, such as preserving the crane as a heritage structure and tourist attraction, restoring it to working order, or converting it to a new purpose, were ruled out due to cost and the risk to security at the naval base. The removal was also seen as necessary to free up wharf space for the Canberra-class amphibious warfare ships. The Hammerhead Crane was the largest crane in the southern hemisphere on completion, and as of 2005, was still the largest crane in Australia. At the time of its demolition, it was only 15 cranes of that style worldwide. Removal was completed by November 2014, with some components preserved for heritage purposes.

=== Tunnel system ===
There is a tunnel system under Garden Island that was once used by the Royal Australian Navy. Within this tunnel system was a power station, offices and air raid shelters. This tunnel complex also had a command centre. Other tunnels also exist which headed further in towards Kings Cross. The island also has a pit that was built in the 1800s and was used as a storage facility in case the island was ever attacked. The entrance to this pit has now been sealed.

== Current usage ==
=== Dockyard ===
The dockyard facilities are today leased to and operated by the defence contractor Thales Australia, a part of the international Thales Group. They are used to service naval and civilian vessels.

=== Wharves ===
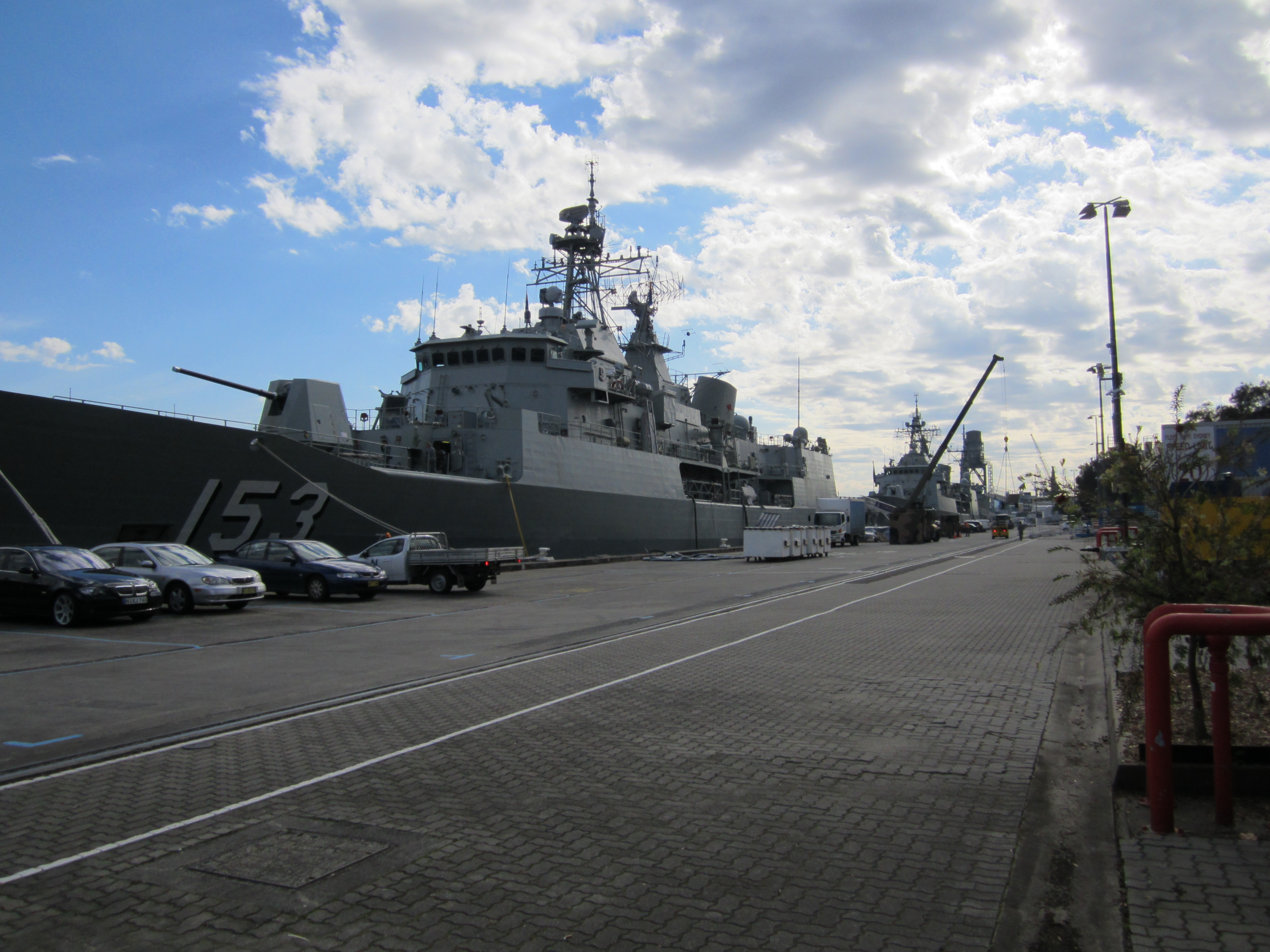
Two Anzac-class frigates at Garden Island

The various wharves that line Garden Island remain under the control of the navy and are used as the home port facilities for about half the Royal Australian Navy's major ships. The wharves on the western side of the island have sufficient depth of water to berth the largest United States Navy aircraft carriers.

=== Royal Australian Navy Heritage Centre ===
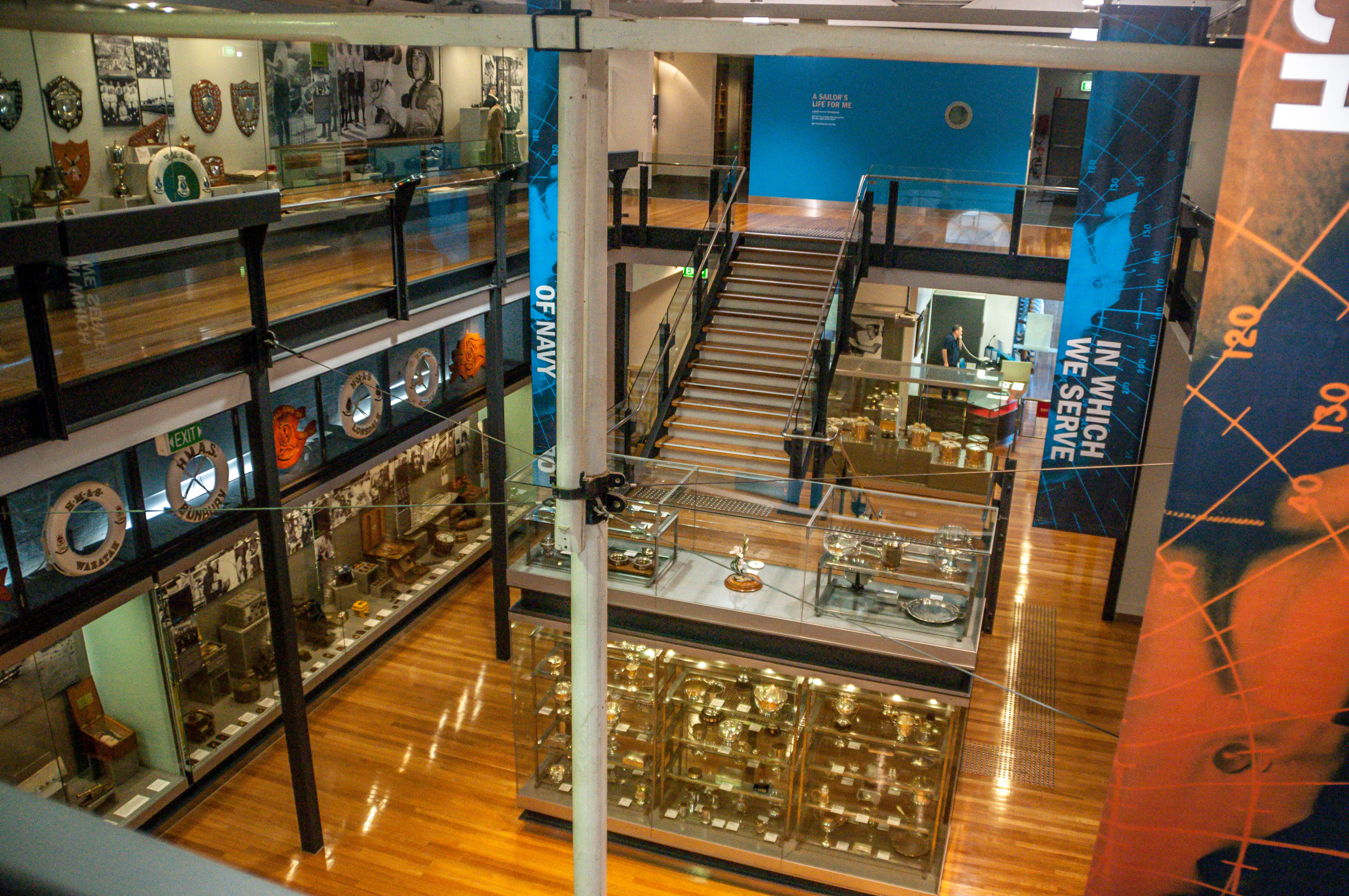
Royal Australian Navy Heritage Centre

The Royal Australian Navy Heritage Centre was opened in 2005 and is the official museum of the Royal Australian Navy. It is located in the Public Access Precinct of Garden Island: a section at the northern end of the island opened in 2002 that includes several heritage buildings and structures, historical relics, and naval monuments. The museum's exhibits include the conning tower from one of the Japanese midget submarines that attacked Sydney Harbour in 1942. The heritage precinct is isolated from the mainland by the naval and dockyard facilities, with public access limited to the Sydney Ferries service between Circular Quay and Double Bay, with the Garden Island ferry wharf at the north end of the island. Private pre-booked bus groups are allowed to transit through the naval base and dockyard to the heritage precinct under strict conditions.

=== Other facilities ===
Various workshops and other buildings on the island are under the control of the nearby HMAS Kuttabul naval base and are used for training and other logistical purposes.

== Proposed future usage ==
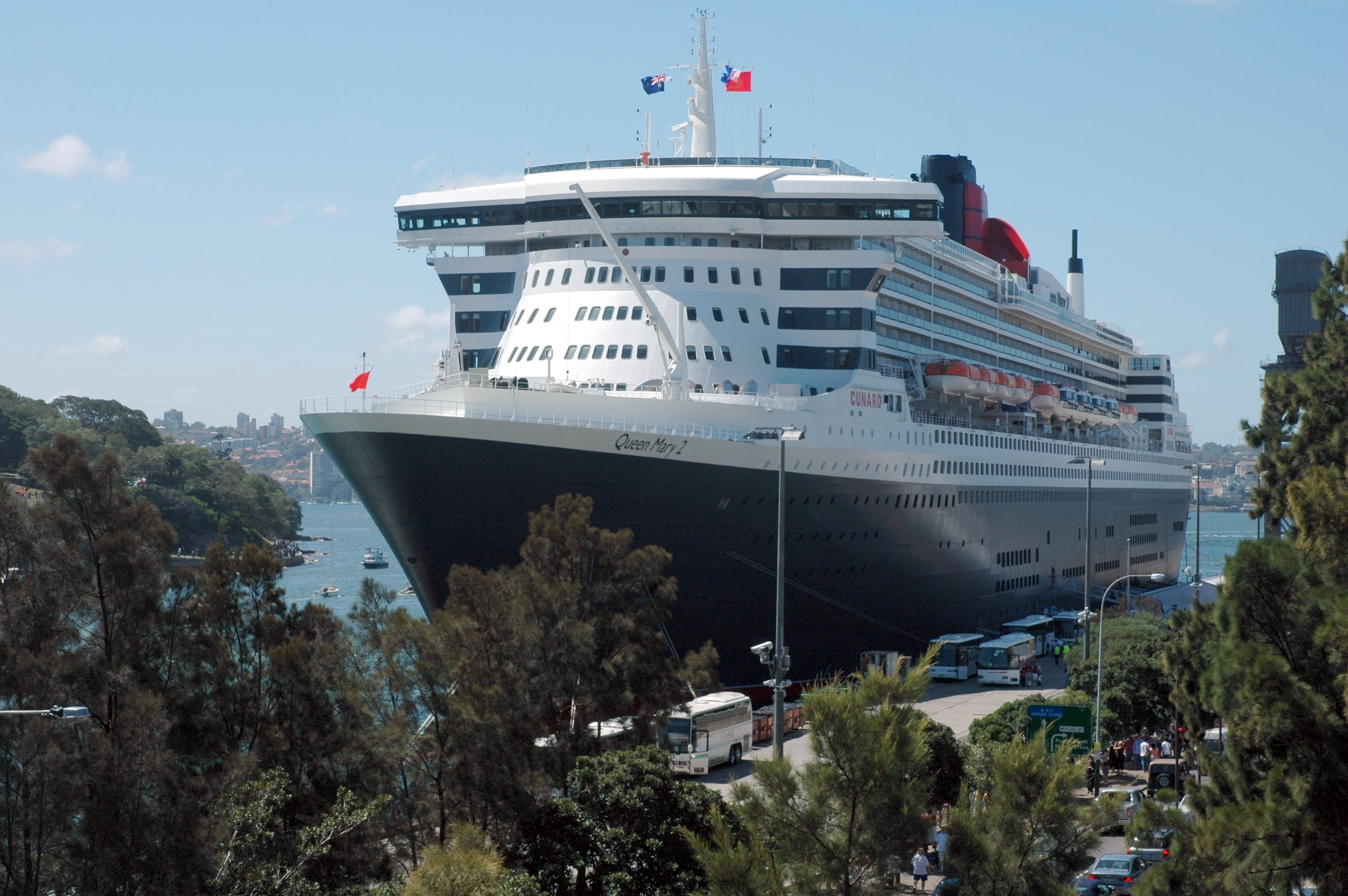
Queen Mary 2 berthed at the Garden Island naval wharves in 2007

Since 2000 the global cruising industry has been building a number of very large ships, some of which were too large to berth at the Overseas Passenger Terminal at Circular Quay, although modifications were made in 2014 to accommodate some larger vessels. Some large ships are permitted to berth at Garden Island's naval wharves, initially on an ad-hoc basis, followed in 2012 by an agreement to permit three cruise ships to berth per year. There have been calls for increased cruise ship access to the naval wharves, with some suggesting that the RAN should relocate entirely. Replacing the naval base with a cruise ship terminal would also free up the island to be redeveloped as harbourfront residential housing.

The RAN and the Department of Defence have opposed these proposals due to the security risks and loss of capability the increased civilian presence would bring, and the enormous cost of replicating the existing capability at a new location (a 2013 defence white paper estimated a cost of over $6 billion, although naval personnel stated that this did not include the creation of support facilities like the graving dock, or relocating supporting companies and industries like Thales). Most of the potential locations for a replacement base would require large-scale, ongoing dredging works to allow access to large naval ships, and have narrow access channels which could be easily blocked in wartime.

== Historic buildings and structures ==
The first naval buildings on the site were minor structures, but in the 1880s the Admiralty (with financial incentives from the Government of New South Wales) began to invest more heavily in the site as a base for the Royal Navy in the southern hemisphere. A number of sizeable buildings were constructed (several designed by James Barnet) providing accommodation, office space, stores of various kinds and a sizeable steam engineering factory. These were later taken over by the Royal Australian Navy, and most remain in use today.

== Heritage listings ==
Garden Island has a number of heritage-listed sites, including:

- Cowper Wharf Roadway: Sydney Harbour Naval Precinct

== Gallery ==
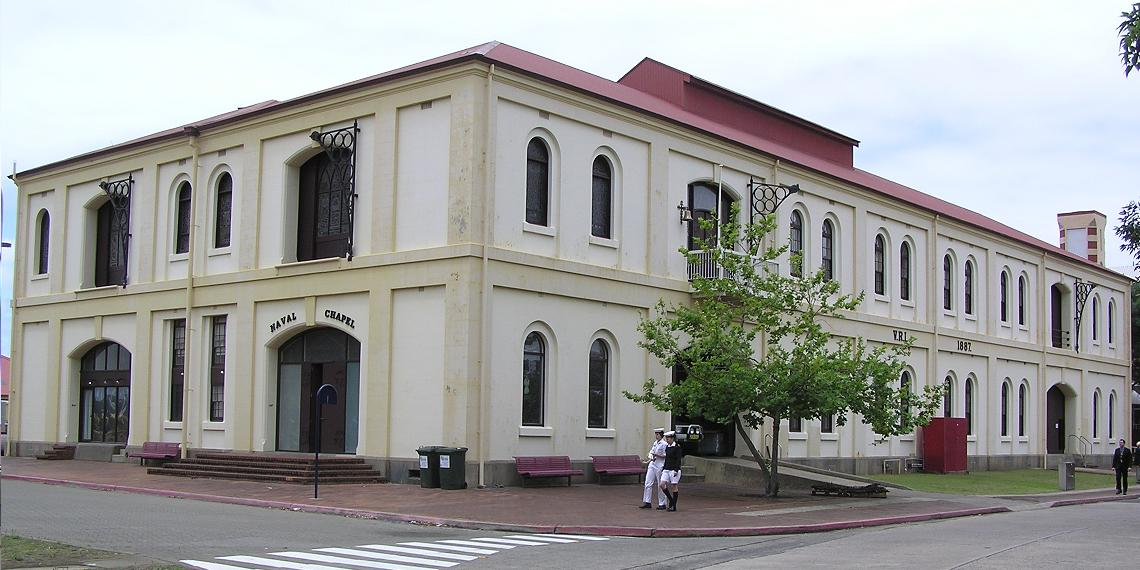
Rigging House of 1887 (boat shed below, sail loft above partly converted into a chapel in 1902)

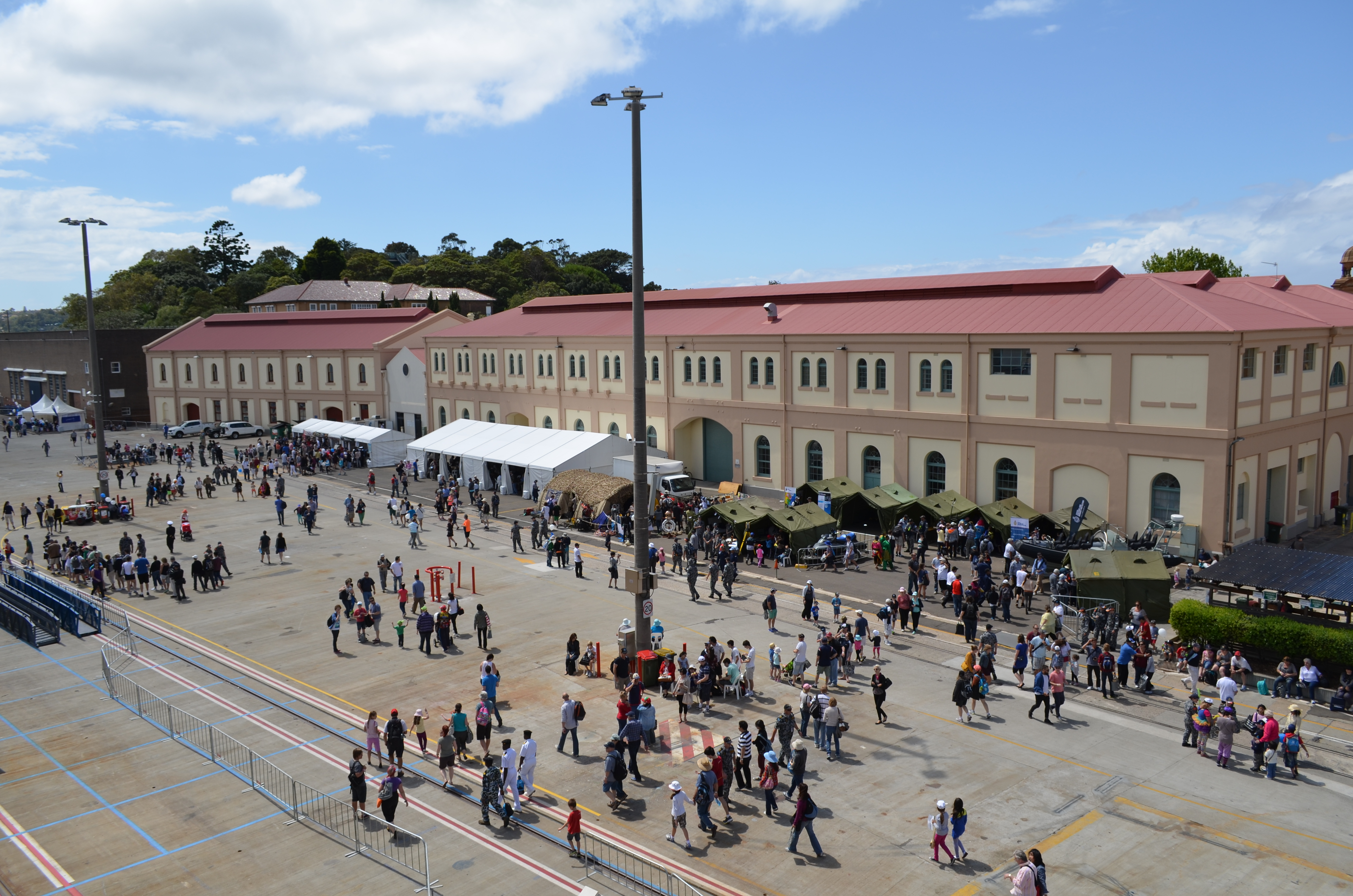
Interconnected Spar Shed/Torpedo Store (left), Sawmill (centre) and Steam Factory (right) of 1889

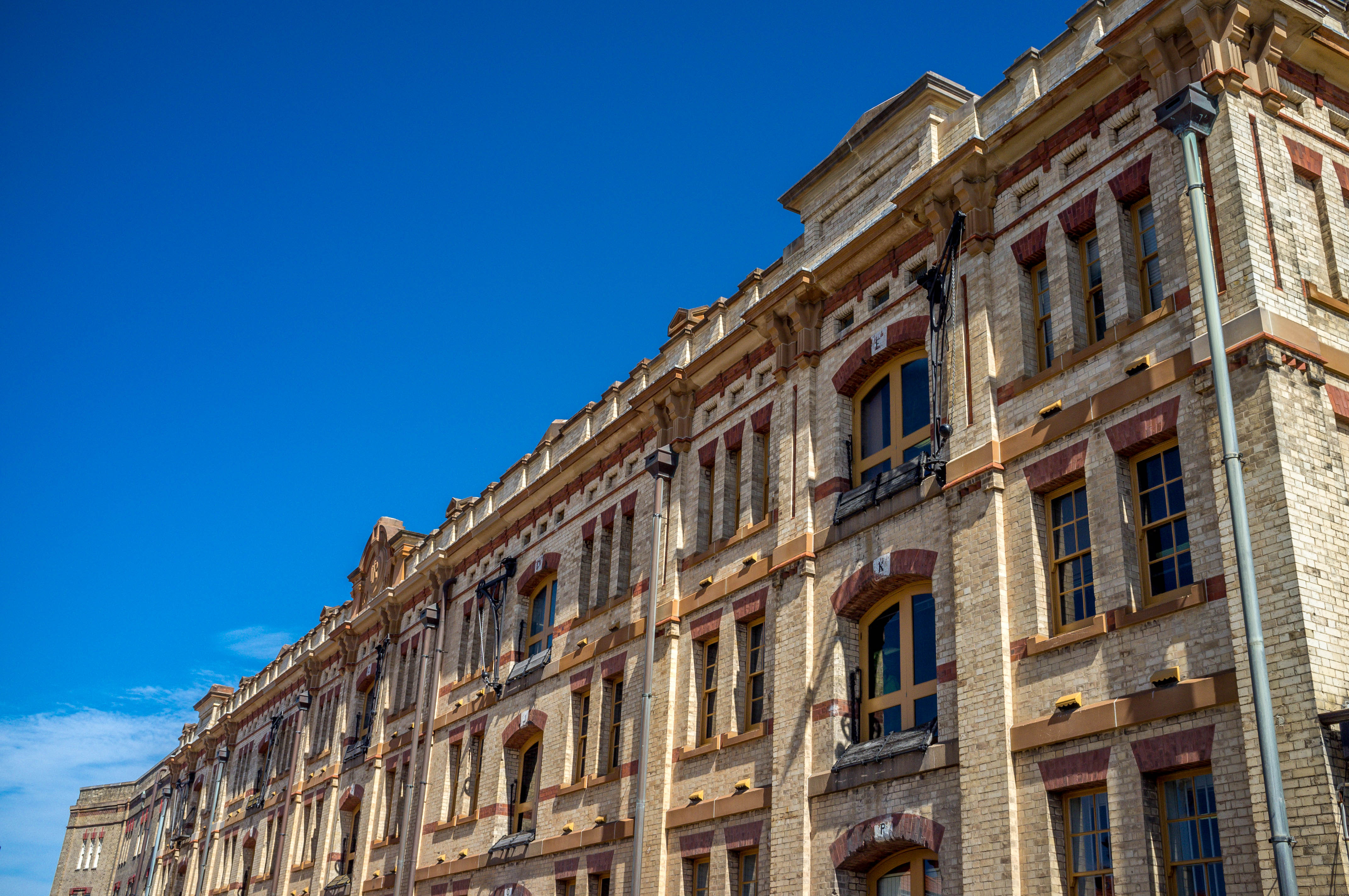
Naval Stores Building of 1893

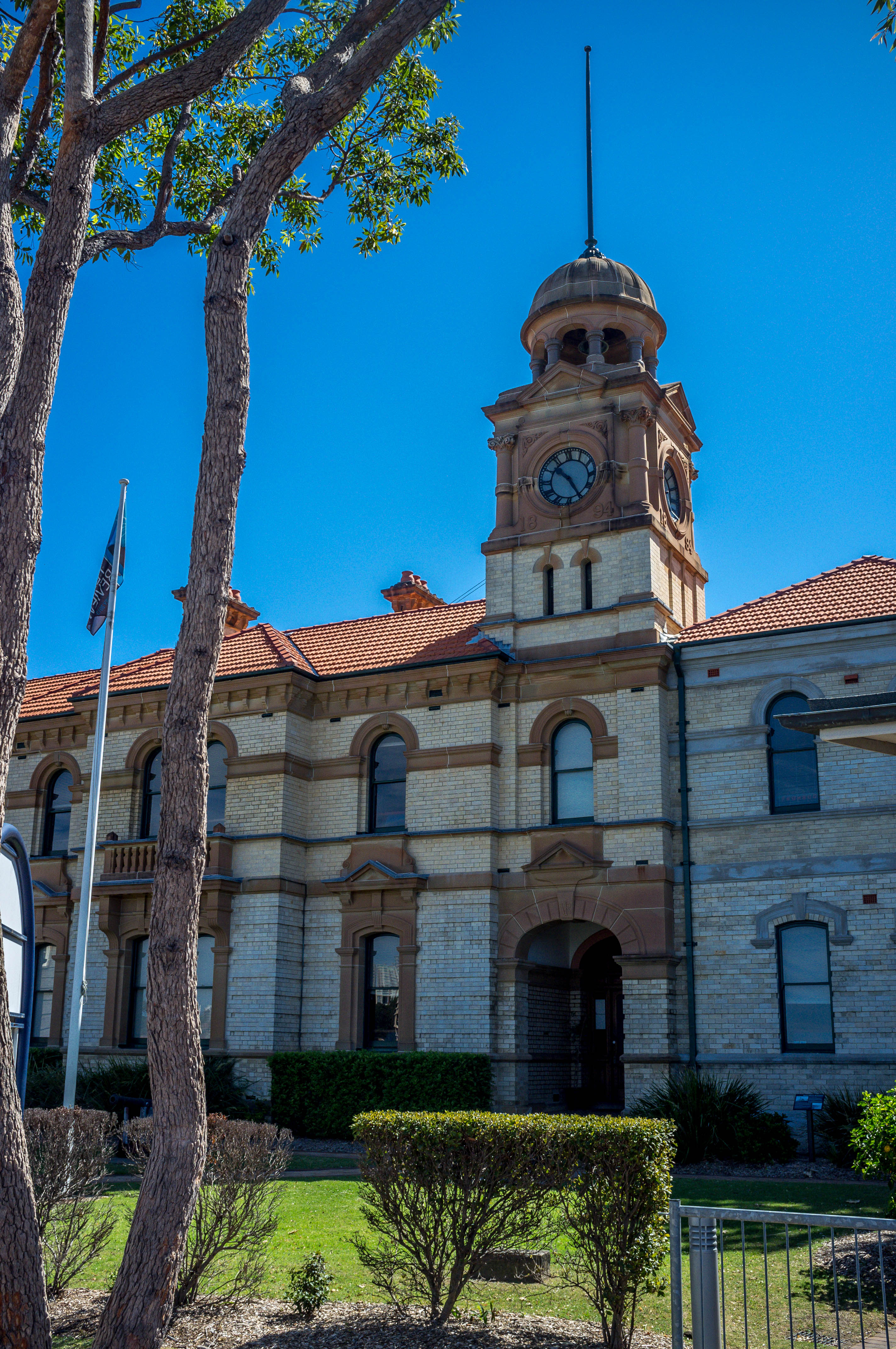
Administration Building of 1894–5

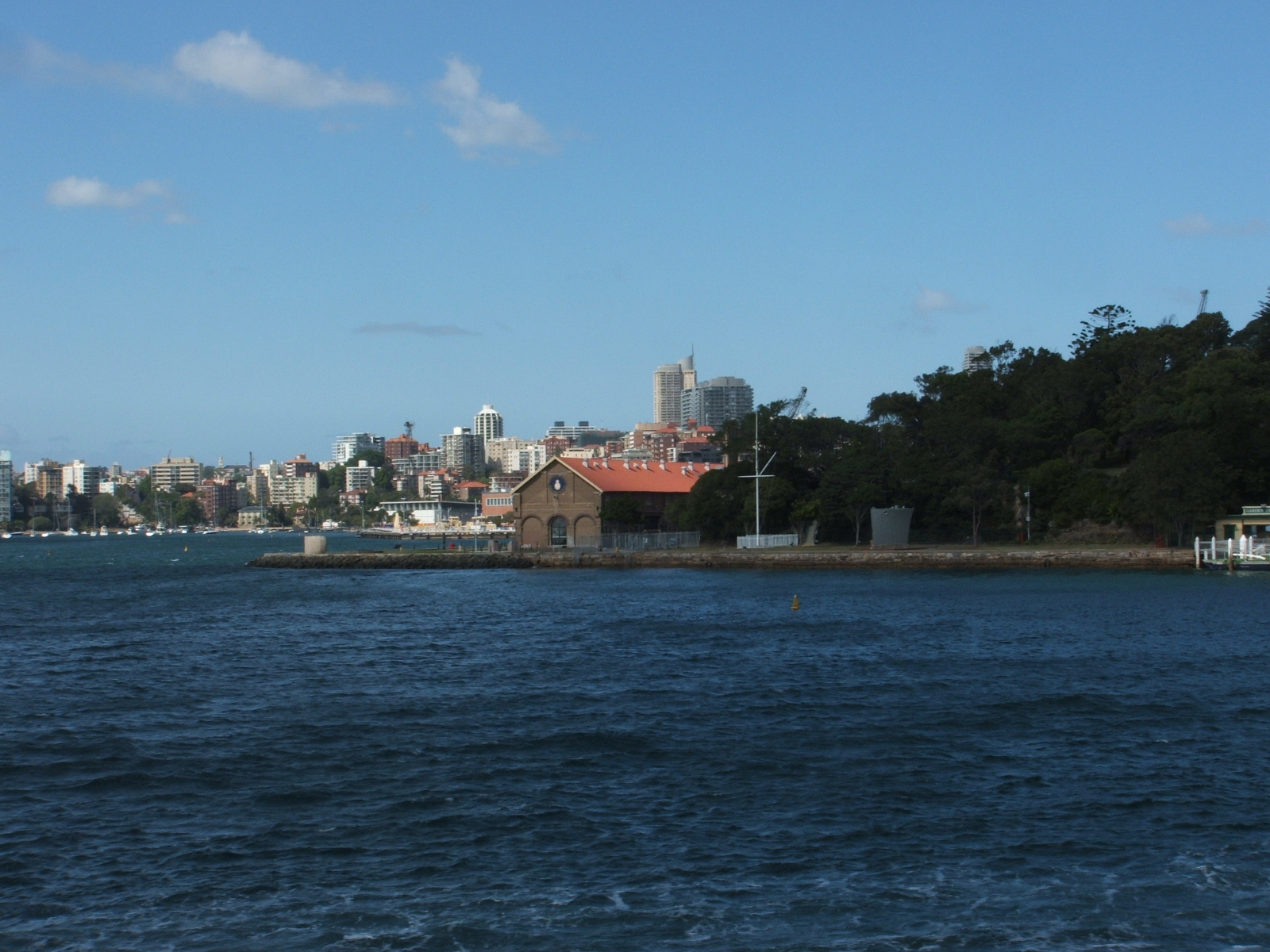
Gun-mounting Workshop of 1922

=== List ===
Heritage Items
Date	Description	Details
1945	Captain Cook Dock	Constructed between 1941–45 and opened 24 March 1945 as the largest Graving Dock in southern hemisphere
1888	Royal Navy/Royal Marine Barracks	Northern & southern balconies added in 1892
1888	Kitchens/Laundry	Meals were prepared in kitchens and taken into Barracks for eating
	Detention Quarters	Cell door bolted to wall behind Barracks. The only relic remaining of Detention Quarters
1942	Tanks/air raid shelter	Underground water tanks for kitchens made into air raid shelters for 100 people
1928	Lubricating Oil Store	Modernised and lift added in 1984 to become Dockyard Supply Centre
1893	Sheerlegs Crane	Constructed by Easton & Anderson, then the largest crane in the world. Design Load 160T and Test loaded to 200T. Removed in 1940
1951	Hammerhead Crane	One of only 15 still standing around the world, the crane has not been used since 1996. Department of Defence has announced removal.
1788	Original Gardens	Gardens were first started on 11 February 1788 for crew of HMS Sirius and used by various ships till 1806. Hence the name Garden Island, given in 1788 in January
1893	Naval Stores	Water hydraulics provides the power for the lifts and hoists
1893–c.1960	Standard gauge rail	Tramway operated around the Island. It was extended to Dock in the 1940s. Steam crane locomotives provided motive power
1889	Chain & Anchor Store/Battery Shop	Submarine batteries maintained. Fire station located at end of Store
1889	Spar Shed/Torpedo Store	Early Church Services in upstairs Dining Room
1889	Sawmill/Factory	Machinery in factory run by belts from a main steam driven shaft
1916–1960s	Cable & Chain Testing Machine	Used to pull cables & chain to test links and ends
1895	Coal Store	Storage for nearly 500 tons of coal, with its timber Coaling Wharf at the front, serviced with rail lines
1913	HMAS Parramatta Bow	Stern is located in a park in Parramatta
1924	Gun workshop and store	Converted to the Royal Australian Navy Heritage Centre in 2005
	Various	Memorials dedicated to ships of the Royal Australian Navy
1893	Tidal Baths	Closed in 1973 due to Harbour water quality and condition of the pool
1886	2nd Boat Shed	Since 2005 the Dockyard Display for the Royal Australian Navy Heritage Centre
1896	3rd Boat Shed	First boatshed built west of island in 1858
1893–95	Administration Building	Originally with single story on each side. Extended in 1920s & 30s.
1942	HMAS Kuttabul Memorial	The site of the sinking of the ferry Kuttabul with a loss of 21 lives
1887–89	Rigging House	First major building constructed. Upper floor was a sail loft, lower floor-boat shed and rigging house. The sail loft was used as a ballroom and function centre in the years after it was completed
1942	Slipways/ Air Raid Shelter	Northern Slipway later used as a steel reinforced air raid shelter. The steel plate was originally for HMAS Sydney, which was lost in battle
1950	Tarakan Disaster Memorial	Landing craft HMAS Tarakan's petrol tanks exploded, claiming 8 lives
1905–1948	Detention Quarters	Navy gaol with 20 cells. Closed in 1943, demolished in 1948
1884–1888	Original End of Island	Reclaimed from Hill spoil. Original end of island close to north end of Rigging House. A rocky shoal extended south where Rigging House is now situated
1902	Coffer Dam	Constructed to surround a basin to drain in order for the Dock to be constructed
1996	Church/Memorial Chapel	Balcony inside had 20 partitions for prisoners from gaol to occupy
1885 & 1895–96	Residences	Constructed for Supervisors on call, continued use till the 1990s
1880	1st Tennis Court	Built around 1880 just south of the residences
1884	2nd Tennis Court	Built around 1884 on the area south of the present fuel tank remained till c.1930
1788	Rock Carvings of Initials FM, WB & IR	3 men surveying Port Jackson landed and carved their initials
1902	1st Signal Station
1910	2nd Signal Station	A 72-metre (236 ft) mast was constructed in 1912. Shortened flag mast now located at the Australian National Maritime Museum
1925	3rd Signal Station
1917	Oil Fuel Tank	5,000-ton oil fuel tank planned in 1913, excavations began in 1915, continuing till 1917 when tank was constructed for the new fuel oil burning ships
