= Royal Australian Navy Heritage Centre =

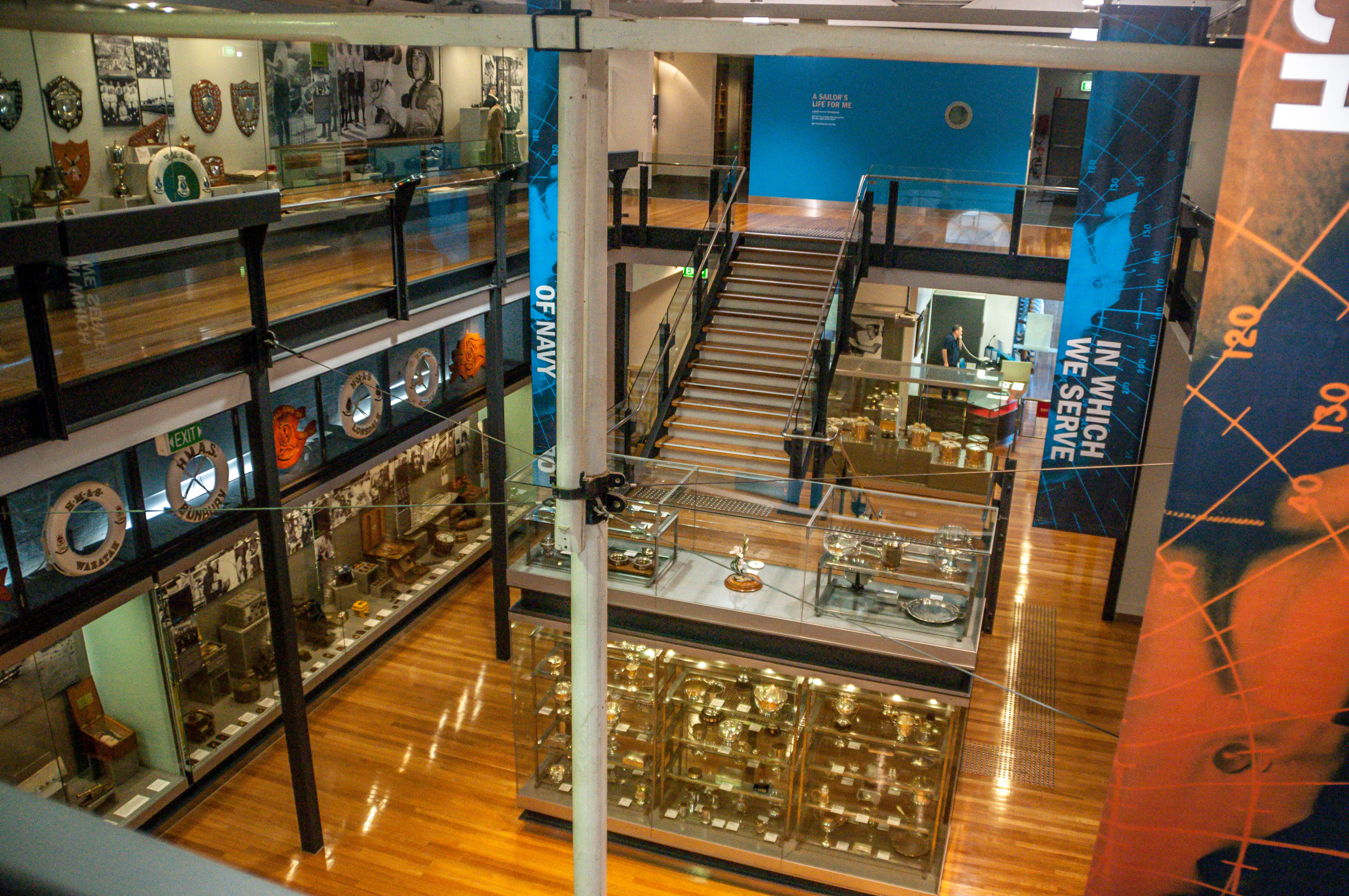
- Established: 2005
- Dissolved: 2021
- Location: Garden Island, Sydney
- Coordinates: 33.8598014°S 151.2291777°E
- Type: Maritime Museum
- Website: Official Site

The Royal Australian Navy Heritage Centre was the maritime museum of the Royal Australian Navy. The centre opened on 4 October 2005 and was located within the then Public Access Area on the northern end of the Garden Island naval base in Sydney. In 2021 it was permanently closed due to access issues within the working naval base.

The need for such a facility was first recognised in 1922, by Vice Admiral Sir William Creswell who suggested the building of a museum to permanently display the Australian Navy's already rich and unique heritage. Since then, there have been several attempts to establish an international-standard naval museum.

The origins of the RANHC date from 2001, when the then Chief of the Navy commissioned a Naval Heritage Management Study to examine in detail how the RAN's past might best be used to support the present Navy's goals. One of the most important recommendations was the creation of a facility for the public display of the Naval Heritage Collection (NHC). Once approval for funding was received, a RANHC Project Board was formed and the project began on 24 May 2004. The NHC contained more than 250,000 individual items, and the mission of the RANHC was to display those objects of museum standard to the public, and through these displays capture something of the Australian naval experience.

== Exhibits ==
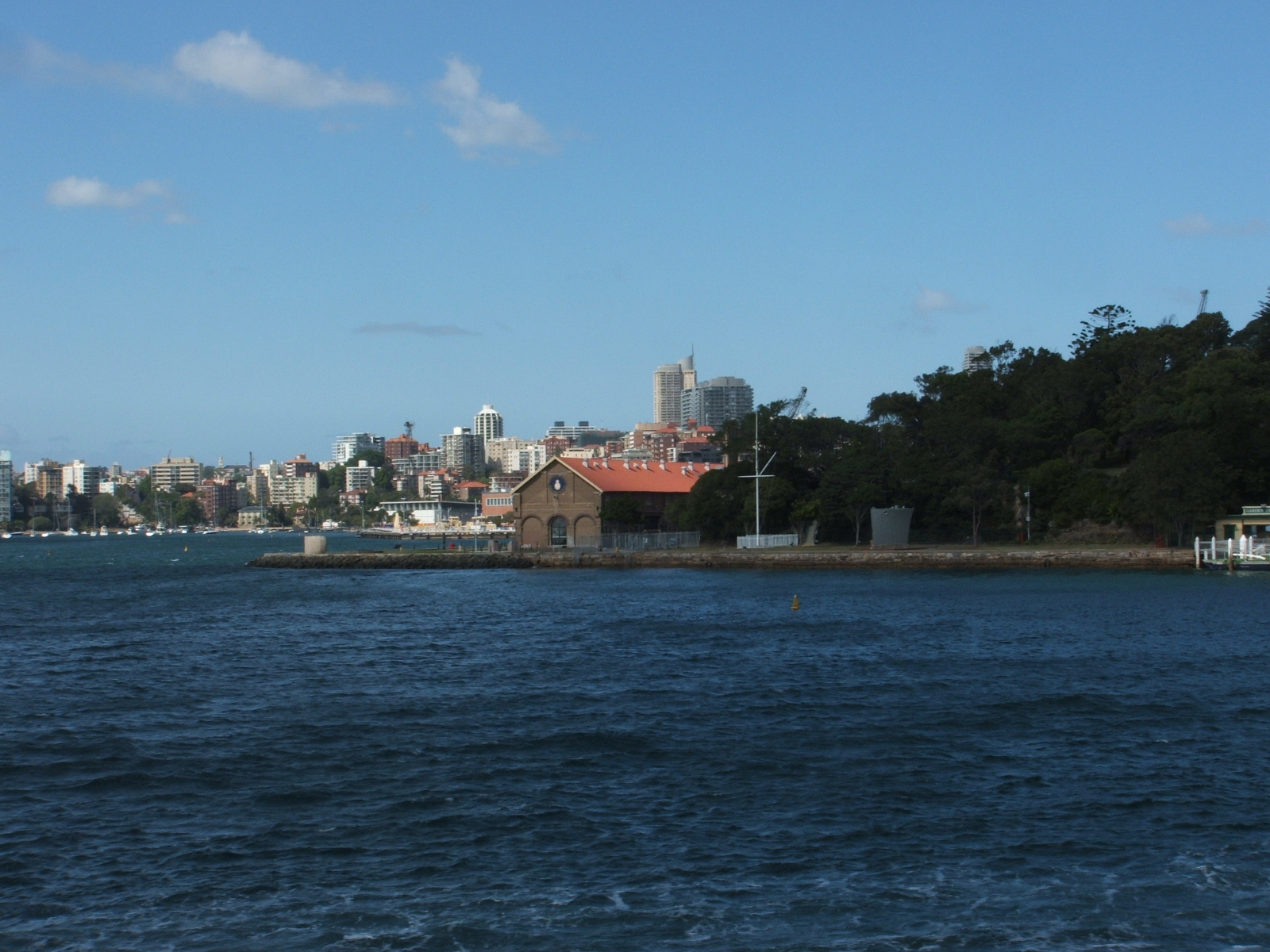
The RAN Heritage Centre building, at the northern end of Garden Island

The Professions of Navy

This was a large thematic display focusing on how the Navy's people have 'done the job' at sea over the years. Branches and categories past and present were used to explain how the naval profession has changed and developed.

The Periscope

This exhibit featured a unique interactive display: a fully operational submarine attack periscope was installed to allow visitors an unusual view of Sydney Harbour.

Naval Technology and Ordnance

A specific display illustrating how the Navy has developed and applied technology to the sea-fighting environment. It included precision instruments for navigation and gunnery, in addition to examples of naval ordnance ranging from shells and torpedoes to modern guided missiles.

The Battle of Sydney

This centred on the fin and control centre from one of the Japanese midget submarines that attacked Sydney Harbour on the night of 31 May-1 June 1942, and also included the Boom Boat belonging to the Maritime Services Board that first raised the alarm. The display was supported by an interactive audiovisual presentation.

In Which We Serve

This was a large chronological display of items that tell the stories of famous Australian ships and their battles. Artefacts were included from the colonial era, the First and Second World Wars, the Cold War and operations in the Persian Gulf.

Boats and Dockyards

The 1913 Boatshed was dedicated as the display gallery for artefacts related to small boats and Australian dockyards, particularly Garden Island.

A Sailors Life For Me

This main exhibition display used the entire mezzanine level of the workshop building, and provided visitors with an introduction to a sailor's life at sea. The display included a mock-up of a World War II-era mess deck, as well as artefacts highlighting naval traditions and pastimes.

The Bridge

This was a mock-up of a Battle-class destroyer's open bridge, and was one of the major interactive displays in the centre. Using original equipment from 50 years ago, the Bridge was aimed at helping visitors acquire some experience of what takes place on a warship's bridge at sea.

== Gallery ==
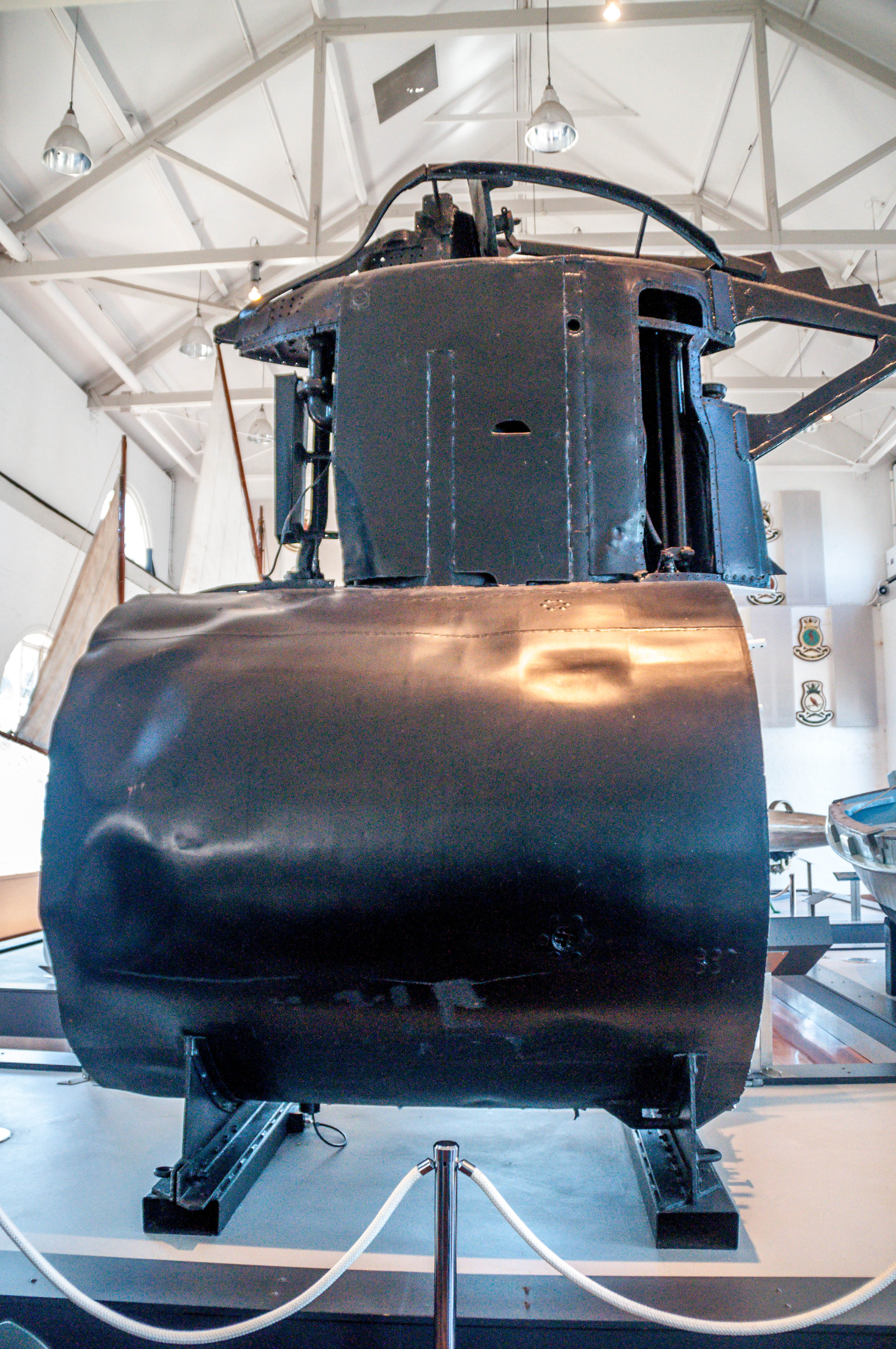
Submarine Conning Tower M 22 'Battle of Sydney'

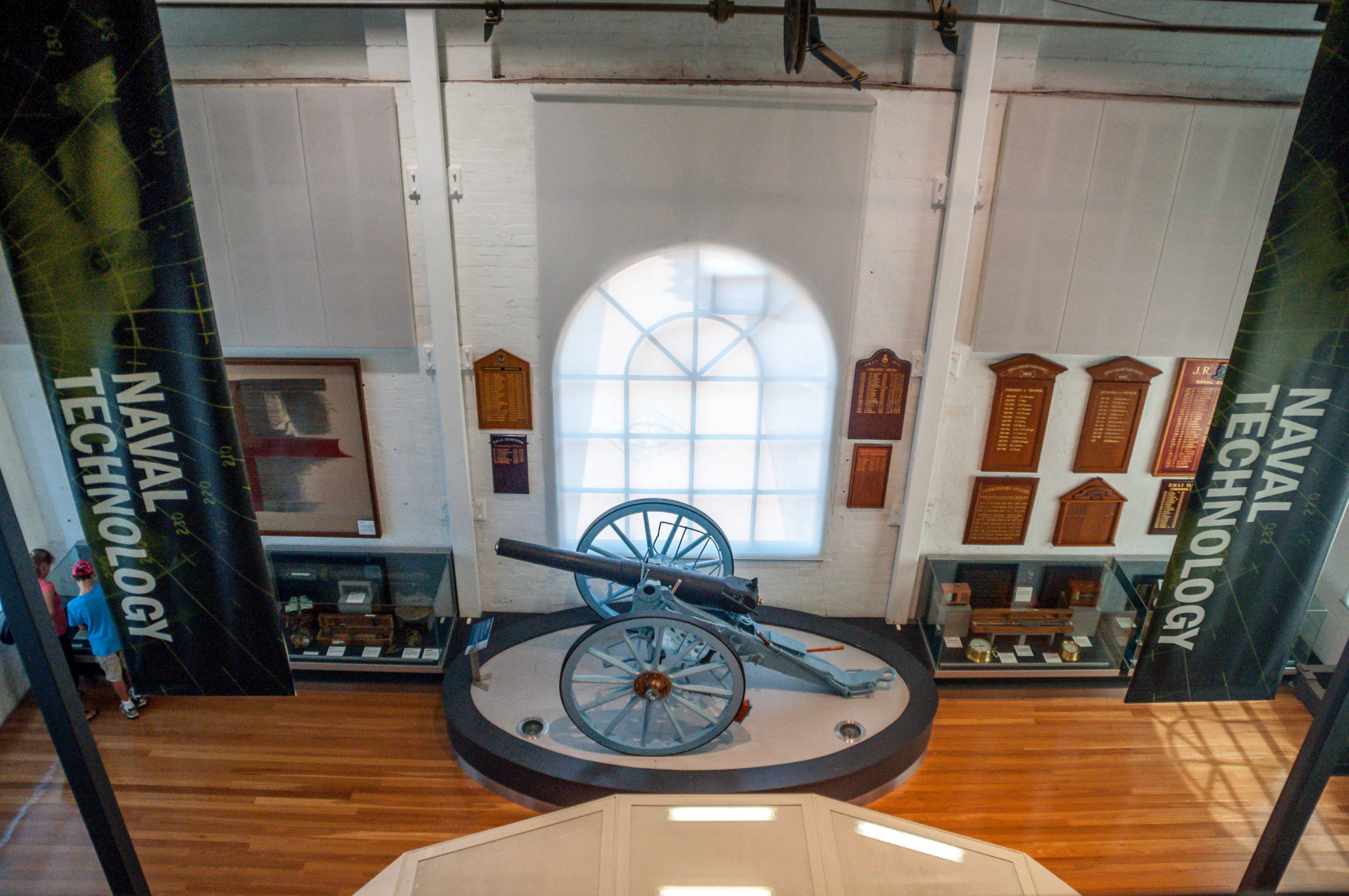
Naval Technology

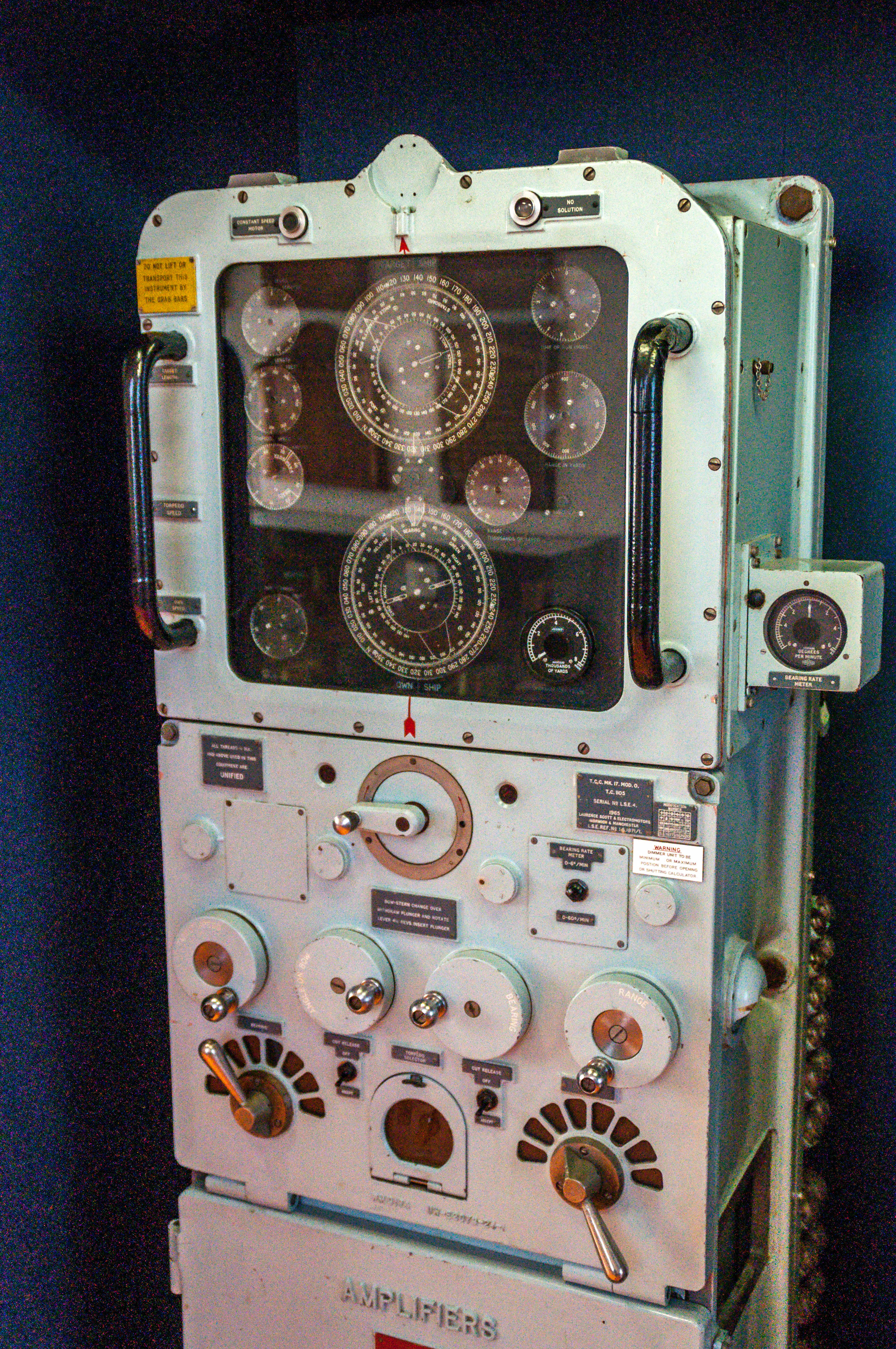
Torpedo Control Console Mk 17 Mod 6 - RAN Oberon Class Submarine

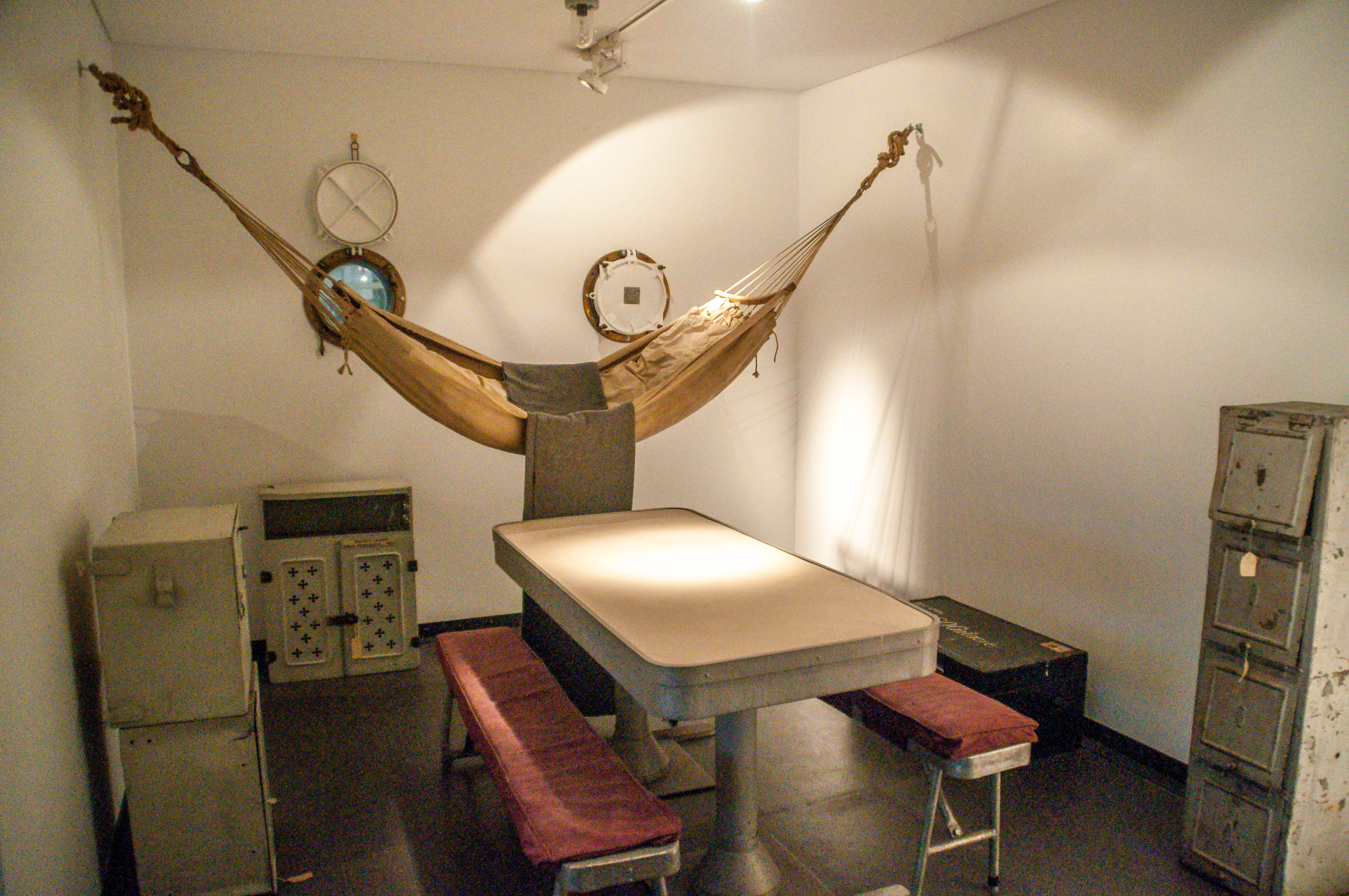
World War II-era mess deck

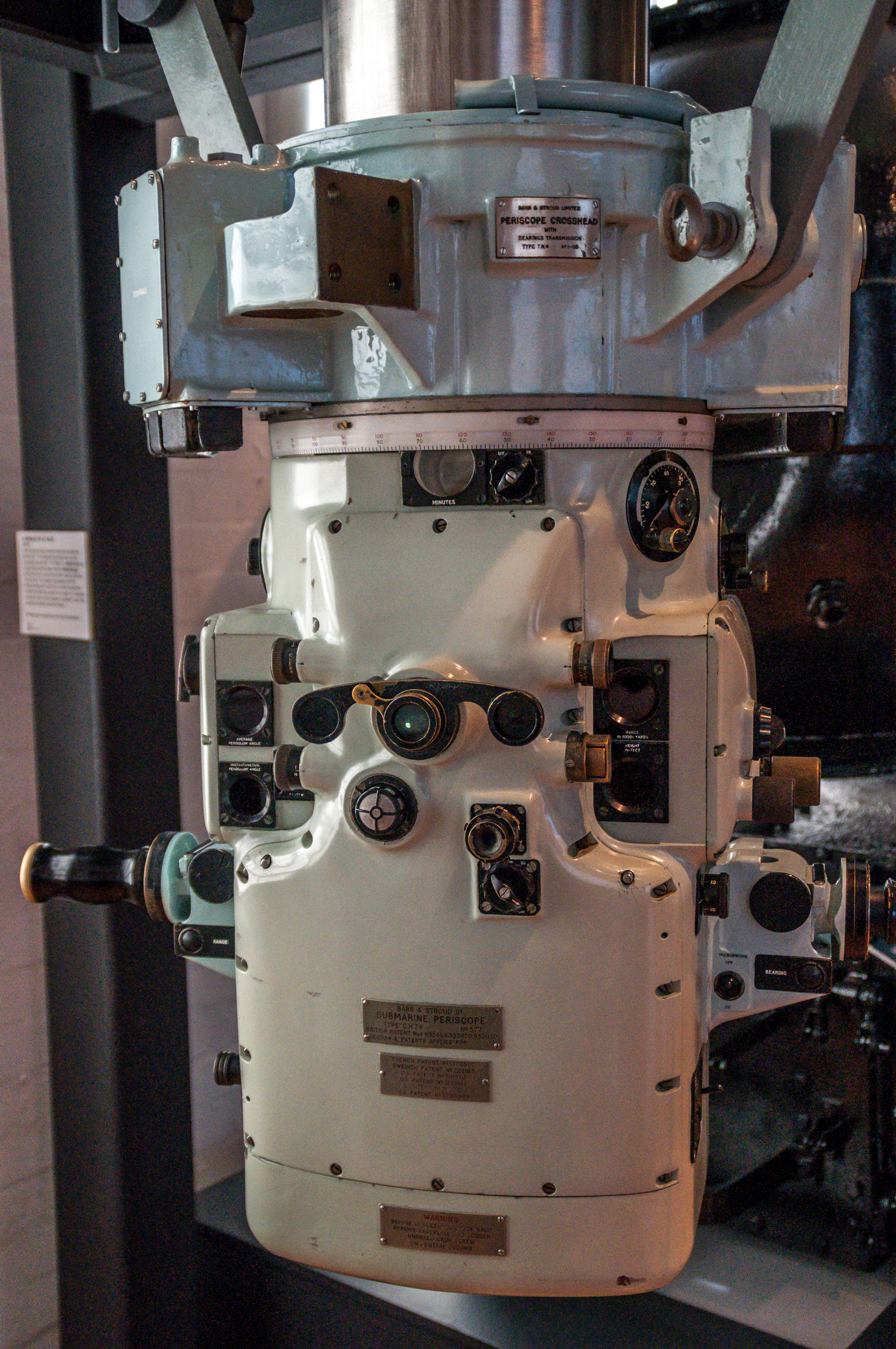
Attack Periscope Type CH74 - RAN Oberon Class Submarine 1957-99

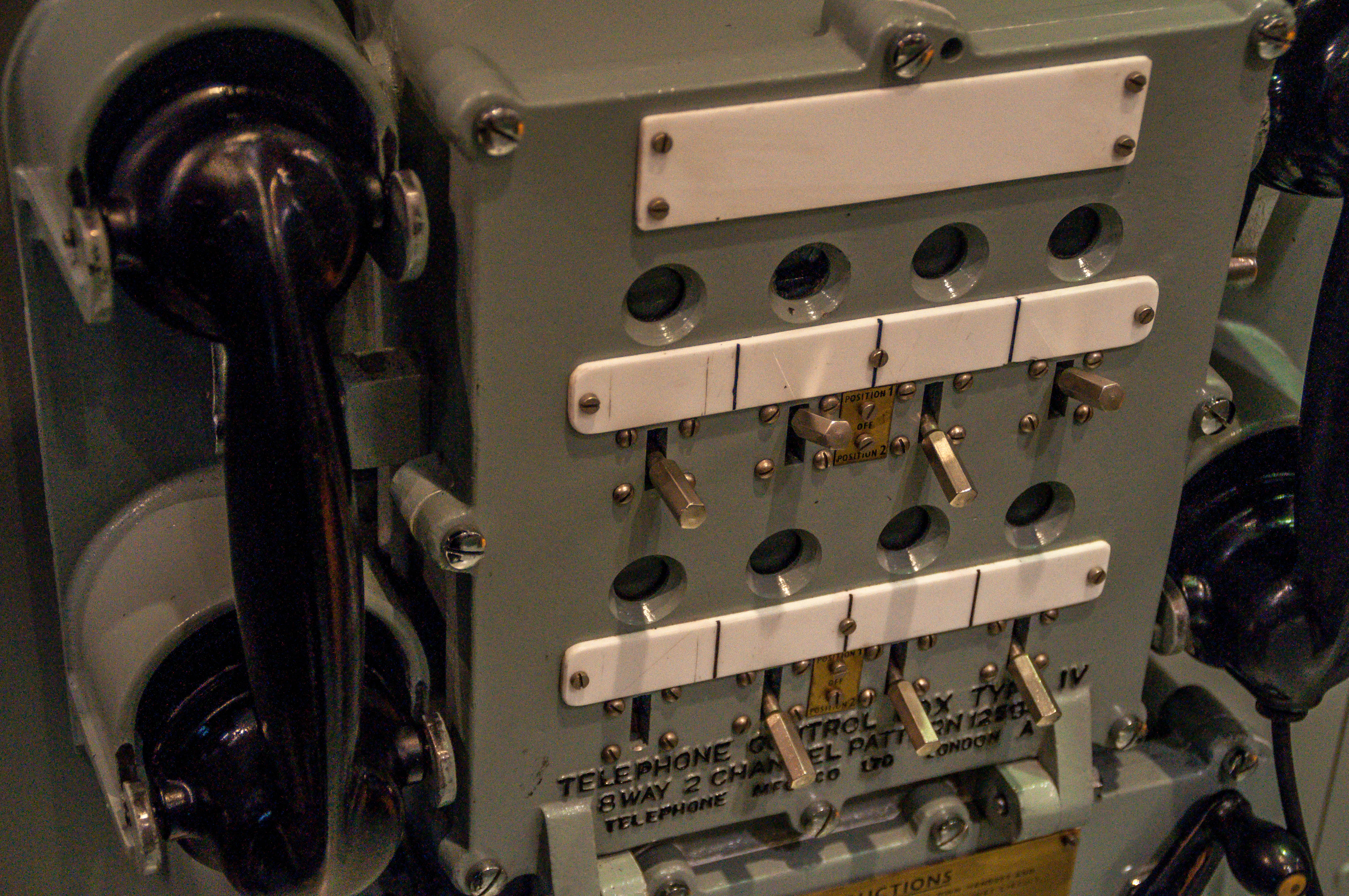
Bridge Telephone

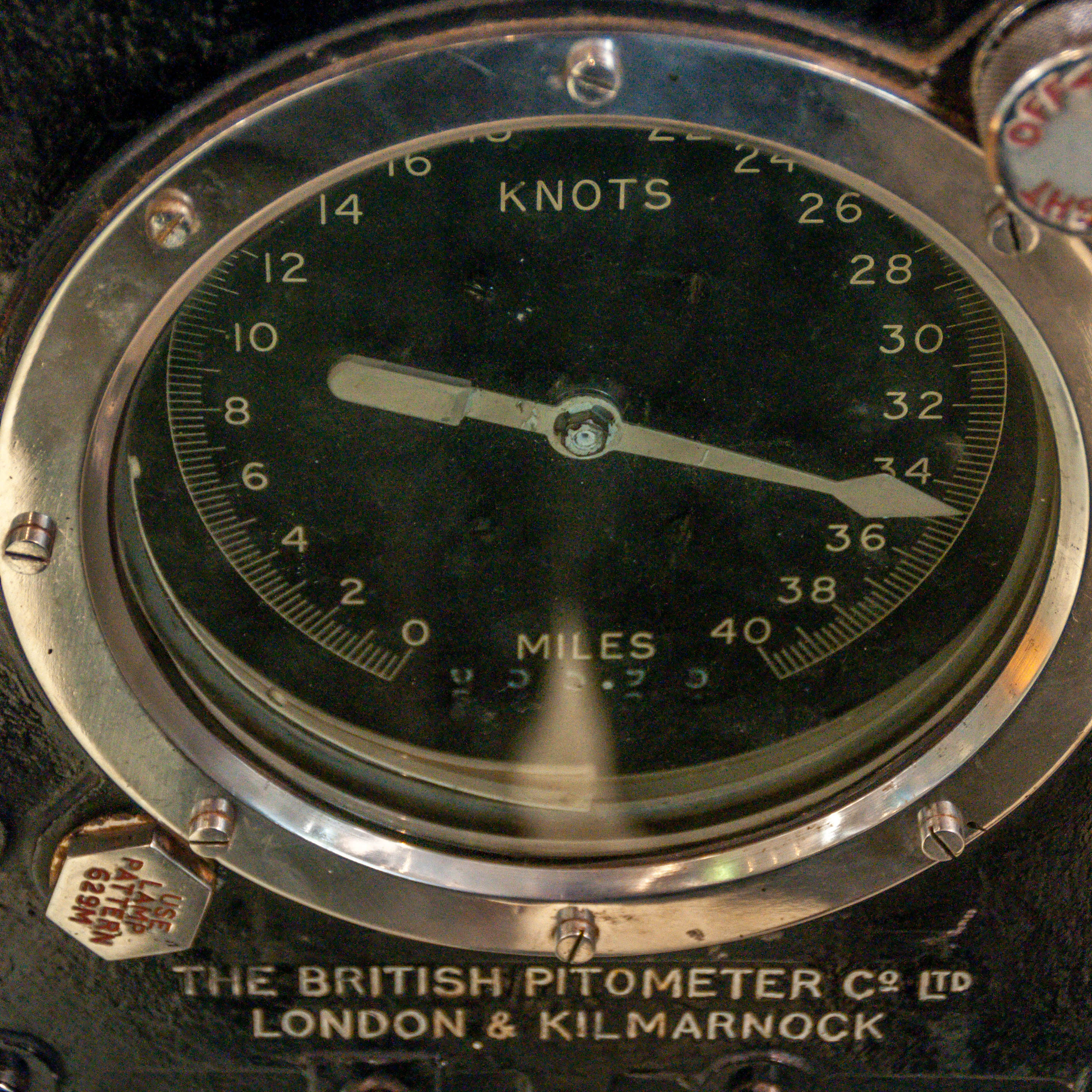
Speed Indicator

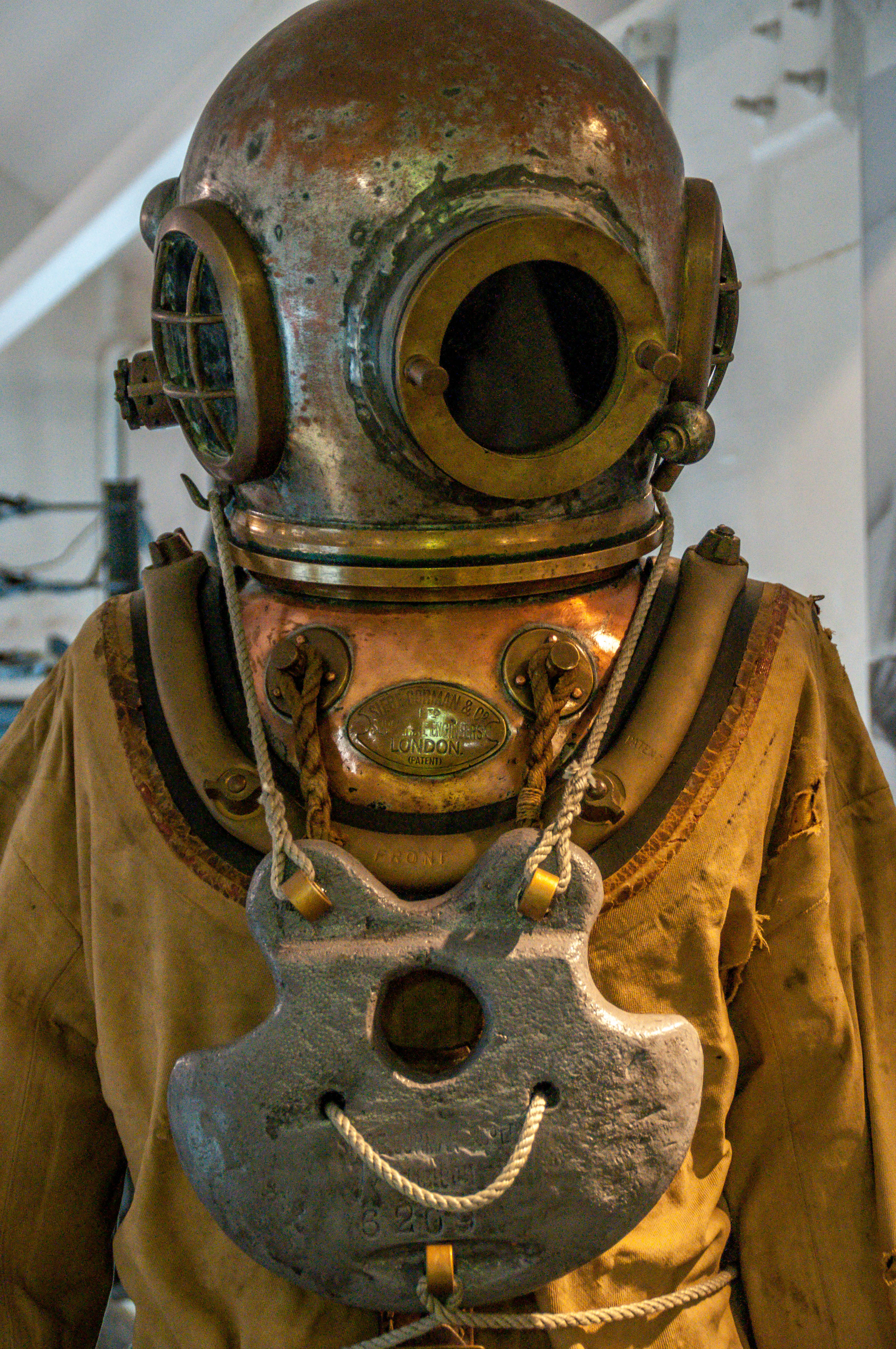
Diving Display

== See also ==
- Fleet Air Arm Museum (Australia), a museum at HMAS Albatross focusing on the history of the RAN Fleet Air Arm
