= STS Young Endeavour II =

Tall ship operated and maintained by the Royal Australian Navy

History

Australia
- Name: Young Endeavour II
- Namesake: HM Bark Endeavour
- Builder: Birdon Group
- Laid down: 25 July 2023
- Status: Under construction

General characteristics
- Type: Sail training ship
- Sail plan: 14 sails, Barquentine rig
- Complement: 15 standard, plus 42 youth crew

STS Young Endeavour II is an Australian tall ship. Built by Birdon Group, the ship will be operated and maintained by the Royal Australian Navy.

== Design and construction ==
Young Endeavour II is being built by the Birdon Group in Port Macquarie. The vessel was designed by Dykstra Naval Architects as a barquentine rig, utilising square-rigged sails on the foremast and fore-and-aft sails rigged on the fore, main and mizzen masts.
