= Karuah River Bridge =

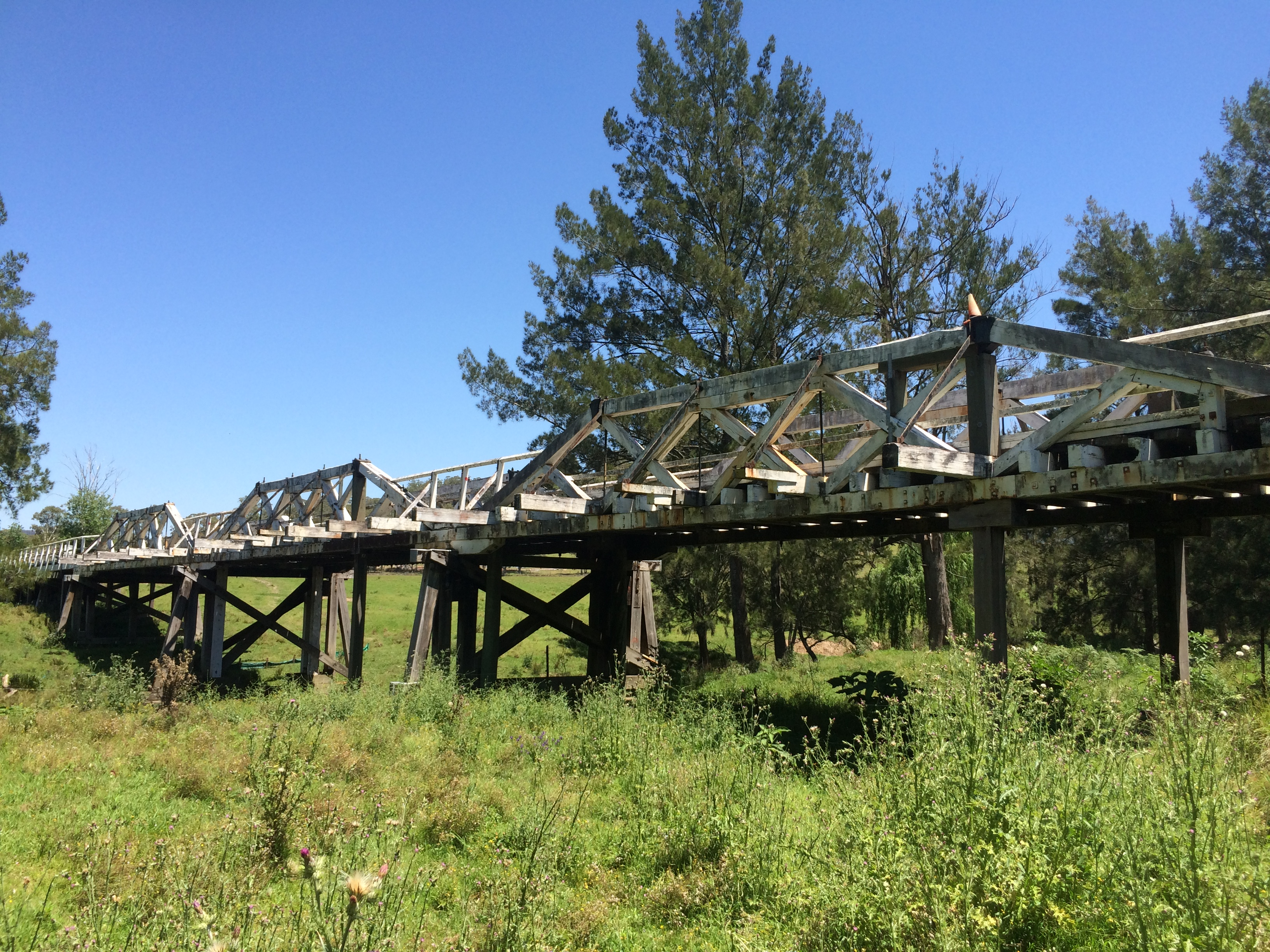
- Monkerai Bridge, in 2014
- Coordinates: 32°17′01″S 151°52′38″E
- Carries: Weismantels-Dingadee Road
- Crosses: Karuah River
- Locale: Monkerai, New South Wales, Australia
- Other name(s): Monkerai Bridge
- Owner: Transport for NSW

Characteristics
- Design: Truss bridge
- Material: Timber
- Pier construction: Timber and concrete
- Total length: 98.4 metres (323 ft)
- Width: 4.9 metres (16 ft)
- No. of spans: 6

History
- Engineering design by: NSW Public Works Department
- Construction end: 1882

New South Wales Heritage Register
- Official name: Monkerai Bridge over Karuah River; Karuah River bridge, Monkerai
- Type: State heritage (built)
- Designated: 20 June 2000
- Reference no.: 1475
- Type: Road Bridge
- Category: Transport - Land

The Karuah River bridge is a heritage-listed road bridge that carries the Weismantels-Dingadee Road across the Karuah River, located at Monkerai, New South Wales, Australia. The bridge is also known as the Monkerai Bridge over Karuah River. The bridge is owned by Transport for NSW. It was added to the New South Wales State Heritage Register on 20 June 2000.

== History ==
The bridge was completed in 1882.

In 2017, funding was provided for a Conservation Management Plan to restore the bridge and determine its future use.

== Description ==
The bridge carries the Weismantels-Dingadee Road over the Karuah River between Dungog and Stroud. It comprises six spans (three approach spans and three truss spans) with an overall length of 98.4 metres (323 ft) and a maximum road width of 4.9 metres (16 ft) between kerbs. The majority of the bridge is timber, with metal used for shoes, vertical tension rods, and bolts.

In recent years, pier two was rebuilt with a concrete base, longitudinal decking was installed and timber endposts were attached to the railing at either end of the bridge.

While little original fabric remains on the bridge, it is still considered to have a high degree of integrity, the reason being that timber truss bridges were designed with the requirement to replace timber elements in mind. The fact that timber elements on this Bridge have generally been replaced "like for like" means that this structure has a high degree of integrity. Its level of integrity is greater than that of the only other old NSW Public Works Department (PWD) truss bridge still in existence, the Clarence Town Bridge over Williams River, as it has had less structural modifications made to it.

== Heritage listing ==
The Monkerai Bridge is one of the most significant bridges in the NSW road network from a heritage perspective. It has been assessed previously as being of heritage significance at a national level, although it is endorsed and managed by the Roads & Traffic Authority (RTA) as being significant at a State level. While the bridge is of aesthetic and social significance, its high level of heritage significance stems chiefly from it being of great historical and technical significance. The Bridge is the second oldest surviving timber truss bridge in the NSW road network, and is an exceptionally rare example of an Old PWD truss bridge. Old PWD truss bridges were the first in the five-stage development of timber truss bridges in NSW, and represent the genesis of this form of bridge construction. While the bridge as a whole has been assessed as fulfilling the criteria for listing on the SHR, the various elements that comprise the Bridge are of varying levels of significance: abutments, piers, decking and hand railing are of moderate significance, of works the cross girders are of considerable significance and the truss spans are of exceptional significance.

Monkerai Bridge over Karuah River was listed on the New South Wales State Heritage Register on 20 June 2000 having satisfied the following criteria.

The place is important in demonstrating the course, or pattern, of cultural or natural history in New South Wales.

The bridge is the second-oldest surviving timber truss road bridge in New South Wales, and is one of only two surviving Old PWD truss bridges in existence. The design of the Bridge is historically significant through its links to earlier European timber truss bridges, the designs of which can be traced back to the influence of the 16th Century Italian architect, Andrea Palladio. The Bridge is historically significant through its association with the expansion of the NSW road network, and the contribution of that road system to the settlement and development of NSW. The form and fabric of the Bridge are significant in reflecting the requirement of an 1861 parliamentary decree that local materials be used in the construction of public works, to reduce the costs associated with the importation of iron, which was not produced locally at that time.

The place has a strong or special association with a person, or group of persons, of importance of cultural or natural history of New South Wales's history.

The bridge is significant through its association with William Bennett, the Commissioner for Public Works, designer of the Old PWD truss, and "father" of timber truss bridges in NSW.

The place is important in demonstrating aesthetic characteristics and/or a high degree of creative or technical achievement in New South Wales.

The form of the bridge is aesthetically pleasing. The structural detail of the bridge is clearly visible, and the form of the truss has an angularity and repetition of form that is pleasing to the eye. The bridge is located in a visually attractive landscape of gently rolling hills and valleys, and the Bridge itself forms an attractive addition to the built component of that landscape. The appearance of the bridge when viewed from up or downstream is quite striking.

The place has strong or special association with a particular community or cultural group in New South Wales for social, cultural or spiritual reasons.

The bridge is of significance to the people of the Monkerai area, both as a transport link, and as a local heritage item although there does not appear to be a high level of community awareness of its heritage significance. The bridge is of significance to the region for its place in the road network of the Hunter Region, and through its historical contribution to the settlement and development of the Gloucester region. Timber truss bridges are significant to the social identity of NSW as the "timber truss bridge state", being the only Australian state to widely use timber truss bridges as an integral part of its late 19th and early 20th Century road network.

The place has potential to yield information that will contribute to an understanding of the cultural or natural history of New South Wales.

The bridge is of high technical significance as a rare remaining example of an Old PWD truss bridge, the first truss type designed and used for timber road bridges in NSW. Through study of the Old PWD and later truss types, it is possible to track the design changes made to the various truss types as designs were refined for better durability and ease of maintenance.

The place possesses uncommon, rare or endangered aspects of the cultural or natural history of New South Wales.

The bridge is an exceptionally rare example of a once prolific form of bridge construction. Only two Old PWD truss bridges survive, out of a total of 147 constructed.

The place is important in demonstrating the principal characteristics of a class of cultural or natural places/environments in New South Wales.

The bridge is highly representative of an Old PWD truss, and demonstrates the construction and design techniques used in the earliest form of timber truss bridge design in NSW. The bridge is intact and still functioning in its original role as a road bridge. Whilst elements of the Bridge have been altered to meet current traffic requirements, safety specifications or to make the structure less difficult to maintain, the most significant elements of the bridge, the truss spans, still retain the characteristics of the original design.

== See also ==
- Historic bridges of New South Wales
- List of bridges in Australia
