= Richard Brooks (captain) =

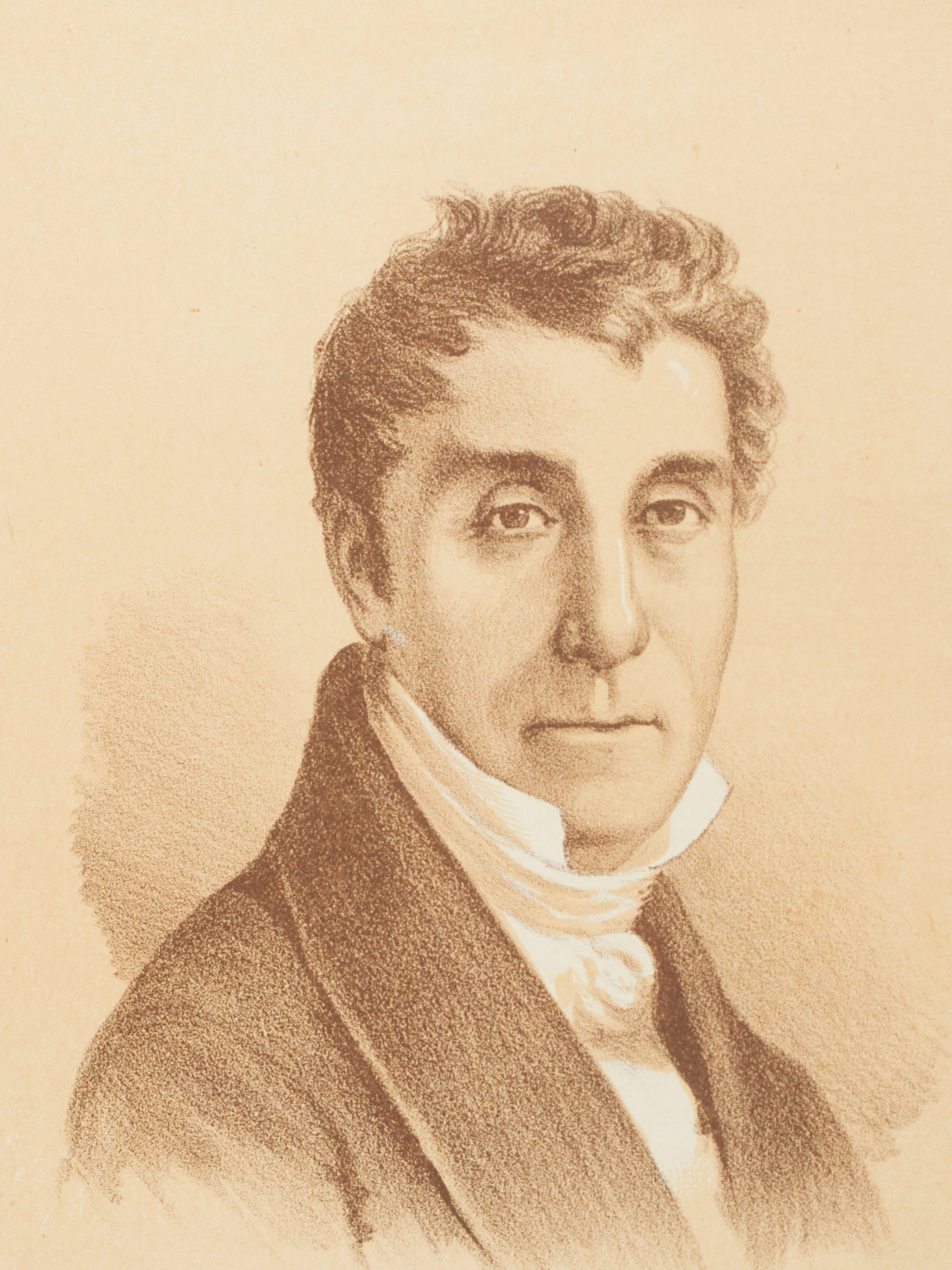
Captain Richard Brooks

Richard Brooks (c. 1765—1833), pioneer New South Wales settler, was born in Devon, England, the son of Henry Brooks, a clergyman of Salcombe Regis and Honoria Hall (daughter of Joseph Hall the vicar of Salcombe Regis and his wife Honoria Burchinshaw).

== Pedigree ==
Often described simply as the son of an "impoverished clergyman", Richard Brooks had notable maternal ancestry, his mother having descended from the Burchinshaws of Llansannan, Wales and possibly Joseph Hall, English bishop and satirist.

== Ship's Captain ==
Richard Brooks is said to have had little formal education before entering the British East India Company's service at an early age, rising to command his own ship. During the first French Revolutionary War he traded to Porto, Portugal the Mediterranean and the Baltic, carrying a letter of marque, but later returned to the East India service.

He began his association with New South Wales in 1802 when he captained the convict transport Atlas.

Atlas's 222-day voyage was one of the worst in the history of transportation to Australia. During the voyage 64 people died; another four dying shortly after disembarkation. The remainder were "in a dreadfully emaciated and dying state" (Governor King). Governor King asked a committee of enquiry whether Captain Brooks' private trade goods which took up space in the hospital and prison and the unnecessary stops en route to Australia contributed to the deaths. The committee stated that mortality had been caused by "the want of proper attention to cleanliness, the want of free circulation of air, and the lumbered state of the prison and hospital".

In 1806 he was captain of another transport, the Alexander, on which no deaths ensued; thereafter he made a number of trading trips to the colony, in the Rose in 1808, the Simon Cock in 1810, and the Argo in 1811, and built up large interests in the colony. In 1812 he fathered an illegitimate child with Ann Jamieson in Sydney. In February 1813 Brooks was on his way to England in the Isabella when she was wrecked near the Falkland Islands, and he sailed to Buenos Aires in a long-boat for help. In July he asked for permission to go to New South Wales as a free settler. Allowed to go, he arrived in March 1814 with his wife Christiana, née Passmore (1776–1835), daughter of another East India captain, and children in the Spring.

== Settlement in New South Wales ==
Richard lived at Denham Court in New South Wales, a prominent settler, a member of the New South Wales Agricultural Society, a vice-president of the Benevolent Society, member of the committee of the Bible Society, and a strong supporter of religious charities of all denominations. He owned properties in Sydney at Cockle Bay and Surry Hills and had extensive holdings in the Illawarra, Williams River and Lake George districts. In 1816 he was censured for profiteering during a drought in the colony by withholding cattle from sale.

Brooks was described by his daughter, Christiana Blomfield, in a letter dated 20 January 1828 as ... a nice looking old gentleman of 65, hale and very active for his age. He was 6 ft high when a young man, and I dare say very handsome, but he now loses some of his height by stooping. He is a very affectionate father and I believe particularly fond of me.

In a letter dated 15 March 1831, Christiana wrote that her father had been “very ill from the effects of an accident occasioned by a wild cow running at him while on horseback and goring him in the calf of the leg, while returning from one of his journeys to his cattle stations in the interior. The confinement from such an accident has injured his health and he is weak and rather inclined to be hippish”.

Richard Brooks died on 16 October 1833. He was buried in a vault at Denham Court. The Church of St Mary the Virgin was later built to enclose the remains of Richard and his wife, Christiana, who died on 12 April 1835.

== Public service ==
1817 - appointed to be a Justice of the Peace and Magistrate in the Territory of New South Wales and Member of the Supreme Court

== Family of Richard and Christiana Brooks ==
1. Henry BROOKS (1798–1841) married in 1825 to Margaret Mackenzie, daughter of Alexander McKenzie
2. Christiana Jane BROOKS (1802–1852) married Thomas Valentine Blomfield
3. Mary Honoria BROOKS (1804–1868) married Captain William Wilson in 1828; widowed 1835; married Captain George Wardell in 1838
4. Jane Maria BROOKS (1806–1888) married in 1827 to Edward Cox, Pastoralist and Member of New South Wales Legislative Assembly
5. Honoria Rose BROOKS (c1809 - 1839) married in 1833 to William Edward Riley (1807–1836), pastoralist and sketcher, son of the pioneer pastoralist Alexander Riley
6. Charlotte Sophia BROOKS (c1811 - 1885) married in 1837 to Nathaniel Powell (1812–1874)
7. Richard BROOKS (1814–1855) illegitimate son?, born Sydney, married Augusta Sydney Weston (1837)
8. Maria BROOKS (1814–1892) married in 1836 to Lieutenant Henry Zouch (1811–1883)

== See also ==
- Convictism in Australia
- Convict ship
