= Subsonic Music Festival =

- Genre: Electronic music, techno, hip hop, Dub, Progressive etc
- Dates: December
- Locations: Monkerai, Australia
- Years active: 2009-present
- Founders: Scott Commens
- Attendance: 5000
- Capacity: 5000
- Website: www.subsonicmusic.com.au

Subsonic Music Festival is an annual electronic music festival held since December 2009 in a camping setting in Monkerai, Australia. It was established by Scott Commens (Sydney-based DJ), founder of Sydney based label and events organisation, Subsonic Music.

TimeOut Sydney's Erin Moy said genres in 2012 included "beats. From thumping four to the floor and tummy-rumbling bass," including dub, techno and hip hop. Pulse Radio in Australia gave the 2012 event a positive review. Among the artists that have performed are DJ Kentaro James Holden, Factory Floor, and Mike Huckaby.

In 2014 it took place at Riverwood Downs Mountain Valley Resort. Resident Advisor editors described that year's festival: "Subsonic has gradually embraced house, techno and other forms of dance music alongside its original staples: psytrance and dub." Resident Advisor also listed Subsonic on its Top 10 November / December 2014 Festivals, from around the world.

== See also ==
- List of electronic music festivals
