= Karuah River =

River in New South Wales, Australia

Coordinates: 32°39′S 151°58′E

Karuah River Karuah River Left Hand Branch, Clyde
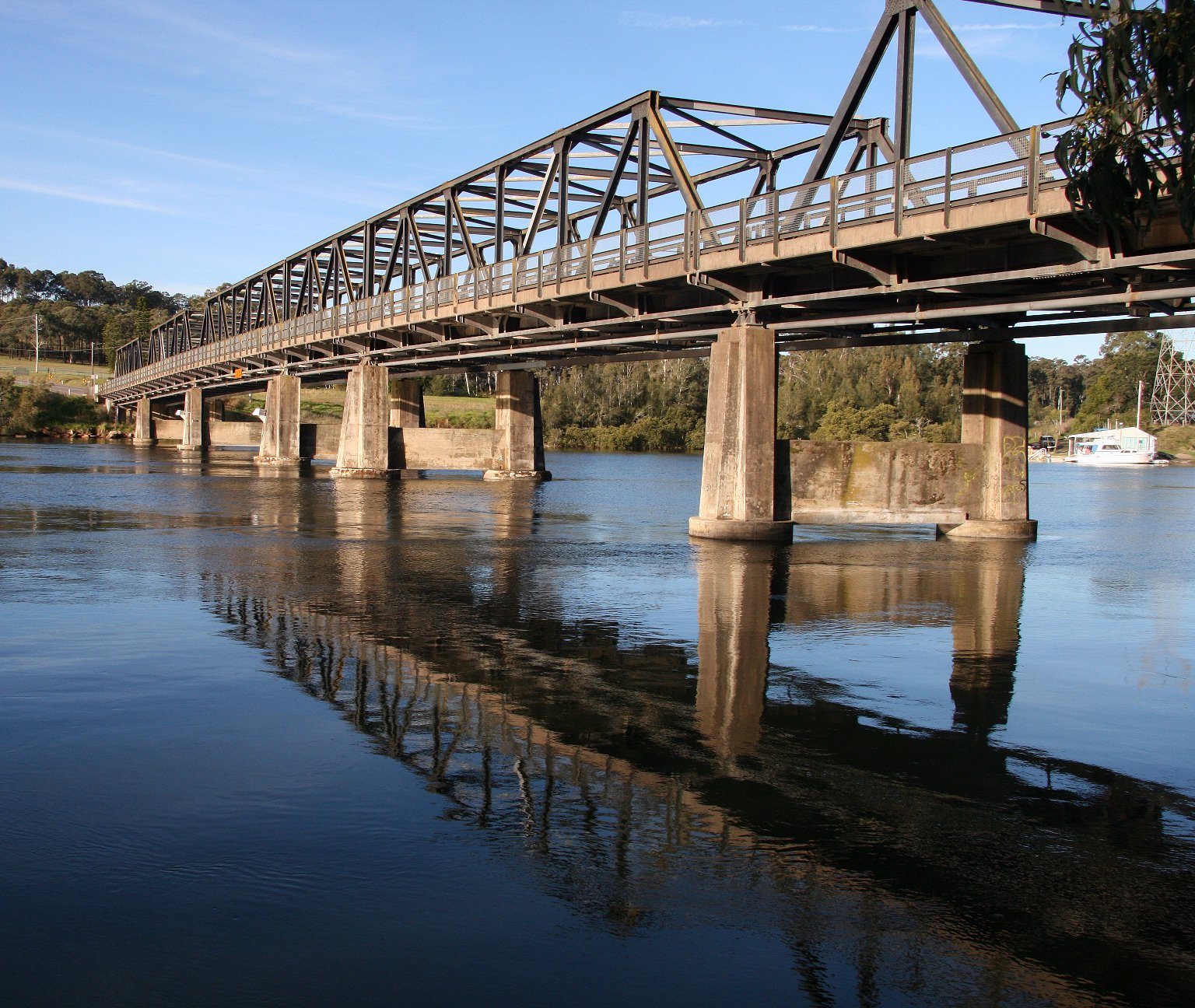
- Karuah Bridge over the Karuah River at Karuah.
- Etymology: Aboriginal

Location
- Country: Australia
- State: New South Wales
- Region: NSW North Coast (IBRA), Mid North Coast, Hunter
- Local government area: Mid-Coast Council
- Town: Stroud, Karuah

Physical characteristics
- Source: Gloucester Tops, Great Dividing Range
  - location: below The Mountaineer, southwest of Gloucester
  - elevation: 598 m (1,962 ft)
- Mouth: Port Stephens
  - location: Karuah
  - elevation: 0 m (0 ft)
- Length: 101 km (63 mi)

Basin features
- Tributaries
  - left: Martins Creek (New South Wales), Lawlers Creek, Mammy Johnsons River, Mill Creek (New South Wales), Alderley Creek, Booral Creek, Snapes Creek, The Branch River
  - right: Whispering Gully, Telegherry River, Scotters Creek, Deep Creek (New South Wales), Limeburners Creek

Karuah River, an open semi-mature tide dominated drowned valley estuary is located in the Mid North Coast and Hunter regions of New South Wales, Australia.

== Course and features ==
Karuah River rises on the southeastern slopes of Gloucester Tops of the Great Dividing Range, below The Mountaineer, southwest of Gloucester, and flows generally southeast and south. joined by eleven tributaries including the Telegherry, Mammy Johnsons, and The Branch rivers, before reaching its mouth within Port Stephens at Karuah, and then flows out to the Tasman Sea of the South Pacific Ocean. The river descends 600 metres (2,000 ft) over its 101 kilometres (63 mi) course.

== Etymology ==
Initially named Clyde by Lachlan Macquarie, the use of the Aboriginal name became prevalent subsequently.

== See also ==
- Karuah River bridge, Monkerai
- Rivers of New South Wales
- List of rivers of New South Wales (A–K)
- List of rivers of Australia
