= Mammy Johnsons River =

River in Australia

Coordinates: 32°15′S 152°03′E

Mammy Johnsons River Mammy Johnsons Creek

Location
- Country: Australia
- State: New South Wales
- Region: NSW North Coast (IBRA), Mid North Coast, Upper Hunter
- Local government area: Mid-Coast Council

Physical characteristics
- Source: Great Dividing Range
  - location: below Winns Mountain, northwest of Bulahdelah
  - elevation: 408 m (1,339 ft)
- Mouth: confluence with the Karuah River
  - location: north northwest of Stroud
  - elevation: 37 m (121 ft)
- Length: 55 km (34 mi)

Basin features
- River system: Mid-Coast Council
- Tributaries
  - left: Jeir Creek, Black Bullock Creek
  - right: Wards River, Terreel Creek
- National park: Ghin-Doo-Ee

Mammy Johnsons River, a mostly perennial river of the Mid-Coast Council system, is located in the Mid North Coast and Upper Hunter regions of New South Wales, Australia.

== Course and features ==
Mammy Johnsons River rises on the southwestern slopes of the Great Dividing Range, below Winns Mountain, north northwest of Bulahdelah, and flows generally north, west and south, joined by four tributaries including Wards River, before reaching its confluence with the Karuah River north northwest of Stroud. The river descends 371 metres (1,217 ft) over its 55 kilometres (34 mi) course.

== See also ==
- Rivers of New South Wales
- List of rivers of New South Wales (L–Z)
- List of rivers of Australia
