= Wards River =

Coordinates: 32°15′S 151°57′E

- Etymology: In honour of William Ward, a founding director of AA Co

Location
- Country: Australia
- State: New South Wales
- Region: NSW North Coast (IBRA), Mid North Coast, Upper Hunter
- Local government area: Mid-Coast Council

Physical characteristics
- Source: Kyle Range, Great Dividing Range
  - location: near Waukivory, Gloucester
  - elevation: 399 m (1,309 ft)
- Mouth: confluence with the Mammy Johnsons River
  - location: Johnsons Creek, near Stroud
  - elevation: 65 m (213 ft)
- Length: 31 km (19 mi)

Basin features
- River system: Mid-Coast Council
- Tributaries
  - right: Spring Creek (New South Wales)

Wards River, a mostly perennial river of the Mid-Coast Council system, is located in the Mid North Coast and Upper Hunter regions of New South Wales, Australia.

== Course and features ==
Wards River rises within Kyle Range of the Great Dividing Range, near Waukivory, south southeast of Gloucester, and flows generally west and south, joined by one minor tributary, before reaching its confluence with Mammy Johnsons River at the locale of Johnsons Creek, north of Stroud. The river descends 334 metres (1,096 ft) over its 31 kilometres (19 mi) course.

First surveyed by European explorers during the 1820s, the river was named in honour of William Ward, a founding director of Australian Agricultural Company.

== See also ==
- Rivers of New South Wales
- List of rivers of New South Wales (L–Z)
- List of rivers of Australia
