= Edward Riley (pastoralist) =

Edward Riley (30 January 1784 – 21 February 1825) was a merchant and early pastoralist in Sydney, Australia. Born in London to George Riley Sr., a well-educated bookseller, and Margaret Raby, he was the younger brother of Alexander Riley and the first person in his family to be interested by colonial life, moving to Calcutta and trading between Canton and Australia. William Rubinstein listed Edward Riley as being Australia's ninth richest man ever in Australian history in terms of current GDP Value.

Riley began his career as a merchant shipping rum, clothing and food from Calcutta, India to his brother, Alexander and Richard Jones in New South Wales.

Riley Street in Sydney is named after Edward Riley.

== Marriage and family ==
Riley married Ann Moran in 1805 in Calcutta, India. Their first son, Edward, was born in Calcutta in 1806 and a second son, George Riley by 1810. Ann Riley (née Moran) died in Calcutta on 13 May 1810. Riley remarried in 1813 to Ann Wilkinson, the daughter of a Colonel in Calcutta. Edward and Ann left India on the brig Guide to settle in New South Wales, arriving in Sydney in May 1816 on the Lynx, after first spending a couple of months in Hobart Town where Edward's sister, Elizabeth Fenn Kemp (née Riley) lived with her husband, Anthony Fenn Kemp, and family.

Edward and Ann (née Wilkinson) had five children, Anna Sophia (1816 - 10 May 1881), Alexander William (born 1817), James John (11 September 1821 - 20 August 1882), Charles (born 1822) and Frances Elizabeth (born 21 August 1824).

== New South Wales ==
In August 1817, Riley was appointed to be a member of the Governor's Court. In February 1818, he was elected as a Director of the Bank of New South Wales, resigning this position in January 1819. In February 1821, Riley was appointed as a Magistrate for the Territory of New South Wales.

Edward and his family were living at Ultimo House, once the home of Surgeon John Harris and regarded as one of the finest houses in the colony, when son, James John, and daughter, Frances Elizabeth, were born in 1821 and 1824 respectively.

An article in The Sydney Gazette and New South Wales Advertiser of 1 July 1824 entitled "The Fashionable World" reported that at Ultimo House that evening "the present occupant of Ultimo, EDWARD RILEY, Esq. gives a magnificent entertainment to a very large Assembly. Mr. RILEY is on the eve of removing to his charming and picturesque retreat of Wooloomooloo."

== Death ==
On 21 February 1825, Riley committed suicide. His death was reported in The Sydney Gazette and New South Wales Advertiser of Thursday, 24 February 1825 as follows:

"Death. At his residence in Wooloomooloo, on Monday last, Edward Riley, Esq, a Justice of the Peace for the Territory of New South Wales, and the senior Partner in the Firm of Riley and Walker. This Gentlemen has long been an inhabitant of this Colony, in which he was not only an active Magistrate, but also one of the most honorable and indefatigable Merchants. For these last two or three months, Mr. Riley laboured under severe indisposition, attended with hypochondriac symptoms, that induced mental derangement; in one of which ... unfortunate Gentleman destroyed himself, by means of a pistol, about 10 minutes prior to eleven o'clock on Monday forenoon : the ball is said to have entered beneath the chin, and found its way through the back part of the head, causing instant death. An Inquest was convened the same day on the melancholy occasion, and a Verdict returned of Insanity. Mrs. RILEY, an amiable and afflicted widow, is left with a large family, to deplore the sudden deprivation of a fond husband, and an excellent father. The deceased was interred on Tuesday, in the Church-yard of Parramatta."

Riley's widow, Ann (née Wilkinson) died in May 1830.

== Estate ==
Following the death of Riley's eldest son, Edward Riley (1806–1840) in June 1840, Edward Riley's estate was the subject of an 1841 Supreme Court of New South Wales judgement in which the extent of Edward Riley's estate was described: "The estates in question appear to consist first of about a quarter of an acre of land at the corner of Hunter and George-street, one hundred acres with a capital mansion and offices erected thereon, at Woolloomooloo, five acres, with a mill erected thereon, at the Surry Hills, six other acres in the same place, a farm of two hundred acres in the District of Minto, with a house and offices erected thereon, three thousand and thirty acres at Mittagong, and five hundred acres at the same place."

== Descendants ==
Edward Riley (1806–1840)

Anna Sophia Riley married Robert Campbell (1804–1859), second son of Robert Campbell (1769–1846), New South Wales merchant, pastoralist, politician and philanthropist, and his wife Sophia, née Palmer.

Alexander William Riley (1818 - 1870) Captain in the British army and ancestor of Rear Admiral George Fawkes

James John Riley (1821–1882) married Christiana Blomfield, daughter of Lieutenant Thomas Valentine Blomfield and his wife, Christiana Brooks; and granddaughter of Captain Richard Brooks. James John Riley was the first Mayor of Penrith, New South Wales.
