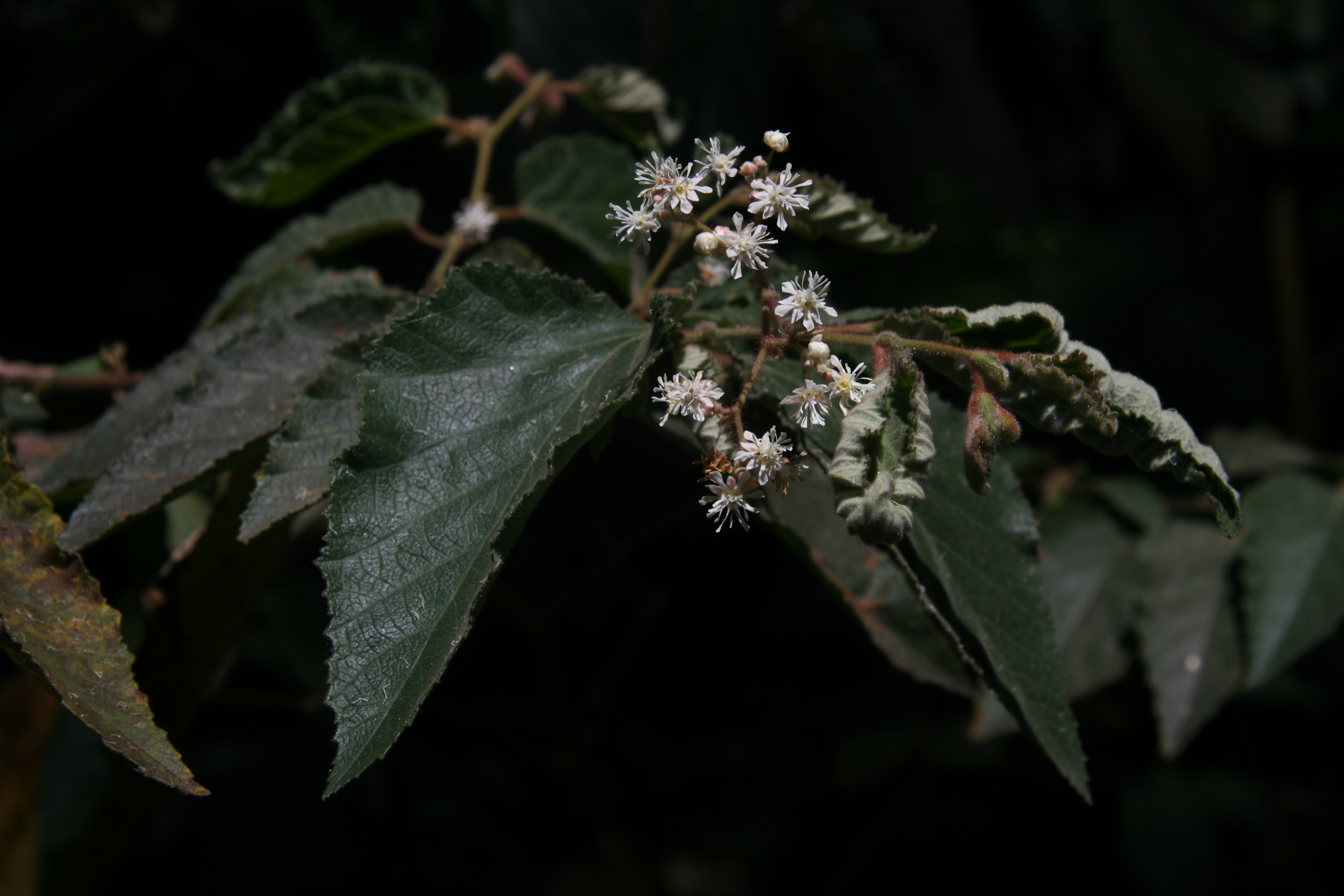

Scientific classification
- Kingdom: Plantae
- Clade: Embryophytes
- Clade: Tracheophytes
- Clade: Spermatophytes
- Clade: Angiosperms
- Clade: Eudicots
- Clade: Rosids
- Order: Malvales
- Family: Malvaceae
- Genus: Androcalva
- Species: A. fraseri

Binomial name
- Androcalva fraseri (J.Gay) C.F.Wilkins & Whitlock

Synonyms
- Commerconia fraseri F.Muell. orth. var.; Commersonia fraseri J.Gay; Commersonia fraseri J.Gay var. fraseri; Commersonia fraseri var. macrophylla J.Gay; Commersonia fraseri var. microphylla J.Gay; Restiaria fraseri (Gay) Kuntze

= Androcalva fraseri =

Brush kurrajong

Species of tree

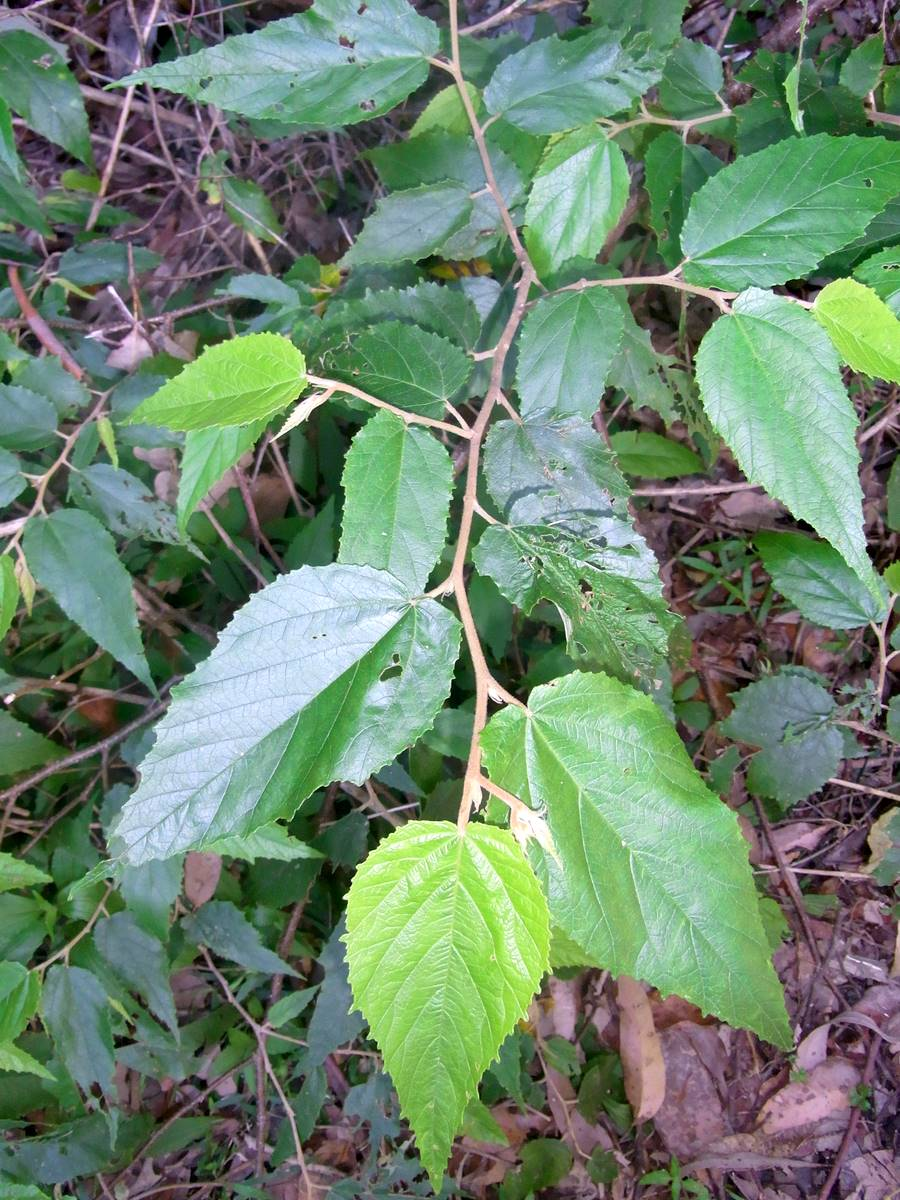
Foliage, near the Telegherry River

Androcalva fraseri, commonly known as blackfellow's hemp or brush kurrajong, is a species of flowering plant in the family Malvaceae and is endemic to eastern Australia. It is a small tree or shrub that forms suckers and has egg-shaped or lance-shaped leaves with serrated edges, and clusters of 13 to 21 white flowers.

== Description ==
Androcalva fraseri is a small tree or shrub that typically grows to 3–9 m (9.8–29.5 ft) high and 2–4 m (6 ft 7 in – 13 ft 1 in) wide, forms suckers and has a trunk up to 15 cm (5.9 in) in diameter. The leaves are arranged alternately along the stems, egg-shaped to broadly triangular, or broadly lance-shaped to heart-shaped, 6–160 mm (0.2–6.3 in) long and 50–80 mm (2.0–3.1 in) wide on a petiole up to 15 mm (0.6 in) long with stipules 2–3 mm (0.08–0.1 in) long at the base but that fall off as the leaves mature. The edges of the leaves are irregularly toothed, the upper surface is dull green and sparsely hairy, the lower surface covered with fine, silvery, star-shaped hairs. The flowers are white, arranged in clusters of 13 to 21 on a peduncle 30–110 mm (1.2–4.3 in) long, each flower on a pedicel 3–8 mm (0.1–0.3 in) long, with bracts 2–12 mm (0.08–0.5 in) long at the base. The flowers are 6–10 mm (0.2–0.4 in) wide with 5 white, petal-like sepals and 5 petals, the ligule slightly longer than the sepals. There are 3 staminodes between each pair of stamens, the central one spatula-shaped and the other two linear. Flowering occurs from August to April, with a peak from September to November, and the fruit is a bristly capsule 15–20 mm (0.6–0.8 in) in diameter.

== Taxonomy ==
The French naturalist Jaques Étienne Gay was the first to formally describe the species in 1823. He gave it the name Commersonia fraseri and published the description in the journal, Mémoires du Muséum d'Histoire Naturelle from specimens collected by Charles Fraser.

A 2011 molecular analysis of segments of chloroplast DNA found that the genera Commersonia and Rulingia formed a monophyletic group but that the member species were intermingled, and split out into two hitherto unrecognised clades. In 2011, Carolyn Wilkins and Barbara Whitlock transferred the species to Androcalva as A. fraseri.

The specific epithet honours Charles Fraser, the collector of the type specimens and an early New South Wales colonial botanist.

== Distribution and habitat ==
Androcalva fraseri is found in rainforest and wet eucalypt forest along and east of the Great Dividing Range in New South Wales and southeastern Queensland. In the latter habitat, it is associated with trees, such as rough-barked apple (Angophora floribunda), turpentine (Syncarpia glomulifera), and Sydney blue gum (Eucalyptus saligna). A fast-growing plant, it is able to colonise disturbed ground, particularly areas where vegetation has been partly cleared such as under power lines.

== Ecology ==
This species is an adult host plant for the chrysomelid beetle Podagra submetallica.

== Use in horticulture ==
Androcalva fraseri has been propagated readily from cuttings taken in winter, and grows better with extra moisture in cultivation.
