= Anthony Fenn Kemp =

Australian judge

Anthony Fenn Kemp (1773 – 28 October 1868) was a soldier, merchant and a deputy judge advocate of the colony of New South Wales (the predecessor to the Australian State). He was one of the key participants in the "Rum Rebellion" that removed William Bligh, the appointed governor of the colony, and established an interim military government. He was later permitted to settle in Van Diemen's Land and became a successful merchant and farmer there.

== Early years ==
Kemp was born in England, near Aldgate, London, probably around 1773. He was educated in Greenwich, London. After finishing school, he travelled to the United States and to France. On his return, he purchased a commission as an ensign in the New South Wales Corps, a regiment raised in England specifically to maintain discipline in the colony of New South Wales. It later was to become known as the Rum Corps, because of the monopoly by its officers on the supply of the liquor in the early years of the colony.

== New South Wales years ==
Kemp arrived in Sydney with his regiment in 1795. He served in Sydney and also on Norfolk Island, which was then a settlement of New South Wales. In 1797, he was promoted to lieutenant. In November 1799, he was granted a lease of land in the centre of Sydney where he built a shop. At that time, it was common for senior military officers to be granted land to settle and farm in the colonies. Kemp prospered in the colony. As paymaster for his company and then later paymaster for the whole of the corps, he was able to use his position to trade his "wares at high prices".

map of present-day New South Wales

Kemp returned to England on leave in 1800, and was promoted to the rank of captain in 1801. He returned to Sydney in 1802 where he married Elizabeth Riley, sister of early New South Wales merchants and pastoralists, Alexander Riley and Edward Riley and daughter of London bookseller George Riley. In the same year, he was received as a freemason in what is thought to have been the first lodge assembled in Australia.

The arrival of a French expedition in 1802 is an illustration of Kemp's attitude to his economic interests in the colony. French Captain Nicholas Baudin brought a cargo of brandy to sell. The governor, Philip King, refused to allow the cargo to be landed, probably due to the then English monopolies on the sale of goods. After various arguments with Baudin, Kemp alleged that Baudin was illegally selling the brandy on shore. The governor investigated the matter. Kemp was forced to apologise to Baudin after the governor determined that there was no evidence of the sale.

This led, in 1803, to Kemp being involved in a pamphlet war denouncing the governor. For this, Kemp was court martialled along with two other junior officers. He was saved by Major George Johnston (who was later a key player in the Rum Rebellion). Johnston ordered the arrest of John Harris, the presiding officer at Kemp's court-martial. This was for allegedly revealing the voting of two other officers in an earlier court martial. Although Harris was later exonerated, he was replaced by deputy judge advocate Richard Atkins, and Kemp was acquitted.

In 1804, Kemp was appointed second-in-command of the new settlement at Port Dalrymple, which is now the town of George Town in Tasmania. During his commander's absence, he administered the settlement, but disaffection with him grew and eventually a planned insurrection had to be averted by arresting its leaders.

== Role in the Rum Rebellion ==
Kemp returned to Sydney in 1807, where he was to play an important part in 1808 in the rebellion against Governor William Bligh. On 25 January, Kemp was the senior military officer on the Court of Criminal Jurisdiction, which had been called to try John Macarthur for the charge of sedition. Kemp was the second most senior member of the bench; the senior member was the deputy judge advocate Atkins. Atkins was a drunk and also owed Macarthur and others great deals of money. At the trial, Macarthur with 'a great torrent of threats and abusive language' alleged that Atkins was unfit for the bench.

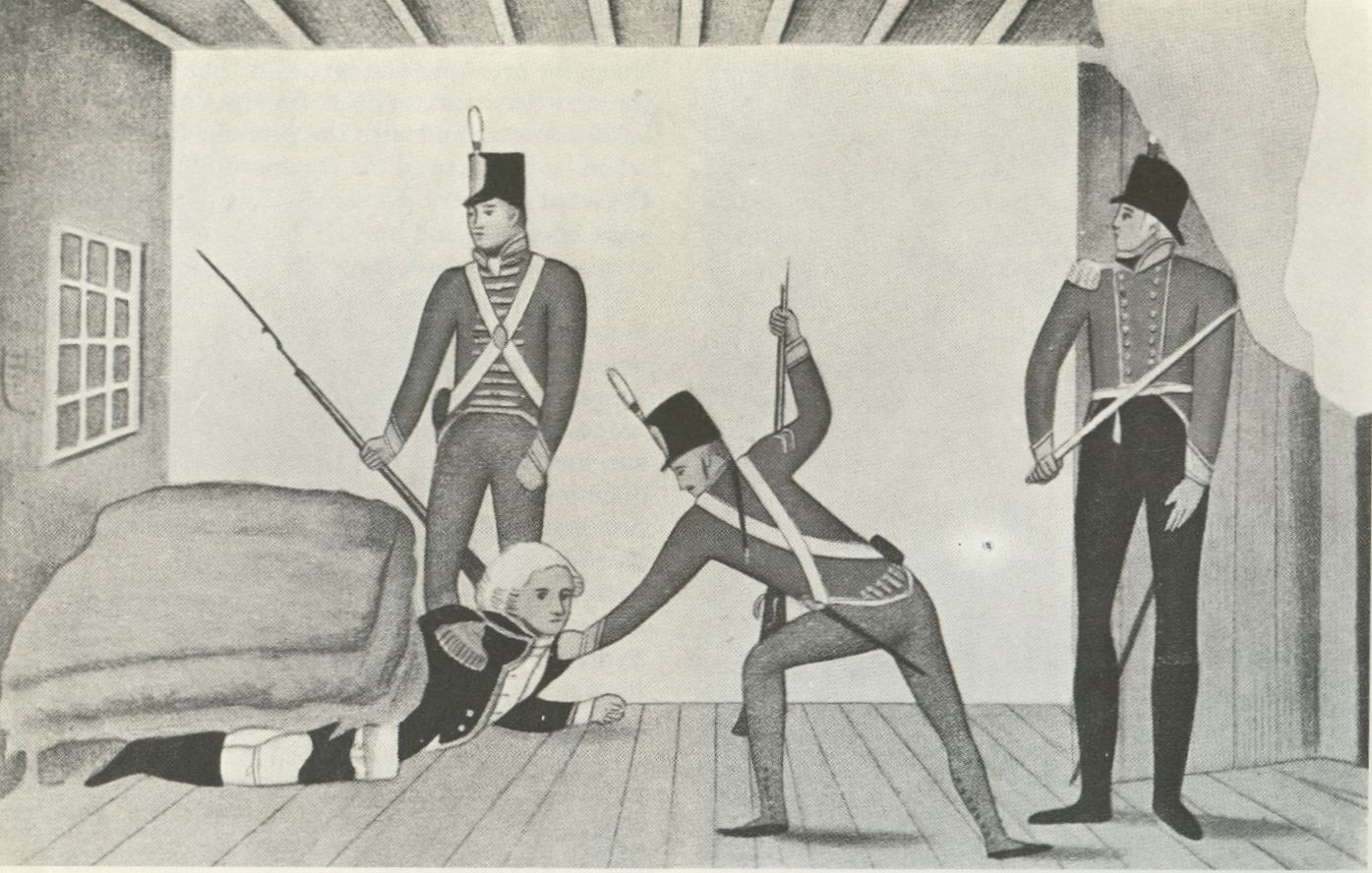
A propaganda cartoon of Bligh's arrest in Sydney in 1808, portraying Bligh as a coward

Atkins threatened to commit Macarthur for contempt, but Kemp threatened to commit Atkins for contempt himself. Atkins adjourned the court and left for the safety of the governor's office, whilst Kemp and his fellow officers wrote reporting the matter to Bligh. Bligh reminded the officers that the court could not be constituted without Atkins' presence and that the court papers should be returned. When Kemp and the others refused, Bligh recommended that they be charged for treasonable practices.

The following day, Kemp and other officers informed Bligh that he should resign as governor and that his safety would be guaranteed out of the colony. Bligh refused, and Johnston removed Bligh from office.

Johnston then removed Atkins from the position of deputy judge advocate and appointed Kemp in his stead. One of the cases in the Court of Criminal Jurisdiction to be tried by Kemp was that of provost-marshal William Gore who was charged with perjury. Kemp did not consider disqualifying himself from the case even though he was one of those accusing Gore of perjury. Kemp was also part of the court that subsequently acquitted Macarthur of the earlier charges, an outcome predictable even if Atkins had been allowed to sit on the bench. Kemp did not to remain in office and was replaced by Grimes when Kemp was posted as the commandant at Parramatta.

Kemp returned to England in 1810 and was a witness at the court martial of Johnston for the rebellion. Kemp escaped being court martialled himself, but he was allowed to sell his commission, and his land grants in Sydney were cancelled. He became a partner in a commercial venture in England, but later went bankrupt.

== Years in Van Diemen's Land ==
Kemp returned to Australia in 1816 and settled in Van Diemen's Land. He received a grant of 700 acres (2.8 km^{2}) at Green Ponds, north of Hobart. He received further grants in 1829 and also purchased or obtained leases on further land. Kemp become a leading figure among graziers, merchants, importers and shippers in the area. He bred sheep and, according to his biographers, apparently helped pioneer the Tasmanian wool industry. He was also the first to import red deer into Tasmania. Kemp was a director and also at one time chairman of the Van Diemen's Land Bank, and set up various mercantile and shipping businesses based in Hobart.

Map of present-day Tasmania

In that year 1817, Kemp was appointed a justice of the peace (commonly known as a magistrate at the time). He was involved in a series of quarrels with Lieutenant Governors Thomas Davey and William Sorell. He circulated notice around the settlement that Sorell was living with a married woman not his wife (which he was). He later wrote to Lord Bathurst, as well as the Bishop of London, and Governor Lachlan Macquarie about these matters. Eventually, Sorell suspended Kemp and made a report to Macquarie. Macquarie confirmed the suspension, but cautioned Sorell not to take Kemp to a court of law. Macquarie said to Sorell that if the "wily and obsessive" Kemp's economic interests were threatened, he was likely to react with "explosive violence". Kemp was a critic of Sorell, but later changed his mind. It may have been when one of Kemp's daughters married one of Sorell's sons. Or, it could have been a realisation that the next lieutenant-governor might not be as generous with land grants. Kemp was even to become the chair of a committee of petitioners to have Sorell's term extended, but this petition was declined by London.

Kemp continued to have problems with the administration, and had run-ins with the next Lieutenant-Governor George Arthur. Kemp was re-appointed a justice of the peace by a subsequent lieutenant-governor John Franklin in 1837.

== Death ==
Kemp's wife Elizabeth died in October 1865, aged 79. Kemp lived to the age of 95, dying at Sandy Bay on 28 October 1868. He was buried in St George's Church of England cemetery in Albuera Street, Battery Point, Hobart.

The area in Sydney where Kemp's first land grant was located is now known as Kemp's Creek. The town which developed in Van Diemen's Land in the area where Kemp had his largest land holdings was renamed Kempton in 1840, the original name of Green Ponds being used as the name for the municipality and the general area. Kemp is sometimes referred to as the "Father of Tasmania". This is said to be an allusion to the number of his children (seven sons and eleven daughters) and grandchildren who married into other prominent families in Tasmania.

== Descendants ==
Kemp's daughter Elizabeth married William Sorell, Junior, son of William Sorell, Governor of Tasmania. Her daughter Julia would marry Thomas Arnold, making novelist Mary Augusta Ward, who wrote as Mrs Humphry Ward, Kemp's great granddaughter, along with her siblings suffragette Ethel Arnold, scholar Julia Huxley, and journalist William Thomas Arnold. This also made him great great grandfather of novelist Aldous Huxley, eugenistic Julian Huxley, and physiologist Andrew Huxley.

His great great nephew is novelist Nicholas Shakespeare.
