= Thomas Valentine Blomfield =

Australian settler (1793–1857)

Thomas Valentine Blomfield (14 February 1793 – 19 May 1857) was a British soldier, pioneer New South Wales settler and pastoralist, magistrate, Justice of the Peace and Liverpool District Council member.

== Birth ==
Thomas was born on Valentine’s Day, 14 February 1793, in Suffolk, England and christened Valentine Thomas Blomfield on 18 February 1793 at Old Newton, Suffolk. His parents were Thomas Blomfield (1750–1833) and Mary Manning (née Seaman).

== Military career ==
On 8 June 1809 (aged 16), Thomas enlisted as an Ensign in the 2nd Battalion of the 48th (Northamptonshire) Regiment of Foot in the British Army. On 17 June 1811, he was promoted to the rank of lieutenant. He served in the Peninsular War and was awarded the Military General Service Medal, with clasps for Busaco (1810), Albuera (1811), Ciudad Rodrigo (1812), Badajoz (1812), Salamanca (1812), Vittoria (1813), Orthes (1814) and Toulouse (1814).

In February and August 1815, Thomas wrote to his family from Limerick, Ireland. The battle-weary 48th regiment had returned to Ireland on 19 June 1814 and fought in several of the American battles but were mainly garrisoned in southern Ireland. From 1817 until 1824, the 48th Regiment of Foot was stationed in Australia. Thomas arrived on the ship "Dick" on 3 August 1817 with a detachment of his regiment which had been ordered for service in New South Wales.

== Settlement in New South Wales ==
In a letter to his father dated 4 September 1820, Thomas announced his marriage had taken place in New South Wales on 3 August 1820 "to Christiana Jane Brooks, eldest daughter of Richard Brooks, Esq., a respectable settler and a magistrate of the Territory". Thomas and Christiana were married at St Philip's Church, Sydney.

His wife, Christiana Jane Brooks (1802–1852), was born on 15 January 1802 in Surrey, England, the eldest daughter of Captain Richard Brooks (c1763-1833) and Christiana Eliza Passmore (1776–1835). Christiana spent her childhood in Greenmile, Kent, England. She arrived in New South Wales, aged 12, in March 1814 on the Spring with her parents, older brother and four younger sisters. Another sister was born that year in New South Wales.

In a letter dated 4 September 1820 to his father, Thomas described Christiana:

"She is of a fair complexion, about 5ft 5 inches in height, fair hair and dark brown eyes and, of course, in my opinion, not ugly."

Both Thomas and Christiana were prolific letter writers and many of these have been preserved in a collection published in 1926 entitled "Memoirs of the Blomfield family being letters written by the Late Captain T. V. Blomfield and his wife to relatives in England".

Thomas continued in the Army until January 1824 when he sold out his commission. He settled on land he named "Dagworth" (after the farm where he was born), an estate of 2,000 acres (8.1 km^{2}) on the Hunter River, granted to him on 21 April 1825.

In a letter to her niece, Louisa, dated 2 June 1825, Thomas’ wife Christiana describes her husband:

"Uncle Thomas has very dark hair, a high forehead, dark blue eyes, rather a short nose, a small mouth with a fine set of very white teeth, which he shows very much when he laughs; a very black beard, and nice black whiskers. Altogether he has a round face, a cheerful good-tempered countenance habitually when he laughs, which he does often and most heartily. In height he is five feet seven, and in my opinion a very good figure, and I know several young ladies who used to think so, too, when he was a bachelor. Oh, you'll enjoy meeting him! He is such a joy!"

Thomas is ranked as one of the pioneering band whose early settlement and recognition of its possibilities contributed to the development of the Monaro area in New South Wales. In 1848, when the applicants for leases were gazetted, Thomas sought to obtain Run No. 8, known as Collarnatong, consisting of 35,000 acres (140 km^{2}) and the boundaries whereof, as set out in the Gazette, refer to neighboring runs as being those of Messrs Cassels, Brooks, Brierly and Eccleston.

After the death of Christiana’s parents, Captain Richard Brooks in 1833 and Christiana Brooks in 1835, the Brooks' property "Denham Court" near Liverpool passed to Christiana and Thomas Blomfield where Thomas lived until his death on 19 May 1857. He was buried in the small churchyard at the Church of St Mary the Virgin near Denham Court in Ingleburn. Christiana had died five years earlier on 31 October 1852 at Denham Court and was also buried in the churchyard of the Church of St Mary the Virgin.

== Public service ==
On 1 November 1834, Thomas's appointment as a magistrate was published in The Sydney Gazette and New South Wales Advertiser:

His Excellency the Governor has been pleased to appoint the undermentioned Gentlemen to be Magistrates of the Territory, viz. Thomas Valentine Blomfield, of Dagworth, Hunter's River and Denham Court, in the County of Cumberland, Esquire; and Charles Boydell, of Cam. Yr. Allyn Hunter's River, Esq.

On 9 August 1848, Thomas was listed in the District Council appointments published in The Sydney Morning Herald:

Liverpool. – Messrs, John Brown Bossley and Thomas Valentine Blomfield, to hold office until the 1st May, 1851.

On 27 October 1851, Thomas was amongst a large list of appointees as Justices of the Peace published in The Sydney Morning Herald. He had earlier appeared in a list of "The New Commission" published in The Sydney Herald on 7 January 1836 which is thought also to include Justices of the Peace.

== Children ==
Thomas and Christiana had 12 children:

1. Thomas Edwin Blomfield (1821–1903) – Lieutenant-Colonel in the British Army
2. Richard Henry Blomfield (1823–1896)
3. John Roe Blomfield (1824–1889) – Anglican priest
4. Christiana Eliza Passmore Blomfield (1826–1904) – married James John Riley (1821–1882), Mayor of Penrith and son of Edward Riley
5. Louisa Matilda Blomfield (1828–1858)
6. Barrington Wingfield Blomfield (1830–1835)
7. Arthur Blomfield (1831–1887) – Monaro pioneer – married Ann Mackenzie, daughter of John Mackenzie (1793–1857)
8. Henry Wilson Blomfield (1833–1924)
9. Edwin Cordeaux Blomfield (1835–1913)
10. Euston Blomfield (1837)
11. Frank Allman Blomfield (1840)
12. Alfred Blomfield (1842–1901)

In 1839, Christiana’s sister, Honoria Rose Riley (née Brooks) died leaving three young orphans. Honoria had been left a widow about three years before when her husband, William E Riley (c1808 – 1836) died. The three children raised by Christiana and Thomas, in addition to their own 11 surviving children, were:

1. Alexander Raby Riley (1833) – Attended school conducted by the Church of England clergyman, Dr William Woolls, and was one of the first matriculants to the University of Sydney (aged 19) in 1852.
2. Christiana Sarah Riley (1836) – married William Essington King
3. Margaret Maria Riley (1837) – married Thomas Alexander Browne (best known as novelist, Rolf Boldrewood) (1826–1915), and herself published The flower garden in Australia. A book for Ladies and Amateurs under the pseudonym Mrs Boldrewood.
