= The Branch River =

Coordinates: 32°33′S 152°00′E

The Branch River Sandy Creek, The Branch, Larpent River

Location
- Country: Australia
- State: New South Wales
- Region: NSW North Coast (IBRA), Mid North Coast, Upper Hunter
- Local government area: Mid-Coast Council

Physical characteristics
- Source: Great Dividing Range
  - location: below Girvan, south southwest of Bulahdelah
  - elevation: 61 m (200 ft)
- Mouth: confluence with the Karuah River
  - location: north of Karuah
  - elevation: 0 m (0 ft)
- Length: 27 km (17 mi)

Basin features
- River system: Mid-Coast Council
- Tributaries
  - left: Blue Gum Creek, Kelly Creek, Little Branch Creek, Boomerang Creek
  - right: Lewis Creek (New South Wales)

The Branch River, a watercourse of the Mid-Coast Council system, is located in the Mid North Coast and Upper Hunter regions of New South Wales, Australia.

== Course and features ==
The Branch River rises on south west of the settlement of Crawford River, below Girvan, south southwest of Bulahdelah, and flows generally south and then southwest, joined by five minor tributaries, before reaching its confluence with the Karuah River north of Karuah. The river descends 62 metres (203 ft) over its 27 kilometres (17 mi) course.

== See also ==
- Rivers of New South Wales
- List of rivers of New South Wales (L–Z)
- List of rivers of Australia
