= Cooreei Bridge =

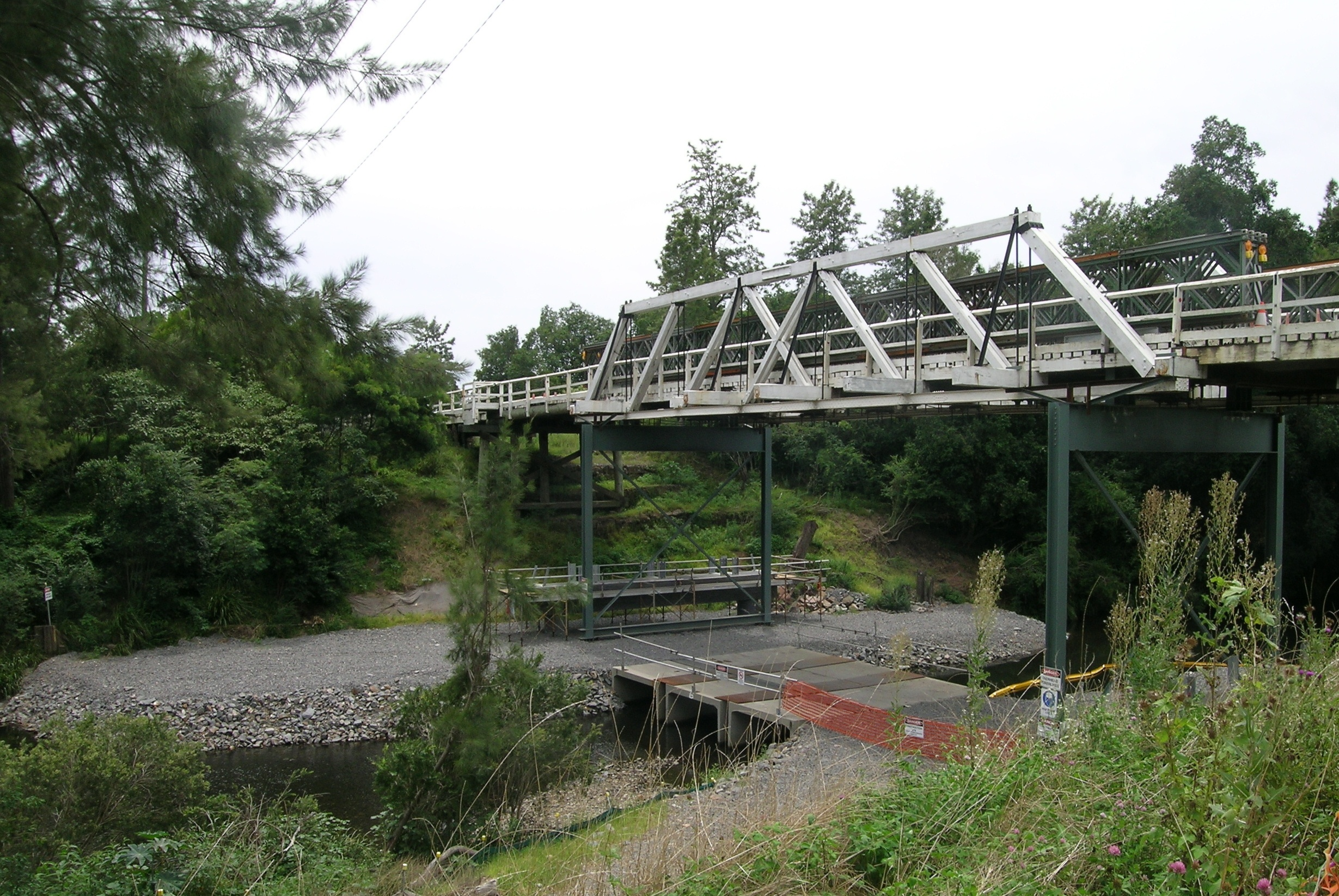
- Cooreei Bridge over the Williams River
- Coordinates: 32°23′48″S 151°45′50″E
- Carries: Main Road
- Crosses: Williams River
- Locale: Dungog, New South Wales, Australia
- Owner: Transport for NSW

Characteristics
- Design: Dare truss
- Material: Timber
- Trough construction: Wrought iron

History
- Designer: W. J. Hanna
- Constructed by: W. Oakes
- Construction cost: A£1,995
- Opened: 1905

New South Wales Heritage Register
- Official name: Cooreei Bridge over Williams River
- Type: State heritage (built)
- Designated: 20 June 2000
- Reference no.: 1465
- Type: Road Bridge
- Category: Transport – Land

The Cooreei Bridge over Williams River is a heritage-listed road bridge that carries Main Road across Williams River in Dungog, New South Wales, Australia. The property is owned by Transport for NSW. It was added to the New South Wales State Heritage Register on 20 June 2000.

== History ==
The Dare truss road bridge was built in 1905. It replaced an 1873 bridge of the same name which had been condemned due to its dangerous condition. It was designed and constructed under the direction of Commissioner and Principal Engineer for Roads and Bridges W. J. Hanna with W. Oakes as the contractor. The cost of the bridge, the iron being provided by the Government, was A£1,995.

== Heritage listing ==
Cooreei Bridge over Williams River was listed on the New South Wales State Heritage Register on 20 June 2000.

== See also ==
- Historic bridges of New South Wales
- List of bridges in Australia
