= Stroud House (Stroud, New South Wales) =

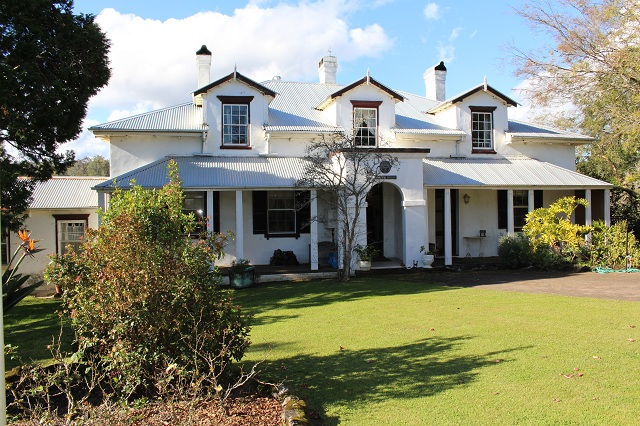

- Location within New South Wales Location within Australia
- 32.4021°S 151.9666°E
- Location: 42 Cowper Street, Stroud, Mid-Coast Council, New South Wales, Australia

History
- Built: 1827–1839

Site notes
- Architect: Thomas Laman
- Owner: Private ownership

New South Wales Heritage Register
- Official name: Stroud House
- Type: state heritage (built)
- Designated: 4 March 2016
- Reference no.: 1969
- Type: House
- Category: Residential buildings (private)
- Builders: AACo convict labour force

Stroud House is a heritage-listed residence at 42 Cowper Street, Stroud, Mid-Coast Council, New South Wales, Australia. It was built from 1827 to 1839. It was added to the New South Wales State Heritage Register on 4 March 2016.

== History ==
Emerging from the industrial depression of the Napoleonic Wars (1803-1815), Britain sought to recover its textile trade to address growing demands for wool production. Previously sourced offshore from the Mediterranean and Germany, Britain sought to establish its own fine wool sources to provide increased supply and control of the product to the British market and return increased profits to the economy. The British colony in Australia, with its seemingly endless landscape to accommodate sheep flocks and substantial convict labour force to tend them, was soon regarded as the future of the British pastoral industry.

Having received the Bigge reports on the status of the Australian colony in 1822 and 1823, the British Parliament commenced its colonial plans and incorporated the Australian Agricultural Company (the AACo) in 1824. The first of Australia's large-scale agricultural companies, the AACo was allocated one million pounds to take up one million acres of land outside and beyond the limits of the settled area of the Australian colony. Funded largely by prominent wealthy and enterprising British gentlemen, who in-turn became shareholders in the company, the AACo was tasked with using the first major influx of private capital into the colony to raise fine wool sheep, breed cattle and horses for company use and cultivate agricultural crops to export to Britain and sustain the colony.

A mammoth proposal with strong financial backing, the AACo would receive direction from a Court of Directors in Britain, be supervised by a Colonial Committee in Australia and run by a resident manager on the company estate. Seeking to augment an income tarnished by the depression, Welsh pastoral farmer Robert Dawson was appointed as the chief managing agent of the AACo.

Arriving in Australia in 1825 with fellow company employees and early stocks of sheep, cattle and horses, Dawson immediately set out to explore the unsettled land north of the Hunter Valley to settle the company. Previously sighted from the coast, the harbour of Port Stephens had already been recorded and the still deep water considered suitable for the development of a shipping transportation port. Under some pressure to clear land quickly and commence construction of facilities for the new company estate, Dawson visited the region and observed (perhaps romantically) the fresh water of its rivers, the rich alluvial flats suited to agricultural cultivation, the lightly timbered rolling hills and the availability of shell and lime that would be useful in the construction of the company's buildings and facilities.

Unbeknownst to Dawson at the time, he had observed the area at the height of its good season, without flooding and when fresh water rivers ran freely. Reported by Dawson as reminding him of the "gentleman's park and grounds" of Britain and deemed to be suitable to the objectives of the new company, the area of Port Stephens and the land to the north was soon recommended to the Colonial Committee as the prospective AACo estate. Keen to commence the company's activities, the Colonial Committee accepted Dawson's recommendation and selected one million acres of land between Port Stephens to the south, the Manning River to the north, the Great Dividing Range to the west and the Pacific Ocean to the east.

In early 1826, Dawson led the first major party of AACo staff and supplies from Sydney to Port Stephens to begin construction of the company's headquarters and first town at Carrington. The new company was to be a self-sufficient and self-contained community in the unsettled landscape and Dawson relied heavily on the varied skills of the company's staff, coupled with the convict labour force and the assistance of the local Aboriginal people, to establish and prepare the AACo headquarters and the early company roads and land in a few short months.

Once the AACo had been established at Carrington, Dawson set out in late 1826 to explore the Port Stephens Estate further. A short distance away, the alluvial flats of Stroud were selected as the site of the company's principal agricultural farm and second township. Establishment works commenced immediately and, by the Colonial Committee's visit in 1827, it was pronounced that Stroud possessed "advantages for every purpose of Agriculture, whether arable or grazing".

Although the company's establishment and early activities were undertaken with vigour, the shortcomings of early company decisions soon became apparent. Receiving direction from Britain, from a board with no colonial experience, saw lengthy time delays in communications between the parties. As the company was established and quickly expanding within a short period, much of the decisions became the responsibility of the company's manager and its Colonial Committee.

The failings of Dawson's early decisions also became clear. Based on limited time to explore the region and observe its true nature, the selection of the company's one million acres proved to be misjudged. The coastal landscape, both its soil quality and humidity, was unsuitable for agricultural pursuits and sheep grazing. The harbour of Port Stephens was found to not be suitable for berthing ships and the company's headquarters at Carrington proved to be flood-prone.

The insufficiencies of the estate landscape, and claims about incompetence and company mismanagement, caused a division between Dawson and the Colonial Committee which led to Dawson leaving the company and returning to Britain in 1828.

Shocked by the preceding events and the prospect that the Port Stephens Estate was ultimately unsuitable for the objectives of the company, the board of directors decided to dispense with the Colonial Committee and appointed a resident commissioner to manage the company affairs. By late 1829, Captain Edward Parry RN (an Arctic explorer and navigator) had arrived in the colony to restore order and management to the estate and assess options to improve its future returns.

As Stroud was progressing as the principal town and possible future centre of the AACo, Parry chose to live in Stroud with his family during the company's shearing and harvest season. To accommodate the Parry family, an existing AACo cottage (built in 1827 and once considered to be a 'humble hovel'), underwent extensive renovations to convert it into a stately dwelling suitable for Parry and any future company leaders and visiting guests. By 1832, Stroud House was complete.

During his four-year term with the AACo, Parry sought out new and more suitable tracts of land for the company's activities and was successful in negotiating complex sales and exchanges to obtain more productive land for the company in the New England Plains. With Parry's efforts, the AACo soon returned a profit but success was quickly followed by the collapse of London's wool trade in 1836 and the British financial crisis of the late 1830s.

Stroud prospered during the 1830s with the construction of many of its buildings and facilities and a notable rise in its population numbers. In 1839, Stroud House also became the periodic home of Parry's successor and new AACo resident commissioner, explorer and navigator Captain Phillip Parker King, who added the front portico to the house (essentially completing the house in its current form). King's addition was in 1839. The house has not been (significantly) altered since that addition.

Stroud's early growth became stunted as the Australian economy became depressed in the 1840s and the company's prerogatives were reconsidered and focus shifted elsewhere. By the 1840s, the AACo sought to stem its ongoing financial expenditure and recoup capital. As early plans to use convict labour to work the company's land did not come to fruition, and much of the company's one million acres remained uncultivated as labour was scarce, the company turned its attention towards land sales to generate a new income.

Land sales were sporadic, largely due to the isolated nature of much of the company's land lying beyond existing colonial settlements (such was the case with the township of Stroud), but the AACo did leave Stroud and successfully refocus its operations towards cattle farming in the north. By the end of the 19th century, large-scale pastoralism had reached its conclusion but the restructured Australian Agricultural Company, despite years of struggle and disappointments, survived and today is one of Australia's oldest companies still in operation.

With the departure of the company, Stroud remained a small community town that continues to reflect the past influence of one of Australia's large-scale agricultural companies. Stroud House, used as a banking and later doctor's office, has remained a landmark building in the region. Today, Stroud House has been converted back to its original use as a dwelling and has returned to the hands of descendants of the AACo's commissioner from 1839 to 1849, Admiral Phillip Parker King, FRS, RN.

The family bought the property in 2003 from Stroud teacher, Rosemary Neville, who had spent 50 years there and was its longest private owner.

The listing of the house on the NSW State Heritage Register was announced by Upper Hunter MP Michael Johnsen in April, 2016.

== Description ==
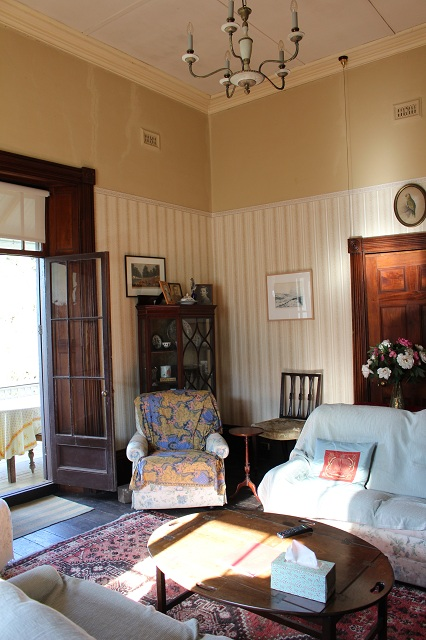
Stroud House interior

An 1832 refurbishment and extension of a once modest single-storey cottage (1827), Stroud House is a two-storey convict-built dwelling with attached servant's quarters. Set amongst half an acre of domestic landscaped gardens, Stroud House is a rendered and painted brick building with a corrugated iron roof (early slate roof tiles remain on the servant's quarters). The house has front and rear verandahs running its length, an entry portico, three dormer windows to the front elevation and three brick chimneys aligning with the early fireplaces retained within the house. The single-storey servant's quarters has two chimneys.

Internally, the house retains two of its reception rooms and is fitted with a series of bedrooms and living spaces. The house retains much of its early red cedar joinery (skirting boards and window and door architraves) and its only internal change since 1890 is the partial removal of one internal wall (most likely to accommodate its previous use as a commercial bank).

=== Condition ===
As at 10 July 2015, considering its age, Stroud House is in fair condition. The house has experienced shifts in its foundations over its lifetime which has resulted in noticeable level changes within the house. However, Stroud House is a solidly built structure and has accommodated these shifting conditions well.

Due perhaps to its small number of owners over its lifetime, Stroud House is a particularly intact convict-built residence dating from the late 1820s/30s. Stroud House retains its early layout, the only alteration from plans prepared in 1890 appears to be the partial removal of one internal wall (likely during the house's use as the Bank of Australasia).

The house retains much of its early red cedar joinery and floorboards. Fireplaces remain extant, original plaster ceilings are evident in most rooms and some features (including servants bell systems) remain in situ.

=== Modifications and dates ===
- 1827 - single storey cottage built by AACo (rudiments of Stroud House)
- 1833 - Captain Sir Edward Parry had cottage renovated and extended to accommodate family.
- 1839 - Director Admiral Phillip Parker King, RN had front portico added to house
- 1890 - likely some modification to accommodate Bank of Australasia
- 1931 - likely some modification to accommodate consulting rooms for local doctors
- 1945 - likely some modifications to reconvert Stroud House to a private residence
- 2004-14 - replacement of roof with corrugated iron sheeting; replacement of electrical system throughout house, house painting and general repairs and replacements.
- 2011 - ground drainage works and replacement of sections of termite-damaged verandah timbers.

== Heritage listing ==
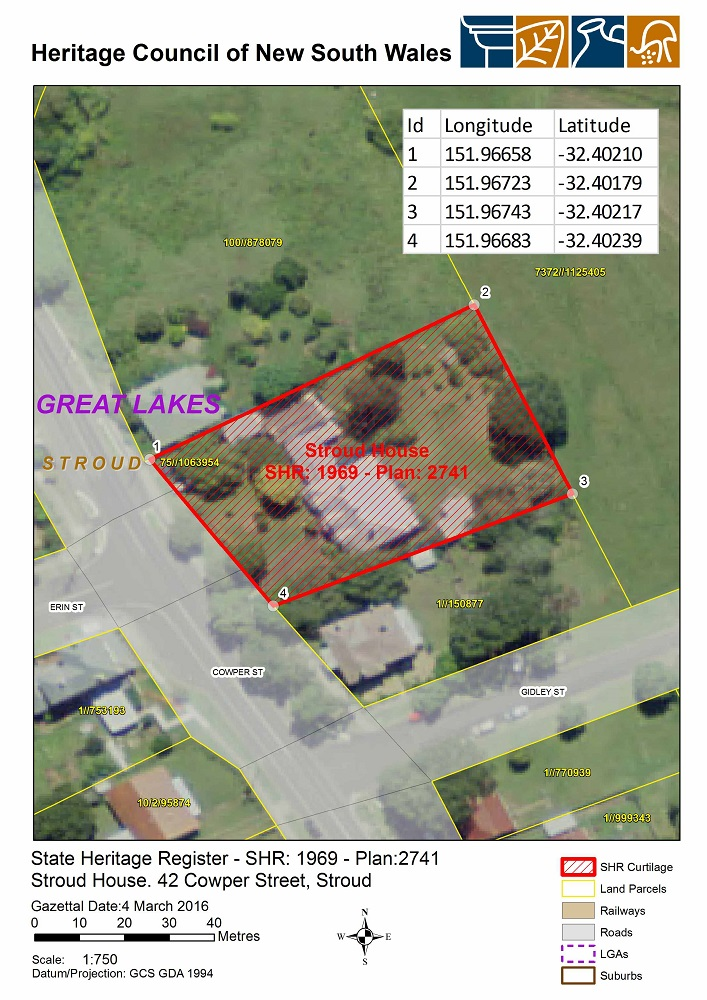
Heritage boundaries

Stroud House is of state heritage significance for its established links with the Australian Agricultural Company (AACo). Incorporated by an act of British Parliament in 1824, the AACo was the first large-scale agricultural company formed in Australia and, having been granted one million pounds and one million acres, it was the first major influx of private capital into the colony.

Stroud, the company's second company town and extensive farm, was established in 1827, the year following the selection and development of the company's headquarters at Carrington, Port Stephens. Stroud House was developed as a residence for the company's superintendents and notable guests and, dating from the early days of the company, Stroud House is an early remnant of the AACo and its development and operation of the Port Stephens Estate.

Stroud House is also of state heritage significance for its association with convict labour in the colony. Built by the company's convict labour force in 1827 and extensively modified in 1832, Stroud House is a rare surviving and largely intact early colonial building. Retaining much of its early layout and fabric, Stroud House has the potential to reveal further information about the domestic lifestyle of prominent colonists in NSW and the skills and techniques of the AACo's convict workforce.

Due to its high level of intactness, Stroud House is a particularly fine example of early colonial architecture and convict construction from an important historical phase in the regional and agricultural development of NSW.

Stroud House was listed on the New South Wales State Heritage Register on 4 March 2016 having satisfied the following criteria.

The place is important in demonstrating the course, or pattern, of cultural or natural history in New South Wales.

Stroud House is of state heritage significance for its established links with the Australian Agricultural Company (AACo). The first of Australia's large-scale agricultural companies, the AACo was incorporated by an act of British Parliament in 1824 and, having been granted one million pounds and one million acres, it was the first major influx of private capital into the colony.

Stroud, the company's second company town and extensive farm, was established in 1827, the year following the selection and development of the company's headquarters at Carrington, Port Stephens. Stroud House was developed as a residence for the company's superintendents and notable guests and, dating from the early days of the company, Stroud House is an early remnant of the AACo and its development and operation of the Port Stephens Estate. Developed by the company's convict labour force, Stroud House reflects an important historical phase in the regional and agricultural development of NSW.

The place has a strong or special association with a person, or group of persons, of importance of cultural or natural history of New South Wales's history.

Stroud House is of state heritage significance for its association with the Australian Agricultural Company (AACo). Incorporated by an act of British Parliament in 1824, the AACo was the first large-scale agricultural company formed in Australia and, having been granted one million pounds and one million acres, it was the first major influx of private capital into the colony. When Stroud was established as an extensive farm and company town in the late-1820s, Stroud House was constructed for use by the company's superintendents and notable guests.

Stroud House is also of state heritage significance for its association with the convict labour force of the AACo. Built by the company's convict workforce in 1827 and extensively modified in 1832, Stroud House was constructed under the direction of free settler Thomas Laman (who oversaw a number of convict constructions for the AACo on the Port Stephens Estate, including St Johns Anglican Church, Stroud).

The place is important in demonstrating aesthetic characteristics and/or a high degree of creative or technical achievement in New South Wales.

Unlike other constructions of the Australian Agricultural Company (AACo), Stroud House is an extensively sized and elaborate dwelling that reflects the prominence and status of the AACo superintendents and notable guests that occupied the house during its association with the company throughout the 19th century.

Originally a modest single storey cottage (1827), Stroud House was extensively modified in 1832 using the company's convict labour force. The condition and intactness of Stroud House lends it to be one of the better examples of colonial architecture in NSW today.

The place has strong or special association with a particular community or cultural group in New South Wales for social, cultural or spiritual reasons.

With a long-held use as a private residence, the social significance of Stroud House is limited.

However, the house is widely recognised as a landmark in the area and an early colonial property associated with the Australian Agricultural Company. Thus, Stroud House does have some social significance for the greater Stroud district and the former Port Stephens Estate.

The place has potential to yield information that will contribute to an understanding of the cultural or natural history of New South Wales.

Stroud House is of state heritage significance for its potential to reveal further information about the domestic lifestyle of prominent colonists in NSW. Due to its intactness, Stroud House can demonstrate the domestic living standards and styles of the superintendents and leaders of the Australian Agricultural Company (AACo) from the early 19th century. The construction and fabric of Stroud House can also provide information about the techniques and skills of the convict labour force in NSW during times of colonial expansion and settlement.

The place possesses uncommon, rare or endangered aspects of the cultural or natural history of New South Wales.

The retention of intact early colonial architecture, such as Stroud House, is important to our understanding of Australia's colonial period. However, survival of these types of properties is not necessarily rare in NSW.

Originally dating from 1827 and extensively modified to its current form in 1832, Stroud House retains much of its early layout and fabric (including convict-made bricks and joinery).

The place is important in demonstrating the principal characteristics of a class of cultural or natural places/environments in New South Wales.

Stroud House is of state heritage significance as a fine representative example of early colonial architecture in NSW. Due to its high level of intactness, Stroud House is a particularly fine example of early colonial architecture that can demonstrate the domestic lifestyle and tastes of prominent British colonists in NSW.

Stroud House is also of state heritage significance as a fine representative example of a convict-built dwelling from the colonial period of the 1830s. The intactness of Stroud House lends it to be one of the better examples of colonial architecture in NSW today.
