= St John the Evangelist Anglican Church, Stroud =

St John the Evangelist Anglican Church
- St John's Anglican Church
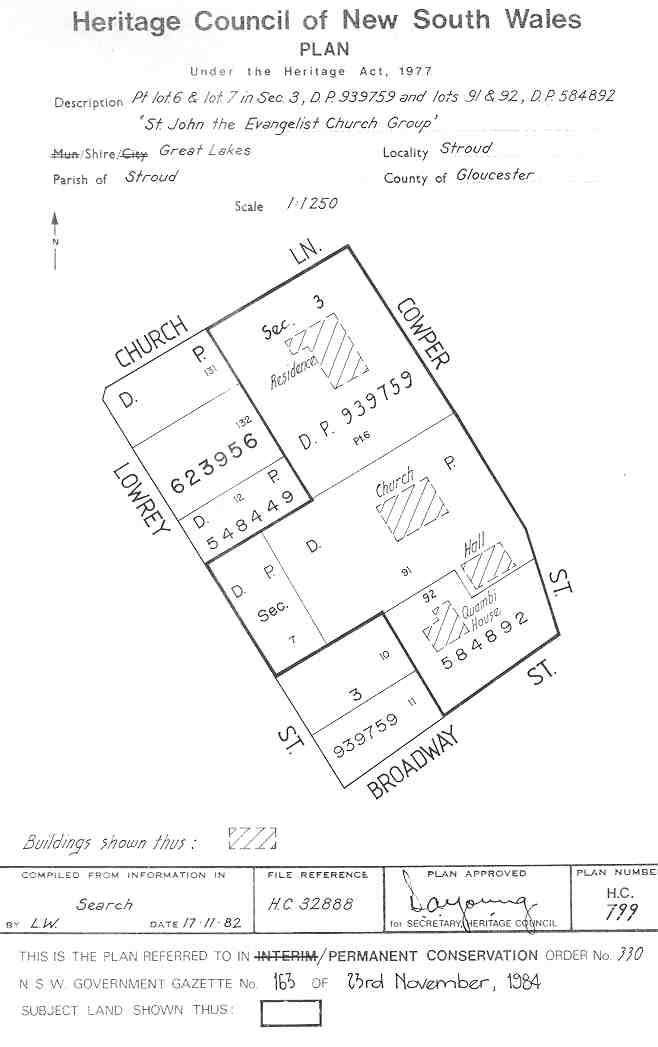
- Heritage boundaries

- Location in New South Wales
- 32°24′19″S 151°58′03″E
- Location: Cowper Street, Stroud, Mid-Coast Council, New South Wales
- Country: Australia
- Denomination: Anglican
- Website: newcastleanglican.org.au/your-church/stroud/

History
- Status: Church
- Founded: 1833
- Founder: Sir William Parry
- Dedication: Saint John the Evangelist

Architecture
- Functional status: Active
- Architectural type: Church
- Style: Old Colonial Gothik
- Years built: 1833

Administration
- Province: New South Wales
- Diocese: Newcastle
- Parish: St John the Evangelist, Stroud

New South Wales Heritage Register
- Official name: St. John the Evangelist Anglican Church Group; St John's Anglican Church; Quambi; Saint John the Evangelist
- Type: State heritage (complex / group)
- Designated: 2 April 1999
- Reference no.: 330
- Type: Church
- Category: Religion
- Builders: Convict labour

St John the Evangelist Anglican Church, also known as St John's Anglican Church, is a heritage-listed Anglican church at Cowper Street, Stroud, Mid-Coast Council, New South Wales, Australia. It was added to the New South Wales State Heritage Register on 2 April 1999.

== History ==
The church was built in 1833, having been funded by Sir William Parry, the Commissioner of the Australian Agricultural Company and built by convict labour with construction supervised by the company's chief carpenter, Thomas Laman. The village of Stroud had been established by the company as part of a million-acre grant in the region it had received for its farming operations. A Congregationalist company chaplain, Charles Price, was initially in charge of the church, before William Cowper became the first Anglican rector in 1836. The company passed ownership of the church to the Anglican Church in 1853.

== Description ==
The Church is a finely crafted and subdued example of early architecture that predates the influence of ecclesiology. Its design, although subdued reflects the religious philosophy of Parry and the governments attitude to Church construction at that time. Incredibly, few changes have been made to the building, and it remains to this day, essentially as it was designed and constructed in 1833.

Built in 1833 by Thomas Laman in the Old Colonial Gothik style, the church has an unscholarly application of medieval motifs upon a simple classical form, built in a traditional manner with construction techniques and materials typical of its period.

Externally the Church presents a simple yet eloquent façade. A small square bellcote on the ridge of the gabled roof marks the western façade. A centrally placed porch on the southern side and a vestry on the north have the effect of making the building symmetrical on its east and west axis. Both eastern and western facades originally contained gothic arched lancet windows with wooden Y tracery and a little quatrefoil cut into the space at the top of the Y. These simple pointed lancet windows are still symmetrically arranged on the facades. However, the most eastern windows on the northern and southern facades have since been replaced with new designs and stained glass as memorial windows.

The original furnishings of the interior are still in use to this day and are surprisingly still in good order for their age. Internally, the plaster barrel vault ceiling is crowned with a simple cornice with fluorescent lights concealed above the wooden architraves. The gallery located at the western end of the building and intended as a memorial pew is approached by steps from the nave and has rods for curtains. Balancing pulpits flank the semicircular-railed sanctuary against the eastern wall.

The internal joinery and fittings are of waxed local cedar, including the altar and seating in the form of benches with decorative shaped backs. The brick walls are plastered intern and in good condition. The doors are of uncommon design, yet all consist of six panels and many still have their original latches.

=== Condition ===
The condition of the built church is in very good physical condition due to its restoration in the early 1980s. However, some brickwork is deteriorating due to rising damp. Roof gutters, downpipes and drainage lines are in good condition and dispose of stormwater adequately.

The fine cedar joinery appears in excellent condition and the stained glass windows are in good order, although some of the more recent repairs to the windows could be considered inappropriate in that they obscure some of the glass.

Access to the roof was not gained and this should be inspected to ensure the structure is in a stable condition and no pest attack is occurring. The slate roof appears to suffer water ingress as a result of inadequate lap of the original slate installation. It is apparent that this problem is gradually worsening as slates slip and fixings fail, and there is immediate potential for water damage to interior fixtures and finishes, in particular the existing ceiling, if this problem is not immediately remediated. It is anticipated that relaying of the slates and rebedding and pointing of the ridge capping will be required to rectify this problem.

The effect of rising damp and deterioration of the brick surfaces near ground level should be regularly monitored over the next 12 months to establish whether the deterioration si continuing or whether it was halted by the 1983 restoration.

== Heritage listing ==
The St John the Evangelist Church, Parsonage and Parish Hall form a highly significant group in every sense of the word. Historically, it is significant for its links to A.A. Co. and Sir William and Lady Parry, and subsequent A. A. Company Commissioners. The role of the Parish Hall as a school provides links to early education systems in New South Wales. The Church has been credited as being "perhaps the finest and certainly the most intact Anglican Church in Australia which predates the influence of ecclesiology".

Together, the group forms an aesthetically significant group of Colonial Georgian Buildings which remain virtually unaltered since construction. Socially, the group continues to remain a focus of religious and community life in Stroud, a role served by each building from its moment of completion.

St John the Evangelist Anglican Church was listed on the New South Wales State Heritage Register on 2 April 1999 having satisfied the following criteria.

The place is important in demonstrating the course, or pattern, of cultural or natural history in New South Wales.

The St Johns group of buildings in Stroud is historically significant for its close associations to the Australian Agricultural Company and its place in the establishment of the town of Stroud. The group remain an integral and undiminished assembly of buildings, which in their context reveal an important historical phase in the pattern of development in New South Wales.

Stroud was established by the Australian Agricultural Company on its one million acre grant in the Port Stephens area. Dating from the earliest days of settlement in the Port Stephens are, this unique group of buildings were an early part of the Australian Agricultural Company's rural empire. The buildings are remnants from the early settlement of the town by the AA Company.

The buildings were built during the convict period and there is no doubt that the A. A. Company had a large contingent of convicts working on their Port Stephens property (of which Stroud was a part) and therefore it is most likely that there was convict labour used in the construction. However, there is no historical evidence to prove this. Although the poor construction of the Western door of the church may suggest unskilled convict labour was used in its construction.

The Buildings including the cemetery and surrounding landscape provide a tangible record of the local district history over more than a century. There continuing social value for the contemporary community is reflected both in the support and attention the community has for this site. The cemetery expresses, via its memorials, the major phases in the district's history, in particular the success of pastoral activity. The cemetery has been valued over time by the local community for its memorials, associations and, by the state of its present maintenance, is valued still as one of the important links with the early formation of the Australian Agricultural Company.

The buildings and landscape are a reflection of the continuity and development of Anglican worship in the Stroud district. The church is the oldest operational church in NSW. The precinct has been a strong focus for the religious community since the early nineteenth century and retains a high level of social significance for the parishioners. The Church group contributes more broadly to the historical precinct of Stroud.

The St Johns group is therefore significant at a State level for the process of growth and development they represent in relation to the A.A Company as a reminder of the most important agricultural activities in Australia's early history, the township of Stroud; and the Anglican religion.

The place has a strong or special association with a person, or group of persons, of importance of cultural or natural history of New South Wales's history.

St Johns Stroud Group holds significant importance for its association with the Australian Agricultural Company, and it Super Intendants, especially that of Parry.

Sir W. E. Parry before serving as a commissioner at Port Stephens from 1829 to 1834 was a former Royal Navy Hydrographer and acclaimed Arctic explorer Captain held in high regard for his contribution to the development of Stroud and in particular the development of religious worship within the community. Parry was one of the more significant figures in early Australian history.

The site is locally significant for the association with the clergy and the priests and pastors that have served there. Furthermore, there is an important link between the Anglican community and Church of England.

The place is important in demonstrating aesthetic characteristics and/or a high degree of creative or technical achievement in New South Wales.

The St. John's Group of buildings, Stroud has a very high degree of aesthetic appeal. They are a distinctive and attractive group of Colonial Georgian sandstock brick buildings, dating from 1830. They are representative of the colonial character and the style of buildings constructed at that time.

Together the buildings form a cohesive group of Colonial Georgian buildings that are aesthetically significant, remaining virtually unaltered since their construction. The decorative detail of the church furnishings are significant for their creative styling and design. Furthermore, they are still in use today and in good working condition.

The barrel vaulted elliptical church roof is technically interesting for its period.

While the vast majority of cemetery monuments remain in relatively good condition today, there are some headstones which have not been replaced after either being vandalised or simply deteriorated from age. However, they demonstrate a remarkable range of high quality workmanship and skilled installation techniques. These fine examples of craftsmanship are enhanced by the use of sandstone and occasional white marble and the setting of the cemetery.

The cultural plantings and garden beds associated with the rectory are somewhat earlier developments. However, they have incorporated some early plant material and now play a significant role in the aesthetics of the St John's group.

The setting and surrounding landscape of Stroud has been virtually undeveloped and as such retains much of its original beauty.

In terms of architectural characteristics, the St Johns group of buildings, landscapes and cemetery stands on its own merits as having aesthetic significance at a state level.

The place has strong or special association with a particular community or cultural group in New South Wales for social, cultural or spiritual reasons.

From the beginning of European settlement in New South Wales, the role of the Church of England was closely tied to the interests of the state. Consequently, organised religion held an important place in early settlement of Stroud, being nurtured, if not perhaps enforced by the Australian Agricultural Company Superintendents. Therefore, religious worship has been an important element of the social fabric of Stroud, since its development.

St John's Stroud Group stands as a reminder both of the churches role in convict society and of Parry's commitment to evangelicalism. St John's Stroud group is of spiritual significance to the evangelical community. The group of building's have contributed to the spiritual and cultural life of the Stroud community for over 170 years, serving as the centre of local Anglican worship and social activity.

Stroud has seen the rise and decline of many local community groups typical of rural towns. The St John's Church Hall has played a pivotal role in providing a place for community groups since it was built until this day.

The Buildings including the cemetery and surrounding landscape provide a tangible record of the local history over more than a century. In particular, the cemetery expresses, via its monuments, the major phases in the districts history, in particular the success of pastoral activity.

The place has potential to yield information that will contribute to an understanding of the cultural or natural history of New South Wales.

The Buildings including the cemetery and surrounding landscape provide a tangible record of the local district history over more than a century. These buildings are the oldest of their type still in use and therefore have some potential to reveal information that will contribute both to the cultural and natural history of NSW and more significantly the local history of Stroud.

These buildings have formed an integral part of the tangible history of the Stroud community, for over 170 years including its built fabric, social, cultural and spiritual development. The linkages with Australian Agricultural Company provide information about early settlement, the social structures and furthermore the development of NSW.

The significant fabric of the buildings and landscape has the potential to reveal information about the type and style of construction techniques of the 1800s. For example, the originality of design and furnishings within the Church reflect the type of building construction and design of their period.

In terms of archaeological potential, the St John's cemetery with inscriptions, dating from 1836 has the potential to reveal information of the hardships of life in an early colonial village. Being a small rural cemetery with a good range of monumental styles spanning two centuries, this site reveals the style and type of burials undertaken in the early and late 19th Century.

The place possesses uncommon, rare or endangered aspects of the cultural or natural history of New South Wales.

By virtue of their age and condition the St John's Group has the potential to reveal historical information about early settlement in NSW. In particular, the Church reflects the governments attitude to Church construction at that time.

Finally, the buildings have an interesting history that is interwoven with the history of the Australian Agricultural Company. Examination of that history gives a unique insight into the minds of those who first settled NSW. In particular the concepts of religious worship and its important place in the early communities of NSW.

The place is important in demonstrating the principal characteristics of a class of cultural or natural places/environments in New South Wales.

St John's Stroud group is a considerably significant heritage item that is representative of the relationship between the buildings in terms of Church- School- Parsonage. Even despite the fact that this relationship is common place, Stroud group is an original example of that relationship where many other of its type may have been destroyed or altered by progress over time.

Representative of the Church's role in early settlement and in particular in the convict society and of Parry's commitment to evangelicalism.

The group as part of the township of Stroud provides evidence of early town layouts, where the street grid is arranged around earlier ad hoc developments, and where it as predominantly in the hands of a single entity - the Australian Agricultural Company.

== See also ==
- List of Anglican churches in New South Wales
- Australian non-residential architectural styles
