= Williams River (New South Wales) =

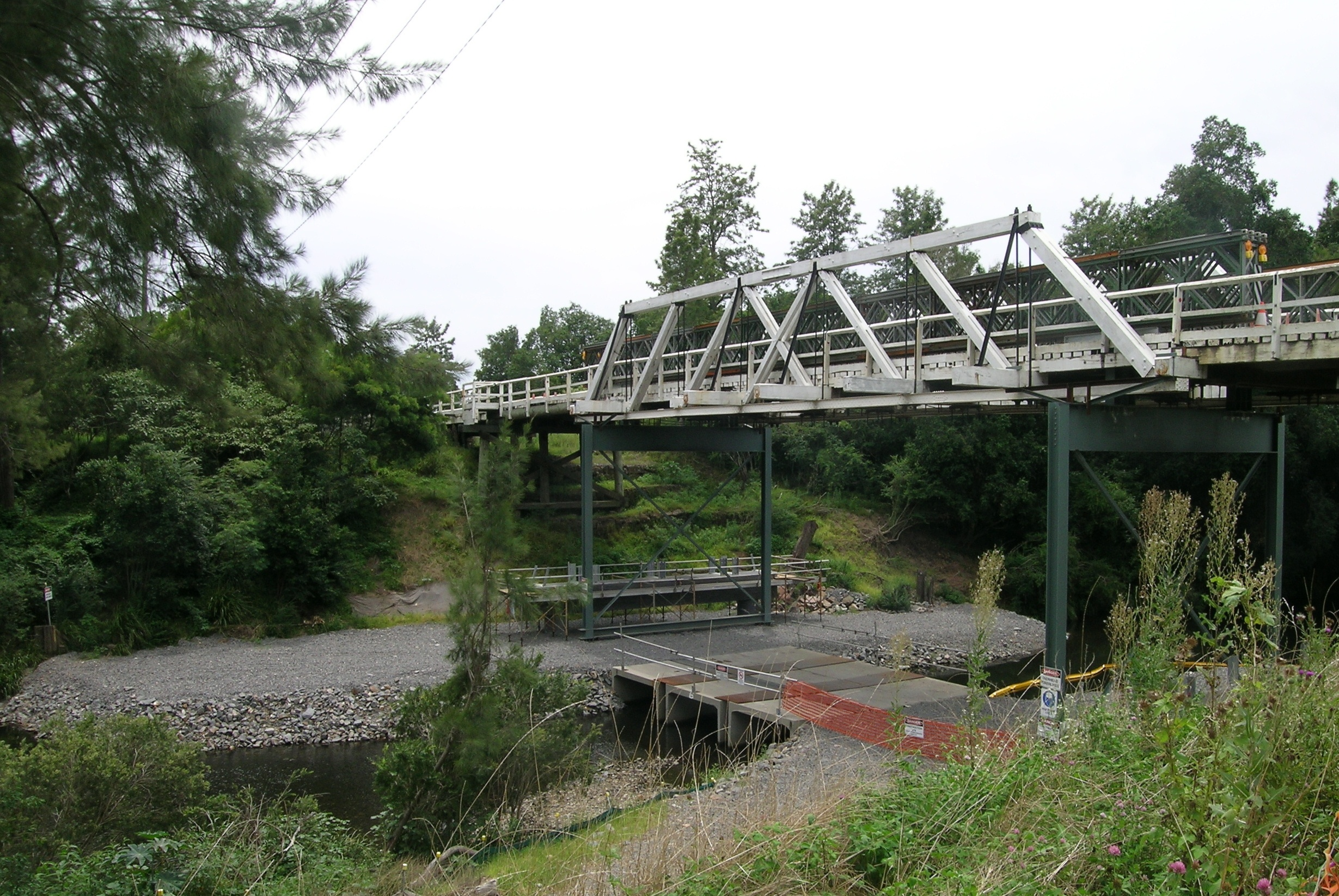
- The Williams River at Dungog

Location
- Country: Australia
- State: New South Wales
- Region: NSW North Coast (IBRA), Hunter Region, Mid North Coast
- Local government areas: Dungog Shire, Upper Hunter Shire, Port Stephens
- Towns: Raymond Terrace, Seaham, Clarence Town, Dungog

Physical characteristics
- Source: Careys Peak, Barrington Tops
  - location: near Salisbury
  - coordinates: 32°3′7″S 151°28′43.4″E
  - elevation: 747 m (2,451 ft)
- Mouth: confluence with Hunter River
  - location: Raymond Terrace, Hunter Region
  - coordinates: 32°45′S 151°45′E
  - elevation: 1 m (3 ft 3 in)
- Length: 142 km (88 mi)

Basin features
- River system: Hunter River catchment
- Tributaries
  - left: Chichester River, Carowiry Creek, Black Camp Creek
  - right: Myall Creek (New South Wales), Tabbil Creek, Wallarobba Creek, Unwarrabin Creek, Chambers Creek (New South Wales), Tumbledown Creek, Stony Creek (New South Wales)
- Bridges: Cooreei Bridge, Dungog; Clarence Town bridge
- National park: Barrington Tops NP

The Williams River is a perennial stream that is a tributary of the Hunter River, in the Hunter Region of New South Wales, Australia.

== Course and features ==
The Williams River rises on the southern slopes of the Barrington Tops below Careys Peak within Barrington Tops National Park, and flows generally southeast and south, joined by ten tributaries including Chichester River, before reaching its confluence with the Hunter River at Raymond Terrace. The river descends 749 metres (2,457 ft) over its 142 kilometres (88 mi) course; through Dungog, Clarence Town and Seaham.

At Clarence Town, the Williams River is crossed by the Clarence Town bridge that carries Limeburners Creek Road; and in Dungog, the river is crossed by the Cooreei Bridge that carries Stroud Hill Road. Both bridges are listed on the New South Wales State Heritage Register.

== Colonial history and frontier conflict ==
Prior to British colonisation, the Williams River valley was inhabited by Aboriginal Australian peoples, including groups associated with the Gringai. European pastoral expansion during the nineteenth century led to territorial displacement and violent conflict between settlers and local Indigenous communities.

According to a later account published in 1922, settlers in the Williams Valley surrounded a Gringai camp in 1835 and forced its inhabitants over a cliff. A number of survivors were reportedly pursued and killed near the Bowman River. The report stated that human remains were visible in the area for many years afterward.

Historians have identified such incidents as part of the broader Australian frontier wars, a series of conflicts associated with British colonial expansion across Australia. Some historical studies argue that colonial authorities frequently failed to effectively investigate violence committed against Aboriginal communities during this period.

== See also ==
- Grahamstown Dam
- List of rivers of Australia

== Gallery ==
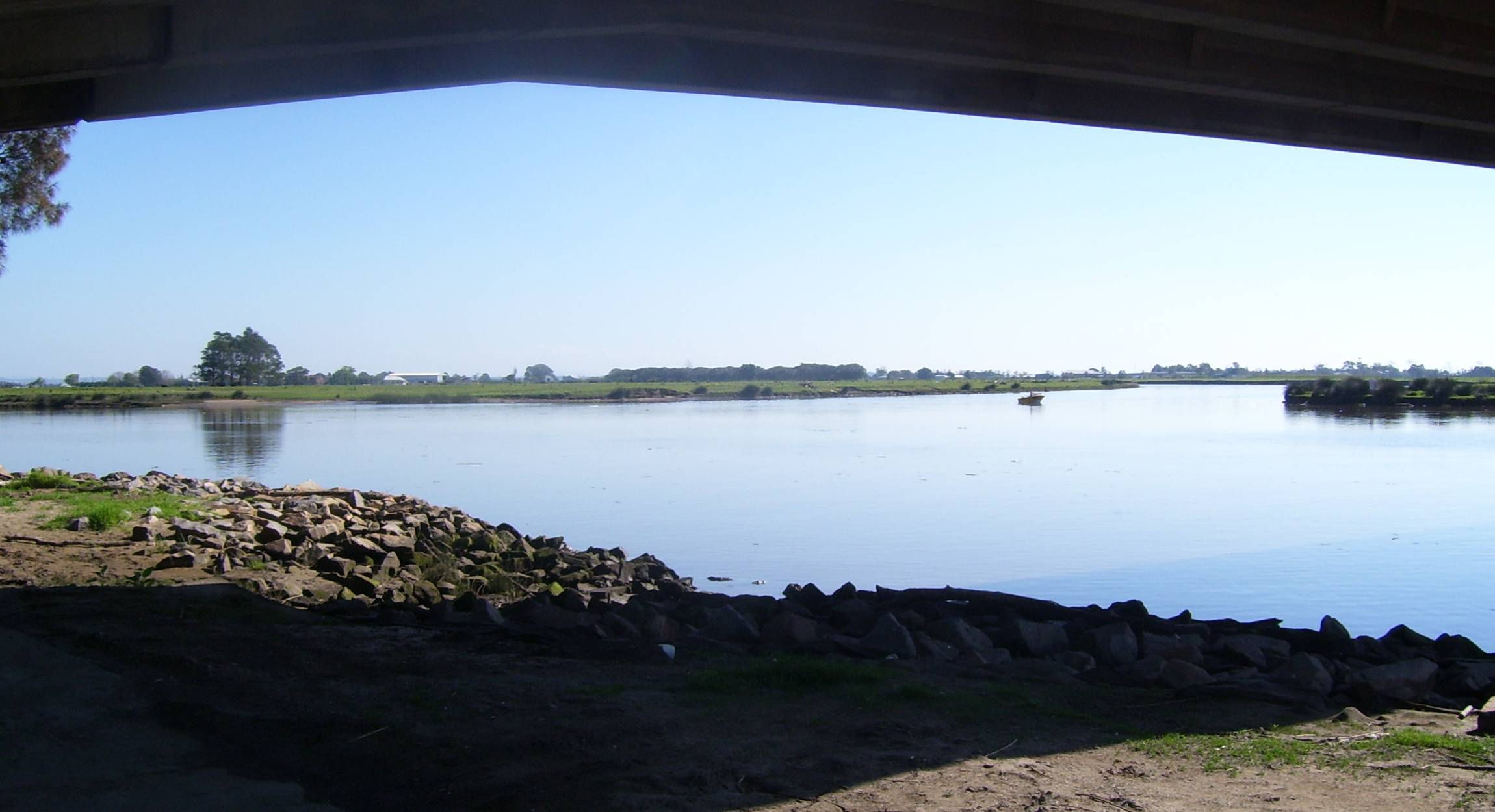
Confluence of the Hunter and Williams rivers.
