= Monkerai, New South Wales =

Coordinates: 32°15′13″S 151°51′30″E

Monkerai is a large rural area in the hills in the land between Dungog and Gloucester in Mid-Coast Council, in the Hunter Region, New South Wales, Australia.

Monkerai was traditionally timber and dairy country but in subsequent years has become grazing country. In 1981 the Tanelorn Music Festival was held on the property "Riverwood Downs" at Monkerai hosting 30,000 patrons. Riverwood Downs Mountain Valley Resort is now a major tourist resort and is the largest employer in the area.

Monkerai is in the foothills of World Heritage Barrington Tops and is surrounded by state forests and national parks, including the Black Bulga State Conservation Area. It boasts the following attractions - a public hall and a historic bridge.

== Heritage listings ==
Monkerai has a number of heritage-listed sites, including:

- 101 Main Road: Monkerai Bridge over Karuah River

== Historical records of Monkerai ==
The Greville's Post Office Directory of 1872 lists the following details for Monkerai

"Distance 142 miles North of Sydney.
Mail closes at General Post Office Monday 5.30 p.m.
Mail arrives at Post Town Wednesday 5 p.m.
Mail leaves for Sydney Wednesday 10.30 a.m
Mail arrives at Sydney Saturday evenings.
Route Steamer to Raymond Terrace, coach Stroud, 15m. Monkerai; or via steamer
Clarence Town, 18m. Monkerai."

SURNAME	CHRISTIAN	OCCUPATION	ADDRESS
BARKWILL	William	farmer	Monkerai
BUGG	James	farmer	Monkerai
COWAN	Colin	farmer	Monkerai
COWAN	Donald	farmer	Monkerai
FORBES	William	farmer	Monkerai
FROST	James	grazier	Monkerai
GRANT	Robert	farmer	Monkerai
HIGGINS	Peter	farmer	Monkerai
MINNES	Roderick	farmer	Monkerai
MRAE	Donald	farmer	Monkerai
MRAE	Elizabeth	farmer	Monkerai
MRAE	Malcolm	farmer	Monkerai
MARTIN	John	farmer	Monkerai
MARTIN	Richard	sawyer	Monkerai
MARTIN	William	farmer	Monkerai
MOORE	Edward	farmer	Monkerai
MOORE	John	labourer	Monkerai
MOORE	William	farmer	Monkerai
MOSS	Miles	teacher	Monkerai
MUDDLE	John	labourer	Monkerai
RELTON	James	farmer	Monkerai
TITCUME	George	farmer	Monkerai
TITCUME	William	farmer	Monkerai
TOMS	John	farmer	Monkerai
WILKINSON	James	farmer	Monkerai

The list shows 26 individuals or families residing officially in Monkerai in 1872.
There is a Moores Rd and Moores Creek in Monkerai, which may be connected to the Edward, John or William Moore listed.

The James Bugg listed is the father of Mary Ann Bugg who lived occasionally in the area and is mostly known for her time spent as a bushranger and her relationship with Captain Thunderbolt.
