= Alexander Riley (merchant) =

Merchant

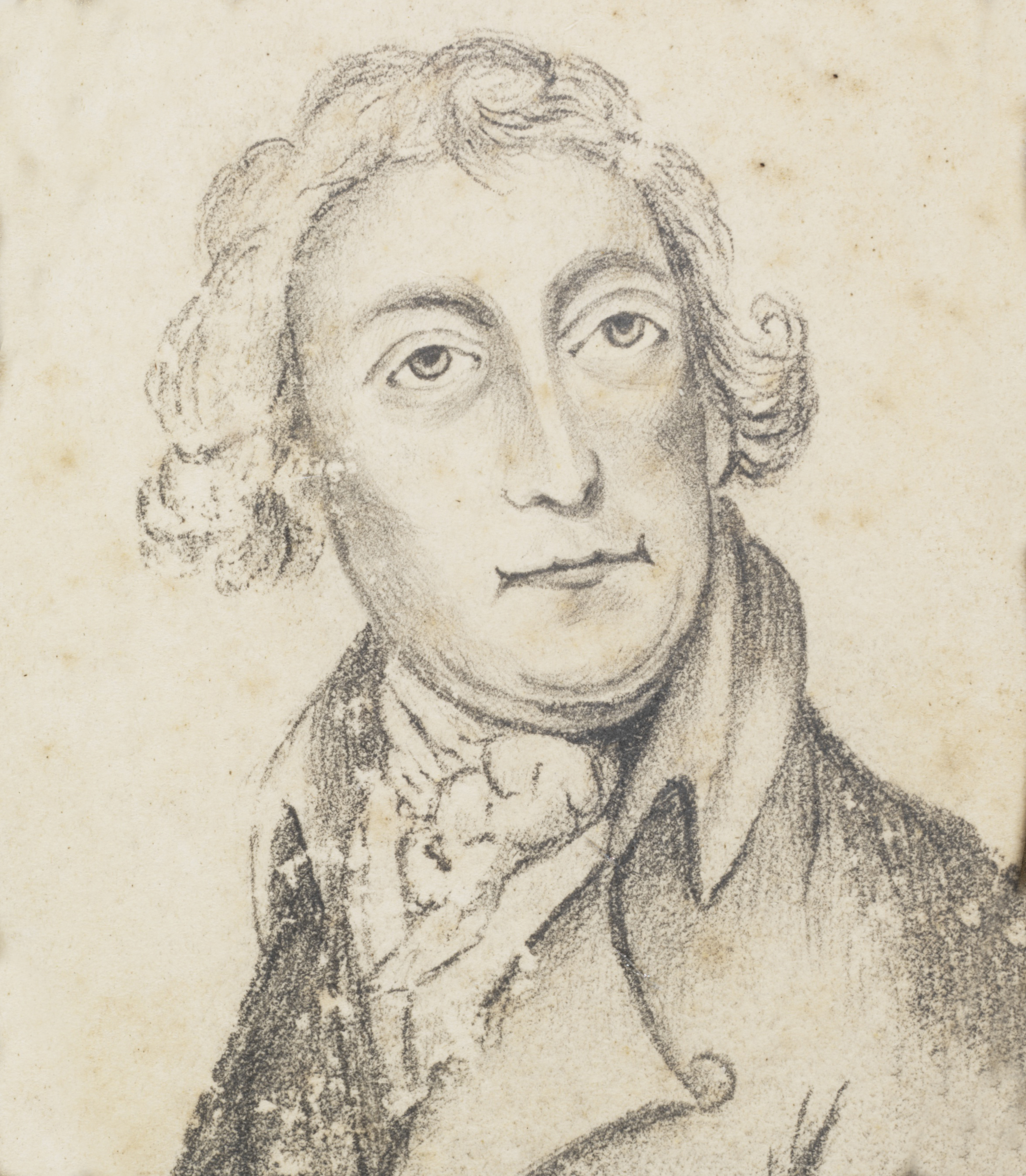
- Portrait of Alexander Riley, 1811
- Born: 1778; Middlesex, England
- Died: 17 November 1833 (aged 54–55); London, England
- Occupations: Merchant, pastoralist

Alexander Riley (1778 – 17 November 1833) was a merchant and one of the most important early pastoralists in Sydney and in New South Wales. Born in London to George Riley Snr, a well-educated bookseller, and Margaret Raby, he was the older brother of Edward Riley, also a merchant and pastoralist in Sydney. In 1804 Riley followed two of his sisters, who had married captains in the New South Wales Corps, Captain Ralph Wilson and Anthony Fenn Kemp, to Australia where, with his brother Edward who later followed, they went on to become two of Australia's richest men.

== Life ==
Alexander Riley was born in Middlesex, London in 1778. Riley was the second oldest with two brothers, Edward Riley and Charles Riley, and three sisters, Frances, Margaret and Elizabeth. He Married Sophia Hardwicke in London on 30 October 1804, then left England in the Experiment arriving in Australia in June 1805. It was here that Lieutenant Governor Patterson looked upon Riley favourably and granted him generous land grants in the Liverpool area.

Riley acquired a farm at the Hawkesbury in August 1805 then became storekeeper and magistrate for Port Dalrymple, where his two sisters lived with their families. Later that year Riley was appointed deputy-commissary which enabled him to grasp the possibilities of international trading. Riley travelled to the colony of Sydney in January 1809 with Patterson, after Patterson assumed command of New South Wales after William Bligh was stood down. It was here that Riley became devoted to his land grant at Liverpool, named Raby, after his mother's family, and his love of sheep began.

== Other careers ==
Riley took on many careers for which he gained his wealth. Riley was known for his role in the international trading firm Jones & Riley, with Richard Jones, which conducted an import-export business between Calcutta and Canton. Jones & Riley continued until the 1820s. He developed a trading relationship with his brother Edward Riley, who lived in Calcutta, India, at the time as well as W.S.Davidson in Canton. He was one of the founders for the Bank of New South Wales in 1816, now Westpac, as well as the first marine insurance broker in New South Wales. Riley is named as part owner of two ships that made 7 whaling voyages between 1820 and 1824 presumably under the management of his brother or Richard Jones.

In 1817 Riley left the business Jones & Riley and all his other commercial affairs in the hands of his brother Edward, who had moved to New South Wales around 1915. Riley bought the Harriet and on 22 December 1817, sailed with his family, back to London. It is believed that the reason for his move was frustration with the East India Company's monopoly over international trading. Back in London he operated a mercantile firm. It is believed Riley never returned to Australia, however he did continue to have dealings with New South Wales.

In 1819 Riley joined the successful and highly respected firm Donaldson, Wilkinson & Co who were agents for the colonial trade.

In August 1825, with the help of his brother Edward and nephew Edward Jr (b1806), Riley exported the first of many flocks of Saxon merino sheep to Australia in the Sir George Osborne. Travelling with the sheep was his nephew Edward Jr who was supposed to hand the sheep over to his father Edward, however due to his father's recent death the sheep remained in the care of Edward Jr. These laid the foundations Australia's wool economy, the backbone of Australia's prosperity for the next century. Later Riley was granted one of the first pastoral runs in the Yass-Canberra area.

Riley died in London on 17 November 1833.
