= Telegherry River =

Telegherry River Right Hand Branch Karuah River
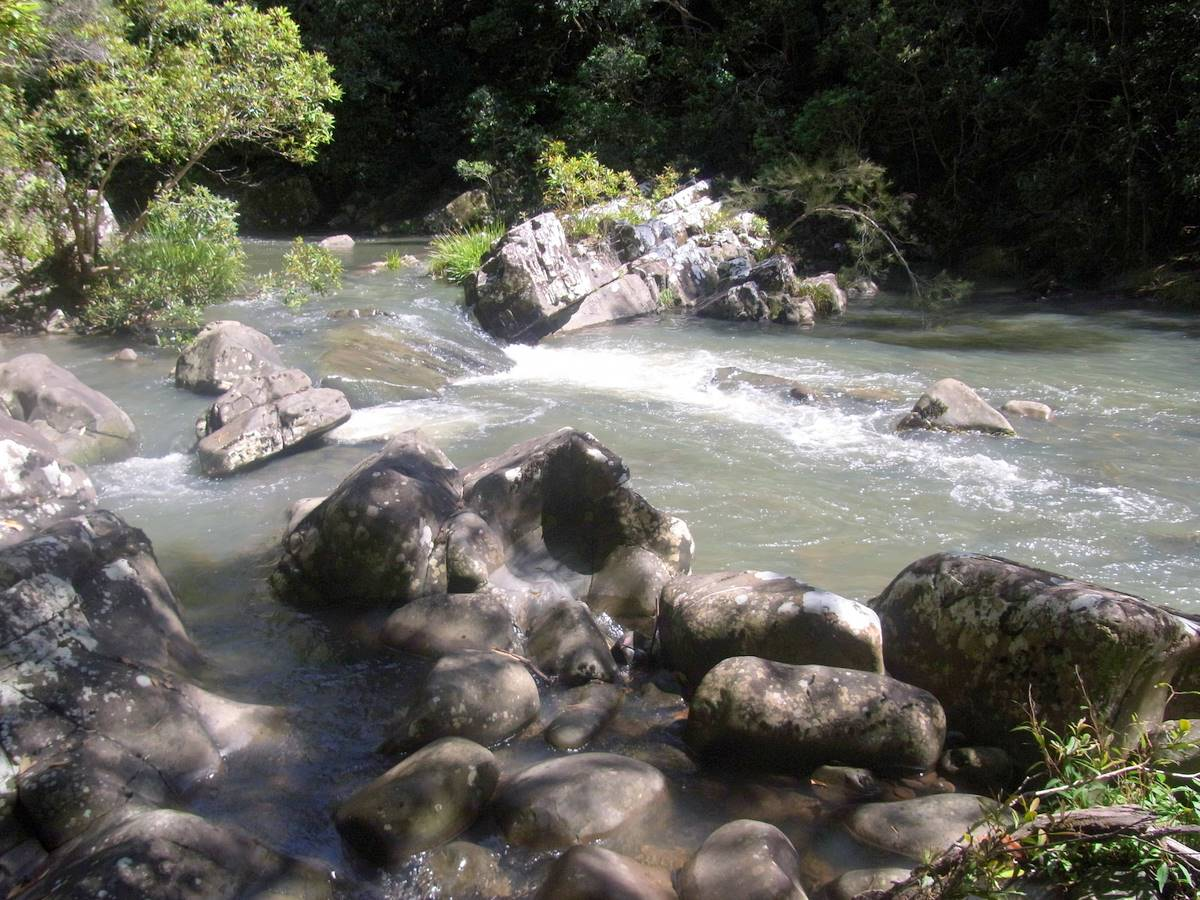

Location
- Country: Australia
- State: New South Wales
- Region: NSW North Coast (IBRA), Mid North Coast, Upper Hunter
- Local government area: Mid-Coast Council

Physical characteristics
- Source: Williams Range, Great Dividing Range
  - location: Below The Mountaineer, southwest of Gloucester
  - elevation: 929 m (3,048 ft)
- Mouth: Confluence with the Karuah River
  - location: North of Dungog
  - coordinates: 32°12′55″S 151°48′42″E
  - elevation: 157 m (515 ft)
- Length: 28 km (17 mi)

Basin features
- River system: Mid-Coast Council

Telegherry River, a perennial river of the Mid-Coast Council system, is located in the Mid North Coast and Upper Hunter regions of New South Wales, Australia.

== Course and features ==
Telegherry River rises on the southeastern slopes of the Williams Range within the Great Dividing Range, below The Mountaineer, southwest of Gloucester, and flows generally south southeast and east, before reaching its confluence with the Karuah River north of Dungog. The river descends 771 metres (2,530 ft) over its 28 kilometres (17 mi) course.

== See also ==
- Rivers of New South Wales
- List of rivers of New South Wales (L–Z)
- List of rivers of Australia
