= Williams River bridge, Clarence Town =

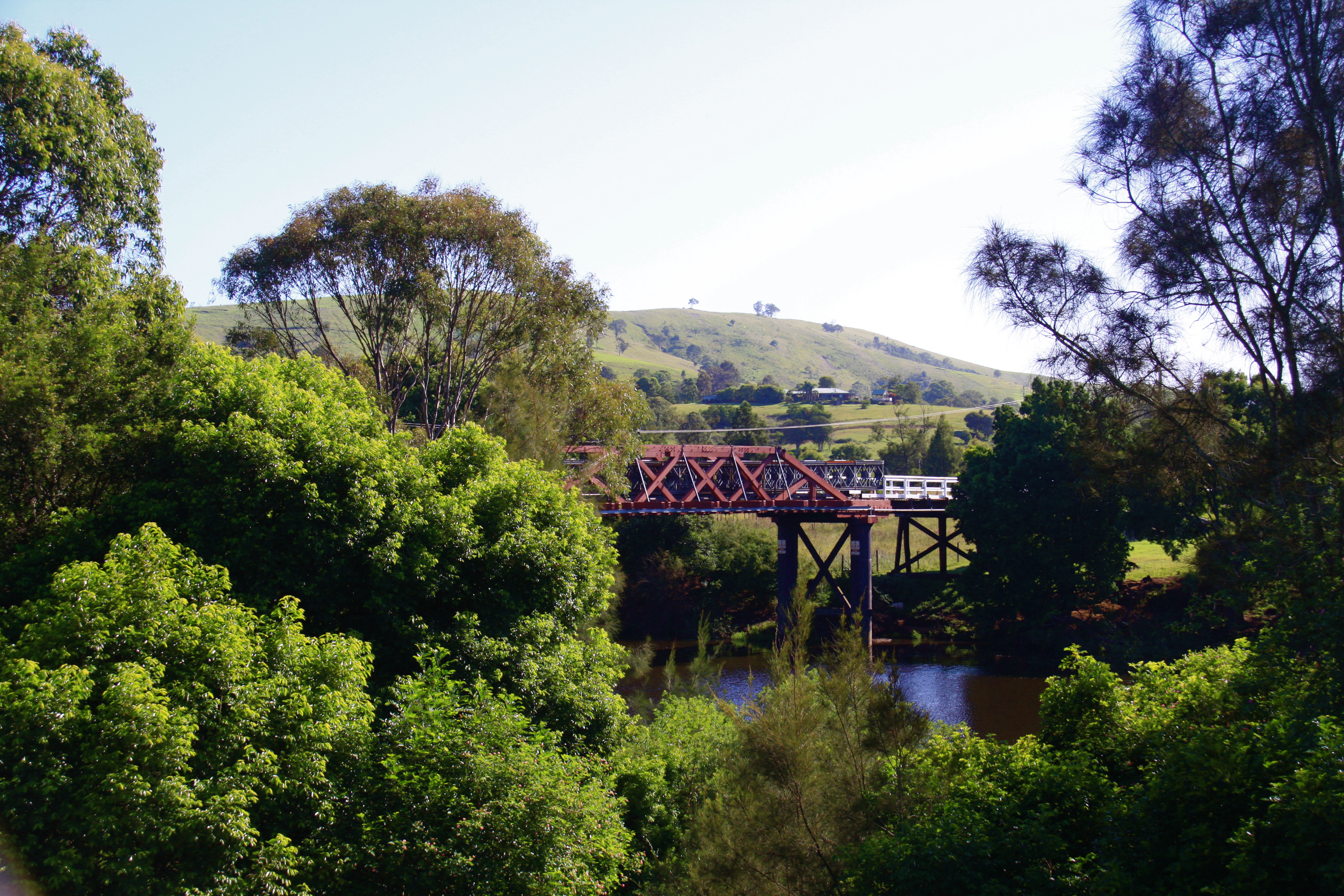
- Clarence Town Bridge
- Coordinates: 32°34′51″S 151°46′56″E
- Carries: Limeburners Creek Road
- Crosses: Williams River
- Locale: Clarence Town, New South Wales, Australia
- Owner: Transport for NSW

Characteristics
- Design: Truss bridge
- Material: Timber
- Pier construction: Cast iron cylinders
- Total length: 116 metres (380 ft)
- Width: 4.6 metres (15 ft)
- Longest span: 30 metres (100 ft)
- No. of spans: 2

History
- Contracted lead designer: NSW Public Works Department
- Constructed by: J. K. McKenzie
- Construction start: April 1879
- Inaugurated: 24 May 1880 by the wife of William Johnston
- Rebuilt: October 1926
- Replaces: Local ford

New South Wales Heritage Register
- Official name: Clarence Town Bridge over Williams River; Williams River bridge, Clarence Town
- Type: State heritage (built)
- Designated: 20 June 2000
- Reference no.: 1462
- Type: Road Bridge
- Category: Transport - Land
- Builders: J. K. McKenzie

The Williams River bridge, Clarence Town is a heritage-listed road bridge that carries Limeburners Creek Road across the Williams River located in Clarence Town, New South Wales, Australia. It was designed by the New South Wales Public Works Department and built by J. K. McKenzie. The property is owned by Transport for NSW. It was added to the New South Wales State Heritage Register on 20 June 2000.

== History ==
=== Timber truss bridges ===
Timber truss road bridges have played a significant role in the expansion and improvement of the NSW road network. Prior to the bridges being built, river crossings were often dangerous in times of rain, which caused bulk freight movement to be prohibitively expensive for most agricultural and mining produce. Only the high priced wool clip of the time was able to carry the costs and inconvenience imposed by the generally inadequate river crossings that often existed prior to the trusses construction.

Timber truss bridges were preferred by the NSW Public Works Department from the mid 19th to the early 20th century because they were relatively cheap to construct, and used mostly local materials. The financially troubled governments of the day applied pressure to the Public Works Department to produce as much road and bridge work for as little cost as possible, using local materials. This condition effectively prohibited the use of iron and steel, as these, prior to the construction of the steel works at Newcastle in the early 20th century, had to be imported from England.

Timber truss bridges, and timber bridges generally were so common that NSW was known to travellers as the "timber bridge state".

=== Clarence Town bridge ===
The Clarence Town bridge was built to replace a local ford which was impassable when the river was high. The tender of contractor J. K. Mackenzie was accepted in January 1879, and construction was underway by April that year. Work on the bridge was delayed when a flood carried away and destroyed some of the bridge cylinders before they were in place.

The original bridge was formally opened on 24 May 1880, with the wife of local MP, William Johnston breaking a bottle of wine under an arch.

By 1924, the local council was expressing concern about the "dangerous condition" of the original bridge. The bridge was completely rebuilt in 1926 at a budgeted sum of A£8,000. Light traffic had to use an antiquated punt in the interim, while heavy traffic had to use an old ford, resulting in local complaints and demands for the work to be expedited. The bridge reopened for traffic in October 1926.

More recently, cables have been retrofitted to strengthen the bridge structure.

== Description ==
Clarence Town Bridge is an old Public Works Department type timber truss road bridge. It has two timber truss spans, each of 30 metres (100 ft). There are three timber approach spans at one end and one at the other giving the bridge an overall length of 116 metres (380 ft). The main spans are supported by twin cast iron cylindrical piers braced with iron stiffeners and provides a single-lane carriageway. The minimum width of the carriageway is 4.6 metres (15 ft). A timber post and rail guard rail extends the full length of the bridge.

At the time of the study Bailey trusses were located on the bridge for temporary support during major repairs. Cables have been retro-fitted to strengthen the bridge structure.

It was reported to be in a fair condition as at 1998, although having been completely rebuilt, and having had under-cables added for support.

== Heritage listing ==
The Clarence Town bridge is an Old Public Works Department (Old PWD) type timber truss road bridge, which was completed in 1880, and was completely rebuilt in 1926/7. In 1998 it was in a fair condition.

As a timber truss road bridge, it has many associational links with important historical events, trends, and people, including the expansion of the road network and economic activity throughout NSW, and William Bennett, the Commissioner for Public Works responsible for construction of many of the bridges.

Old PWD trusses were the first in the five-stage development of NSW timber truss bridges. Constructed from timber to conform with the 1861 parliamentary decree that local materials should be used in public works, the trusses took advantage of the high quality hardwood that was available in NSW. The design is essentially a copy of the European timber truss bridges that had their origins in the work of the 16th century Italian architect Andrea Palladio.

Clarence Town Bridge is located in the Hunter region, which has 15 historic bridges each constructed before 1905, and it gains heritage significance from its proximity to the high concentration of other historic bridges in the area.

In 1998 there were two surviving Old PWD trusses in NSW of the 147 built, and 82 timber truss road bridges survive from the over 400 built. The Clarence Town Bridge is the oldest surviving timber truss bridge in NSW.

The Clarence Town bridge is a representative and rare example of Old PWD timber truss road bridges, and is assessed as being Nationally significant, primarily on the basis of its technical and historical significance.

Clarence Town Bridge over Williams River was listed on the New South Wales State Heritage Register on 20 June 2000 having satisfied the following criteria.

The place is important in demonstrating the course, or pattern, of cultural or natural history in New South Wales.

Through the bridge's association with the expansion of the NSW road network, its ability to demonstrate historically important concepts such as the gradual acceptance of NSW people of American design ideas, and its association with William Bennett, it has historical significance.

The place is important in demonstrating aesthetic characteristics and/or a high degree of creative or technical achievement in New South Wales.

The bridge exhibits the technical excellence of its design, as all of the structural detail is clearly visible. In the context of its landscape it is visually attractive. As such, the bridge has moderate aesthetic significance.

The place has strong or special association with a particular community or cultural group in New South Wales for social, cultural or spiritual reasons.

Timber truss bridges are prominent to road travellers, and NSW has in the past been referred to as the "timber truss bridge state". Through this, the complete set of bridges gain some social significance, as they could be said to be held in reasonable esteem by many travellers in NSW. The Clarence Town Bridge is valued by the people of the Hunter region.

The place possesses uncommon, rare or endangered aspects of the cultural or natural history of New South Wales.

The bridge is highly rare, as it is one of only two old PWD design bridges to survive out of 147 built.

The place is important in demonstrating the principal characteristics of a class of cultural or natural places/environments in New South Wales.

The bridge is highly representative of a once prolific form of construction.

== See also ==
- List of bridges in Australia
