= Stroud, New South Wales =

Stroud
- Town
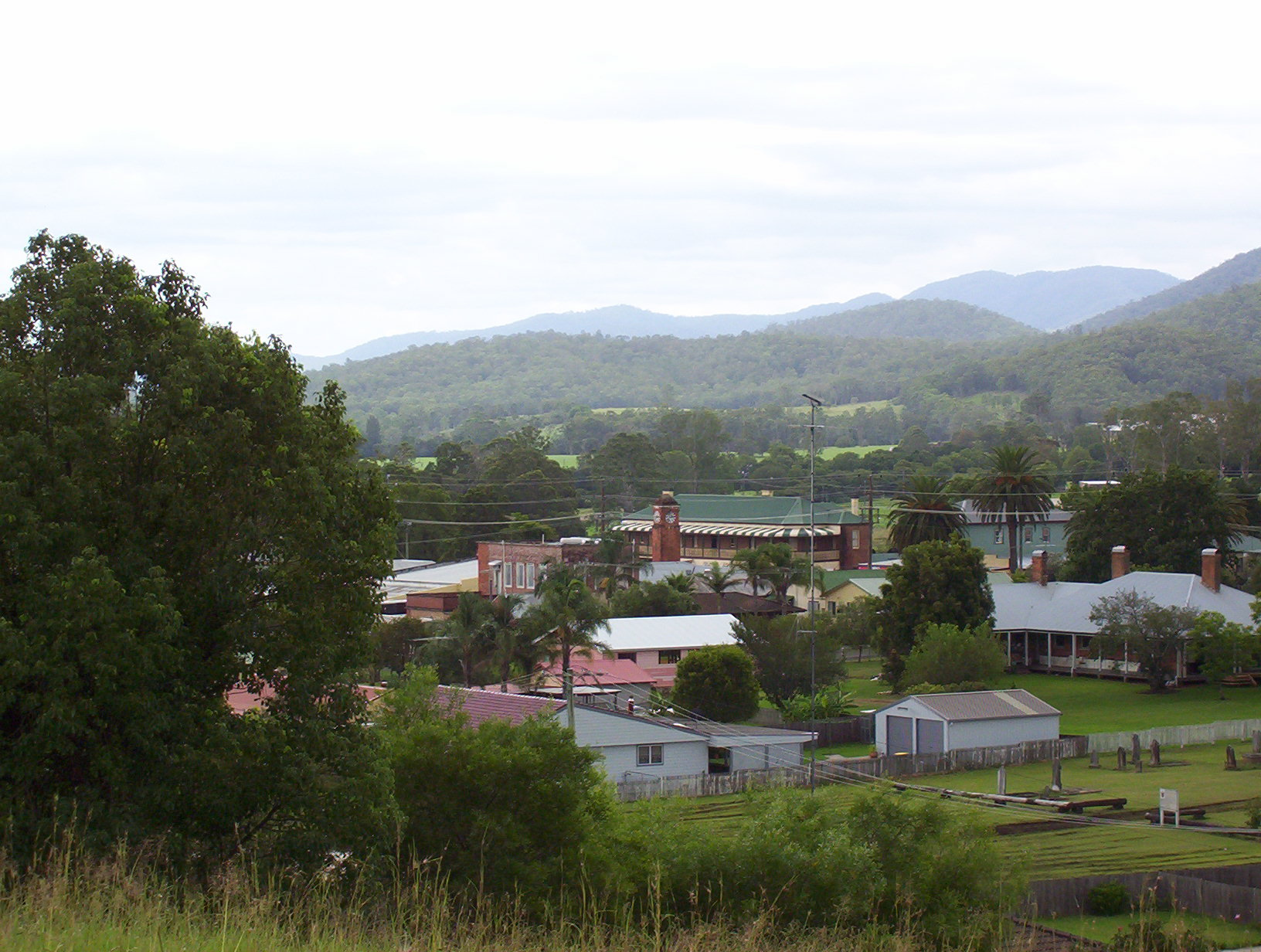
- Stroud Town Centre

- Coordinates: 32°24′0″S 151°58′0″E
- Country: Australia
- State: New South Wales
- LGA: Mid-Coast Council
- Location: 223 km (139 mi) N of Sydney; 74 km (46 mi) N of Newcastle; 27 km (17 mi) E of Dungog; 11 km (6.8 mi) S of Gloucester; 38 km (24 mi) W of Bulahdelah
- Established: 1820s

Government
  - State electorate: Upper Hunter
  - Federal division: Lyne
- Elevation: 43 m (141 ft)

Population
  - Total: 988 (2021 census)
- Postcode: 2425
Localities around Stroud
Washpool	Stroud Road	Markwell
Washpool	Stroud	Girvan
Cambra	Booral	Girvan

Stroud Clock Tower

Stroud is a small country town one hour north of Newcastle, New South Wales, Australia. It is part of the Mid-Coast Council local government area. The major road through Stroud is the Bucketts Way. At the 2021 census, Stroud had a population of 988.

The township of Stroud can trace its beginning back to the late 1820s when it became the headquarters for a public funded company known as the Australian Agricultural Company (A. A. Company). In 1824, this company received a grant of 1,000,000 acres (400,000 ha) of land between Port Stephens and the Manning River. This land was to be used for agriculture.

Stroud was a self-contained village by 1832 and, as early as 1836, the company's storehouses and much of the convict labour force were located there. By 1850, it had become the company's headquarters. Land was subdivided for private settlement in 1849, with settlers arriving from England the following year to take up land grants there.

Many fine buildings were constructed at Stroud. Some of these are still in use today: Stroud House (1827–32); St John's Church (1833) and Quambi School House (late 1830s), and the underground grain silos, built by the A. A. Company for the storage of grain.

== Sport ==
In 2007 the Stroud Raiders a men's football team reformed. With strong performances through the year the Raiders were the Minor and Major Premiers for 2007. There is also a women's league tag team of the same name, forming in 2016. Stroud also has a cricket team. These teams share the Stroud Showground. Stroud has four tennis courts which is home to the Stroud Tennis Club, and a twenty five metre pool which is usually open from October to April for use for free by the community. Golf and bowls are played at the Stroud and District Country Club.

Some of the sports facilities, along with houses, property and camping grounds, were severely damaged in April 2015 in a large storm that caused flash flooding.

== Events ==
The Stroud Show is usually the first weekend after Easter.

The Stroud International Brick and Pin Throwing Contest is usually held on a Saturday in July . This coincides with the same event in three other Strouds: Oklahoma , Gloucestershire and IStroud, Ontario.

The Stroud Rodeo is usually the third weekend in September.

Retreats and conferences are held at the Franciscan Monastery of the Blessed Virgin Mary.

== Education ==
Stroud has a primary school which was established in 1884.

== Railways ==
It was not possible for the North Coast railway line to serve Stroud. A railway station was established at Stroud Road but this is now closed and the nearest station is at Dungog.

== Heritage listings ==
Stroud has a number of heritage-listed sites, including:

- Cowper Street: St John the Evangelist Church
- 42 Cowper Street: Stroud House

== Twin town ==
(United Kingdom) Stroud, Gloucestershire, UK
