= List of judge advocates of New South Wales =

People who served as Judge Advocate of New South Wales are:

	Name	From	Until
1.	David Collins	1788	1796
2.	Richard Bowyer Atkins	1796	1798
3.	Richard Dore	9 September 1797	13 December 1800 (died)
4.	Richard Bowyer Atkins (Note: Following the Rum Rebellion in January 1808, Major George Johnston who was acting as governor, purported to suspend Atkins and appoint Kemp as acting deputy judge advocate. In that capacity Kemp sat in the illegal court which tried William Gore for perjury. Atkins was reinstated in December 1808.)	1800	1809
	Anthony Fenn Kemp	January 1808	December 1808
5.	Ellis Bent	1810	10 November 1815 (died)
	Frederick Garling (Note: Acting deputy judge advocate following the death of Ellis Bent until the arrival of John Wylde)	12 December 1815	5 October 1816
6.	John Wylde	5 October 1816	1824
