= Supreme Court of Civil Judicature of New South Wales =

The Supreme Court of Civil Judicature of New South Wales was a court established in the early 19th century in the colony of New South Wales. The colony was subsequently to become a state of Australia in 1901. The court had jurisdiction to deal with civil disputes where the amount in dispute in the colony was more than £50 sterling. The Supreme Court of New South Wales replaced the court in 1823 when the Supreme Court was created by the Third Charter of Justice.

== Background ==
The British government established the colony of New South Wales primarily as a penal colony with the intention of encouraging later settlement. Captain Arthur Phillip was appointed as the colony's first governor and did much to ensure the colony survived and transformed into a modern colonial outpost

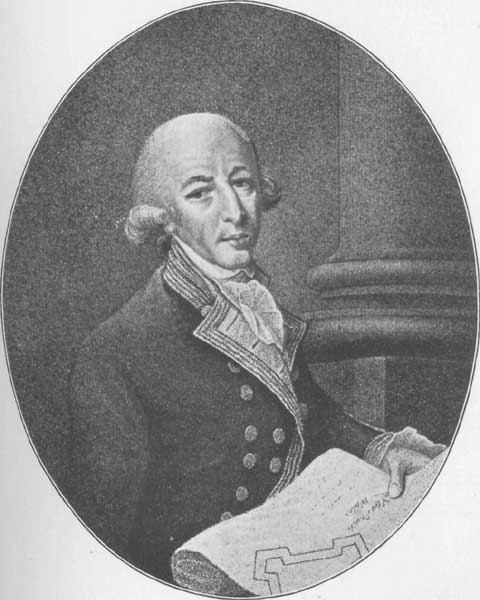
Arthur Phillip

Notwithstanding its beginnings as a penal colony, it soon prospered as a booming agricultural and mercantile colony. With the increased prosperity came the need for better access to forms of civil justice. Systems for the resolution of commercial disputes are an important part of the common law tradition in British based legal systems, particularly with the establishment of the rule of law.

The British authorities foresaw the need for a civil judicial system when the colony was first established. A court styled the "Court of Civil Jurisdiction" was established by the First Charter of Justice as well as a Court of Vice-Admiralty pursuant to letters patent from the High Admiralty in Great Britain. The Governor of New South Wales would also in time authorise magistrates (the common name for justices of the peace in the colony at the time) to determine smaller debt claims that were taking up the time of these original civil courts. Author Hilary Golder points to research that magistrates were in fact dealing with small debt claims as early as 1789, one year after the commencement of the colony.

Ellis Bent, the first barrister appointed as Deputy Judge Advocate for the colony, made recommendations to Governor Lachlan Macquarie for the establishment of new civil courts. This was to reflect the changing nature of society in New South Wales from a penal colony to a trading colony. Bent's recommendation also reflected the public sentiment in New South Wales that it was time for a legally qualified judge to head a superior court in the colony, rather than a military officer who happened to have legal qualifications. Macquarie supported this. Whilst not all of Bent's recommendations were taken up, a Select Committee of the House of Commons reporting on the question of transportation to the colonies made similar recommendations. Eventually the British authorities arranged for new charters to issue for the reform of the civil courts and it is possible that the new courts were established in response to the Rum Rebellion in 1807 and 1808.

== Constitution ==
The British authorities introduced three new civil courts into the colony. They were the Governors Court which had jurisdiction over civil claims in New South Wales and a Lieutenant Governor's Court to deal with civil claims in Van Diemen's Land. Each court was limited to the value of fifty pounds sterling.

For claims over fifty pounds, a new court styled the "Supreme Court of Civil Judicature" was established. This court was commonly known as the "Supreme Court", a usual practice in British colonies according to author and judge William Windeyer. The court was created by letters patent dated 4 February 1814 issued by King George III the reigning sovereign of England at the time. It was composed of a judge (who was appointed by the British authorities, and two magistrates (the common name used for justices of the peace at the time) appointed by the Governor of New South Wales. The judge was the presiding officer. Alternatively, the court could be constituted by just the judge and one of the two magistrates appointed by the governor.

The court had jurisdiction to hear and determine actions summarily relating to land, houses, debt, contract, trespass, and just about any other common law or equitable cases over the value of £50 sterling. One defect in the Court was the ability for a governor to possibly "stack" the court. Sir John Wylde, the last judge-advocate for the colony and the last judge of this court, noted in a report to the British authorities that there was such a possibility of appointing laymen with no legal knowledge to the court. Biographer R. J. Mckay suggests that Governor Thomas Brisbane had in fact attempted to do this.

== Sittings of the court under Jeffery Bent ==
Jeffery Bent, the first judge of the court, arrived in Sydney by boat on 28 July 1814 with great expectations. Governor Lachlan Macquarie had high hopes for Bent. However, Bent refused to come ashore until he was honoured with a salute appropriate to his status. Macquarie authorised an appropriate salute with gunfire and Bent disembarked. Bent was subsequently sworn in as a judge on 12 August 1814.

After being sworn in, Bent refused to open his court until proper facilities were put in place for his use. Bent and Macquarie argued over the proper place to hold the court. Bent sought the use of the southern wing of the general hospital for use of the court and for judge's chambers. However, Macquarie had already allocated these for medical uses. Macquarie instead provided the southern wing and central area of the hospital. The matter was eventually decided by the British authorities which came down in favour of Macquarie.

At the end of 1814, the new court house which Macquarie had authorised to be built had been completed. However, Bent refused to sit until there were proper lawyers who could appear in his court. The "lawyers" in New South Wales at that time were all ex-convicts who had been transported to New South Wales for their crimes. As a result of their punishment, they were struck off from the roll of lawyers in England and therefore not eligible to practise as a lawyer. Prior to Bent leaving for Sydney, Bent had recommended that two lawyers from England be assisted to Sydney. They were William Moore and Frederick Garling. Whilst Moore had arrived in the colony on 27 January 1815, Garling's ship had been delayed until August 1815.

Supreme Court building

It therefore appeared likely that the court would not sit until late in 1815. In April 1815, Macquarie then attempted to recommend the appointment of George Crossley and Edward Eagar to Bent. Both Crossley and Eagar were ex-convict lawyers. Crossley was a colourful one as well. However, Bent railed against Macquarie, alleging inference with matters judicial. Macquarie was powerless to act, as Bent's commission did not require him to obey Macquarie's directions.

Bent decided to open court on 1 May notwithstanding the absence of Garling. Macquarie nominated two magistrates to sit with Bent. They were William Broughton and Alexander Riley. After a number of stormy interactions between them and Bent, Broughton and Riley were of the view that ex-convict lawyers should be admitted temporarily to appear before the court until Garling had arrived. Bent, furious that his views were being disregarded, refused to sit on the bench, thereby effectively preventing the court from sitting.

This refusal, with other difficulties mounting between Macquarie and the two Bents, led to Macquarie writing to the British authorities asking for both of the Bents to be removed, to which Lord Bathurst agreed in January 1816. Whilst Bathurst agreed that ex-convicts should not practise, he also took the view that the absence of the sittings of the court was more serious an issue that admitting ex-convicts, and that the court should actually sit.

Bent decided to resume sitting on 5 October 1816 when Garling ceased acting as Deputy Judge Advocate. However, Bent deferred this resumption until 1 December 1816. Macquarie at his wits' end decided to cancel the appointments of the two magistrates to sit on the court. This effectively prevented Bent from resuming the sittings. However, Bent decided to issue a warrant for the arrest of Riley. The provost-marshal declined to execute, and eventually Macquarie was to issue a declaration that Bent was "'positively and absolutely removed from his appointment as Judge of the Supreme Court in, and a magistrate of this Territory".

== Sittings of the court under Barron Field ==
Barron Field was appointed as the replacement for Bent in May 1816. Field's arrival in the colony signified that the court would actually start sitting. However, Field's independence was to prove questionable. Soon after his arrival, he instructed an English attorney practising in the colony to sue for the sum of £424 owed to a London merchant who had given Field his power of attorney. This was unusual as Field was a litigant in his own court and would have therefore decided his own case. Unfortunately for Field, whilst he was naturally successful in his action, the English attorney didn't transfer the money recovered to Field. Field then sued the attorney for the sum. Field further threatened to strike the attorney off the roll of attorneys (or in other words, disbar him) if the money wasn't paid. Even when the attorney provided the money, Field still struck off the attorney. Royal Commissioner John Thomas Bigge was later to criticize Field for the latter action.

Field's term as judge was not to improve. Field attempted to admit as an attorney a convict who had been struck off in England for numerous offences. Field then also ruled that pardoned convicts were unable to hold property, sue or give evidence in any Court. This was particularly resented, as the colony at that time was made up largely of ex-convicts who had served their sentences in the penal colony. Commissioner Bigge commented upon this by saying 'The convict part of the population of New South Wales view Mr Justice Field's administration of the law with sentiments of dissatisfaction. The free classes of the population … equally apprehend the effects of his violent and unforgiving temper, as well as of his personal prejudices, upon his future decisions … In my opinion, Mr Justice Field does not possess that degree of temper and deliberation necessary to conduct the judicial business of such a Colony'. Bigge was to eventually recommend the abolition of the court and that Field should not be appointed to the new Supreme Court.

== Sittings in Van Diemen's Land ==
Field was the first superior court judge to sit in Van Diemen's Land, which was to eventually become the State of Tasmania. This occurred in January 1819. The settlement had been hampered by the lack of sittings of a superior court. Most suitors had to structure cases so that they could be brought in the Lieutenant Governor's Court, a court which was limited to £50. For cases over that amount, suitors would have to make an arduous journey from Hobart to Sydney. At the time, the journey took weeks or even months in the treacherous waters off the eastern coast of Australia.

Field was welcomed into "Hobart Town" after his journey from Sydney with a thirteen gun salute by the Lieutenant-Governor of the settlement. The first sittings of the court was preceded by a parade of Field in his ceremonial robes with all of the settlement's magistrates. As it was the English Queen's birthday, a twenty one gun salute was also given. A building in the settlement was converted into a court room for the sittings.

The following year in 1820, Field held further sittings in Hobart. On this occasion, both Field and Judge Advocate Wylde held civil and criminal courts in Van Diemen's Land. In the latter case, Field constituted the Court of Criminal Jurisdiction, the first time that court sat in Hobart.

== Sittings under John Wylde ==
Bigge's recommendation was for the court to be abolished. He also recommended that Field not be reappointed to any new court created in New South Wales. Field as a consequence sailed immediately for England in the Competitor in February 1824. He did not wait for the arrival of a successor nor for the establishment of the new court. Biographer Currey suggests that Field effectively "deserted his post", which would effectively mean that Field was the first judge in Australia to do so.

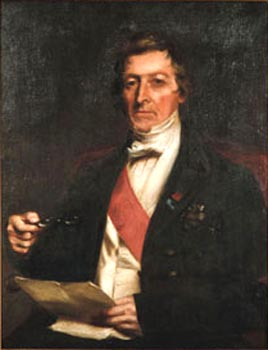
Thomas Brisbane

Ironically, John Wylde who had nominated Field for the position of judge in the first place, graciously stepped in and volunteered to Governor Thomas Brisbane that he should act as judge in the absence of Field. Brisbane accepted this gesture, although it would seem that Brisbane was happy to see both Field and Wylde leave the colony. Accordingly, Wylde was sworn in as judge on 23 March 1824. He continued to act in the role until the new Supreme Court of New South Wales opened under Francis Forbes on 17 May 1824.

== Rules of court ==
The Rules and Orders of the court were drawn up by Field rather than Bent. The rules followed the procedures in use at the time in England in superior courts. This marked a departure from earlier courts in New South Wales where formality had been minimised to some extent due to the colonial conditions at the time. Equity proceedings used the traditional parchments. Longer and more complex documents became the norm under the Court. This led to criticisms that the Court was being bogged down in legal procedures rather than doing justice to the case.

After the abolition of the Court, the Chief Justice of the new Supreme Court, Francis Forbes, remarked that the changes introduced by Field in the Rules were prone to being badly received by the public. Forbes said that the public "might be excused for believing,[that the rules] were not so operative in facilitating the ends of justice, as in filling the pockets of the practitioners" This was particularly a concern as lawyers in those days were paid by number of words written, and longer and more complex documents allowed steeper legal fees to be charged.

== Abolition ==
The court's workload was light. Between April 1817 and January 1821 Bigge reported that the Court dealt with 165 actions at law and 13 suits in equity. Bigge's recommendation was that this court, the Governors Court and the Lieutenant Governor's Court should be abolished and replaced with two new superior courts. Subsequently, the court was abolished in 1823 after being in existence for some nine years, but effectively only sitting for seven years. It was replaced by two new Supreme Courts in New South Wales and in Van Diemens Land. Both courts were to be statutory courts established by Letters Patent dated 13 October 1823. Those letters were authorised by the British Parliament through the passing of the New South Wales Act 1823 (UK).

== Appeals ==
There was provision for an appeal to the Governor of New South Wales. The governor was assisted by the Judge-Advocate of the colony. Where the amount in dispute did not exceed £3,000, the governor's decision was final and there was no further provision for appeal. If the amount exceeded £3,000, then there was a right of further appeal to the Privy Council. In some situations, the appellant had to give security to the value of at least double the amount in dispute before appealing. Of course, there was the expectation of extensive delay in pursuing a further appeal as a journey back to England would be required to litigate the matter.

== Sources ==
- Castles, Alex (1975). A Legal History of Australia. Law Book Co.
