= Governors Court =

The Governors Court was a court established in the early 19th century in the colony of New South Wales. The colony was subsequently to become a state of Australia in 1901. The court had jurisdiction to deal with civil disputes where the amount in dispute in the colony was not more than £50 sterling. The Supreme Court of New South Wales replaced the court in 1823 when the Supreme Court was created by the Third Charter of Justice.

== Background ==
The British government established the colony of New South Wales primarily as a penal colony with the intention of encouraging later settlement. Captain Arthur Phillip was appointed as the colony’s first governor and did much to ensure the colony survived and transformed into a modern colonial outpost

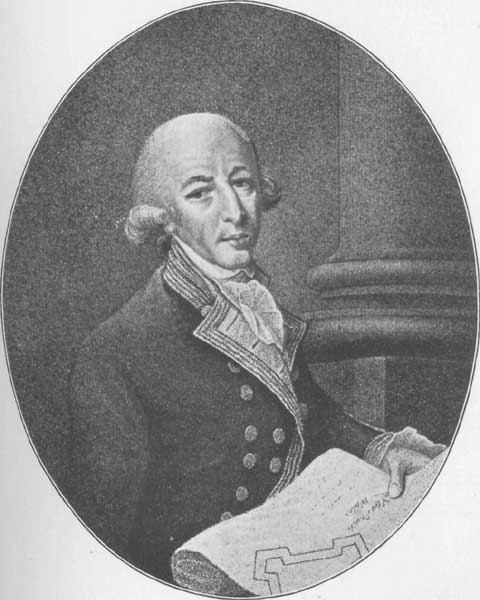
Arthur Phillip

Notwithstanding its beginnings as a penal colony, it soon prospered as a booming agricultural and mercantile colony. With the increased prosperity came the need for better access to forms of civil justice. Systems for the resolution of commercial disputes are an important part of the common law tradition in British based legal systems, particularly with the establishment of the rule of law. The British authorities foresaw the need for a civil judicial system to be established when the colony was first established. A court styled the “Court of Civil Jurisdiction” was established by the First Charter of Justice as well as a Court of Vice-Admiralty pursuant to letters patent from the High Admiralty in Great Britain. The Governor of New South Wales would also in time authorise magistrates (the common name for justices of the peace in the colony at the time) to determine smaller debt claims that were taking up the time of these original civil courts. Hilary Golder points to research that magistrates were in fact dealing with small debt claims as early 1789, one year after the commencement of the colony. Ellis Bent, the first barrister appointed as deputy judge advocate for the colony, made recommendations to Governor Lachlan Macquarie for the establishment of new civil courts to reflect the changing nature of the society from a penal colony to a trading colony. This reflected the public sentiment in New South Wales that it was time for a legally qualified judge to head a superior court in the colony, rather than a military officer who happened to have legal qualifications. Macquarie supported this and eventually the British authorities arranged for new charters to issue for the reform of the civil courts.

== Constitution ==
The British authorities introduced three new civil courts to the colony. There was a Supreme Court of Civil Judicature (commonly referred to as the “Supreme Court” which had jurisdiction over civil claims in New South Wales and the settlement at Van Diemen’s Land. There was also established a Lieutenant Governor’s Court to deal with civil claims in Van Diemen’s Land. In respect of New South Wales, a court styled the “Governors Court” was established. The court was created by Letters Patent dated 4 February 1814 issued by King George III the reigning sovereign of England at the time. It was composed of the deputy judge-advocate, commonly known in the colony as the “judge-advocate”, and two other persons appointed by the Governor of New South Wales. The judge-advocate was the presiding officer. Alternatively, the court could be constituted by just the judge-advocate and one of the two persons appointed by the governor. The court had jurisdiction to hear and determine actions summarily relating to land, houses, debt, contract, trespass, and just about any other common law or equitable cases up to £50 sterling in value. One defect in the Court was the ability for a governor to possibly “stack” the court. Sir John Wylde, the last judge-advocate for the colony, and the last judge-advocate to preside, noted in a report to the British authorities that there was such a possibility of appointing laymen with no legal knowledge to the court and R. J. Mckay suggests that Governor Thomas Brisbane had in fact attempted to do this.

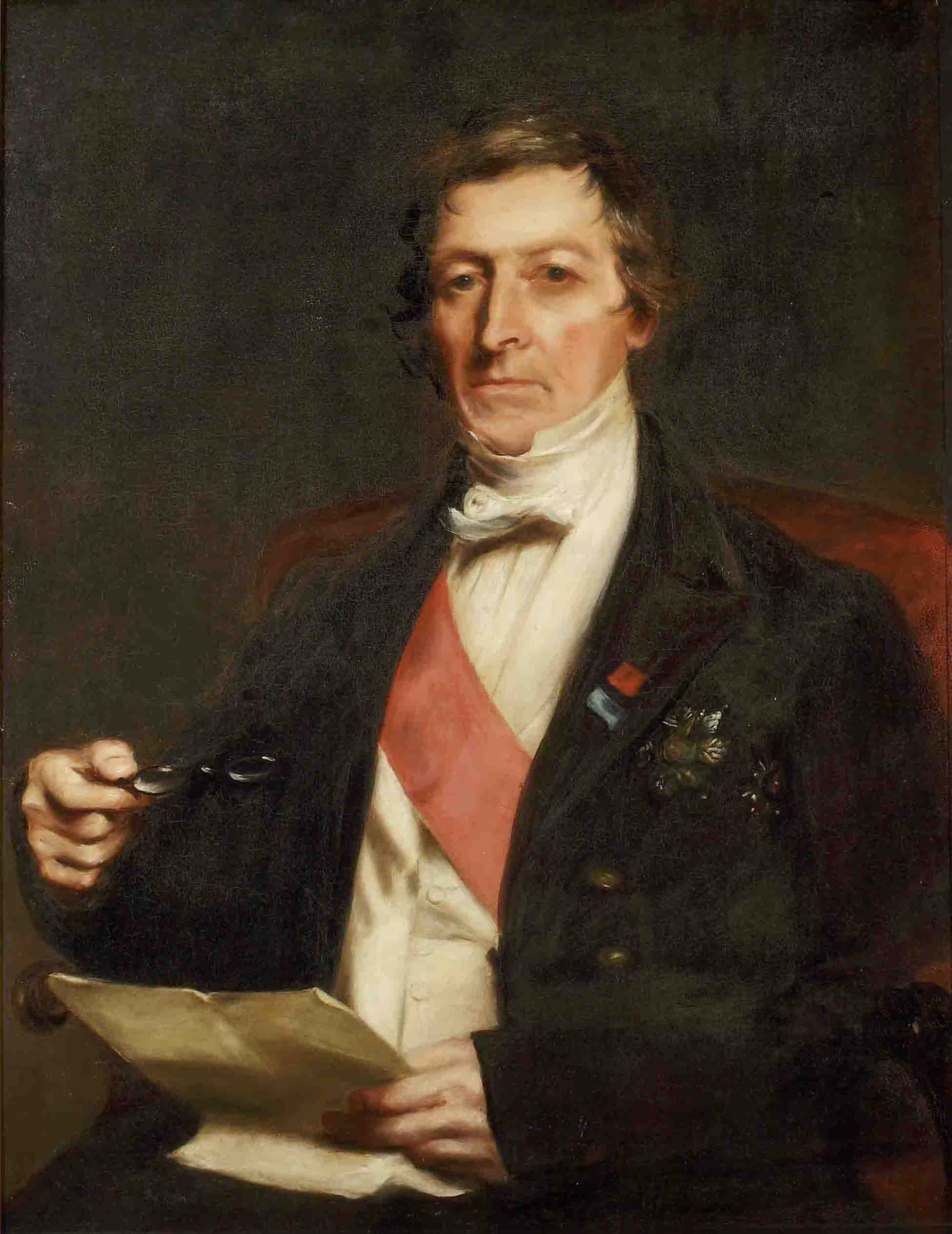
Governor Thomas Brisbane

== Sittings of the court ==
The court first sat in May 1815. Macquarie appointed Richard Brooks and Charles Hook as respectable persons to sit with Bent on the new Court. Bent, being under the influence of his brother Jeffery Hart Bent, had Brooks and Hook unanimously adopt a rule that no attorney who had been struck off the roll of lawyers should be admitted to practise before the court. This was to lead to a falling out between Bent and Macquarie over the status of emancipated convicts. The rule was particularly onerous as there were no attorneys in the colony who hadn't arrived there as convicts. As each convict attorney had been struck off the roll, effectively there was no attorney who could appear in the court. The court later sat with Frederick Garling as acting deputy judge advocate after the death of Bent. Sir John Wylde was appointed by the British authorities in 1815 as Bent’s successor and presided in the Court until its abolition in 1823. From about 1817, the court also sat twice a year outside Sydney. New South Wales State Archives records show that the court at least sat at Parramatta and Windsor for the trial of causes.

Building where court was held in early 1800s

== Appeals ==
There was no right of appeal from decisions of the court. This was in contrast to the situation with the Supreme Court of Civil Judicature where there was a right of appeal to the Governor sitting as a court of appeal, with a possible further right of appeal to the Judicial Committee of the Privy Council. The lack of a right of appeal reflected the fact that British authorities intended the court as a Court of Requests dispensing justice in a more summary way. As the amounts involved before the court were usually quite small, the cost of an appeal would have exceeded whatever was recovered in any event.

== Rules of court ==
The Rules and Orders of the Governors Court were drawn up by Ellis Bent who was the deputy-judge-advocate at the time of the creation of the court. The rules included provisions relating to the rights of attorneys to practise, how writs were issued and returned, the keeping of court records, the execution of judgements and pleading procedure. An original copy of those rules is held by the State Library of New South Wales with annotations later made by Bent’s successor Wylde.

== Abolition ==
The court was abolished in 1823 after sitting for some eight years. It was replaced by the newly created Supreme Court of New South Wales established by Letters Patent dated 13 October 1823. Those letters were authorised by the British Parliament through the passing of the New South Wales Act 1823 (UK).

== Sources ==
- Alex Castles, A Legal History of Australia, Law Book Co, 1975.
