= Edward Abbott (jurist) =

Australian public servant (1766–1832)

- Born: November 9, 1766; Montreal, Quebec, Canada
- Died: July 31, 1832 (aged 65)
- Occupations: Soldier; Politician; Judge-advocate

Edward Abbott (9 November 1766 – 31 July 1832) was a soldier, politician, judge-advocate and public servant who served at Parramatta, the Hawkesbury River and Norfolk Island in the colony of New South Wales, now part of present-day Australia. He also served at the settlements of Launceston and Hobart in Van Diemen's Land (now the Australian state of Tasmania), which was part of New South Wales until 1825, when Van Diemen's Land became a self-governing colony.

== Military years ==
Abbott was born on 9 November 1766 in Montreal, Quebec, Canada, the son of Lieutenant Edward Abbott, Royal Artillery, and Angelique Trottier Desrivieres. He was commissioned as a lieutenant in 1785 and joined the New South Wales Corps in October 1789 (commonly known in Australia as the "Rum Corps"). He arrived in Sydney in June 1790, and served as an officer on Norfolk Island until 1794.

In that year, he returned to Sydney (then called Port Jackson) and took command of the detachment of soldiers at the settlement at Hawkesbury River. He was promoted to captain in 1795 but had to return to England in 1796 due to illness. He returned to Sydney in 1799 and served in both Sydney and Norfolk Island again. In 1803 he took command of the detachment at the settlement at Parramatta, and the governor appointed him a magistrate. During his command in 1804, he helped quell an "Irish" insurrection, for which Governor Philip King gave him a grant of land.

In 1808, Abbott was transferred to Sydney by Major George Johnston to assist in the opposition to Governor William Bligh. He apparently took no active part in the coup (the "Rum Rebellion") which removed Bligh, but approved of the governor's arrest. Johnston offered the position of deputy judge advocate to Abbott. This position was the senior judicial position in the colony which was held at the time by a non-lawyer, Richard Atkins. Biographer W A Townsley states that Abbott declined the appointment. Historian John Bennett notes that Abbott did take up the offer of the appointment before Charles Grimes took over that office.

Abbott was promoted to major in May 1808. He returned to England in 1810, where he resigned from the army.

== Judicial career ==
In February 1814 Abbott was commissioned as the second deputy judge advocate of Van Diemen's Land. He was however to be first to be able to constitute the newly established Lieutenant Governor's Court in 1815. This new court was the first superior civil court to sit permanently in the settlement and it was an important step in bringing normality to the commercial life of the colony.

Abbott sailed for Hobart Town in the Emu in February 1815 but was unable to commence his duties as his commission had not arrived. However, he was commissioned as a magistrate, and sat in the Court of Petty Sessions dealing with less serious criminal charges. To complicate matters further, Lieutenant-Governor Thomas Davey proclaimed martial law in April of that year. Abbott opposed the imposition of martial law and declined to open the new court as the institution of martial law was incompatible with holding a court under civil law. Nevertheless, Abbott sat on several courts-martial arising out of the declaration of martial law.

Abbott travelled to Sydney to obtain documents on the practice of his new court. His court was a sister court to the Governors Court in New South Wales and could be expected to have the same practices and procedures. When he returned in November, martial law had ended and the new court was formally opened.

Governor Lachlan Macquarie considered Abbott's appointment unwise. However, Abbott was considered a very successful deputy judge advocate. He simplified procedures in the new court and administered justice rather than legal principles and applied common sense. Abbott was novel in his approach to the law and, unlike other English courts at the time, did not take a portion of the fees charged for going to court.

The office of deputy judge advocate and the Lieutenant Governor's Court were abolished on the establishment of the new Supreme Court of Van Diemen's Land. Abbott was offered the appointment as a commissioner of the Court of Requests. He declined the appointment and instead returned to England and accepted a pension.

== Political career ==
In 1825, Abbott was appointed as the civil commandant at Port Dalrymple, a settlement now known as the city of Launceston, displacing Lieutenant-Colonel William Balfour. Abbott was also appointed to the Legislative Council of Van Diemen's Land. Lieutenant-Governor George Arthur protested Abbott's appointment to the Colonial Office in London. In response, Abbott lost his appointment as commandant and as a Legislative Councillor, and he was appointed instead as a commissioner in the Court of Requests, an appointment he had previously declined.

== Death ==
Abbott died in 1832, survived by his wife and sons. His son Edward worked as Abbott's clerk in the court and later became a member of the new House of Assembly in Van Diemen's Land and also the Legislative Council.
