= Garden Island Naval Precinct =

Heritage-listed naval base and defence precinct located at Cowper Wharf Roadway

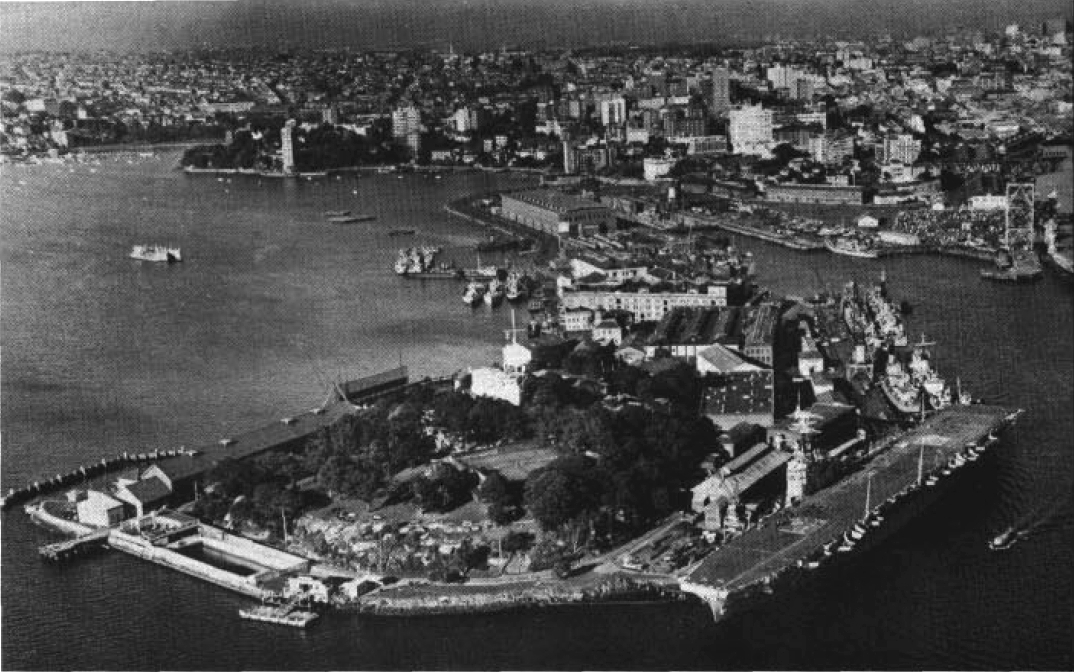
- Garden Island Naval Precinct, c. 1962

- Location within Sydney Location within Australia
- 33°51′55″S 151°13′35″E
- Location: Cowper Wharf Roadway, Garden Island, Sydney, New South Wales, Australia

History
- Built: 1856–

Site notes
- Architect(s): James Barnet; under the authority of the Lords Commissioners of the Admiralty
- Owner: Australian Department of Defence

Commonwealth Heritage List
- Official name: Garden Island Precinct, Cowper Wharf Rd, Garden Island, NSW, Australia
- Type: Listed place (complex / group)
- Designated: 22 June 2004
- Reference no.: 105286
- Class: Historic
- Place File No.: 1/12/036/0369

New South Wales Heritage Register
- Official name: Sydney Harbour Naval Precinct; Garden Island; Captain Cook Graving Dock; HMAS Penguin; HMAS Kuttabul; Ba-ing-hoe; Derawan; Darrawunn
- Type: State heritage (complex / group)
- Designated: 12 November 2004
- Reference no.: 1705
- Type: Defence Base Naval
- Category: Defence

The Garden Island Naval Precinct is a heritage-listed naval base and defence precinct located at Cowper Wharf Roadway in the inner eastern Sydney neighbourhood of Garden Island, New South Wales, Australia. The precinct was built from 1856. It includes the HMAS Kuttabul naval base, formerly known as HMAS Penguin. The property is owned by Australian Department of Defence. It was added to the Commonwealth Heritage List on 22 June 2004 and the New South Wales State Heritage Register on 12 November 2004.

== History ==
The Garden Island Naval Precinct, incorporates Fleet Base East, including the Garden Island Dockyard and adjacent facility Sydney Maritime Headquarters (MHQ) at Potts Point. The precinct is the main naval base in Australia and has the largest repair and refitting dockyard in Australia. Originally established as a British naval depot, the island developed slowly from the early colonial days, with the greatest spurt occurring during World War II. This period saw massive building programs including the construction of the Captain Cook Graving Dock and land reclamation by 1945 that joined the island to the mainland at Potts Point. The dock was then the largest of its kind in the southern hemisphere. The Garden Island facility was for a long period known as HMAS Penguin, after the survey vessel, later depot ship, built in 1876. The Garden Island establishment was commissioned at HMAS Penguin until 1 January 1943. At this time, the base was renamed HMAS Kuttabul in memory of the loss of that depot ship in the Japanese attack of Sydney Harbour.

=== Ba-ing-hoe and Derawan, pre-1788 to the 1820s ===
The topographical formations now known as Garden Island and Potts Point first became recognisable features in the Sydney Harbour landscapes about 6,500 years ago when sea levels stabilised at their current levels. The Cadigal people came to know them by the names of Ba-ing-hoe and Derawan. In June 2004 the NSW Government announced an initiative to reintroduce a dual naming policy for such significant landforms. Over the following few thousand years, the harbour's Aboriginal population gradually increased, developed significant technologies (such as fish-hook making), raw material utilisation (such as recovering shells for tool making), and maximised estuarine food resources from rocky shorelines, such as shellfish.

Within 2–3 years of the arrival of the British in 1788, the Cadigal people's patterns of life were increasingly difficult to sustain, due to conflict, loss of resources, disease and the attractions of developing colonial towns. In 1791 it was reported that only three Cadigal people remained alive after a smallpox epidemic. Others have questioned this rapid demise when, for example, in 1795 it was reported that a large number of people had gathered in Farm Cove, 500 metres (1,600 ft) west of the precinct, for an initiation ceremony.

The island itself must have had some significant connections to certain Aboriginal people, and was known to have been the scene of early armed conflict between local Aboriginal (probably Cadigal) men and British soldiers in 1788. Cadigal use of the island was not recorded by colonial observers, although other Aboriginal associations were reported. The story of Bungaree's death on the island is notable and has been explored by several writers. Although from Broken Bay, "King" Bungaree was recognised by Governor Macquarie as the "Supreme Chief of the Sydney Tribes", and was a well known and respected figure around Sydney. Bungaree had accompanied Matthew Flinders on several of his voyages along the east coast, the Torres Strait and the Gulf of Carpentaria between 1799 and 1803. He travelled with King in 1819, so was probably the first Aboriginal person to have circumnavigated Australia (although not in a single voyage). Macquarie's last vice-regal act was to arrange for Bungaree to be given a boat and net so that he could engage in commercial fishing.

In late 1830 Bungaree was admitted to the General Hospital, and after being sick for some time asked to be taken to Garden Island to die. The 'King's' wish was granted and on 27 November 1830 he died surrounded by "his own tribe, as well as that of Darling Harbour'. A coffin was sent to the island from the government lumber yard, and it was reported that Bungaree was to be buried in Rose Bay next to one of his queens, possibly Matora. Frame argues that Bungaree was taken to die on the island in appreciation of his services to the Royal Navy in assisting Flinders and other navigators. Attenbrow states that by the 1820s the original ways of life of the Cadigal had been lost, although descendants of the Cadigal of 1788 still remained in Sydney. By the 1820s, Ba-ing-hoe and Derawan had become well known in Sydney by the English names of Garden Island and Paddy's Point, and colonial forces were beginning the shape the precinct.

=== The search for a naval depot, 1788–1856 ===
On 5 February 1788 Governor Phillip granted Ba-ing-hoe to the ships' company of HMS Sirius for their use as a garden. On 11 February 1788 a party of men was sent to Garden Island for that purpose. From this time the island became known as Garden Island, although Sirius Island and Sirius Garden Island had some limited use. Conflict with the local Cadigal people began at this time when, on 18 February, 17 Aboriginal men (probably Cadigal), landed on the island and collected some of the garden tools lying around. The Royal Marines fired small shot at their legs, forcing them to drop some of the tools before they got away back to the mainland.

Thus, within weeks of the First Fleet's arrival, the island had become a microcosm of the future of relations between Aboriginal people and their colonisers. Even more tangible evidence of the invasion of the Cadigal domain was provided by some of the early gardeners when three men carved their initials into a rock on the island's northern hill: "FM", "IR" and "WB" with the year "1788". The men were clearly staking a visual, if unofficial, claim to English control of the land. The garden continued to be cultivated until the loss of HMS Sirius on Norfolk Island in 1790. Although gardening flourished for some time, the new name of the island, and its associations with the navy, became a permanent reminder if its history since 1788.

In 1789, the Row Boat Guard was established to patrol the harbour for smugglers, and a watch house was built on the island, but later transferred to Watsons Bay because of a lack of fresh water. In 1796 the island was transferred to the company of HMS Supply, and a house was built with convict labour – the first permanent structure on the island. In 1799 a gun battery was established on the island's northern hummock, and between 1800 and 1806 the island was possibly used as a lazaret or quarantine station, but the Royal Navy never relinquished its claims to the island. In 1800 the company of HMS Lady Nelson gained control of the island, and a Dr Brandt, with his pet dog and baboon – which became an attraction for local Sydneysiders to visit the island – lived in the convict house. In April 1803 the Sydney Gazette reported that an Aboriginal man had been shot dead when a party of Aboriginal and white men in canoes and dinghies landed on the island and raided the gardens. A succession of Royal Navy ships companies occupied the island, using it mainly to grow vegetables and fruit for the ship kitchens until 1810 when HMS Hindostan arrived in Sydney with a new Governor, Lachlan Macquarie.

Within a few months of Macquarie's arrival, he had a notice published in the Gazette stating that Garden Island was now part of the Governor's Domain, that all produce of the island was now the Governor's, and prohibited the setting of fires on the island. Thus the island was removed from naval jurisdiction and made part of the vice-regal estates. This action was not contested by the Royal Navy, which was busy with the American War (1812) and the Napoleonic Wars that ended in 1815, and it was not until 1821 that the stationing of Royal Navy ships in Sydney was resumed. By that time the island was considered part of the Domain, and often visited by the public. In 1821 it was proposed to build a monument to the late Princess of Wales on the island. In 1825 the remains of Judge Advocate Ellis Bent were exhumed from the George Street Cemetery (now the site of Sydney Town Hall) and re-interred in a tomb on the island, and in 1826 Bent's close friend, Major John Ovens, was also entombed on the island.

A contemporary wrote in 1842 that "they wished to lay their bones on this little isle, where they had so often wandered to contemplate and admire the beauties of nature". The tomb was located on the southern hummock in a "sylvan glade". In 1827 the tomb was plundered by thieves for the lead of the coffins, and in 1886 the remains were relocated to St Thomas' churchyard in North Sydney. Three years after the entombment, king Bungaree was brought to die on the island (see above). During the 1830s-1850s, the Sydney press often referred to the island's natural beauty in the harbour, and the general public seemed to have made use of the island for rambling and other recreational pursuits, but the lack of suitable boats for tourists hindered their visiting, and eventually became a reason for returning the island to naval control. By the 1850s, the potential for the island as a place of remembrance and public resort was about to end.

=== Developing a naval depot, 1856–1914 ===
Between the 1820s and 1850s, the size of the Royal Navy greatly contracted at a time when the extent of the British Empire continued to grow. At the same time, the technologies of shipping, both naval and merchant, underwent great change with the introduction of steam and the use of steel cladding, to mention just two. The navy continued to be subject to pressures in reducing expenditures, continued to regard the Australasian colonies as offshoots of its East Indies stations, and remained unconvinced as to the value of extensive harbour defence systems. In addition, the imperial authorities in London were coming to a view that the cost of colonial defences should be at least partly born by the colonies. Within New South Wales the view was somewhat different.

The expansion of the wool industry and the gold rushes showed Australia was more than a stopping point between the Pacific and Indian oceans, and the use of Sydney as a base during the Maori Wars in New Zealand emphasised its strategic role. At the same time the agitation for, and then the granting of, responsible government to NSW in 1856 resulted in the elected colonial politicians campaigning for the use of Sydney Harbour as a base for the Royal Navy in the South Pacific.

The navy's then use of Fort Macquarie as its main residence was not secure due to that site's co-use as part of the Sydney Harbour military defence system. Naval agitation to secure a more secure tenure led to requests of the NSW Government to set aside Garden Island as a purely naval preserve. Debate continued over the need to set aside portions of its northern end for harbour defence purposes and to limit naval building in these areas. The Navy took control of the island in 1858 at a time that coincided with the development of the separate British fleet, the "Australia Station" – to guard against aggression by external naval forces. Garden Island became the base for the flotilla. A survey of the island by crew from HMS Herald provides a unique insight into the undeveloped nature of the island and the logistical difficulties of establishing the base. Commodore Loring became the first commander of the Australia Station on 26 March 1859 with his flagship HMS Isis.

From 1860–1864 little progress was made at Garden Island although the presence of some buildings, roads and a slip were noted. Finally in 1865, despite continual changes to the inferred area to be incorporated into naval control, a portion of Garden Island was officially gazetted for sole naval use (10 January 1865). The Colonial Naval Defence Act 1865 allowed for the colonies to form their own navies and to train crew, and cemented the Sydney base as the chief naval station in Australia. Significantly on 5 June 1866 the entire portion of Garden Island was gazetted as a naval depot, finally reflecting the initial discussions and offer of Garden Island for that purpose, back in 1856. Defence requirements continued and a new gun battery in a sunken gun pit was opened on the northern hill in 1871.

Significant building work on the island did not commence until 1885 when the British Admiralty's engineer James Fishenden was sent out from England to plan and oversee works. This saw the levelling of the southern "hummock" of the island, forever changing its visual appearance. The fill deposited onto the southern side increased the land area by 3 acres. 1885 saw the appointment of Rear Admiral Tryon which raised the Australia Station to Flag rank status. A combined Rigging Shed and Sail Loft was to be commenced first, with the foundations of the Rigging Workshop, Kitchen Block, Anchor Store, Chain Store, Factory Workshop and Spar Shed laid in 1886.

Two stone slipways were also commenced on the eastern side of the Sail Loft in 1887 and the Barracks Building initiated that same year. The Barracks consisted of three levels of Tuscan columned verandas with a symmetrical arrangement, and the second level serving as Fleet Hospital (see also Rivett, 1999: 5-9). The building served as accommodation for crews on the Australia Station vessels. At this time the eastern seawall was two-thirds complete. Building works continued slowly and the Sail Loft and Rigging Shed was not formally acquired by the Admiralty until 1889. This followed years of debate over funding and negotiations with the NSW Government. Colonial Architect James Barnet was involved with drafting the plans for the Rigging Shed and Barracks Building.

A contract to build the urgently Naval Store was finally let on 26 July 1892 to Howie Brothers, after contracts were let in 1891, and the work was completed early in 1894 for a sum of £31,886. The building comprised a four-storey (semi-basement and three upper floors) late Victorian Warehouse of load-bearing polychrome bricks with sandstone string courses, cornices, sills, copings and granite thresholds to doors. The building is divided into five fire separated compartments by vertical cross walls. Within each section are two rows of circular cast iron columns supporting iron girders, timber joists and a 50mm tallowwood floor. The ground floor was paved with Val-de-Travers asphalt 38mm thick. Plan dimensions of the building are approximately 64m x 39m. The building is located next to the eastern side of Building 88. Lightly framed wrought iron roof trusses span between the masonry walls and support the roof. Originally corrugated galvanised iron, the roof has been corrugated asbestos cement and is currently zincalume.

To service the stores, five externally mounted wrought iron whips were provided above the large arched doorways on the northern side. Between these doorways and around the rest of the building are numerous windows of varying size. The timber framed double hung windows have two and four light sashes. In the centre of the northern and southern parapet, carved in sandstone is the royal cypher of Queen Victoria and the date 1893. The original water operated hydraulic plant consisted of engines, accumulators, five hoists (whips) and two lifts. The lifts have since been electrified with light motor rooms projecting above the roof level. The accumulator, originally planned to be located in Building 95 is now located in the western bay of Building 89. Additions (Buildings 87 and 90) have been constructed on the southern and eastern sides. Architectural Style: Victorian Warehouse.

Other building work included the semi-detached residences completed in 1896, the Barracks and Kitchen wing in 1889, the battery shed, factory and workshop in 1891, the naval stores complex in 1894, the main offices in 1895, further residences and the core shop in 1895, and the boat shed in 1896. That year saw the entire Garden Island depot completed and handed over to Rear Admiral Sir Cyprian Bridge, Commander-in-Chief, on behalf of the Admiralty. The Royal Australian Navy now finally had an established base.

=== Supporting the Australia Station, 1895–1914 ===
Consolidation of the base was a feature of this period with specialist staff brought out from England and labour recruited locally, including civilians. 1900 saw Australia's participation in the Boxer Rebellion, particularly the New South Wales Naval Brigade and the conversion to troopship at Garden Island of the steamship SS Salamis. 1901 saw the vessels and personnel from the former Colonial navies transferred to the Commonwealth on 1 March 1901 with the proclamation of the Australian Commonwealth. Australia signed the Naval Agreement with Britain in 1903 which continued Royal Navy vessels as part of the Australia Station, although supported with a financial subsidy.

Building work during this period included the construction of a Naval Prison with plans initially drawn up by the Colonial Architect back in 1888. The work was substantially complete by 1905. 1902 had seen part of the Sail Loft partitioned off to form a Naval Chapel, and various minor additions were added for this use, including a prisoners' gallery. The ownership question of Garden Island was raised again at the end of the decade with Britain's intention to withdraw vessels on the Australia Station due to the Australian Government's moves to determine its own naval policy. The NSW State Government believed the Commonwealth, once it took ownership, should pay it for the building works performed. The withdrawal of British fleet support for Australia was widely debated in the media at the time.

In 1908 the arrival of the US Great White Fleet caused alarm in Sydney due to its ability to surprise the local population. The Garden Island base was used to support the fleet of sixteen battleships during their week's stay. German strength in the Pacific raised further alarm and the Imperial Conference on Naval Affairs held in 1909 led the British to develop a Pacific Fleet, the Australian Station component being funded and manned entirely by Australia.

Garden Island was formally handed over from the British Admiralty to the Commonwealth Government in 1913 and coincided with the establishment of the first wholly owned and operated Royal Australian Navy. The island would become increasingly vital to maintain and support the vessels. This fleet was headed by the new Indefatigable-class battlecruiser HMAS Australia which was constructed from 1910 and arrived amidst much fanfare with other fleet units on 4 October 1913. Their entry to Port Jackson initiated the tradition of the naval fleet review. The fleet also comprised the light cruisers HMAS Sydney, HMAS Melbourne and the aging HMAS Encounter, the torpedo boat destroyers HMAS Parramatta, HMAS Warrego and HMAS Yarra, and the two submarines HMAS AE1 and HMAS AE2 (which did not arrive until 1914).

=== Operating a naval depot, 1914–1990 ===
During World War I (1914–1918) Garden Island was the principal naval asset for the fitting out and arming of transports and troopships. Some 79 vessels were refitted and repaired at the facility with 852 ship visits including service to Australian naval vessels, Royal Navy, and that of France and Japan. 1917 saw a major union dispute on the island which had a potential significant impact on war production and services. The dispute arose out of the introduction of the American "Taylor" system of job cards and involved much of the eastern states. The island played a unique part in naval history in 1914 when it served as the base of Australia's first submarine flotilla. HMAS AE1 and AE2, British E-class submarines, were based there until AE1 was lost near Rabaul in 1914 and AE2 famously near Gallipoli during the Dardanelles Campaign of 1915. These were also the first submarines in the Southern Hemisphere and attracted significant public attention.

The end of the war did not lead to an immediate downturn in work at Garden Island as the many merchant ships fitted out as troop ships had to be reconverted. However, from 1920 onwards, significant reduction in labour and reorganisation of the Dockyard to achieve efficiencies were a feature. A Royal Commission was established by the Commonwealth Government in 1921 to assess the needs and future uses of both the Garden Island facility and Cockatoo Island Dockyard, which always generated competing debate. The report concluded that there was insufficient work to keep both establishments fully employed and Cockatoo was transferred to the control of the Prime Minister's Department on 1 July 1921. The Royal Commission had the effect of restricting expansion or development at Garden Island which witnessed continued large staff reductions.

The 1920s-1930s was a volatile time for the security of naval control over Garden Island. Earlier debates about its ownership were reopened when, post-war, the New South Wales state government, through its Crown Lands Consolidation Act 1913, contended its rights over control. The state argued that the RAN's use of the island was inconsistent with the original 1865 and 1866 declarations which were for the purpose only of a naval depot for the Royal Navy. On 12 October 1923 the state government formally revoked the earlier dedications and by 1924 issued an ultimatum to the Commonwealth for possession of the island, or a declaration of that entitlement, plus claims for profits owed for its use. The High Court upheld the state's claim though severely criticised it for taken such actions.

The Commonwealth deferred any decision and by mid-1919 NSW Premier Jack Lang demanded payment for the island's use from October 1923 and a timeline for the Commonwealth abandonment of the site. A change of Federal Government stalled the issue further. The state's 1932 land valuation was contested and a recommendation made by the Department of Defence to buy the island outright for a reduced sum, partly due to the benefit the facility provided to the state in terms of labour, major works, and the associated facilities in Sydney Harbour that would close with the abandonment of Garden Island. As these debates continued the functioning efficiency of the island further dwindled with much of the machinery obsolete or worn out from wartime work. World economic downturn played a significant part as the Great Depression took hold.

Late 1930s world political events led to a re-assessment of the need for Australia's national naval defence and the importance of facilities such as Garden Island. A major obstacle was the lack of sufficient docking facilities for large capital ships, particularly the availability of a graving dock. In 1938, the Federal Cabinet approved, in principle, the construction of an Australian naval graving dock. 3 September 1939 saw Australia at war with Germany.

On 1 May 1940, Prime Minister Robert Menzies tabled plans for construction of the graving dock in parliament. As Tom Frame notes, construction of the graving dock and ancillary equipment such as cranes, "would be the greatest engineering feat in Australia's history, surpassing even the Sydney Harbour Bridge. It would involve the reclamation of thirty acres between Potts Point and Garden Island". Work on the graving dock commenced from 1940 to 1942 when work was undertaken night and day following the fall of Singapore and loss of facilities there. A special sandstone quarry was opened up at Balls Head to supply stone for the cofferdam. The dock gates, or caissons were designed by Vickers Armstrong in England and built by the Sydney Steel Company. They included steel capable of building a 10,000-short-ton (9,100 t) ship and were viewed as the most difficult welding project ever conducted in Australia up to that time.

World War II saw a reinstatement of the critical value of Garden Island to national defence and the facility immediately undertook extensive vessel repairs and modification work. The importance of the facility was demonstrated on 31 May 1942 when the Japanese Imperial Navy attacked Sydney Harbour with a fleet of five I-class ocean going submarines and three midget's. The principle targets were the heavy ships in port at that time, including the cruiser USS Chicago tied up at No.2 Buoy on the eastern side of Garden Island. While the raid was a failure with no significant losses, bar two of the midget submarines, the island Depot Ship, the ex-ferry HMAS Kuttabul, was destroyed by torpedo alongside Garden Island, killing 21 sailors. The importance of this tragedy is remembered with a commemorative plaque on the eastern side of Garden Island, annual commemoration ceremonies at that historic spot and the naming of the HMAS Kuttabul base.

The Dutch submarine K-IX was also damaged by the explosion while a second torpedo ran ashore on the island and failed to explode. Dockyard Torpedo Depot staff undertook the dangerous disarming task. 1944 was a significant year with the Commonwealth Government formally acquiring Garden Island from the New South Wales Government for £600,000 after having resumed the land under wartime regulations in 1939. The graving dock was by this time almost complete. On 2 March 1945 the British aircraft carrier HMS Illustrious required urgent repairs and entered the dock three weeks prior to its opening. Officially opened on 24 March 1945, the dock was named in honour of Captain James Cook RN, with the celebratory ribbon cut by the bow of the frigate HMAS Lachlan. By war's end, the dock had accommodated some of the most famous British battleships and carriers, HMS Indomitable, HMS Duke of York, HMS Implacable, HMS Indefatigable, HMS King George V, Illustrious and HMS Formidable, and serviced its largest guest, the battleship HMS HMS Anson of 45,360 short tons (41,150 t). Post World War II, industrial relations issues came to the fore between dockyard workers and managers.

The 1975 formal recognition of the Garden Island Combined Union Shop Committee (CUSC) representing 13 unions, provided a level of stability. In March 1977, then Minister for Defence, James Killen, announced a planning team to examine the modification of the Dockyard and Fleet Base. Apart from efficiencies of space and traffic movement, the plan sought to address the need to retain and preserve historic buildings and artefacts on site. The modernisation program was completed in mid-1990, transforming the appearance of the base.

The importance of Garden Island rose from 1987 when then Minister for Defence, Kim Beazley announced the Hawke government's intention to sell its interest in the Williamstown Dockyard, Cockatoo Island (other than for submarine refit), while the State Dockyard at Newcastle was also to go. This activity was in part to pay for a huge fleet modernisation program including the purchase of the Collins-class submarines and Anzac-class frigates. In 1988 the Hawke government corporatised Garden Island into the new Commonwealth-owned company, Australian Defence Industries (ADI). Garden Island became the only Government-owned and operated dockyard in Australia, and was set on a cost-recovery basis, including provision for undertaking commercial contracts.

==== Hammerhead Crane associated with the Captain Cook Dock ====
On part of the reclaimed land there is a 115.8-metre-long (380 ft) dock and a complex of buildings on the western side of Garden Island and on the eastern edge of Woolloomooloo Bay. The crane occupies a length of 52.1 metres (171 ft) on the fitting out wharf about two thirds along the Captain Cook Dock, beyond the boundary of Garden Island itself. Although the crane is incorporated into the wharf, it is disconnected from it by expansion joints on either side of its abutment with the wharf. The Hammerhead Crane has dominated the skyline since it was built. In 1966 the crane was the largest crane in the southern hemisphere and remains the largest dockside crane in Australia. Like the dockyard itself, it was engineered to the extremes of likely demand and represented the contingency approach to naval support planning in the aftermath of the two World Wars. Tenders for the crane were called in 1944 and construction occurred 1944–51.

The Sydney Steel Company was contracted to fabricate and erect the crane to the design of Sir William Arrol, with Sir Alexander Gibb and Partners as consultants. All mechanical and electrical equipment came from England and all structural steelwork was fabricated and erected by the Sydney Steel Company. The crane's main function was the removal and refitting of gun turrets to warships. It was last used in 1988 for heavy lifting of power station stators (the cores of electrical generators). Upon completion in February 1952, the New South Wales Minister for Works, Joseph Cahill, drove in the final rivet to complete the edifice. According to an undated brochure published by the RAN, the hammerhead crane first came into use in March 1951. According to the specification, all fabricated steelwork had to be assembled and then trial erected to check the faring of holes and camber of booms. At the time of trial erection of the cantilever and during preliminary checking for camber, it was found impracticable to build the cantilever the right way up as this would have necessitated a great deal of shoring because the jib tapered from 11.28 metres (37.0 ft) in the centre to 4.6 metres (15 ft) at the nose. It was then decided to build the cantilever upside down as the top chord only had a camber of 20.7 cm (8.5/32in).

Pre-cast concrete blocks were placed at each panel to give the correct camber and trial erection then proceeded satisfactorily: all splices being 60% pinned and bolted using parallel pins so as not to damage the holes. After the trial erection ended, the structure was dismantled and transported to the site for final erection. Work commenced on the foundation cylinders in August 1944 (each of the four cylinders were named (A to D). In March 1945 the precast sections B and D each weighing 146.8 tonnes (161.8 short tons) were lifted and placed in their prepared guides using the floating crane Titan. They proved watertight but were extremely lively in the water, the slightest wash from a passing launch causing them to strike heavily against their staging. Work on the foundations continued but water penetration of cylinders A and C became a concern caused by general seepage and then by small leaks.

By 19 August 1946, the Engineer in Chief reported: "Water was coming in fairly rapidly" and on 24 August two divers worked in relays plugging the leak, but the depth was great and the job was not successful. Divers working in 31.4 metres (103 ft) of water could only generally work for a total time of 2 hours 50 minutes in tw

The main use of the crane has been in the removal and refitting of gun turrets. The crane comprises an asymmetric horizontal steel boom, radius 40 metres (130 ft), swiveling on a square section 68-metre (223 ft) steel tower. The maximum lift is 227 tonnes (250 short tons), although a subsidiary crane on the boom is able to lift up to five tonnes (six short tons). The 227-tonne (250-short-ton) crane has been decommissioned.

== Description ==
The precinct consists of Garden Island, the tip of Potts Point, the reclaimed area linking the island and the point, and part of the eastern shoreline of Woolloomooloo Bay. The island and the point are high points above sea level of the drowned river valley that now forms Sydney Harbour, which was itself formed between 10,000 and 6,500 years ago as sea levels rose following the last glaciation. The island and point are essentially composed of sandstone, and in 1788 were both vegetated with low coastal heath and woodland formations. The island had hummocks at its north (24metres high) and south (20 metres) ends, with a lower flat between them until substantial re-forming began in 1885 as part of the development of the naval base. The narrow strait between the island at the mainland was filled in during World War Two to provide further naval facilities, notably a graving dock, and all of the shorelines in the precinct have been substantially covered and reshaped by the construction of seawalls, docks and other facilities since the 1880s.

Most buildings in the Precinct were built in the 1880s and 1890s. The Captain Cook Graving Dock was built during World War II, linking the Island to the mainland. Of further interest and worth are sandstone carvings of 1788, the Signal Station and the Royal Australian Navy Historical Collection.

The timber figurehead of Queen Victoria is off the clipper ship Windsor Castle, which was launched in 1869, and was carved to represent Queen Victoria dressed in regalia. When the ship was sold to become a coal hulk in Sydney Harbour, its master Captain William Cargill put the figurehead in the garden of his house. Discovered years later by Dr C Morris, who presented it to Garden Island. It also features a carved timber figurehead of a woman from the clipper ship Consuela, built in 1880s and which traded to Australia, which is on display for public viewing.

The Small Dockyard Steam Crane designed for operation on railway lines similar to those once used on the railways system.

=== Individual buildings ===
==== Secretariat ====
The Secretariat is a three storeyed Victorian Georgian stuccoed brick building moulded to simulate sandstone, hipped slate roof built in 1887. Three storey verandah to three sides supported on cast iron pillars imported from Britain and also support upper floors of interior. Designed as barracks by Barnet. Essentially colonial Georgian design; twelve pane windows and four panel doors. Were large coolrooms underneath, now distilled water plant. Kitchen block: built of brick, stuccoed to represent stone, slate roof, small pane windows.

==== Rigging Shed and Naval Chapel ====
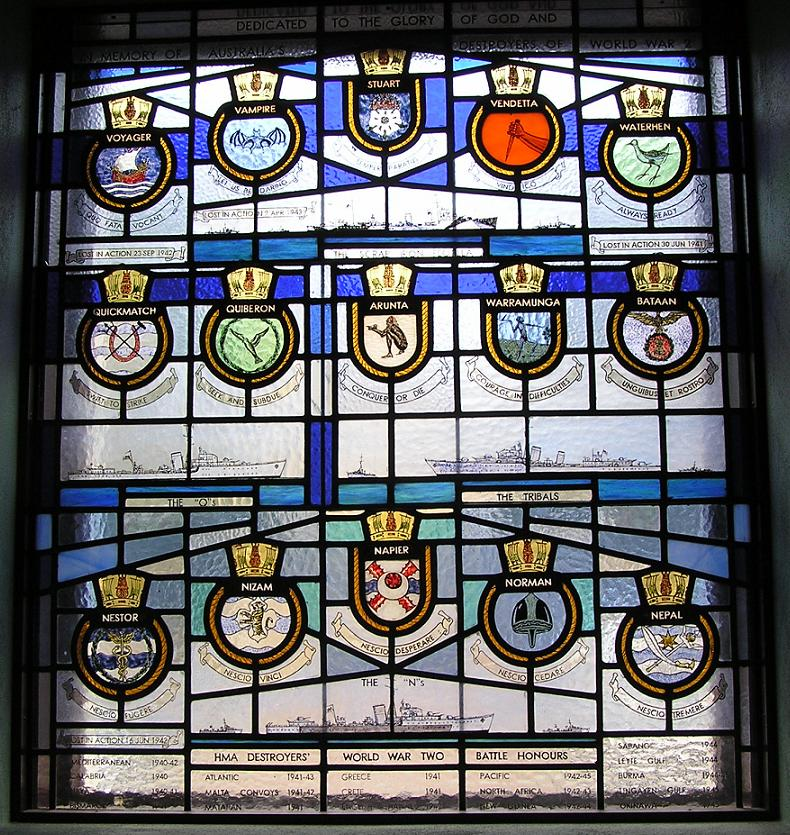
Stained glass window in the Naval Chapel, pictured in 2006.

Separately-listed on the Commonwealth Heritage List, the Rigging Shed and Naval Chapel is a two-storey Victorian Italianate stuccoed brick building having stone sills, arches and columns, with original timber beams replaced by steel. It was originally built as a rigging shed based on 1790 Admiralty plans. It is the oldest building on the island. The sail loft was converted into a chapel in 1902, with stained glass windows installed from the original chapel, which had been built in 1891. The original loft floor of timber remains caulked with oakum and bitumen, access being by exterior timber stairs. Facades have recessed bays. The Chapel incorporates a unique stained glass commemorative window to Australia's first two submarines, AE1 and AE2, based at the Island and lost at Rabaul (1914) and near Gallipoli (1915) respectively.

The facades have recessed bays with small arched windows and large doorways with timber sliding doors. Walls are brick, stuccoed and ruled to resemble ashlar stonework. The roof has a double hipped form and, originally clad with corrugated iron, was re-clad with corrugated asbestos and has since returned to corrugated iron; there are raised central ridge lights. An arched brick spine wall helps support the first floor, which is also supported by rolled and wrought iron girders. The timber floor of the first floor is still caulked with oakham and bitumen. Windows are double-hung sashes, with six panes to each sash. Parts of the hoisting facilities remain. The chapel features polished cedar furnishings and joinery, mosaics, memorial plaques, stained glass windows commemorating RAN ships and personnel, and a pulpit in the shape of a ship's bow. External stairs were added when the chapel was made, and in about 1980 two spiral staircases were added to the building. A mezzanine floor has been added to the southern end. Slipways to the eastern side have gone, although bollards and mooring rings remain.

The building, owing to its style and materials, contributes to the visual amenity of the nineteenth century group of buildings at Garden Island and is a waterside feature in the precinct. It is similar in scale, form and design to other buildings, such as the Factory.

==== Hill Road residences ====
The Hill Road Residences are a group of two brick buildings of two storeys, of the maisonette type, built in 1900 as married officer's quarters. Queen Anne style with shingled timber corner balconies and terracotta tiled roofs. Central stuccoed brick core has large batten and rough cast gable with decorative barge board. Some verandahs and balconies have been filled in.

==== Office building ====
The Office building is a two-storey Victorian Italianate building built to Admiralty plans, built in 1890 based on 1790 standard designs. Original section of pale brickwork with sandstone trims and clock tower surmounted by a cupola. The clock mechanism of pulleys and weights, and a differential turning all four sets of hands, is rare. The hipped roof is clad with tiles (originally slate). Windows are double-hung sashes and are arched. There is fine cedar joinery internally, a fine internal staircase, and etched entrance glass featuring Australian flora. Internal walls are rendered in ashlar imitation. Side wings added in 1920s.

==== Hammerhead Crane ====
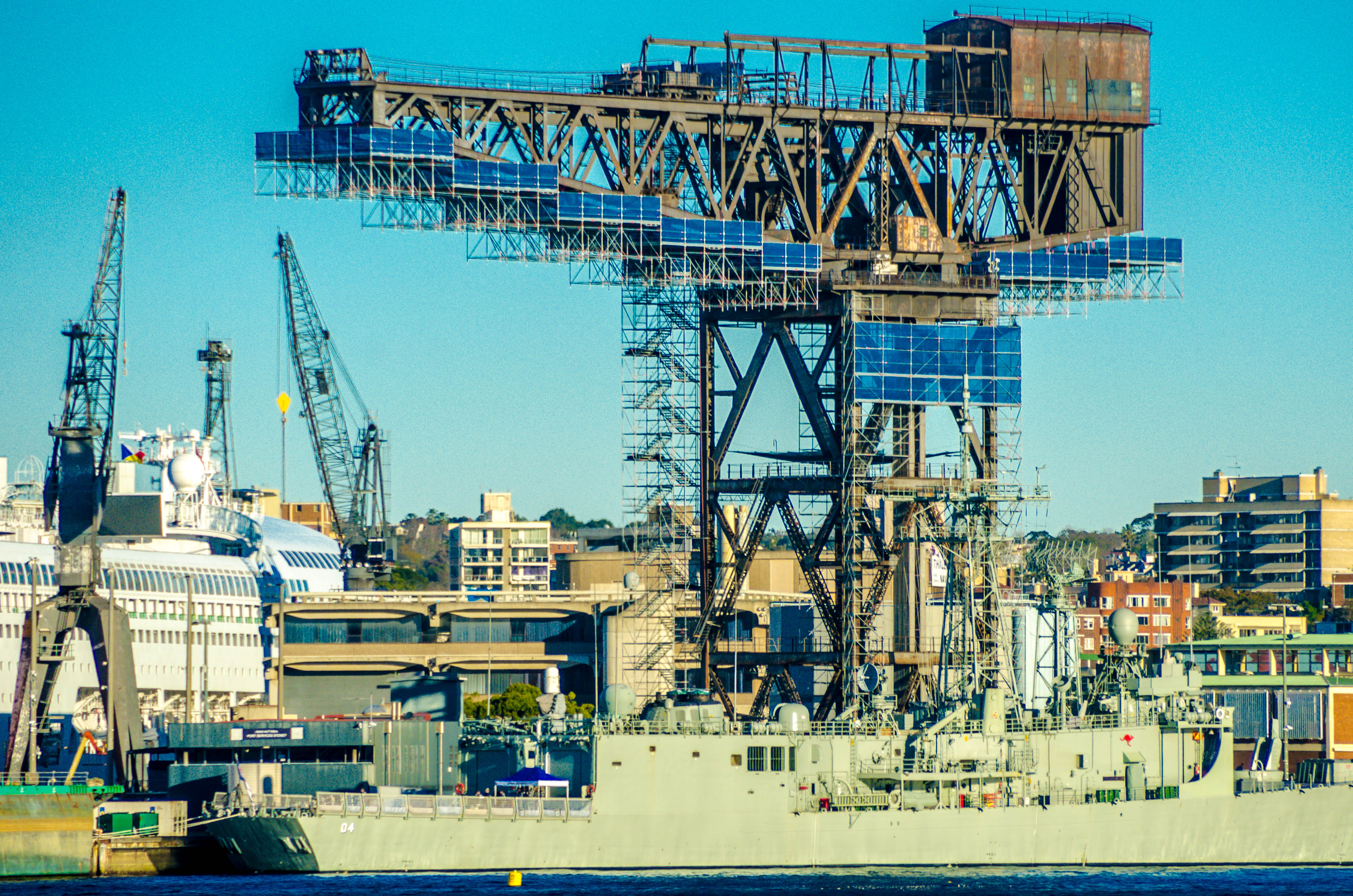
The hammerhead crane prior to removal, 2013

The Hammerhead Crane consists of an asymmetric horizontal steel truss boom 83 metres (272 ft) long, with a maximum radius of 40 metres (130 ft), swivelling on a square section steel truss tower 15.2-metre (50 ft) square, a height of 68 metres (223 ft) from wharf level to top of the cantilever. The main machinery house is situated on top of the boom, making the total height of the complete structure 61.9 metres (203 ft) from wharf level. Foundations consist of four main concrete bases 39.3 metres (129 ft) deep and 30.5 metres (100 ft) below the low water level being 4.6 metres (15 ft) in diameter, taken down to the rock bed. The maximum lift of the crane is 254 tonnes (280 short tons) when the two main purchase hooks are coupled. All crane motors and swivelling gear are electrically driven. The two main purchase hooks are each powered by 90-horsepower (67 kW) motors (maximum 1,000 revolutions variation to 100 revolutions minimum) with automatically adjusting brush gear for speed control. Combined, the provide a lift of 254 tonnes (280 short tons) operated by one lever, a 40.6-tonne (44.8-short-ton) auxiliary hook powered by a 90-horsepower (67 kW) motor is also part of the lifting capacity of the crane. A 10.16-tonne (11.20-short-ton) capacity hook for handling lifting gear and other items is also available and there is also a 6.1-tonne (6.7-short-ton) travelling crane in the main machine house used for maintenance purposes. When tested initially after completion, the maximum test load was 317.5 tonnes (350.0 short tons) lifted, lowered and controlled. Steel wire used in the mains sections totalled 1,422 tonnes (1,567 short tons), apart from the 71.12 tonnes (78.40 short tons) of electrical gear used. The top of the tower is formed by four 20.32-tonne (22.40-short-ton) main girders. Approximately 250,000 rivets were used in construction.

==== Battery Shop ====
The Battery Shop is a single storey brick building stuccoed to represent stone. Built in 1880 to Admiralty plans of 1790 as a chain and cable store. Facades are divided up into uniform recessed bays within which are arched openings. Some are small-paned windows at the upper level as original but most of the doorways are now bricked up. Simple hipped roof now sheeted with asbestos cement.

==== Factory ====
The Factory is a two-storey stuccoed brick and stone building built as a factory for fitting out warships, built in 1887 based upon Admiralty plans of 1790. Doors and windows have round headed arches while the asbestos cement roof is in the form of a series of hips with ridge lights. A two-storey single gabled section to the north was devoted to making spars and masts.

==== Naval Store ====
Separately-listed on the Commonwealth Heritage List, the Naval Store is a large victualling store constructed in 1893 to an Admiralty design, of polychrome bricks brought from Britain. With sandstone string courses, cornices, sills, granite thresholds to doors. Of three storeys and semi-basement with parapet to the roof, the northern fourth floor never having been completed. Otherwise remains in near original condition. Floors are tallowwood, supported by cast iron columns (the ground floor is asphalt). Remaining in the building are elements of the former water-operated hydraulic hoist system, including the hoists or whips, the accumulator and there are two lifts which have been electrified. This hoist system is the most intact of its type surviving in NSW.

==== Naval Garden ====
The Naval Garden has been described as one of the last large garden areas on Garden Island and appears to be one of the last "naval style" gardens in Australia – relating in spirit to the garden at Admiralty House, Kirribilli. Much nature planting survives on the northwest corner of the site including a large fig tree, a clipped olive hedge, and plantings of aspidistra, hydrangea etc. Initials carved by seamen of the Sirius in 1788 survive on sandstone formations; cannon from HMS Sirius are displayed in an appropriate naval style together with other mementos brought back by captains. The white painted galvanised iron railings, although crude and recent, are a valid naval style treatment. 20th-century sandstone terracing provides a traditional display of garden flowers and is sympathetic to the naval character of the garden.

==== Other notable buildings ====
- Buildings 16–20 were built as Residences in 1894–95 (three residences in one building, two in the other). The buildings have remained in use as residences throughout their life.
- Building 88 was erected during 1889–91 as the Chain and Anchor Store, again designed by Barnet with Admiralty plans. By the early 1990s it was the sheet metal workshop.
- Building 95 was built as the Engineers Shop 1889–91, designed by Barnet. An extension housing a foundry and other works was added in 1892. The building has retained its workshop function.
- Building 99 was erected as a Spar Shed and Dining Room at the same time as Building 95 and is used as a workshop today.

Other historic buildings include Buildings 21 and 22, built as Overseers' Cottages in 1885–86 and designed by Barnet. These are now the oldest extant buildings on the island and are still in residential use. Building 9 was erected as an additional Office Building in 1895–96 and retains the office function. The Boatshed (Building 25) dates from 1896 and was prefabricated in England; a slipway was built nearby. A provisions pit, excavated for the secure storage of food and supplies, dates from 1885. The Tennis Court Pavilion dates from about 1907 and, with the courts, shows that there was a recreational aspect to the island lifestyle. Also on the northern end of the island are naval gardens dating from about the 1880s.

Retaining walls and sea walls were built in the 1880s and 1890s. Dating from the same period are the remains of the Goods Tramway built to transport light goods between wharves, stores and workshops. It was disused by the time of the Second World War. Dating from either 1919–20 or 1923 is the Gun Mounting Store which has retained gun functions as well as other uses. The Lime Store (Building 98, now Core Shop) was most likely built in 1927; it has been used as stables in the past. Built in about 1930 is the Signal Station (Building 13) which was used in connection with navigation of vessels on Sydney Harbour. Various wharves are in the precinct, including the Cruiser Wharf, built prior to 1912, the Oil Wharf dating from just before the Second World War and the Oil Tank just up the hill, built in 1916 when oil was starting to replace coal as fuel, the Gun Wharf (1920s), and the East Dock Wharf built at the same time as the Captain Cook Graving Dock. A tunnel system, with its own power supply, was excavated under the northern hill of the island during the Second World War and was modified in the 1960s–70s.

=== Modifications and dates ===
- 1885 – removal of southern hummock of Garden Island.
- 1942 – Captain Cook Graving Dock built and island connected to mainland.

== Heritage listing ==
As at 30 June 2004, Garden Island Naval Precinct is of state significance for the role played by the Royal Navy and then the Royal Australian Navy in the development and growth of Sydney as an imperial and then as a global city. It has long associations with victualling and repairing naval vessels and other similar maritime defence activities. Garden Island, in particular, is significant as a place of the earliest contacts between Aboriginal people and colonists, and is important in the course of introducing and establishing European gardening and cultivation techniques and food plant species. The precinct is important in understanding the patterns of recreational use in the harbour and the development of a harbourside public domain. The precinct has important associations with historically significant people, notably king Bungaree, Governor Lachlan Macquarie, Commodore Loring, Rear Admiral Tyron, and Colonial Architect James Barnet. The precinct provides ample evidence of the technological innovations in the design and construction of machinery for the specialised needs of maintaining naval vessels. The whole precinct makes a notable contribution to the characteristic beauty of Sydney Harbour and retains a sense of being a low-lying island set against the high-rise Sydney CBD. Significant associations have long existed between the precinct and RN and RAN personnel on active service and in retirement. The precinct retains an ability to yield significant archaeological evidence, both maritime and terrestrial, on the settlement of Sydney and the development of naval facilities. The precinct is rare as the only example of a fleet base in New South Wales, and illustrates the combination of industrial, military and recreational uses that have characterised the shores and islands of Sydney Harbour since 1788.

Garden Island Precinct was listed on the New South Wales State Heritage Register on 12 November 2004 having satisfied the following criteria.

The place is important in demonstrating the course, or pattern, of cultural or natural history in New South Wales.

Garden Island Naval Precinct is of state significance for its ability to demonstrate the importance of the Royal Navy and the Royal Australian Navy to the development of Sydney as an imperial and later a global city. Garden Island has long been associated with maritime activities such as victualling and repairing naval vessels, and with the building and operation of harbourside defences. The precinct is significant in the course of NSW history for its role since the 1880s as the most important fleet base in Australia. The precinct is also significant as a place of the earliest contacts between Aboriginal people and colonists, with a very early armed encounter taking place on the island in 1789. The island is significant in the course of establishing European gardening techniques and methods in Australia by trial and error. The precinct, and the island in particular, are important in the patterns of recreational use of, and public campaigns for increasing public access to, Sydney Harbour as part of the public domain.

The place has a strong or special association with a person, or group of persons, of importance of cultural or natural history of New South Wales's history.

Garden Island Naval Precinct is of state significance for its associations with significant people and groups, notably with the Cadigal people for whom the island was part of their country; with king Bungaree the "King of Sydney", maritime explorer and probably first Aboriginal person to travel right around the continental coastlines, who specifically asked to die there; with Governor Macquarie who first brought the island into the public domain; with Commordore James Loring, the first commander of the Royal Navy establishment at Garden Island; with Colonial Architect James Barnet who designed many of the precinct's buildings; and with Rear Admiral Sir George Tyron, first commander in chief of the Australia station of the Royal Navy whose appointment to the Garden Island raised the status of the Australia station to that of a flag rank in 1885.

The place is important in demonstrating aesthetic characteristics and/or a high degree of creative or technical achievement in New South Wales.

Garden Island Naval Precinct is of state significance for the technical innovation it can demonstrate in the naval machinery designed and constructed for the specialised maintenance of navy vessels; and for its contribution to the beauty and characteristic qualities of Sydney Harbour as a low, bulbous headland projecting into the blue waters of the harbour, with a collection of low scale, late Victorian naval buildings lying just above a shoreline entirely skirted by sea walls and docks, beneath the towering, skeletal frame of the Hammerhead Crane watching over it all, and edged by an ever-changing variety of naval vessels, all set against a backdrop of the late 20th century high rise of Sydney CBD forming a harbourscape of unparalleled aesthetic qualities.

The place has a strong or special association with a particular community or cultural group in New South Wales for social, cultural or spiritual reasons.

Garden Island Precinct has special associations with personnel of the Royal Australian Navy who have served there, and who maintain contact with the place through the location of the headquarters of associations for former personnel.

The place has potential to yield information that will contribute to an understanding of the cultural or natural history of New South Wales.

Sydney Harbour Naval Precinct is of state significance for its ability to yield information about the earliest period of colonial settlement in Australia and as a benchmark site for the study of naval facilities on the east coast. The precinct, although subject to disturbance especially during the building of the graving dock, retains potential for maritime archaeological remains associated with the early wharf and jetty facilities, and depositional material from the shore and fleet units.

The place possesses uncommon, rare or endangered aspects of the cultural or natural history of New South Wales.

Sydney Harbour Naval Precinct is rare at the state level as the only example in New South Wales of a Royal Australian Navy Fleet Base, and as a naval facility that has been in almost continual use for defence purposes since 1788.

The place is important in demonstrating the principal characteristics of a class of cultural or natural places/environments in New South Wales.

Sydney Harbour Naval Precinct is representative of the ways in which the islands and headlands of Sydney Harbour have been used for industrial and military purposes during the late colonial and 20th century periods, and is illustrative of the debates about recreational use of the harbour's isles and foreshores during the early colonial and later 20th century periods.

== See also ==
- Naval Base Sydney
- Royal Australian Navy Heritage Centre
