= Court of Civil Jurisdiction =

The Court of Civil Jurisdiction was a court established in the late 18th century, in the colony of New South Wales which subsequently became a state of Australia. The court had jurisdiction to deal with all civil disputes in the then fledgling colony. It was in operation between 1788, the date of establishment of the new colony, and 1814.

== Background ==
The British government established the colony of New South Wales primarily as a penal colony with the intention of encouraging later settlement. The colony's principal purpose was to house prisoners from Great Britain. Captain Arthur Phillip was appointed as the colony's first governor.

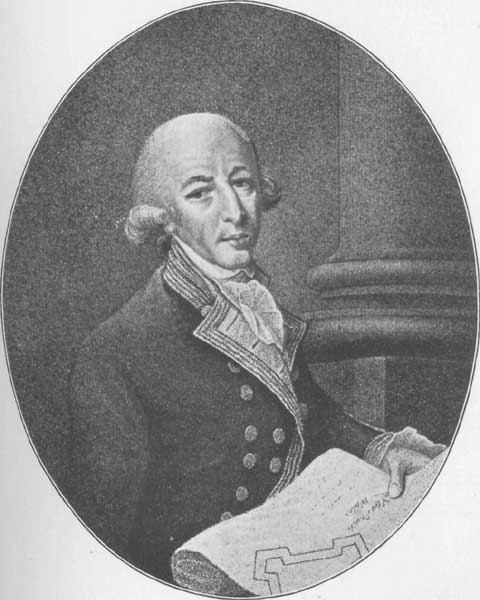
Arthur Phillip

The British authorities foresaw the need for a judicial system to be established in the colony to deal with civil matters. This was to be the present court, styled as the "Court of Civil Jurisdiction", and established by a charter, as well a Court of Vice-Admiralty pursuant to letters from the High Admiralty in Great Britain. In time, the colony would take to authorising justices of the peace to determine smaller debt claims that were taking up the time of these original civil courts established. The institution of these first courts in the then fledgling colony were important first steps in establishment of the rule of law in Australia.

== Constitution ==
The court was created by the First Charter of Justice, issued by King George III in the form of letters patent dated 2 April 1787. The Court of Civil Jurisdiction as established by the Charter was composed of the Deputy Judge Advocate of New South Wales, who was commonly known in the colony as the "judge-advocate", and two other persons appointed to the court by the Governor of New South Wales. The judge-advocate was the presiding officer. The court had jurisdiction to hear and determine summarily actions relating to land, houses, debt, contract, trespass, and most other common law or equitable cases of any amount.

The court was abolished by the Second Charter of Justice, issued on 4 February 1814; it was replaced by the Supreme Court of Civil Judicature.

== Judge advocate ==
The first deputy judge-advocate was David Collins who held office from 1788 until 1796. He was temporarily replaced by Richard Bowyer Atkins until Richard Dore arrived in 1798.

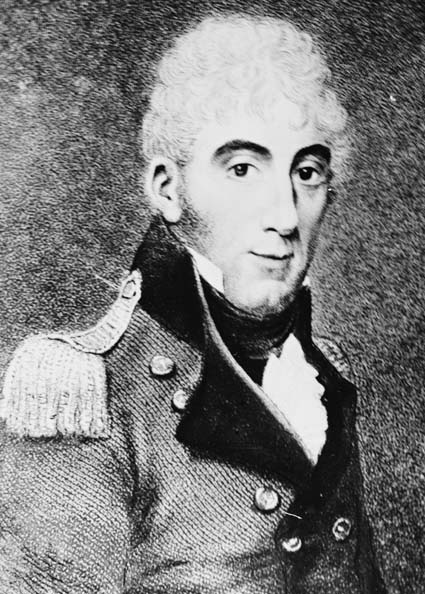
David Collins

Dore was the first judge-advocate with legal qualifications. He died in 1800. Atkins was re-appointed and held office until late 1809, although he was temporarily deposed during the Rum Rebellion of 1808. At the end of 1809, Ellis Bent, a barrister, arrived from England to take up the appointment as judge-advocate. He held the office until his death on 10 November 1815 and was the last judge-advocate to preside in the court before it was abolished when it was replaced by the Supreme Court of Civil Judicature, the Governors Court and Lieutenant Governor's Court.

== Case procedure ==
=== Commencing cases ===
A case was commenced by a complaint made in writing by the plaintiff. After lodging it with the judge advocate, the judge advocate would issue a warrant to the provost marshal stating the substance of the complaint. The provost marshal would then summon the defendant to appear before the court. If the amount in dispute exceeded £10, the provost marshal was directed to bring the defendant personally into court. The defendant could instead provide bail for his or her appearance. In the latter case, the defendant was required to find security for the amount of the judgment and deliver it to the provost marshal.

=== Procedure in court ===
Proceedings would begin with the judge advocate administering an oath to each of the other officers of the court appointed by the governor for that sitting. The officers after having been sworn would then swear in the judge advocate. Witnesses on either side, but not the parties themselves were sworn and examined. This was common practice in English courts at the time. The evidence of the witnesses was taken down in writing and signed by them. After all the evidence was given, the court would consider its judgment. The court's judgment was given "according to justice and right" and sometimes not according to the existing common law or the law on equity. For example, the first case before the court Cable v Sinclair involved two ex-convicts suing a master of a ship for loss of luggage. Under English law at the time, a criminal would be unable to sue in a court of law. However, the court in this case overlooked that and gave judgment in favour of the convicts.

=== After judgment ===
If a plaintiff was successful before the court, the plaintiff could obtain a warrant of execution against the defendant's goods and chattels (called fieri facias). This in effect allowed the provost marshal to seize the defendant's goods and sell them, subsequently paying the proceeds to the plaintiff. Alternatively, the defendant could be imprisoned until the debt and costs were satisfied. As in English law, the plaintiff was required to maintain the debtor in prison by paying what was called groats. The defendant could say on oath that he had no means of maintaining himself in prison. If this occurred, the plaintiff had to provide maintenance for him in prison according to the order of the Court. If the amount ordered by the court was not paid for one week, the debtor could be discharged from prison and also discharged from the debt.

=== Appeals ===
There was a right of appeal to the governor from a decision of the court. An appeal had to be lodged with the governor within eight days of the decision of the court. The governor sat on appeal with the judge advocate as an advisor.

If the appellant was unsuccessful before the governor and the amount involved exceeded £300 sterling, the unsuccessful appellant might go further by appealing to the British Privy Council. An appeal in that case had to be lodged within fourteen days. Only one recorded appeal from this court was heard by the Privy Council.

== Notable cases ==
The first civil case under English law in Australia was Cable v Sinclair, heard on 1 July 1788. David Collins was presiding as judge-advocate with the Reverend Richard Johnson and John White appointed as the other members of the court. The case concerned the loss of baggage on the voyage of the First Fleet from England to Botany Bay and Port Jackson, now known as Sydney. After hearing evidence, the court found in favour of the plaintiff and awarded damages against the ship's master. Bruce Kercher notes that this decision goes against the then English principles of law relating to "convict attaint" which provides that a prisoner under sentence of death was unable to sue or hold property. Henry and Susannah Cable both were sentenced to death but had their sentence commuted to transportation, so under law, they were not entitled to sue. Its other important cases are online.

== Legality ==
The legal status of the court has been debated. Under English law at the time, the monarch could only establish common law courts in settled lands, which the English had considered the colony of New South Wales to be. However, equitable and other types of courts could not be established except by an Act of Parliament made by the Imperial Parliament of Great Britain. This position was recognised by the Supreme Court of New South Wales in 1832 in Harris v. Riley [1832] NSWSupC 76 when the court under Chief Justice Francis Forbes held that the Court of Civil Jurisdiction did not have an equitable jurisdiction and that the decision of the court in that particular case was void.

== Abolition ==
The court had outlived its original purpose by the early 19th century. There was a growing clamour in the colony for a legally qualified judge to head the superior court of the colony. The settlement in Van Diemen's Land was also not being properly serviced by the court as the court sat only in Sydney. The court was loath to undertake the long journey to Hobart to conduct sittings.

Recommendations had been made by Ellis Bent to the British authorities along those lines for reform of the courts in the colony. In 1814, the British sovereign established three new courts to replace the court. These were the Supreme Court of Civil Judicature, the Governors Court and the Lieutenant Governor's Court. The court ceased sitting in 1814 as a result of the revocation of its charter.

== Sources ==
- History of New South Wales From the Records, Volume 1 – Governor Phillip 1783–1789 by George B Barton – Published 1889
- Alex Castles, An Australian Legal History, Law Book Co, 1975.
- Watkin Tench, A Complete Account of the Colony of New South Wales, https://www.gutenberg.org/ebooks/3534
- David Collins, An Account of the English Colony in New South Wales, Volume 1, With Remarks on the Dispositions, Customs, Manners, Etc. of The Native Inhabitants of That Country. to Which Are Added, Some Particulars of New Zealand https://www.gutenberg.org/ebooks/12565
- Bruce Kercher, Debt, Seduction and other Disasters: the Birth of Civil Law in Convict New South Wales, Federation Press, 1996.
