= Jeffrey Bent =

Jeffrey Bent may refer to:

- Jeffery Hart Bent (1781–1852), first judge in New South Wales, Australia
- Geoff Bent (1932–1958), English footballer who died in the Munich air disaster
