= Lieutenant Governor's Court =

The Lieutenant Governor's Court was a court established in the early 19th century in the colony of Van Diemen's Land which subsequently became Tasmania, a state of Australia. The court had jurisdiction to deal with civil disputes where the amount in dispute was not more than £50 sterling in the colony. The establishment of the court was the first practical civil court in the settlement. This was an important first step in improving the resolution of civil disputes in the settlement. The Supreme Court of Van Diemen's Land eventually replaced it in 1823 when the court's charter was revoked by the Third Charter of Justice.

== Background ==
The British government established the colony of New South Wales primarily as a penal colony with the intention of encouraging later settlement. Captain Arthur Phillip was appointed as the colony's first governor and did much to ensure the colony of New South Wales survived and transformed into a modern colonial outpost.

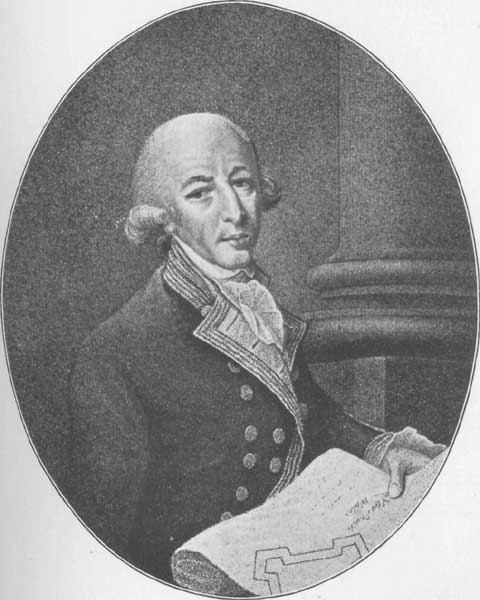
Arthur Phillip

Phillip's commission extended his authority from the top of Australia to the bottom of Tasmania plus islands to the east of New South Wales.

Soon after the commencement of the New South Wales colony, Phillip was directed to commence a colony at Norfolk Island. Later, Governor Philip Gidley King was ordered to found a colony in Van Diemen's Land to prevent the French from laying claim to it. In 1803, King choose Lieutenant John Bowen, a British soldier to start the colony. Bowen chose Risdon Cove on the eastern shore of the River Derwent in the south-east for the first settlement of Europeans. In 1804 Lieutenant-governor David Collins moved the settlement across the river and Hobart was founded. The beginnings of the colony as a penal colony were hard. Food was in short supply and convicts had to be disciplined. Nevertheless, it soon prospered particularly with whaling and the release of convicts into the community who had served their time. With the increased prosperity came the need for better access to forms of civil justice. The British authorities foresaw the need for a civil judicial system to be established in the colony of New South Wales. A court styled the “Court of Civil Jurisdiction” was established by the First Charter of Justice as well a Court of Vice-Admiralty pursuant to letters from the High Admiralty in Great Britain. This court was a failure for the settlement in Van Diemen's Land as the court would not sit outside Sydney. Litigants had to make an arduous journey to Sydney by boat to prosecute their case. The introduction of the Lieutenant Governor's Court was the first step in providing adequate access to justice in the settlement.

== Constitution ==
The court was created by Letters Patent dated 4 February 1814 issued by King George III the reigning sovereign of England of the time. The court was styled the “Lieutenant Governor’s Court” pursuant to the patent. It was composed of a deputy judge-advocate for Van Diemen's Land, who was commonly known as the “judge-advocate”, and two other persons inhabiting the island appointed by the Lieutenant Governor of Van Diemen's Land. The judge-advocate was the presiding officer. The lieutenant governor was not actually involved in the operation of the court nor did he preside as its head. The court could also sit with only two members, but in that case, one of those members had to be the judge advocate. The court had jurisdiction hear and determine summarily actions relating to land, houses, debt, contract, trespass, and just about any other common law or equitable case up to £50 sterling. The cause of action had to arise in the island of Van Diemen's Land. The court was abolished in 1823 when it was replaced by the Supreme Court of Van Diemen's Land established by Letters Patents dated 13 October 1823. The letters were authorised by the British Parliament through the passing of the New South Wales Act 1823 (UK). The abolition was on the recommendation of Commissioner John Bigge who was appointed by the British authorities to inquire into the state of the New South Wales colony.

== Sittings of the court ==
Edward Abbott, the first “Tasmanian” judge-advocate, arrived in Hobart in February 1815. His arrival meant that it was technically possible for the court to sit in early 1815. This was not to be, as his formal appointment had not arrived, so he could not be sworn into the office. In April, Lieutenant-Governor Thomas Davey proclaimed martial law which further delayed Abbott's swearing in. Abbott returned to Sydney to collect documents concerning his court. He returned to Hobart in November and in December opened the court for sitting. Governor of New South Wales, Lachlan Macquarie, did not think that Abbott was up to the task of running the court. However, Abbott proved to be the right man for the position at the time. Whilst he had a small knowledge of the law, he simplified procedure, reduced fees, and proceeded by common sense rather than legal niceties. Royal Commissioner Bigge contrasted the operation of this court with the Governors Court in Sydney and found that Abbott's court operated more efficiently and effectively than the Sydney-based court.

== Appeals ==
There was no right of appeal from decisions of the court. This was in contrast to the situation with the Supreme Court of Civil Judicature where there was a right of appeal to the governor sitting as a court of appeal, with a possible further right of appeal to the Privy Council. The report by the Select Committee of the House of Commons recommended that it was inappropriate for an appeal to be available for the amounts of money involved in proceedings before these types of courts. In general, the court was expected to operate in the same manner as a Court of Requests.

== Problems with the court ==
The court did not sit at Launceston, much to the displeasure of those residents and to the disapproval of Bigge. However, this was much preferable to not having a court at all, or having to travel to Sydney for determining a matter. Parties to disputes went to elaborate lengths to avoid taking claims over fifty pounds to the Supreme Court of Civil Judicature, which overwhelmingly sat at Sydney. One of the methods was to structure a debt so that it was composed of separate amounts of fifty pounds, so that each part of the debt could be sued for in the court in Hobart.

This was an ongoing problem of concern. Between 1816 and 1819, there were 1560 cases lodged with the court. 1083 were heard and 477 were withdrawn. The increased commercial activity in the settlement made the fifty pound limit a barrier to trade. Bigge had to shame the Supreme Court of Civil Judicature to sit in Hobart in 1819, its first ever sitting there. Bigge was to subsequently recommend the establishment of the Supreme Court of Van Diemen's Land to remedy this situation.

Compounding this problem was that up to 1821, no lawyers had arrived to practice in the settlement. The court had to admit to practice people who had no legal training at all. This has led Alex Lowe to conclude that Van Diemen's Land "was essentially a realm of legal amateurism".

== Trivia ==
The commonly accepted spelling for the settlement is "Van Diemen's Land". However, in the Second Charter, the settlement was spelt variously as "Van Diemans Land", "Van Dieman's Land", "Van Diemens Land" and of course "Van Diemen's Land".

== Sources ==
- Alex Castles, A Legal History of Australia, Law Book Co, 1975.
- "Superior Court Decisions of Tasmania". Division of Law, Macquarie University and the School of History and Classics, University of Tasmania.
