= Edward Eagar =

Lawyer, convict and merchant from Ireland and New South Wales, Australia

- Born: 1787; Killarney, Ireland
- Died: 1866 (aged 78–79); London, England
- Occupations: Lawyer, merchant
- Children: Geoffrey Eagar
- Status: Pardoned
- Conviction: Forgery
- Penalty: Transportation to New South Wales

Edward Eagar (1787–1866) was a lawyer, merchant and criminal.

== Early life ==
Eagar was born in Killarney, Ireland. His parents were landed gentry so he was well educated. He trained as a solicitor and became an attorney to His Majesty's Courts in Ireland. In 1809 he was charged with forging a bill of exchange, and he was convicted and sentenced to death. He pleaded for clemency and either his family influence or his conversion to Christianity saw him gaoled for 18 months until he was transported to Sydney. The chaplain sent with him to Australia a letter to Reverend Samuel Marsden that said, "Edward Eagar has really become a new creature."

== Transportation ==
The ship Providence arrived in Sydney in 1811 and Eagar was assigned to teach children. He soon commenced Bible classes in the Windsor district. He was then given charge of the local school. In 1812 he met with two newcomers, Thomas Bowden and John Hoskin, and they formed the first membership of the first Methodist church in Australia, known as Wesley Mission, on 12 March 1812. Eagar wrote to the Methodist Conference in England to "send us a Minister lest we die in our sins". The Minister, Reverend Samuel Leigh, arrived in 1815, and Eagar introduced him to Governor Macquarie. Reverend Leigh was the first Methodist minister in Australia, and he is remembered by the Leigh Memorial Church in Parramatta. Leigh was formerly remembered in the name of the Methodist Theological College, Leigh College, at Strathfield South, New South Wales and, with its absorption into the new United Theological College at North Parramatta, New South Wales, he is now remembered in the Leigh Theological Library of the Centre for Ministry which houses the college.

Eagar assisted in founding the Sydney Benevolent Society, and subsequently the Royal Women's Hospital at Paddington, the British and Foreign Bible Society, and the Australian Religious Tract Society. He established the Society for the Protection and Civilisation of Distressed Islanders of the South Seas. He also planned the first mission to Aboriginal Australians. He also put up 10 per cent of the funding capital to establish the Bank of New South Wales, now known as Westpac, but he was angry that he was not allowed to become a director of the bank because he had been a convict.

In 1818 Eagar was granted a full pardon. However, Judge Jeffery Hart Bent did not let him forget he had been a convict and had been discarded from practice as a lawyer.

== Convict rights ==
=== The Eagar case ===
In 1820, Eagar attempted to bring a civil case in the New South Wales Supreme Court. However, the recently appointed Judge Barron Field ruled that pardons issued in New South Wales had not been conducted according to the correct procedure and, as such, had not fully restored their rights to property and to sue. This effectively overturned the precedent established in the Kable case, and contradicted several decades of established custom in the colony.

Although the Eagar case could have devastated the colony's systems of commerce, practical realities still demanded that convict civil rights be recognised. This was demonstrated when Charles Kable, (Note: Charles Kable was of no relation to Henry Kable, the claimant in the Kable case.) a former convict who had become a wealthy businessperson, defended an action brought against him for repayment of debt on the grounds that he lacked property rights so could not be sued. As such, in the years following colonial courts managed to avoid many of the implications of the law of attaint through reliance on legal technicalities.

=== Other advocacy ===
Other emancipated convicts also saw their rights denied. So Eagar took up their case with the British Government. He fought for trial by jury and for freedom to trade commercially. This was the first Australian attempt to change government policy. Dr William Redfern, after whom the Sydney suburb of Redfern is named, and Edward Eagar sailed to London in 1821 to argue the case in the Court of St. James's on behalf of other emancipated convicts. Eagar fought the case for 20 years, and eventually won.

== Legacy ==
Eagar was one of Australia's first liberal political agitators. He left his wife and three sons behind, taking his daughter with him to London. He was never to return. He married a 16-year-old girl and they had 10 children. His Sydney wife, Jemima, moved into a new house in Macquarie Street, just down the road from Parliament House, paid for by William Wentworth, with whom she had a son. At the time Wentworth was arguably Australia's most famous citizen. He was among the first settlers to cross the Blue Mountains and the most powerful member of the Legislative Council. Eagar's son Geoffrey became the first accountant of the Bank of New South Wales, a leading public servant, a member of the Legislative Council and eventually Treasurer of New South Wales, described as the best Treasurer of the nineteenth century, and a long-serving Cabinet Minister.

The Wesley Mission's Edward Eagar Lodge in Surry Hills is named after Edward.

== See also ==
- List of convicts transported to Australia
