= Richard Dore =

Australian judge (1749–1800)

Richard Dore (1749–1800) was an attorney, deputy judge advocate and secretary to the governor of the Colony of New South Wales, Australia in the late 18th century. He was the second person to hold office as deputy judge advocate, a position akin to the position of chief justice in the colony, and the first legally qualified person to do so. Author Robert Hughes described Dore as a "blundering and cantankerous incompetent, much given to petty graft". In reality, he was probably no worse than other deputy judge advocates who served before or after him.

== Early life and career in England ==
Dore was probably born in Chipping Ongar, Essex, England in 1749. Whilst his precise date of birth is not known, he was baptized on 21 March of that year. He was the son of William Dore, who was an attorney in the Court of Common Pleas.

Dore was indentured as a clerk to his father in his father's practice, and Dore subsequently was admitted as an attorney of the same court as his father on 12 February 1772.

On 12 April 1782, he married Maria Nassau de Zuylestein, daughter of the fourth Earl of Rochford William Henry Nassau de Zuylestein of St Osyth Priory Essex, at St Marylebone.

On 9 September 1797 he was commissioned as deputy judge advocate of the colony of New South Wales, which had been founded just nine years previously. He subsequently sailed for Sydney on the Barwell and arrived in the colony on 18 May 1798 accompanied by one of his sons. His wife and other children remained in England.

== Time as deputy judge advocate ==
The position of judge advocate was an important role in the colony, although not as important as the governor’s secretary. The judge advocate presided with four military officers in the Court of Criminal Jurisdiction which decided all capital offences in the colony. The judge advocate presided with two justices of the peace in the Court of Civil Jurisdiction which dealt with civil matters in the colony. The judge advocate was also commissioned as a justice of the peace, and would sit with other justices to constitute Courts of Petty Sessions. Dore continued the practice of David Collins, the first judge-advocate, to sit each week in the Bench of Magistrate sittings. These sittings determined less serious criminal charges. His attendance was so regular that when he missed a sittings due to illness, the court clerk recorded his unusual absence in the court records.

Dore has been described as a lenient sentencer, although McLaughlin simply refers to him as being less severe. However, he did have his moments. In the case of Catherine Evans, which was heard on 5 January 1799, he sentenced her to wearing an iron collar for one month and sweeping out the prisons. Her crime was "abusing, threatening and otherwise ill-treating one Johnson" and her defence was that she was intoxicated. In sentencing her, Dore said:

"The Magistrates cannot see without regret the numerous evils likely to result from the excess occasioned by intoxication which is now grown so prevalent and to so extreme a degree that it becomes their duty to make some public examples in order the check the enormities committed by abandoned women whilst in a state of drunkenness, and they strictly enjoin the Gaoler and all others under him to be particularly attentive to the suppression of this dangerous depravity."

Historian Frank Clarke notes that Dore ordered punishments of 100 to 500 lashes to nine Irish convicts suspected of being in an attempt at insurrection. Clarke states that Dore ordered the lashes notwithstanding that the convicts had not been found guilty of any crime.

Dore faced enormous difficulties in the colony. First, his heath was poor, although it did recover during his first year in the colony. Secondly, he suffered from the lack of adequate legal supplies, such as parchment and stationery, items which are essential to legal affairs. Lastly, he suffered from the lack of adequate legal resources, an affliction that was to continue to affect the colony even to the time of Chief Justice Frederick Matthew Darley in the late 19th century. This was particularly worrying as since the colony was considered by the British Government to be a settled colony, all the laws of England at the time of settlement of the colony, applied to the colony subject to any necessary modifications. Without legal books, ascertainment of the law would be difficult to define.

Governor John Hunter appointed Michael Massey Robinson to assist Dore. Robinson was a convict who had been legally trained. Dore had met Robinson on the voyage out from England on the Barwell. According to Donovan Clarke, Robinson was soon to run the office of deputy judge advocate for Dore's successor.

At the same time, Hunter appointed Dore as his own personal secretary. That appointment was not to last, as Hunter removed Dore on 23 January 1799. Dore unfortunately had taken the liberty of changing one of Hunter's dispatches to England to Dore's advantage. Dore had added a paragraph in which Hunter "announced" the appointment of Dore as Hunter's secretary on the recommendation of the William Henry Bentinck, 4th Duke of Portland. The problem with this change was that Portland had not made such a recommendation. Dore was replaced by Captain Neil Mckellar who held the position until April 1801.

== Conflict with Governor Hunter ==
Dore came into conflict with Hunter over many things. First there was the issue of the charging of court fees. Court fees comprised part of a judge's income in the United Kingdom. It is not clear whether previous judge advocates did collect a part of those fees in New South Wales. John McLaughlin suggests that fees had not been charged prior to the time of Dore. Chief Justice Frederick Richard Jordan noted that David Collins, Dore's predecessor, had collected a portion of court fees for Admiralty work in another New South Wales court. Author Noel Nairn states that Hunter sought to fund a school for orphans by introducing licence fees for "victuallers", so the new fee may have in fact been a licence fee rather than court fees. Historian K G Allars notes that Hunter thought that the charges made by Dore for the issuing of writs and licences were excessive. Whatever the situation, Hunter wanted those fees to go to an orphan asylum in the colony. Hunter instead had to provide rations to those undertaking the care of orphans.

Next, Hunter did not wish writs to be issued against convicts. In those days, debtors who did not pay their debts could be imprisoned until their debt was paid. A convict who was imprisoned was therefore unable to perform work duties for the colony. Allars states that Hunter did not agree with the practice because it showed that Dore sided with 'petty traders' in the colony who were causing convicts to incur debts when convicts were not supposed to be able to hold property because of their status. This was in contrast to Collins and Richard Atkins who favoured farmers and settlers by providing time for debts to paid.

Compounding this, Dore decided to issue the writs in his own name rather in the name of the court. When Dore was questioned about the legality of this procedure by the magistrate members of the court, Dore stormed off and refused to answer any questions. Dore was also to fall out over the trial of Isaac Nichols where Nichols was convicted on hearsay evidence, although as has been pointed out, Dore was only one member of five member bench who had decided on Nichols' fate. One of those unhappy with Nichols' conviction was navigator Matthew Flinders.

Dore also presided over a committee which inquired into a suspected Irish conspiracy. Unfortunately, there appeared to be little evidence for a conspiracy, let alone an attempt at insurrection. Nevertheless, Dore ordered severe punishments for those thought to have planned an insurrection.

Dore died on 13 December 1800 leaving insufficient estate to pay his creditors.

== Sources ==
- K. G. Allars, Dore, Richard (1749–1800), Australian Dictionary of Biography, Volume 1, Melbourne University Press, 1966, pp 313–314.
- Robert Hughes, The Fatal Shore. The epic of Australia's founding. 1987 ISBN 0-394-75366-6
- John McLaughlin, "The Magistracy in New South Wales, 1788–1850". Thesis for University of New South Wales 1973.
