= Ellis Bent =

Australian judge (1783–1815)

- Ellis Bent
- Born: 1783
- Died: 10 November 1815 (aged 31–32)
- Burial place: Old Sydney Burial Ground; Garden Island; St Thomas Rest Park
- Education: Peterhouse, Cambridge
- Occupation: Judge
- Father: Robert Bent
- Relatives: Jeffery Bent (brother)

Ellis Bent (1783 – 10 November 1815) was the Deputy Judge Advocate between 1810 and 1815 of the Australian colony of New South Wales, which was eventually to become an Australian state. The Deputy Judge Advocate of New South Wales was the senior legal officer of the colony and functioned in many ways as a Chief Justice. Bent was the first barrister to be appointed to a judicial office in the infant colony in an era when military officers were commonly appointed to the position.

Bent Street in Sydney, Bent's Basin and Ellis Bent Road, Greendale near the Warragamba Dam are named after him.

== Early years and education ==
Bent was born in 1783 although his birthdate is sometimes recorded as 1779. He was the second son of the merchant, ship owner and MP Robert Bent, and the younger brother of Jeffery Bent. He grew up in Surrey, England on the family estate Moulsey.

He was educated at Peterhouse, Cambridge and was awarded a Bachelor of Arts in 1804 and a Master of Arts in 1807. He was called to the Bar in 1805 practising in England for a number of years. He was described as a tall and rather heavy man, and his health was poor.

== Judge-advocate ==
He was appointed by Lord Bathurst as the deputy judge-advocate of the colony of New South Wales as from 1 January 1809. He arrived at Sydney on 1 January 1810 on board HMS Dromedary, which happened to be carrying the new Governor of New South Wales, Lachlan Macquarie. Bent took over from his predecessor Richard Atkins who was generally regarded in the colony as incompetent.

The role of deputy judge-advocate (commonly referred to as the "judge-advocate") placed Bent as the primary judicial member of the colony. He presided with six military officers in the Court of Criminal Jurisdiction, which was the only criminal court of colony which dealt with serious criminal crimes and was the only court which could sentence a person to death. He also presided with two nominees appointed by the governor in the Court of Civil Jurisdiction, which was the principal civil court of the colony. He held a commission to preside in the Vice-Admiralty Court to deal with admiralty issues that arose from time to time. He lastly presided with another magistrate as the Bench of Magistrates to deal with less serious criminal matters in Sydney.

Bent was well regarded by Macquarie initially, and set about his role of judge-advocate with vigor and good faith. In recognition, Macquarie had a new residence built for Bent, which was completed in June 1812.

== Legal reform in the colony ==
Bent made recommendations to Lord Bathurst concerning the administration of justice in the colony. Some of these related to the introduction of jury trial in the colony and the creation of a new superior court to deal with civil matters. For this latter court, he proposed that a judge be appointed to sit with two magistrates.

Macquarie recommended that the plan be adopted and suggested to the English authorities that Bent should be made the first judge of any such court created. Bent was passed over for the position, and instead it was offered to his brother Jeffrey Bent. The establishment of this latter court, the Supreme Court of Civil Judicature (commonly referred to as the Supreme Court) lessened the workload of Bent as the Court of Civil Jurisdiction over which he presided was abolished as a result of the establishment of that Supreme Court.

Bent was quite progressive for the time. He allowed ex-convict lawyers to appear before his court when such a course was not possible in England under English law. He did this by allowing them to appear as agents of the parties, rather than formally admitting the lawyers as officers of the court. This met with general approval in the colony as it was a practical solution which facilitated the application of justice in the colony at a time when the colony was in its infancy. It has to be remembered that Bent was the first lawyer to emigrate to the colony of his own free will.

== Later years ==
Macquarie and Bent were to be at loggerheads in the later years of Bent's appointment. They firstly disagreed over the independence of the judiciary, something that is taken for granted today in common law countries. Macquarie took the view that Bent's commission required him to obey the orders and directions of the governor in all times. Bent took the view that he should only obey the "lawful" instructions of the governor.

Secondly, Bent came under the influence of his brother. Unfortunately, Bent's brother proved to be the opposite of Bent and was obstructive at every possible time. Whilst Bent had been initially progressive in allowing convict lawyers to appear in the Court of Civil Jurisdiction to assist litigants as agents, he sided with his brother that they should not be allowed to appear in the newly created Supreme Court of Civil Judicature to which his brother had been appointed. This raised Macquarie's ire as it impeded the ability of the new court to function.

Lastly, Bent clashed with Macquarie over the introduction of new shipping rules for the colony. Bent had initially concurred with Macquarie's shipping rules in 1810. However, in 1814, when Macquarie provided a draft set of revised rules, Bent found them to be unnecessary and some to be illegal.

== Closing days ==
The mounting differences between Macquarie, Bent and Bent's brother led Macquarie to write to Lord Bathurst offering to resign unless both Bents were removed from office. Bathurst did so in January 1816, siding with Macquarie rather than the Bents. Before notification of Bent's dismissal arrived in the colony, Bent had died on 10 November 1815.

Bent left a widow and four children, and a fifth child was born subsequently to his death. Unfortunately, he left no estate to his wife and children on his death. Macquarie graciously wrote to Lord Bathurst recommending the payment of a pension to widow in view of Bent's services to the colony. Bathurst approved, and a pension of £200 a year was granted to Mrs Bent in 1817. She subsequently returned to England.

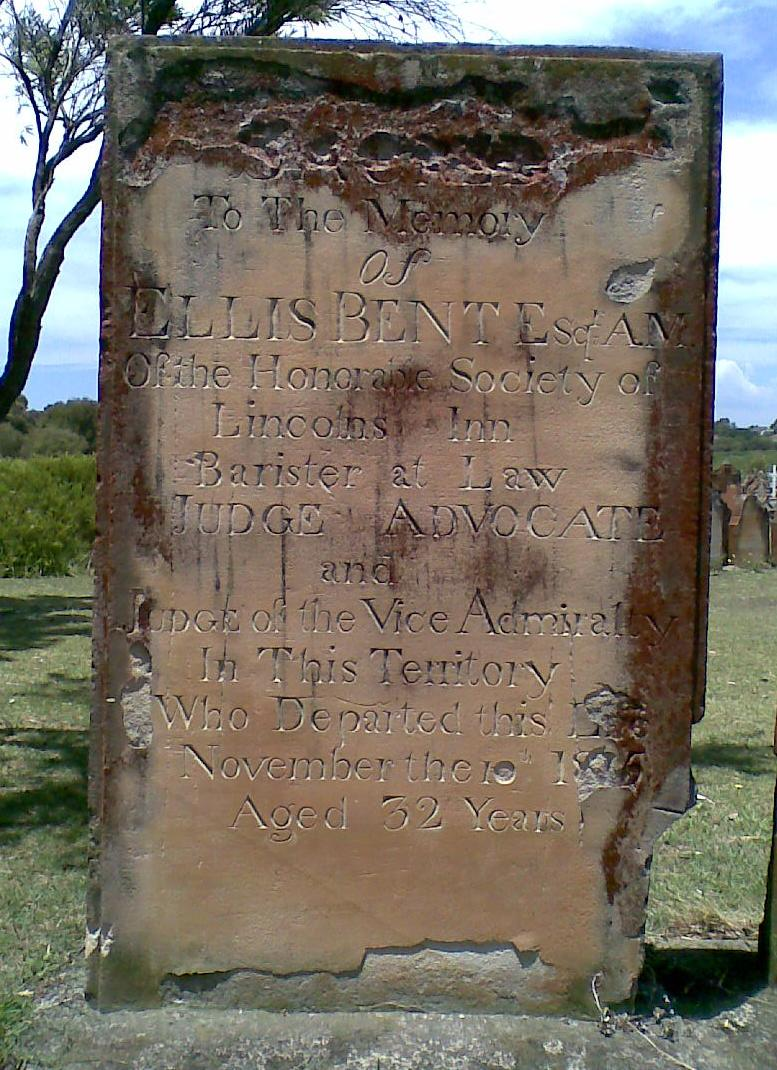
Ellis Bent headstone, Botany Bay Cemetery

== Burial ==
Bent was buried at Old Sydney Burial Ground, now the site of Sydney Town Hall. He was buried there rather than at Garden Island (upon which Bent had a lease) because of his earlier disagreements with Macquarie.

In 1823 Bent's remains were removed from the Old Burial Ground and placed in a vault on Garden Island. Later, after 1825 when Brevet-Major John Ovens died, he was also removed to Garden Island in accordance with Bent's earlier wishes.

Later, his sandstone tomb was transferred to the Rest Park in St Thomas' Cemetery. His headstone is located at the Botany Cemetery, Eastern Suburbs of Sydney. where many of the headstones from the old Devonshire Street Cemetery were relocated.

== Sources ==
- C. H. Currey, 'Bent, Ellis (1783–1815)', Australian Dictionary of Biography, Online Edition, Copyright 2006, Australian National University
- Serle, Percival (1949). "Bent, Ellis". Dictionary of Australian Biography. Sydney: Angus & Robertson.
- Alex Castles, An Australian Legal History, Law Book Co, 1975.
