= Old Sydney Burial Ground =

Cemetery in New South Wales, Australia

- Interactive map of Old Sydney Burial Ground

Details
- Established: 1792
- Closed: 1820
- Location: Sydney, New South Wales
- Country: Australia
- Coordinates: 33°52′23″S 151°12′23″E
- Type: No longer extant
- Size: 2 acres (0.81 ha)
- No. of interments: 2000+
- Find a Grave: Old Sydney Burial Ground

The Old Sydney Burial Ground is the site of Sydney's inaugural permanent cemetery, located near the current corner of George Street and Druitt Street. Established in September 1792, the cemetery was closed in 1820, when the Devonshire Street Cemetery (also known as the Brickfield Cemetery or Sandhills Cemetery; now Central railway station) was opened; the cemetery was deemed a threat to public health by Governor Lachlan Macquarie. Covering about 8000 square metres, the cemetery was for the entire population, convicts and free citizens alike. There were about 2,000 people buried here, however no register was kept.

Sydney Town Hall and parts of Town Hall railway station are located on the grounds of the cemetery.
