= John Wylde =

Australian judge (1781–1859)

Sir John Wylde

Deputy Judge Advocate of New South Wales
- In office 1816–1824
- Preceded by: Ellis Bent
- Succeeded by: Position replaced by Local Court of New South Wales

Chief Justice of Cape Colony
- In office 1827–1855
- Preceded by: Johannes Andreas Truter
- Succeeded by: Sir Sidney Smith Bell (acting)

Personal details
- Born: 11 May 1781 Newgate Street, London
- Died: 13 December 1859 (aged 78) Cape Town, South Africa
- Spouse: Elizabeth Jane Moore (m. 1805)
- Children: 9
- Education: Trinity College, Cambridge
- Known for: Chief Justice

Sir John Wylde (or Wilde; 11 May 1781 – 13 December 1859) was Chief Justice of the Cape Colony, Cape of Good Hope and a judge of the Supreme Court of the colony of New South Wales born at Warwick Square, Newgate Street, London.

== Member of a family of lawyers ==
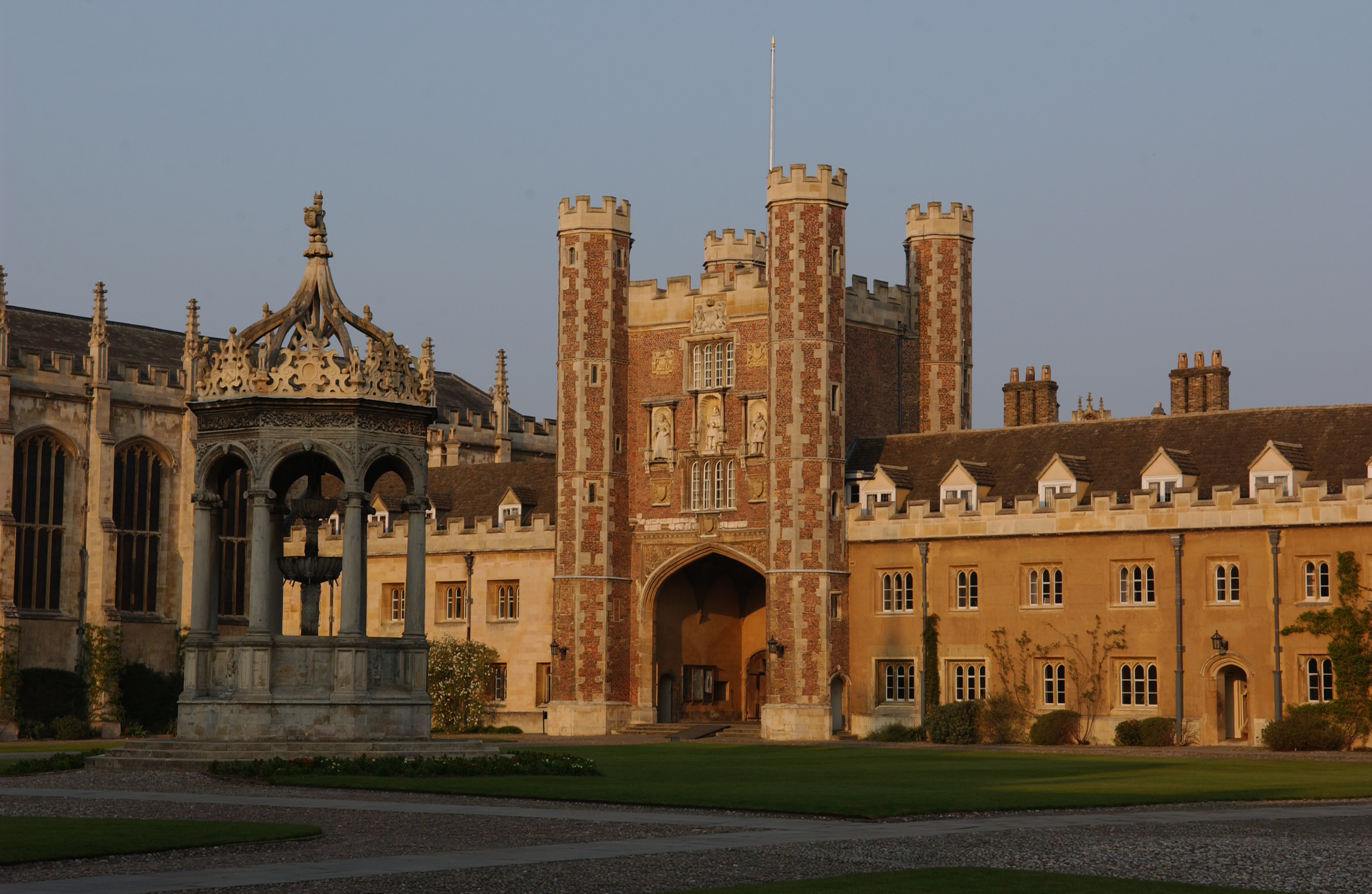
Trinity College, Cambridge, where Wylde was educated.

He was the eldest son of Thomas Wilde 1758-1821(NSW), attorney of Saffron Walden and Warwick Square London, founder in 1785 of Wilde Sapte, very recently Denton Wilde Sapte and now the multinational law firm Dentons and Mary Anne, née Knight. Late in life Thomas Wilde, an amateur naturalist "of some distinction", retired and taking his piano, cello and flute followed his son John to Sydney, Australia where he died 4 December 1821. In February 1817 Thomas Wylde was elected to the first board of directors of the Bank of New South Wales.

John Wylde's two younger brothers were: Thomas Wilde 1782-1855, first Lord Truro, Lord Chancellor of England' and Edward Archer Wilde 1786-1871, Solicitor of London who was father of, amongst others: James Plaisted Wilde, 1816-1899, first and last Lord Penzance; and General Sir Alfred Thomas Wilde, KCB CSI 1819-1878. Other 19th century Wildes, descendants of Thomas Wilde 1758-1821, were well-known London barristers and solicitors.

Educated at St Paul's School, London, and at Trinity College, Cambridge, Wylde was called to the Bar from the Middle Temple in 1805. At St Bene't's Church, Cambridge, Wylde married Elizabeth Jane, née Moore, on 16 July 1805, with whom he fathered nine children. She remained in Australia and they were divorced in 1836.

== Deputy Judge Advocate of New South Wales ==
Having met with some success as a London barrister, in 1815 Wylde accepted the position of Deputy Judge Advocate of New South Wales, with a salary of approximately £1200 per annum. Wylde arrived in Sydney on 5 October of the following year on the ship Elizabeth. He was accompanied by his wife, six of his children, Joshua John Moore, his brother-in-law (who acted as Wylde's clerk), and his father, Thomas Wylde. Wylde, having considered Ellis Bent's recommendation for 'a professional person ... as Clerk of the Peace' to help in his new judge advocate position, recommended his father for the role.

Posted as the Deputy Judge Advocate of New South Wales, Wyldes duties proved widely varied and arduous, as he effectively simultaneously filled the roles of committing magistrate, public prosecutor and judge. Despite the apparent complexity and difficulty of his position, Wylde discharged his duties faithfully and properly, and at times, revolutionised several of the statutes of the courts and legal system in the new colony; he did not allow convict attorneys to practise in his court, oversaw the establishment of a supreme court in Van Diemen's Land and revised the port regulations of Ellis Bent.

In 1821, Wylde sent a report of the judicial and legal state and process of establishment in the new colony to Commissioner John Bigge. This report described at length the need for the laws of New South Wales to be modified so that they would be in near parallel with those of England. This report, along with Wylde's way of handling his many judicial duties, his suggestions and, at times, even Wylde himself, were fiercely criticised in a confidential letter from Bigge to Henry Bathurst on 9 September 1822. The criticism was so intense and detailed, that it was considered by many to be overly harsh. After a farewell speech at the final sitting of the Governor's Court in May 1824, in which he strongly defended himself, Wylde left his post. His legal career continued however, and in March 1824 he became a judge of the supreme court, until 17 May, when Francis Forbes opened a new Supreme Court which superseded the one Wylde was at, and Wylde's work there ceased.

== Chief Justice of the Cape Colony ==
Wylde sailed to England in 1825, was knighted in 1827 and was then appointed Chief Justice of the new court of the Cape of Good Hope in South Africa. He remained in this position for the rest of his career. He presided over the abolition of slavery on 1 December 1834, and over the beginnings of representative government in the early 1850s. While his work was, according to contemporary accounts, of the highest quality, his public life was beset with scandals. Nowadays he is considered to have been a weak Chief Justice, largely ignorant of the Roman-Dutch law that applied at the Cape, and overshadow by senior puisne judge William Menzies. Wylde retired in 1855, following a stroke, and was replaced by Sir William Hodges.

== Personal life ==
Wylde had and received many land grants, including over 800 hectares of land at Cabramatta, and over 50 hectares in Potts Point. At Pott's Point Wylde built a palatial home where he lived in for many years. Wylde founded what would become a renowned and respected horse stud, became the president of the Benevolent Society, and enjoyed reading the classics. Wylde also had a love of music, and had a piano imported to New South Wales. Among his most treasured musical instruments were a century-old cello and a flute. He was also known to be a very devoted parent.

Wylde died on 13 December 1859. He never left South Africa after being appointed chief justice in Cape Town. A portrait of him, painted in 1827 by Martin Shee, is at Parliament House, Cape Town.

== External sources ==
Wylde, John. "[Letters written by and to Sir John Wylde, in 1817]". Marsden Online Archive. University of Otago.
