= Judge Advocate of New South Wales =

Judge in the colony of New South Wales, Australia

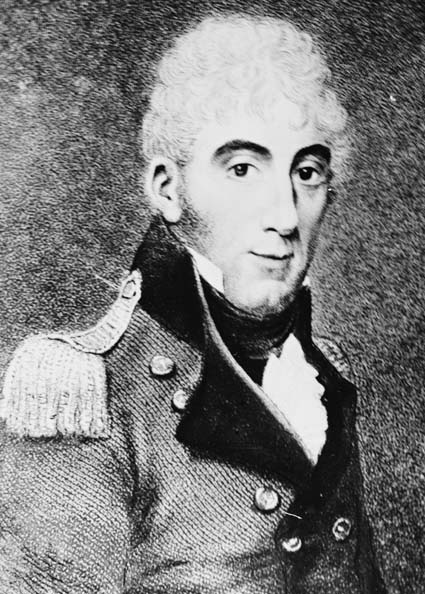
David Collins (1756–1810) was the first judge advocate of NSW

The judge advocate of New South Wales, also referred to as the deputy judge advocate was a ranking judicial officer in the Colony of New South Wales until the abolition of the role in 1823.

Before the First Fleet sailed from England to colonise New South Wales, Marine Captain David Collins was appointed deputy judge advocate of the colony, and judge advocate of the marines.

The judge advocate held office in several courts.

1. He was one of a bench of two justices of the peace in the Magistrates' Court. (Note: Replaced in 1821 by the Local Court of New South Wales.)
2. He was president of the Court of Criminal Jurisdiction.
3. He was one of a bench of three judges in the Court of Civil Jurisdiction until its abolition in 1814. (Note: Succeeded by the Supreme Court of Civil Judicature of New South Wales, in which the judge advocate did not serve.)
4. In the Court of Appeal of New South Wales, he was advisor to the colony's Governor, who was the sole appeal judge.

From 1814,

1. He was assessor of the High Court of Appeal of New South Wales.
2. He was one of a bench of three magistrates in the Governors Court.

David Collins held office from 1788 until 1796. He was temporarily replaced by Richard Bowyer Atkins until Richard Dore arrived in 1798. Dore was the first judge-advocate with legal qualifications. He died in 1800. Atkins was re-appointed and held office until late 1809, although he was temporarily deposed during the Rum Rebellion of 1808.

At the end of 1809, Ellis Bent, a barrister, arrived from England to take up the appointment as judge-advocate. He held the office until his death on 10 November 1815.

== List of judge advocates ==
	Name	From	Until
1.	David Collins	1788	1796
2.	Richard Bowyer Atkins	1796	1798
3.	Richard Dore	9 September 1797	13 December 1800 (died)
4.	Richard Bowyer Atkins (Note: Following the Rum Rebellion in January 1808, Major George Johnston who was acting as governor, purported to suspend Atkins and appoint Kemp as acting deputy judge advocate. In that capacity Kemp sat in the illegal court which tried William Gore for perjury. Atkins was reinstated in December 1808.)	1800	1809
	Anthony Fenn Kemp	January 1808	December 1808
5.	Ellis Bent	1810	10 November 1815 (died)
	Frederick Garling (Note: Acting deputy judge advocate following the death of Ellis Bent until the arrival of John Wylde)	12 December 1815	5 October 1816
6.	John Wylde	5 October 1816	1824
