= Court of Criminal Jurisdiction (NSW) =

The Court of Criminal Jurisdiction was a criminal court established in 1787 under the auspices of the First Charter of Justice in the British colony of New South Wales, now a state of Australia. The Court of Criminal Jurisdiction was the first criminal court in the colony. The court was abolished in 1823, replaced by the Supreme Court of New South Wales.

== Background ==
The British government established the colony of New South Wales primarily as a penal colony, although it did encourage settlement. Its principal purpose was to house prisoners from Great Britain. Captain Arthur Phillip was appointed as the colony's first governor.

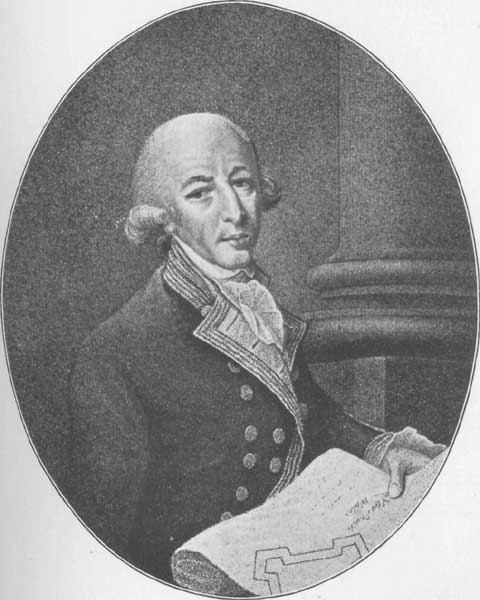
Arthur Phillip

The British authorities foresaw the need for a judicial system to be established in the colony to deal with criminal matters. This was to be a two-tier system. The higher tier was to be the Court of Criminal Jurisdiction, which was to deal with the major offences occurring in the colony. The lower tier was to be the existing English system of appointing justices of the peace to administer the lesser type of offences.

== Jurisdiction ==
The court was empowered to deal with any crimes committed in the colony of New South Wales. The colony at that time took in what is now Tasmania, then called Van Diemen's Land, Victoria, Queensland, South Australia, the Northern Territory, the Australian Capital Territory, and of the course the current state of New South Wales. The scope of the colony was quite limited in its early days, so jurisdiction over places such as South Australia did not practically occur. In the case of Van Diemen's Land, the court rarely sat there, and prisoners were brought to Sydney for trial, or dealt with summarily in Hobart. The court also had jurisdiction to deal with offences in the colony of Norfolk Island, although it did not sit on that island. Prisoners were usually shipped back to Sydney to be dealt with. Technically, the court had jurisdiction over offences committed in New Zealand but practically did not deal with any such matters.

== Constitution ==
New South Wales Courts Act 1787
- Act of Parliament
- Parliament of Great Britain
- Long title: An Act to enable His Majesty to establish a Court of Criminal Judicature on the Eastern Coast of New South Wales and the Parts adjacent.
- Citation: 27 Geo. 3. c. 2
- Territorial extent: Great Britain; Colony of New South Wales

Dates
- Royal assent: 23 February 1787
- Commencement: 23 January 1787 (Note: Start of session.)
- Repealed: 21 August 1871
Other legislation
Repealed by	Statute Law Revision Act 1871
Relates to	Transportation, etc. Act 1784

Status: Repealed

Text of statute as originally enacted

The court was a statutory court established under an act of the Parliament of the United Kingdom. The court had virtually unlimited powers to deal with criminal offences. The court was constituted by the colony's Deputy Judge Advocate, or as the office came to be more commonly called, Judge Advocate. He sat, as president of the court, with six military officers to constitute the tribunal. The first Deputy Judge Advocate was David Collins.

In its early days, the court was convened when required. It was convened following a precept issued by the Governor under his hand and seal. There were therefore no regular sittings during the early years of the settlement, and it met only whenever the Governor summoned it.

== Procedure ==
The procedure at the trial of an offender was different from the criminal procedures then existing in criminal courts in England. The charge against the prisoner was not a formal indictment; instead, it was a plain statement of the offence committed. Lawyers were not permitted (and in the early days of the court, there were none in the colony anyway), so technical objections were unlikely to arise. Only one of the judge-advocates appointed to the role over the years was a lawyer. The rest were just military officers, so their knowledge of the law was not great.

The first court assembled in full military regalia with a full military guard. Phillip wished the first sittings to be an example to the convicts and to impress upon them the authority of the court and the rule of law. Collins later in his memoirs reflected that the first court was a failure, as the sentences imposed were not sufficiently strong to deter crimes in the colony.

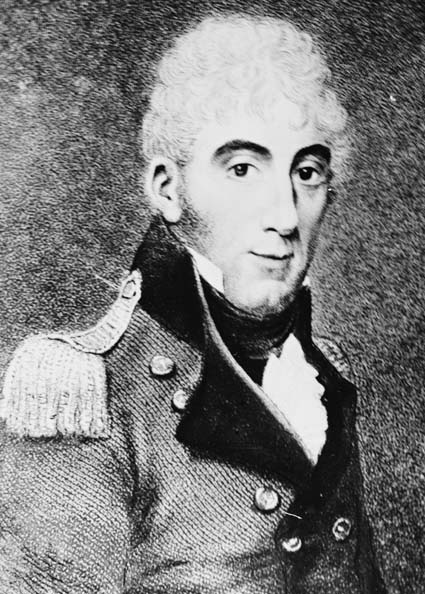
David Collins

The judge-advocate was the presiding officer, and would do everything a normal judge would do. Unlike a judge, though, he was also one of the jury. This differed substantially from how criminal justice was administered in England. When the prisoner was brought before the court, the charge was read over to him or her, and he or she was called upon to plead. Witnesses were then examined for the Crown. The prosecution was not conducted by the judge-advocate. Instead, in line with the practice of Courts-martial in England, it was left in the hands of the person who had made the charge. In contrast to the English situation, the prisoner was allowed to cross-examine the crown's witnesses. The prisoner was left to conduct his defence without legal assistance. At the conclusion of the case, the Court was cleared, and the judge-advocate and the officers deliberated over their verdict. As soon as they reached their decision, the doors were opened again and the sentence was pronounced in public. In cases not involving the punishment of death, a verdict of the majority was sufficient. If the charge was a capital offence (and nearly every criminal charge in those days was capital) the concurrence of five members of the Court was necessary before the sentence could be carried out. Where fewer than five members of the court concurred, the proceedings had to be sent to the British Government for its consideration.

== Punishment ==
The court was expressly limited to two forms of punishment. These were death, in capital cases, or flogging, in non-capital cases. Fines or imprisonment were not an option as there were no local jails nor would prisoners have the money to pay a fine in the early days of the settlement. However, Phillip frequently sent prisoners for punishment to the islands in Sydney Harbour, and then subsequently to Norfolk Island when that penal colony was established. The Governor's warrant was a necessary preliminary to an execution; but he was empowered by his commission to grant a pardon in any case which was not treason or murder. He could also reprieve a prisoner until final instructions were received from England.

== Differences between the court and courts-martial ==
While the Criminal Court was modelled on the basis of court-martial in England at the time, it was essentially different both in its constitution and its practice. The first and most important difference is the position of the judge-advocate. In England that office was always held by a lawyer whose duty it was to conduct the case for the prosecution and to advise the Court on legal points, especially points of evidence. They did not preside as a judge (as the court did in Sydney) and the judicial duties were performed by the president appointed to that particular court-martial. The role of judge advocate was therefore important, as the president of the court was usually a military officer not professionally qualified to deal with legal questions. Trial by court-martial in England was conducted according to the rules of the common law, and consequently the judge advocate was needed to advise on such matters of law as might arise before the tribunal. The judge advocate therefore had no voice or vote so far as the judgment of the Court was concerned. His function was to advise. He also acted as the prosecutor for the Crown, and was also supposed to assist the prisoner in his defence in the same manner that judges in normal criminal courts in those days were supposed to do. This process went some way to ensure a fair trial for the prisoner.

The judge-advocate of the New South Wales court created by the Letters Patent of 1787 issued by the British crown bore very little resemblance to the judge-advocate of the English courts. The first person appointed to the office was David Collins, who was a captain of marines. He was not in a position to discharge the duties of a legal adviser. The Court therefore administered the law without any legal assistance. An ordinary court-martial court could get by with the procedures established for it because the offences tried before it were simply breaches of military discipline. Punishment for such breaches were regulated by military law. Unfortunately, the New South Wales court was empowered to deal with the whole range of criminal offences, including both common law and statute law which then existed in England. Later judges appointed to the Supreme Court of New South Wales established nearly fifty years later were to experience similar difficulties in understanding the criminal law which applied in New South Wales.

Putting this aside, Collins was satisfied that "when the state of the colony and the nature of its inhabitants are considered, it must be agreed that the administration of public justice could not have been placed with so much propriety in any other hands." This is particularly apt as it would have been difficult to find a jury of twelve men at the time (most men in the colony being either military officers or convicts).

== Sources ==
- History of New South Wales From the Records, Volume 1 – Governor Phillip 1783–1789 by G. B. Barton – Published 1889
- Alex Castles, A Legal History of Australia, Law Book Co, 1975.
- Watkin Tench, A Complete Account of the Colony of New South Wales, https://www.gutenberg.org/ebooks/3534
- David Collins, An Account of the English Colony in New South Wales, Volume 1, With Remarks on the Dispositions, Customs, Manners, Etc. of The Native Inhabitants of That Country. to Which Are Added, Some Particulars of New Zealand https://www.gutenberg.org/ebooks/12565
