= Jeffery Hart Bent =

Australian judge

Jeffery Hart Bent, occasionally known as Geoffrey Hart Bent (1781 – 29 June 1852) was the first judge in the colony of New South Wales and the first Australian judge to be removed from office.

Bent was born to MP Robert Bent. He attended Trinity College, Cambridge, graduating B.A. in 1804, and M.A. in 1807. He was called to the bar of the Middle Temple in 1806. His older brother was Ellis Bent.

Bent was appointed Chief Justice of Grenada from 1820 to 1833 (where he was twice suspended), of St Lucia, 1833–1836, and of British Guiana from 1836 where he died (in Georgetown), on 29 June 1852.

Legal offices
Preceded by Charles Wray	Chief Justice of British Guiana; 1836–1852	Succeeded by William Arrindell
