= Alex Castles =

Australian author and historian

Alexander "Alex" Cuthbert Castles (7 March 1933 – December 2003) was an Australian historian and author who specialized in Australian legal history. He is the author of a number of published books in Australia as well as the author of numerous articles written for various journals.

Castles was born in Melbourne, Australia. He attended the Scotch College, the University of Melbourne and the University of Chicago. He was a tutor at the University of Melbourne and later served as an assistant lecturer at the University of Pennsylvania. In 1958 he took up a post in the Faculty of Law at the University of Adelaide and in 1967 was appointed a professor.

He retired in 1994 and was made an honorary visiting research fellow of the University of Adelaide, later accepted appointment as a professorial fellow at the Flinders University School of Law.

== Works ==
His best known work is An Australian Legal History which was published in 1982. He also published a source book in 1979. Both books are the first systematic attempt to write the legal history of Australia from a local perspective rather than a British perspective. Other books published by Alex Castles include Annotated Biography of Australian Law, Law On North Terrace and Law Makers and Wayward Whigs.

He works are regularly cited by Australian Courts. Justice Michael Kirby notes that one of the earliest references is a decision of the High Court of Australia in Mabo v Queensland (No 2) (1992) 175 CLR 1, a significant case in the history of Australia decided by the Court in 1992.

He was also a major contributors to biographies of many Australians who practiced in the law. These biographies are now available online through the Australian biography project.

He also wrote a book on the legendary 1935 Sydney murders known as the Shark Arm case. The book was called The Shark Arm Murders, published by Wakefield Press, Australia in 1995, which became a best-seller.

== Other work ==
Castles was one of the founding members of the Australian Law Reform Commission and was a member of the Dix Committee, which conducted a review of the Australian Broadcasting Commission. He served on the Law Reform commission between 1975 and 1981.

== Later years and Death ==
Alex Castles died suddenly in December 2003 before he could publish his latest book on Ned Kelly called Ned Kelly's Last Days. It was published posthumously by his daughter, Jennifer Castles. He was survived by his wife, three daughters and son.

A second posthumous book was published in 2003, Lawless Harvests or God Save the Judges: Van Diemen's Land 1803-55, a Legal History (with Stefan Petrow and Kate Ramsay).

== Sources ==
- Australian Law Reform Commission Issue 81 - https://web.archive.org/web/20060903212924/http://bar.austlii.edu.au/au/other/alrc/publications/reform/reform84/16.html
- Michael Kirby, High Court of Australia speech - https://web.archive.org/web/20070829071328/http://www.hcourt.gov.au/speeches/kirbyj/kirbyj_mar04.html
