= Colonial forces of Australia =

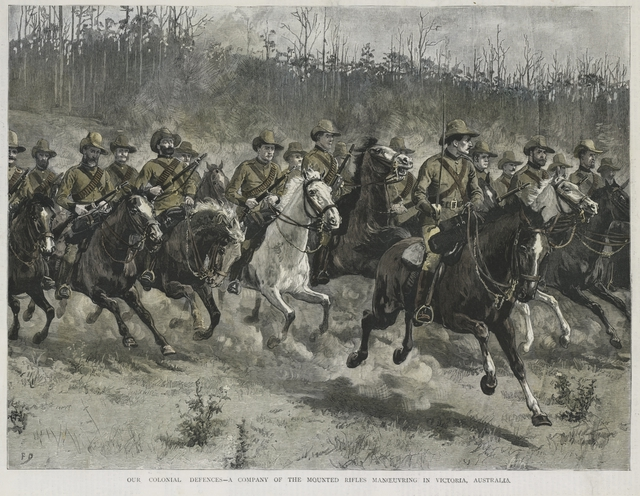
A company of the Victorian Mounted Rifles on manoeuvres in Victoria in 1889.

Until Australia became a Federation in 1901, each of the six colonies was responsible for its own defence. From 1788 until 1870 this was done with British regular forces. In all, 24 British infantry regiments served in the Australian colonies. Each of the Australian colonies gained responsible government between 1855 and 1890, and while the Colonial Office in London retained control of some affairs, and the colonies were still firmly within the British Empire, the Governors of the Australian colonies were required to raise their own colonial militias. To do this, the colonial Governors had the authority from the British crown to raise military and naval forces. Initially these were militias in support of British regulars, but British military support for the colonies ended in 1870, and the colonies assumed their own defence. The separate colonies maintained control over their respective militia forces and navies until 1 March 1901, when the colonial forces were all amalgamated into the Commonwealth Forces following the creation of the Commonwealth of Australia. Colonial forces, including home raised units, saw action in many of the conflicts of the British Empire during the 19th century. Members from British regiments stationed in Australia saw action in India, Afghanistan, the New Zealand Wars, the Sudan conflict, and the Boer War in South Africa.

Despite an undeserved reputation of colonial inferiority, many of the locally raised units were highly organised, disciplined, professional, and well trained. For most of the time from settlement until Federation, military defences in Australia revolved around static defence by combined infantry and artillery, based on garrisoned coastal forts; however, in the 1890s improved railway communications between all of the eastern mainland colonies (Queensland, New South Wales, Victoria, and South Australia), led Major General Bevan Edwards, who had recently completed a survey of colonial military forces, to state his belief that the colonies could be defended by the rapid mobilisation of standard brigades. He called for a restructure of colonial defences, and defensive agreements to be made between the colonies. He also called for professional units to replace all of the volunteer forces.

By 1901, the Australian colonies were federated and formally joined together to become the Commonwealth of Australia, and the federal government assumed all defensive responsibilities. The Federation of Australia came into existence on 1 January 1901 and as of that time the constitution of Australia stated that all defence responsibility was vested in the Commonwealth government. Co-ordination of Australia-wide defensive efforts in the face of imperial German interest in the Pacific Ocean was one of the main reasons for federation, and so one of the first decisions made by the newly formed Commonwealth government was to create the Department of Defence which came into being on 1 March 1901. From that time the Australian Army came into being under the command of Major General Sir Edward Hutton, and all of the colonial forces, including those then on active service in South Africa, transferred into the Australian Army.

== Background ==
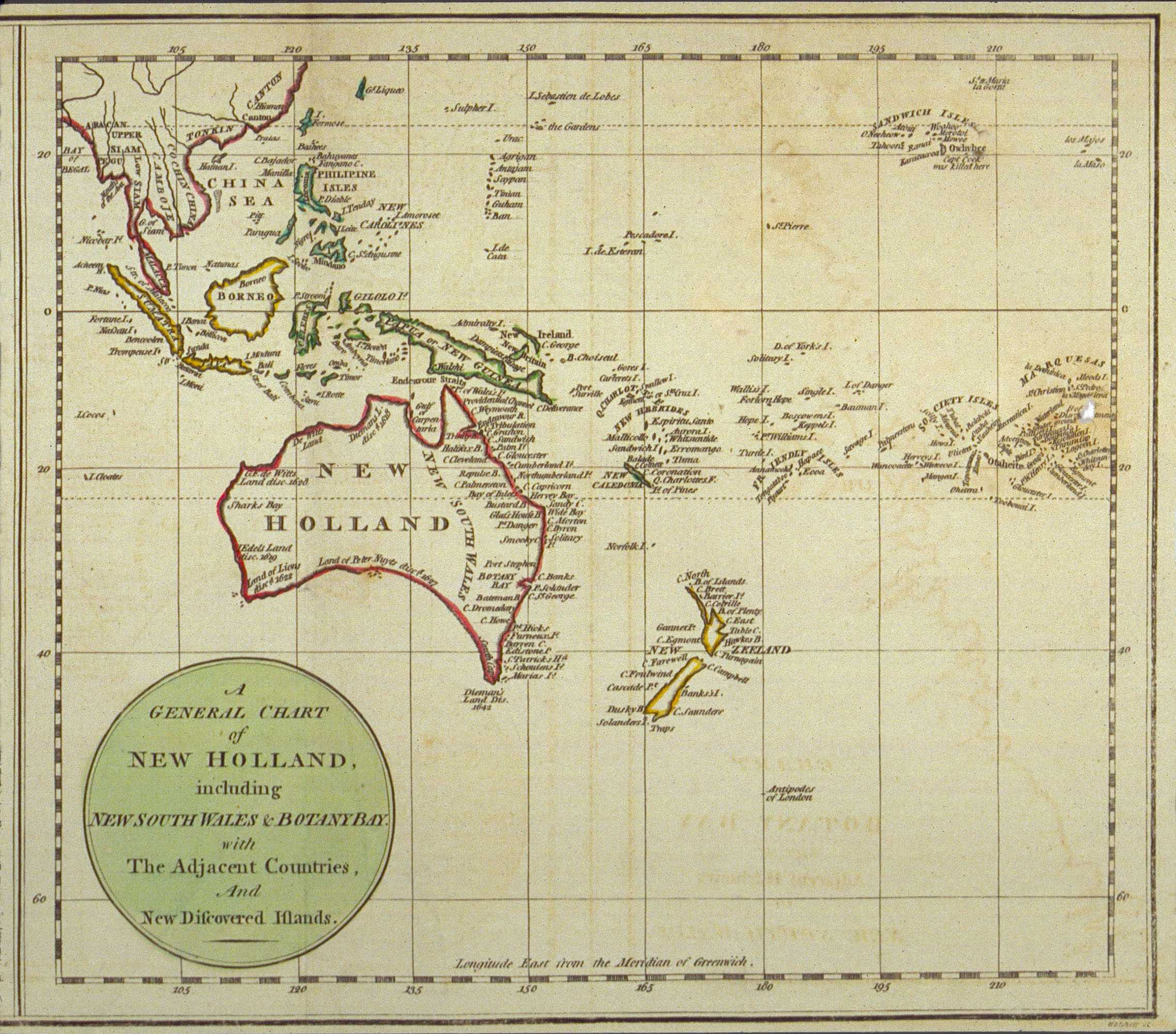
A General Chart of New Holland including New South Wales & Botany Bay with The Adjacent Countries and New Discovered Lands, published in An Historical Narrative of the Discovery of New Holland and New South Wales. (London, Fielding and Stockdale, November 1786).

Australia was first formally claimed by Great Britain on 22 August 1770 by James Cook RN, however it was not settled until 26 January 1788 with the arrival of the First Fleet. Frustrated in 1783 by the loss of their American colonies on the signing of the Treaty of Paris which formally ended the American Revolutionary War, the British sought a new destination for the transportation of convicts. The fleet, consisting of 11 ships, had arrived in Australia with just over 1100, of which around 750 convicts under the guard of marines, to establish a colony with convict labour at Port Jackson.

Initially the colony was run as an open prison under the governance of Royal Navy Captain Arthur Phillip. Later, as more free settlers were attracted to Australia and transportation was ceased in the mid-1800s, the nature of the colonies changed as Australia began to emerge as a modern, self-sustaining society and after the 1850s the colonies were progressively granted responsible government, allowing them to manage most of their own affairs while remaining part of the British Empire. Nevertheless, the Colonial Office in London retained control of some matters, including foreign affairs and defence. As a result, until the 1870s when the last imperial troops were withdrawn, British regular troops constantly garrisoned the colonies. During their postings to Australia, most of the regiments rotated duties in the various colonies, and often had detachments located in geographically diverse locations at the same time.

== British garrison ==
Accompanying the First Fleet to Port Jackson were three companies of marines totalling 212 men under the command of Major Robert Ross, to guard the fledgling colony of Sydney and that of Norfolk Island, which had been established on 6 March 1788 to provide a food base and investigate supply of masts and flax for canvas for the Royal Navy. In 1790 the Second Fleet arrived, and the marines were relieved by a new force which was created specifically for service in the colony of New South Wales. With an average strength of 550 men, it was known as the New South Wales Corps. The first contingent of 183 men, under Major Francis Grose, arrived in New South Wales in June 1790. They were subsequently expanded with further contingents from Britain as well as free settlers, former convicts and marines who had discharged in the colony. Throughout the mid-1790s the New South Wales Corps was involved in "open war" along the Hawkesbury River against the Daruk people. Between 1786 and 1792 an ad hoc volunteer unit known as the New South Wales Marine Corps from the British Royal Navy was created to guard the convicts aboard the First Fleet to Australia and to preserve "subordination and regularity" in the penal colony in New South Wales.

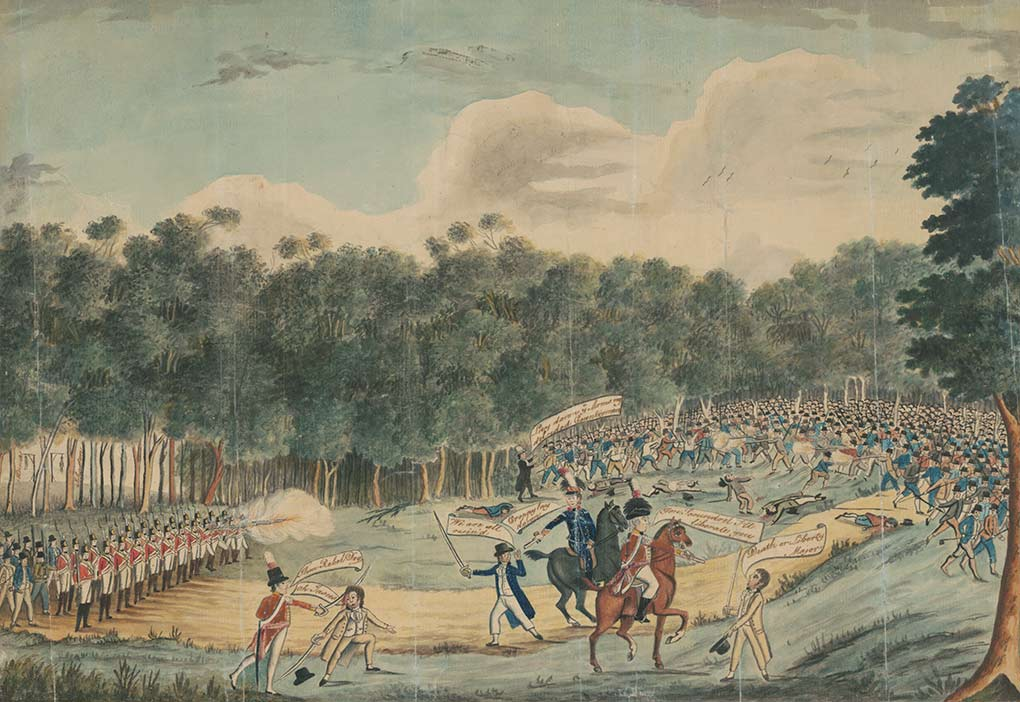
A cartoon some years later of the Castle Hill convict rebellion, artist unknown, from the Australian National Library

On 4 March 1804, the New South Wales Corps was called into action to put down the Castle Hill convict rebellion. Also known as the "Irish Rebellion" and sometimes the second "Battle of Vinegar Hill" in reference to the battle which took place in Ireland during the Irish Rebellion of 1798, it was a rebellion that occurred when mostly Irish convicts, led by Phillip Cunningham and William Johnson, along with many hundreds took up arms at Castle Hill and marched towards Parramatta, expecting support from the 1100 convicts from the river flat settlement at Green Hills, today's Hawkesbury. In response, martial law was declared and a detachment of 56 men (Note: Coulthard-Clark provides the figure of 56, but Silver clarifies that these men were sent to bolster the Parramatta garrison under Lieutenant William Davies and Quartermaster Thomas Laycock. She goes on to explain that Johnston led 29 military personnel, with up to 67 civilians and one mounted trooper, during the later battle.) from the New South Wales Corps under the command of Major George Johnston, marched all night to Parramatta and then pursued the rebels to near the modern Sydney suburb of Rouse Hill, where they engaged with the main rebel force consisting of about 230 to 260 men. A firefight followed between well trained and armed soldiers and the convicts after which the rebels dispersed. By the time that the fugitives had been chased down over the following days, at least 15 rebels had been killed and six were wounded, while another 26 had been captured, according to official records. Nine rebels were subsequently hanged.

Following the events of the Rum Rebellion, the New South Wales Corps was disbanded, reformed as the 102nd Regiment, and returned to England. (Note: 265 men from the 102nd transferred to the 73rd and 111 went to the New South Wales Invalid Company. 80 members took discharge in Australia.) At the same time, the various loyal associations were also disbanded. To replace the New South Wales Corps, in 1810 the 73rd Regiment of Foot arrived in the colony, becoming the first line regiment to serve in New South Wales under the Governorship of Lachlan Macquarie. The Highlanders were replaced by the 1st/46th (South Devonshire) Regiment of Foot, known as the "Red Feathers", who would serve in Australia until 1818.

In March 1810, the New South Wales Invalid Company was formed for veteran British soldiers and marines who were too old "to serve to the best of their capacity", and served mainly as post guards, for the supervision of convicts and other government duties. It was composed of veterans of the 102nd, and other units from veteran soldiers. By 1817 Lachlan Macquarie felt they were unable to perform even these duties, and recommended their disbandment. This was eventually done on 24 September 1822. However, three further veterans companies were raised in 1825 to "relieve the garrison of police work" for service in New South Wales, and stayed on duties until 1833.

From 1810 until the withdrawal of British forces from Australia in 1870, about 20,000 British soldiers, serving in 24 British infantry regiments undertook garrison duties in Australia on a rotational basis, along with elements of the marines, Royal Engineers and Royal Artillery. (Note: Of these 24 regiments, two served second tours. As a result of this, some sources sometimes provide the figure of 26 regiments.) Many of these units were veterans of famous battles of the Napoleonic Wars, and ultimately 13 "Peninsula regiments" served in the colonies. (Note: Upon its arrival in Sydney in 1817, the 48th had over 200 veterans of the Napoleonic wars in its ranks.) While deployed, British Army regiments undertook a variety of duties. This included guarding convict settlements, hunting down bushrangers, suppressing armed resistance by Indigenous Australians, providing security on the goldfields, assisting local police to maintain public order, (Note: Notable incidents where British Army regiments were deployed include the incident at the Eureka Stockade in Victoria 1854 and during the race riots at Lambing Flat in New South Wales in 1861–1862.) undertaking ceremonial duties and developing the infrastructure of the nation's military defences.

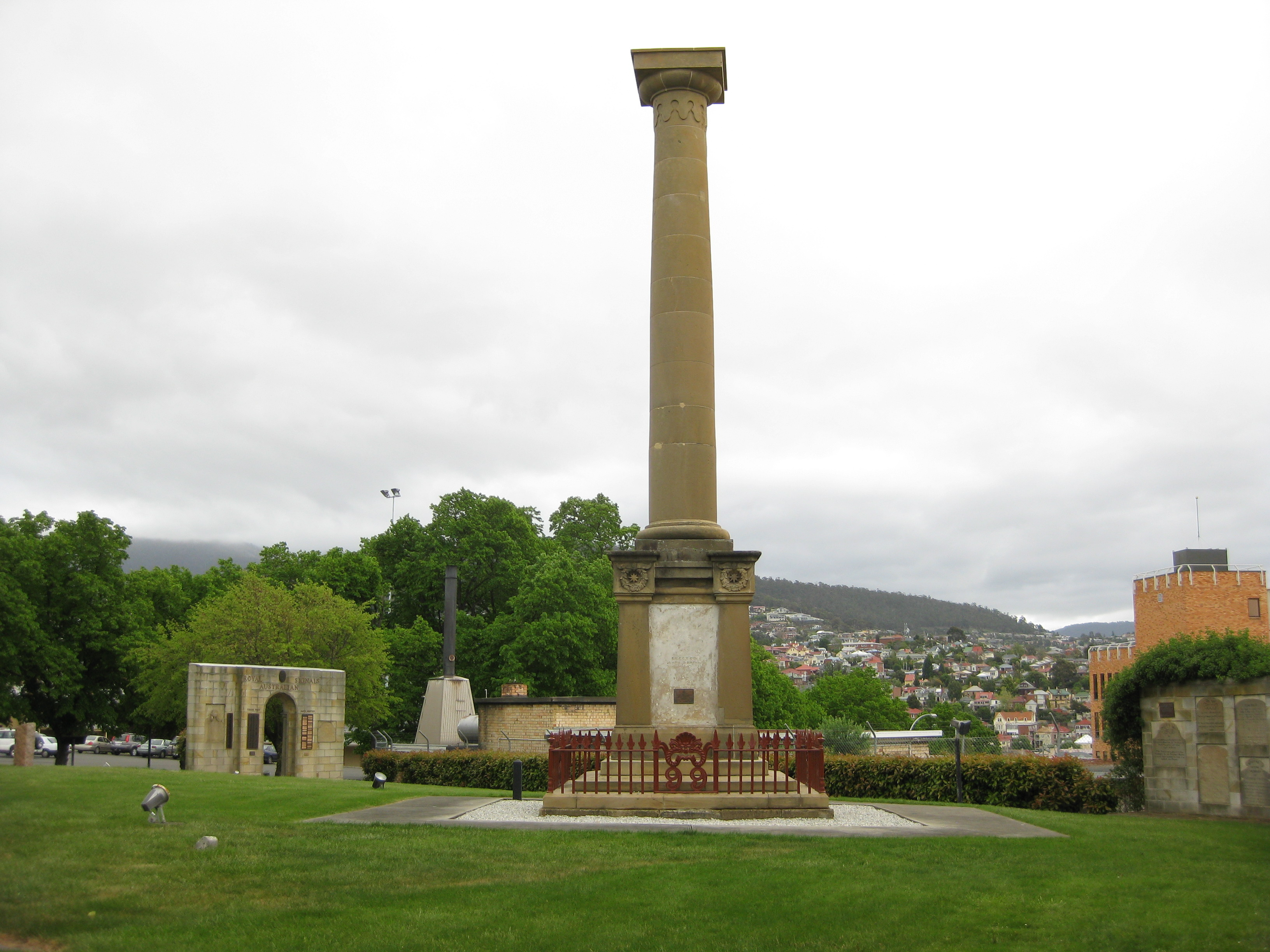
A memorial erected by the 99th Regiment of Foot at Anglesea Barracks, Hobart, to commemorate the soldiers of the regiment killed during the New Zealand Wars. This was the first war memorial built in Australia, and is the only monument built by British soldiers in Australia to commemorate their casualties.

Initially these forces were based solely in New South Wales and Van Diemen's Land (later known as Tasmania), however, later they were sent to Western Australia, South Australia, the Port Phillip District (later known as Victoria), Queensland and the modern-day Northern Territory. Upon departure, most British regiments proceeded on to India where they saw further service. Many British soldiers, however, chose to stay in Australia, taking their discharge or transferring to the units that arrived to replace them.

The size of these forces varied over time. Initially the garrison was formed by only one regiment (battalion equivalent), however, in 1824 it rose to three. At its peak, in the 1840s, there were between four and six, although this fell to two in the early 1850s after the end of transportation and then to one by the end of the decade as troops were dispatched to India during the Indian Mutiny and to New Zealand to fight during the New Zealand Wars or were needed elsewhere in the British Empire. In the 1860s, Melbourne was used as the headquarters of the Australia and New Zealand Military Command, although by this time British forces in Australia consisted mainly of garrison artillery. The British regiments that garrisoned Australia were primarily raised in Britain; however, any Australian born subjects who wished to pursue a military career were obliged to join the British Army, until the formation of locally raised volunteer militia units after responsible self-government was granted in each of the Australian colonies after 1855. Although the British Army did not actively recruit in Australia, "hundreds" of Australians are believed to have joined British regiments. One Australian, Andrew Douglass White, served as an engineer officer at the Battle of Waterloo in 1815, while another, Spicer Cookworthy, served as a subaltern in the 1st Regiment of Foot during the Crimean War.

In the mid-1860s the cost of maintaining forces in Australia became the focus of considerable debate in the House of Commons in Britain and as result in March 1862, it was "resolved that those colonies which had achieved responsible government would have to bear the cost of their own internal defences". Although the British continued to provide military forces in the way of 15 companies of infantry, (Note: In 1863 these were distributed around Australia as follows: four in New South Wales, one in Queensland, five in Victoria, three in Tasmania and two in South Australia. Together this totalled a force of 61 officers and 1,266 other ranks.) these were paid for by the colonial governments in the form of a capitation payment. Additionally, between 1856 and 1870, several different companies/batteries of the Royal Artillery served in New South Wales, as well as engineer units, marines and various support units.

There was no guarantee that these troops would remain in Australia if war broke out elsewhere and as a result, in 1869, in response to requests for assurances in this regard the British government announced that the capitation fee would be increased and that troop numbers would be further increased. Finally, in 1870 the decision was made to withdraw the remaining regiment and as a result, by September with the departure of the 18th (Royal Irish), the withdrawal of British forces from Australia was completed, except for a small number of Royal Marines who would remain in the country until 1913, (Note: The Royal Marines remained in Australia until 1913, serving on the ships of the Royal Navy's Australia Squadron, which was based in Sydney until the Royal Australian Navy was strong enough to take full responsibility for Australian waters.) and the local forces assumed total responsibility for the defence of the colonies. The influence of the British Army would continue to be felt, however, through fortifications and defences that were built and in the customs, traditions, uniforms, heraldry and organisational structure that developed in the colonial forces and which, through these links, have been maintained in the modern incarnation of the Australian Army.

== Colonial armies ==
=== Overview ===
For the majority of the period from 1788 to 1870, the military forces of the Australian colonies consisted mainly of a garrison provided by the British Army. Nevertheless, an early attempt at forming local units came in the early 1800s when loyal associations were raised to assist British forces due to concerns about unrest amongst Irish convicts. These units were short lived, however, and were disbanded around 1810 following the arrival of regular British regiments. Although there was some debate in the colonies about forming locally raised units earlier, it was not until 1840 that the first unit was raised, when the Royal South Australian Volunteer Militia was formed. As a "militia" unit, although they were paid or partially paid and equipped via government funds, they were nevertheless citizen soldiers. Provisionally, the militia's establishment could be maintained by a compulsory ballot among men of certain ages who could be compelled to fight, albeit within certain prescribed territorial limits, and who were generally considered to be engaged for a fixed period of service to meet an obligation. Although this force ultimately proved unsuccessful, it sowed the seeds for further development later.

In the 1850s, the provision of responsible government to the colonies led to increased responsibility and self-reliance. Additionally, around this time there were growing security concerns following the French annexation of New Caledonia and the outbreak of the Crimean War, and these factors led to the raising of several "volunteer" units in New South Wales, Victoria and South Australia. These formations were unpaid and were required to provide their own uniforms, although the government furnished them with arms and ammunition. As a result of their status, these units had certain privileges that militia units did not possess such as the right to elect their own officers, the ability to choose the length of their service, and being exempted from military discipline. There was an important social distinction, too, with the volunteer forces being drawn mainly from the upper class due to being unpaid. Over time, the distinctions between volunteer and militia units became less clear as some volunteer units became paid or partially paid, lost their right to elect their officers and increasingly became regulated; likewise, the militia, by consequence of the fact that although possible and sometimes "threatened", the compulsory ballot was never enacted, was essentially a volunteer force as its establishment was always maintained by voluntary enlistment.

During the 1860s, as British troops were sent to New Zealand to fight in the New Zealand Wars the need for the colonies to provide for their own defence was highlighted further. In response volunteer units were raised in Tasmania in 1859, followed by Queensland a year later and Western Australia in 1861. The majority of the volunteers were located in Victoria, which was the largest and economically the most prosperous colony, and regardless of the efforts of these colonies, for the rest of the decade, the colonial forces were plagued by problems of discipline, a lack of purpose, obsolete equipment, heavy financial burdens upon members, poor training and a lack of command and control. Not only did this affect the efficiency of the colonial forces, it also resulted in considerable fluctuations in troop numbers. The dispatch of about several thousand volunteers to fight in New Zealand in the early 1860s also reduced the manpower available.

Further strategic concerns such as the American Civil War, Russian involvement in Afghanistan and the Franco-German War in the 1860s and 1870s, made defence reform an important item in many colonial parliaments and a number of committees and commissions were formed. The situation regarding the question of colonial defence measures had come to a head in 1870 when British forces stopped garrisoning the colonies. In response, the colonies took the first steps towards the creation of a regular or "permanent" force when small forces of infantry and artillery were raised in Victoria and New South Wales. Other reforms that took place around this time included the organisation of units into standard formations such as battalions, increased payments to volunteers, land grants for efficient service, the establishment of annual training camps – usually over Easter – the creation of cadres of professional soldiers, known as "permanent staff" to provide training, the requirement for officers and non-commissioned officers to pass exams and the establishment of minimum required attendance.

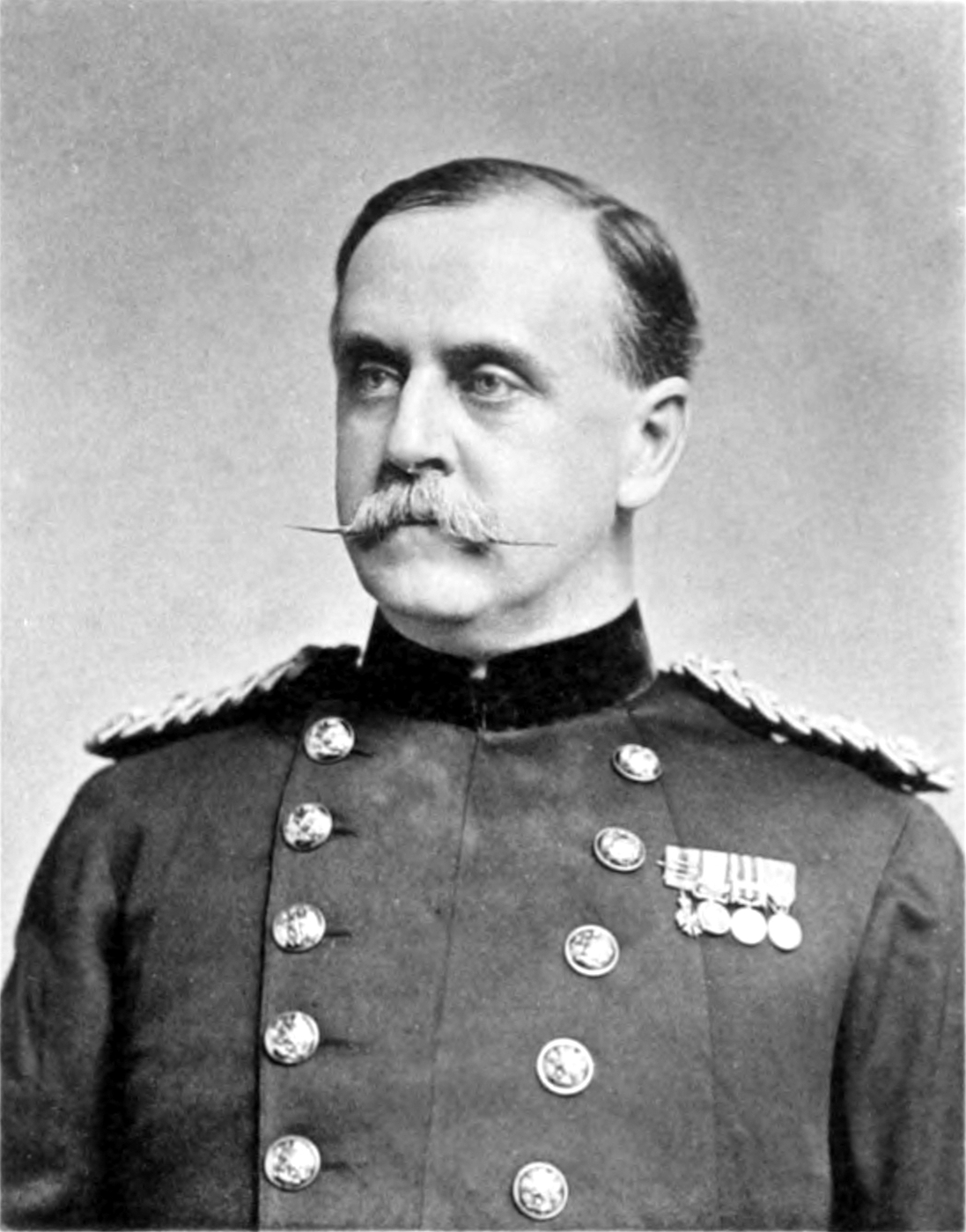
Sir Peter Scratchley who, along with William Jervois, authored the Jervois-Scratchley reports, which were instrumental in the development of Australia's colonial forces after the withdrawal of the British Army.

In the late 1870s the colonies began to consider working together to provide for the defence of the Australian continent when two British engineer officers, Major General William Jervois and Lieutenant Colonel Peter Scratchley arrived to serve as defence advisors to the colonial governments. The following decade a number of inter-colonial conferences were undertaken and this set the scene for further co-operation later, when Queensland and the other colonies worked together to annex parts of New Guinea due to concerns about German imperial interests in the Pacific in 1883. This continued when the six colonies worked together to fund and establish coastal defences on Thursday Island and at King George's Sound, near Albany in Western Australia in the mid-1890s, due to the recognised strategic importance of these points which "commanded important trade routes" to all the colonies. Further co-operation came when, in July 1899, the permanent artillery forces of Queensland, New South Wales and Victoria were grouped together to form the Royal Australian Artillery Regiment.

The early 1880s saw a rapid increase in the size of the colonial military forces. Between 1883 and 1885, the force rose from 8,000 to 22,000 men, although only roughly 1,000 of these were permanent soldiers. In 1885, unpaid volunteer soldiering returned following the dispatch of a contingent of New South Wales soldiers to fight in the Sudan led to fears of a Russian attack on Australia. The resultant wave of patriotism forced the colonial governments to allow citizens to form new units of "second-line" troops who were not as well trained as the paid volunteers or voluntary militiamen. This wave of patriotism resulted in the development of the concept of mounted infantry soldiers within Australian forces, which would later be used in the Boer War and in the First World War as the "light horse", and it was around this time that an Australian character arguably began to develop amongst the colonial forces.

In 1889, Major General Bevan Edwards surveyed the military forces of the colonies and recommended that the colonies should combine their military forces and recommending the creation of a unified force of between 30,000 and 40,000 men, which would be organised into standard brigades consisting of foot and mounted infantry, engineers and artillery that could be rapidly mobilised through the establishment of defensive agreements between the colonies. For the most part up until that time colonial defensive strategy had revolved around the principle of static defence by infantry forces supported by coastal artillery, however, Edwards argued that through co-operative measures such as the standardisation of equipment and training, unification of command and improvements in railway and telegraph communications, "efficient defence" would be possible.

In the following decade, after a number of inter-colonial conferences, in the mid-1890s plans began to be developed regarding the establishment of a federal voluntary militia, although this fell through due when colonial rivalries prevented it from being established. The 1890s were also a period of economic hardship in Australia, the result of which was a reduction in the size of the permanent forces in a number of colonies, decreased training opportunities, reductions in pay for militia and decreased turn out in volunteer units, although this last effect was largely turned around by the mid-1890s when members of the militia and permanent forces who had been turned out due to economic circumstances joined the ranks of the volunteers.

At the same time, industrial disputes in Victoria and Queensland, led to the call out of military forces. Although these deployments successfully restored peace, it arguably led to the distrust of the military by working class Australians which later, along with competing imperial and national priorities, shaped the provisions of the Defence Act (1903) which was enacted to establish the structure of the Australian Army after Federation and which firmly established the Army at that time as a "home service army" made up primarily of citizen soldiers.

In late 1899, the outbreak of fighting in South Africa against the Boers, resulted in the dispatch of contingents from all colonies and an increase in volunteers serving in local units in Australia. Finally, on 1 March 1901, three months after the Federation of Australia became a reality, the Australian Army was formed and all colonial forces came under its control. Upon establishment, the authorised strength of the colonial forces that were transferred amounted to 1,665 officers and 28,385 other ranks, of which only 115 officers and 1,323 were permanent. The actual strength was a little below this establishment, consisting of only 1,480 officers and 25,873 other ranks. This included forces that were at that time deployed in South Africa which were also transferred to the Commonwealth.

=== New South Wales ===
The first military forces raised in the colony of New South Wales were formed in June 1801, when "loyal associations" formed mainly from free settlers, were established in Sydney and Parramatta in response to concerns about a possible uprising by Irish convicts. Consisting of about 50 men each, and receiving training from non-commissioned officers of the New South Wales Corps, these associations are reputed to have been "reasonably efficient". In 1803, in light of the influx of Irish political exiles a concerned Governor Phillip King, raised the Governor's Body Guard, a mounted unit, drawing its personnel from emancipists and former convicts who had been of excellent behaviour during their sentences.

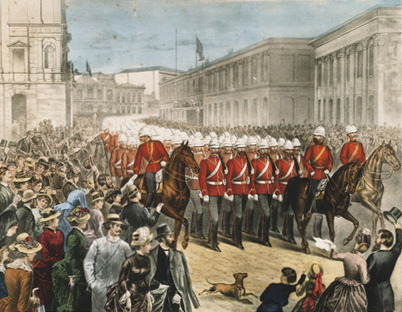
A painting depicting the departure of the New South Wales Contingent to Sudan in 1885

On 4 March 1804, when the New South Wales Corps went into action to put down the Castle Hill convict rebellion, the locally raised Governor's Body Guard conducted reconnaissance patrols in front of the New South Wales Corps as they advanced towards the rebels, militia personnel from the Sydney and Parramatta Loyal Associations had taken over the role of guarding strategic locations to free up men from the New South Wales Corps. This unit was later disbanded in 1810, however, following the departure of the New South Wales Corps and the arrival of regular British infantry regiments, while the Governor's Body Guard was eventually amalgamated with the Mounted Police in the mid-1840s, before eventually being disbanded in 1860.

Following the end of the Napoleonic Wars in 1815 reductions in the size of the British Army began concerning the then Governor of New South Wales, Lachlan Macquarie, and it was at this point that considerations were given to forming a militia force in the colony, consisting four troops of cavalry and eight companies of infantry. These plans, however, were not acted upon, as the British garrison was expanded in the 1820s. Further plans were made in the 1840s and early 1850s, but these also came to nothing. The first steps towards developing a defence manufacturing industry in Australia came in 1845, however, when 5.5-inch mortar shells went into production in Sydney to meet the demand for high trajectory fire support for British infantry attacks on Maori forts in New Zealand.

With the outbreak of the Crimean War in 1854, however, a local voluntary force consisting of one troop of cavalry, one battery of artillery, and a battalion of infantry was raised. The infantry force, consisting of six companies, was known as the Volunteer Sydney Rifle Corps. At its peak, the size of the New South Wales forces at this time was 389 men, however, following the cessation of hostilities with Russia in Crimea, these forces struggled to maintain numbers and government funding.

By 1855 New South Wales had been granted responsible self-government and increasingly took responsibility for its own affairs. The colony remained within, and was fiercely loyal to, the British Empire, and while the Colonial Office continued to determine foreign policy, the decision was taken in London that the Australian colonies would need to start taking responsibility for their own defence. In 1860, as British Army units were being sent to New Zealand, New South Wales attempted to raise a volunteer force of 1,700 men. This number was almost achieved with 1,644 volunteers enlisting, who were formed into one troop of mounted rifles, three batteries of artillery, and 20 companies of infantry. To encourage enlistments, land grants were offered in 1867. It was not considered a success. In 1868, these were later organised into a battalion and regimental structure. The Volunteer Sydney Rifle Corps ceased to exist, being subsumed into the 20 company-strong 1st Regiment, New South Wales Rifle Volunteers. During the New Zealand Wars, although the colony had no official role, New South Wales contributed significantly to the 2,500 volunteers that were sent from Australia in 1863.

The 1850s and 1860s saw further development of the system of defensive fortifications around Sydney. As a result of concerns about Russian attack, the construction of Fort Denison was completed and in 1856 gunners from the Royal Artillery arrived to man the defences. In 1863, a select committee had been formed. As a result of its recommendations, batteries were established along the principles of "outer" and "inner" lines making use of the newer, rifled weapons that had become available, which were established in barbettes along the living rock around the harbour. In 1865 John Soame Richardson was appointed to the command of the military forces of New South Wales, with the rank of lieutenant-colonel.

In 1869 the decision to withdraw all British units in 1870 had been confirmed. By 1871 the withdrawal of British forces from New South Wales was completed, and the local forces assumed total responsibility for the defence of New South Wales. In order to meet this requirement, in 1870 the New South Wales government decided to raise a "regular" or permanent military force, consisting of two infantry companies and one artillery battery, which were raised the following year. The infantry companies were short lived, being disbanded in 1873, however, the artillery battery, known as 'A' Field Battery, was successfully established in August 1871 to replace the units of the Royal Artillery that returned to Britain. Nevertheless, the majority of the New South Wales military were part-time, volunteer forces, (Note: During the colonial period, the term "volunteer" was applied to military units that were unpaid. Regular units, while made up of men who were also volunteers in the sense that they were not conscripts, were paid, full-time soldiers. Such units were more frequently labelled as "permanent" rather than "regular" in the language of the time period.) which around this time consisted of about 28 companies of infantry and nine batteries of artillery. The entire force was reorganised by the Volunteer Regulation Act of 1867, which also gave provision for land grants in recognition of five years service.

The 1870s saw major improvements to the structure and organisation of New South Wales' colonial forces. Land grants for service were abolished after the government became aware that some members were selling the land for profit rather that living on it themselves, and partial payments introduced. 1876 saw a second permanent artillery battery established, and a year later a third was added. In 1877, the Engineers Corps and Signals Corps were established while in 1882 and in 1891 the Commissariat and Transport Corps, later to be known as the Army Service Corps, were raised. The physical infrastructure of defence in the colony was also improved, largely due to the recommendations of Jervois and Scratchley, with new forts such as Fort Scratchley and Bare Island being built, while existing locations were upgraded with new rifled muzzle loading guns.

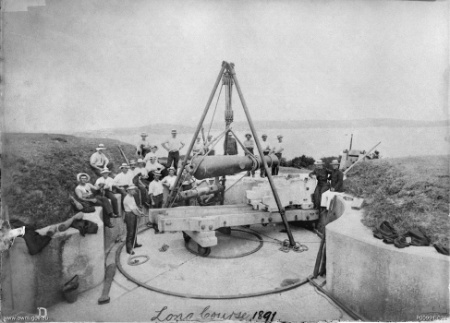
An artillery piece being established at Middle Head, 1891

When the government of New South Wales received news in February 1885, of the death of General Charles Gordon at Khartoum during the short-lived British campaign against the Dervish revolt in the eastern Sudan, they offered the British forces there the service of New South Wales forces. The offer was accepted, and within two weeks a force of 30 officers and 740 men comprising an infantry battalion, with artillery and support units, was enrolled, re-equipped and dispatched for Africa. They were farewelled from Circular Quay in Sydney on 3 March 1885 by an enormous public gathering and marching bands. The contingent was led by John Soame Richardson. Charles Fyshe Roberts assumed command of the New South Wales forces in Richardson's absence.

The New South Wales Sudan contingent arrived at Suakin on the Red Sea on 29 March 1885. There they joined Lieutenant General Gerald Graham's two British brigade's efforts against Osman Digna. Within a month of arriving, the New South Wales detachment had seen action at Tamai, becoming the first Australian raised military force to do so. By May 1885, the campaign had been reduced to a series of small skirmishes, the most significant of which for the New South Wales contingent came at Takdul on 6 May. Shortly afterwards, the British government requested to deploy the contingent to India where there were concerns about Russian intentions in Afghanistan, however public opinion in the colony was against the deployment. They subsequently returned to Sydney by 23 June 1885. Despite their service, and their engagements at Tamai and Takdul, the New South Wales Sudan contingent was ridiculed by the media upon their return to New South Wales. Nevertheless, the contingent's efforts were recognised with an official battle honour – "Suakin 1885" – which was the first battle honour awarded to an Australian unit.

The New South Wales School of Gunnery was established at Middle Head in 1885, while full volunteers were instituted again that year. At this time it was decided to raise a volunteer corps of cavalry who although they were required to supply their own horses, were to also be partially paid, and had uniforms and weapons supplied. They were eventually formed as a light horse unit and were known as the New South Wales Lancers. Another unit to be raised at this time was the Upper Clarence Light Horse, which had initially been raised by its colonel, Sir Charles Chauvel, father of Harry Chauvel, with the intention of being sent to India if the Russians became involved in Afghanistan; the offer was later rejected, however, when the men were attested they swore to volunteer for overseas service. Previous mounted rifles were merged with the Lancers. A further four batteries of reserve artillery were raised in 1885, but disbanded in 1892. The permanent forces also added units of submarine miners and mounted infantry, which were also soon disbanded.

The 1890s saw much restructuring, amidst economic hardships, with many units being formed and disbanded soon after, or merged with other units. Training opportunities were also reduced as the planned annual camps of 1892 and 1893, and militia pay levels, were reduced. Between 1893 and 1896, Major General Edward Hutton, a British Army officer, commanded the New South Wales Forces. He would later be instrumental in establishing the newly formed Australian Army. In 1894, a small group of New South Wales officers were offered the opportunity to serve with units of the British Indian Army to gain operational experience. Following in the footsteps of Captain Henry Airey, an artillery officer who had served with the British in 1887 in the Anglo-Burmese War and received the first Distinguished Service Order awarded to an Australian, at Hutton's behest four New South Wales officers, including Captain James Macarthur-Onslow, took up the offer. After completing his secondment, Macarthur-Onslow volunteered to delay his return and took part in the Chitral Expedition in early 1895.

Many of the volunteer units that were raised around this time often had affiliations with expatriate groups, and names such as the Scottish Rifles, the Irish Rifles, the St. George's Rifles, and the Australian Rifles, reflected this. By 1897, there was also the 1st Australian Volunteer Horse and the Railway Volunteer Corps, and a "National Guard" of volunteer veterans. The colony also began recruiting a small number of doctors, nurses, supply troops and engineer and machine gun units were raised. By 1900, the Civil Service Volunteer Infantry Corps, the University Volunteer Rifles Corps, the Canterbury Mounted Rifles, the Drummoyne Volunteer Company, the Army Nursing Service Reserve and Army Medical Corps had also been added.

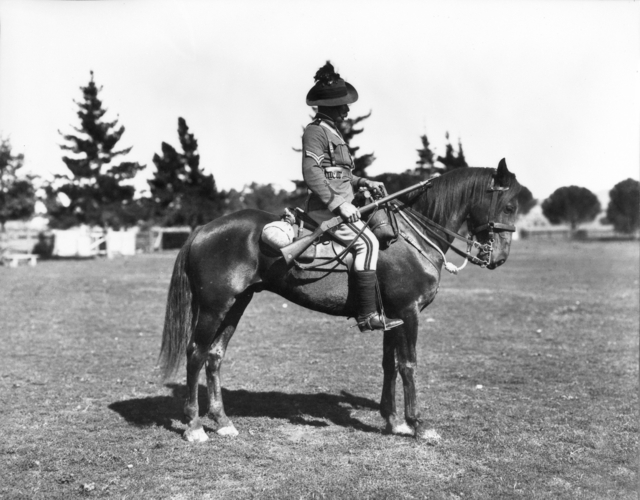
A trooper of the New South Wales Mounted Rifles, c. 1900

Hostilities commenced in the Boer War in October 1899, and all the Australian colonies agreed to send troops in support of the British cause. The First New South Wales Contingent arrived in South Africa in November 1899. New South Wales' contribution was the largest amongst all of the colonies, with a total of 4,761 men being sent prior to Federation either at the colony's or Imperial expense. A further 1,349 were sent later as part of Commonwealth forces. The total size of the New South Wales contingent over the entire war was 6,110 troops of all ranks, which was broken down into 314 officers, and 5,796 other ranks. These men served various units including the New South Wales Infantry Company, the New South Wales Lancers, the New South Wales Mounted Rifles, the New South Wales Citizens Bushmen, and the New South Wales Imperial Bushmen. One member of the New South Wales forces, Lieutenant Neville Howse, a doctor in the New South Wales Medical Corps, received the Victoria Cross for his actions during the war, rescuing a wounded soldier under fire at Vredefort in July 1900.

A small detachment of New South Wales permanent infantry were deployed to China in September 1900 as part of the New South Wales Naval Brigade during the Boxer Rebellion. They returned to Australia in March 1901 without taking part in any significant actions. A survey of New South Wales' military forces on 31 December 1900, the day before Federation, found that the active forces consisted of 505 officers and 8,833 other ranks, 26 nurses, and 1906 civilian rifle club members. In addition to these forces, there was an inactive reserve of 130 officers and 1,908 other ranks.

=== Tasmania ===
In 1802, amidst the backdrop of the Napoleonic Wars, concerns about French interest in Australia drove an expansion of the British colony. French explorers had been encountered in the Pacific and in order to secure any strategic locations within the southern station of the Pacific Ocean which might have been of use to France, King dispatched an expedition to settle Van Diemen's Land. John Bowen, a 23-year-old lieutenant, had arrived in Sydney aboard HMS Glatton, on 11 March 1803. King considered him the right man for the task, and towards the end of August 1803, Bowen left for Van Diemen's Land aboard the whaler Albion. Accompanying him were three female and 21 male convicts, guarded by a company of the New South Wales Corps, as well as a small number of free settlers. A second ship, the Lady Nelson, joined them and in early September 1803 a settlement was established at Risdon Cove.

At the same time David Collins departed from England in April 1803, aboard HMS Calcutta with orders to establish a colony at Port Phillip. After establishing a short lived settlement near the current site of Sorrento, he wrote to King, expressing his dissatisfaction with the location, and seeking permission to relocate the settlement to the Derwent River. Realising that the fledgling settlement at Risdon Cove would be well reinforced by Collins' arrival, King agreed to the proposal. Collins arrived at the Derwent River on 16 February 1804, aboard Ocean. The settlement that Bowen had established at Risdon Cove did not impress Collins, and he decided to relocate the settlement 5 miles (8.0 km) down river, on the opposite shore. They landed at Sullivans Cove on 21 February 1804, and created the settlement that was to become Hobart. Soon after this, Collins decided that coastal defence was needed. A redoubt was dug not far from the settlement, and two ship's guns were placed within.

In 1810, the colony's garrison, which had until that time been provided by the New South Wales Corps, was relieved. They were subsequently replaced by a British regular infantry unit, the 73rd Regiment of Foot, which rotated duties between Sydney and Hobart. The following year, when Governor Lachlan Macquarie toured the Hobart Town settlement, he was alarmed at the poor state of defence, and the general disorganisation of the colony. Along with planning for a new grid of streets to be laid out, and new administrative and other buildings to be constructed, he commissioned the building of Anglesea Barracks, which opened by 1814. The same year, the 73rd was replaced by the 46th (South Devonshire) Regiment of Foot, who subsequently undertook a series of operations against bushrangers. By 1818, the Mulgrave Battery, consisting of six guns, had been built on Castray Esplanade, on the southern side of Battery Point upon the orders of Lieutenant Governor William Sorell. In 1824 the battery was expanded to include two 13-pounders and four 9-pounders; two other guns, 6-pounder brass pieces, were positioned in Angelsea Barracks.

The period of 1828 until 1832 was a violent one in the history of Van Diemen's Land. The rising friction and continuing conflicts between settlers and indigenous Tasmanians led to a declaration of martial law by Lieutenant Governor George Arthur. British regiments came into open conflict with the Aboriginals in what has since been dubbed the "Black War". In 1830, during the "Black Line" incident, groups of armed settlers and even some convicts began a series of military style operations in an effort to push the Tasmanian Aboriginals into a small pocket of land on the Tasman Peninsula in an unsuccessful attempt to isolate them, and prevent further conflicts between the two groups.

In 1838 plans were drawn up for a more elaborate network of coastal fortifications. Money did not permit all of the batteries to be established, but work was begun on the Queens Battery, located at the site of the regatta ground on the Queens Domain. The battery was set back by delays and funding problems, and was not completed until 1864 having taken more than 24 years.

By 1840, the newly arrived commander of the Royal Engineers, Major Roger Kelsall, was alarmed to discover how inadequately defended the now growing colony was. He drew up plans for the expansion of the Mulgrave Battery, and an additional fortification further up the slopes of Battery Point. Work began the same year using convict labour, and soon the Prince of Wales Battery, consisting of 10 guns, was completed. Despite these improvements, the battery was badly sited. As a result, at the height of the Crimean War in 1854, a third battery, known as the Prince Albert Battery was completed even higher behind the Prince of Wales Battery. By 1862, the guns allocated to these batteries were: four 32-pounders in the Albert Battery, six 32-pounders and four 8-inch in the Prince of Wales Battery and seven 32-pounders and four 8-inch in the Queens Battery. Another two 32-pounders were located at Denison.

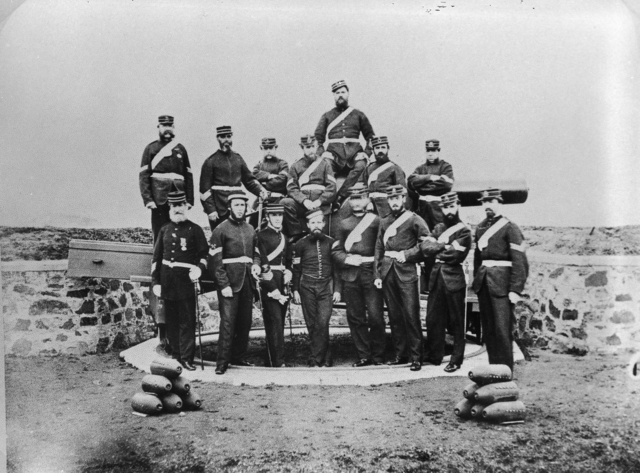
The Queens Battery, August 1869

In the late 1840s the question of raising local forces was considered; the size of the British garrison in the colony at the time was around 1,500, which was deemed more than sufficient to meet the colony's needs. As a result, it was estimated that only two artillery companies were required to augment the British garrison, which could be raised from among the local populace. This proposal was not acted upon, however. Following the decline of British military presence in Tasmania, the Governor of Tasmania felt the need to establish military forces capable of defending the colony. In 1859, the first local forces were raised in Tasmania. These consisted of two batteries of "volunteer" artillery, the Hobart Town Artillery Company and the Launceston Volunteer Artillery Company, which had initially begun its service as an infantry unit under the designation of the Launceston Volunteer Artillery Corps. Twelve companies of "volunteer" infantry were also raised. This force totalled 1,200 men. The infantry units that were raised at the time bore titles such as the Freemasons Corps, the Oddfellows, the Manchester Unity, the Buckingham Rifles, The City Guards, the Kingborough Rifles, the Derwent Rifles and the Huon Rifles. By 1865, the size of the colony's volunteer force began to decline. Although the infantry companies were disbanded in 1867, the artillery was increased by one battery.

1870 saw the complete withdrawal of British forces from Tasmania, which left the colony virtually defenceless. The existing fortresses had fallen into a state of decay and it was decided that the Prince of Wales and Prince Albert Batteries were inadequate for the defence of the town. As a result, in 1871 work was begun on another battery but it was stopped when funding ran out. Even if work had been completed, though, the battery would have been ineffective as there were no artillerymen to service the guns, as the Hobart Artillery had "practically ceased to exist", a situation which had also affected the Queens Battery, consisting of 10 guns, by the time also. In 1871, the Russian corvette Boyarin entered the Derwent unexpectedly. Nevertheless, between 1870 and 1878, the government was unwilling to provide funds for local forces.

When funding became available again in 1878, the Tasmanian Volunteer Force was established under the provisions of the Volunteer Act; Windle St Hill was commandant of the local forces from June 1878 to May 1880. This force consisted of two artillery batteries and four companies of infantry in Hobart and another battery and two infantry companies in Launceston. The following year the Tasmanian Light Horse was raised in Launceston. 1880 saw a reorganisation as the force was re-designated the "Local Forces of Tasmania", which were formed into two divisions spread across the north and south of the colony. By 1882, when Russian ships – the Afrika, Plastun, and Vyestnik – again paid the colony a visit, the strength of the colony's military was 634 men. Further reorganisations under commandant Colonel William Vincent Legge in 1882–83 resulted in the establishment of an engineer corps establishment, the disbandment of the light horse and the withdrawal of the right of the volunteer forces to elect their officers.

In 1885 annual Easter training camps were established; that year the size of Tasmania's military force had grown to 974 men. Work on the Kangaroo Bluff Battery was also completed at this time with the arrival of two 12.5 ton cannons from England. The first shots were fired on 12 February 1885. The Alexandra battery was also finished in 1885, and a force of permanent artillery was raised the following year. However, by 1893, an additional "auxiliary" force of 1,500 had also been raised and three years later the regiment consisted of three battalions, numbered consecutively, which were based in Hobart, Launceston and in the north west.

The economic depression of the early 1890s resulted in a reduction in the size of the colony's permanent artillery. In addition drastic cuts in payments for stores, grants and training also occurred. By the middle of the decade Tasmania's permanent artillery was basically ineffective, having been reduced to just eight men. The colony's artillery holdings the following year were four 12-pounder breech loaded (BL) guns and two 2.5-inch rifled muzzle loaders (RMLs). Despite the lack of government funding, however, between 1895 and 1897 volunteer units held a number of unpaid training camps. In 1897, a reorganisation of Tasmania's infantry saw the creation of the Tasmanian Regiment of Infantry, which was established with three battalions. Government funded training recommenced in 1898 and the following year a mounted infantry force and a medical corps was formed.

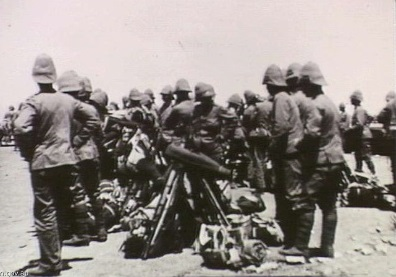
Men of the 2nd Wiltshire Regiment and Tasmanian Imperial Bushmen along the Orange River c. 1900.

During the Boer War, the first Tasmanian colonial force that was dispatched was an infantry company that had been raised solely from members of the Tasmanian colonial forces, which departed in October 1899. Together with companies from four other colonies, they initially formed the 1st Australian Regiment. They were later converted into a mounted force and assigned to the 4th Mounted Infantry Corps seeing action at Hout Nek, Zand River, Bloemfontein, Diamond Hill, Balmoral, Belfast, Karee Kloof, Brandfort, Vet River, Zand River, Elandsfontein, Johannesburg, and Diamond River before returning to Australia in December 1900. The colony's second contingent left in February 1900. Drawing its personnel both from serving soldiers and civilians who volunteered for service, who were grouped together in the Tasmanian Citizens Bushmen, it was a mounted infantry unit. These mounted infantry units were primarily made up of volunteers who had good bushcraft, riding and shooting skills. They subsequently served in Rhodesia and western Transvaal.

The first two Victoria Crosses awarded to Australians in that conflict were earned by Private John Bisdee and Lieutenant Guy Wylly, both members of the Tasmanian Bushmen, in action near Warm Bad in 1900. A total of 179 Tasmanian troops were provided at the colony's expense, while a further 375 were provided under Imperial funds. Another 303 Tasmanians served as part of Commonwealth units.

On 31 December 1900 the day before Federation, a survey of the strength of colonial forces found that the Tasmanian colonial forces consisted of 113 officers and 1,911 other ranks. Upon Federation, all of the Australian colonial forces came under the control of the Federal Government of Australia. As a result, the Tasmanian Mounted Infantry units were redesignated as the 12th Australian Light Horse Regiment in 1903, (Note: Not to be confused with the 12th Light Horse Regiment which was formed in 1915 in New South Wales for service during the First World War. The Tasmanian unit, which had been formed in 1903, is not a predecessor of the 12th Light Horse Regiment, AIF, and during the war it contributed a squadron to the 3rd Light Horse Regiment before being later re-raised as the 22nd Light Horse Regiment.) while the three battalions of the Tasmanian Volunteer Rifle Regiment were re-designated as part of the Citizens Military Force becoming the Derwent Infantry Regiment (Hobart), the Launceston Regiment (Launceston), and the Tasmanian Rangers (North West).

=== Western Australia ===
In the early 19th century, rumours of plans for a French colony in Western Australia drove British authorities to establish their own. In December 1826 the 1st/39th Regiment arrived at the King George Sound Settlement. In 1827, Captain James Stirling sighted the area surrounding the Swan River as being suitable for agriculture, and upon his return to England in July 1828, lobbied for the establishment of a free settler colony, unlike the penal settlements of eastern Australia. The British Government assented, and a fleet led by Charles Fremantle, aboard HMS Challenger returned along with two other vessels, Parmelia and HMS Sulphur, including a detachment of the 63rd Regiment of Foot, arriving to establish the Swan River Colony in 1829. In 1831, the 1st/39th Regiment left King George Sound.

Following the establishment of the Swan River Colony (later known as Western Australia), a detachment from 2nd/40th Regiment who were garrisoned in Sydney at the time, was dispatched to the new colony. Following them, were detachments from most of the regiments that were also serving in New South Wales. In addition to the British garrison, a small locally raised unit, known as the Swan River Volunteers, was established in 1829; all settlers between 15 and 50 years of age were obligated to serve and were required to supply their own weapons. (Note: There is some discrepancy in the sources. Kuring states that the volunteers provided their own weapons, while Austin states that they were given "a musquet and ammunition".) Although provisions were made to pay these volunteers, the organisation was not successful, however, as the settlements were dispersed over wide areas, making concentration difficult, while economic considerations meant that it was not fully supported by settlers. In the early 1850s, a force of "enrolled pensioners" – former soldiers – were sent to the colony to bolster the British regular garrison and to guard convicts.

The Swan River Volunteers were reformed in 1860, although this proved short lived. In 1861 the British garrison was withdrawn from Western Australia, and so that year the Volunteer Force Ordinance 1861 (25 Vict. No. 3) was passed authorising the creation of a corps of volunteers. Around this time, the colony's military forces totalled about 700 men serving in foot and mounted infantry units, organised into the Western Australian Volunteer Force which was raised primarily in Perth, Fremantle and Pinjarra. By 1862 the force consisted of units such as the Perth Volunteer Rifles, the Fremantle Volunteer Rifles and the Pinjarra Mounted Volunteers. Training was hard to come by, and although the unit was enthusiastic, records show that discipline and poor attendance became a problem as the number of volunteers fell. In an effort to rectify the situation, by January 1869, the government had introduced regulations relating to training and attendance, and although the force remained volunteer, a system of payments was instituted for those who met the minimum requirement of attendance to be considered "efficient". Nevertheless, overall funding remained low and by 1872 there were just 365 men "under arms".

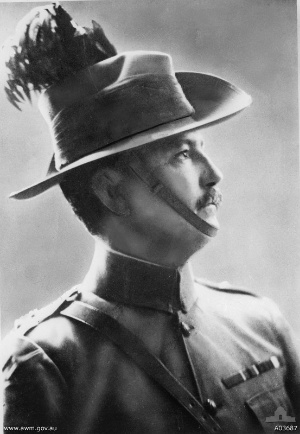
Frederick Bell of the Western Australian Mounted Infantry who received a Victoria Cross for his actions at Brakpan in May 1901

Although the situation improved, the force was still amateurish. A reorganisation followed, and on 17 June 1872 the Metropolitan Rifle Volunteers were formed, with companies in Fremantle, Guildford, Albany, Geraldton, Northampton and York. In 1872, a troop from the West Australian Mounted Volunteers was converted to a horse artillery unit when they were entrusted with two breech-loading 12-pounders that had previously belonged to the enrolled pensioners that had been sent to the colony to guard convicts prior to the end of transportation. Further reorganisation occurred and in 1874 the infantry units of Perth, Fremantle and Guildford were amalgamated administratively to form the 1st Battalion, Western Australian Volunteers. More changes came the following year when promotions for officers were tied to examination performance, and field and barracks training was made available for all ranks. Corps were brought together annually, normally over Easter to practice manoeuvres, during which smaller units were merged with larger units; training became more organised and professional instructors were enlisted. By 1880 mounted infantry units had been established in Bunbury and Perth; that same year the force of enrolled pensioners was disbanded.

In 1883, the colony's military became subject to British military law in the event of war, although under the provisions of the Volunteer Force Regulation Act 1883 (47 Vict. No. 7) a number of limitations were placed on its application. Around 1884, the colony's volunteer infantry were grouped into five battalion-level organisations: the Western Australian Volunteers, (Note: There is some discrepancy in the sources about the name of this unit. Kuring uses the designation "West Australian Volunteers" which may be a reflection of informal usage, while other sources use "Western Australian Volunteers".) the Metropolitan Rifle Volunteers, the Albany Rifle Volunteers, the Geraldton Rifle Volunteers and the Fremantle Rifle Volunteers. That same year, the first annual continuous training camp took place. Held over the Easter weekend, camps took place at Albion and Geraldton. By 1885, the size of the colony's military force was just 578 men, although this increased to just over 700 in 1890. During the Russian war scare of 1885, however, Western Australia's mobilisation was small compared to other the colonies and limited only to an Easter muster of under 400 men. At King George's Sound, strategically important as a coaling station, the local force, the Albany Rifles, had disbanded due to "disorganisation and inefficiency" and although another unit, the Albany Defence Rifles, was raised at this time to fill the void, it was disbanded shortly after the crisis abated.

Further annual camps took place in 1888 at Greenmount and at Guildford the following year. Nevertheless, when Edwards delivered his report into the state of military forces in Western Australia in 1889, his assessment was that "they were of little value as [a] defence force". In 1890, in an effort to encourage participation an efficiency bonus was introduced which saw payments being made to volunteers who paraded 12 times a year and completed basic musketry training.

An economic downturn occurred shortly after this however, and this, coupled with the increased costs of maintaining the volunteer force, affected the government's ability to provide funding for training. In early 1893, a force from the Plantagenet Rifles, a volunteer infantry unit, were trained as gunners to assist the permanent force of South Australian artillery that had were manning the fort at Albany. Due to improvements in the economic circumstances of the colonies after the depression in the early 1890s, eight new artillery pieces, 9-pounder RMLs, were purchased in 1894; although these were technically obsolescent, they were nevertheless an improvement on the two 12-pounder Armstrong guns that they replaced. In 1896, the colony's artillery consisted of eight 9-pounders of the RML type and two 12-pounder RBL guns.

From 1893 to 1898 an annual camp was held in the vicinity of Perth, bringing together most of the force, although units from remote regions continued to undertake their training in isolation. In 1897, a system of "partial pay" was instituted. In 1899, an artillery force was raised by the colony to take over duties at Albany; this force was known as the Albany Volunteer Garrison Artillery. In July 1899, the 1st Infantry Regiment was formed from the 1st Battalion, Western Australian Volunteers, with three companies in Perth and Fremantle and one in Guildford.

The outbreak of the Boer War saw troops from the colony being sent to South Africa to fight. During the conflict, 349 men were dispatched from Western Australia at state expense, while a further 574 were deployed and paid for through Imperial funds. Another 306 were dispatched as Commonwealth troops later after 1901. One member of the Western Australian Mounted Infantry, Lieutenant Frederick Bell, received the Victoria Cross during the conflict. By the time the men had returned from war, Australia had federated and become the Commonwealth of Australia, and the Western Australian Defence Force, which then consisted of one mounted infantry regiment, two field artillery batteries, two garrison artillery companies, and an infantry brigade consisting of five battalions, were amalgamated into the newly formed Australian Army. On 31 December 1900, the day before Federation, a survey of the strength of colonial forces found that the Western Australian colonial forces consisted of 135 officers and 2,561 other ranks.

=== South Australia ===
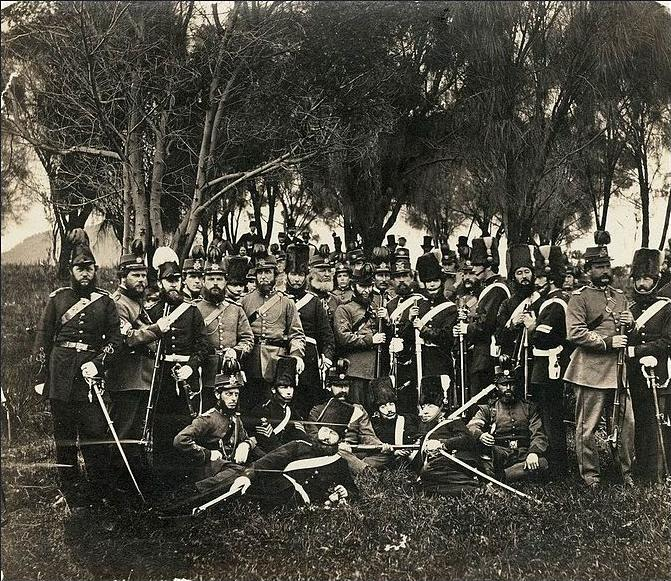
South Australian Volunteer Forces in 1860

South Australia was the only British colony in Australia which was not a convict colony. It was established as a planned free colony, and began on 28 December 1836. As such, garrisons were not required as prison guards, unlike the other colonies. However, Governor John Hindmarsh was escorted on HMS Buffalo by a contingent of nineteen Royal Marines. They were assigned to protect him and left South Australia when he departed the colony on HMS Alligator on 14 July 1838. A lack of any form of defence however, led to the creation of the Royal South Australian Volunteer Militia, consisting of an infantry company and two cavalry troops, in 1840, although it was disbanded in 1851; for the final six years of its existence it had been a force that had existed on paper only. The first artillery pieces arrived in South Australia aboard Buffalo, which landed two 18-pounder cannons, but initially there were no moves to form an artillery unit, so the guns were operated by Royal Engineers. In 1844 a request for further pieces was sent to the British government and two years later two light 6-pounders, two 12-pounder howitzers and two Cohorn mortars arrived with an ammunition store of about 500 rounds for each weapon type.

Despite the setback of the first attempt to form a militia, the idea of self-support was entirely ingrained in the foundation of the South Australian colony, and so the Militia Act 1854 was passed, which allowed for compulsory enlistment of a force of 2,000 men between the ages of 16 and 46, although this option was never pursued. On 4 November 1854, amidst concerns surrounding the Crimean War, a new attempt was made to raise local militia forces in South Australia. The government proclaimed a general order that established the South Australian Volunteer Militia Force, which was to be organised into two battalions, each consisting of six companies of between 50 and 60 men, which would be known as the Adelaide Rifles. The men received 36 days training, and then returned to their civilian jobs until needed. This force was short lived though, being disbanded upon the end of the Crimean War in 1856. A small force of artillery – about two companies – and some cavalry were also raised during this time, although almost no training was carried out and the artillery was employed mainly to fire a single shot every day from Port Adelaide to mark noon. A request for a further consignment of artillery pieces had been sent to Britain in 1854, but it was not until 1857 that the guns arrived. Two 9-pounders, two 6-pounders and four howitzers were received at this time.

However, the colonial government still felt uneasy about being undefended and a "war scare" with the French prompted further legislative revision. The Volunteer Force was reformed in 1859, and soon numbered 14 companies. The Adelaide Volunteer Artillery and the Port Adelaide Volunteer Artillery were also raised at this time. Worldwide artillery shortages due to the demands of the belligerents involved in the American Civil War meant that plans to expand the colony's artillery holdings were thwarted; as a result South Australia's armament consisted of only two 9-pounders, four 6-pounders, two 24-pound howitzers, four 12-pound howitzers and two Cohorn mortars. By the following year, the numbers of infantry had increased to 45 companies with a total of 70 officers and 2,000 men of other ranks. On 26 April 1860, the Adelaide Regiment of Volunteer Rifles was formed. In 1865 South Australia became the first state to introduce partially paid volunteers, which was a system all of the other colonies were soon to follow. This was brought about by the enacting of the Volunteer Act (1865) which divided all military forces into active and reserve forces. Due to organisational problems and lack of equipment, the Adelaide Regiment of Volunteer Rifles was again disbanded in early 1866, only to be reformed again in May 1866. By 16 November 1867, the Adelaide Regiment of Volunteer Rifles had been re-designated as the "Prince Alfred's Rifle Volunteers" following the Duke of Edinburgh's visit to Australia, but lack of funding saw them disbanded. A company of expatriate Scottish immigrants had formed The Scottish Company in 1865, and reformed as The Duke of Edinburgh's Own on 18 November 1867. In 1868, the colony's Whitworth 12-pounder guns, which had been purchased the year before, were fired for the first time when they were exercised at Glenelg. That year the two artillery companies were merged to form the South Australian Regiment of Volunteer Artillery.

The outbreak of the Franco-Prussian War in France on 19 July 1870, led the South Australian Governor, Sir James Fergusson, to conduct a review of the colony's defences. He determined to reorganise the force into two battalions of 500–600 men, two artillery batteries, and four troops of cavalry. However, his proposals received little backing from the colonial parliament, and were rejected by newly re-elected Premier John Hart. Some politicians felt it would help alleviate the high unemployment the colony was suffering at the time, but the majority felt the enormous cost outweighed the potential benefits. Once again the issue of funding stood in the way of South Australia having an efficient and ready regular military force.

The issue continued to be debated until 1875 when interest in military expansion was renewed amongst the colonial politicians. The government had been quite unstable for the first five years of the 1870s, but settled in 1875, allowing for more stable planning. Once again affairs of empires played a part. Russia was once again being perceived as a threat by all of the colonial governments following the outbreak of the Russo-Turkish War of 1877–78. Politicians came under pressure from the press and campaign groups to expand the defensive capacity of the colony.

Finally in May 1877, the South Australian Volunteer Military Forces was reformed consisting primarily of 10 companies of the Adelaide Rifles. The success of raising those units did not stop the political arguments over the issue with wrangling between Governor Sir William Jervois and Premier John Colton temporarily suspending further development. Despite all of the political setbacks, the Adelaide Rifles had soon grown to 21 companies, and on 4 July 1877 a second battalion was formed. The second battalion comprised the companies from Mount Gambier, Unley, and Port Pirie together with the Duke of Edinburgh's Own of Prince Alfred Rifle Volunteers. Training intensified briefly for the duration of the Russo-Turkish War, and then resumed at normal levels, with the 2nd Battalion being amalgamated with the 1st Battalion.

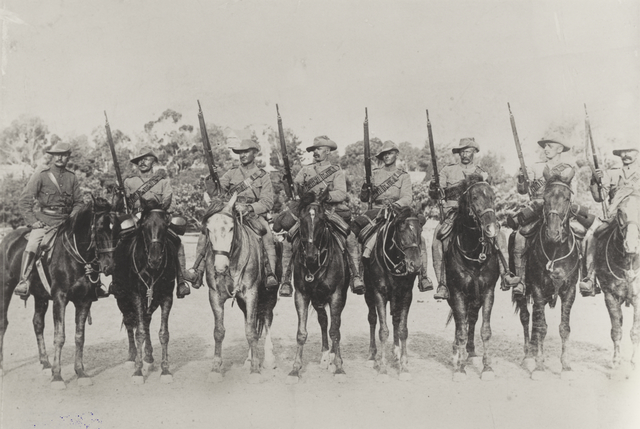
South Australian Mounted Rifles second contingent training near Adelaide, c. 1900, prior to deploying to South Africa

The two artillery companies were reformed at this time under the guidance of Colonel Major Francis Downes, a Royal Artillery officer. The "company" designation was dropped and "battery" was adopted, with the two subunits being designated 'A' and 'B' Battery. The colony's armament was boosted by the arrival of eight RML 16-pounder heavy field guns. In 1879, following the British defeat by the Zulus at Isandlwana, South Australia offered to send a contingent of troops to aid the British response. This offer was rejected, however. Although provisions had been made for a permanent artillery force to be raised in South Australia this was not undertaken and instead the guns at Fort Glanville – completed and under the command of Lieutenant Joseph Maria Gordon by 1882 – as well as the colony's field artillery, were manned by volunteers.

By 1885, the second infantry battalion was again reformed, consisting of the same companies as previously. At this time, South Australia's military strength was 3,195 men. By this time, a second fort, at Largs had been established, while another, Fort Glenelg, had also been planned, although by 1888 it had not been built and its guns, two 9.2-inch pieces, had been left dumped in the sand near the site.

In 1889 a third battalion of infantry was raised, although it was short lived as it was disbanded in 1895. In 1893, as part of the combined efforts of the six colonies to secure strategic points around the continent, South Australia provided a small garrison of 30 permanent artillerymen to crew three 6-inch guns that were established at Albany in King George's Sound in Western Australia. (Note: There is some discrepancy in the sources about the garrison at Albany. Whitelaw states that South Australia provided the manpower, as does Nicholls, while the Australian Bureau of Statistics states that it came from Western Australia.) Up until 1896, all South Australian units trained only once a year at Easter. The commitment of the men, and constant restructuring and reorganising, were in direct response to perceived threats to the colony. By 1896, the colony's arsenal of field guns consisted of 11 pieces, of which eight were 16-pounder RML types and three were 13-pounder RMLs. The following year, the two artillery batteries were "brigaded" together under the South Australian Artillery Brigade.

Upon the outbreak of hostilities in the Boer War, many men from various South Australian units volunteered to participate with the Australian contingent. Any regiments whose men participated later received King's Colours and battle honours. The colony contributed 1,036 personnel to the conflict under its own banner and another 490 were sent as part of Commonwealth forces.

On 31 December 1900, the day before Federation, a survey of the strength of colonial forces found that the South Australian colonial forces consisted of 135 officers and 2,797 other ranks. Following South Australia's admission to the Commonwealth of Australia, all of the South Australian forces were drawn into the Australian Army. The 1st Battalion of the Regiment of Adelaide Rifles was redesignated as the 10th Australian Infantry Regiment (Adelaide Rifles), the 2nd Battalion became the South Australia Infantry Regiment, 'G' Company became the South Australia Scottish Infantry (Mount Gambier), and 'H' Company Scottish became 'G' Company (Scottish) South Australia Infantry Regiment. The artillery was also reorganised, with 'A' Battery becoming No. 1 South Australian Battery, Australian Field Artillery.

=== Victoria ===
The first attempt to establish a settlement in what is now Victoria was made by David Collins who departed from England in April 1803, aboard HMS Calcutta with orders to establish a colony at Port Phillip. It proved to be unsuitable and as a result was subsequently removed to Van Diemen's Land. Several journeys and explorers passed the northern coast of Bass Strait in the interim, but it was not until John Batman journeyed from Van Diemen's Land in 1835 to establish a farming community at what was to become Melbourne that the new colony was established. The new settlement's prime locality between New South Wales and Van Diemen's Land, and the natural resources of the area saw it grow rapidly. Initially the settlement was governed directly from Sydney, but by 1840, it was proposed that it should be self-governing. This was achieved on 1 July 1851.

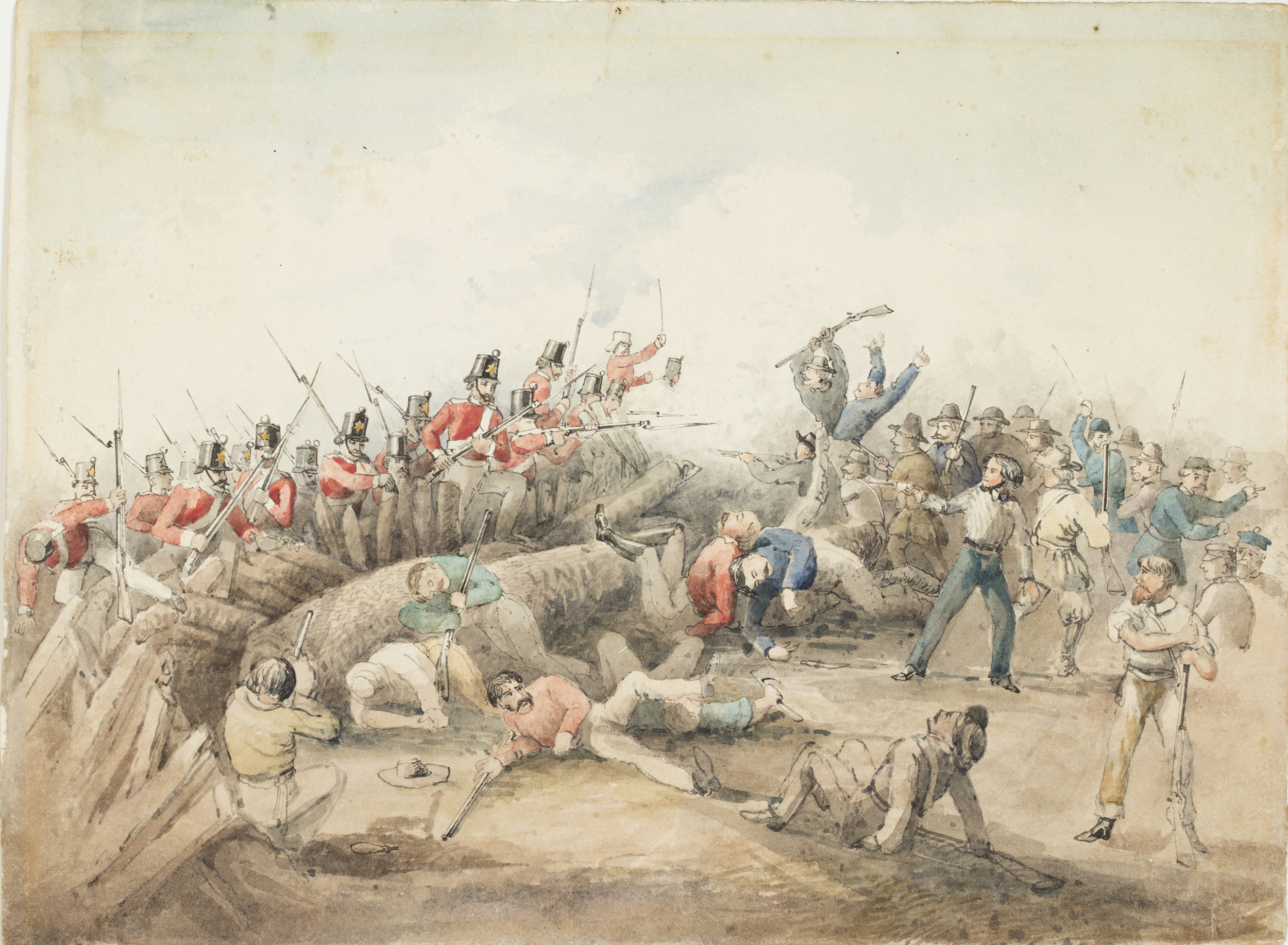
Troops storm the Eureka Stockade, December 1854

Although there had been some plans to form local forces as early as 1824, these came to nothing and as a result, as with New South Wales, in Victoria the Crimean War served as a catalyst for the raising of volunteer forces. With only a small force of British troops in the colony, there were concerns about a possible Russian attack. As a result, at this time two units were formed, these being the Melbourne Volunteer Rifle Regiment and the Geelong Volunteer Rifle Corps. (Note: There is some discrepancy in the sources regarding these units. Odgers groups them together as the Victorian Volunteer Rifle Regiment.) Other branches of service, such as cavalry, artillery, engineers, signals and torpedo units (Note: During the period before Federation the term "torpedo" was generally applied to weapons that would today be considered to be "sea mines" and were generally operated by engineer units.) were raised after this, with the funding for many of these units being derived from private sources. These forces included the Victorian Yeomanry Corps.

In late December 1854 the newly formed Victorian Government faced their first crisis. Three years earlier, in 1851, gold had been discovered in Ballarat, and soon after in Bendigo, triggering the Victorian gold rush. The government imposed heavy mining taxes, which caused a miners revolt, culminating in the Eureka Stockade. About 1,000 miners fortified a position, and at 3:00 am on 3 December 1854, a party of 276 members from the 1st/12th and 2nd/40th Regiments supported by Victorian police, under the command of Captain John Thomas, approached the Eureka Stockade and a battle ensued. The police took up holding positions on two sides of the stockade, with a further unit of mounted police held in reserve. On a third side mounted members of the 2nd/40th pressed in, supported by a combined storming party made up from members of the 2nd/40th and the 1st/12th Foot East Suffolk which approached from the north and south. The miners, about 150 strong – of whom 100 were armed – were no match for the military and they were routed in less than 15 minutes, with six soldiers and 34 miners being killed. A contingent of the 1st/99th Regiment, then serving in Tasmania, was dispatched to aid them, however they were not required. The result of this action was the effect that it had on public opinion surrounding the issue of the British garrison's presence in Australia; a gathering of citizens in Melbourne shortly after the incident at Eureka expressed a desire for the creation of a "constitution under which there would be no troops in the colony but for part-time citizens soldiers recruited from among the community".

When the Crimean War ended in 1856, many of the local units that had been raised declined as the enthusiasm of Victorians for military service dwindled. Around this time, the rifle regiments and corps that had been raised were converted to artillery. When British troops began to be redirected from the Australian colonies to New Zealand in the early 1860s there was renewed interest in Victoria for raising local forces to take over more of the responsibility for garrison duties. From 1861 Victorian forces undertook annual training at Easter with the first camp being undertaken at Werribee. The Volunteer Act 1863 (27 Vict. No. 183) was passed, and this legislation allowed the government to raise a voluntary force consisting of various arms including infantry and artillery. There were around 13 companies of infantry volunteers in Victoria at this time, From 1863 all mounted troops in Victoria became part of the Prince of Wales' Light Horse. By December 1863, along with the 13 companies of infantry, there was one company of engineers and seven of artillery.

In 1870, the Victorian Permanent Artillery Corps, consisting of about 300 men, was raised. The colony's first permanent, or "regular" unit, it was created to take over responsibility for manning the fortifications that the British garrison had occupied prior to their departure. They were also used to instruct volunteer artillery units. Throughout the rest of the decade, Victoria's military remained roughly the same size, although it obtained higher levels of efficiency as training opportunities were expanded and its organisation was improved. By the time that the British garrison was withdrawn in 1871, the Victorian military consisted of 206 permanent troops and 4,084 militia and volunteers. The following year, the various volunteer rifle companies were re-organised, being placed into battalion-level structures which saw the establishment of two metropolitan battalions, as well as a battalion in Ballarat and another in Mount Alexander. In January 1879, a survey of the colony's military forces determined that there were 228 permanent staff, all of which were serving in the artillery, and 3,202 volunteers serving in the cavalry, engineers, artillery and infantry.

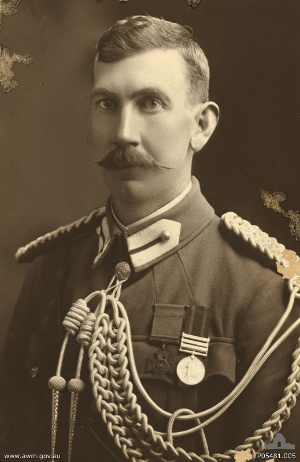
Leslie Maygar, a Victorian recipient of the Victoria Cross during the Boer War

In 1880 the permanent artillery units were disbanded, but were later reformed in 1882 as the Victorian Garrison Artillery Corps. In 1884, the volunteer system was abolished and in its place a partially paid militia, who were obligated to serve for a minimum number of days each year, was established. With the exception of these changes, the others that occurred at this time were largely administrative and most units that existed before 1884 remained in existence. The following year, the Victorian Mounted Rifles – who were the first unit to adopt the iconic slouch hat – were formed, primarily recruiting in rural areas where men had already established horsemanship skills and thus did not need further training and were able to provide and maintain their own horse. In late 1888 or early 1889, the Victorian Rangers, a rural infantry unit, was also raised. Both rural units were not paid well, but did receive small allowances, and were made up primarily of members of local rifle clubs.

On 20 September 1889, Alexander Bruce Tulloch was appointed Commandant of the Victorian Military Forces, with the local rank of Major-General.

In the early 1890s, economic hardships reduced the ability of many volunteer units to maintain regular attendance. Nevertheless, at the start of the decade the Victorian Mounted Rifles were used by the Victorian government to provide assistance to police during a maritime strike.

In December 1892, men of the Echuca Company of the Victorian Rangers nearly sparked an inter-colonial incident between New South Wales and Victoria, by accepting an invitation to cross the colonial border of the Murray River to nearby Moama, to attend a patriotic march. However, crossing the border in uniform and under arms would have legally constituted an "invasion", and would have been in contravention of the military law of both colonies. Despite the social context of the event, and the nature of the Rangers' acceptance, the incident upset members of both colonies' governments, who were opposed to either colony allowing troops from the other to enter their territory. The event was defused without incident, but served to highlight how tense the colonies were about defence at the time. Eventually permission was granted for the men to enter New South Wales, and they performed marches and manoeuvres in front of a large reception.

By 1896, Victoria boasted the largest artillery arsenal of all the Australian colonies, possessing nineteen 12-pounder BL guns, six 12-pounder rifled breech loaders (RBLs) and another six 6-pounders of the same type. The Victorian Scottish Regiment was formed in 1898 as a volunteer unit, and by 1901 other infantry units in the Victorian forces consisted of five battalions of militia, as well as the Victorian Rangers and the Victorian Railways Infantry, both of which were volunteer units.

Upon the outbreak of the Boer War in South Africa on 12 October 1899, men volunteered for active service from every Australian colony. Victoria's contribution was second only to New South Wales in size, and comprised 193 officers and 3,372 men of other ranks. The Victorian contingent was involved in a remarkable victory when 50 men from the Victorian Bushmen were involved in the Battle of Elands River in July 1900. One Victorian, Lieutenant Leslie Maygar, received the Victoria Cross during the conflict.

On 31 December 1900, the day before Federation, a survey of the strength of colonial forces found that the Victorian colonial forces consisted of 301 officers and 6,034 other ranks. Shortly after Federation, on 1 March 1901, the units of the Victorian forces were transferred to the Australian Army.

=== Queensland ===
The colony of Queensland came into being on 6 June 1859, when it was established as a separate entity from New South Wales. The task of raising a military force for the new colony was commenced shortly after this and the first formation, a troop of mounted rifles, was established in early 1860. Together with a small amount of infantry and artillery, the colony's military forces totalled about 250 men at this time, who were based primarily in Brisbane and Ipswich. Although they were maintained through the volunteer system, these soldiers were partially paid through a system of subsidies and grants that were provided to enable them to buy the equipment and ammunition required to perform their duties.

The Queensland Rifle Association (QRA) was formed on 15 May 1861. Although the Rifle Association was independent of the Queensland Volunteer Force, it was formed largely to hone the marksmanship of the Volunteer Force. The relationship between the Queensland Rifle Association and the military continued for almost a century, being formally dissolved in 1960 when Australian Army funding for competition prizes and ammunition was withdrawn.

In 1867, the Spring Hill and Fortitude Valley Volunteer Rifle Corps was raised.

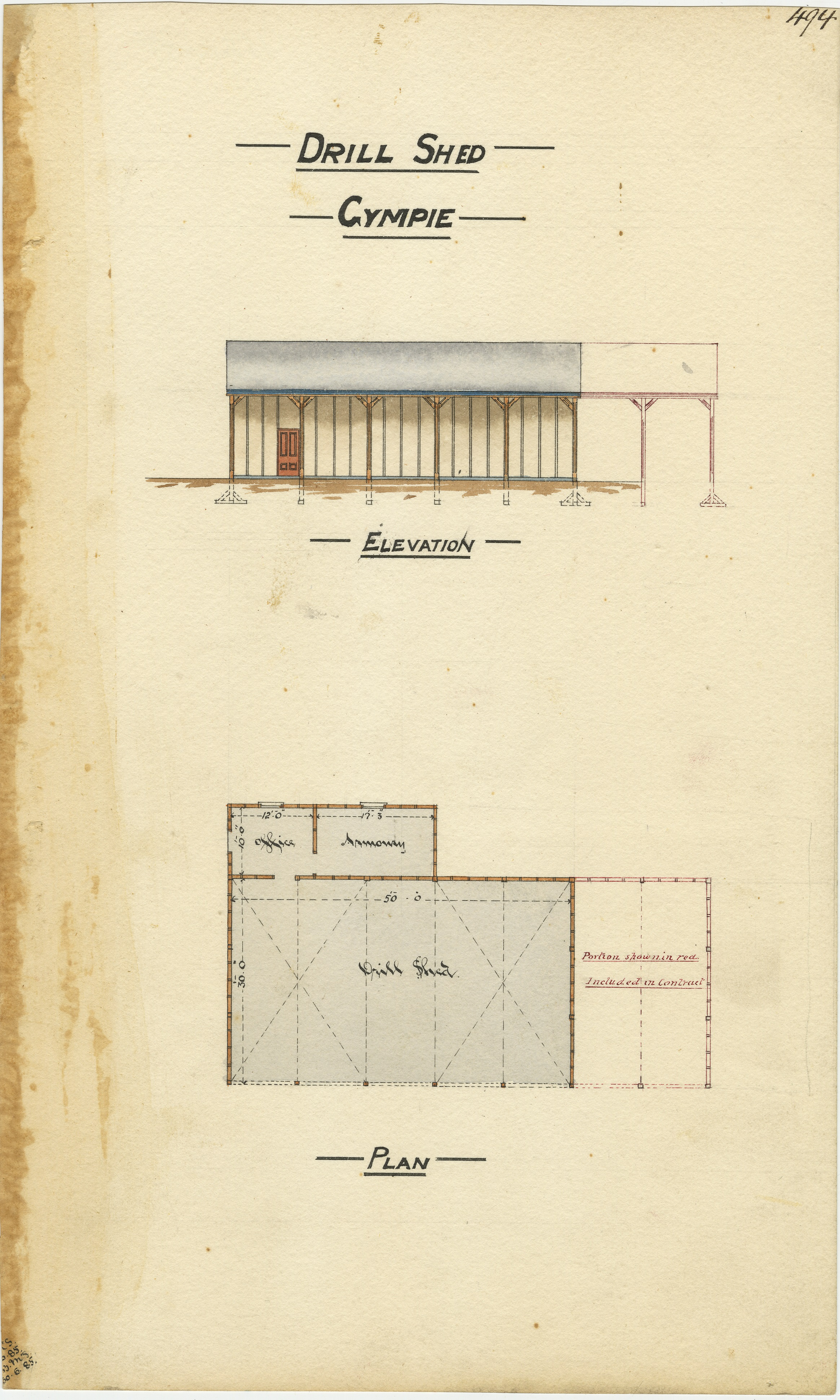
Architectural drawing of the Drill Shed, Gympie, 1885

In order to encourage men to serve, land grants of 50 acres (200,000 m^{2}) were provided for soldiers who completed five years. Nevertheless, the colony's military force grew only marginally; by 1876 there were 415 men under arms in the colony's service. These were distributed across two batteries of artillery in Brisbane and Ipswich, some Brisbane-based engineers and six companies of infantry in Brisbane, Ipswich, Warwick, Rockhampton and Toowoomba. In an effort to rectify the lack of manpower, Queensland passed the Volunteer Act in 1878. Within two years the size of the force had grown to 1,219 men. That same year, 1880, payments to volunteers for attending annual camps were stopped.

British forces had been stationed at Somerset on Cape York between 1865 and 1867 because of the recognised strategic importance of the Torres Strait to the Australian colonies as a whole. After their withdrawal, Queensland maintained a token force there, but it was widely recognised as inadequate to prevent any serious threat. A fortified coaling station and a more serious force was raised to be stationed upon Thursday Island in 1877. Later, in the early 1890s, more serious moves would be taken to garrison the island as part of a concerted effort by all six colonies to protect a number of strategic points around the Australian continent. Queensland's part in this was to contribute financially, along with Western Australia, New South Wales, Victoria and South Australia, to the purchase of the three 6-inch guns that were installed on the island, and also to provide the 30-man garrison from their permanent artillery force.

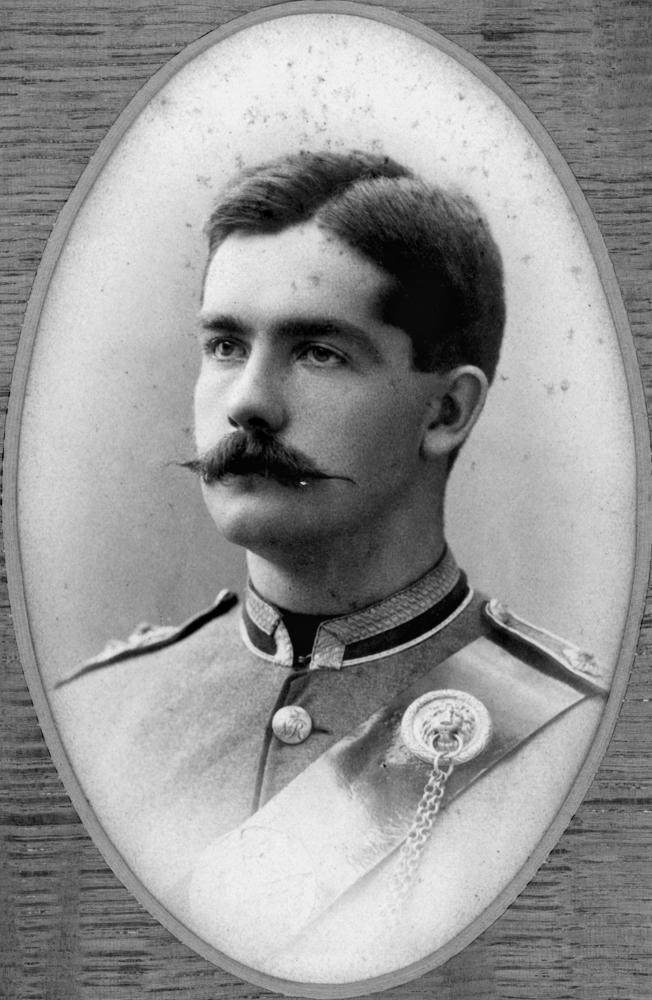
Lieutenant Richard Dowse of the Queensland Volunteer Rifles, 1889

Throughout the early 1880s it became apparent that the volunteer system was not effective in meeting the colony's defence needs. As a result, a committee was established to review the situation. The inquiry found that Queensland's military force "lacked cohesion and discipline", recommending that the force should be maintained through a combination of volunteers and militia. These recommendations were not initially implemented, however, in 1884 a "dual system" was created when the Volunteer Act was repealed and, under the provisions of the newly enacted Queensland Defence Act, a militia was established into which all males between certain ages became liable to be conscripted if required. This militia, a partially paid force, was established in the metropolitan areas of the colony, while unpaid volunteer units continued to exist in rural areas. A reserve of officers was also created at this time, which could be drawn upon in times of conflict. Three militia infantry units came into being as a result of this development, the Moreton, Wide Bay and Burnett, and Kennedy Regiments; these were supported by three volunteer units, the Queensland Volunteer Rifles, the Queensland Scottish Volunteers and the Queensland Irish Volunteers.

Around the same time the Queensland government felt alarmed by the threat of the expansion by the German colony of German New Guinea, and believed that by securing the southeastern quarter of the island of New Guinea, they could provide more safety for shipping through the Torres Strait. As a result, in April 1883 the colony annexed the Territory of Papua for the British Empire. The British government, opposed to further colonial expansion, initially repudiated the action, but a firmer commitment by the Australian colonial governments eventually led to southern New Guinea (Papua) being declared an official British protectorate on 6 November 1884. In response, Germany annexed the northern portion the following month, expanding Kaiser-Wilhelmsland.

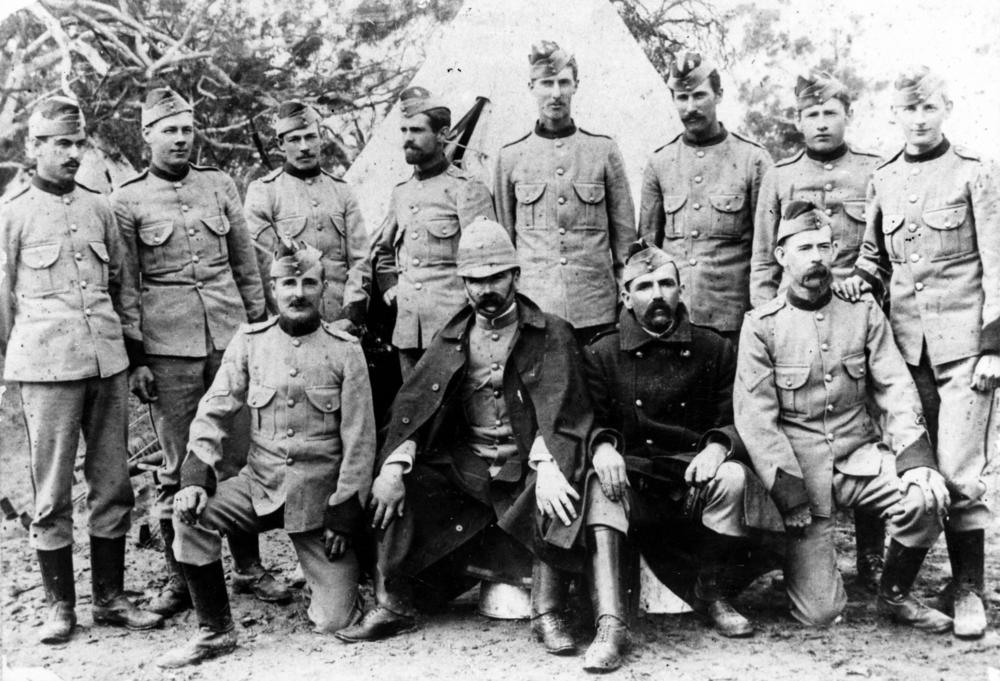
Queensland Defence Forces, Fort Lytton, 1893

That same year Queensland provided for its first permanent forces. These came in the form of a permanent artillery battery, designated 'A' Battery, which was authorised in December 1884 and raised the following March. That year, 1885, in response to concerns about a possible war with Russia due to tensions between that nation and the British in India, Queensland forces were called up for continuous service over the Easter period, exercising at Fort Lytton.

In 1889, as part of Edwards' review of colonial military forces, the Queensland artillery exercised at Fort Lytton and engineers demonstrated their capability by detonating a number of submarine mines. Edwards was sufficiently impressed, concluding that the colony's forces were "fairly satisfactory", although he stopped short of stating that they were efficient. By 1891–92, the colony's military force consisted of 91 permanent soldiers, 3,133 militia and 841 volunteers.

This progress was lost, however, in the early part of the following decade as the Australian colonies were gripped by an economic depression which had the effect of reducing the amount of money spent on defence. Although the defence force was mobilised in 1891 to quell a shearers' strike, austerity measures resulted in the cancellation of the annual camp in 1893 and the disbandment of a number of units. The following year, the permanent artillery, which had been sent to garrison Thursday Island, was reduced, however, by 1895 the situation had improved and defence spending was increased again and Queensland's permanent artillery was again expanded. Recruitment into the foot and mounted infantry increased at this time also. A survey of field gun holdings in the colony in 1896 showed that there were four 12-pounder BL guns, twelve 9-pounder RMLs and five 12-pounder RBLs.

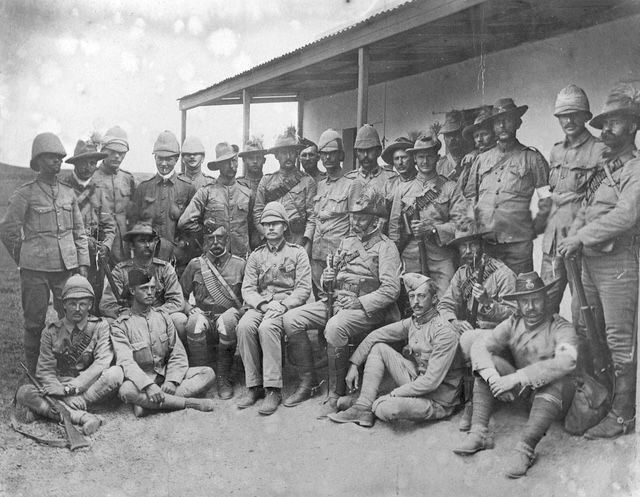
British and Australian officers, including men from the Queensland Mounted Infantry, in South Africa

In July 1899, as tensions between British and Boer settlers in South Africa grew, Queensland pledged a force of 250 men in the event of war. The Boer War subsequently broke out on 11 October 1899 and over the course of the conflict Queensland contributed the third largest force of all the colonies, consisting of 733 troops provided at State expense and 1,419 at Imperial expense, who served in the Queensland Mounted Infantry and Queensland Imperial Bushmen. Following Federation, a further 736 Queenslanders would serve in Commonwealth units. Troops from the Queensland Mounted Infantry were involved in the first significant Australian action of the war when they took part in an attack on a Boer "laager" at Sunnyside on 1 January 1900, during which they lost two men killed and two wounded.

On 31 December 1900, the day before Federation, a survey of the strength of colonial forces found that Queensland's colonial forces consisted of 291 officers and 3,737 other ranks. On 1 March 1901, Queensland's military personnel came under the control of the Australian Army. These included three multi-battalion militia infantry regiments and two single-battalion militia infantry regiments, and two volunteer units, the Queensland Rifles and the Queensland Teachers Corps.

==== Surviving structures of the Queensland colonial armies ====
A number of structures from the Queensland colonial armies still survive and are heritage listed, including:

- Drill Shed in Fortitude Valley, Brisbane
- Fort Lytton and Lytton Hill Signal Station in Lytton, Brisbane
- Drill Hall in Southport, Gold Coast
- Kissing Point Fortification and North Ward Defence Complex in North Ward, Townsville

== Notes ==
Footnotes

Citations
