= Southport Drill Hall =

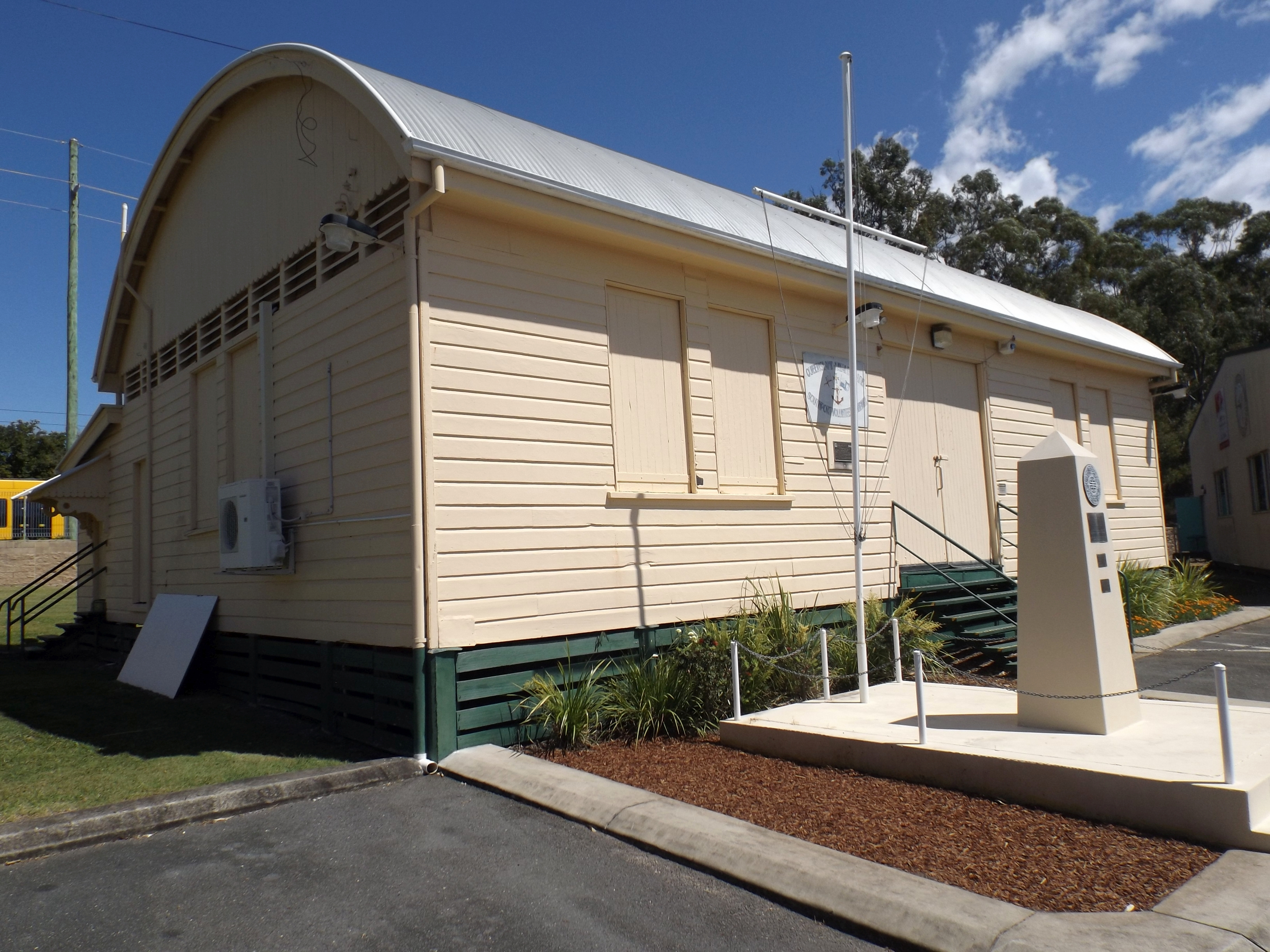
- Building in 2015

- Location within Queensland Location within Australia
- 27.9709°S 153.4023°E
- Location: 201 Queen Street, Southport, Queensland, Australia

History
- Design period: 1870s–1890s (late 19th century)
- Built: 1890

Site notes
- Architect: George Connolly

Queensland Heritage Register
- Official name: Southport Drill Hall, Southport Drill Shed
- Type: state heritage (built)
- Designated: 5 October 1998
- Reference no.: 601479
- Significant period: c. 1890 (fabric); 1890s–1980s (historical)
- Significant components: objects (movable) – defence
- Builders: John Fortune

Southport Drill Hall is a heritage-listed drill hall at 210 Queen Street, Southport, Queensland, Australia. It was designed by George Connolly and built in 1890 by John Fortune. It is also known as Southport Drill Shed. It was added to the Queensland Heritage Register on 5 October 1998.

== History ==
The Southport Drill Hall was constructed in 1890 as the Southport Drill Shed to the specifications of George Connolly of the Queensland Colonial Architect's office. Although moved from its original site in Lawson Street, Southport, the building has retained a strong association with various defence related agencies.

On 10 December 1859 Queensland separated from New South Wales and became responsible for the defence of its territory. At the time, the population of the state was about 25,000 and the new Colony of Queensland was without any type of defence, and initially the services of the Brisbane and Ipswich Troops of the Queensland Mounted Rifles were utilised. By 1862, Volunteer Defence Forces had been instigated in several areas of the state and in 1867 Governor Sir George Bowen agreed to the formation of a Volunteer Rifle Corps on the condition that the group would finance themselves. The Spring Hill and Fortitude Valley Volunteer Rifle Corps (No. 3 Company) were amongst the first to come into being with Charles Lilley as the commanding officer. In 1876, as the fear of invasion from mounting European tensions was felt, the New South Wales Colonial Secretary, in association with several other mainland colonies including Queensland sought military advice from Britain. Lieutenant General Sir William Francis Drummond Jervois furnished the colonies with advice for each colony on fortifications, artillery, naval defence and manpower.

He expressed his pleasure at having held a review which, considering the disadvantages under which the Volunteer force had laboured, had been fairly conducted. He believed the force had a good deal to learn before they could expect to meet an enemy on anything like equal terms; with regard to artillery they would have to learn to use heavier ordnance than that with which they were practising and would consequently, like the rifle corps, require more instruction in drill.

Despite the recommendations, financial provision for the voluntary defence force remained inadequate until new Volunteer Regulations were passed in October 1882. Funding and support for the defence forces ensued. To accommodate the revitalised forces thus formed, drill halls were to be constructed and used as training facilities. These halls were designed to a standard planned and erected at strategic focal points of military strategy. The focal points recommended included those at local harbours and rivers, particularly where enemy warships may find entry. A good example of such a place was found at the South Passage at Southport, where river traffic between Brisbane and Southport also required protection. The passing of the Defence Act in 1884 saw the establishment of a permanent military force and a militia along with the already established volunteer corps.

A Southport Corps was formed from the Southport branch of the Queensland Volunteer Rifle Infantry and this was converted to a militia in 1887. In April 1885 a Southport Cadet Corps had been established. In the 1880s the popularity of Southport as a seaside holiday destination surged. Southport developed as an alternate resort when Sandgate became more accessible with the introduction of the Sandgate rail line in 1882. Logging in the Southport area had commenced in the late 1850s, and by 1875 the first sales of land opened the area for settlement. By the 1880s Southport become the principal sea-side resort in Queensland. The construction of major schools, banks and hotels stimulated Southport's growth as a fashionable nineteenth century resort as did the presence of the Governor's residence in the 1890s. The South Coast railway line, an extension from Beenleigh to Southport, was opened in 1889 making Southport more accessible from Brisbane.

With increasing popularity of the area, and organisation of the military strategy a drill hall was constructed at Southport in 1890 on a military reserve in Lawson Street. This was a simple rectangular planned timber building housing a large open hall and abutting this a row of small rooms one an office and the other armouries for the three companies who trained in the building. The Drill Shed was completed in about November 1890 for a cost of £335/2/- by Coomera builder, John Fortune. The building was designed and construction administered by the Queensland Colonial Architect's Office of the Department of Works. Apparently George Connolly was the architect for the project. It is unclear whether the design was in fact a standard plan used for other drill halls although others constructed at this time, including that planned for Warwick (1888) were very similar. The design of the new Southport Drill Shed was in line with the maxim that military architecture was, above all else, functional, designed to maximise the safety and efficiency of personnel and their work. The timber used for the building was cypress pine and the curved, corrugated iron clad roof, was supported on wrought iron trusses. The windows were shaded with central pivoted timber shutters and a series of galvanised iron fixed louvre panels ensured cross ventilation. When finished the timberwork was painted white and included a detached toilet and fencing. Repairs and restoration were carried out in 1899, prior to the building reverting to Australian Government ownership following Federation of Australia.

Although the Southport Drill Hall has sustained a long association with various Australian defence forces, it has been used for other community purposes. The first such use occurred in 1910 when permission was given to the Southport Agricultural and Horticultural Society to use the building during Carnival Week. Prior to 1910 the hall was only to be used for military purposes. Following World War I the Australian military forces were reduced and the drill hall was leased firstly to a Boy Scout Group and then, from 1931 to the Southport Surf Lifesaving Club. The outbreak of World War II saw the Australian Government reclaiming exclusive use of the Drill Hall and it remained in military use until 1988. The building was then left vacant until 1990 when it was used for the Queensland Naval Brigade Southport Volunteer Company.

In about 1995 the Southport Drill Hall was moved from its original site in Lawson Street to site in Owen Park, Queen Street, Southport. Owen Park, formerly a showgrounds, houses a number of other timber buildings moved from various parts of Southport. The Drill Shed remains substantially intact both internally and externally.

== Description ==
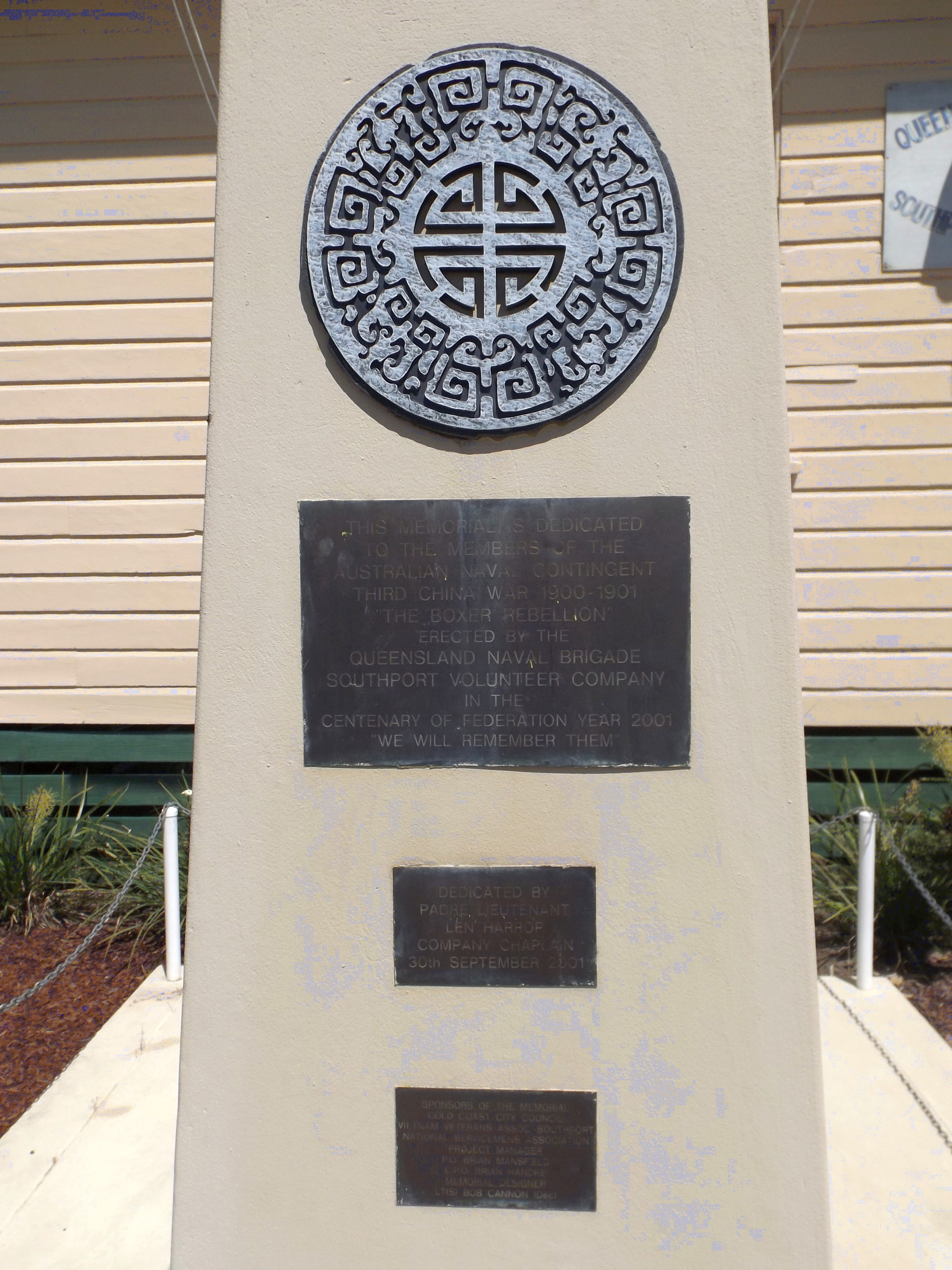
Plaque, 2015

The Southport Drill Hall is a timber building situated on the southern side of Owen Park, Southport, among a number of other timber buildings. The building is of single skinned construction, timber framed and clad externally with chamfered boards and elevated on concrete stumps. The corrugated iron clad roof comprises a curved section over the main hall abutting a skillion roof over a row of offices. The curved section is supported on curved wrought iron trusses and the curved sections of the end walls have high level fixed louvre ventilation panels (now clad internally with sheeting) above which is vertical boarding. The northern face of the building houses the principal entrance through a large double timber boarded door. Flanking the door are two large double unglazed window openings which are protected with timber boarded shutters. Centrally located on the two ends of the building is a similar double window opening protected with timber shutters. The southern face of the building, where the offices are located, has four small vertical sash windows regularly spaced along the face of the building.

Internally, the building comprises a large open space from which access is provided to four small rooms in a row on the southern side of the building. Separating the smaller rooms from the large central room is a single skinned timber boarded partition. External access is provided to the easternmost office via an external open tread timber stair of four steps shades by an ornate awning supported on fretwork brackets. The large internal room is open to the wrought iron roof trusses. This room houses ephemera and fittings from the Queensland Naval Brigade Southport Volunteer Company who now use the building and retains a strong sense of its military history.

== Heritage listing ==
Southport Drill Hall was listed on the Queensland Heritage Register on 5 October 1998 having satisfied the following criteria.

The place is important in demonstrating the evolution or pattern of Queensland's history.

The building demonstrates the strategic military importance of coastal areas, like Southport in the late nineteenth century and has a strong association with the Volunteer Defence Force.

The place demonstrates rare, uncommon or endangered aspects of Queensland's cultural heritage.

The building, contracted in 1890 to a standard design furnished by the State Department of Works, is an example of a standard nineteenth century drill hall of which many were constructed and very few are known to survive in their original form.

The place is important in demonstrating the principal characteristics of a particular class of cultural places.

The building, contracted in 1890 to a standard design furnished by the State Department of Works, is an example of a standard nineteenth century drill hall many of which were constructed and very few are known to survive in their original form.

The place has a special association with the life or work of a particular person, group or organisation of importance in Queensland's history.

The building demonstrates the strategic military importance of coastal areas, like Southport in the late nineteenth century and has a strong association with the Volunteer Defence Force.
