= 1879 Birthday Honours =

Appointments by Queen Victoria to various orders and honours

The 1879 Birthday Honours were appointments by Queen Victoria to various orders and honours to reward and highlight good works by citizens of the British Empire. The appointments were made to celebrate the official birthday of the Queen, and were published in The London Gazette on 24 May 1879.

The recipients of honours are displayed here as they were styled before their new honour, and arranged by honour, with classes (Knight, Knight Grand Cross, etc.) and then divisions (Military, Civil, etc.) as appropriate.

== United Kingdom and British Empire ==
=== The Most Distinguished Order of Saint Michael and Saint George ===
Star of the Order of Saint Michael and Saint George

==== Knight Grand Cross of the Order of St Michael and St George (GCMG) ====
- The Right Honourable Lord Lyons GCB DCL Her Majesty's Ambassador Extraordinary and Plenipotentiary to the French Republic
- The Right Honourable Lord Odo William Leopold Russell GCB Her Majesty's Ambassador Extraordinary and Plenipotentiary to His Majesty the German Emperor, King of Prussia
- Sir Antonio Micallef KCMG President of the Court of Appeal in the Island of Malta

==== Knight Commander of the Order of St Michael and St George (KCMG) ====
- Sir Narcisse-Fortunat Belleau Kt formerly Lieutenant-Governor of Quebec
- William Taylour Thomson CB late Her Majesty's Envoy Extraordinary and Minister Plenipotentiary to His Majesty the Shah of Persia
- William Pearce Howland CB formerly Lieutenant-Governor of the Province of Ontario
- Charles Tupper CB Minister of Public Works for the Dominion of. Canada
- Samuel Leonard Tilley CB Minister of Finance for the Dominion of Canada
- George Buckley Mathew CB late Her Majesty's Envoy Extraordinary and Minister-Plenipotentiary to His Majesty the Emperor of Brazil
- George Welsh Kellner CSI late Financial Commissioner in Cyprus
- Major-General Edward Wolstenholme Ward CMG late Deputy Master of the Branch Mint at Sydney
- Dr. Ferdinand von Mueller CMG Government Botanist, Victoria
- George Brown, Member of the Senate of the Dominion of Canada
- Alexander Campbell, Receiver-General of the Dominion of Canada
- Richard John Cartwright, lately Finance Minister of the Dominion of Canada
- Edward William Stafford, formerly Prime Minister of New Zealand
- William Fox, formerly Prime Minister of New Zealand

Honorary Knight Commander

- His Excellency Rachad Pacha, late Governor of Gallipoli

==== Companion of the Order of St Michael and St George (CMG) ====
- James Armstrong, Chief Justice of the Island of Saint Lucia
- Colonel Henry Wray, Royal Engineers, lately Commanding Royal Engineers in Malta, and specially employed in directing the Drainage Works of Malta
- Colonel Peter Henry Scratchley, Royal Engineers, specially employed in Superintending Works of Defence in the Australian Colonies
- Lieutenant-Colonel John Terence Nicolls O'Brien, Inspector-General of Police, Mauritius
- Major John Frederick Adolphus McNair RA Colonial Engineer and Surveyor-General, Straits Settlements
- Christopher Rolleston, Auditor-General of New South Wales
- Edward Richardson, formerly Minister of Public Works, New Zealand
- William James Mudie Larnach, lately Treasurer of New Zealand
- Thomas Berkeley Hardtman-Berkeley, Member of the Executive Council of Saint Christopher and Vice-President of the Federal Council of the Leeward Islands
- William Brandford Griffith, Auditor-General, Barbados
- Patrick Jennings, Executive Commissioner for the Industrial Exhibition, New South Wales
- Joseph Henderson, of Natal, selected as Commissioner to inquire into the Finances of the Transvaal
- Hugh Low, British Resident at Perak, in the Malay Peninsula
- George Bentham FRS FLS of Victoria, author of the Flora Australiensis
