= Fort Largs =

Former Fort in Australia

- Location within Australia
- Location: South Australia, Adelaide
- Coordinates: 34°48′36″S 138°29′38″E

Fort Largs is a historic defence site in the coastal suburb of Taperoo near Port Adelaide, South Australia, approximately 18 km (11 mi) north west of Adelaide's city centre.

Fort Largs was built as a coastal battery installment in 1885, responsible for Adelaide's coastal defence. In the 1960s it was repurposed for use as the police academy of the South Australia Police, a role it fulfilled until 2012. In 2014, the site was put up for redevelopment, sparking heritage protests. In June 2016, it was announced the site would be redeveloped for 250 homes; the fort would remain intact, with the barracks converted to apartments and the drill hall converted to a community centre.

== History ==
In the late 1800s, visits of Russian ships in South Australian waters were of a friendly nature, but the Russo-Turkish War of 1877–1878 was seen by Britain as part of a potential expansion plan by the Russian Empire into India, and the Australian colonies were advised to upgrade their defence capabilities. The inadequacy of defences in the colony was seen in 1862, when the Svetlana sailed into Port Phillip and Fort Queenscliff had no gunpowder for its cannons to use to return a salute. William Jervois, a Royal Engineer, was commissioned to determine the defence capabilities of all colonies, with the exception of Western Australia. In his report, he was convinced that the Russian Empire would attack South Australian shipping in an attempt to destroy the local economy. As a result of Jervois' report, Fort Glanville and Fort Largs were built to protect Port Adelaide.

Lieutenant Colonel Peter Scratchley was primarily responsible for the design of both Fort Largs and its nearby precursor Fort Glanville. Work began in 1882 on what was first known as the Port Adelaide battery, to the same specification as Fort Glanville. Its barracks and rear defence wall were finished in 1885. Emphasis for defence of the Adelaide coast had shifted to Fort Largs by 1888. In 1889, Fort Largs was equipped with two 6-inch breech-loading disappearing guns which outranged Glanville's armament. Due to this and changes in the Port River and shipping movements, Fort Largs had surpassed Fort Glanville in strategic importance by 1890. In 1984, the fort was entered as a state heritage place in the South Australian Heritage Register.

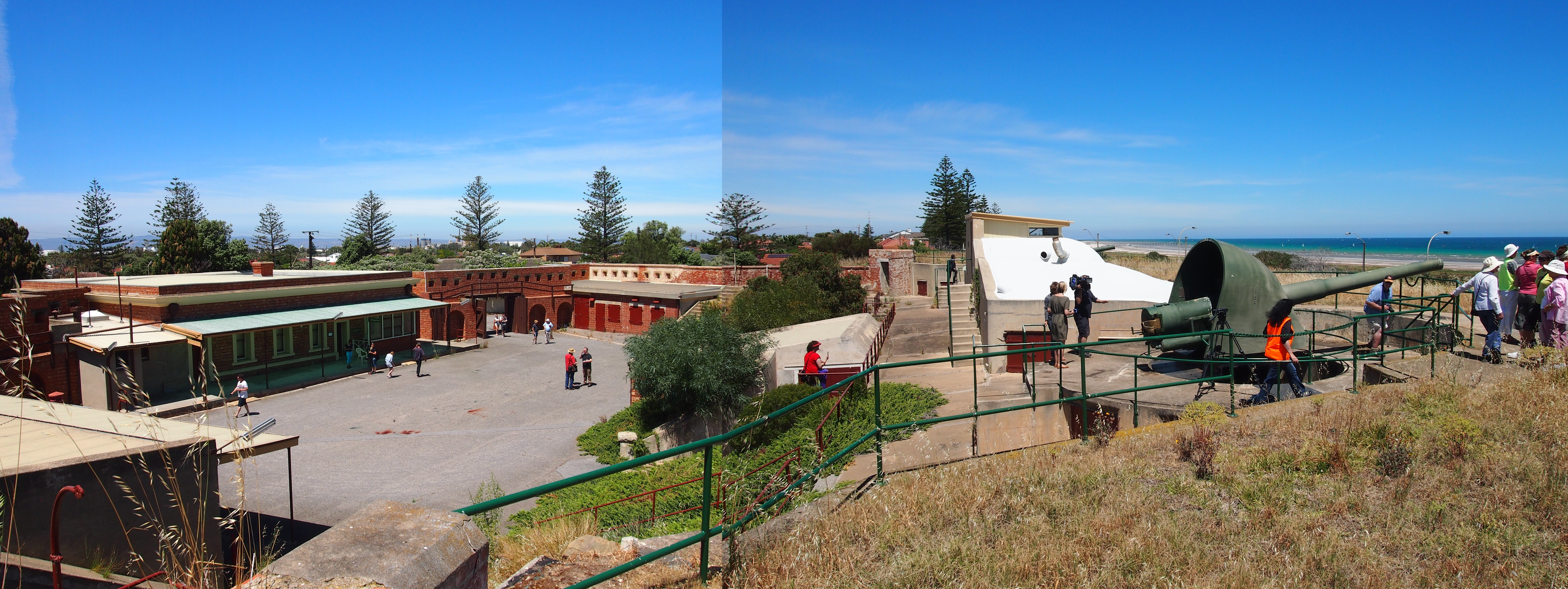
Panoramic view of Fort Largs, from the north

=== Barracks and drill hall ===
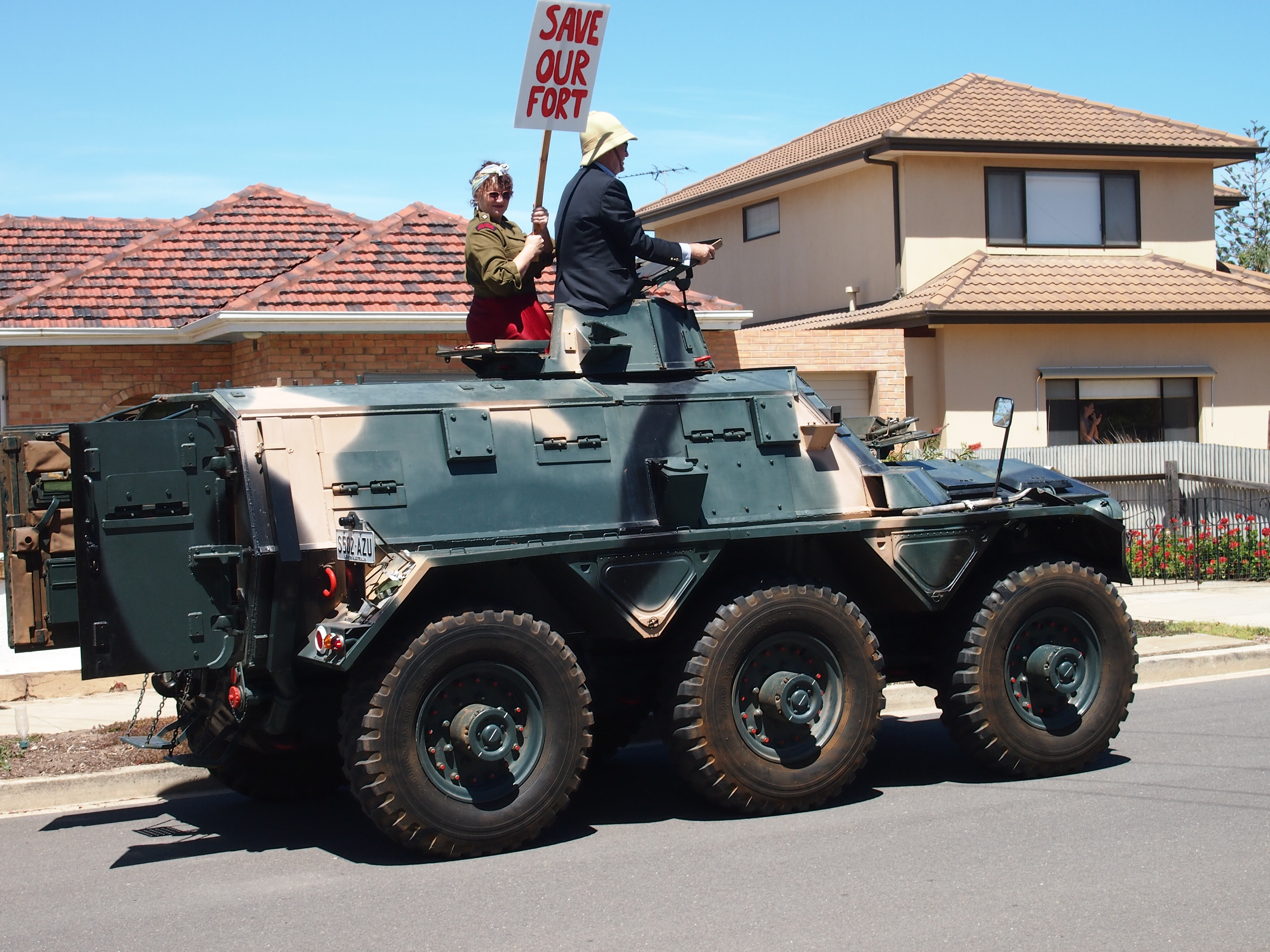
An Alvis Saracen in a community protest against the sale of Fort Largs, organised by the National Trust of SA, 25 October 2014.

In May 1939 construction began on a two-storied brick barracks for the artillery units based at Fort Largs, plus a brick drill hall for use of the militia. The barracks incorporated a commercial kitchen and mess room, orderly room, canteen and billiard room, and administration rooms. During World War II, BL 6-inch Mk VII naval guns were installed.

When the police occupied Fort Largs in 1961 that same disposition was continued for several decades. The barrack rooms were adapted into classrooms for cadet training. In April 2015, the barracks and drill hall were entered as a state heritage place on the South Australian Heritage Register.

=== Police academy ===
In the 1960s, a part of the original fort was adapted for use by the nearby South Australian Police academy, which was known as Fort Largs Police Academy, the main training facility for South Australia Police. In 2009, parts of the academy site were put up for sale, and the construction of new police academy housing began on a portion of the site, immediately east of the old fort. The old academy site has been disused since the 2012 opening of a newer police academy.

== Redevelopment ==
In 2012, new police academy housing was constructed on the east portion of the site. In 2014, the west portion of the site, including the historic defence constructions, was slated for redevelopment.

As of 2016, the Fort Largs site survives in slightly modified condition from its original state. Its tunnels, gun emplacements and storage areas are still largely original. A May 2015 fact sheet produced by Renewal SA stated that the 7.4 hectares (18 acres) of land to be redeveloped is zoned residential, but any development must not "jeopardise the preservation and maintenance of the Fort, Barracks and Drill Hall", which are included in the site to be redeveloped.

In June 2016, Renewal SA announced AVJennings as its preferred tenderer for the redevelopment of part of the site for about 250 homes, with the heritage-listed barracks to be converted to apartments, the drill hall to be retained as a community facility, and the historic fort to be owned and operated by the National Trust of SA.

== See also ==
- Fort Glanville
