= Chief Justice of St Lucia =

The chief justice of St Lucia was the head of the Supreme Court of St Lucia, an island member of the Windward Islands in the West Indies.

The court was replaced by the Windward and Leeward Islands Supreme Court and the Windward and Leeward Islands Court of Appeal in 1939; both in turn were replaced in 1967 by the Eastern Caribbean Supreme Court which performs both functions.

== List of chief justices ==
- 1824–1831 John Jeremie
- 1831 John Paynter Musson
- 1833–1836 Jeffery Hart Bent (afterwards Chief Justice of British Guiana, 1836)
- 1836–>1848 John Reddie
- 1850–1859 Sir Robert Bowcher Clarke (also Chief Justice of Barbados)
- 1859–>1869 John Grey Porter Atthill
- 1871–1881 James Sherrard Armstrong (also Chief Justice of Tobago, 1880)
- 1882–1889 Sir John Worrell Carrington (St Lucia and Tobago) (afterwards Attorney General of British Guiana)
- 1890–1902 Arthur Child
- 1903–1905 John Bayldon Walker
- 1906–1912 Percy Musgrave Cresswell Sheriff (afterwards Chief Justice of Bermuda, 1912)
- 1912–1919 Frank Herbert Coller
- 1919–1927 Sir Anthony de Freitas (afterwards Chief Justice of British Guiana, 1927)
- 1930–1934 Thomas William Savile Garraway
- 1934–1940 George Edward Fugl Richards
