= John Worrell Carrington =

British jurist

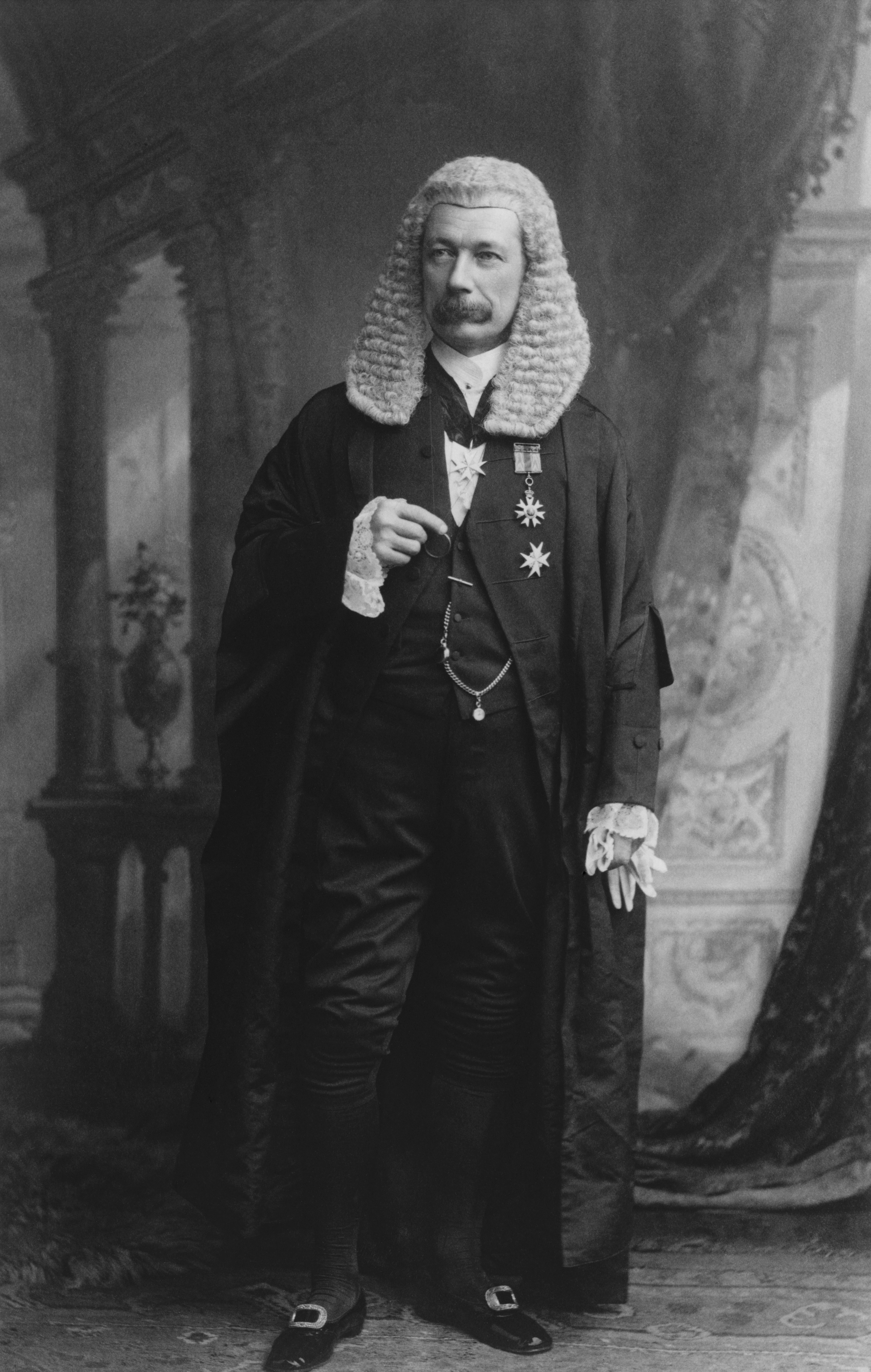
Sir John Worrell Carrington

Sir John Worrell Carrington, KB, CMG, KC, FRGS, , DCL, (29 May 1847 – 11 February 1913) was a British jurist, elected representative, and colonial administrator between 1872 and 1902. He served the Caribbean colonies of Barbados, St. Lucia, Tobago, Grenada, and British Guiana until his final appointment as Chief Justice of Hong Kong.

== Early life ==
Carrington was born in 1847 at St Joseph's parish on Barbados and was the fourth son of Thomas Worrell Carrington (1801–1855), a planter, of Industry Plantation. He had a dozen siblings and an older brother, George Carrington (1841–1891) who was also a lawyer in the firm of Messrs. Carrington and Sealy, Solicitors in Bridgetown St. Michael's.

He attended The Lodge School, and then was a scholar at Codrington College and was even known for having played one first-class cricket match for the island before he finished in 1866.

Carrington's mother, Christian Wharton Reed (1815–1883) was from an Oxfordshire family and his ties with Oxford were clearly strong. Like many fortunate Barbadian's often did when the island was part of the British West Indian colony, he had the opportunity to travel to and from England and to pursue his higher educated there at Lincoln College, Oxford, where he obtained a B.A. in 1872. Then, aged 22, he was called to the Bar at the Lincoln's Inn on 6 June 1872.

Carrington was awarded an Honorary D.C.L. by the University of Durham in 1879.

== Marriage and children ==
Four months after being called to the Bar, before returning to Barbados to begin his career in earnest, he married on 2 October 1872 in Oxford, Susan Catherine Walsh (1847–1928), the only daughter of William Walsh of Norham. The couple had five children, two sons and three daughters –

Catherine Worrell (1874–1946),

John Walsh (1879–1964),

Charles Worrell (1880–1948) - like his father, studied at Lincoln's Inn (1900), became Captain of the Grenadier Guards and was awarded the D.S.O.

Ruth Alice (1884–1897) and

Edward Worrell (1888-1915) was born in Oxford, also became a Captain (in RAMC) and was killed at the First Battle of Loos in 1915. He was awarded a posthumous Military Cross.

Most of these children were born at "The Farm" and "Norham" in Saint Michael parish on the island of Barbados.

== Legal appointments ==
After his return to Barbados Carrington was made a member of the House of Assembly from October 1874 to December 1878, when he was called to a seat in the legislative council, and acted a Judge Assistant at the Court of Appeal from 1874 to 1875 (a post he took again in 1879).

He was appointed Solicitor General of Barbados from 1877, acted as Attorney-General between 1881 and 1882, and then till 1889 he served as Chief Justice for several Caribbean governments. For Tobago (1883–1885) he was engaged in 1885–1886, under the sanction of the Colonial Office, in preparing and printing a draft revised edition of the Laws of Tobago, and in which capacity he was thanked by their Secretary of State and Governor-in-Charge for his services in connection with Education in that Colony. For St Lucia in 1888–1889 to create a new edition of their laws. For Grenada between August and October 1886.

Then, shortly after being granted a C.M.G. in 1888, once again Carrington was in the position of Attorney General now for British Guiana from 1889 to 1896, during which time he collated four volumes of The Laws of British Guiana (1774–1895) and was appointed a Queen's Counsel (1890).

In 1896, he took the appointment of Chief Justice of Hong Kong, presiding as the chief judge of the Supreme Court. Soon after his appointment, in 1897, he was knighted. He served as Chief Justice until 31 March 1902, when he retired on a pension. After stepping down, he prepared a revised edition of the ordinances of the colony.

He commanded the Hong Kong Volunteer Corps from 1896 to 1901 and was given a farewell parade in 1901.

== Retirement ==
Carrington retired due to ill health in March 1902, and left Hong Kong to live first at Oxford and later at Reading, England, where he died on 11 February 1913 at the age of 65.

Legal offices
Preceded by Sir Fielding Clarke	Chief Justice of Hong Kong; 1896–1902	Succeeded by Sir W Meigh Goodman
Preceded by James Sherrard Armstrong	Chief Justice of St Lucia; 1882–1889	Succeeded by Arthur Child
Preceded by James Sherrard Armstrong	Chief Justice of Tobago; 1882–1888	Succeeded by Chief Justice of Trinidad and Tobago
