= Hugh Hastings Romilly =

Hugh Hastings Romilly (1856–1892) was a British explorer in the Pacific, the third son of Colonel Frederick Romilly and Elizabeth, daughter of Gilbert Elliot, second earl of Minto. He was born in London on 15 March 1856, and, at first, educated at the Rev. C. A. Johns's school at Winchester, and then at Repton. He entered Christ Church, Oxford, on 10 October 1874, but took no degree, leaving to enter the business of Messrs. Melly & Co., merchants, of Liverpool.

He was of adventurous disposition, and joined in Fiji in October 1879 Sir Arthur Gordon, the governor. On 12 November he accompanied his chief to Tonga, and, in December, to Rotumah, in connection with the annexation of that island. He arrived again in Fiji on 17 April 1880, and returned to Rotumah on 18 September 1880 as deputy-commissioner on its annexation to the British crown.

In early 1881, owing to continued ill-health, he rejoined Sir Arthur Gordon, who had gone to New Zealand as governor, but in March he was appointed deputy-commissioner for the Western Pacific, and started for his first long tour through these seas in H.M.S. Beagle. He visited New Hanover, the Admiralty group, Hermit Islands, Astrolabe Bay in New Guinea, the Louisiade archipelago, Woodlark Islands, and the Trobriands. After a visit on sick leave to England, succeeded by a short stay in Fiji, he was ordered to New Guinea for the first time, at the end of 1883. In November 1884 he was one of the party which declared the British protectorate over part of New Guinea.

By some misunderstanding he hoisted the British flag in advance of the formal declaration of protectorate. He gave effective aid in the early administration of the new colony, and on the death of the chief administrator, Sir Peter Scratchley, he acted as administrator in charge of the settlement from December 1885 to the end of February 1886, but went to London in June to supervise the New Guinea exhibits at the Colonial and Indian Exhibition.

For these services he was created a C.M.G. On 17 Jan. 1887 he once again started for the Pacific, staying en route in Egypt and Australia, and in June took up the appointment of deputy-commissioner and consul of the New Hebrides and Solomon Islands, residing chiefly at Port Moresby, New Guinea. His task during 1888 and 1889 was peculiarly trying. There was a good deal of native hostility, and he was much isolated, owing largely, he believed, to the neglect of the home authorities. Finally, in 1890, he resigned his offices.

In 1891 Romilly went out to Africa in command of an expedition for the Northumberland Mining Syndicate, and travelled for some time in Mashonaland. While there he contracted fever, and, returning home, died at Cecil Street, Strand, London, on 27 July 1892. He was unmarried.

Romilly is described by Arthur Hamilton-Gordon, 1st Baron Stanmore as of "a quick intelligence, great physical strength, and an easy temper." His writings prove that he possessed all the qualifications for an explorer of new lands and a student of native ways. A portrait forms the frontispiece of the memoir by his brother, Samuel H. Romilly.

Romilly published: 1. A true Story of the Western Pacific in 1879–80, London, 1882 (2nd edit. with portrait, 1893). 2. The Western Pacific and New Guinea, London, 1886. 3. From my Verandah in New Guinea, London, 1889.

Attribution

- Harris, Charles Alexander (1897). "Romilly, Hugh Hastings" . In Lee, Sidney (ed.). Dictionary of National Biography. Vol. 49. London: Smith, Elder & Co. "[Letters and Memoir of Hugh Hastings Romilly, London, 1893; Mennell's Dict. of Australian Biogr.; official records; private information.]"
