= Olivier-David Benoît =

Olivier-David Benoît (6 February 1837 – 19 February 1897) was a shoemaker by trade and attained importance in history as a trade union leader.

Benoît had his early trade union experience with an American-based group called the Knights of Labor. Expanding from the United States to Canada in the late 19th century, they supported a radical set of social reforms. They were politically active and worked to educate the public with their positions

Olivier-David Benoît was a first generation labour leader who believed in the ideals espoused by the Knights and worked to give working people a societal voice. In a notable case, Benoît appeared before the Royal Commission on the Relations of Capital and Labor in Canada chaired by James Sherrard Armstrong. He made a strong case about the need to improve conditions workers in the boot and shoe industry were facing.
