= Frank Coller =

British lawyer, judge and civil servant

Frank Herbert Coller CB

Chief Justice of St Lucia
- In office 1912 – 30 June 1919
- Preceded by: Unknown
- Succeeded by: Unknown

Permanent Secretary, Ministry of Food
- In office November 1919 – March 1921

Secretary, Food Department (Board of Trade)
- In office 1921–1925

Personal details
- Born: 26 December 1866 King's Lynn, United Kingdom
- Died: 8 October 1938 (aged 71)
- Education: Westminster School
- Alma mater: Christ Church, Oxford
- Occupation: Lawyer, Judge, Civil Servant
- Awards: Companion of the Order of the Bath (CB)

Frank Herbert Coller, CB (26 December 1866 – 8 October 1938) was a British lawyer, judge and civil servant.

== Early life and career ==
Born on 26 December 1866 at King's Lynn, he was the fourth son of Richard Coller. He attended Westminster School then Christ Church, Oxford, matriculating in 1884; he studied classics, graduating in 1889 (having placed in the first class in both mods and greats). He was president of the Oxford Union in 1890. He was called to the bar at Lincoln's Inn in 1893 and practised on the South Eastern Circuit before he was appointed Chief Justice of St Lucia in 1912.

Amidst the First World War, in January 1917 he was seconded to serve in the Ministry of Food; he was appointed a Companion of the Order of the Bath in the 1919 New Year Honours for his work. Having resigned as Chief Justice on 30 June 1919, he was the Ministry of Food's Permanent Secretary from November 1919 until March 1921, when the ministry was dissolved. From 1921 to 1925, he was Secretary of the Food Department at the Board of Trade. In 1926, he published A State Trading Adventure, a history of his work in food control during the war. He died on 8 October 1938.
