= Fort Glanville Conservation Park =

Protected area in South Australia

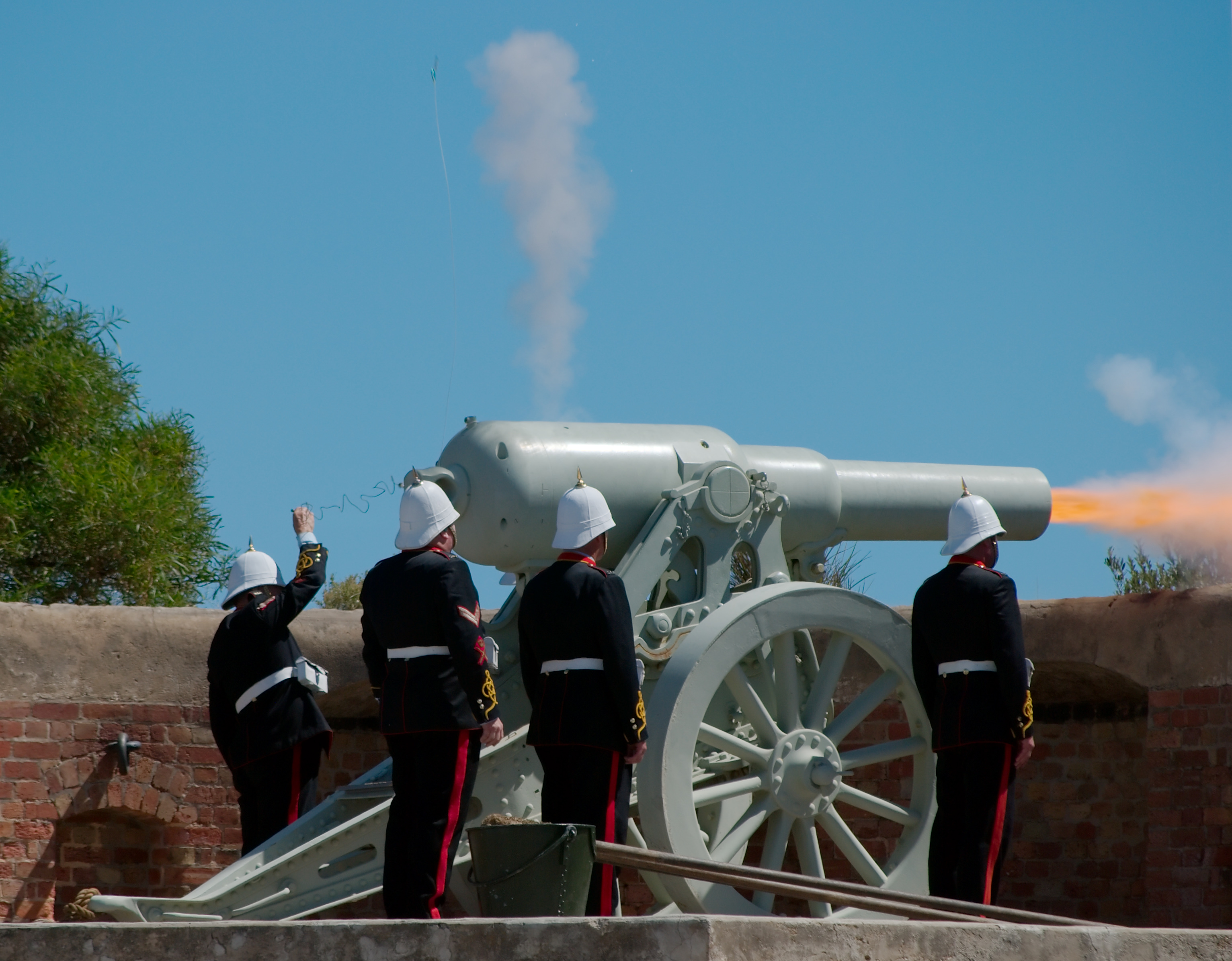
- A firing demonstration with one of the fort's RML 64 pounder 64 cwt guns

- Location within South Australia
- Location: South Australia
- Nearest city: Semaphore Park, South Australia
- Coordinates: 34°51′3.5″S 138°28′37.9″E
- Area: 5 ha (12 acres)
- Established: 1 January 1951
- Visitors: 7000 (in 1988)
- Governing body: Department for Environment and Water
- Website: Official website

Fort Glanville Conservation Park is a protected area located in the Australian state of South Australia located in Semaphore Park, a seaside suburb of Adelaide consisting of a functional 19th century fort listed on the South Australian Heritage Register and some adjoining land used as a caravan park. The fort was built after more than 40 years of indecision over the defence of South Australia. It was the first colonial fortification in the state and is considered one of the best preserved and most functional in Australia. Fort Glanville was designed by Governor Major General Sir William Jervois and Lieutenant Colonel Peter Scratchley, both important figures in early Australian colonial defence. When built it was designed to defend both Semaphore's anchorage and shipping entering the Port River from naval attack.

Construction of the fort began in 1878. It was officially opened in October 1880 and completed by 1882. Due to changes in the Port River and shipping movements, Fort Largs surpassed it for strategic importance in 1890. By the close of the 19th century, the fort was largely unused and had no defence significance. It was briefly used for military purposes during World War I and World War II, though not for its original defensive role. For much of the 20th century the area was put to a variety of uses including accommodation, a caravan park and a boy scout campsite. After coming into state government hands in 1951 it was declared as a conservation park and is now managed by the Department for Environment and Water (DEW), preserving and showcasing its historic value. The fort and surrounds occupy the northern half of the 5-hectare (12-acre) conservation park, the southern half is a caravan park. The fort is a lunette shaped defensible battery that was supported by land forces for self-defence. When constructed it was seen as state of the art, incorporating powerful and modern weapons. Its main armament is two rifled muzzle-loading (RML) 10 inch 20 ton guns, backed up by two RML 64 pounder 64 cwt guns, both rare in their particular configuration. The fort retains its original 19th century cannons, and three have been restored to working condition.

Fort Glanville Historical Association operates the park under license and conducts open days in the park, recreating the past operation of the fort including military drill and the firing of period weapons. The Association, park service, other volunteers and various grants have all helped ensure the fort is presented in close to original condition. It is the most complete 19th Century fort in Australia, and one of very few in the world that remains in original condition. Connecting the fort to Semaphore jetty is the Semaphore and Fort Glanville Tourist Railway, a 457 mm (18.0 in) gauge passenger steam train operated by volunteers from the National Railway Museum.

== Historic background ==
In the early years of colonial South Australia, the colonists saw themselves as part of the British Empire and external defence as an Imperial responsibility. Communication lines were long and the empire's wars remote. Great Britain had undisputed military predominance and she was expected by all to protect her colonies, even one as distant. For local defence, Governor Gawler raised the first military force in 1840, composed solely of volunteers and known as the South Australian Volunteer Militia Brigade. It was granted the "Royal" title in 1841 but the brigade had all but ceased to exist a year later. The colony obtained its first artillery in 1847 with the arrival of six field guns of various types.

Tensions between Britain and the Russian Empire in the 1850s, as starkly demonstrated by the Crimean War, along with Australia-wide moves towards self-government caused a reassessment of the colony's defence posture. The various colonies regarded themselves as possible targets for the Russian Pacific Fleet, then based in Siberia. In 1854, Governor Henry Young appointed a commission under Boyle Travers Finniss to report on the defence of the colony, in case of war. Boyle's report recommended leaving strategic defence in the hands of the Imperial Navy, though South Australia was to purchase a 400-ton naval vessel. Local defence was to be largely handled by the existing small Imperial garrison and local colonial force, supported by the artillery obtained in 1847.

When the Crimean War ended in 1856, the danger passed and the perceived need for expensive defence preparations with it. For many years nothing substantive came about from debate on defence of the colony. Over time there formed a consensus favouring Semaphore for fixed defences or fortification; a strategy also argued by the government established Hart Commission in 1858. Raiders were seen as unlikely to force the shallows of the Port River but instead were expected to stand off Semaphore, shell the port and use their guns to support landings. The Hart Report recommended building of martello towers at Semaphore and Glenelg, the first report to recommend permanent fortification at Semaphore, though none were built mainly due to the cost.

The volunteer military force was revived in 1859, with new and modern arms for the infantry, cavalry and artillery. Though there was a few years of enthusiasm and a restructuring in 1866, by 1870 the force was virtually disbanded. In that year also, British troops were withdrawn from the other Australian colonies; none were by then stationed in South Australia. With no definitive defence policy, in 1864 the government had sought advice from Captain Parkin of HMS Falcon and Commodore Sir William Wiseman commander of the Australian station; both visiting British naval officers. They both recommended fixed fortifications for the coast supported by gunboats. Sir Wiseman's report particularly recommended construction of forts at Semaphore, Port Creek's entrance and one midway between.

In 1864, a story circulated, supported by press speculation, that there was a danger of the Russian fleet attacking Melbourne should Russia and Britain find themselves at war. The South Australian Register produced an editorial decrying the states lack of defences. Within days £20,000 (A$4.14 million in 2005) (Note: Currency converted using relative rate of 85.08989 between January 1864 and 2005 for the Pound sterling from: "Inflation: the value of the pound 1750–2005" (PDF). House of Commons Library. 2005. Archived from the original (PDF) on 26 March 2009. Converted to Australian Dollars at $1=£0.4112 from Australian Reserve Bank published spot rate for January 2005) was provided by the government for defence, an amount then seen as insufficient for significant preparation. The danger passed without any lasting defence action except the government's in-principle adoption of Sir Wiseman's recommendations. To curtail costs only the Semaphore fort was to be built initially, as it was considered the most critical. Site preparation begun and two 9-inch (230 mm) guns were purchased, but escalating cost estimates caused the plan to be abandoned by 1868.

During the early 1870s South Australia's defence was solely dependent on the volunteer military, and a few artillery pieces purchased during earlier war scares. British troops had been withdrawn from the Australian colonies in 1870, leaving the state dependent on its own military resources. In a report to the government in 1866, Colonel Freeling and Major Peter Scratchley recommended establishment of a permanent military force. In 1876 the South Australian government, along with those from New South Wales, Victoria and Queensland requested from the War Office that Major General Sir William Jervois, a noted coastal fortification expert, be appointed to advise on defence needs. He arrived in Sydney in mid-1877 with then Lieutenant Colonel Scratchley.

The 1877 report, delivered after he became South Australian Governor, called for three batteries, at Largs Bay, Semaphore and Glenelg, connected by a military road and supported by field gun emplacements, naval elements and mobile forces. He determined that South Australia's most probable defence risk was an attack by up to two ships rather than a larger force, and this formed the basis of the final fortification design. His report called for Military Road to be extended to Marino, an electro-contact torpedo station be established on Torrens Island and that a gun boat be provided. In November 1878 the government passed the Military Forces Act, which provided for the raising of a permanent military force and reserve. Two volunteer reserve rifle companies were formed in 1878 and a permanent artillery unit in 1882.

At this time Semaphore, with its jetty built in 1860, was the state's main entry point for passengers and mail. It had a signal station (built 1872) and a time ball tower (built 1875). Semaphore remained of great maritime significance for the state until the 1880s. When the decision was made to build the fort, in 1878, the state's population had reached approximately 250,000. Settlement extended beyond Port Augusta, though Adelaide remained the dominant feature in the economy partly due to the layout of the rail network. At this point Adelaide had a population of over 30,000. Port Adelaide was the main port for South Australia, with over 1,000 ships visiting each year, and a local population of over 2,500.

== Foundation ==
Scratchley had inspected the proposed South Australian fort sites, and Jervois and Scratchley were both responsible for the final fort design and location. The first fort was erected to guard both the entrance to Port Adelaide and the anchorage at Semaphore. It was built on sandhills near Glanville Hall at Semaphore, on a promontory called "Point Malcom"—a name that is now used for an adjacent reserve. The site was chosen so as to best guard shipping sailing to both the Port River and the Outer Harbour; and a second northern fort was to protect the entrance to Port River itself. At the time of its construction it was seen as a defence against foreign threats, mainly Russian.

Scratchley offered to design the battery. The offer was accepted by Cabinet in January 1878, and he was primarily responsible for the design of both Fort Glanville and Fort Largs. The plans were drawn by Alexander Bain Moncrieff of the South Australian Engineer-in-Chief's Department, supervised by Scratchley in his Melbourne headquarters. Moncrieff, at Scratchley's suggestion, was later to supervise the fort's construction. Plans for both batteries were completed in June 1878, tenders called for in July and the contract for Fort Glanville awarded in August to John Robb of Kapunda, South Australia for the sum of £15,893 12s 7d.

Construction began in 1878 and though completed by 1882 the fort was operational in 1880. Changes were made to the design during construction. Some forced by armament changes and others made to ensure additional security, including a rear-defence wall and connecting road from Military Road. By January 1880 two guns were in place and the fort opened later the same year with an extensive opening ceremony on 2 October. In addition to parades, a small target was moored 3,500 yards (3,200 m) offshore and fired on by all guns. A total of sixteen shots was fired during which one of the ten inch guns proved faulty. Only one ranging shot was fired and the shots were estimated to land from on-target to 350 yards short. The fort's final cost was approximately £36,000 (A$7.05 (Note: Currency converted using relative rate of 80.56383 between January 1882 and 2005 for the Pound sterling from: "Inflation: the value of the pound 1750–2005" (PDF). House of Commons Library. 2005. Archived from the original (PDF) on 26 March 2009. Converted to Australian Dollars at $1=£0.4112 from Australian Reserve Bank published spot rate for January 2005) million in 2005) consisting of £23,600 for physical structures and the remainder for armament and fittings. At the time of its construction it was at the forefront of such fortification design, and was considered state of the art.

When first conceived, it was known as the Semaphore Battery, later changed to South Battery and then Fort Glanville by the opening ceremony. The name Glanville came from nearby Glanville Hall, residence of John Hart (1809–1873) thrice Premier of South Australia. Hart had named the house after his mother's maiden name (Mary Glanville).

== Personnel ==
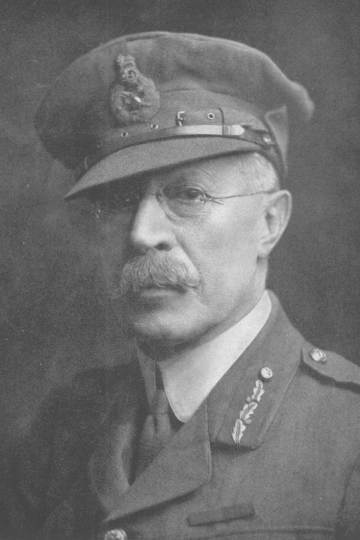
Joseph Maria Gordon was the fort's first commander. Pictured in 1921

For the eighteen months after its opening, the fort was manned by B company of the South Australian Volunteer Artillery but only on weekends. This changed in mid-1882 when South Australia's first permanent military force was formed. The fort became the headquarters for the South Australian Permanent Military Force, then the state's entire standing army of one officer and eighteen other ranks. Some of the unit was stationed at nearby Fort Largs from 1886; and, by 1889 the unit had grown to one officer and 45 other ranks. This force grew to 53 of all ranks by 1892 and was by then known as the Permanent Artillery. The unit trained 27 more non-commissioned officers and men who were sent to man the King George Sound batteries near Albany, Western Australia. Though some of the gunners served in the Second Boer War, the unit itself never saw action. Fort Glanville's section was called out in 1890, marching to assist the police with a waterside worker's strike in Port Adelaide. In this case no shots were fired and the strikers did not confront the police or troops. Additional defence acts were passed in 1886, 1890 and 1895 but, until defence passed into federal hands after 1901, the state's permanent military force was composed solely of artillery. Shortly after the federation of Australia, a regiment of the Royal Australian Artillery (RAA) was formed and what had been the Permanent Artillery became No.10 company RAA. The fort was manned to an extent during World War I, with one non-commissioned officer and 11 gunners stationed as of November 1914. Military reports and orders show the fort manned to at least mid-1918, though at this point it is doubtful if the guns were fit to engage targets.

There is little in the way of surviving personnel records from the fort's active time. They may have either been destroyed or transferred to Melbourne after federation. The fort's record book shows it manned by a section of either the Royal Australian Artillery or B Company of the militia garrison artillery. For the time covered by the book, strength varied from 56 to 108 men of all ranks. Two figures who served at the fort are remembered for their impact outside its operation:

- Battery Sergeant Major Charles Moritz, who initially joined the volunteer artillery and was the Permanent Artillery's first recruit.
- Joseph Maria Gordon (1856–1929), the fort's first commander and later military commandant for South Australia. Gordon retired in 1914 as Chief of the General Staff, Australian Military Forces.

== Structure ==
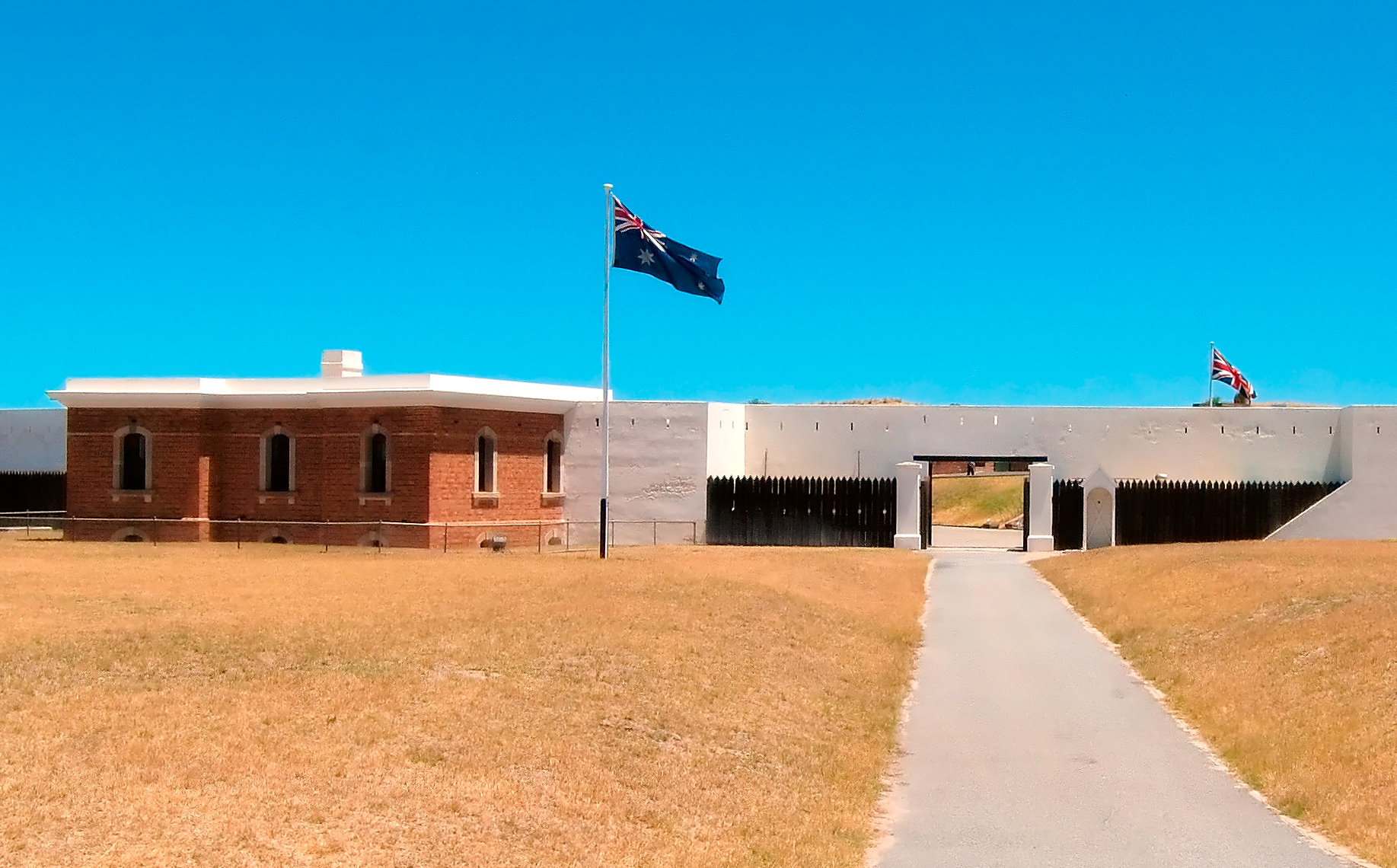
The entrance to Fort Glanville, via the Queen Elizabeth II walk

The fort is designed as a defensible battery, rather than a defensive strongpoint. The faces of the fort join to form a half-moon shape or lunette. The guns' primary role was to defend Port Adelaide and the Semaphore anchorage rather than the fort itself, and the design reflects this. It was intended to be supported by field artillery, cavalry and infantry for self-defence and to repel landings. While the fort retains its original form, the ditch and glacis (embankment) have been modified and are largely non-existent in some areas. Ground levels have been changed to accommodate paths and a caravan park, and the original western fence no longer exists.

The entrance road was constructed from Military Road to the fort's rear gates. Its path is largely followed by the modern Queen Elizabeth II walk, though the former road was slightly to the south. This walk links the conservation park's visitor centre to the fort gates; some of the old road can still be seen close to the gates. What was the muster ground is partly taken up by the caravan and camping park and a car park. It was levelled and filled in the 1950s for this use. What remains of this ground, north of the caravan park, was returned to its 1880s profile in 1993 funded by a federal government grant. In the 19th century, the muster ground was used for training of the Volunteer Military Force including artillery, who camped on the site. As designed the fort's rear was protected with a wooden palisade or stockade. In 1881 a masonry wall was added, greatly strengthening defence. Most of the stockade was reconstructed in the 1970s; some of the original wooden structure is visible in the fort's north.

=== Fortification ===
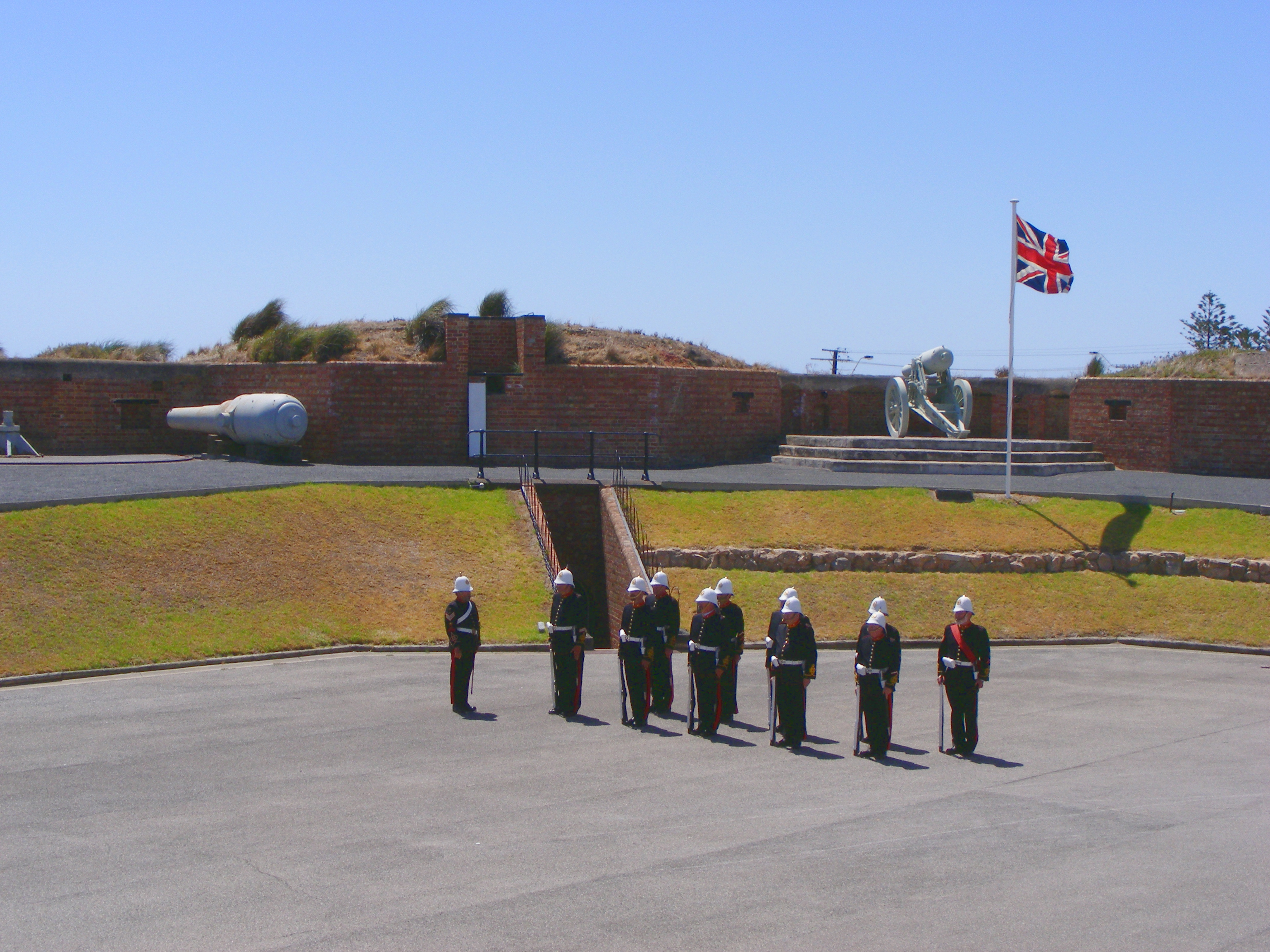
Manning Parade, terreplein, gun emplacements and the rear of the rampart

The main defensive structure is a revetted lunette shaped earthwork. It has a 15-metre (49 ft) thick rampart with 1.5 m (5 ft) of concrete and 0.6 m (2 ft) of brick forming a retaining wall for the earth fill. The rampart is covered by natural vegetation and, in both the 19th and 21st century operation, is closed to access to preserve this. The glacis gives extra protection to the fort and was designed to blend the fort into the landscape. It surrounded the fort on the north, south and seaward sides and was made by forming the surrounding sandhills. The side facing the fort—the scarp—is steep and, with the front face of the rampart, forms a 12 ft (3.7 m) wide ditch that can be raked by rifle fire from the caponier or the stockade's sides. The outer face is a gentle slope and is designed to be covered by case shot fired from the fort's 64-pounder guns. The southern glacis section was removed during sand mining and construction of the caravan park, both after World War II. The western glacis is changed, but still visible, and the northern glacis was recreated in 1993—showcasing the purpose of the glacis and the function of the caponier.

Access to the fort is via double gates at the fort's rear, one each through the stockade and the rear defence wall. Both gates were removed or destroyed over time and the 21st century gates are reconstructions. The formal parade ground or manning parade lies between the rear walls and barracks, and the raised terreplein. It was formerly used for drill training, assembly and formal parades. First gravelled when constructed, it was paved with tar in the 1890s to solve drainage problems. Around the seaward side of the manning parade runs the terreplein. It is a raised crescent shaped level on which the guns platforms sit, and is ascended from the manning parade by ramps and stairs.

After numerous proposals the sand hills rear and north of the fort were removed in 1882, improving the fort's land defence and allowing the 64-pounder guns to sweep the Semaphore jetty. This now levelled area was used as a bivouac and exercise area for the colony's volunteer troops. A stable, office, shed and gunner's store were also erected north of the fort. The gunner's shed was damaged by fire in 1895 and replaced further eastward. These buildings did not survive into the 21st century.

=== Internal rooms ===
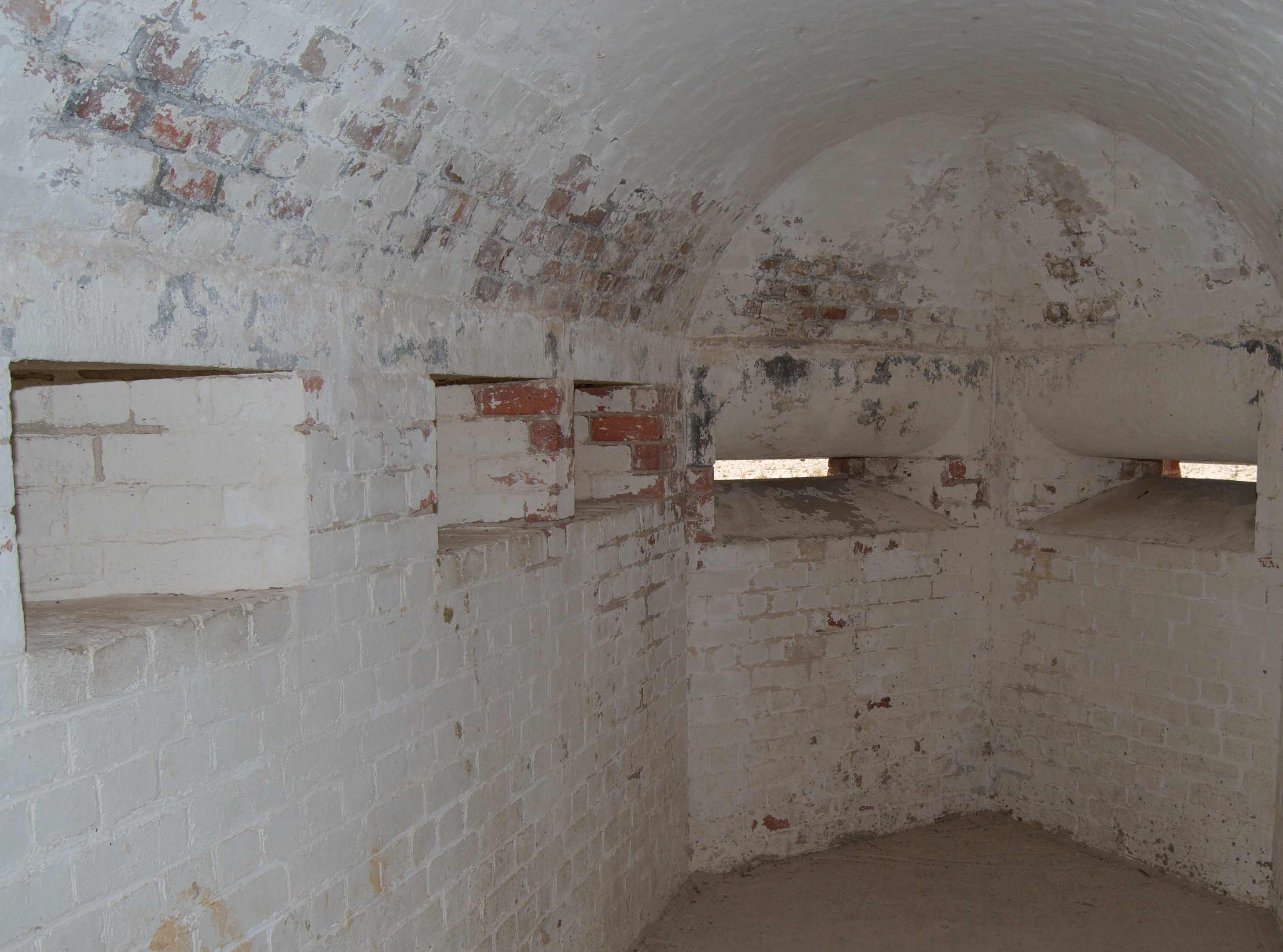
The internal structure of the caponier

On either side of the terreplein, wide of the 64-pound guns, are two small rooms known as the expense stores. They were used for ready-to-use ammunition for the adjacent guns, except for armour piercing shells which were stored in the rear-defence wall's archways. Between the 64-pounders and the 10" gun positions are two raised observation platforms set into the structure for gun commanders to spot the fall of outgoing shells. Ranging was either performed from here or from a ranging position set in the sand hills to the fort's north. Between the 10" guns is a T-shaped loading gallery that draws shells and gunpowder via a hoist system from the magazine below. Either side of the gallery was installed the Armstrong mechanical loading systems for the 10" guns. These mechanical systems proved unsuccessful and were removed in the 1890s, though the southern one has been reconstructed. The magazine is accessed from the manning parade and is directly beneath the 10" gun loading gallery. Voice pipes and hoists originally installed have been removed but their remains are visible.

The caponier (rifle gallery) extends into the ditch between the rampart and glacis from the fort's north west corner. It is connected to the fort via a tunnel, running under the rampart from the manning parade. For blast protection and defensibility the tunnel was built with a dogleg. The caponier has rifle firing ports and was originally protected from direct artillery fire by the glacis. Early plans showed the caponier extending from the fort's south west, and a tunnel linking the magazine and southern guns.

=== Buildings ===
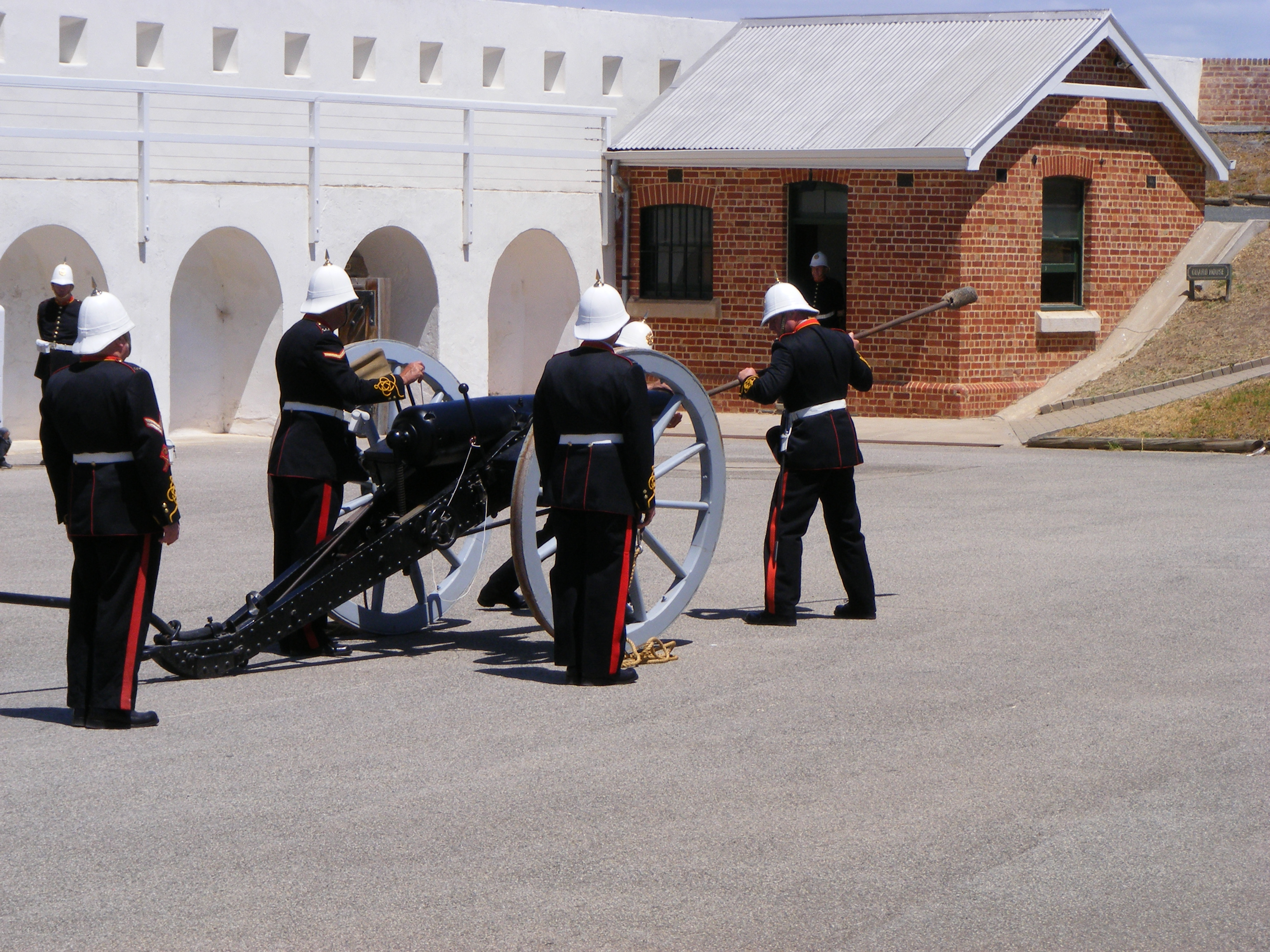
16 pounder being loaded in front of the guardhouse and rear defensive wall. Note the archways formerly used to store 64-pounder ammunition

The barracks consists of two levels, with rifle firing holes on all sides. Iron shutters closed on the inside and were locked with wooden beams. In 1885 the verandah facing the manning parade was enclosed with wooden shutters to keep the weather out. These shutters were removed during 20th-century restoration work and the verandah returned to original condition. The roof was at first flat timber overlaid by 12 inches (30 cm) of lime concrete. This first roof leaked and an iron roof was added in 1885. The first floor of the barracks contains the officer's rooms and troop's barracks room. Its eastern (outer) wall is not flat, incorporating a design feature known as "hornwork", which opens the field of fire from the rifle holes. Some of the firing holes were bricked in during the 1930s; this has been only partly rectified during restoration.

The basement contains the gunner's mess, canteen, No. 1 ancillary store, pantry and officer's kitchen. The canteen sold everyday necessities as well as a few items like biscuits, sweets and tobacco to the stationed troops. Profits from the canteen were used to fund sporting equipment for the garrison. The No.1 ancillary store was used for various pieces of delicate equipment, fuses, friction tubes and rockets. In 1887 an explosion in the room caused a number of injuries, damage to the store and to the above officer's quarters. The barracks room and officer's quarters are connected with a door, probably added in the 1930s as it is not part of the original plans. The barracks room accommodated approximately 20 men. For display purposes it is outfitted as for similar period barracks.

A laboratory is built into the rear wall, on the forts southern side. This room is set into the end of the rampart and was used to prepare gunpowder charges. A guardhouse was built at the manning parade's southern end in 1885. It is now used as a duty room for the drill squad during recreation demonstrations but originally was a guard's room and separate cells connected by telephone to Fort Largs. Up to three men appear to have been accommodated in the guard's room. When the fort was converted to use as a caravan park the guard house was converted to an ablution block. A store and ablution block were also built in 1885 between the stockade and rear defence wall.

== Armament ==
Early plans for the fort's armament were drawn up by Harding Stewart of the British War Office. They called for four 9 in (230 mm) 12 long tons (12 t) rifled muzzle-loading (RML) guns, two mounted in turrets and two behind vertical iron shields. This configuration of siege artillery had not been tried before and the plan was abandoned due to the large expected cost. Two of the 9 in guns had been in South Australia since c.1868 after a Colonial Government request, but were not used in the eventual fort design. The final Jervois/Scratchley design omitted the turret and iron shields. 64-pounder RML guns were substituted for two of the 9 in guns and 10 in 20 ton RML guns for the remaining two. The 20 ton guns were chosen over the then standard 18 ton gun by Jervois after he saw the plans in England, the decision influenced by the then fully committed nature of the Royal Arsenal. Jervois had originally ordered the 18 ton guns but cancelled the order and changed to the Armstrong 20 ton when the arsenal was unable fulfil the order. He also ordered Armstrong's mechanical loading and protected barbette system for the 20 ton guns. This original battery of four heavy guns remains in place at the fort.

=== 10 inch RML guns ===
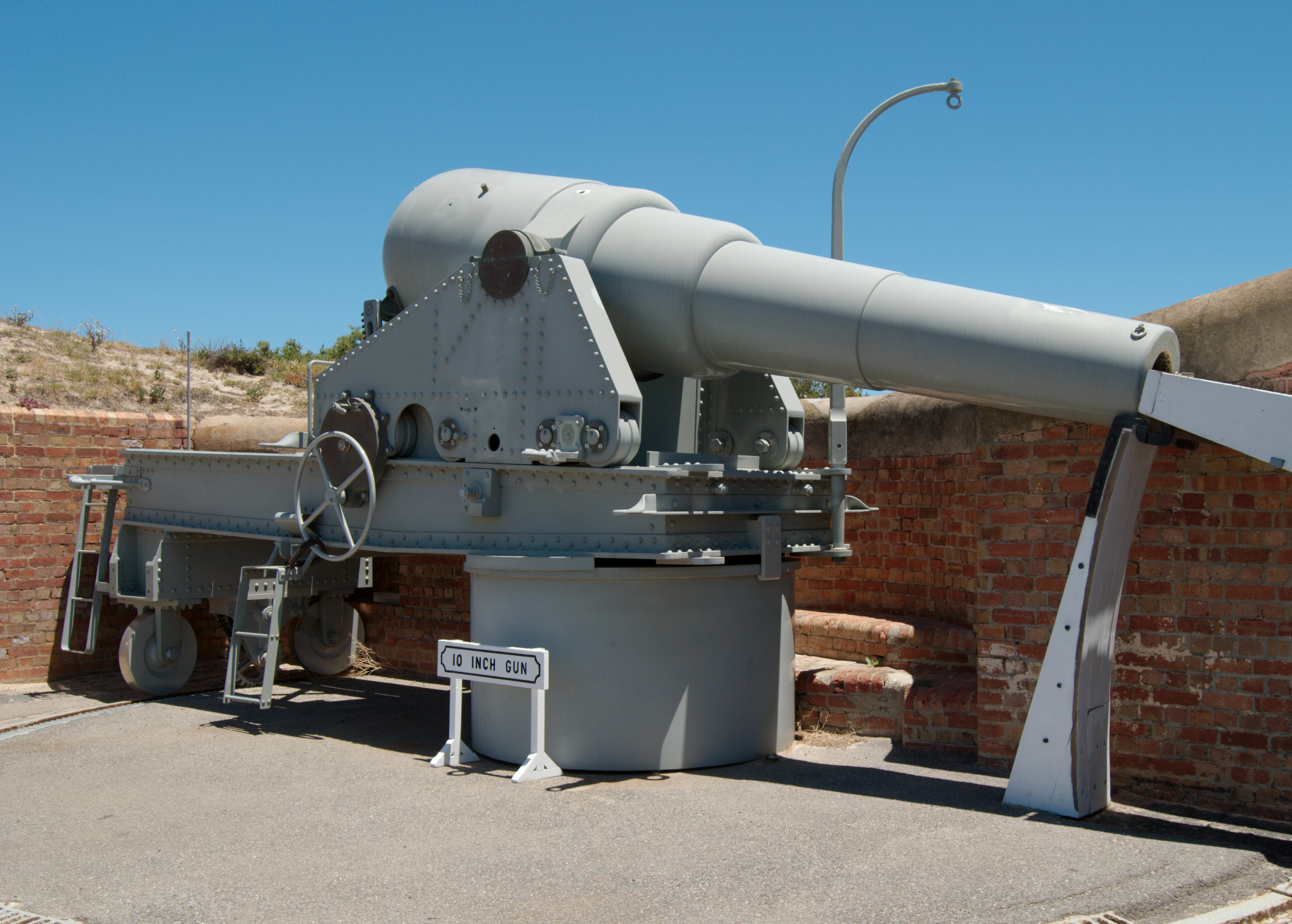
10 inch 20 ton RML gun on a reconstructed carriage. Barbette protected loading system to the right

The fort's main armament were the two RML 10 inch 20 ton guns—Numbers 3470 and 3472. They were manufactured in 1879 by WG Armstrong and Company and originally used the Armstrong protected barbette loading system. They were made to the 1878 pattern and supplied on traversing slides. The guns have a 10-inch (250 mm) calibre, a range of 6,500 yards (5,900 m) with a muzzle velocity of 1,630 feet per second (497 m/s) and are capable of penetrating 11 inches (28 cm) of iron at 2,000 yards (1,800 m).

They fire 400-pound (181 kg) projectiles using a 130-pound (59 kg) gunpowder cartridge. Though they were insufficient against contemporary battleships, they were seen as adequate for the light cruisers that the fort was expected to face. The carriages weighed 13 long tons (13 t) and moved on semi-circular traverses. The guns were loaded either manually—using the Woolwich (derrick) system—or via the Armstrong mechanical loader. The Armstrong system enabled loading of the guns from behind the protection of the rampart whereas the manual system required at least two crew to be exposed on the rampart's top. Despite this the guns were manually loaded for most of their operational life as the Armstrong cable drive was faulty and too difficult to maintain. The guns had a 14-man crew and loading took about 2 minutes, a rate of fire that was only slightly faster using the Armstrong equipment.

By 1902 the guns had together fired 219 rounds, though not all at full charge with the records showing only 125 effective full charges. The platforms and traverses were scrapped in 1937 but the gun barrels were uneconomic to cut up and were left in place. One gun platform and its equipment was rebuilt in 1997 using money raised by Fort Glanville Historical Association volunteers working at the Australian Grand Prix.

=== 64 pounder RML guns ===
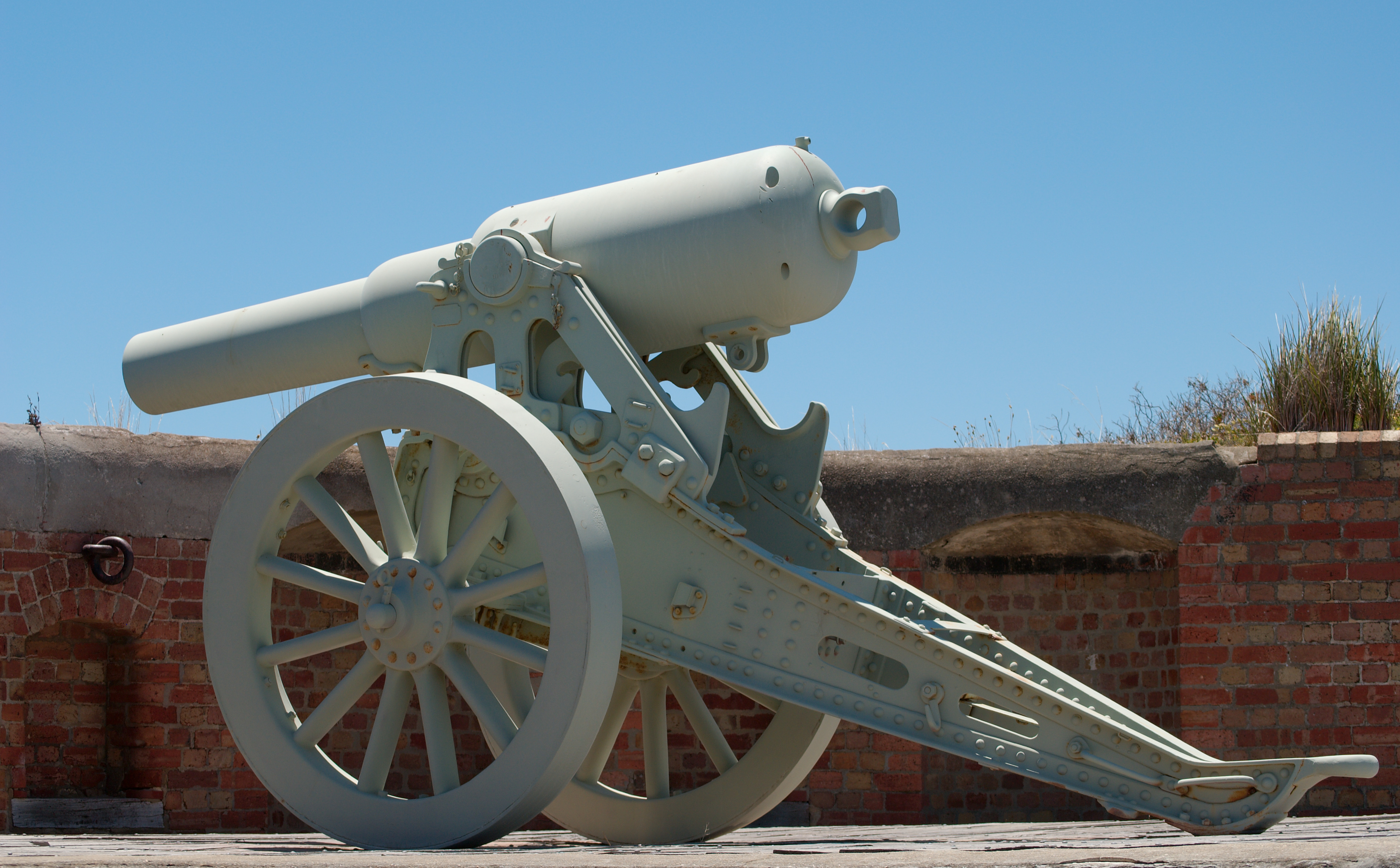
64-pounder gun on its firing platform

In the flank barbettes are mounted two mark III RML 64 pounder 64 cwt guns, numbers 462 and 463. They are rifled muzzle-loading heavy guns weighing 64 long hundredweight (3,300 kg) with a 6.3-inch (160 mm) calibre steel barrel. They were made to the model's 1867 pattern by the Royal Arsenal, Woolwich, England in 1872. Their intended use was to protect the flanks and approaches to the fort. These smaller guns use an 8 lb (4 kg) charge of gunpowder to send a 64 lb (29 kg) projectile up to 5,000 yards (4,600 m). There are iron rings fixed in the rampart wall that indicate traversing gun carriages were intended to be mounted, though this never eventuated. The guns were supplied with siege over-bank carriages. The lower carriage sections are the type made for the guns when used as field pieces and the upper sections are brackets that raise the guns to the over-bank firing position. In this particular configuration the two guns are thought to be the last in the world.

By the end of their active use in 1902 together they had fired 1540 rounds in practice, though not all at full power as they are recorded as firing under 300 effective full charges. By then the wheels were significantly rotted and the ammunition limbers had become unserviceable. Less wheels, the guns were removed from the fort in 1909; Adelaide's city council then set them in Brougham Gardens, North Adelaide. Both were returned to the fort in 1976 and remounted on restored carriages of the original design. They are the only two guns of their type remaining in Australia. The southern gun (Number 463) fired three blank charges in 1980 to mark the centenary of the first firing at the fort. This same gun is fired regularly by the volunteers of the Fort Glanville Historical Association (FGHA).

Both types of heavy guns used where the only ones of their specific series and type to come to Australia. Though they were never fired in anger, the battery is only 40 feet (12 m) above mean sea level which would have limited the accuracy of the mark III depression rangefinders used.

=== Other weaponry ===
Prior to 1895 two 6-inch (200 mm) breech-loading guns had been imported for use in small boats. This use was rejected by military authorities and the guns sat unused. In 1895 the South Australian Defence Committee proposed that the guns be mounted at Fort Glanville, replacing the 64-pounders whose siege carriages were then unfit for service. This proposal would have greatly extended the useful life of the fort, at little cost. The two military branches, army and navy, could not reach agreement and the proposal was abandoned by 1897. The gun's eventual fate is unknown, though a gun found in the Port River later indicates they may have been dumped.

Gun emplacements were made, about a mile apart south of the fort, for six 16-pounder field guns to provide close defence in case of an attempted beach landing. From 1890 the fort was equipped with moveable armament. It received an 1867 Whitworth 12-pounder RML field gun and a 5-barrel 0.45" Martini-henry cartridge firing Nordenfelt gun. The 12-pounder had fired 222 effective full charges by 1902; at which time both weapons were obsolete and their eventual fate is unknown. A 32-pounder 56 long cwt (2,800 kg) smoothbore gun on a stepped wooden carriage was purchased in 1878. Manufactured by the Royal Arsenal in 1806, it was the familiar "ships cannon" and came to South Australia with two other identical guns. By 1902 no ammunition was held for it and it was listed as for instruction only. The gun was probably destroyed in the 1930s—certainly by the end of the 1940s— with pieces of such a gun found on site in 1983.

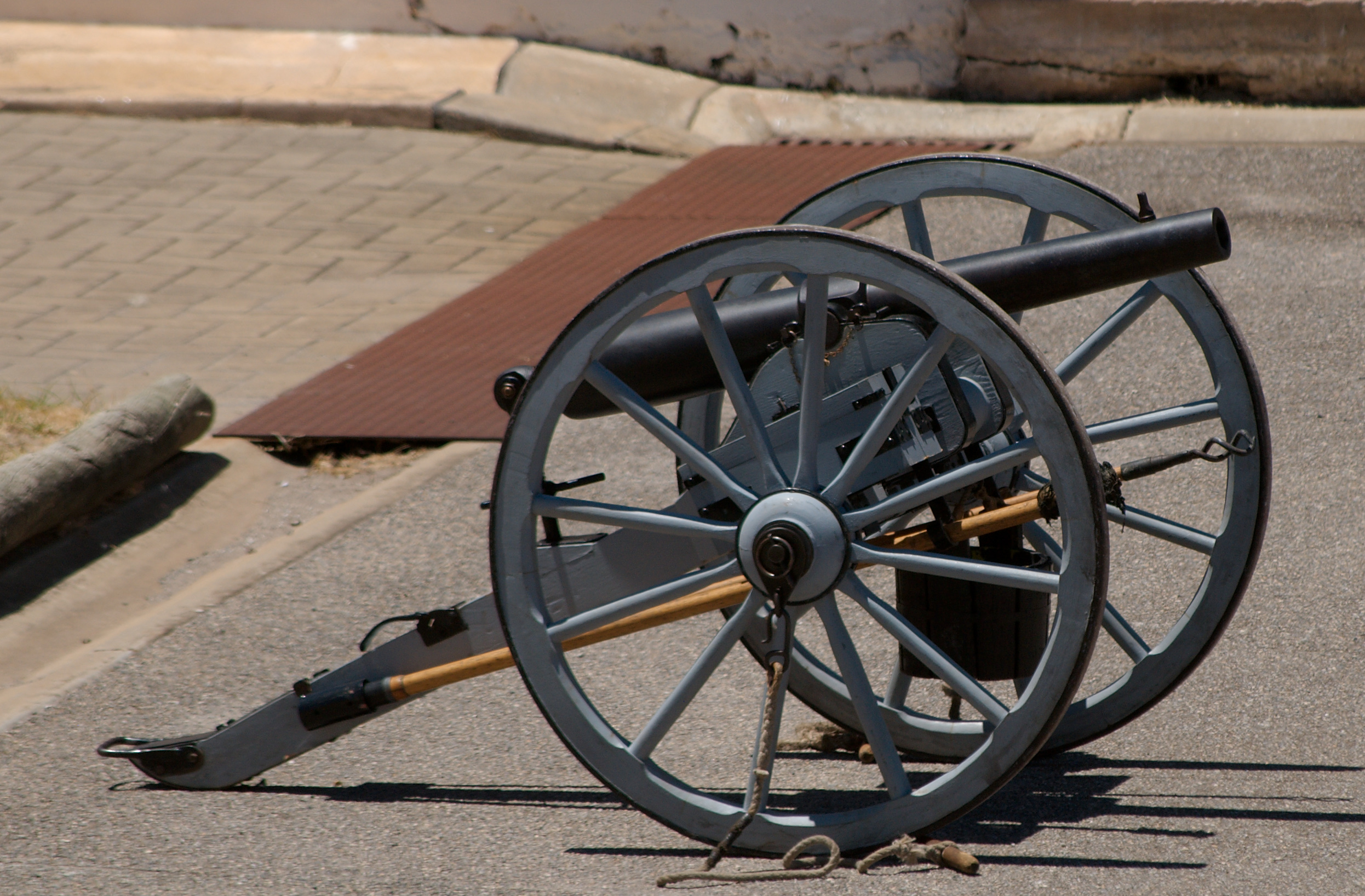
2-pounder RML Whitworth mountain gun

In the late 20th century the fort acquired three 16-pounder RML mark I field guns. They were formerly used by A battery, South Australian Volunteer Artillery from 1880 until 1901. Gun number 288 is complete and used for blank firings by the Historical Association. Also acquired is a 2-pounder RML Whitworth mountain gun made in 1867. It was also used by A Battery, subsequently by Fort Largs as a signal gun. It is one of only two of this type known to exist, the other in the United Kingdom. The visitors centre has two 9-pounder brass smoothbore field guns made by H&C King in 1819. They arrived in South Australia in 1857 and were used for practice shoots near the fort c.1860; one is known to have been on the manning parade in 1890 though its use is unknown. They later became saluting guns at Fort Largs, moving by 1919 to near the Jervois Wing of the State Library of South Australia. The Art Gallery of South Australia saved them from a 1941 wartime scrap drive and mounted them on reproduction naval carriages in front of Government House in 1962. The gallery took them back in late 1977 and transferred them to the History Trust of South Australia in 1988. The History Trust has loaned them to Fort Glanville for display. Outside the visitor's centre is a 6 in (200 mm) breech-loading Armstrong 80 long cwt (4,100 kg) gun (No.4242) that was made in 1884 and used in Victoria. The Commonwealth Scientific and Industrial Research Organisation (CSIRO) brought it to the state in 1966 for research, subsequently moving it to Perry Engineering at Mile End. In 1984 the CSIRO donated the gun to the park.

== Defence significance ==
Work began in 1882 on Fort Glanville's northern sister Fort Largs—then known as the Port Adelaide battery—to the same specification as Fort Glanville; its barracks and rear defence wall were finished in 1885. Though guns had already been purchased specially, plans for the third fort at Glenelg were not proceeded with. South Australia was experiencing a depression in 1886 and that coupled with a report by General James Bevan Edwards scuttled plans for the third coastal fort. As early as 1888 the emphasis for defence of the Adelaide coast had already shifted to Fort Largs; a fact cited as part of the reason for abandonment of the Glenelg fortifications.

From this point Fort Glanville's significance declined rapidly. Fort Largs was equipped in 1889 with two 6 inch breech-loading disappearing guns which outranged Glanville's armament. The decline was also linked to changes in Port Adelaide's maritime facilities and the consequent northward movement of anchored and berthed vessels. During the 1880s the Port River was deepened enabling large ships to sail up and berth, rather than the former practice of anchoring off-shore.

The fort remained as headquarters of South Australia's permanent military force until the 1890s and as late as 1895 there were still plans to upgrade the 64-pounder armament, though without result. By 1901 the fort was manned on a caretaker basis only and no permanent forces were stationed. The Federal Government assumed responsibility for South Australian defence in 1903 and took over the fort. Though Glanville by then had no significant defence role, the state received £14,739 in compensation. From that point its significance was not defence related but as the first and best preserved 19th-century fortification in South Australia.

== 20th century ==
At Federation in 1901 South Australia's defences became a federal responsibility. Though both infantry and artillery units were housed at the site on occasion, (Note: Army troops were garrisoned at Fort Glanville during 1902, and garrison artillery in 1903.) by 1903 there was no longer a permanent military presence at the fort. For most of the 20th century the site was neglected and largely vacated. It did attract some usage though not always of a military nature. During World War I it was partly revived for a former use, with ammunition stored on site. During the same period however the military used it as a detention barracks. (Note: The fort was used for detention of conscripted military cadets for at least the period June 1913—May 1918.) Some or all of the fort was leased for private accommodation during the Great Depression. During the 1930s the magazine was again used, this time to store small arms ammunition. From June 1931 until the beginning of World War II the site housed a Sea Scout detachment, and was used as a district camp-site for the Boy Scouts.

The Department of Defence decided in 1937 that much of the equipment and fittings at the fort were surplus to requirements. Consequent to this the mountings and carriages for the 10 inch guns were removed and sold as scrap; though effort was made to scrap the barrels it proved uneconomic and they were left in place. In an unusual turn of events, the fort briefly housed refugees. Twenty-nine islanders from the Maldives were rescued from their sinking dhow by a ship bound for Wallaroo. They stayed at the fort for a week in 1938, before repatriation could be arranged. During World War II the fort again attracted military related use. During 1944 the Proof and Experimental Establishment at Port Wakefield made use of the site to proof ordnance QF 6 pounder anti-tank guns manufactured at General Motors Holden in Woodville. The fort was also used as a residence again, with at least two families reported as living in the under-ground sections during the war.

After the war, the State Government negotiated with its federal counterpart to gain control of Fort Glanville. This eventuated in the 1951 sale of the 13-acre (5 ha) site, which was subsequently administered by the State Tourist Department as a caravan and camping park. The park occupied the muster ground outside the fort and the fort's barracks building was used as a manager's residence. The caravan park has had various managers since establishment: Until 1981 it was managed by the National Parks and Wildlife Service (NPWS), by Woodville Council until 1986 and subsequently by a private operator under a long-term lease.

A significant change in the fort's conservation and preservation outlook was its declaration as a Historic Relic under the Aboriginal and Historic Relics Preservation Act 1965 on 25 May 1972. Up to then there had been growing awareness of the significance of the site in terms of the state's colonial heritage. Control of the park was moved to the National Parks and Wildlife Service (NPWS), and the fort and surrounds became designated as Fort Glanville Conservation Park. The National Estate Grants Program provided funds in 1975 for conservation work; NPWS began this work in the same year and the caravan park boundary was moved southwards. Though the site had long been neglected, there was minimal permanent damage to its structure.

During the 1970s reconstruction, much of the stockade was replaced. The replaced timbers are visibly different as they have shrunk significantly with large gaps that are not evident in the original timber. Adelaide City Council agreed to return the 64-pounder guns and new wheels were made; replacing those rotted over half a century before. In a ceremony on 2 October 1980, the 100th anniversary of the guns first firing, one of the 64-pounders was fired again; later a commemoration plaque was added to the fort's flagpole's base. Shortly after this firing the Fort Glanville Historical Association was formed, and was incorporated in 1981. Fort Glanville was opened for public visitation in 1981.

As part of South Australia's sesquicentenary, the South Australia Jubilee 150 board granted $250,000 for work on the fort, allowing construction of a visitor centre. Queen Elizabeth II visited and inspected the site, and newly constructed visitor centre, for almost an hour on 13 March 1986. For the visit the historical association demonstrated firing of both the 64 and 2 pounder cannons. The visitor centre was officially opened one month after this visit. Governor Dame Roma Mitchell named the old road "Queen Elizabeth II Walk" in a March 1991 ceremony, commemorating the 5th anniversary of the queen's visit. Considerable subsequent restoration work has been completed on the fort, including the barrack's interior. The portion of the muster ground that is not within the caravan park was returned to its original level in 1993.

== Park and fort today ==
Fort Glanville Conservation Park is one of South Australia's most important heritage sites. It is the premier site in the state, and possibly Australia, for showcasing colonial era defences and fortifications. The fort is listed on both the South Australian Heritage Register, the former Register of the National Estate and the National Trust's classified list. It is considered significant, in national historical military terms, for its association with Jervois and Scratchley, both leading British defence experts who influenced Australian defence thinking in the late 19th century.

The fort's durable construction and material have contributed to its preservation. The fort is largely intact and in original condition and is, along with Bluff Battery in Hobart, the best preserved Jervois-Scratchley designed fort in Australia. It is the only Australian colonial fort to still have all of its original armament, and the only to have a regular living history program. Its companion Fort Largs survives, but in greatly modified condition, converted for use as the South Australia Police academy. The fort retains its original armament, armament that is both rare in Australia and worldwide.

The conservation park is in the suburb of Semaphore Park at the southern end of the Lefevre Peninsula. It covers approximately 5 hectares (12 acres) and is bounded by Bower and Military roads, the Point Malcolm Reserve and Semaphore beach. The land is entirely crown land and is administered by the DEW. It is divided into roughly two-halves with the northern containing the fort and the southern half containing a caravan park. While it is managed by the DEW, the Fort Glanville Consultative Committee and Fort Glanville Historical Association are heavily involved. The committee is appointed by the Minister for Environment and Planning and acts to advise the Minister and liaise with the community. As of 1988, the fort hosted approximately 7,000 visitors annually, and is used as an event venue including the annual City of Charles Sturt citizenship ceremony.

The historical association is an incorporated body of volunteers who use the fort under licence from the Minister. The association operate the fort and visitor centre, holding monthly public open days at which the history of the fort is recreated; this includes drill demonstrations and firing of the fort's weapons. The association maintain static displays of the fort's active period and sell souvenirs. The association's goal is to have the site open as a fully operational fort for interpretation, tourism and education. The volunteers are involved with recreation, living history and ceremonial work outside the fort. They act as guards of honour at some Government House functions and attended the restoration opening of the Albany, Western Australia fort, and the annual re-enactment of the Battle of Waterloo in Kyneton, Victoria. The fort has living history displays, including the barracks laid out and furnished in period detail. The visitor centre has displays showing the development of South Australia's colonial defence from 1836 and artifacts found on site during restorations.

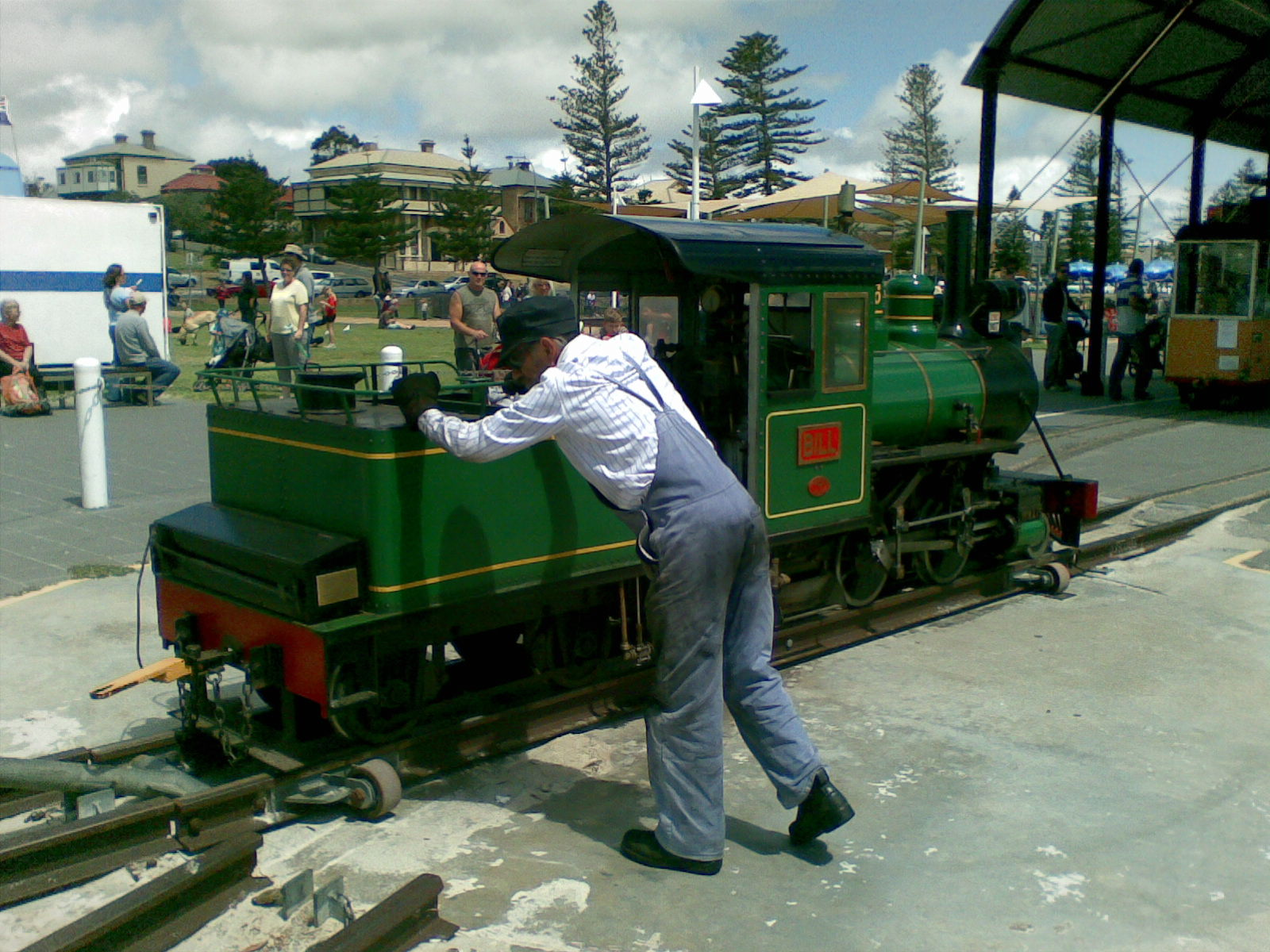
Turntable of Semaphore and Fort Glanville Tourist Railway

Connecting the fort to Semaphore jetty is the Semaphore and Fort Glanville Tourist Railway, a 457 mm (18.0 in) gauge steam train operated by volunteers from the National Railway Museum. The railway opened in December 1992 and, as of 2002, carried over 16,000 passengers annually.

== See also ==
- List of protected areas in Adelaide
- District Council of Glanville

== Bibliography ==
- Brook, Lt Colonel David N (1986). "Field Artillery 1840–1900". In Brook, David (ed.). Roundshot to Rapier (Artillery in South Australia 1840–1984). Adelaide: Royal Artillery Association of South Australia. ISBN 0-85864-098-8.
- Fort Glanville historical association (FGHA) (2000). A Guide to Fort Glanville, South Australia. Semaphore Park, South Australia: The Fort Glanville historical association.
- Hastings, Major Brian (1986). "Coast Artillery 1854–1962". In Brook, David (ed.). Roundshot to Rapier (Artillery in South Australia 1840–1984). Adelaide: Royal Artillery Association of South Australia. ISBN 0-85864-098-8.
- Jobson, Christopher (1997). Royal Regiment of Australian artillery, Customs and Traditions (PDF). Canberra: Department of Defence. ISBN 0-642-27106-2.
- National Parks and Wildlife Service (NPWS) (November 1988). Fort Glanville Conservation Park Management Plan (PDF). Department for Environment and Planning. ISBN 0-7243-9069-3.
- O'Neill, Sally (1972). "Hart, John (1809–1873)". In Melbourne University Press (ed.). Australian Dictionary of Biography. National Centre of Biography, Australian National University. pp. 355–356.
- Parsons, Ronald (1986). Southern Passages, A Maritime History of South Australia. Netley, South Australia: Wakefield Press. ISBN 0-949268-67-4.
