= Arthur Child (judge) =

British judge at Trinidad and St Lucia

The Honourable Arthur Child (20 November 1852 – 24 August 1902) was a British lawyer, jurist and colonial administrator who was Chief Justice of St Lucia from 1890 to 1902.

== Career ==
Child was born in 1852, the 11th child of Henry Child, a solicitor in London. He was from a family of lawyers; two of his father′s brothers were also solicitors. He was educated privately at Priory-house School, Clapton and the University College London, and was called to the Bar at the Middle Temple on 17 November 1876.

After practicing on the South Eastern Circuit at the Mayor′s Court and the Central Criminal Court, he left for the West Indies when he was appointed Stipendiary Magistrate at San Fernando, Trinidad in 1882. He also acted as a puisne judge there from 1887 to 1888.

He was appointed acting Chief Justice of Saint Lucia in 1889, and confirmed in the position in 1890. He also administered the government on the island in 1894–95, and was a member of the Court of Appeal for the British Windward Islands. According to his obituary in The Times, he "was a sound lawyer and none of his decisions were ever reversed upon appeal to the Privy Council".

In Trinidad, he was captain commanding the San Fernando volunteers.

Child died in office at Castries, St Lucia, on 24 August 1902, leaving a widow and four sons.

Legal offices
Preceded by John Worrell Carrington	Chief Justice of St Lucia; 1890–1902	Succeeded by John Bayldon Walker
