= Terreplein =

Surface of a rampart

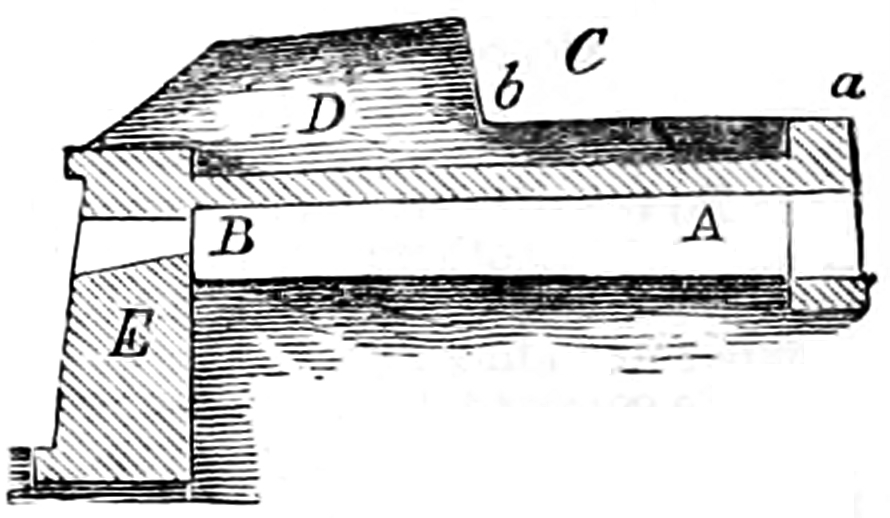
The terreplain (ab) on a casemate.

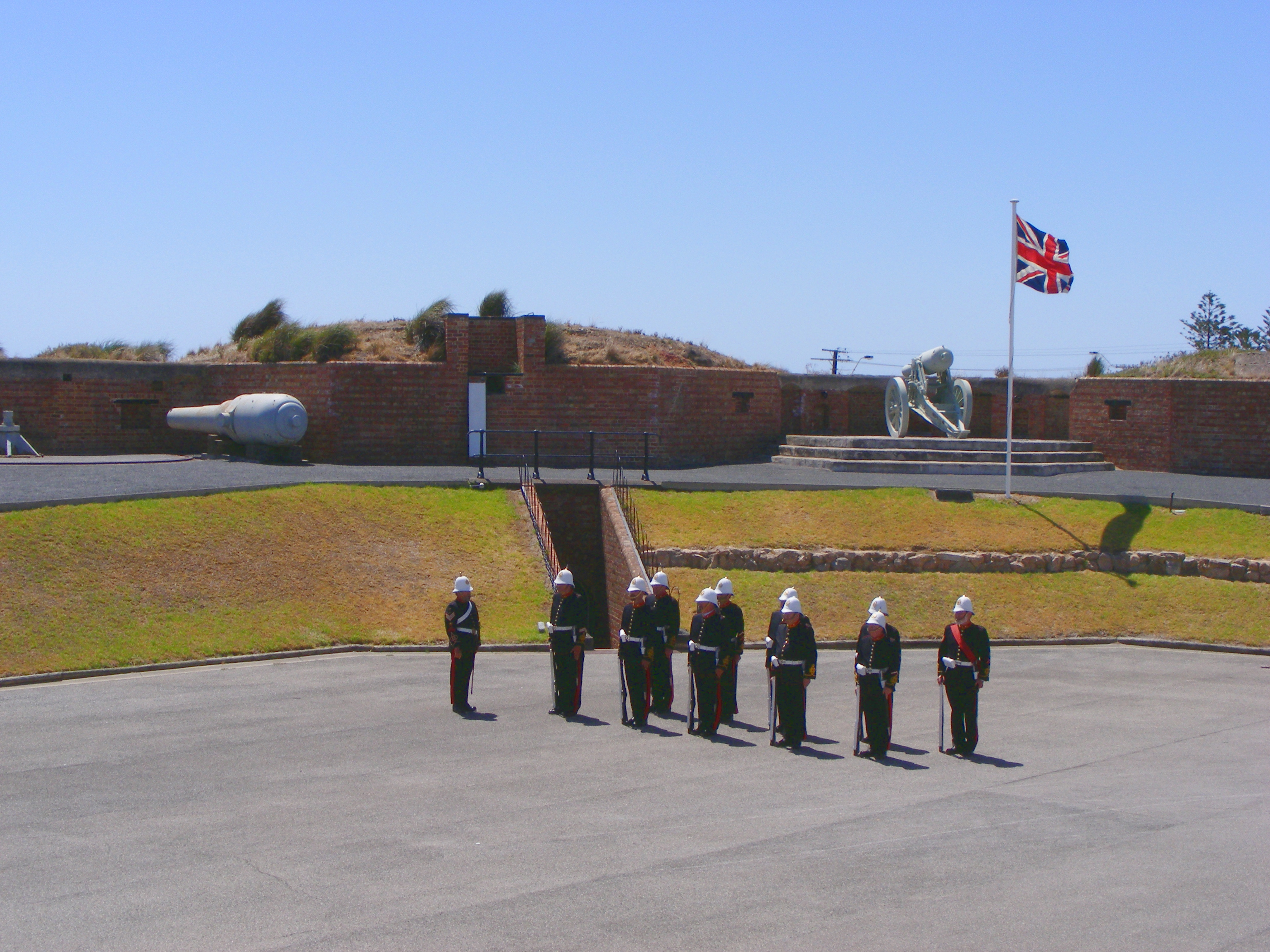
Manning Parade, terreplein, gun emplacements and the rear of the rampart at Fort Glanville.

In fortification architecture, a terreplein or terre-plein is the top, platform, or horizontal surface of a rampart, on which cannon are placed, protected by a parapet. In Martello towers, the roof or terreplein was sometimes surmounted with one or two cannon mounted on a gun platform with a central pivot, that enabled the guns to traverse up to 360 degrees.

In civil engineering works, a terreplein is an embankment of earth with a broad level top, which is sometimes excavated to form a continuation of an elevated canal across a valley.
