= James Sherrard Armstrong =

Lawyer, jurist, and landowner

James Sherrard Armstrong CMG (27 April 1821 – 23 November 1888) was a Canadian lawyer, jurist, and landowner from Quebec. From 1871, he served as the Chief Justice for the colony of Saint Lucia and in 1880, he was additionally appointed Chief Justice of Tobago. Resigning from both offices in 1882, he returned to his home at Sorel.

In 1886, he was given the chairmanship of the Royal Commission on the Relations of Capital and Labor in Canada. It was in a hearing of that commission that Olivier-David Benoît was to make his case about the conditions faced by workers in the boot and shoe industry.

He was appointed a Companion of the Order of St Michael and St George in the 1879 Birthday Honours.

== Notes ==
Legal offices
| Preceded by Joseph King Wattley, Jnr | Chief Justice of Tobago; 1880 – 1882 | Succeeded by John Worrell Carrington |
