= George Kellner =

British colonial administrator

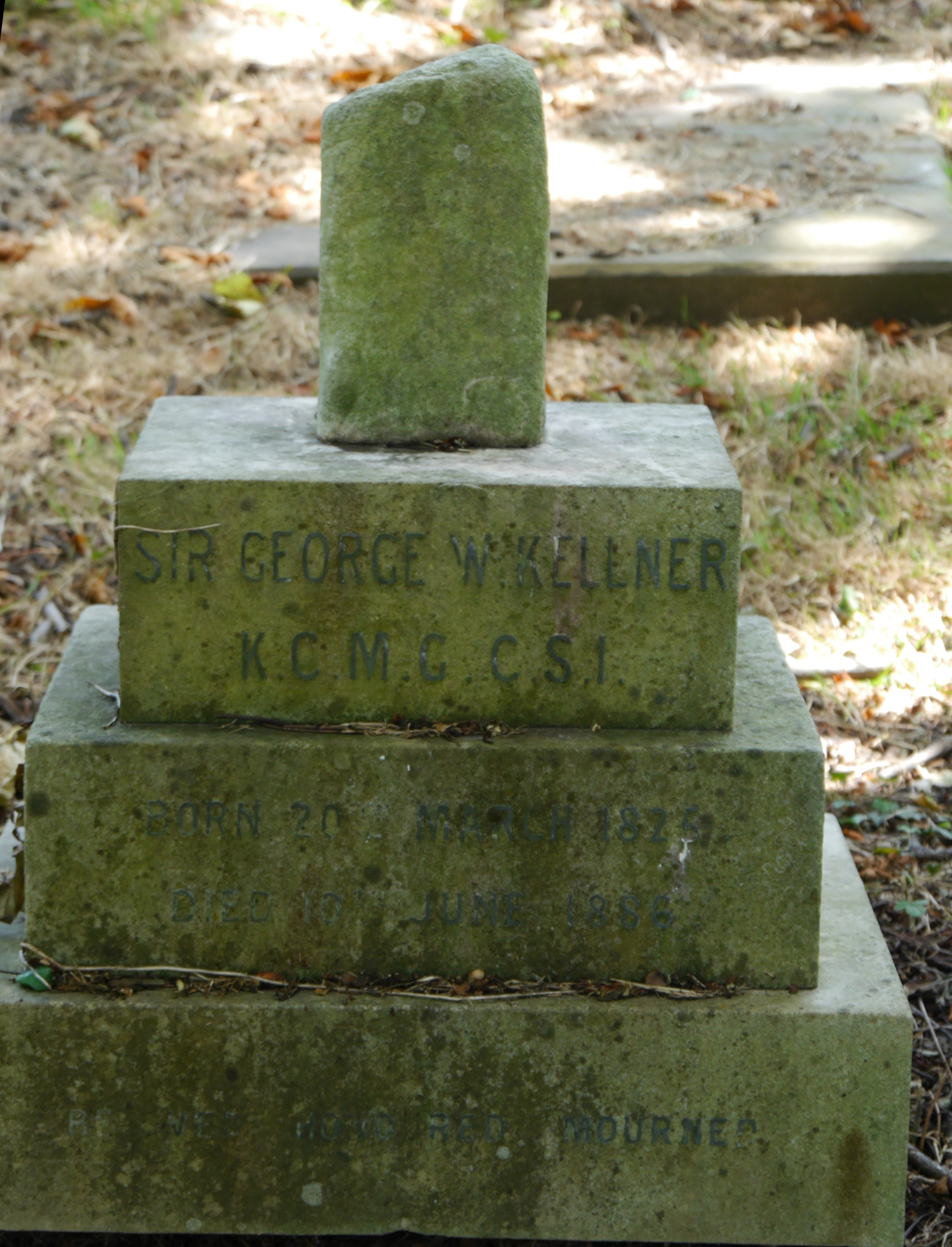
Monument, Kensal Green Cemetery

Sir George Francis Welsh Kellner KCMG CSI (baptised 15 May 1825 – 10 June 1886) was a British colonial administrator.

George Welsh Kellner was born in Calcutta, the son of Francis Daniel Kellner and Anne Henrietta Welsh. He was educated there at Doveton College.

Sir George Francis Kellner held various posts in India and later served in Cyprus. In 1884, he was appointed Assistant Paymaster-General in the Court of Chancery. Both he and his brother Edwin were accountants in the service of the East India Company and later in various governmental departments.

Sir George married Ann Caroline Gardiner (1830-1872) in Calcutta (Kolkata) in 1846. The couple had eight children.

His second wife was Jane Carter (1850-1926) of Dublin, Ireland, whom he married in London and with whom he had three children.

Some wrongly believe that Kellner and his brother Edwin Welsh Kellner had the franchise ("G. F. Kellner, and Co") for running European-style restaurants at the major railway stations in India. This misinformation is even included in books. However, this is not true. The confusion probably arose because the man who founded the company that had the railway franchise, George Ferdinand Kellner (G. F. Kellner), shared initials and a surname with Sir George Francis Kellner (G. F. Kellner). Moreover, the two men were contemporaries and both lived and worked in Calcutta, but were not related.

G.F.Kellner and Co. Ltd, the company started by George Ferdinand Kellner, survives as wine merchants in Kolkata.
