= Peter Scratchley =

Commissioner for Great Britain in New Guinea from 1884-1885

Sir Peter Scratchley
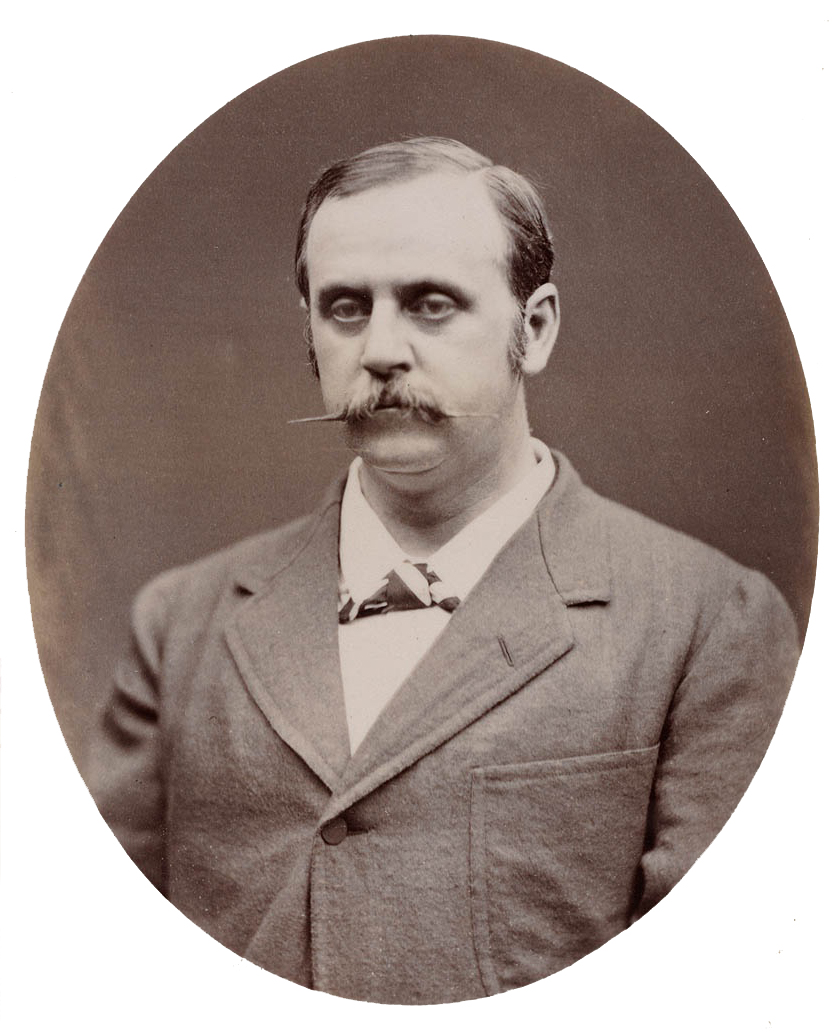
- Sir Peter Scratchley, c. 1882
- Born: 24 August 1835; Paris, France
- Died: 2 December 1885 (aged 50); Near the Territory of Papua
- Burial place: Old Charlton cemetery, England
- Military career
- Allegiance: United Kingdom
- Branch: British Army
- Service years: 1854–1882
- Rank: Major General
- Conflicts: Crimean War; Indian Rebellion of 1857
- Awards: Knight Commander of the Order of St Michael and St George
- Other work: Special Commissioner for Great Britain in New Guinea

Major General Sir Peter Henry Scratchley KCMG (24 August 1835 – 2 December 1885) was special commissioner for Great Britain in New Guinea 1884–1885 and defence adviser for Australia.

== Biography ==
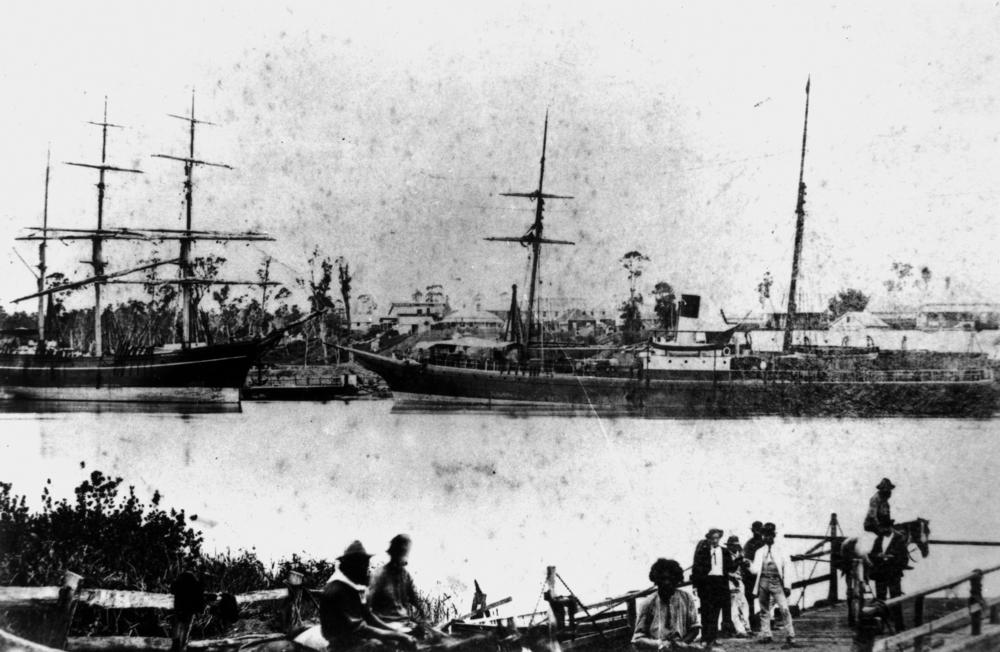
Governor Blackall, c. 1870.

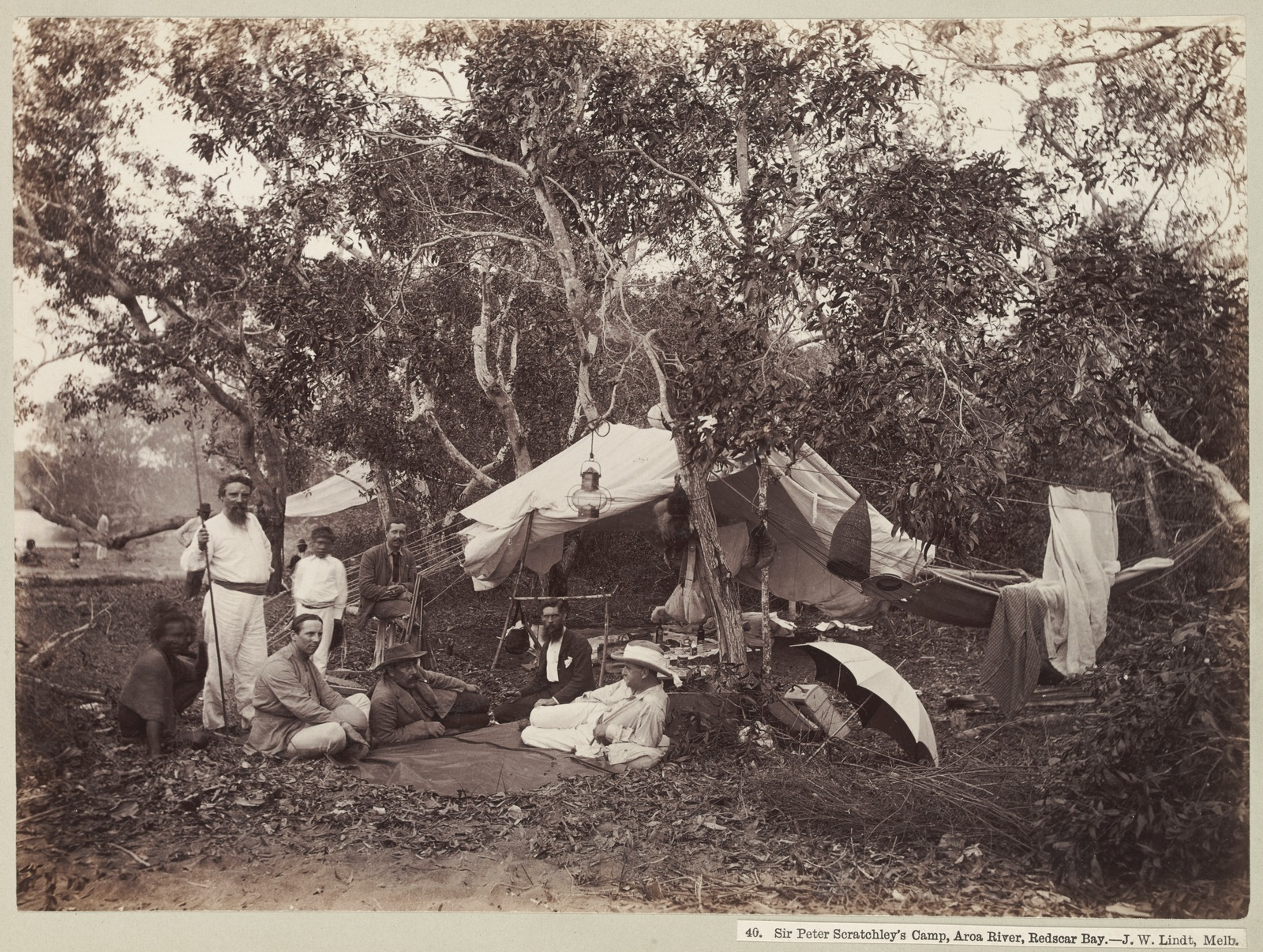
Sir Peter Scratchley's Camp, Aroa River, Redscar Bay (1885) J. W. Lindt State Library Victoria H42424

Scratchley was born in Paris, the thirteenth child of Dr James Scratchley, who was a soldier in the Royal Artillery, and his wife Maria, née Roberts. He was educated in Paris and attended the Royal Military Academy at Woolwich. After graduating he began his career as an Officer in the Royal Engineers. Scratchley served in the Crimea and Indian Mutiny and in October 1859 was made a captain. He then had several tours of duty in the Australian colonies advising on defence.

Following the withdrawal in 1870 of British garrison troops from Australia, Major General Sir William Jervois and then Lieutenant Colonel Scratchley were commissioned by a group of colonies to advise on defence matters. They inspected each colony's defences and produced the Jervois-Scratchley reports of 1877. Not surprisingly given their engineering backgrounds and the fear in the colonies of potential enemy fleets, the reports emphasised fortifications against naval attack. The Jervois-Scratchley reports formed the basis of defence planning in Australia and New Zealand for the next 30 years.

Among his achievements in Australia were:

- Founding of the Corps of Engineers in Victoria in 1860
- The fort on Bare Island, Botany Bay, New South Wales
- Fort Scratchley, Newcastle, New South Wales
- Fort Lytton, Brisbane, Queensland
- Fort Glanville, South Australia — assisted by Alexander Bain Moncrieff
- Fort Queenscliff, Queenscliff, Victoria

Scratchley retired with the honorary rank of Major-General on 1 October 1882, but was still employed as defence adviser for Australia by the Colonial Office. Scratchley soon contracted malaria and died at sea on aboard the Governor Blackall on 2 December 1885. He was buried in Melbourne and then reinterred to the Old Charlton cemetery in England. He left a widow, two daughters and a son.

== Honours ==
Scratchley was created a Knight Commander of the Order of St Michael and St George in June 1885.

Scratchley Road in Port Moresby, Mount Scratchley in the Owen Stanley Range near Kokoda in Papua New Guinea, and Fort Scratchley in Newcastle are named in his honour.

Government offices
New creation	Special Commissioner of British New Guinea; 1884–1885	Succeeded by Hugh Hastings Romilly (acting)
