= HMAS Canberra =

Three ships of the Royal Australian Navy have been named HMAS Canberra, for Canberra, the capital city of Australia.

- HMAS Canberra (D33), a County-class cruiser launched in 1927 and sunk after the Battle of Savo Island in 1942
- HMAS Canberra (FFG 02), an Adelaide-class guided missile frigate launched in 1978, decommissioned in 2005, and scuttled as a dive wreck in 2009
- HMAS Canberra (L02), lead vessel of the Canberra-class landing helicopter docks, launched in 2011, and active as of 2022

== Battle honours ==
Five battle honours are associated with the name HMAS Canberra.

- East Indies 1940–41
- Pacific 1941–42
- Guadalcanal 1942
- Savo Island 1942
- Persian Gulf 2002

== See also ==
- SS Canberra, a passenger liner launched in 1961, which served during the Falklands War as a troopship, and was sold for scrap in 1997
- USS Canberra (CA-70), a Baltimore-class cruiser that entered service in 1943, and decommissioned in 1970. The ship was named in honour of the cruiser Canberra and is the only ship of the United States Navy to carry the name of a foreign capital city.
- USS Canberra (LCS-30), an Independence-class littoral combat ship.
