= HMAS Canberra (L02) =

Royal Australian Navy helicopter landing ship

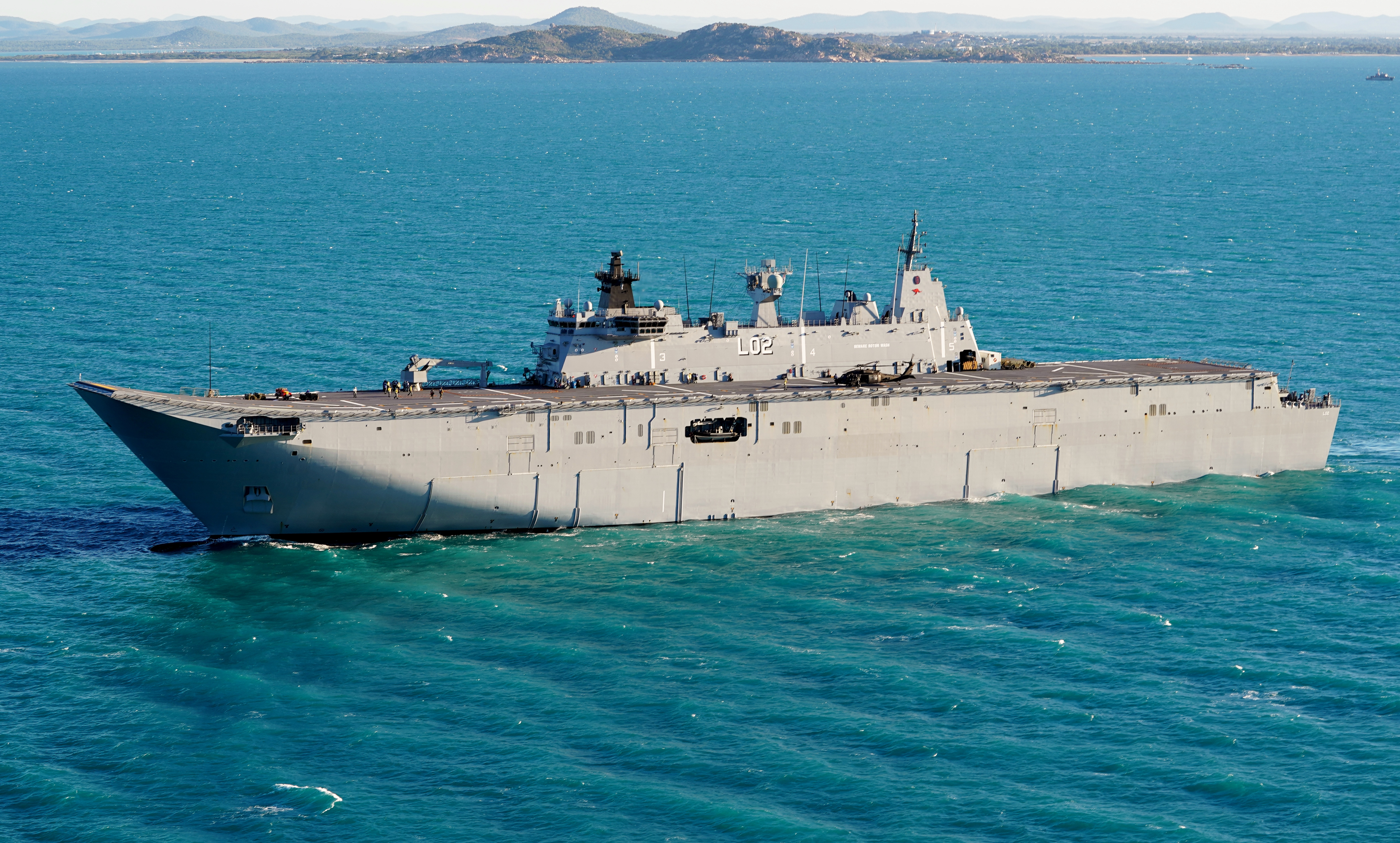

History

Australia
- Namesake: City of Canberra
- Builder: Navantia, Ferrol, Spain & BAE Systems Australia, Williamstown Dockyard, Australia
- Laid down: 23 September 2009
- Launched: 17 February 2011
- Commissioned: 28 November 2014
- Home port: Fleet Base East
- Identification: IMO number: 9608960; MMSI number: 503778000; Callsign: VKCN
- Motto: For King and Country
- Honours and awards: Battle honours: five inherited battle honours
- Status: Active
- Badge

General characteristics
- Class & type: Canberra-class landing helicopter dock
- Displacement: 27,500 tonnes (27,100 long tons) at full load
- Length: 230.82 m (757 ft 3 in)
- Beam: 32.0 m (105 ft 0 in)
- Draft: 7.08 m (23 ft 3 in)
- Propulsion: Combined diesel-electric and gas; 1 × GE LM2500 gas turbine; 2 × MAN 16V32/40 diesel generators; 2 × Siemens azimuth thrusters
- Speed: Over 20 knots (37 km/h; 23 mph) maximum
- Range: 9,000 nmi (17,000 km; 10,000 mi) at 15 knots (28 km/h; 17 mph)
- Endurance: 45+ days endurance
- Boats & landing craft carried: 4 × LLC
- Capacity: Up to 110 vehicles; Heavy vehicle deck: 1,410 m^{2} (15,200 sq ft); Light vehicle deck: 1,880 m^{2} (20,200 sq ft)
- Troops: 1,046
- Complement: 358 personnel; 293 RAN, 62 Australian Army, 3 RAAF
- Sensors & processing systems: Giraffe AMB radar, Saab 9LV combat system
- Electronic warfare & decoys: AN/SLQ-25C Nixie towed torpedo decoy; Nulka missile decoy
- Armament: 4 × Rafael Typhoon 25 mm remote weapons systems; 6 × 25mm Bushmaster chain gun; 1 x coaxially mounted M240 7.62mm machine gun
- Aircraft carried: 6 helicopters (standard); 18 helicopters (maximum hangar space)
- Aviation facilities: Flight deck with 13 degree ski-jump, 6 in-line deck landing spots

HMAS Canberra (L02) is the lead ship of the Canberra-class landing helicopter docks (LHD) and the Fleet Flagship of the Royal Australian Navy. Construction of the ship started in Spain in 2008, with the hull launched by Navantia in 2011. The hull was then transported to Australia in late 2012 for completion by BAE Systems Australia. Canberra was commissioned on 28 November 2014.

== Design ==
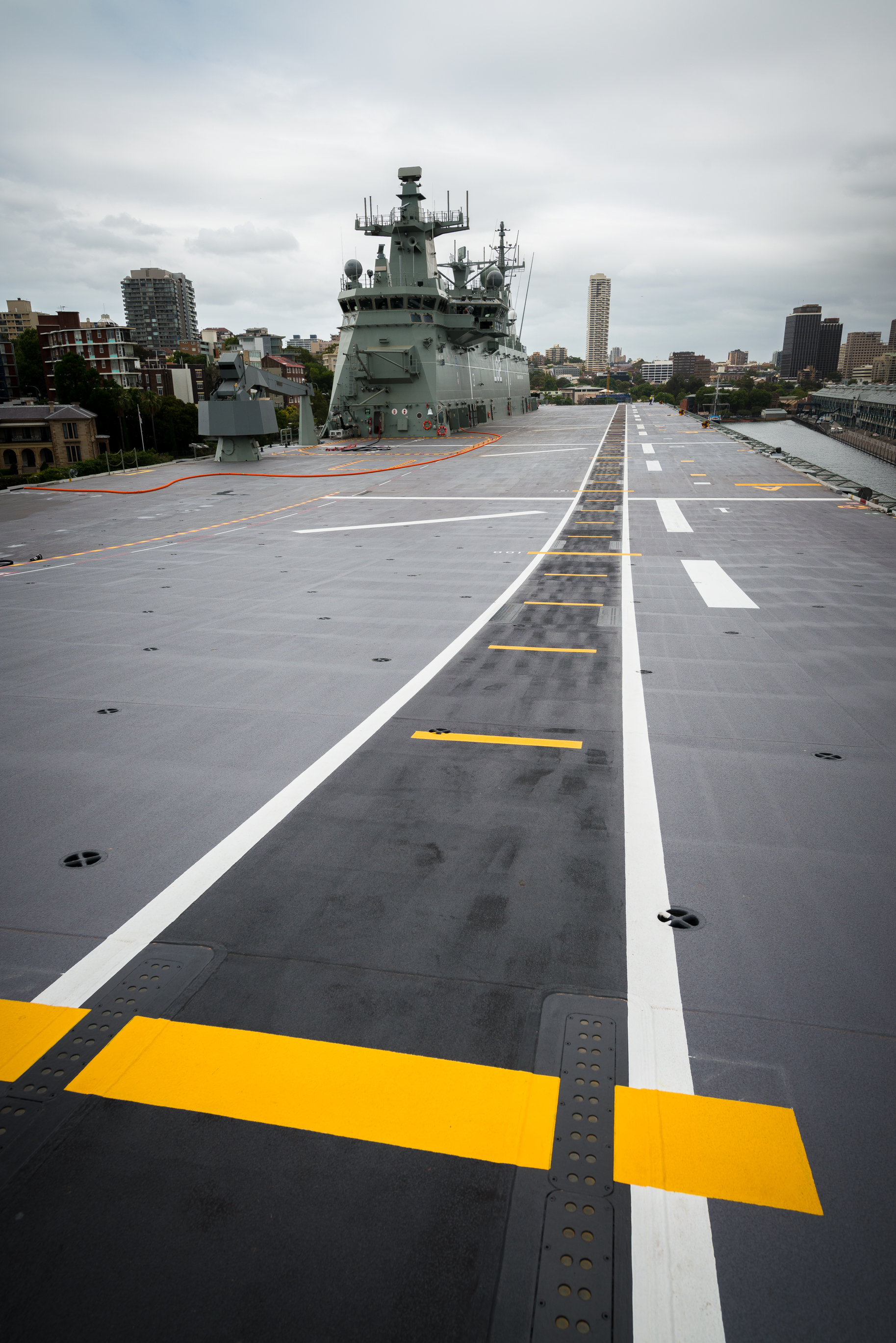
Canberra's flight deck and island superstructure

The Canberra class design is based on the warship Juan Carlos I, built by Navantia for the Spanish Navy. The contract was awarded to Navantia and Australian company Tenix Defence following a request for tender which ran from February 2004 to June 2007, beating the enlarged Mistral class design offered by French company Direction des Constructions Navales. Canberra has the same physical dimensions as Juan Carlos I, but differs in the design of the island superstructure and the internal layout, in order to meet Australian conditions and requirements. Unlike the Spanish vessel, the Australian ships are built to meet Lloyd's Naval Rules.

The Canberra-class vessels are 230.82 metres (757 ft 3 in) long overall, with a maximum beam of 32 metres (105 ft 0 in), and a maximum draught of 7.08 metres (23 ft 3 in). At full load, Canberra will displace 27,500 tonnes (27,100 long tons). Propulsion is provided by two Siemens 11-megawatt (15,000 hp) azimuth thrusters, each with an onboard electric motor, driving two 4.5-metre (15 ft) diameter propellers. The electricity is provided by a Combined Diesel-electric and Gas (CODAG) system, with a single General Electric LM2500 gas turbine producing 19,160 kilowatts (25,690 hp), supported by two MAN 16V32/40 diesel generators, each providing 7,448 kilowatts (9,988 hp). Maximum speed is over 20 knots (37 km/h; 23 mph), with a maximum sustainable full-load speed of 19 knots (35 km/h; 22 mph), and an economical cruising speed of 15 knots (28 km/h; 17 mph). Economical range is 9,000 nautical miles (17,000 km; 10,000 mi).

Each ship is fitted with a Saab 9LV Mark 4 combat management system. The sensor suite includes a Sea Giraffe 3D surveillance radar, and a Vampir NG infrared search and track system. For self-defence, the LHDs will be fitted with four Rafael Typhoon 25 mm remote weapons systems (one in each corner of the flight deck), six 12.7 mm machine guns, an AN/SLQ-25 Nixie towed torpedo decoy, and a Nulka missile decoy. Defence against aircraft and larger targets is to be provided by escort vessels and air support from the Royal Australian Air Force (RAAF). The ships' companies will consist of 358 personnel; 293 RAN, 62 Australian Army, and 3 RAAF.

The LHDs will transport 1,046 soldiers and their equipment. Canberra will be capable of deploying a reinforced company of up to 220 soldiers at a time by airlift. Two vehicle decks (one for light vehicles, the other for heavy vehicles and tanks) have areas of 1,880 square metres (20,200 sq ft) and 1,410 square metres (15,200 sq ft) respectively, and between them can accommodate up to 110 vehicles. The well deck will carry up to four LHD Landing Craft (LLC), which can be launched and recovered in conditions up to Sea State 4. The flight deck can operate six MRH-90-size helicopters or four Chinook-size helicopters simultaneously, in conditions up to Sea State 5. A mix of MRH-90 transport helicopters and Sikorsky S-70B Seahawk anti-submarine helicopters will be carried: up to eight can be stored in the hangar deck, and the light vehicle deck can be repurposed to fit another ten. The ski-jump ramp of Juan Carlos I has been retained for the RAN ships, although fixed-wing flight operations are not planned for the ships.

== Construction ==
Construction of Canberra began in September 2008, when the first steel was cut. The first three of 104 hull 'blocks' were laid down by Navantia at Ferrol in northern Spain on 23 September 2010. The hull was launched on 17 February 2011 by Vicki Coates, the widow of Rear Admiral Nigel Coates, a former commanding officer of the previous HMAS Canberra.

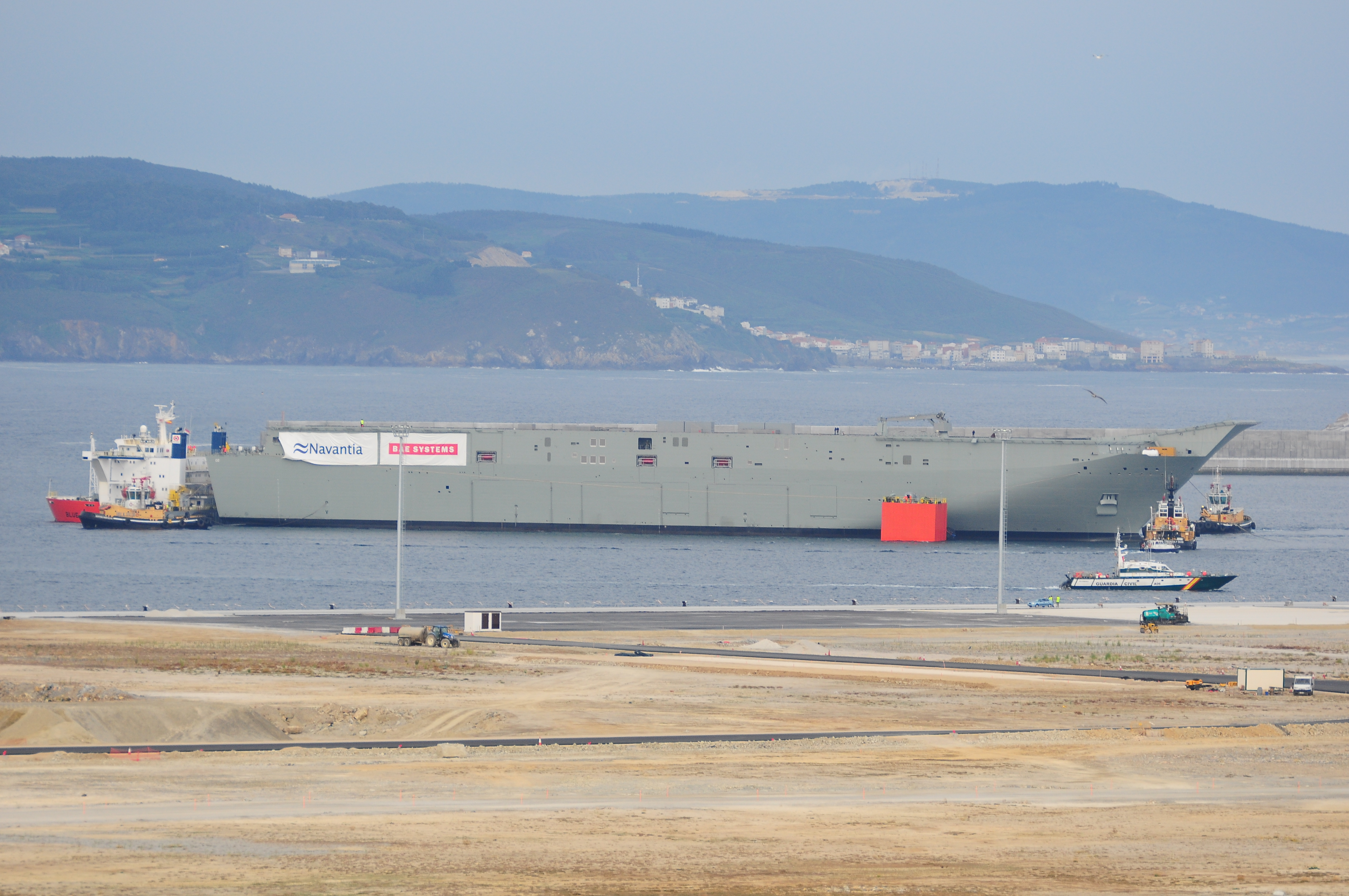
The hull of Canberra being floated onto the lift ship MV Blue Marlin, prior to sailing from Spain.

After the completion of the hull up to the level of the flight deck, Canberra was transported to Williamstown Dockyard. Canberra's hull was floated onto the heavy-lift ship MV Blue Marlin on 4 August 2012, with Blue Marlin departing on 17 August. The heavy lift ship sailed via the Cape of Good Hope to avoid the risk of the ship and her cargo being hijacked by Somali pirates. The decision to avoid the shorter route via the Suez Canal and Horn of Africa was made because other options to protect Blue Marlin and Canberra were unworkable: the frigate Anzac could not be diverted from anti-piracy duties in the region to provide a dedicated escort, and Dutch authorities objected to the presence of armed military or security personnel aboard the Dutch-flagged heavy lift ship. Canberra and Blue Marlin arrived in Port Phillip on 17 October. At Williamstown, the installation of Canberra's island superstructure and the internal fitout of the hull was completed by BAE Systems Australia (which acquired Tenix in mid 2008).

The ship was officially christened on 15 February 2013. BAE continued to build the vessel at Williamstown Dockyard integrating C3 and sensors to the ship's superstructures. Canberra commenced sea trials on 3 March 2014, sailing under power for the first time. The trials program included a visit to Fleet Base East in Sydney for drydocking tests, before returning to Williamstown for communications and weapons testing. The first phase of the trials resulted in vibration damage to decking when the thruster pods were run independently at high speed (instead of in tandem, as designed), and a melted circuit breaker board when primary and emergency power systems were activated simultaneously, along with the discovery of a crack in the hull from the delivery voyage, and excessively corroded propeller nuts. The second phase of contractor-run sea trials began in July, after repairs were made, and had concluded by early September.

Canberra was handed over by BAE Systems to the Defence Materiel Organisation on 9 October 2014. The ship was commissioned on 28 November 2014 at Fleet Base East. Although identified as "LHD01" during construction, Canberra received the pennant number "L02" on commissioning; the pennant number corresponding to that used by the frigate of the same name.

== Operational history ==
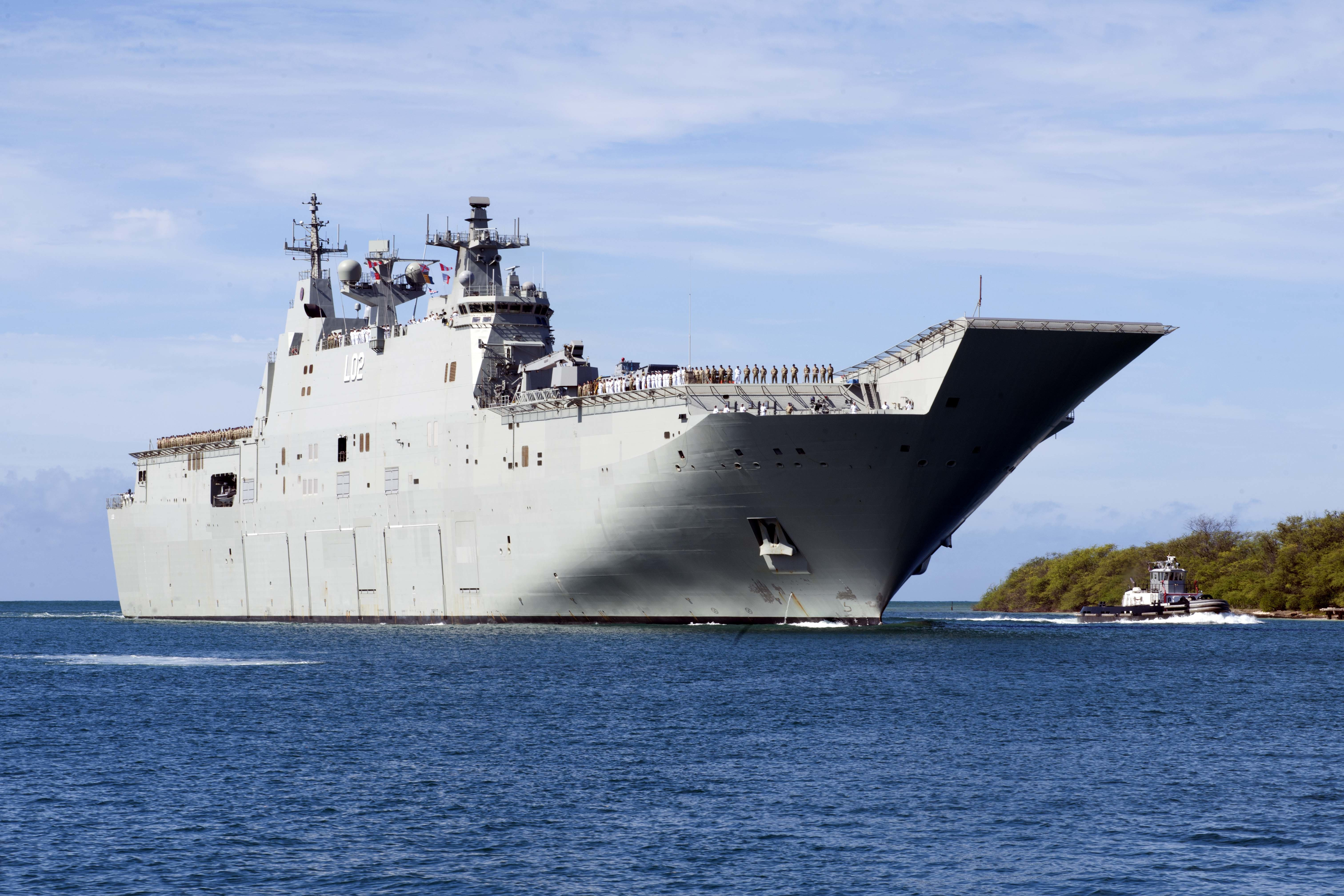
HMAS Canberra arriving at Pearl Harbor for RIMPAC 2016

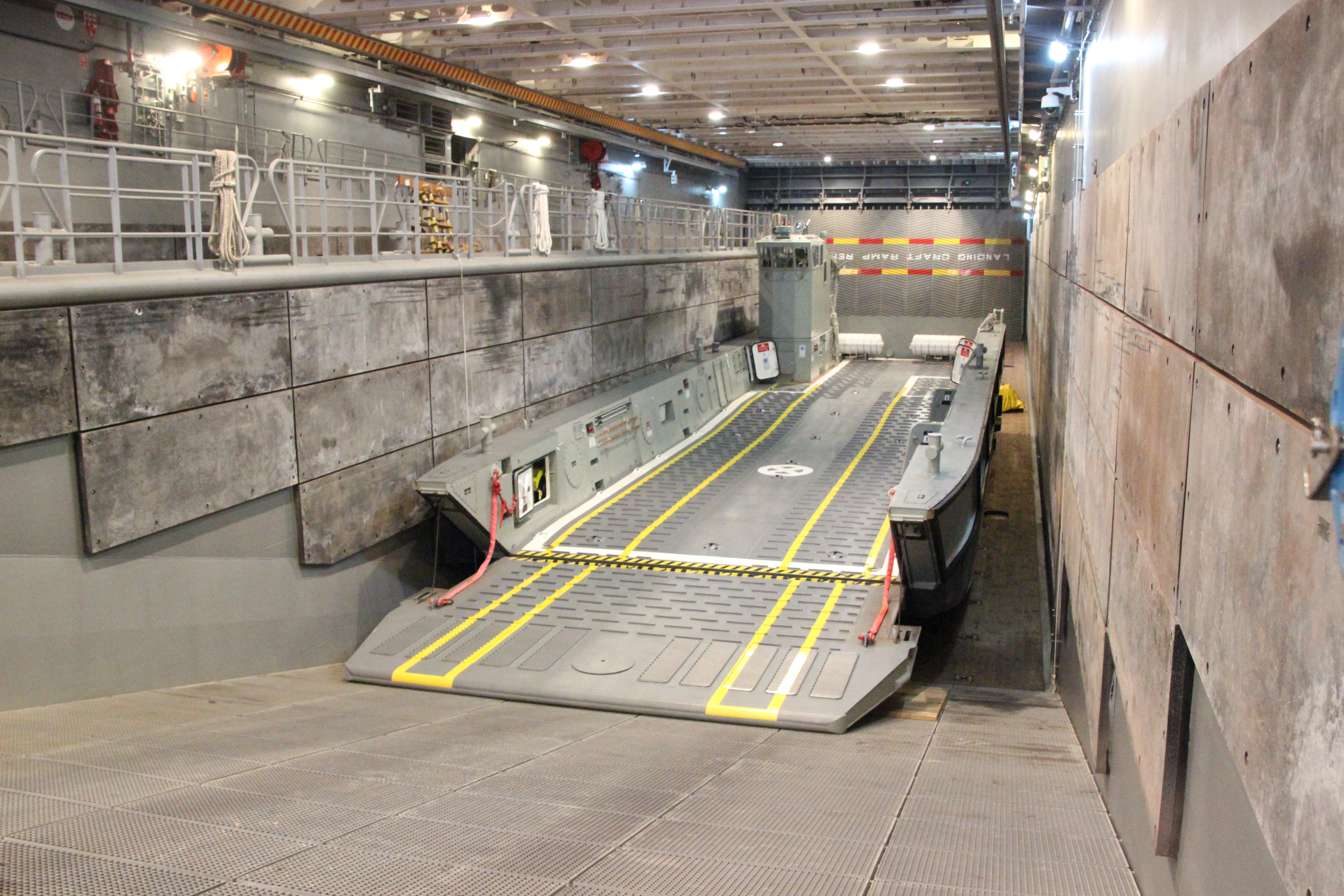
LLC landing craft on the well deck of Canberra

Canberra during exercise RIMPAC 2016

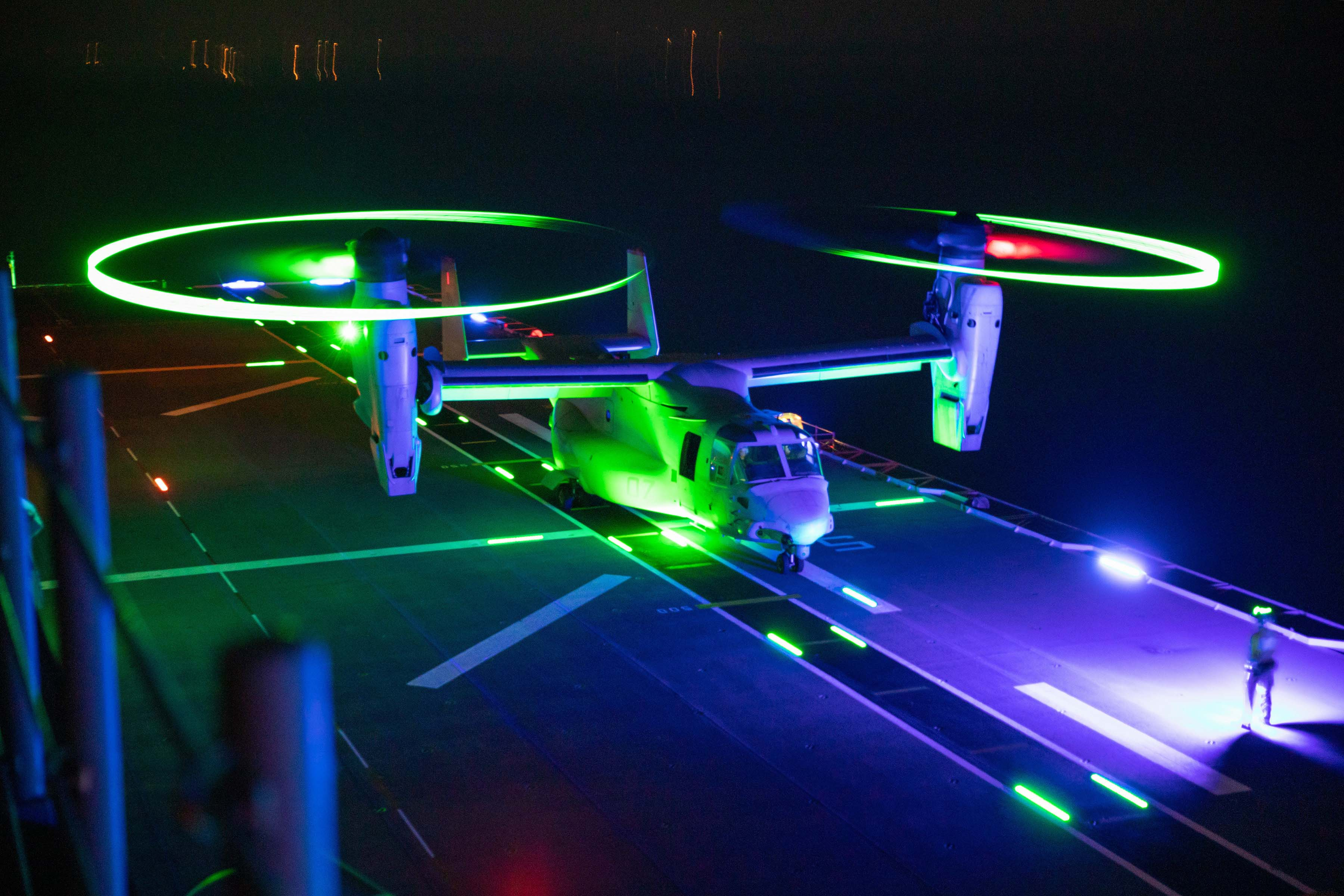
U.S. Marine Corps MV-22B Osprey landing on Canberra

Canberra was the centrepiece of Australia Day celebrations in Sydney on 26 January 2015. In March 2015, the ship was designated the flagship of the RAN.

In February 2016, the ship was deployed from Fleet Base East initially to Brisbane in Queensland where it loaded a Royal Australian Army Engineer squadron and equipment including beach landing capabilities, water purification equipment and other essential engineering stores and then it sailed to Fiji on its first humanitarian mission after a tropical cyclone hit the country on February 20. The LHD was carrying 50 tonnes of humanitarian supplies including food, water, and medical equipment as well as more than 850 personnel from the Australian Defence Force. Embarked with the ship were three MRH-90 helicopters to support Australian operations. The Canberra joined other ADF assets to help with relief efforts.

Canberra formed part of the Australian force which participated in the RIMPAC 2016 exercise off Hawaii during mid-2016. During this deployment she successfully completed flight trials with United States military Sikorsky CH-53E Super Stallion and Bell Boeing V-22 Osprey aircraft.

In May 2017, issues with the vessel's azimuth thrusters were detected. Interim repairs were made.

In August 2020, three missing Micronesian sailors were found alive and well on Pikelot Island in Micronesia. Canberra dispatched a helicopter to provide food and water and check the men for injuries.

Canberra participated in RIMPAC 2022.

On 21-23 July 2023, Canberra participated in the commissioning of USS Canberra (LCS-30):

- 21 July - both ships enter Sydney Harbour and Fleet Base East
- 22 July - Commissioning of USS Canberra
- 23 July - Freedom of Entry to Canberra, Australian Capital Territory (see image gallery)

On 4 June 2025, Canberra was travelling along New Zealand's coast on approach to Wellington when its navigation radar caused insurmountable interference with wireless and radio signals over a large area spanning Taranaki in the North Island to the Marlborough District in the South Island, blocking Internet service and radio broadcasts. When made aware, Canberra's crew changed her systems to non-interfering frequencies.

== Sources ==
=== Journal articles and papers ===
- "Amphibious Ships" (PDF). Semaphore. 2007 (14). Sea Power Centre – Australia. October 2007. Archived from the original (PDF) on 14 May 2009.
- Borgu, Aldo (2004). "Capability of First Resort? Australia's Future Amphibious Requirement". Australian Strategic Policy Institute. Archived from the original on 6 July 2011.
- Brown, Nick (28 June 2007). "Spanish designs are Australia's choice for warship programmes". International Defence Review.
- Fish, Tim (15 June 2010). "Amphibious assault ships: Striking distance". Jane's Defence Weekly.
- Fish, Tim (28 September 2009). "First Australian LHD takes shape". Jane's Navy International.
- Fish, Tim (5 February 2010). "Steel cut for second Australian LHD". Jane's Navy International.
- Gillis, Kim (2007). "Interview. Landing Helicopter Dock Project – Canberra Class". DefenceToday. 6 (3): 28–29. ISSN 1447-0446.
- Kerr, Julian (22 December 2011). "Amphibious ambitions: expanding Australia's naval expectations". Jane's Navy International. Jane's Information Group.

=== News articles ===
- "Huge Navy ship hull arrives in Victoria". ABC News. 17 October 2012.
- "HMAS Canberra enters commission into Australian Navy at Sydney ceremony". ABC News. Australian Broadcasting Corporation. 28 November 2014.
- "Australia Day 2015: Whip cracking, lamington eating, thong throwing and barbies feature as Australians celebrate around the country". ABC News. Australian Broadcasting Corporation. 27 January 2015.
- Cavas, Christopher P. (18 February 2011). "Australia's Largest Ship Launched". Defense News.
- "LHD launch paves the way for amphibious transformation". Department of Defence (Australia). 18 February 2011.
- Kennedy, Emily (4 March 2014). "Canberra's size and power tested at sea trials". Navy Daily. Royal Australian Navy. Archived from the original on 7 July 2014.
- Kennedy, Emily (11 September 2014). "Canberra sea trials a success". Navy News. Directorate of Defence News, Department of Defence. p. 5. Archived from the original on 22 November 2019.
- Kennedy, Emily (9 October 2014). "First Landing Helicopter Dock accepted by Defence Materiel Organisation". Navy Daily. Royal Australian Navy. Archived from the original on 27 November 2020.
- Lillebuen, Steve (15 February 2013). "Navy gets new helicopter landing dock ship". The Australian. Australian Associated Press (AAP).
- "On the way to Australia". Navy News. 55 (16). Royal Australian Navy (Directorate of Defence News): 5. 30 August 2012.
- "Navantia efectúa con éxito el ´encaje´ del ´Canberra´". Laopinióncoruña (in Spanish). 4 August 2012.
- "El "Blue Marlin", abandonando el puerto exterior de A Coruña". La voz de Galicia. 17 August 2012.
- McPhedran, Ian (5 June 2014). "A brand new 27,000 tonne Australian Navy ship was damaged during maiden sea trials". news.com.au. Archived from the original on 31 August 2015.
- Perrett, Bradley (25 February 2013). "Australia's Biggest-Ever Warships Still On Track". Aviation Week.
- Stewart, Cameron (6 November 2012). "Warship's 12,000-mile detour gives high-seas pirates a wide berth". The Australian. pp. 1–2.

=== Web and other sources ===
- "Amphibious Assault Ship (LHD)". Royal Australian Navy.
- "Beach SOS saves men stranded on tiny Micronesian island". BBC News. 4 August 2020.
