= USS Canberra =

Two ships of the United States Navy have been assigned the name USS Canberra, in honor of HMAS Canberra (D33) and the city of Canberra, Australia's capital.

- USS Canberra (CA-70) was a Baltimore-class cruiser, launched in 1943 and struck in 1978.
- USS Canberra (LCS-30), an Independence-class littoral combat ship, commissioned in 2023.
