= Vilu =

- Village
- Location in Guadalcanal
- Coordinates: 9°18′21″S 159°46′3″E
- Country: Solomon Islands
- Province: Guadalcanal
- Island: Guadalcanal
- Time zone: UTC+11 (UTC)

Vilu is a village in Guadalcanal, Solomon Islands. It is located 29.8 kilometres (18.5 mi) by road northwest of Honiara.

It hosts the Vilu Military Museum.
