= HMAS Canberra (D33) =

Australian heavy cruiser (1928-1943)

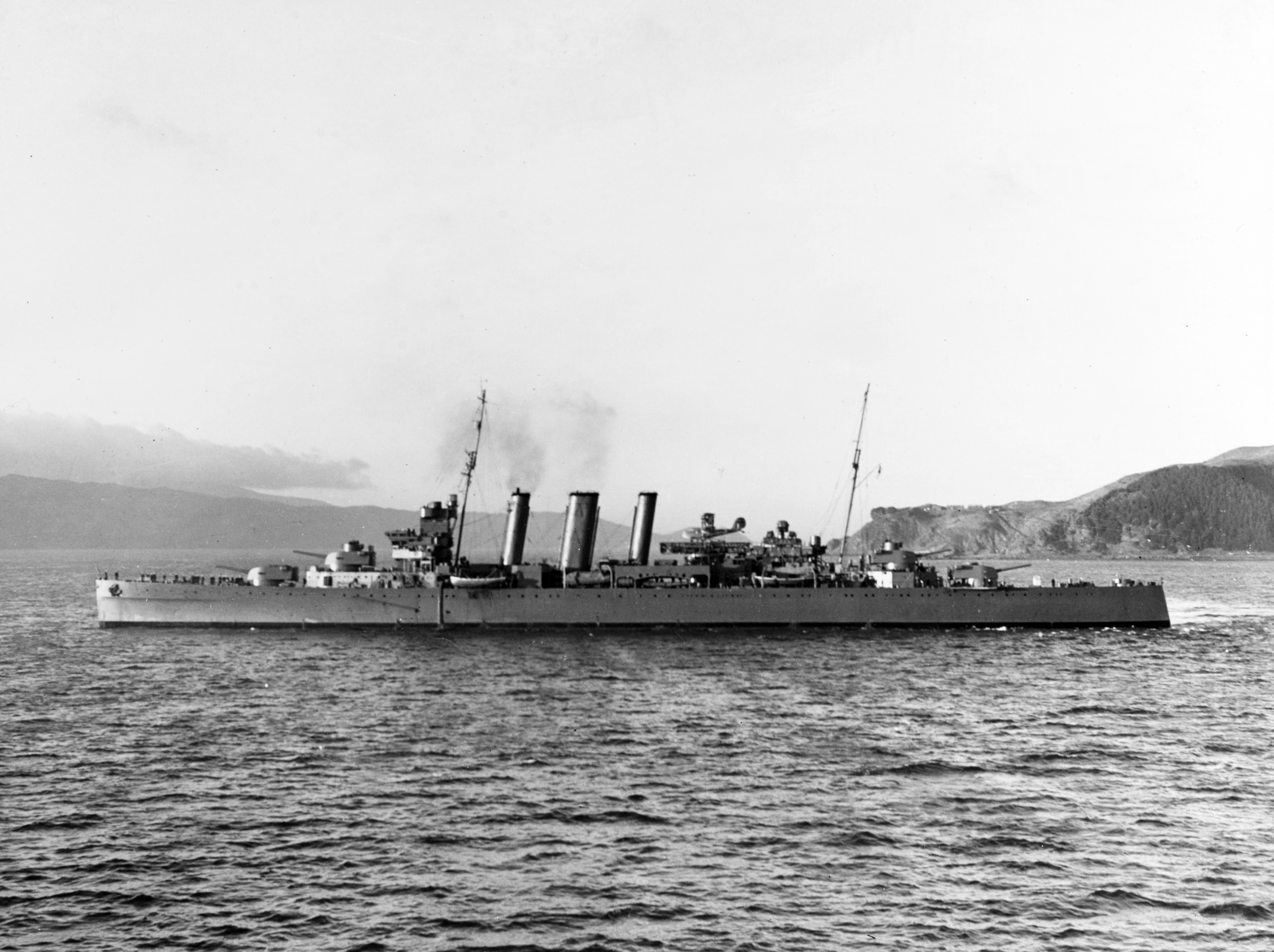
- HMAS Canberra departing Wellington Harbour in July 1942

History

Australia
- Namesake: Canberra
- Builder: John Brown & Company, Clydebank, Scotland
- Yard number: 513
- Laid down: 9 September 1925
- Launched: 31 May 1927
- Completed: 10 July 1928
- Commissioned: 9 July 1928
- Motto: Pro Rege, Lege et Grege; Latin: "For the King, the Law, and the People"
- Honours and awards: Battle honours: East Indies 1940–41; Pacific 1941–42; Guadalcanal 1942; Savo Island 1942
- Fate: Scuttled, after heavy damage off Savo Island on 9 August 1942
- Badge

General characteristics
- Class & type: County-class cruiser; Kent sub-class
- Displacement: 9,850 tons (light); 10,000 tons (standard)
- Length: 590 ft (180 m) between perpendiculars; 630 ft 1 in (192.05 m) overall
- Beam: 68.25 ft (20.80 m)
- Draught: 21 ft 4 in (6.50 m) (maximum)
- Propulsion: 8 Yarrow boilers, 4 shaft Brown-Curtis geared turbines, 80,000 shp
- Speed: 31.5 knots (58.3 km/h; 36.2 mph) (maximum); 12 knots (22 km/h; 14 mph) (cruising)
- Range: 2,870 nautical miles (5,320 km; 3,300 mi) at 31.5 knots (58.3 km/h; 36.2 mph); 13,200 nautical miles (24,400 km) at 12 knots (22 km/h; 14 mph)
- Complement: Pre-war: 690 standard; 710 as flagship; Wartime: 751 standard; 819 at loss
- Armament: 4 × 2 – 8-inch (203 mm) guns (4 twin turrets); 4 × 1 – 4-inch (102 mm) anti-aircraft guns; 4 × 1 – 2-pounder (40 mm) quadruple pom-poms; 4 × 1 – 3-pounder (47 mm) saluting guns; 12–16 .303-inch machine guns; 2 × 4 – 21-inch (533 mm) torpedo tubes; 4 × multiple pom-poms (installed 1942); 5 × 1 – 20 mm Oerlikon guns
- Armour: 1.5 to 3 inches (38 to 76 mm) armour deck over machinery spaces and magazines; up to 2 inches (51 mm) over turrets; up to 3 inches (76 mm) on conning tower; Anti-torpedo bulges
- Aircraft carried: 1 amphibious aircraft (initially Seagull III, later Walrus)

HMAS Canberra (I33/D33), named after the city of Canberra, was a Royal Australian Navy (RAN) heavy cruiser of the Kent sub-class of County-class cruisers. Constructed in Scotland by John Brown & Company during the mid-1920s, the ship was commissioned in 1928, and spent the first part of her career operating primarily in Australian waters, with some deployments to the China Station.

At the start of World War II, Canberra was initially used for patrols and convoy escort around Australia. In July 1940, she was reassigned as a convoy escort between Western Australia, Sri Lanka, and South Africa. During this deployment, which ended in mid-1941, Canberra was involved in the hunt for several German auxiliary cruisers. The cruiser resumed operations in Australian waters, but when Japan entered the war, she was quickly reassigned to convoy duties around New Guinea, interspersed with operations in Malaysian and Javanese waters. Canberra later joined Task Force 44, and was involved in the Guadalcanal campaign and the Tulagi landings.

On 9 August 1942, Canberra was struck by the opening Japanese shots of the Battle of Savo Island, and was quickly crippled, and according to the crew, she was torpedoed by friendly fire. Unable to propel herself, listing heavily and burning, the cruiser was evacuated and then sunk in Ironbottom Sound by two American destroyers. The United States Navy Baltimore-class cruiser USS Canberra was named in honour of the Australian ship. Later, in 2023, the US Navy named the new Independence-class littoral combat ship USS Canberra after Canberra, which became the first US warship commissioned in a foreign port.

== Design ==
Canberra was one of seven Kent-class cruisers—a subclass of the County-class cruiser—designed by Eustace Tennyson-d'Eyncourt. The ship was 590 feet (180 m) long between perpendiculars and 630 feet 1 inch (192.05 m) overall, with a beam of 68.25 feet (20.80 m), and a maximum draught of 21 feet 4 inches (6.50 m). She displaced 9,850 tons at light load, and 10,000 tons at standard load. The Kent class were built to meet the restrictions of the Washington Naval Treaty; with a reduction in armament and protection. Canberra was powered by eight Yarrow boilers which fed steam to four Brown-Curtis geared turbines; these in turn provided 80,000 shaft horsepower (60,000 kW) to the ship's four propeller shafts. The cruiser could reach speeds of 31.5 knots (58.3 km/h; 36.2 mph), which could be maintained for 2,870 nautical miles (5,320 km), although 13,200 nautical miles (24,400 km) could be travelled at the more economical 12-knot (22 km/h; 14 mph) standard cruising speed. Before World War II, the ship's company was normally 690 (49 officers, 641 sailors); this increased to 710 when acting as a flagship. During wartime service, the normal company expanded to 751 (61 officers, 690 sailors), and at the time of her loss, 819 people were aboard.

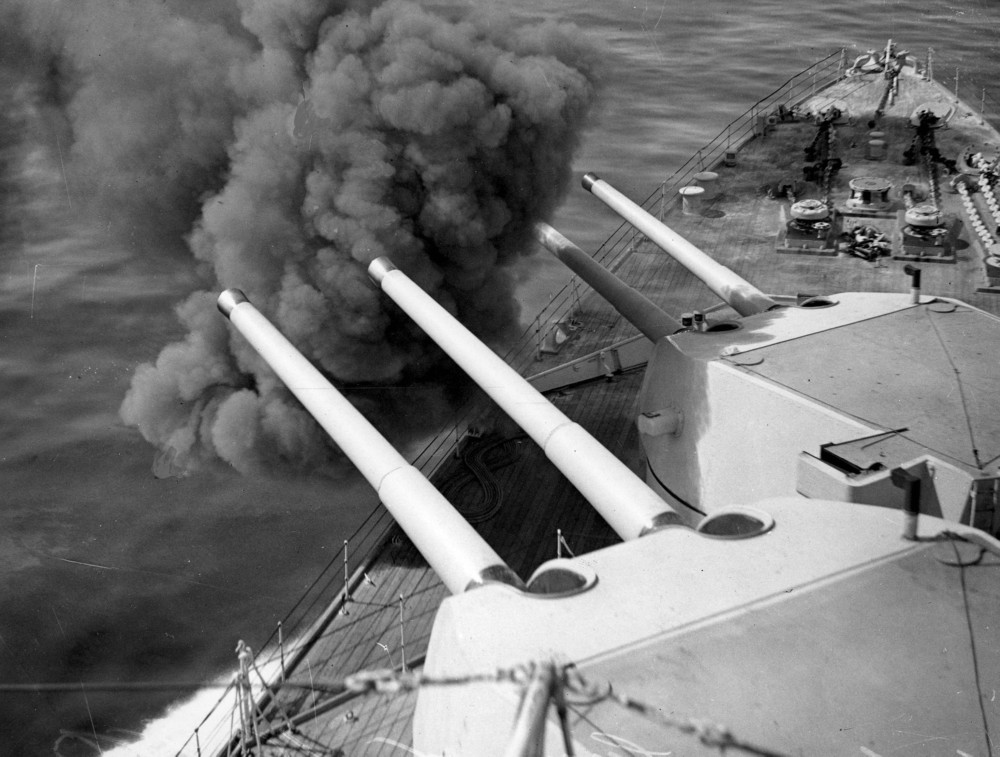
Canberra's forward 8-inch gun turrets (designated "A" and "B")

Canberra's main armament consisted of eight 8-inch Mark VIII guns in four twin turrets. Secondary armament consisted of four 4-inch quick-firing high-angle guns and four 2-pounder "pom-pom" guns. A mixture of .303-inch machine guns were carried for close defence work: initially this consisted of four Vickers machine guns and twelve Lewis machine guns, although four Lewis guns were later removed. During a refit in 1942, two multiple pom-poms and five 20 mm Oerlikons were added to enhance the anti-aircraft armament. Four 3-pounder quick-firing Hotchkiss guns were used as saluting guns. Two sets of quadruple 21-inch torpedo tubes were fitted. Depth charges were carried: these were deployed by rails.

The cruiser was designed to carry a single amphibious aircraft: initially a Supermarine Seagull III aircraft, but this was replaced in 1936 by the Supermarine Walrus. However, the aircraft catapult was not installed until April 1936, during a refit in Sydney. Before this, the Seagull amphibian was lowered into the water by the ship's recovery crane and took off from there. Armour aboard Canberra was limited to an armour deck over the machinery spaces and magazines, ranging from 1.5 to 3 inches (38 to 76 mm) in thickness. Armour plate was also fitted to the turrets (up to 2 inches (51 mm) thick) and the conning tower (3 inches (76 mm) thick). Anti-torpedo bulges were also fitted.

In 1924, the Australian government ordered two Kent-class cruisers to replace the ageing light cruisers Sydney and Melbourne. These ships were to be named Australia and Canberra, with both to be built by John Brown & Company, at its shipyard in Clydebank, Scotland: the only two County-class ships built in Scotland. Canberra was laid down on 9 September 1925, and given the yard number 513. Canberra was launched on 31 May 1927 by Princess Mary; the first ship of the RAN launched by a member of the Royal Family. Work on the ship was completed on 10 July 1928, the day after the cruiser was commissioned into the RAN. Most of the initial ship's company came from Sydney. Canberra cost approximately A£2 million to construct.

== Operational history ==
=== Pre-war ===
Canberra left Portsmouth on 4 December 1928, after several months of workup trials, and arrived at Sydney on 16 February 1929. The cruiser operated primarily in Australian waters during the next ten years, spending periods of time as the RAN flagship. On 20 September 1929, during a round-Australia cruise, the ship grounded on a sand shoal outside Roebuck Bay. The damage did not prevent the ship from operating, and it was not until early 1930 that the affected hull plates were replaced. In September 1931, Canberra visited New Caledonia and Fiji. The cruiser operated on the Royal Navy's China Station in 1932 and 1937. In 1934 the ship was assigned to escort HMS Sussex, which was transporting the Duke of Gloucester during a visit to Australia. In August 1936 she brought Admiral Sir Murray Anderson to Sydney, Australia to be invested as Governor of New South Wales.

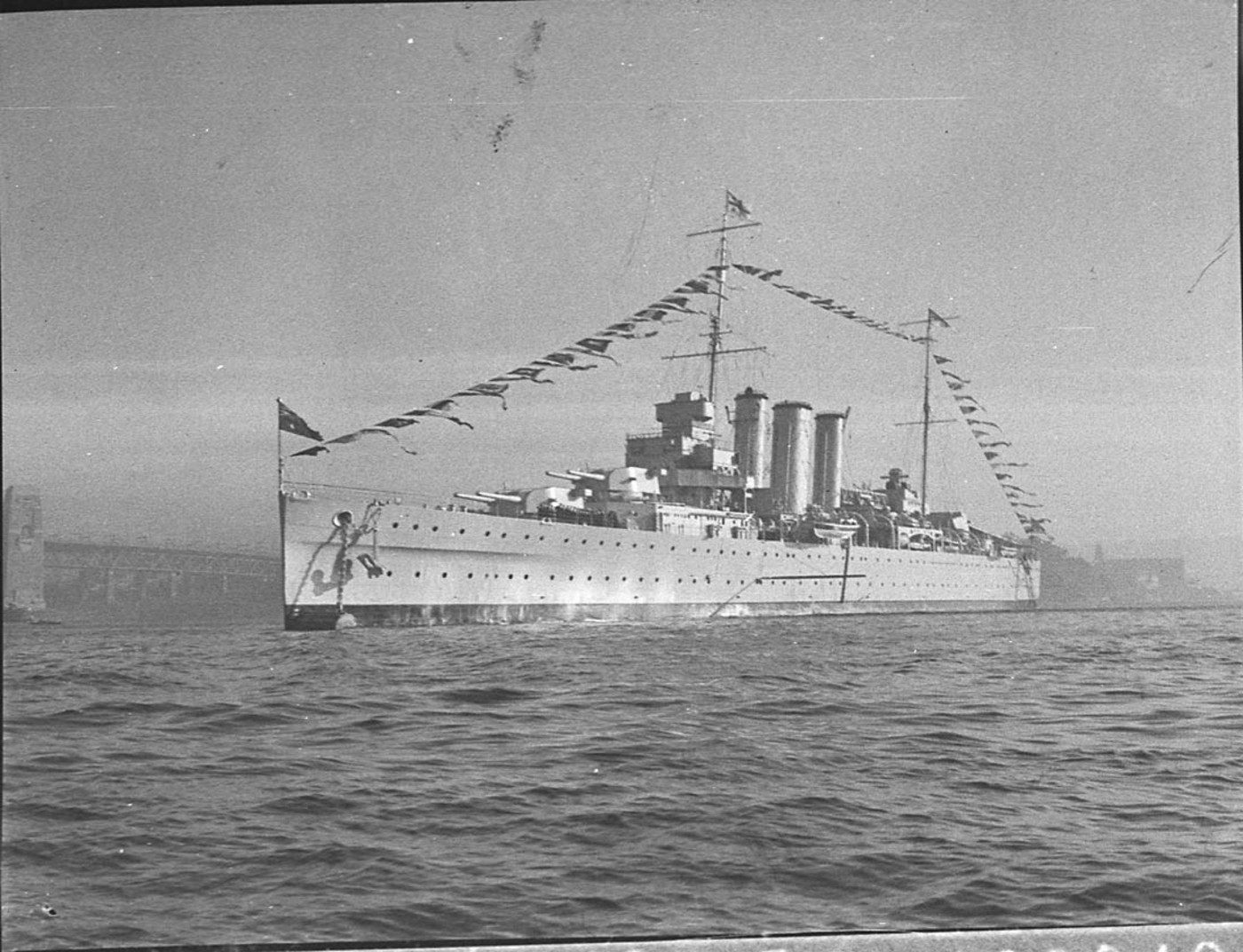
Canberra entering Sydney Harbour on 6 August 1936. The cruiser is carrying Admiral Sir Murray Anderson, who was to be invested as Governor of New South Wales.

=== World War II ===
For the first nine months of World War II, Canberra was assigned to patrol and escort duties around Australia. In January 1940, the cruiser escorted the first convoy carrying Australian and New Zealand soldiers, Anzac Convoy US 1, to the Middle East. During May, Canberra joined sister ship Australia to escort Anzac Convoy US 3 across the Indian Ocean; the convoy was diverted via the Cape of Good Hope following fears that Italy was about to join the war. On 26 June, Canberra left Australia with the troopship Strathmore for Cape Town, where the cruiser was assigned to the Indian Ocean as a convoy escort between Fremantle, Colombo, and Cape Town. During November, Canberra attempted to locate the German merchant raider Atlantis. She returned unsuccessful to Fremantle on 20 November, but sailed that night with a skeleton crew after the merchant ship SS Maimoa signalled that she was under attack by a German merchant raider (the auxiliary cruiser Pinguin). Although unable to find Maimoa or her attacker, Canberra encountered three lifeboats on 22 November, which carried 27 sailors who had escaped from SS Port Brisbane, another victim of Pinguin. The cruiser returned to Fremantle on 27 November without encountering the German raider. Shortly after, Canberra headed for the East Indies Station.

In February 1941, Canberra was involved in efforts to locate the German pocket battleship Admiral Scheer. In early March, Canberra encountered two merchant ships; a tanker supplying a possible merchant raider, which split up and fled when ordered to stop. Canberra pursued the suspected raider, and fired on her from maximum range to avoid a retaliatory attack, while her Walrus amphibian attempted to stop the tanker by dropping several bombs. Both ships (the raider supply ship Coburg and the captured Norwegian tanker Ketty Brøvig) had commenced scuttling after the first attack from their pursuit, but the Australians continued attacking: the Walrus used all her bombs, while Canberra fired 215 shells, many of them misses. A post-action analysis found that if Canberra had closed before firing, the same quantity of damage could have been achieved for less ammunition, and one or both ships might have been captured.

Canberra was assigned back to Australia in July; operating around the western and southern coasts. The cruiser was in Sydney in December 1941, when Japan entered the war: Canberra was quickly reassigned to convoy duties around New Guinea, interspersed by operations in Malaysian and Javanese waters. On 12 December 1941, the cruiser was ordered from Sydney to meet the Pensacola Convoy, hoisting the flag of Rear-Admiral John G. Crace as she stopped in Brisbane on 15 December. In company with HMAS Perth she sailed for the vicinity of New Caledonia to meet the light cruiser HMNZS Achilles and the convoy.

In January 1942, Canberra and HMAS Vampire escorted the troopship Aquitania, leaving Sydney 10 January, carrying reinforcements to Singapore as far as Ratai Bay, Sunda Strait where the reinforcements were transshipped into seven smaller vessels for the final run to Singapore. She was then part of the escort for that convoy, "MS.2A" of six Dutch KPM vessels and one British vessel, to Singapore arriving 24 January. During her return voyage via the Dutch East Indies, the cruiser was assigned to the ANZAC Squadron. A refit occurred in Sydney from February to May 1942, during which Canberra became the first Australian warship to be fitted with radar (a Type 241 surface search set, and an A290 air-warning set). The cruiser was present in Sydney Harbour during the Japanese midget submarine attack on 31 May-1 June. Although not damaged, at 04:40, Canberra recorded that the Japanese may have fired torpedoes at her. This may have been one of many false alarms throughout the night; however, one of the midget submarines had attempted to fire its torpedoes at a target, but these did not release because of damage sustained during the infiltration. The observer aboard Canberra may have seen bubbles from the compressed air released to fire the torpedoes.

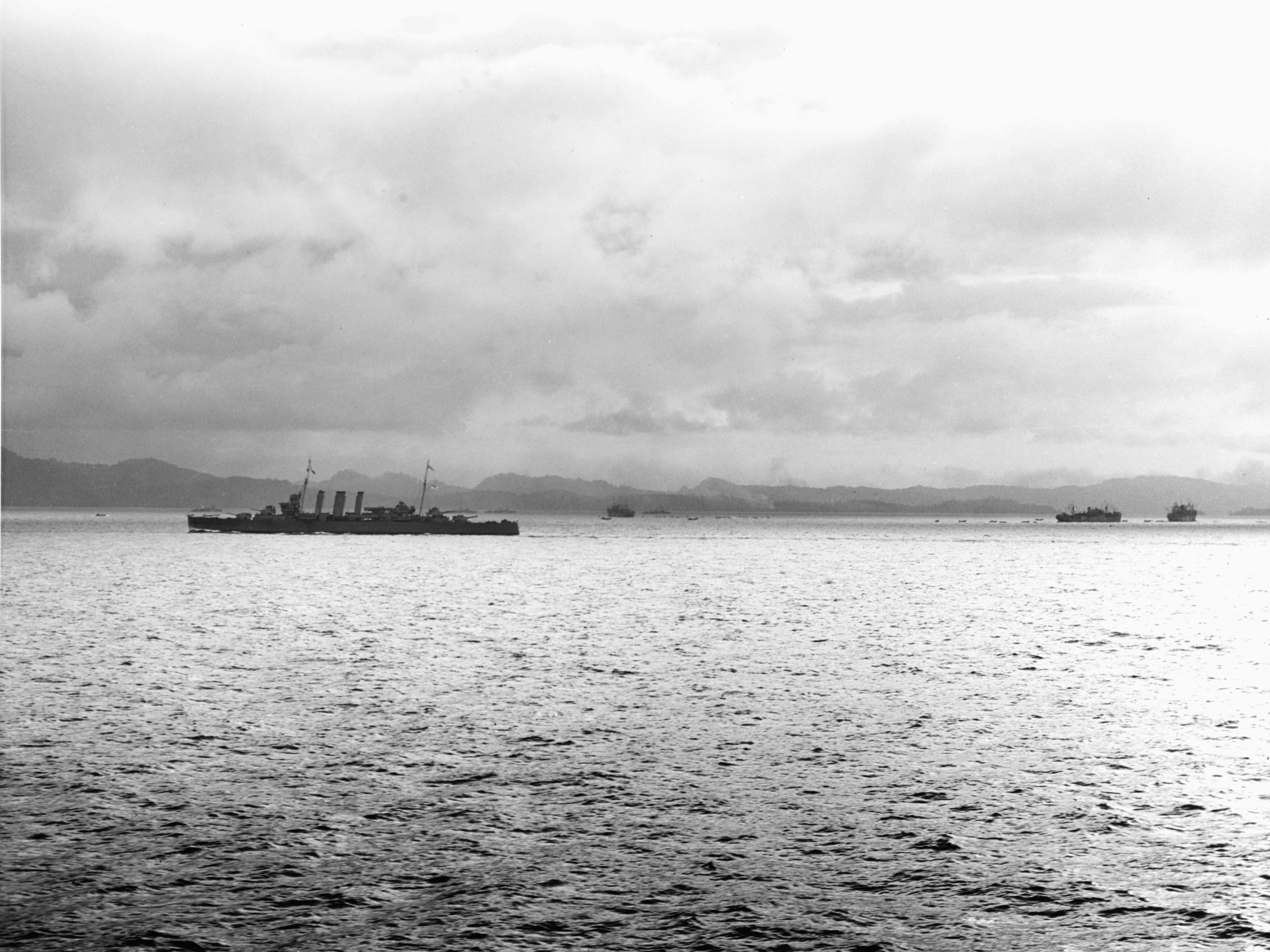
Canberra underway off Tulagi during the landings on 7–8 August 1942. Three transports are among the ships visible in the distance, with Tulagi and the Nggela Islands beyond.

The cruiser headed north the day after the submarine attack to join the ANZAC Squadron, which had been redesignated Task Force 44. On 17 June, Canberra took part in offensive patrols through the Coral Sea, and from July, she was assigned to Operation Watchtower; the opening stages of the Guadalcanal campaign. The cruiser escorted the force to be landed at Tulagi from 5 August, and screened the force during the landings on 7 and 8 August; the cruiser encountered no initial resistance.

== Loss ==
During the afternoon of 8 August, a Japanese task force commanded by Vice Admiral Gunichi Mikawa and consisting of five cruisers and a destroyer began to approach the south of Savo Island, with the intention to attack the naval force supporting the landing at Guadalcanal, then those at Tulagi. Anticipating a naval attack following several assaults by land-based Japanese aircraft, the Allied commander of the naval forces, Rear Admiral Victor Crutchley, split his forces around Savo Island: Crutchley aboard HMAS Australia led Canberra, USS Chicago, and the destroyers USS Patterson and USS Bagley on patrol of the southern waters. At 20:45, Crutchley was recalled to meet urgently with US Admiral Richmond K. Turner, overall commander of the amphibious landings. Although Chicago was the senior ship after Australia departed, Canberra, which had been following Australia, found herself at point. Around 01:00 on 9 August, the engines of scout planes from Mikawa's ships were heard, but as no warning came from the other groups, it was assumed they were friendly.

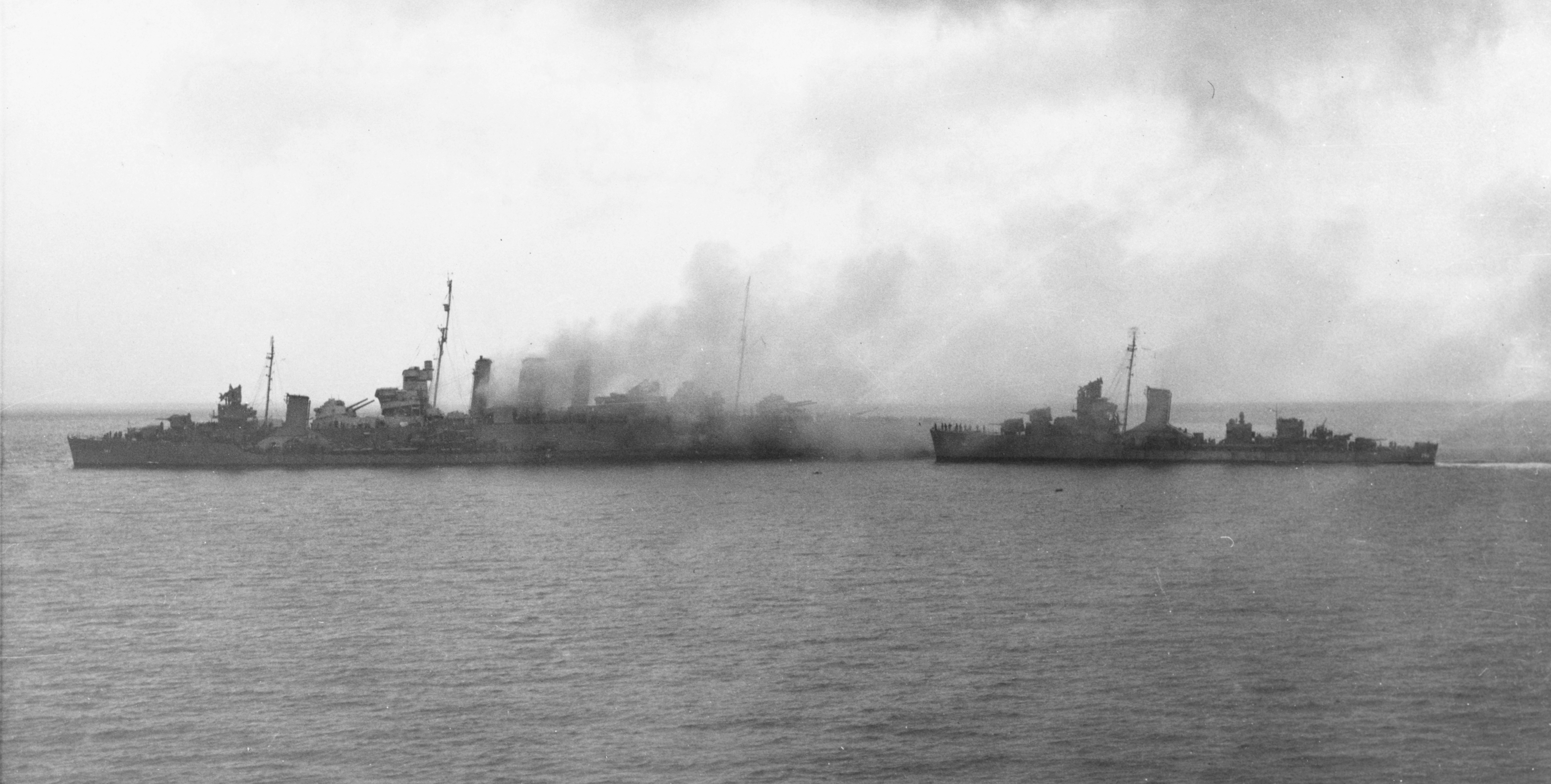
American destroyers rescuing the surviving crew from Canberra after the Battle of Savo Island. USS Blue is alongside Canberra's port bow, while USS Patterson is approaching from astern.

At 01:45, Patterson detected Mikawa's ships and alerted the Allied force. The Japanese scout planes dropped flares to silhouette Canberra and Chicago. The Australian cruiser was able to avoid the Japanese torpedoes fired at the start of the engagement but was on the receiving end of the Japanese cruisers' gunfire. The first two salvos killed or wounded several senior officers, disabled both engine rooms, damaged the bridge and 4-inch gun platform and forced the flooding of her 8-inch (203 mm) magazines. Within two minutes, the cruiser had been hit 24 times; she was immobilised, without power, and listing to starboard, with multiple internal fires and at least a fifth of her personnel dead or wounded. At least one torpedo strike was reported during the Japanese attack, although none of the 19 torpedoes fired at Canberra by the Japanese cruisers were recorded as hitting their target. Several personnel from Canberra believe that USS Bagley inadvertently torpedoed the cruiser. From the 819-strong ship's company, 84 were killed (74 during the battle, 10 dying later from wounds), and another 109 were wounded.

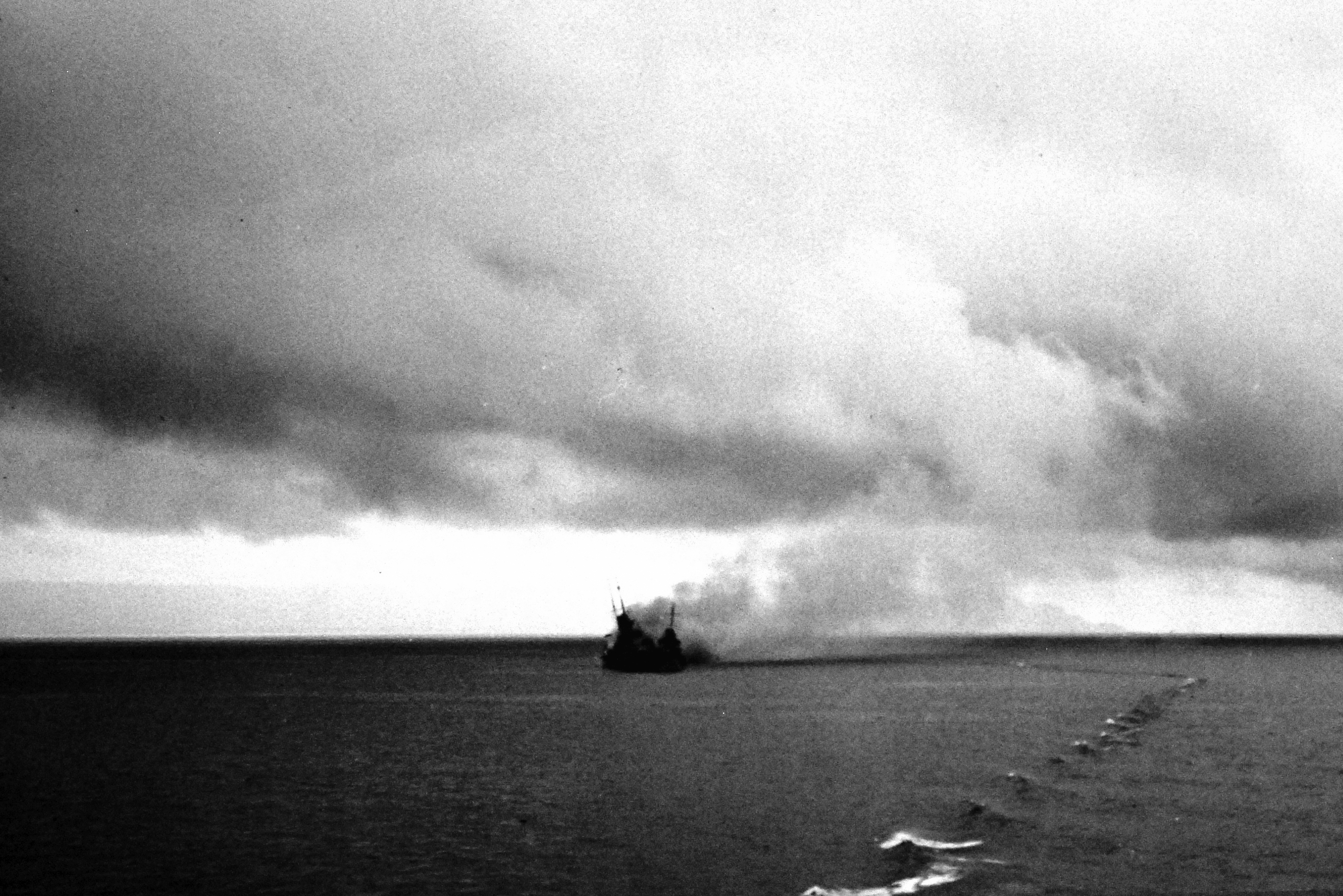
Canberra sinking, 9 August 1942

At 03:30, Patterson came alongside and relayed orders from Rear Admiral Turner: if Canberra could not achieve mobility by 06:30, she would be abandoned and sunk. The destroyer began to recover the Australian survivors, but at 04:30, Patterson detected an approaching ship. The destroyer moved to investigate, at which point the unknown ship opened fire, and Patterson retaliated. It was quickly realised that the attacker was USS Chicago, which had mistaken Canberra for a damaged Japanese vessel, and both ships ceased fire. Patterson returned to continue the evacuation, and was aided by sister ship USS Blue.

While still afloat, and in no apparent danger of sinking, damage control and repair options were being evaluated. It was determined that Canberra's engines could not be repaired by the 0630 deadline, and she was to be scuttled, instead of being towed over to Tulagi harbor for emergency repairs. She was torpedoed by the destroyer USS Ellet at 08:00, after 263 5-inch (127 mm) shells and four other torpedoes fired by USS Selfridge failed to do the job, and sank at coordinates 09°12′29″S 159°54′46″E. She was one of the first ships to be sunk in what was eventually named "Ironbottom Sound". Three US cruisers were also destroyed during the battle and a US destroyer damaged.

== Aftermath ==
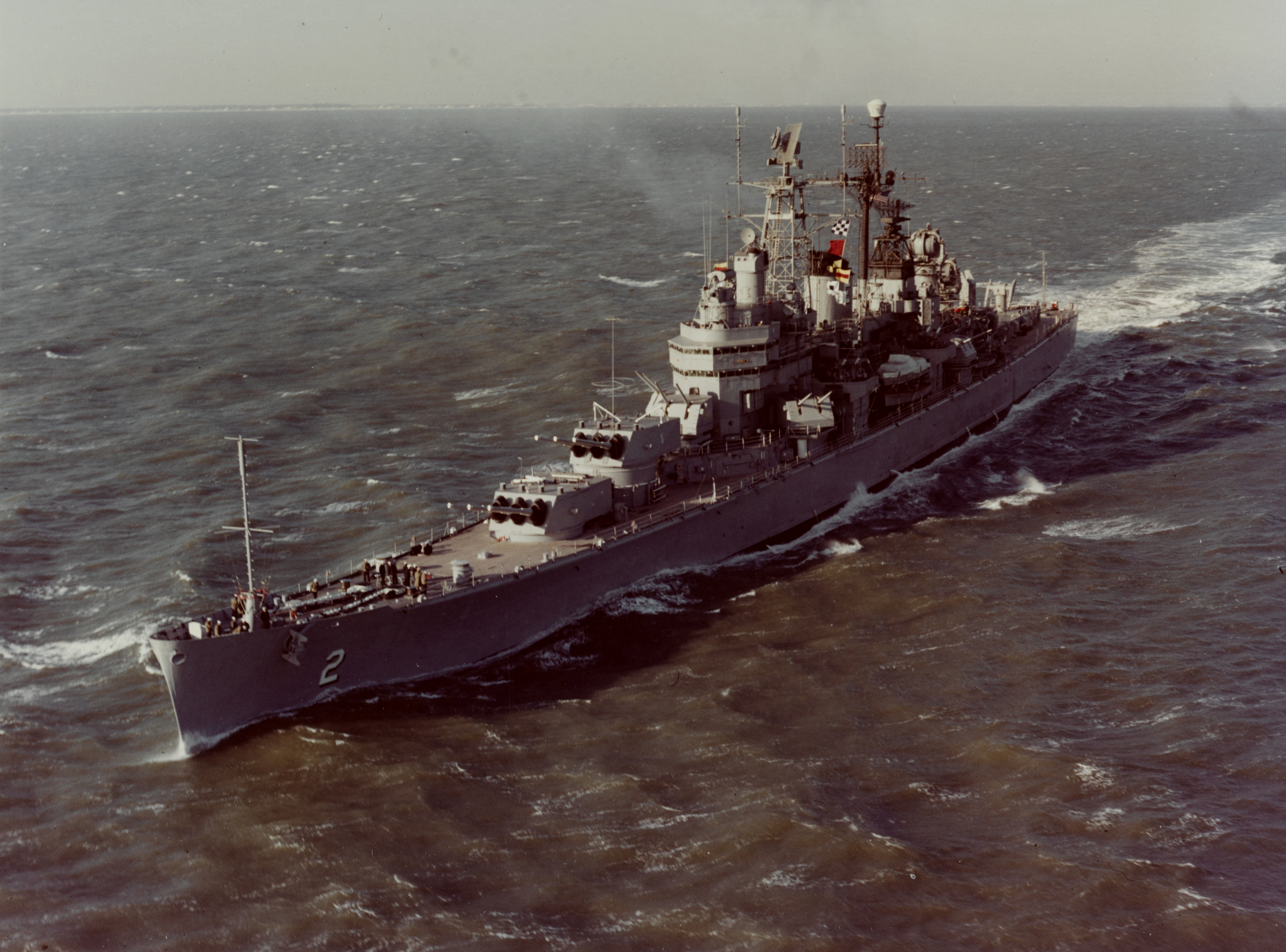
The US cruiser USS Canberra underway in 1961

Captain Howard Bode of USS Chicago was formally criticised for his actions during the battle, particularly for not taking lead when Australia departed, and for not warning the northern cruiser force of the approaching Japanese ships. In recognition of the valour displayed by the Australian ship and her company, United States President Franklin Delano Roosevelt wished to commemorate the loss of HMAS Canberra by naming a US ship in her honour. The under-construction Baltimore-class cruiser Pittsburgh was selected to be renamed USS Canberra. The ship was launched on 19 April 1943 by (Alice,) Lady Dixon, the wife of Sir Owen Dixon, Australia's ambassador to the United States, and is the only United States warship to be named after a foreign capital city. Later, in 2023, the US Navy named a new Independence-class littoral combat ship also after the Canberra, which became the first US warship commissioned in a foreign port.

Around the same time, the British government announced that the heavy cruiser HMS Shropshire (a sister ship to Canberra, but of the London subclass) would be transferred to the RAN as a gift. Although King George VI had announced that the ship would be renamed Canberra, the duplication of ship names with the United States Navy was against RAN policy. Although it was thought that Australia had a greater claim to the name, the Australian government decided to retain Shropshire's old name after learning that the US offer had come directly from President Roosevelt. Many of the first Australian sailors posted to Shropshire in early 1943 were Canberra survivors.

Canberra's wartime service was recognised with four battle honours: "East Indies 1940–41", "Pacific 1941–42", "Guadalcanal 1942", and "Savo Island 1942".

=== Rediscovery ===
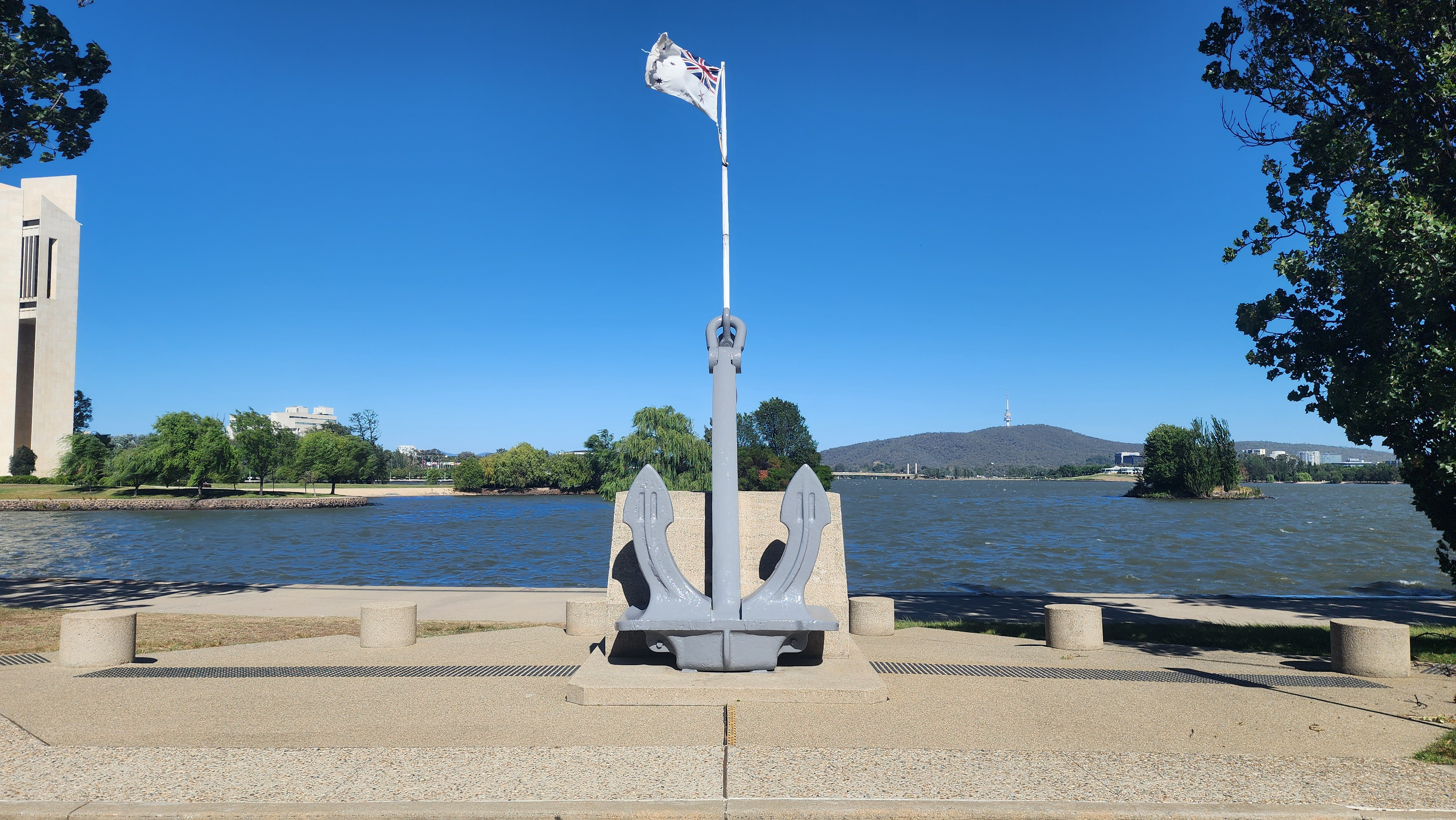
HMAS Canberra memorial on the east shore of Lake Burley Griffin

Canberra's wreck was rediscovered and examined by Robert Ballard and his crew in July and August 1992, almost exactly fifty years after her scuttling. She lies upright on the ocean floor, approximately 2,500 feet (760 m) below sea level, and while her hull was basically intact, she shows visible signs of shell hits and fire damage amidships. Just as they had been during the Battle of Savo Island, Canberra's "B", "X" and "Y" turrets were trained to port, while "A" turret was trained on the port bow. When the ship was rediscovered in 1992, the forward superstructure had collapsed over to the starboard side; the roof of "B" turret was missing.

=== Memorials ===
HMAS Canberra is remembered in various places. In her name city of Canberra, a memorial is located next to Lake Burley Griffin, adjacent to the National Carillon. It incorporates a naval anchor and a section of chain cable (of the same type carried by Canberra), and it has two plaques detailing the purpose of the memorial and the details of the cruiser. The memorial was erected by the Australian Capital Territory Branch of the Naval Historical Society, with donations from the ex-HMAS Canberra and Canberra-Shropshire Association members, and was unveiled on 9 August 1981 by Admiral Sir Anthony Synnot. A commemorative address was given at the unveiling by Admiral Sir Victor Smith, who was aboard Canberra at the time of her loss. Each year on the Saturday closest 9 August, a service is conducted at the memorial, which is attended by the Australian Chief of Navy, the defence attachés from the United States and the United Kingdom, and personnel from the naval base HMAS Harman. A catafalque party was originally provided by personnel from the frigate HMAS Canberra until the ship's 2005 decommissioning; after this, the catafalque party was supplied by the Australian Navy Cadets unit TS Canberra.

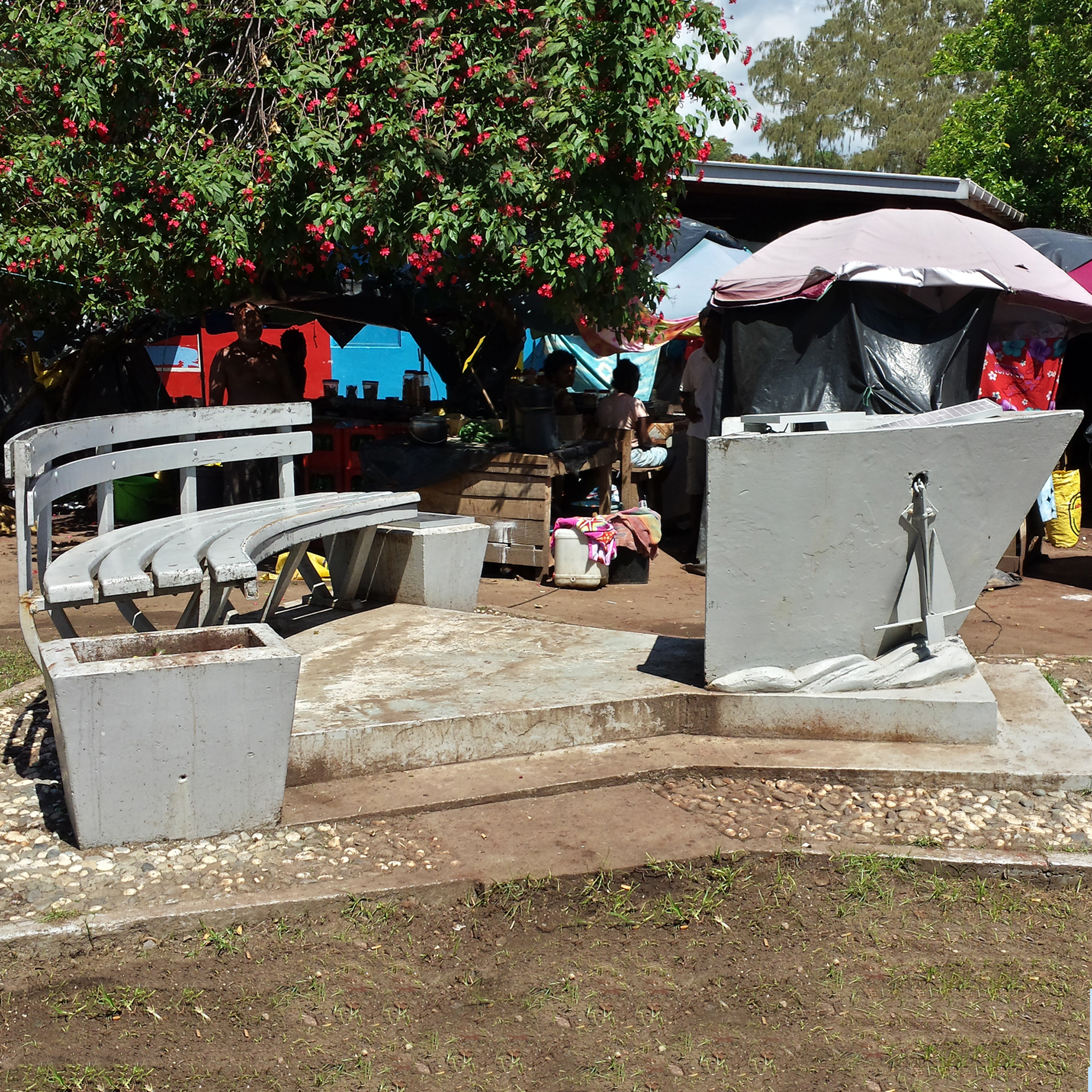
HMAS Canberra memorial in Rove, Honiara

Another memorial is located at the Police Memorial Park in Rove, Honiara, Solomon Islands. The memorial is shaped like the bow of a ship, and points toward Savo Island. A previous memorial to the ship, which had been located in the grounds of the Vilu Military Museum, was destroyed in 2000 during "the Tensions". A memorial plaque is also dedicated to HMAS Canberra and her Tasmanian RAN personnel at the Tasmanian Seafarers' Memorial at Triabunna on the east coast of Tasmania.

The ship's service is also recognised in a stained glass window at the Garden Island Naval Chapel.
