= Vilu Military Museum =

War museum in the Solomon Islands

Coordinates: 9°19′8.5″S 159°47′36″E

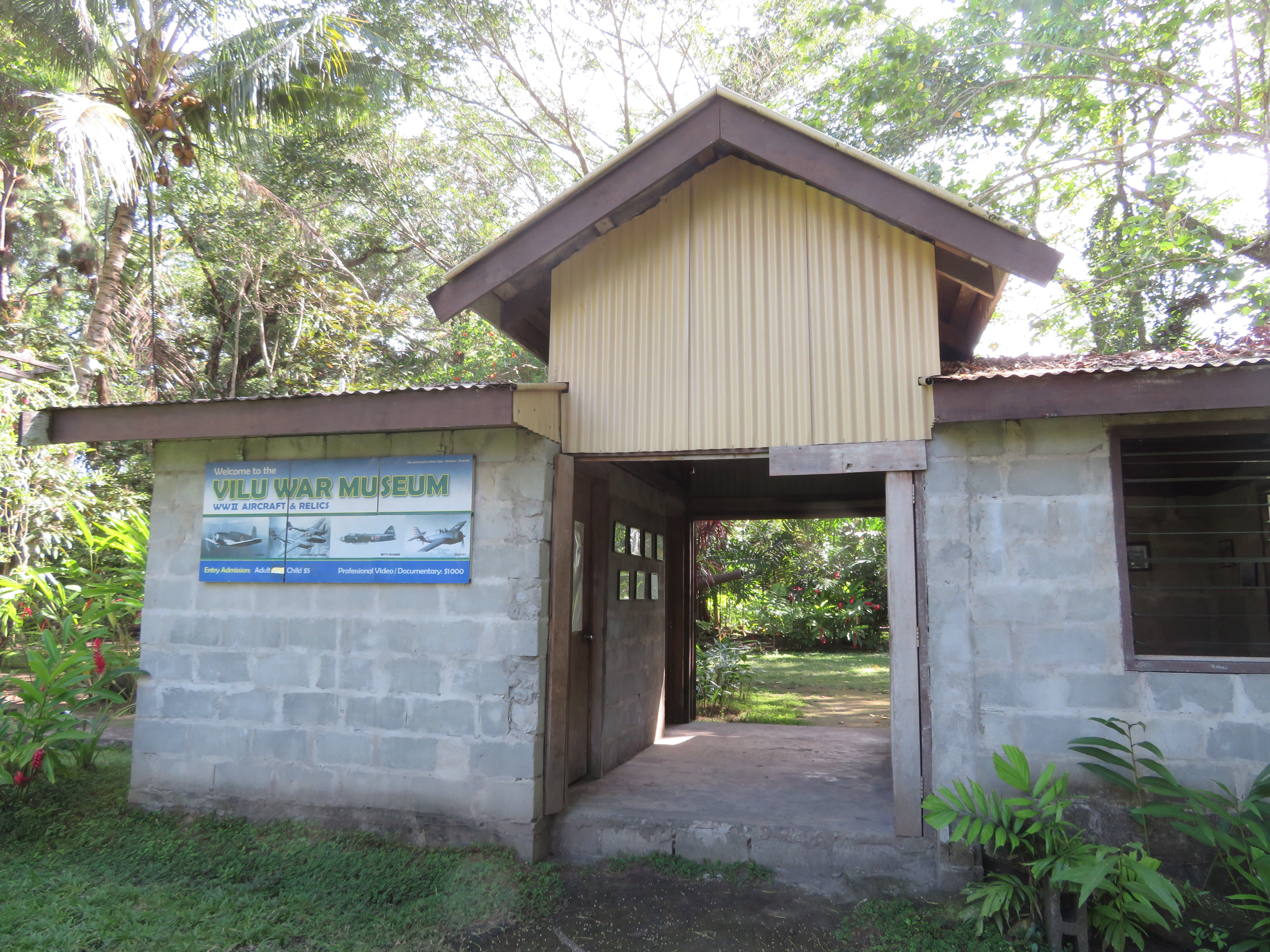
- Main entrance
- Established: 1975
- Location: Vilu, Guadacanal, Solomon Islands
- Type: Open-air war museum and war memorial

Vilu Military Museum, also known as the Vilu War Museum, is a small open air museum in Vilu, on the island of Guadalcanal in the Solomon Islands. The museum houses the remains of American and Japanese equipment left over from the Guadalcanal campaign during World War II.

== Description ==
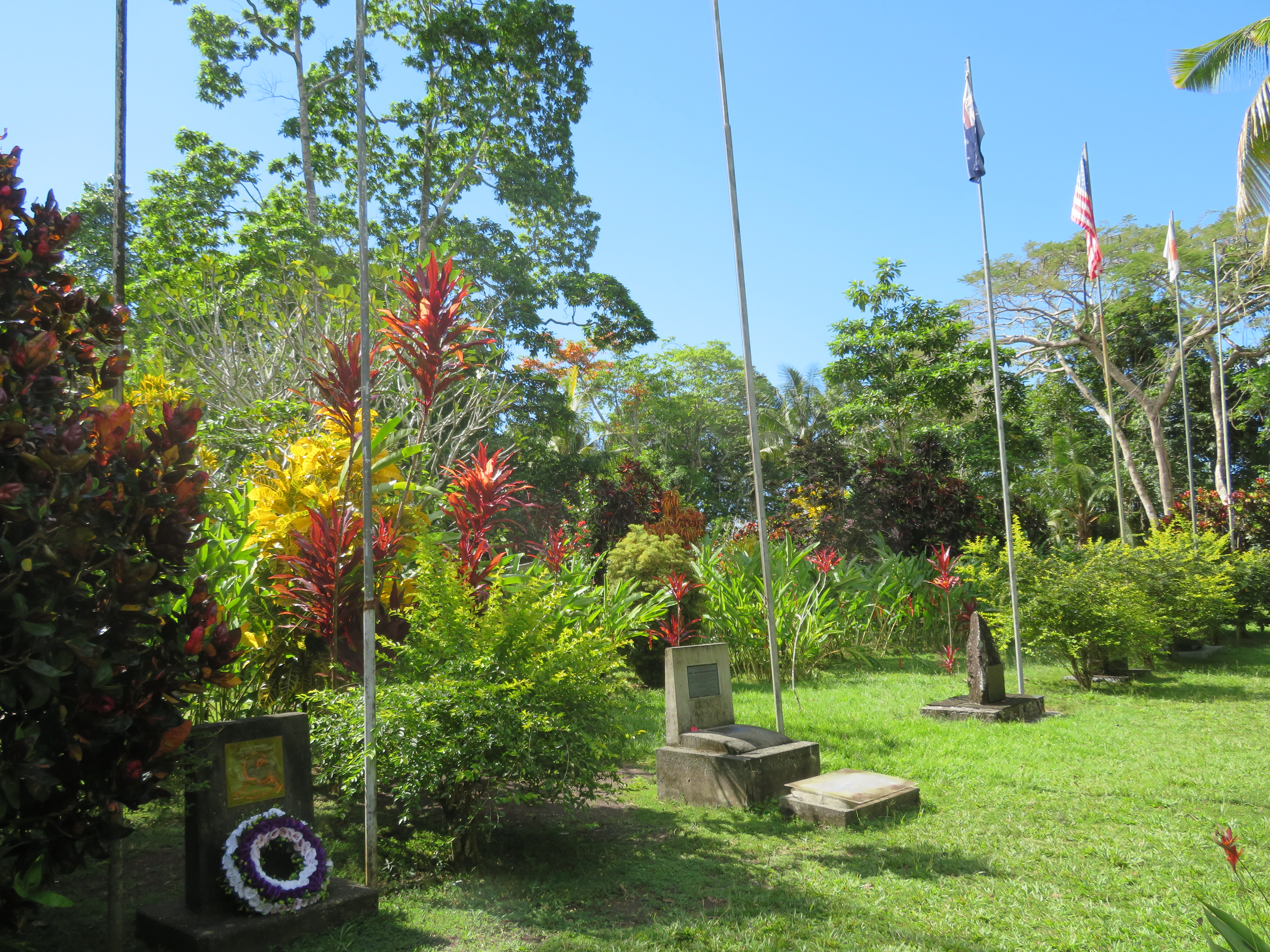
The memorial plaques in the museum

The museum was founded by Fred Kona in 1975, who operated the museum until his death in 1994, after which his family took over operations. The museum is open air and contains the remains of Japanese and American aircraft and artillery pieces destroyed during the Guadalcanal campaign of 1942–43, which saw several major battles take place on and around Guadalcanal. Some of the wrecks located in the museum were moved from other locations, and the museum also maintains a number of memorial plaques, including one for the Royal New Zealand Airforce and HMAS Canberra.

The museum was abandoned during a period of civil unrest on Guadalcanal, but later reclaimed. The museum is occasionally visited by American, Australian and Japanese tourists.

== Collection ==
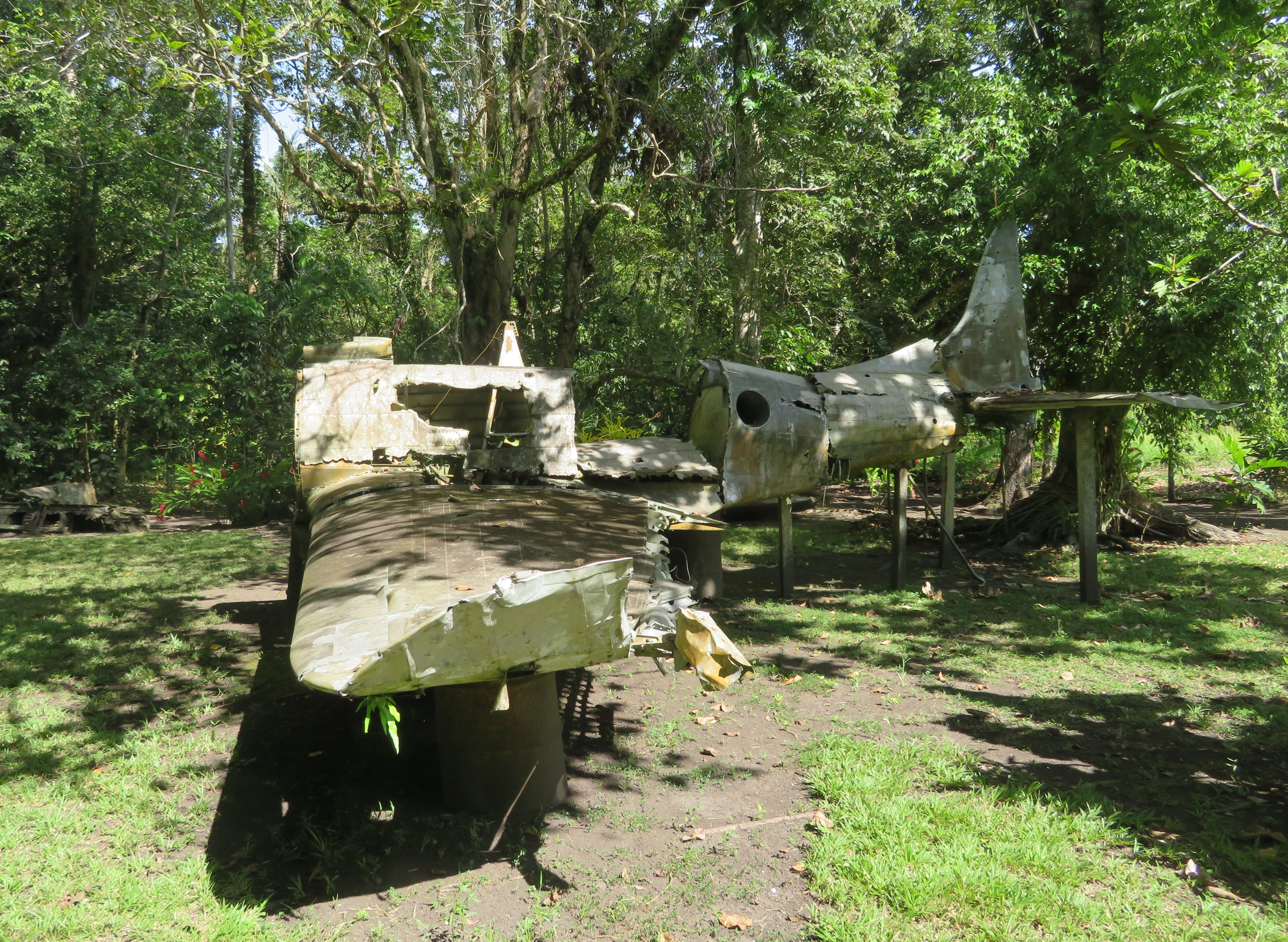
SBD Dauntless on display at the museum

=== Aircraft ===
- Grumman F4F-4 Wildcat BuNo 12068
- F4F Wildcat – Only the wing and tail section
- Vought F4U-1 Corsair
- Lockheed P-38F Lightning
- Bell P-39 Airacobra – Only the engine and propeller
- Douglas SBD Dauntless
- Grumman J2F-5 Duck BuNo 00791 – Only the wing and front section of the pontoon
- Mitsubishi G4M1 Model 11 Serial #1570 – Tail code 377. Only the nose section and parts of outer wing panel

=== Artillery piece ===
- Four Type 96 15 cm howitzer c/n 11, 104, 133 and 136
- Type 88 75 mm AA gun
- Turret of the Type 97 ShinHoTo Chi-Ha medium tank
