= USS Canberra (LCS-30) =

Littoral combat ship of the United States Navy

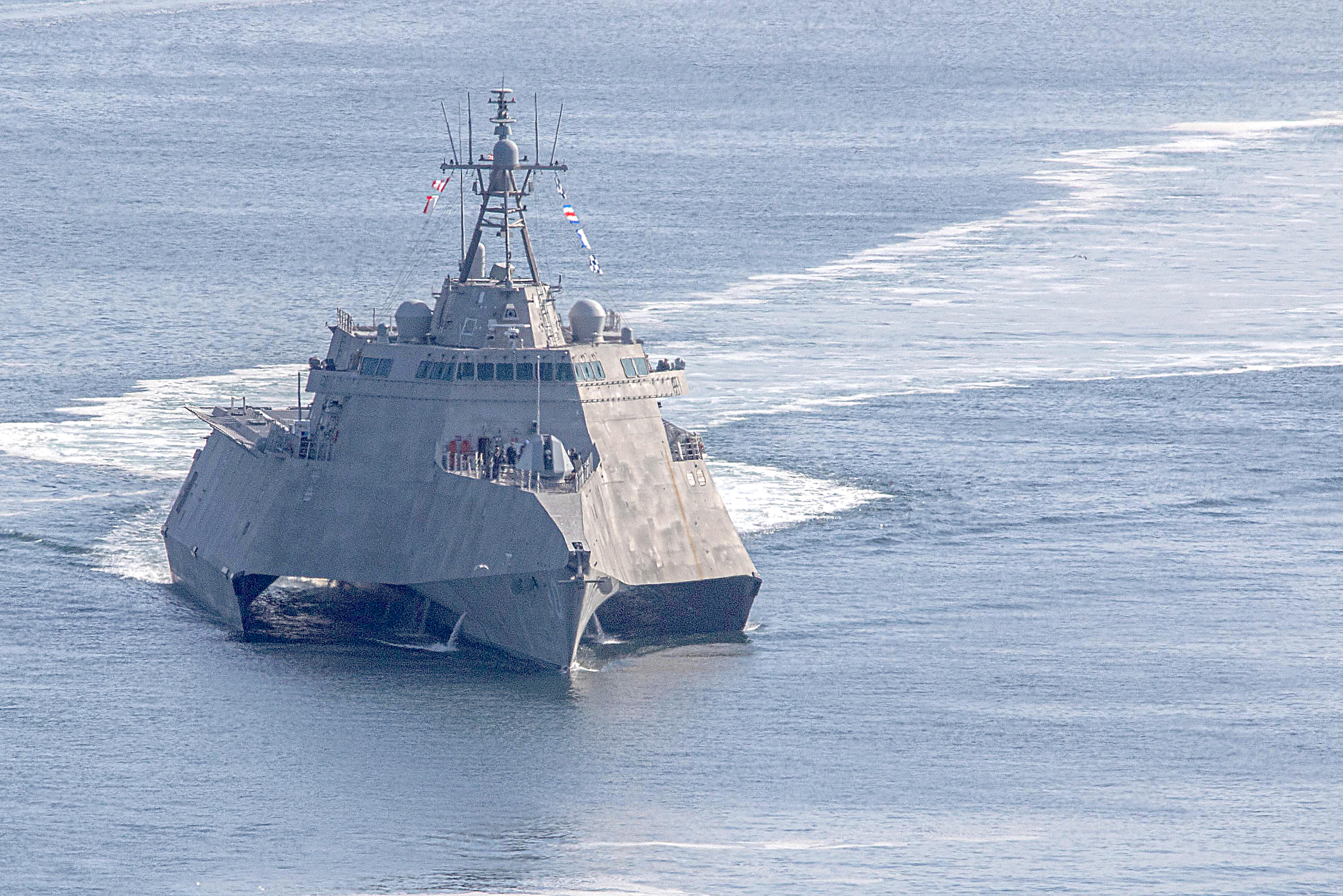
- USS Canberra (LCS-30) on 19 April 2023

History

United States
- Name: Canberra
- Namesake: HMAS Canberra
- Awarded: 6 October 2017
- Builder: Austal USA
- Laid down: 10 March 2020
- Launched: 30 March 2021
- Sponsored by: Marise Payne
- Christened: 5 June 2021
- Acquired: 21 December 2021
- Commissioned: 22 July 2023
- Home port: Bahrain
- Identification: Hull number: LCS-30
- Motto: Can Do!
- Status: in active service
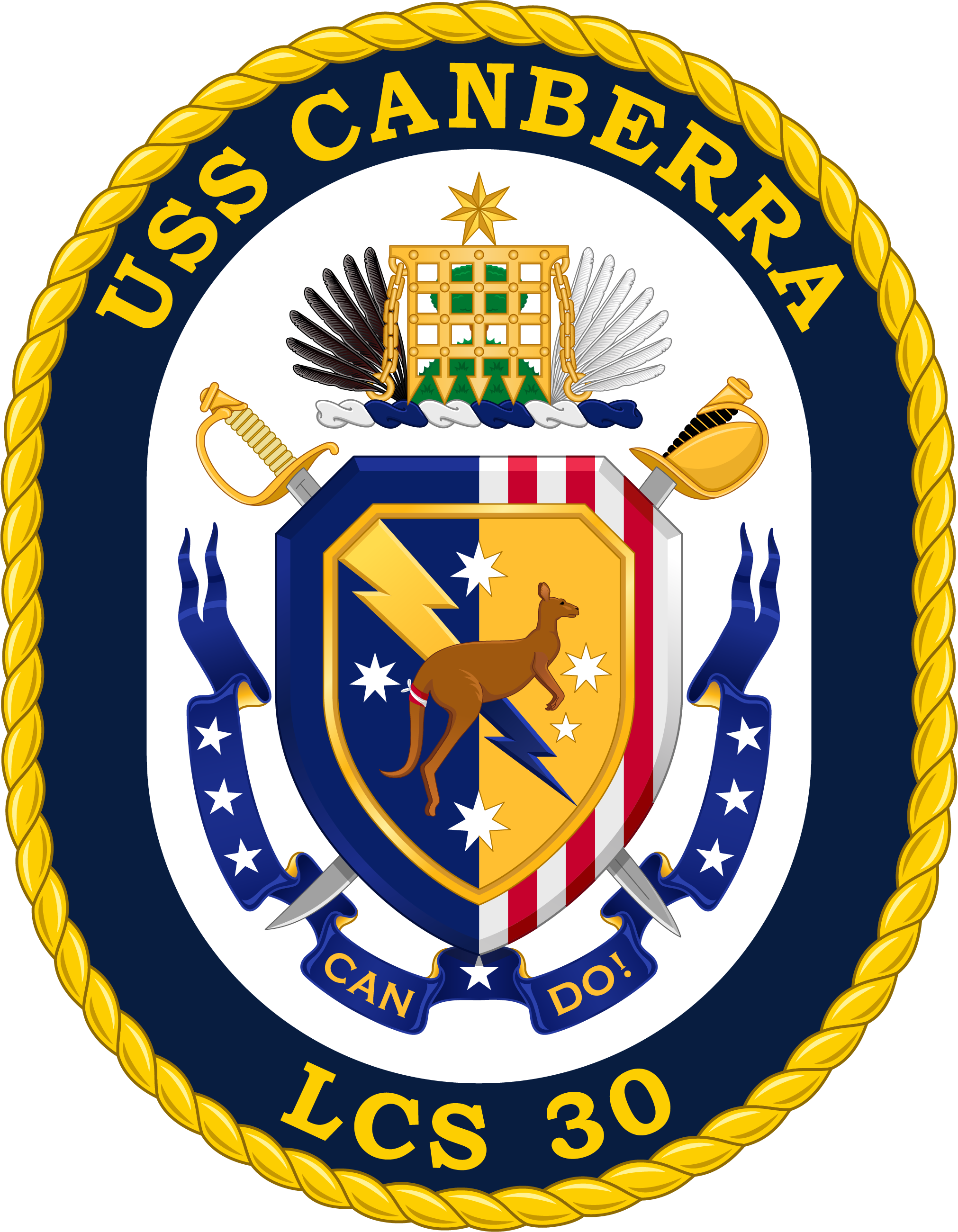
- Badge

General characteristics
- Class & type: Independence-class littoral combat ship
- Displacement: 2,307 metric tons light, 3,104 metric tons full, 797 metric tons deadweight
- Length: 127.4 m (418 ft)
- Beam: 31.6 m (104 ft)
- Draft: 14 ft (4.27 m)
- Propulsion: 2× General Electric LM2500 gas turbines, 2× diesel, 4× waterjets, retractable Azimuth thruster, 4× diesel generators
- Speed: 40 knots (74 km/h; 46 mph)+, 47 knots (54 mph; 87 km/h) sprint
- Range: 4,300 nautical miles (8,000 km; 4,900 mi) at 20 knots (37 km/h; 23 mph)+
- Capacity: 210 tonnes
- Complement: 40 core crew (8 officers, 32 enlisted) plus up to 35 mission crew
- Sensors & processing systems: Sea Giraffe 3D Surface/Air RADAR; Bridgemaster-E Navigational RADAR; AN/KAX-2 EO/IR sensor for GFC
- Electronic warfare & decoys: EDO ES-3601 ESM; 4× SRBOC rapid bloom chaff launchers
- Armament: BAE Systems Mk 110 57 mm gun; 4× .50 cal (12.7 mm) guns (2 aft, 2 forward); Evolved SeaRAM 11 cell missile launcher; Mission modules
- Aircraft carried: 2× MH-60R/S Seahawks

USS Canberra (LCS-30) is an Independence-class littoral combat ship of the United States Navy. She is the second US ship to be named Canberra, after the Australian cruiser HMAS Canberra, named after the Australian capital and sunk during the Battle of Savo Island.

== Construction and career ==
Canberra was built in Mobile, Alabama by Austal USA. She was christened on 5 June 2021, with Australian Minister of Foreign Affairs, Marise Payne, serving as the ship's sponsor. Arthur Sinodinos, Australia's Ambassador to the United States was in attendance at the ceremony on behalf of Australia.

The US Navy accepted delivery of the ship at Austal USA's facilities in Mobile on 21 December 2021. At this time she was scheduled to be commissioned in mid-2022. On 22 June 2022 Canberra arrived at her home port of San Diego Naval Base.

Canberra was commissioned on 22 July 2023 at the Royal Australian Navy's Fleet Base East in Sydney, Australia. It was the first commissioning ceremony for a US Navy warship held in Australia. The following day, the crew of USS Canberra alongside the crew of HMAS Canberra exercised a ceremonial Freedom of Entry to the city of Canberra. (see gallery)

The littoral combat ship USS Canberra (LCS 30) arrived at Naval Support Activity Bahrain, May 22, 2025, the first of four of the class expected to be deployed in the region. During Operation Epic Fury, Canberra was deployed in the fifth fleet in support of the U.S Naval blockade.

== Gallery ==
=== 2023 Freedom of Entry - Canberra, Australian Capital Territory (23 July 2023) ===
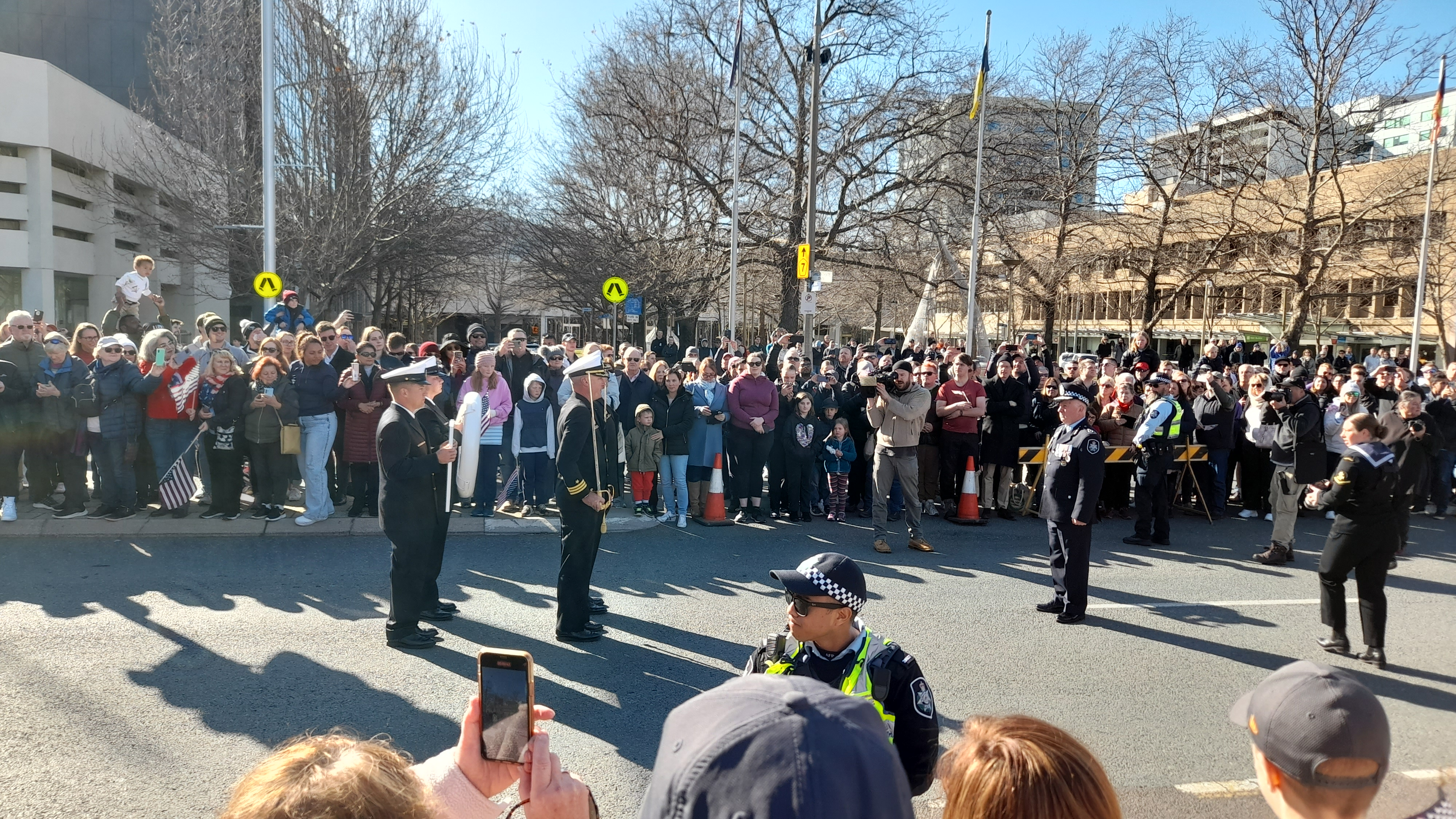
Challenge by ACT Chief Police Officer

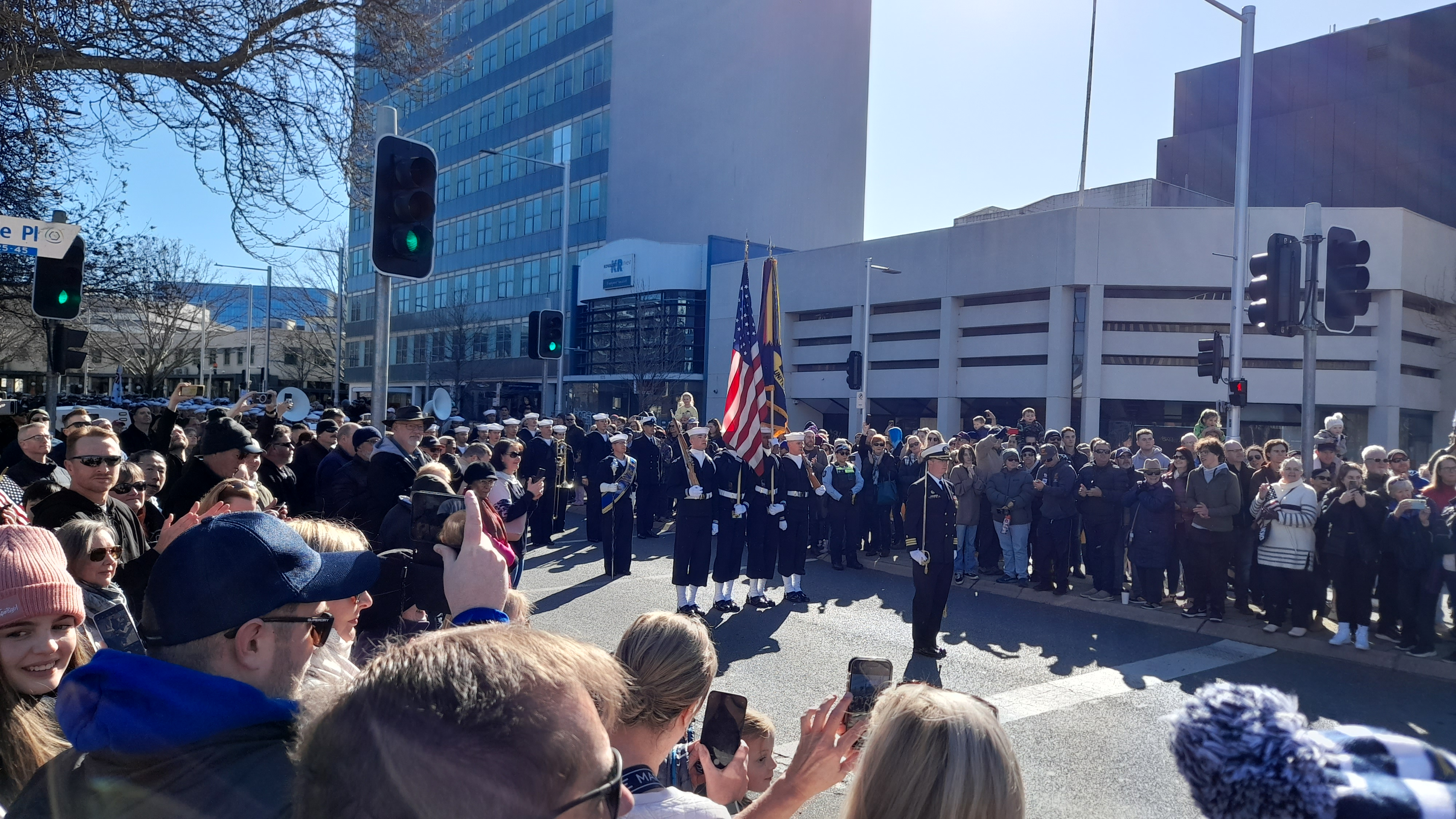
Color Party

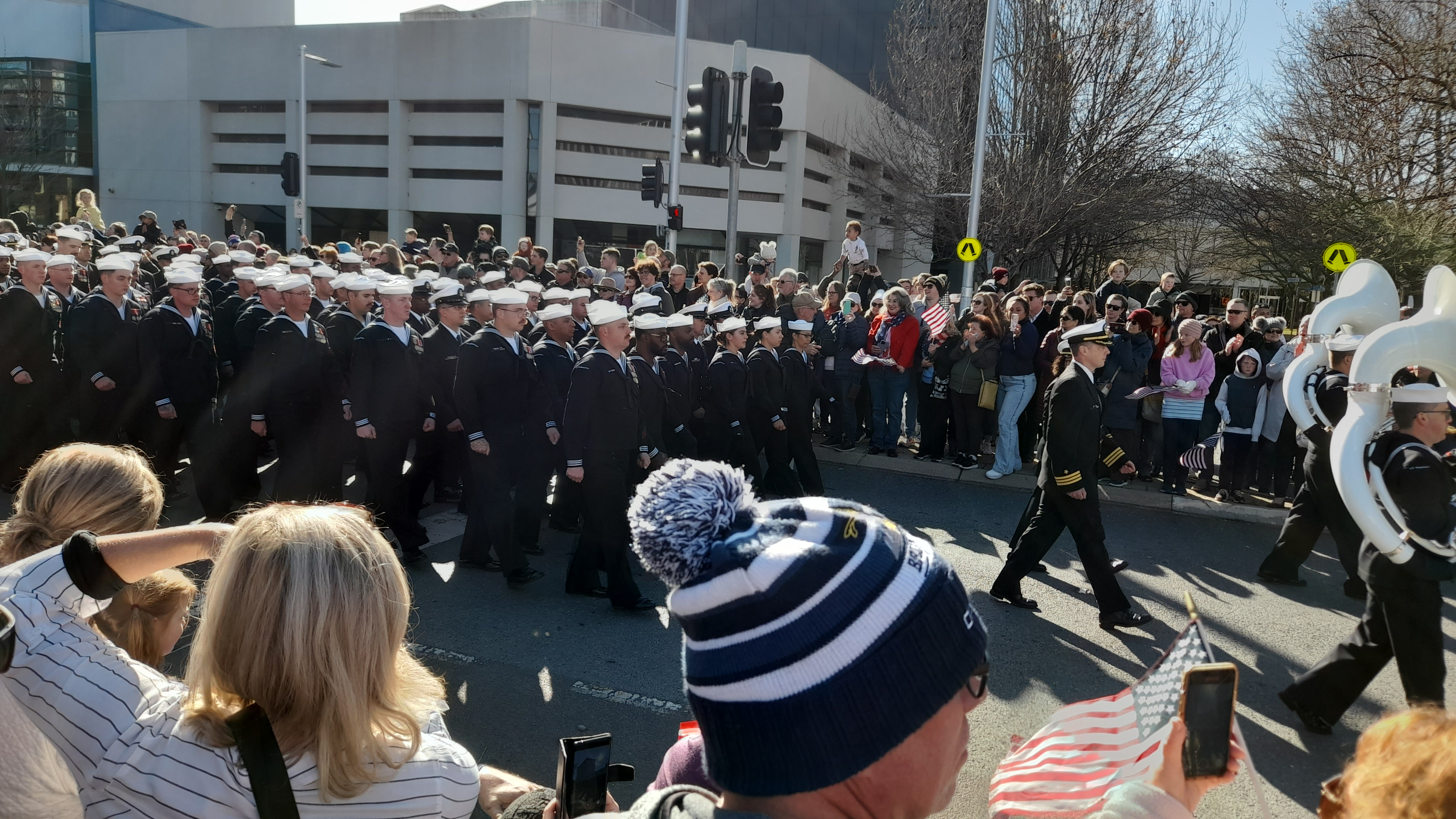
Crew marching

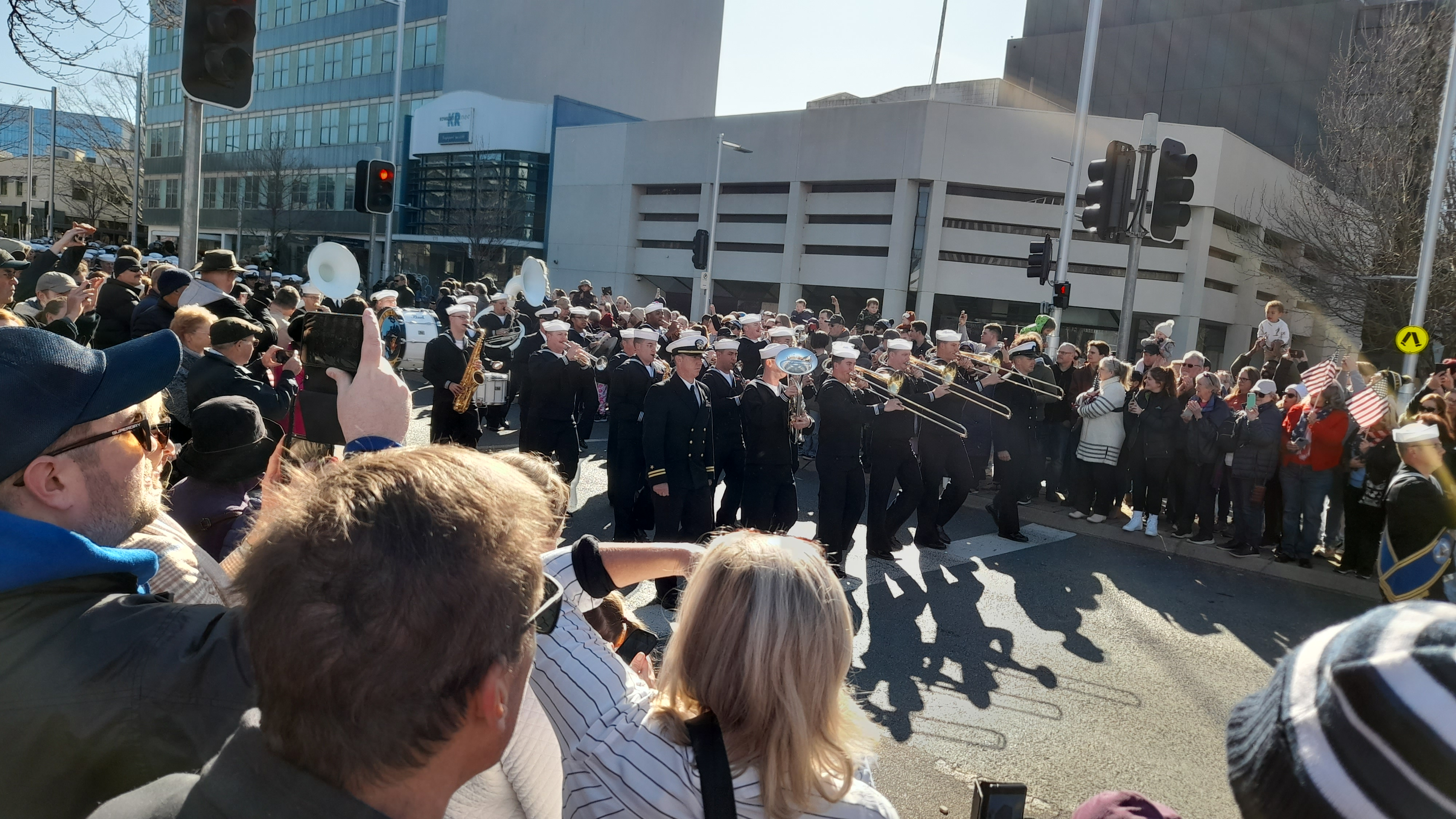
United States Seventh Fleet Band

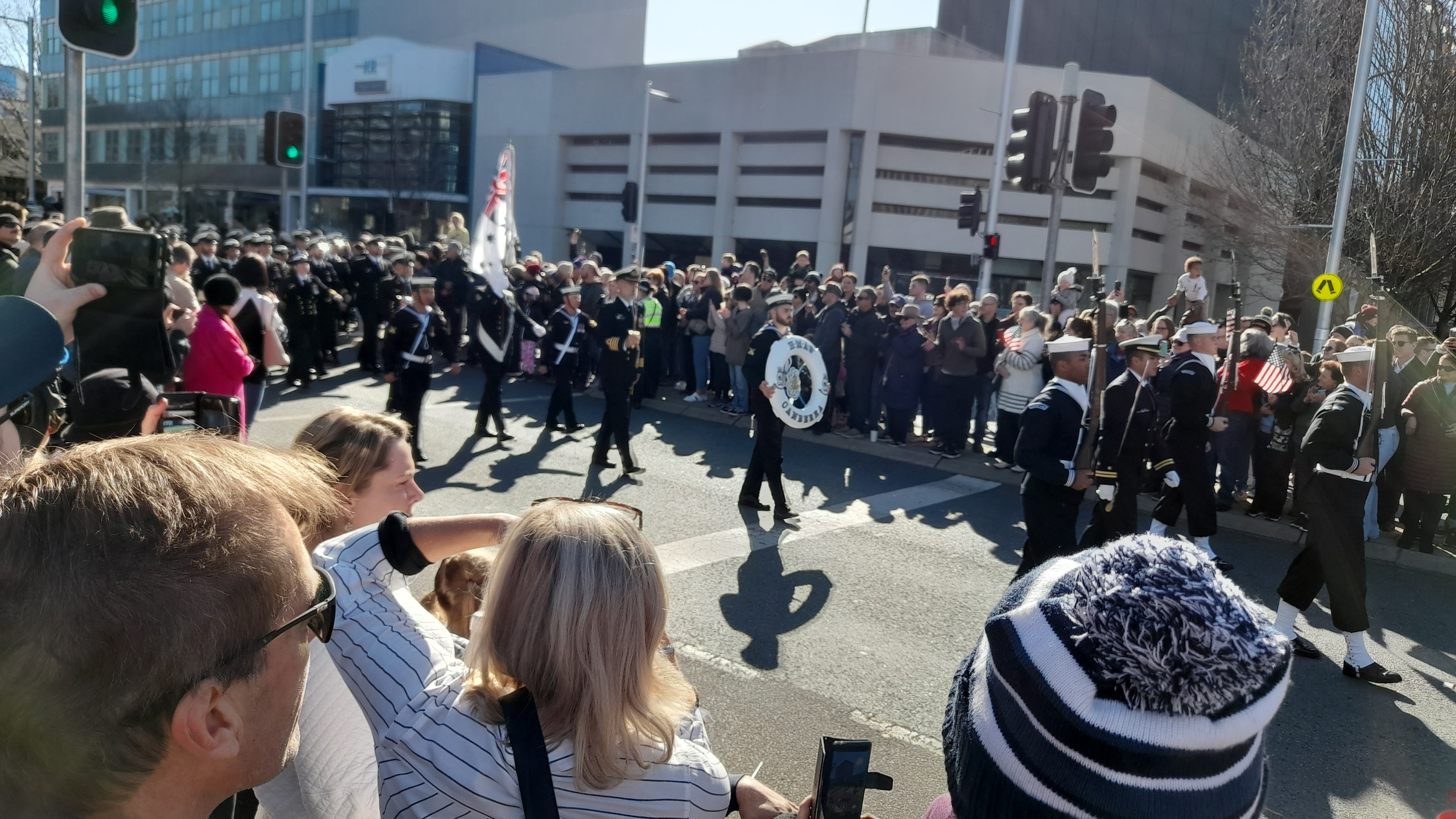
HMAS Canberra (L02) contingent
