= HMAS Canberra (FFG 02) =

Guided missile frigate

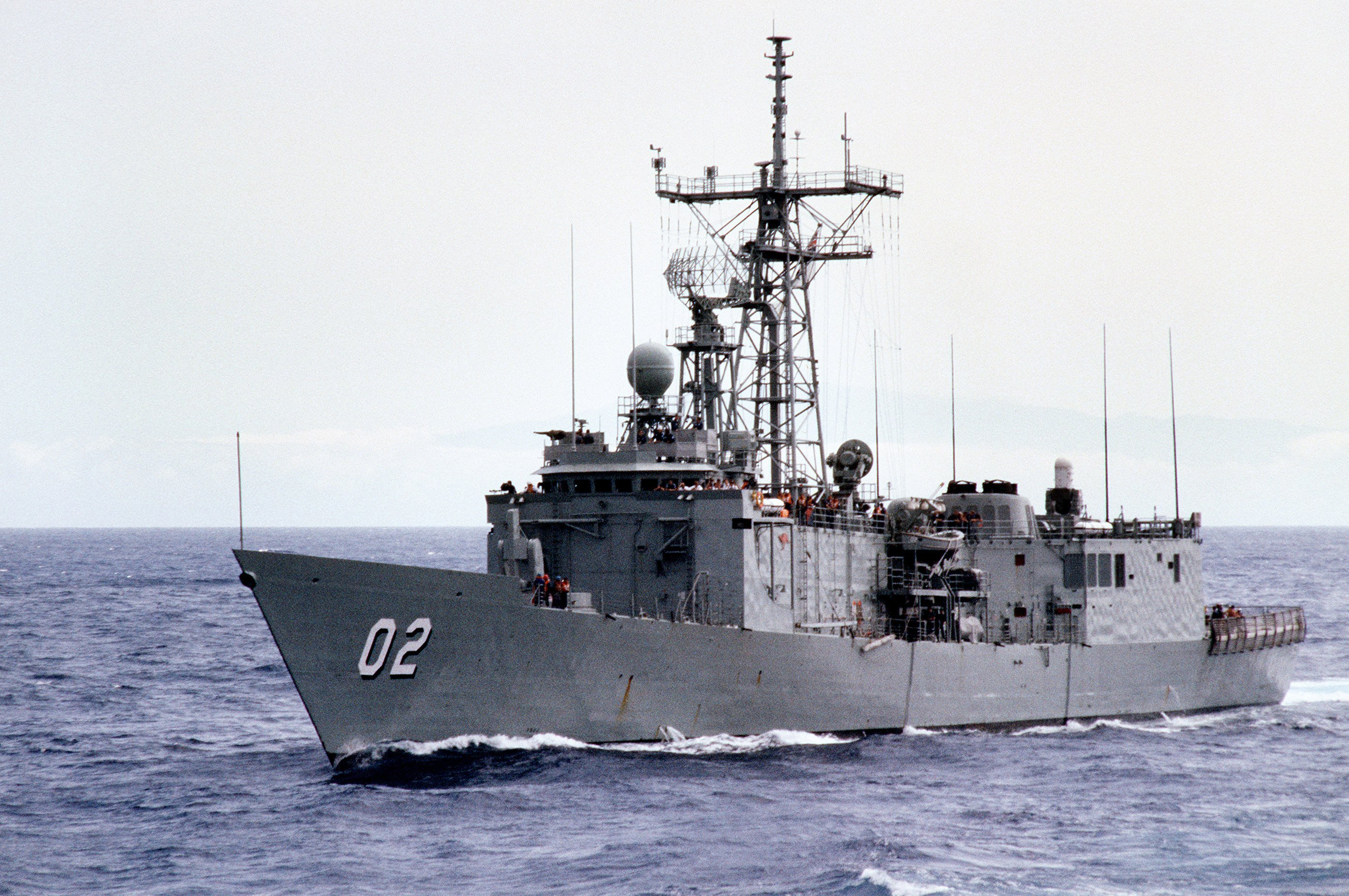
- HMAS Canberra in 1988

History

Australia
- Namesake: City of Canberra
- Builder: Todd Pacific Shipyards, Seattle, Washington
- Laid down: 1 March 1978
- Launched: 1 December 1978
- Commissioned: 21 March 1981
- Decommissioned: 12 November 2005
- Motto: "For Queen And Country"
- Nickname(s): FFG-18 (US hull designation during construction)
- Honours and awards: Battle honours: Persian Gulf 2002; plus four inherited battle honours
- Fate: Sunk as dive wreck 4 October 2009

General characteristics
- Class & type: Adelaide-class guided missile frigate
- Displacement: 4,100 tons
- Length: 138.1 m (453 ft) overall
- Beam: 13.7 m (45 ft)
- Draught: 7.5 m (25 ft)
- Propulsion: 2 × General Electric LM2500 gas turbines, 41,000 horsepower (31,000 kW), 1 shaft; 2 × 650-horsepower (480 kW) auxiliary propulsors
- Speed: 29 knots (54 km/h; 33 mph)
- Range: 4,500 nautical miles (8,300 km; 5,200 mi) at 20 knots (37 km/h; 23 mph)
- Complement: 184 (including 15 officers, not including aircrew)
- Sensors & processing systems: AN/SPS-49 air search radar; AN/SPS-55 surface search and navigation radar; SPG-60 fire control radar (Mark 92 fire control system); AN/SQS-56 hull-mounted sonar
- Armament: 1 × Mark 13 Missile Launcher for Harpoon and Standard missiles; 2 × Mark 32 torpedo tubes; 1 × OTO Melara 76 mm naval gun; 1 × 20 mm Phalanx CIWS; Up to 6 x 12.7-millimetre (0.50 in) machine guns; 2 × M2HB .50 calibre Mini Typhoons (fitted as required)
- Aircraft carried: 2 × S-70B Seahawk or 1 × Seahawk and 1 × AS350B Squirrel

HMAS Canberra (FFG 02) was an Adelaide class guided missile frigate of the Royal Australian Navy (RAN). Based on the Oliver Hazard Perry class design, Canberra was one of four Adelaide class ships constructed in the United States of America, and one of six to serve in the RAN.

The frigate entered service in 1981. During her career, Canberra was assigned to escort the Royal Yacht Britannia during Queen Elizabeth II's visit in 1988, helped enforce the post-Gulf War United Nations' sanctions against Iraq during 1992 and 1993, was part of the Australian responses to the 1998 Indonesian riots and the 2000 Solomon Islands Civil War, and returned to the Persian Gulf in 2002 as part of the War in Afghanistan.

In 2005, Canberra became the first ship of her class to be decommissioned. The frigate was marked for conversion into a dive wreck and artificial reef off Barwon Heads, Victoria, and was scuttled on 4 October 2009.

== Design and construction ==
Following the cancellation of the Australian light destroyer project in 1973, the British Type 42 destroyer and the American Oliver Hazard Perry-class frigate were identified as alternatives to replace the cancelled light destroyers and the Daring-class destroyers. Although the Oliver Hazard Perry class was still at the design stage, the difficulty of fitting the Type 42 with the SM-1 missile, and the success of the Perth-class acquisition (a derivative of the American Charles F. Adams-class destroyer) compared to equivalent British designs led the Australian government to approve the purchase of two US-built Oliver Hazard Perry-class frigates (including Canberra) in 1976. A third was ordered in 1977, followed by a fourth, with all four ships integrated into the USN's shipbuilding program. A further two ships were ordered in 1980, and were constructed in Australia.

As designed, the ship had a full load displacement of 3,605 tons, a length overall of 135.6 metres (445 ft), a beam of 13.7 metres (45 ft), and a draught of 24.5 metres (80 ft). Starting in December 1991, Canberra was modified from the Oliver Hazard Perry FLIGHT II design to FLIGHT III, requiring a lengthening of the helicopter deck for the RAST helicopter recovery system, increasing displacement to 4,100 tons and pushing the overall length to 138.1 metres (453 ft). Propulsion machinery consists of two General Electric LM2500 gas turbines, which provide a combined 41,000 horsepower (31,000 kW) to the single propeller shaft. Top speed is 29 knots (54 km/h; 33 mph), with a range of 4,500 nautical miles (8,300 km; 5,200 mi) at 20 knots (37 km/h; 23 mph). Two 650-horsepower (480 kW) electric auxiliary propulsors are used for close manoeuvring, with a top speed of 4 knots (7.4 km/h; 4.6 mph). Standard ship's company is 184, including 15 officers, but excluding the flight crew for the embarked helicopters.

Original armament for the ship consisted of a Mark 13 missile launcher configured to fire RIM-66 Standard and RGM-84 Harpoon missiles, supplemented by an OTO Melara 76-millimetre (3.0 in) gun and a Vulcan Phalanx point-defence system. For anti-submarine warfare, two Mark 32 torpedo tube sets are fitted; originally firing the Mark 44 torpedo, the Adelaides later carried the Mark 46 torpedoes. Up to six 12.7-millimetre (0.50 in) machine guns can be carried for close-in defence, and since 2005, two M2HB .50 calibre machine guns in Mini Typhoon mounts have been installed when needed for Persian Gulf deployments. The sensor suite includes an AN/SPS-49 air search radar, AN/SPS-55 surface search and navigation radar, SPG-60 fire control radar connected to a Mark 92 fire control system, and an AN/SQS-56 hull-mounted sonar. Two helicopters can be embarked: either two S-70B Seahawk or one Seahawk and one AS350B Squirrel.

Canberra was laid down as the first ship of the Perry class's Flight II design by Todd Pacific Shipyards at Seattle, Washington on 1 March 1978, and launched on 1 December 1978. Canberra was commissioned into the RAN on 21 March 1981. The ship received the United States Navy hull number FFG-18 during construction.

=== Armament ===
Canberra's main weapon was the Mark 13 missile launcher located on the foredeck: this is used to fire both Harpoon and SM-2MR Standard missiles. A 76-millimetre (3.0 in) Mark 75 OTO Melara gun is located on top of the superstructure, in front of the exhaust funnel. A triple-barrelled Mark 32 torpedo tube set is fitted to each side of the superstructure. For close defence, a 20-millimetre (0.79 in) Mark 16 Mod 2 Phalanx CIWS sits at the aft end of the superstructure, above the frigate's two helicopter hangars.

The hangars housed two S-70B Seahawk helicopters.

== Operational history ==
After commissioning, Canberra and Adelaide remained in the United States to work up; during this time both ships were attached to the United States Navy's Destroyer Squadron 9.

Canberra was assigned as escort to the Royal Yacht Britannia during Queen Elizabeth II's visit to Australia during April and May 1988, as part of the Australian Bicentennary celebrations.

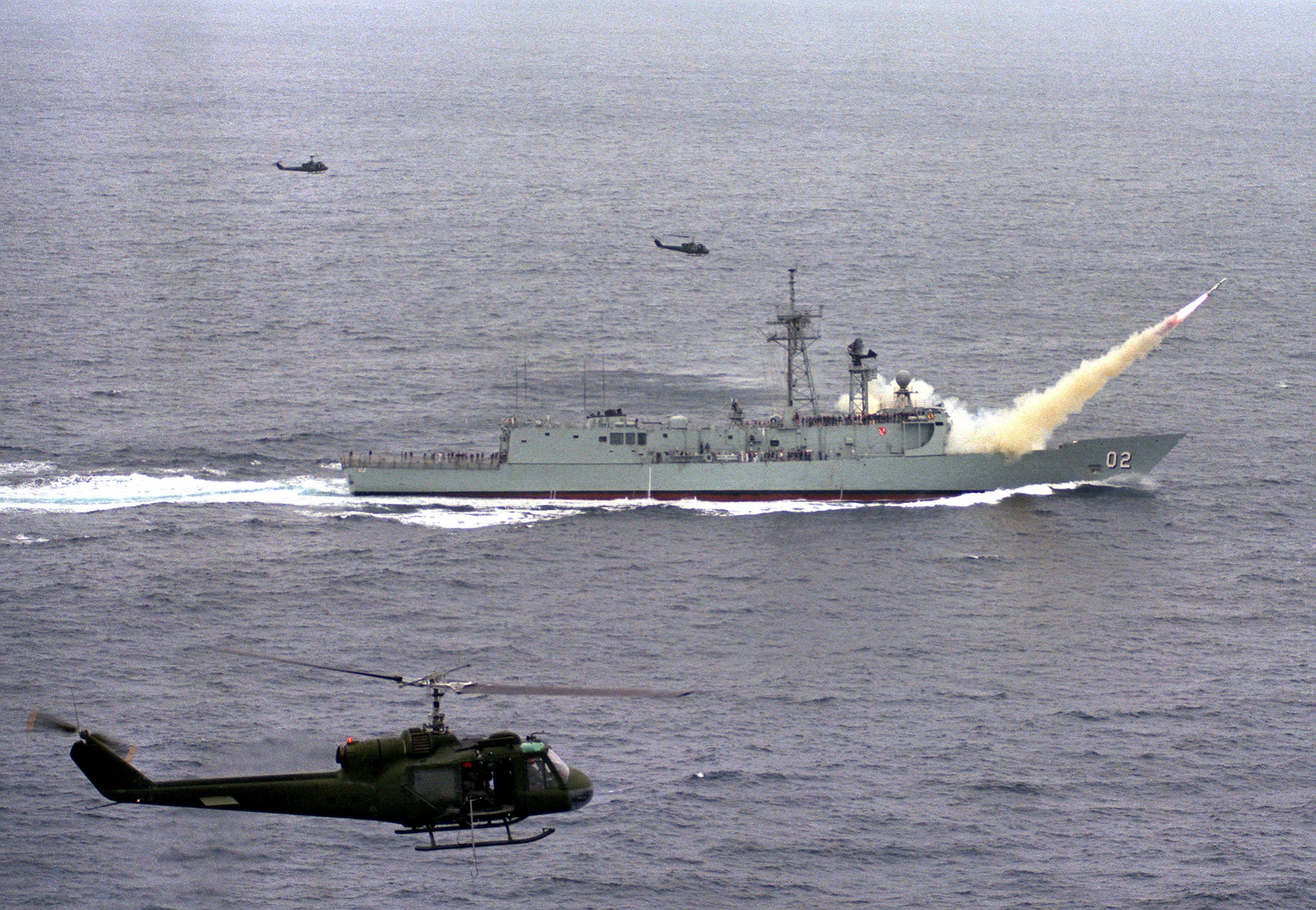
Canberra launching a Harpoon

On 16 May 1990, Canberra was one of six Australian warships, and one of 64 naval vessels from 21 nations present at the Royal Fleet Review marking the 55th anniversary of the Royal Malaysian Navy.

Canberra was deployed to the Red Sea from 13 November 1992 to 12 March 1993 following the Gulf War, as part of the enforcement of the United Nations' sanctions against Iraq.

In December 1993, Canberra and the destroyer HMAS Perth visited Langkawi, Malaysia, for the Langkawi International Maritime and Aerospace Exhibition. During this assignment, ship's divers from Canberra assisted the Royal Malaysian Police in searching for and recovering the body of a merchant sailor who had fallen overboard from MV Leisureworld. Following this, the two ships sailed for New Zealand, and were present in the Bay of Islands for Waitangi Day, which commemorates the signing of the Treaty of Waitangi there on 6 February 1840, which brought New Zealand into the British Empire.

The frigate's home base was changed from Fleet Base East in New South Wales to Fleet Base West in Western Australia in February 1996.

On 17 May 1998, the frigate was one of four RAN ships placed on standby to help evacuate Australian citizens from Indonesia following riots. Canberra made at least one evacuation before the force was instructed to stand down a week later.

Following the conclusion of the Solomon Islands Civil War in 2000, Canberra was the last Australian warship sent to the Solomons to support the International Peace Monitoring Team; arriving on 13 September 2001, and remaining on station until 24 October.

After returning to Australia for Christmas and the New Year, the frigate accompanied the replenishment oiler HMAS Westralia to Heard Island and McDonald Islands in January 2002, where the two ships spent a month enforcing Australian sovereign rights and fisheries laws in the islands' Exclusive Economic Zone. During this deployment, on 7 February, the ship captured the Russian fishing vessel Volga, which was illegally operating around Heard Island. Later in the year, Canberra joined sister ship Newcastle and the amphibious warfare ship Manoora on a three-month deployment to the Persian Gulf in support of the International Coalition Against Terrorism.

In July 2003, while operating in northern Australian waters, Canberra intercepted Suspected Illegal Entry Vessel (SIEV) 13, the first SIEV to be intercepted since December 2001.

Canberra was decommissioned at Fleet Base West in Western Australia on 12 November 2005.

== Dive wreck ==
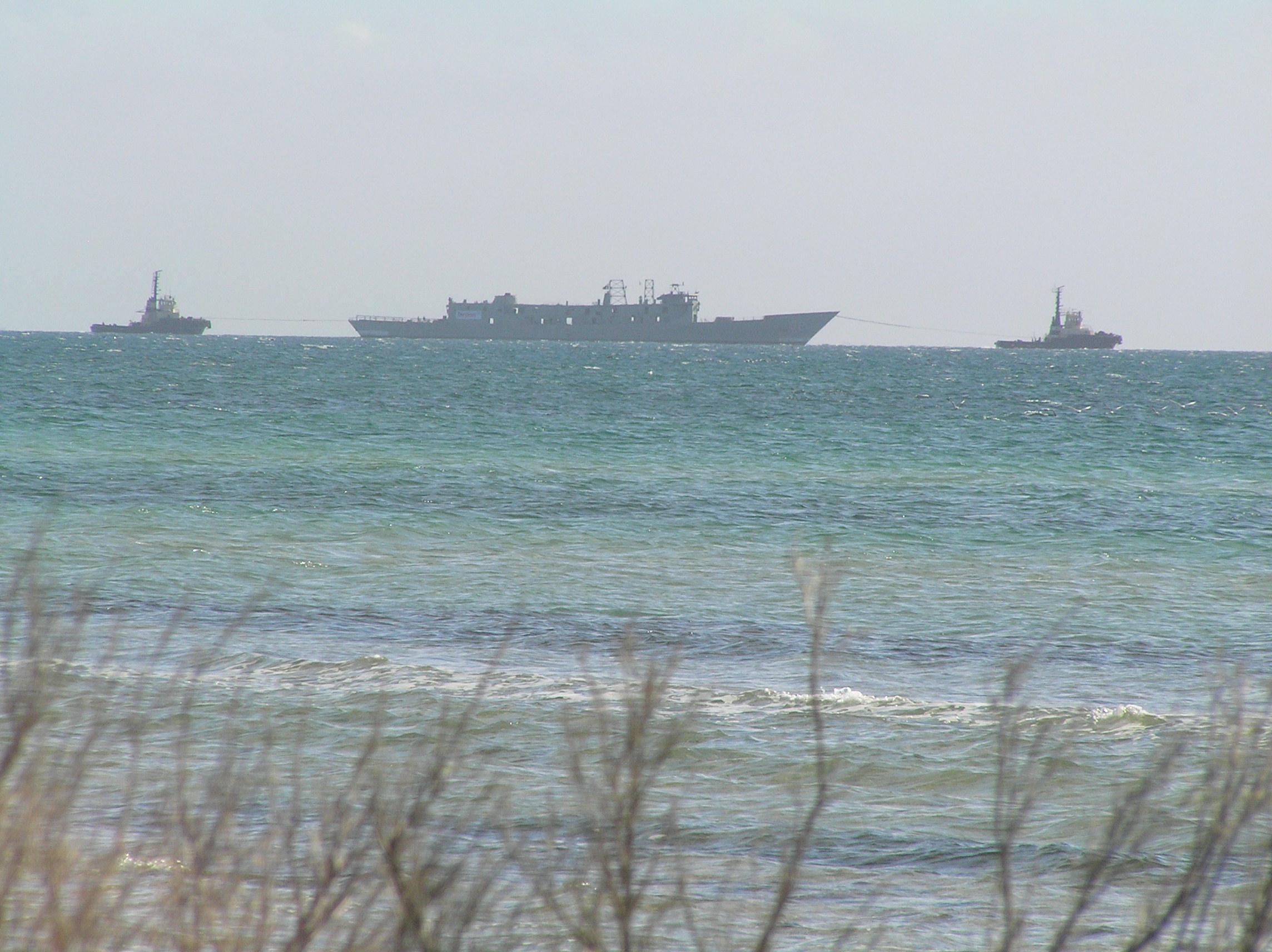
Canberra under tow to the scuttling site

In October 2006, it was announced that the decommissioned frigate would be scuttled off the coast of Barwon Heads, Victoria as a wreck diving site. In October 2006, the Federal Government allocated A$2.8 million to the project, while the Victorian Government allocated A$500,000. On 23 July 2007, the Minister for Defence, Brendan Nelson, announced that in order to ensure the quickest possible schedule for the sinking of the ship, A$7 million of federal money would be allocated to the project.

The frigate was scheduled to be scuttled in 30 metres (98 ft) of water, 2 nautical miles (3.7 km) off Ocean Grove, Victoria on 13 September 2009, but this was postponed until 4 October because of foul weather. Sixteen scuttling charges were detonated at 1400 hours, following a six-hour delay in towing the ship into position. Canberra was inspected the next day by civilian clearance divers to ensure she had settled safely. The wreck was opened to the public as a dive site on 5 December, after four mooring pylons for dive boats were installed and safety checks and remedial work were carried out. In early 2011, Parks Victoria posted a warning that the port side of the hangar had separated from the rest of the superstructure, with frames and plating shifting up to 150 millimetres (5.9 in). In mid-2011, Parks Victoria closed the dive site due to safety concerns following further degradation of the frigate. After assessment, the site was reopened on 24 October 2011.

As part of an overhaul of the RAN battle honours system, completed in March 2010, Canberra was retroactively awarded the battle honour "Persian Gulf 2002" for her service during the war in Afghanistan.
