= HMAS Adelaide (L01) =

Landing helicopter dock (ship) of the Royal Australian Navy (launched 2012)

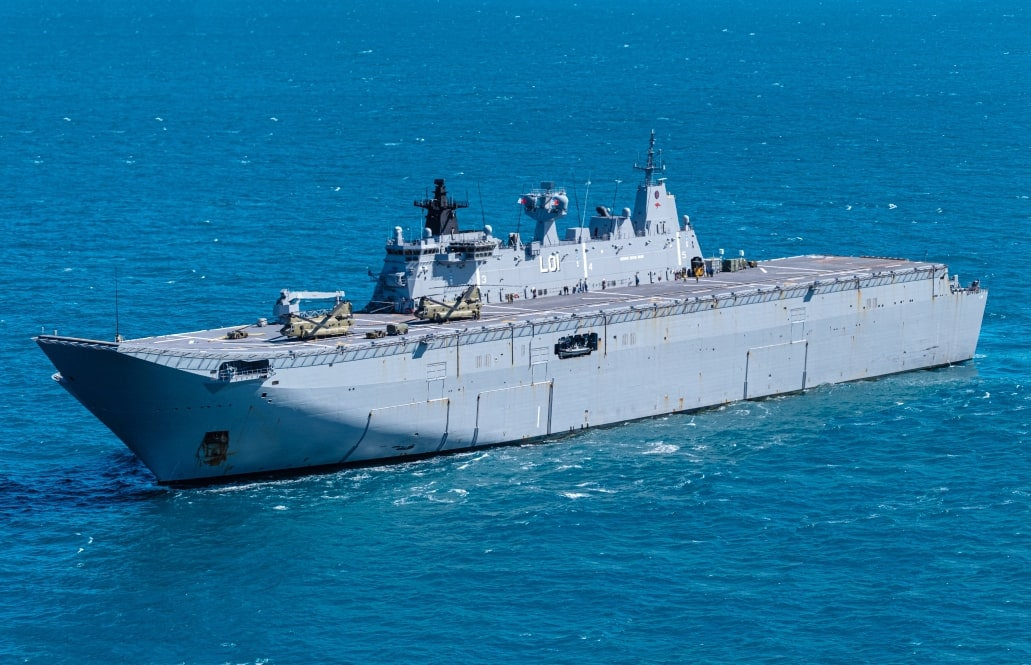
- Adelaide (L01) off the coast of Queensland

History

Australia
- Namesake: City of Adelaide
- Builder: Navantia, Ferrol, Spain & BAE Systems Australia, Williamstown Dockyard, Australia
- Laid down: 18 February 2011
- Launched: 4 July 2012
- Commissioned: 4 December 2015
- Home port: Fleet Base East
- Identification: IMO number: 9608972; MMSI number: 503000021; Callsign: VHJY
- Motto: United for the common good
- Honours and awards: Battle honours: four inherited battle honours
- Status: Active
- Badge

General characteristics
- Class & type: Canberra-class Landing Helicopter Dock
- Displacement: 27,500 tonnes (30,300 short tons; 27,100 long tons) at full load
- Length: 230.82 m (757.3 ft)
- Beam: 32.0 m (105.0 ft)
- Draft: 7.08 m (23.2 ft)
- Propulsion: Combined Diesel and Gas; 1 × GE LM2500 gas turbine; 2 × Navantia MAN 16V32/40 diesel generators; 2 × Navantia Siemens azimuth thrusters
- Speed: Over 20 knots (37 km/h; 23 mph) maximum; 19 knots (35 km/h; 22 mph) full-load sustained; 15 knots (28 km/h; 17 mph) economical
- Range: 9,000 nautical miles (17,000 km; 10,000 mi) at 15 knots (28 km/h; 17 mph)
- Boats & landing craft carried: 4 × LLC
- Capacity: Up to 110 vehicles; Heavy vehicle deck: 1,410 m^{2} (15,200 sq ft); Light vehicle deck: 1,880 m^{2} (20,200 sq ft)
- Troops: 1,046
- Complement: 358 personnel; 293 RAN, 62 Australian Army, 3 RAAF
- Sensors & processing systems: Giraffe AMB radar, Saab 9LV combat system
- Electronic warfare & decoys: AN/SLQ-25C Nixie towed torpedo decoy; Nulka missile decoy
- Armament: 4 × Rafael Typhoon 25 mm remote weapons systems; 6 × 12.7 mm machine guns
- Aircraft carried: 8 helicopters (standard); 18 helicopters (maximum hangar space)
- Aviation facilities: Flight deck with 13 degree ski-jump, 6 in-line deck landing spots

HMAS Adelaide (L01) is the second ship of the Canberra-class landing helicopter docks (LHD). Construction of the ship started at Navantia's Spanish shipyard, with steel-cutting in February 2010. The ship was laid down in February 2011, and launched on 4 July 2012. Delivery to Australia for fitting out at BAE Systems Australia's facilities in Victoria was scheduled for 2013, but did not occur until early 2014. Despite construction delays and predictions, the ship was commissioned in December 2015.

== Design ==
The Canberra-class design is based on the warship Juan Carlos I, built by Navantia for the Spanish Navy. The contract was awarded to Navantia and Australian company Tenix Defence following a request for tender which ran from February 2004 to June 2007, beating the enlarged Mistral-class design offered by the French company Direction des Constructions Navales. Adelaide has the same physical dimensions as Juan Carlos I, but differs in the design of the island superstructure and the internal layout, in order to meet Australian conditions and requirements. Unlike the Spanish vessel, the Australian ships are built to meet Lloyd's Naval Rules.

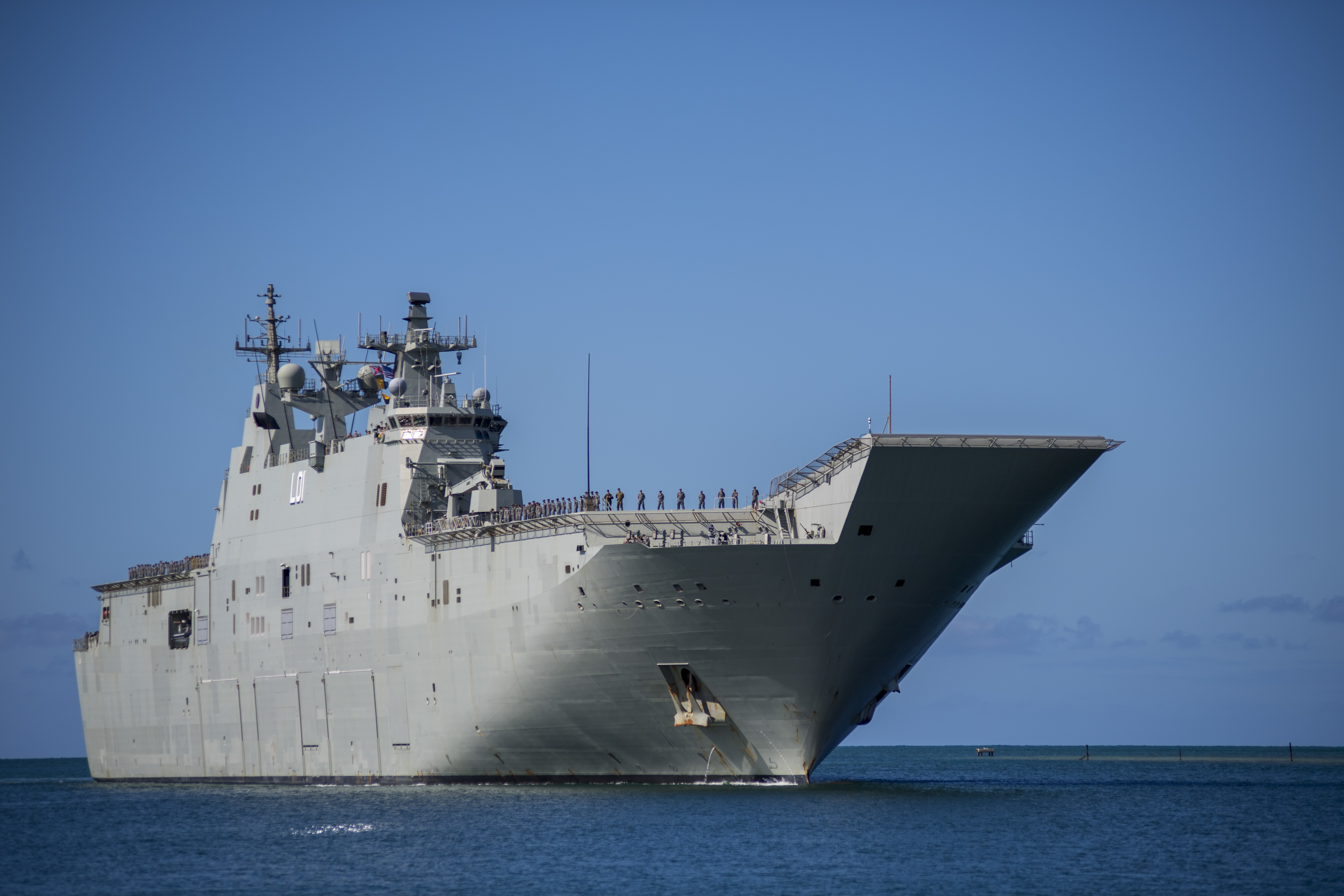
Adelaide in 2018

The Canberra-class vessels are 230.82 metres (757.3 ft) long overall, with a maximum beam of 32 metres (105 ft), and a maximum draught of 7.08 metres (23.2 ft). At full load, Adelaide will displace 27,500 tonnes (27,100 long tons; 30,300 short tons), making the Canberra-class ships the largest vessels to serve in the RAN. Propulsion is provided by two Siemens Energy SiPOD 11-megawatt (15,000 hp) azimuth thrusters, each with an onboard electric motor, driving two 4.5-metre (15 ft) diameter propellers. The electricity is provided by a Combined diesel-electric and gas system, with a single General Electric LM2500 turbine producing 19,160 kilowatts (25,690 hp), supported by two Navantia MAN 16V32/40 diesel generators, each providing 7,448 kilowatts (9,988 hp). Maximum speed is over 20 knots (37 km/h; 23 mph), with a maximum sustainable full-load speed of 19 knots (35 km/h; 22 mph), and an economical cruising speed of 15 knots (28 km/h; 17 mph). Economical range is 9,000 nautical miles (17,000 km; 10,000 mi).

Each ship is fitted with a Saab 9LV Mark 4 combat management system. The sensor suite includes a Sea Giraffe 3D surveillance radar, and a Vampir NG infrared search and track system. For self-defence, the LHDs will be fitted with four Rafael Typhoon 25 mm remote weapons systems (one in each corner of the flight deck), six 12.7 mm machine guns, an AN/SLQ-25 Nixie towed torpedo decoy, and a Nulka missile decoy. Defence against aircraft and larger targets is to be provided by escort vessels and air support from the Royal Australian Air Force (RAAF). The ships' companies will consist of 358 personnel; 293 RAN, 62 Australian Army, and 3 RAAF.

The LHDs will transport 1,046 soldiers and their equipment. Adelaide will be capable of deploying a reinforced company of up to 220 soldiers at a time by airlift. Two vehicle decks (one for light vehicles, the other for heavy vehicles and tanks) have areas of 1,880 square metres (20,200 sq ft) and 1,410 square metres (15,200 sq ft) respectively, and between them can accommodate up to 110 vehicles. The well deck will carry up to four LHD Landing Craft, which can be launched and recovered in conditions up to Sea State 4. The flight deck can operate six MRH-90-size helicopters or four Chinook-size helicopters simultaneously, in conditions up to Sea State 5. A mix of MRH-90 transport helicopters and S-70B Seahawk anti-submarine helicopters will be carried: up to eight can be stored in the hangar deck, and the light vehicle deck can be repurposed to fit another ten. The ski-jump ramp of Juan Carlos I has been retained for the RAN ships, although fixed-wing flight operations are not planned for the ships.

== Construction ==
Construction of Adelaide began at Navantia's shipyard in Ferrol, northern Spain, during February 2010, when the first steel was cut. Hull modules were fabricated at Ferrol and Fene, with the first hull blocks laid down on 18 February 2011. Adelaide's hull was launched on 4 July 2012. Initially, the ship was due to reach Australia in early 2013 to begin final fitout and superstructure installation at BAE Systems Australia facilities at Williamstown Dockyard, but instead, the hull was loaded onto Blue Marlin on 10 December 2013 in Vigo Bay. Blue Marlin and Adelaide arrived at Williamstown Dockyard on 7 February 2014. On 17 June 2015, Adelaide departed from Williamstown to commence sea trials, which included sailing to Sydney for docking at Garden Island, before returning to Williamstown on 11 July. A second set of trials ran from 19 to 28 August, and the ship was delivered to Fleet Base East two days later.

Entry into Royal Australian Navy (RAN) service was originally planned for mid-2015, but was pushed back to sometime in 2016. Fitting out of the ship progressed at a faster rate than expected, which brought the predicted commissioning date back to September 2015, although this did not eventuate. The ship was handed over on 22 October, and was commissioned into the RAN on 4 December. Although identified as LHD02 during construction, Adelaide received the pennant number L01 on commissioning; the number corresponding to that used by the frigate of the same name.

== Operational history ==
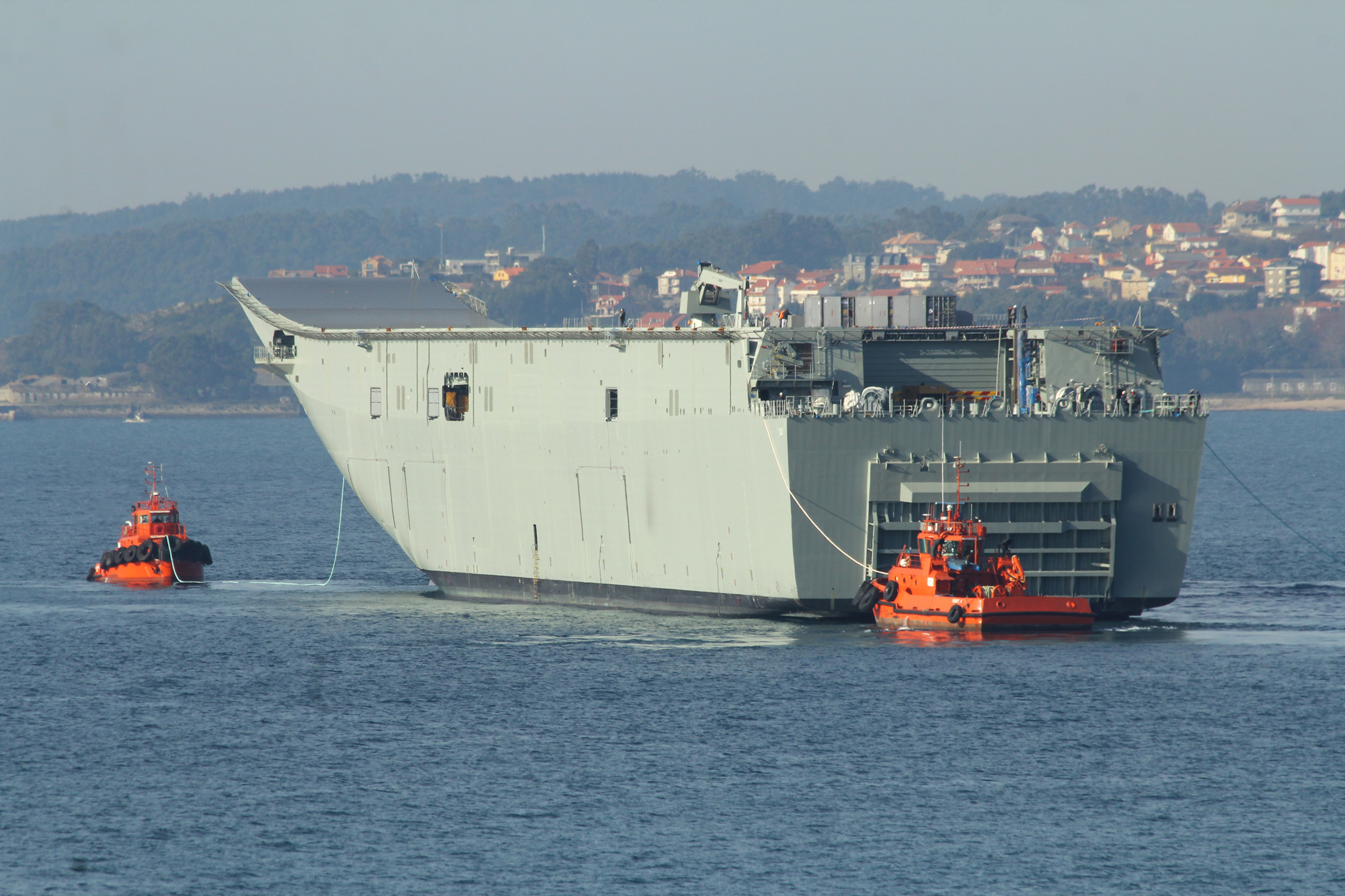
The hull of Adelaide being towed across Vigo Bay, shortly before being loaded onto the heavy lift ship MV Blue Marlin

In early 2016, Adelaide undertook post-commissioning trials and other activities as the ship was worked up to full operational status.

In September 2016, Adelaide took part in Exercise Kakadu 2016, based at Darwin, Northern Territory.

On 12 December 2016, Adelaide intercepted the 50m former Japanese whaling vessel Kaiyo Maru No. 8 in international waters in the Southern Ocean, south-east of Tasmania. The vessel had attracted the attention of Maritime Border Command after loitering and circling more than 200 nautical miles off the southern coast of Australia. Tactical Assault Group personnel boarded the vessel and located suspected illicit drugs, after which the vessel was escorted to Hobart with approximately 186 kilograms of cocaine located on board. The vessel was loitering after a botched rendezvous 300 nautical miles off the coast of Port Fairy in Victoria.

In September 2017, Adelaide sailed as part of the largest Australian task group to deploy since the early 1980s on Exercise Indo-Pacific Endeavour 2017. This was planned as a series of exercises with nations around the Pacific Rim testing communications, disaster relief plans and regional security. Adelaide was accompanied by fleet oiler HMAS Sirius and a varying number of escorts, with a total of four frigates (Melbourne, Darwin, Toowoomba and Parramatta) sailing from Sydney on 4 September 2017. The last time such a large deployment of Australian warships went to sea was September 1980, led by the aircraft carrier HMAS Melbourne.

On 5 January 2020, Adelaide sailed as part of Operation Bushfire Assist, assisting with the Royal Australian Navy's ongoing efforts to help evacuate people from bushfire zones that have become cut off by road and air due to conditions.

On 18 January 2022, Adelaide departed from Sydney for Brisbane on its way to provide disaster relief to Tonga following the Hunga Tonga–Hunga Ha'apai eruption and tsunami. On 25 January, the Department of Defence confirmed that 23 crew members aboard the Adelaide had tested positive for COVID-19 while en route to Tonga. On 26 January, the Adelaide docked in Tonga to make a contactless delivery to avoid COVID-19 transmissions. During its period at Tonga, the ship was crippled for several days when its main and backup power systems failed. It was reported that as a result of the power failure, most of the crew were forced to sleep "above deck". On 17 February, navy officials revealed the first power outage on 29 January was likely due to volcanic debris in seawater blocking the cooling systems of the ship's diesel generators, which eventually led to multiple system failures. The second outage on 30 January was a fault on the gas turbine.

In September 2022, Adelaide participated in Exercise Trident, a joint amphibious landing exercise with the Singapore Armed Forces at the Shoalwater Bay Training Area. More than 1,600 personnel from both nations were involved, as well as two Republic of Singapore Navy landing platform docks (RSS Endurance and RSS Persistence), Chinook and Apache helicopters, and LHD Landing Craft (LLC).
