= Canberra-class landing helicopter dock =

Australian naval amphibious ship class

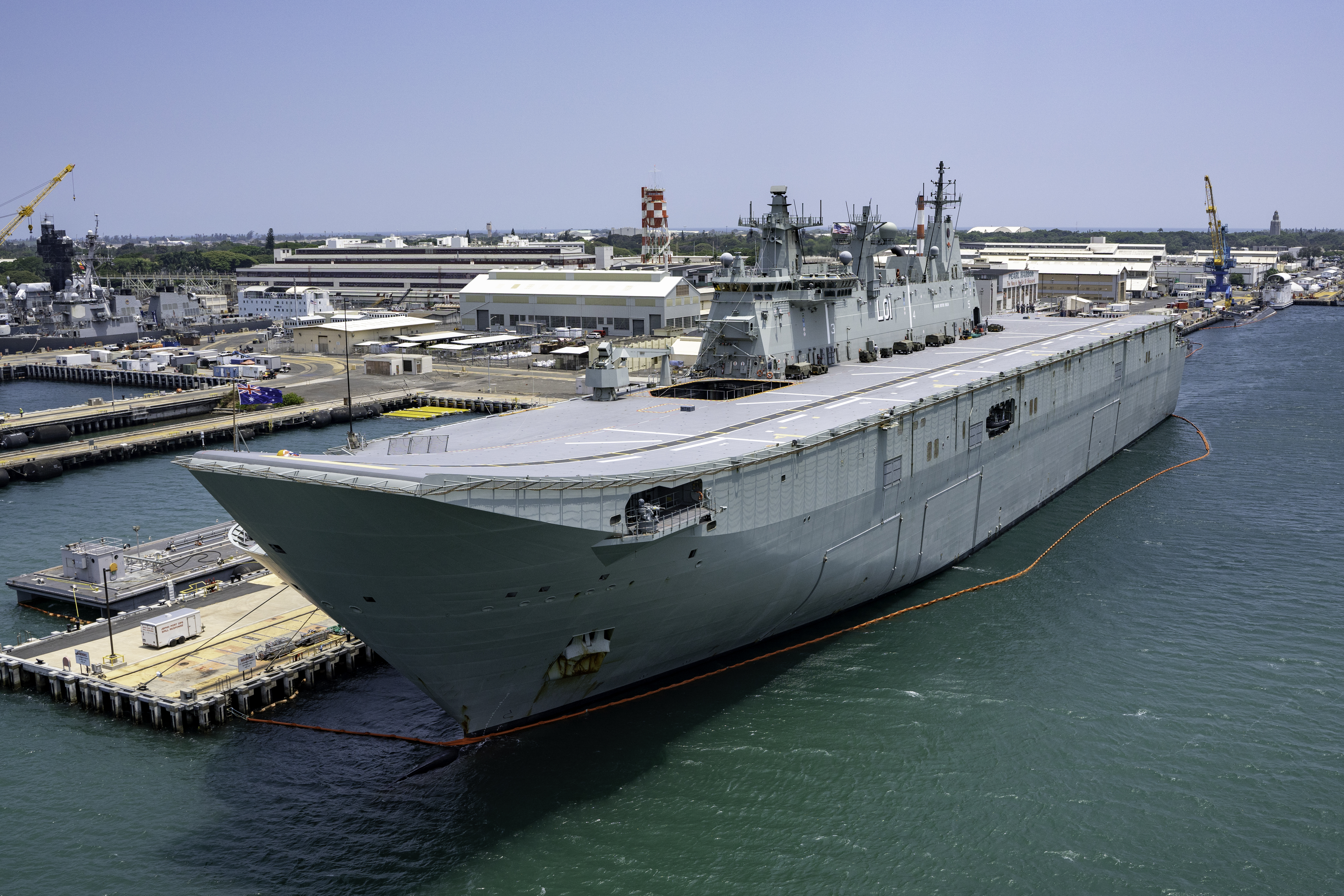
- Adelaide at Pearl Harbor, July 2018

Class overview
- Builders: Navantia, Ferrol, Spain and BAE Systems Australia, Victoria
- Operators: Royal Australian Navy
- Preceded by: HMAS Tobruk, Kanimbla class
- Cost: A$3.1 billion (2007) for two units; A$1.55 billion (2007) per unit
- Built: 2009–2015
- In commission: 2014–present
- Planned: 2
- Completed: 2
- Active: 2

General characteristics
- Type: Landing helicopter dock
- Displacement: 27,500 t (27,100 long tons) at full load
- Length: 230.82 m (757 ft 3 in)
- Beam: 32.0 m (105 ft 0 in)
- Draft: 7.08 m (23 ft 3 in)
- Installed power: 1 × GE LM2500 gas turbine 19.1 MW (25,600 shp); 2 × Navantia MAN 16V32/40 diesel generators, 7.4 MW (9,900 shp) each
- Propulsion: Integrated Electric Propulsion; 2 × Siemens Navantia azimuth thrusters, 11 MW (15,000 shp) each
- Speed: Over 20 knots (37 km/h; 23 mph) maximum; 19 knots (35 km/h; 22 mph) full-load sustained; 15 knots (28 km/h; 17 mph) economical
- Range: 9,000 nmi (17,000 km; 10,000 mi) at 15 knots (28 km/h; 17 mph)
- Boats & landing craft carried: 4 × LHD Landing Craft; 2 x 7.2m RHIBs in port and starboard boat bays
- Capacity: Up to 110 vehicles; Heavy vehicle deck: 1,410 m^{2} (15,200 sq ft); Light vehicle deck: 1,880 m^{2} (20,200 sq ft)
- Troops: 1,046 standard; 1,600 overload
- Complement: 358 personnel; 293 RAN, 62 Australian Army, 3 RAAF
- Sensors & processing systems: Giraffe AMB radar; Saab 9LV combat system
- Electronic warfare & decoys: AN/SLQ-25C Nixie towed torpedo decoy; Nulka missile decoy
- Armament: 4 × Rafael Typhoon 25 mm (1.0 in) remote weapons systems; 6 × 12.7 mm (0.5 in) machine guns
- Aircraft carried: 8 helicopters (standard); 18 helicopters (maximum hangar space)
- Aviation facilities: Flight deck with 13-degree ski-jump, 6 in-line deck landing spots

The Canberra class is a ship class of two landing helicopter dock (LHD) ships built for the Royal Australian Navy (RAN). Planning to upgrade the navy's amphibious fleet began in 2000, based on Australian experiences leading the International Force for East Timor peacekeeping operation. With a new climate for growing Australian Navy spending, a desire existed for forward defence capability for landing and supporting troops on Asian territory, that had never existed in Australian history, even with the old Majestic-class light fleet carriers, HMAS Melbourne and HMAS Sydney in the 1970s. In 2004, French company Direction des Constructions Navales (DCN) and Spanish company Navantia were invited to tender proposals, with DCN offering the Mistral-class amphibious assault ship and Navantia proposing the "Buque de Proyección Estratégica" design (later commissioned as Juan Carlos I). The Spanish design was selected in 2007, with Navantia responsible for construction of the ships from the keel to the flight deck, and BAE Systems Australia handling the fabrication of the combat and communications systems. Finally, Siemens (Germany) supplied and fitted the azimuth thrusters.

Construction of the first ship, HMAS Canberra, commenced in late 2008, with the hull launched in early 2011, and sea trials in early 2014. Canberra was commissioned in November 2014. Work on the second vessel, HMAS Adelaide, started in early 2010. Adelaide was commissioned in December 2015. They are the largest vessels ever operated by the RAN, with a displacement of 27,500 tonnes (27,100 long tons; 30,300 short tons).

The ships are home-ported at Fleet Base East in Sydney (which has prompted complaints from nearby residents about machinery noise, exhaust fumes, and blocked views) and will regularly operate out of Townsville, the location of Lavarack Barracks, home of the Australian Army's 3rd Brigade. In addition to being located in North Queensland close to Asia and the Pacific Islands, one of the 3rd Brigade's infantry battalions, the 2nd Battalion, Royal Australian Regiment (2 RAR), was selected to become the Army's specialist amphibious infantry battalion.

== Planning and selection ==
Planning to replace the Kanimbla-class landing platform amphibious ships Kanimbla and Manoora, and the heavy landing ship Tobruk began as early as 2000, with the intention announced in the Defence 2000: Our Future Defence Force white paper. The importance of amphibious warfare had been demonstrated during Australia's leadership of the International Force for East Timor peacekeeping operation: the difficulty in supporting an expeditionary force to one of Australia's nearest neighbours demonstrated the need for an improved amphibious sealift capability. In November 2003, the Minister for Defence, Robert Hill, released a Defence Capability Review, which stated that two ships of at least 20,000 tonnes (20,000 long tons; 22,000 short tons) displacement and capable of launching five to six helicopters simultaneously were being sought. The acquisition was included under the procurement designation Project JP2048: although Phase 1 of JP2048 looked at a new type of landing craft for the Kanimbla class (the LCM2000), Phases 2 and 4 were to identify, then acquire the new amphibious warfare ships, and Phase 3 covered the design and construction of compatible landing craft (12 LCM-1E, ordered on 27 September 2011). The ships were originally to replace one of the Kanimbla-class ships and Tobruk, with the other Kanimbla-class ship later replaced by a strategic sealift ship.

In January 2006, the Australian government announced the names for the planned ships: Canberra and Adelaide. After the announcement, suggestions for alternate names were expressed in several venues. The Navy League of Australia proposed that Adelaide should instead be named Australia; using the name of the nation and its capital for the RAN's two most powerful ships, as had been the case with the navy's two World War II-era County-class cruisers, while freeing the name up for the League's proposed fourth Hobart-class destroyer. Alternately, a member of the Australian Naval Institute opined that the ships should be named Gallipoli and Guadalcanal; the first reflecting the landings at Gallipoli, one of the first amphibious operations of the modern era, the second recognising the amphibious campaign to recapture Guadalcanal and the efforts of the United States Navy and United States Marine Corps in aiding Australia during World War II.

Comparative statistics of proposed designs Kanimbla class included for comparison
	DCN	Navantia	Kanimbla
Displacement (t)	24,000	27,000	8,500
Range (nmi)	11,000	9,000	14,000
Personnel	177	240	210
Troops	1,000	1,100	450
Vehicles (m2)	1,000	2,000	700
Helicopters	16	11	4
Landing spots	6	6	2/3
Landing craft	4 LCM	4 LCM-1E	2 LCM-8

A Request For Information and invitation for tenders was sent to two European shipbuilders in February 2004; French company Direction des Constructions Navales (DCN) and Spanish company Navantia. Shipbuilders from the United States were not included, as American amphibious warfare ships were too large for Australian requirements, and were either too personnel-intensive or could not operate the number of helicopters required. DCN responded with an enlarged version of the Mistral-class amphibious assault ship; 2,000 tonnes (2,000 long tons; 2,200 short tons) greater displacement than the 22,000-tonne (22,000-long-ton; 24,000-short-ton) vessels active with the French Navy. A design being built by Navantia for the Spanish Navy, the "Buque de Proyección Estratégica" (Strategic Projection Ship, later commissioned as Juan Carlos I) was offered by the Spanish, partnering with Australian company Tenix Defence. Although 4,000 tonnes (3,900 long tons; 4,400 short tons) larger and with an increased troop, vehicle, and helicopter carrying capability compared to the Mistrals, the Spanish ship was still under construction at the time of the offer, and was not due to enter service until late 2008. On 20 June 2007, Minister for Defence Brendan Nelson announced that the A$3 billion contract to build the Canberra class had been awarded to Navantia and Tenix. Although an unproven design, the Spanish offer was closer to the RAN's requested requirements, and there were benefits from ordering the Canberras and the new Hobart-class air warfare destroyers from the same company.

At around the time the decision to purchase the ships was made, many defence analysts advocated for acquiring a larger number of smaller vessels on the grounds that this would be better suited to conditions in Australia's region. However, the Navy's Sea Power Centre argued that large amphibious vessels would provide greater flexibility.

Hugh White, a former leading defence planner for the Hawke and Howard Governments, ANU Professor and defence writer for the SMH, has long been a critic of the decision to acquire the Canberra-class ships. In 2004 he argued that the Australian Defence Force did not need the capacity to conduct a major opposed amphibious operation, as it was unlikely to ever be called upon to do so, and the money needed to purchase the vessels would be better spent on smaller amphibious ships and other defence capabilities. In 2016 White judged the ships to be a 'terrible and heroic, waste of money and nothing more than, 'big, fat... targets in the South China Sea'. which are too vulnerable for deployment in a serious crisis.

== Design and capabilities ==
The Canberra-class vessels are 230.82 metres (757 ft 3 in) long overall, with a maximum beam of 32 metres (105 ft 0 in), and a maximum draught of 7.08 metres (23 ft 3 in). Keeping the maximum draught low was an important factor during design, allowing the ships to operate in littoral waters and small harbours. At full load, each ship will displace 27,500 tonnes (30,300 short tons; 27,100 long tons), making them the largest vessels to serve in the RAN. The Canberras have the same physical dimensions as Juan Carlos I, but differ in the design of the island superstructure and the internal layout, in order to meet Australian conditions and requirements. Unlike the Spanish vessel, the Australian ships are built to meet Lloyd's Naval Rules.

Propulsion is provided by two Siemens Navantia 11-megawatt (15,000 hp) azimuth thrusters, each with an onboard electric motor, driving two 4.5-metre (15 ft) diameter propellers. The electricity is provided by a combined diesel and gas system, with a single General Electric LM2500 turbine producing 19,160 kilowatts (25,690 hp), supported by two Navantia MAN 16V32/40 diesel generators providing 7,448 kilowatts (9,988 hp). The main thrusters are supplemented by two 1,500 kilowatts (2,000 hp) bow thrusters, and a 1,350-kilowatt (1,810 hp) Progener-Mitsubishi S16MPTA diesel generator is fitted as an emergency backup. The vessels have a maximum speed of over 20 knots (37 km/h; 23 mph), a maximum sustainable full-load speed of 19 knots (35 km/h; 22 mph), and an economical cruising speed of 15 knots (28 km/h; 17 mph), with a corresponding range of 9,000 nautical miles (17,000 km; 10,000 mi). The LHDs can maintain full directional control while reversing at up to 8 knots (15 km/h; 9.2 mph).

HMAS Canberra was reported to have completed a major maintenance period in the Captain Cook Graving Dock at Garden Island during which the propulsion pods were replaced including new 4 bladed propellers. At the time of reporting (March 2021) Canberra was preparing for sea trials and plans were being made for HMAS Adelaide to undergo similar maintenance.

Each ship is fitted with a Saab 9LV Mark 4 combat management system. The sensor suite includes a Sea Giraffe 3D surveillance radar, and a Vampir NG infrared search and track system. For self-defence, the LHDs are fitted with four Rafael Typhoon 25 mm (1.0 in) remote weapons systems (one in each corner of the flight deck), six 12.7 mm (0.5 in) machine guns, an AN/SLQ-25 Nixie towed torpedo decoy, and a Nulka missile decoy. Planned upgrades include the installation of up to three Phalanx CIWS from 2018. Defence against aircraft and larger targets is to be provided by escort vessels and air support from the Royal Australian Air Force (RAAF). The ships' companies consist of 358 personnel; 293 RAN, 62 Australian Army, and 3 RAAF.

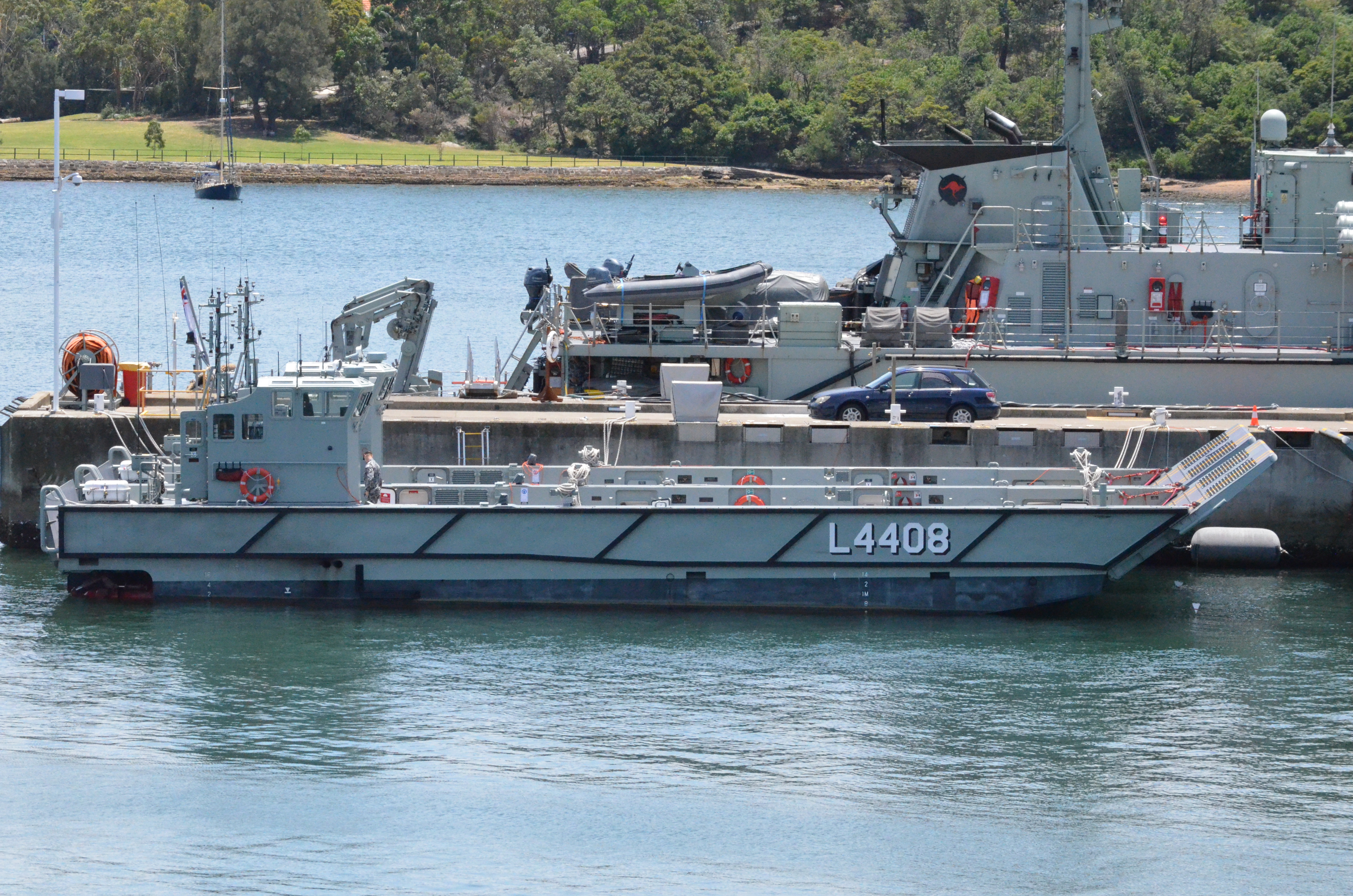
LHD Landing Craft L4408 (with a second LCC berthed behind it)

The LHDs are able to transport 1,046 soldiers and their equipment, and can carry 1,600 in overload conditions. The embarked force is called the Amphibious Ready Element Landing Force (ARE-LE) based on an infantry company of up to 220 soldiers. Army planners considered several options for forming an amphibious force including training a dedicated infantry battalion, training several battalions with battalion rotations or creating a brigade size force similar to the U.S. Marines MEU and Royal Marines 3 Commando Brigade structure. In December 2011, 2nd Battalion, Royal Australian Regiment (2RAR) was selected to develop the initial amphibious capability with the Chief of Army stating that as the capability is developed a future model for the force will be decided. A special forces capability will be provided by the 2nd Commando Regiment with the potential in the future for elements of 2RAR to be trained in certain special forces skills. Two vehicle decks (one for light vehicles, the other for heavy vehicles and tanks) have areas of 1,880 square metres (20,200 sq ft) and 1,410 square metres (15,200 sq ft) respectively, and between them can accommodate up to 110 vehicles. The heavy vehicle deck may alternately be used for cargo, with a capacity of 196 shipping containers. Each ship has a 69.3-by-16.8-metre (227 by 55 ft) well deck, that houses up to four LHD Landing Craft (LLC, the RAN designation for the LCM-1E), which can be launched and recovered in conditions up to Sea State 4. Twelve were ordered from Navantia, which delivered them in batches of four during 2014 and 2015. Six LLC are assigned to each LHD, with the additional craft used for training and trials at shore bases, and rotated to their parent ship when embarked craft require maintenance. The well deck also has room for four rigid-hulled inflatable boats (although these will not be carried as standard), and can be used by other nations' landing craft and amphibious vehicles.

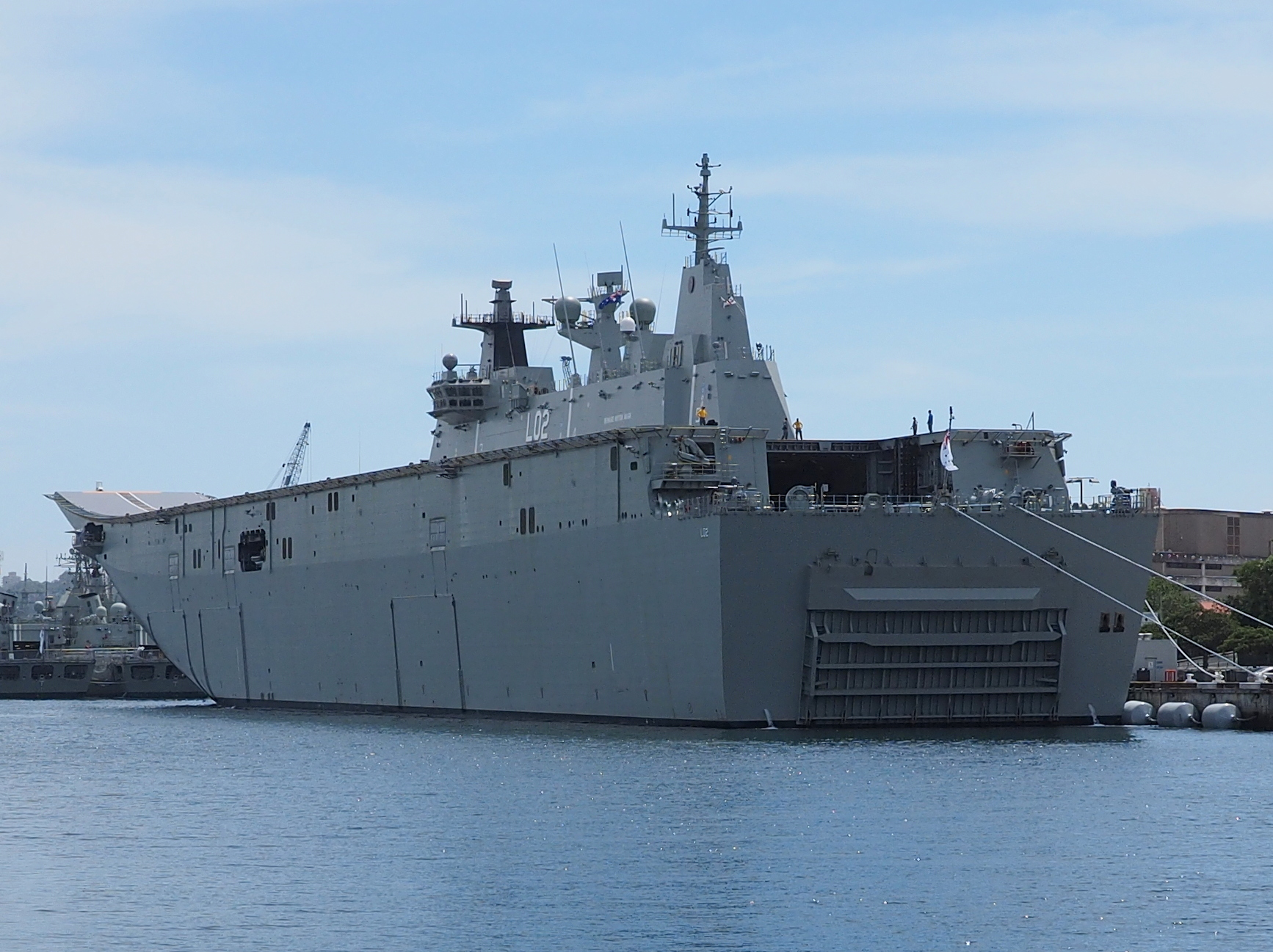
Stern view of Canberra

The flight deck is 202.3 by 32 metres (664 by 105 ft) and sits at a height of 27.5 metres (90 ft), with six spots for helicopters up to MRH-90 size to operate simultaneously. Alternately, helicopters up to Chinook size can take off or land simultaneously on four spots on the flight deck. Flight operations can be conducted up to Sea State 5. The standard air group aboard these ships will be a mix of MRH-90 transport helicopters and MH-60R anti-submarine helicopters. The 990 square metres (10,700 sq ft) hangar deck can accommodate eight medium-size helicopters, and an additional ten can be carried if the light vehicle deck is used for additional helicopter space. Two aircraft lifts (one large one centre-aft, and a smaller one to starboard and in front of the island superstructure) connect the flight and hangar decks.

The ski-jump ramp of Juan Carlos I has been retained for the RAN ships, although is not intended for use. The Spanish use the ramp to launch Harrier jet aircraft, and although operating STOVL aircraft was decided against early in the Australian procurement process due to cost and detraction from the ships' main role, redesigning the ship to remove the ramp would have added unnecessary cost to the project. The retention of the ski-jump has prompted multiple recommendations that fixed-wing aircraft be operated from the ships (primarily envisaged as a flight group of F-35B Lightning II STOVL aircraft). The RAN has maintained that embarking Australian-operated, fixed-wing aircraft was not under consideration, although has conceded that cross-decking with other nations' aircraft could possibly occur. In May 2014, Minister for Defence David Johnston stated in media interviews that the government was considering acquiring F-35B fighters for the Canberras, and Prime Minister Tony Abbott instructed 2015 Defence White Paper planners to consider the option of embarking F-35B squadrons aboard the two ships. This assessment found that the cost of modifying the ships to operate jets would be very high, and the idea was rejected before the completion of the White Paper.

Opponents to operating F-35s from the Canberra class state that embarking enough aircraft to be an effective force would require abandoning their capability as amphibious warfare vessels, operating as an aircraft carrier would make the ships higher profile targets and need greater escorting forces, existing fuel and ordnance storage would not be able to sustain fixed-wing operations, structural modifications were needed to reinforce and heat-treat the flight deck to withstand F-35B vertical thrust, and the F-35B project itself has been the most expensive and most problematic of the three Joint Strike Fighter variants. Supporters counter that providing fixed-wing air support close to amphibious operations maximises aircraft capability, other nations are already working on solutions to structural and thrust problems for other Harrier-era ships, and the presence of a ski-jump makes the vessels already more suitable for STOVL operations than equivalent amphibious ships with flat flight decks.

== Construction ==
Navantia was contracted to construct the hulls from 104 'blocks' or 'modules', which were fabricated individually at Navantia's facilities in Ferrol and Fene, then combined on the slipway at the Ferrol shipyard. The Canberras were built up to the flight deck, launched, then transported by Dockwise's heavy lift ship, Blue Marlin, to Williamstown Dockyard, where the installation of the island superstructure and the internal fitout of the hull was completed by BAE Systems Australia (which acquired Tenix in mid-2008).

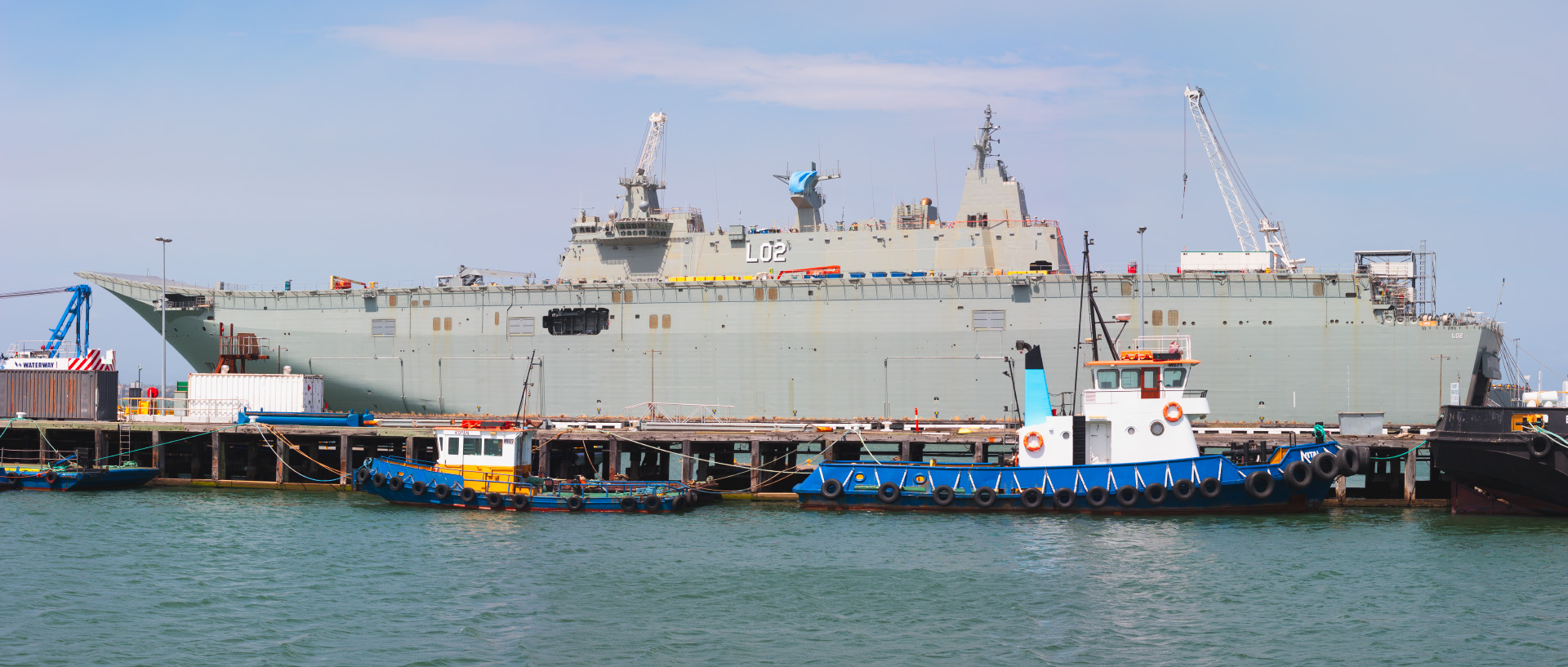
Canberra fitting out at Williamstown Dockyard in February 2014

Construction of Canberra began in September 2008, when the first steel was cut. The first three blocks were laid down on 23 September 2010. She was launched on 17 February 2011. The hull was loaded onto the heavy lift ship Blue Marlin on 4 August 2012, with Blue Marlin departing Ferrol for Williamstown on 17 August, and arriving in Port Phillip on 17 October. Canberra commenced sea trials on 3 March 2014. Contractor-run sea trials concluded in early September, and Canberra was commissioned into the RAN on 28 November 2014.

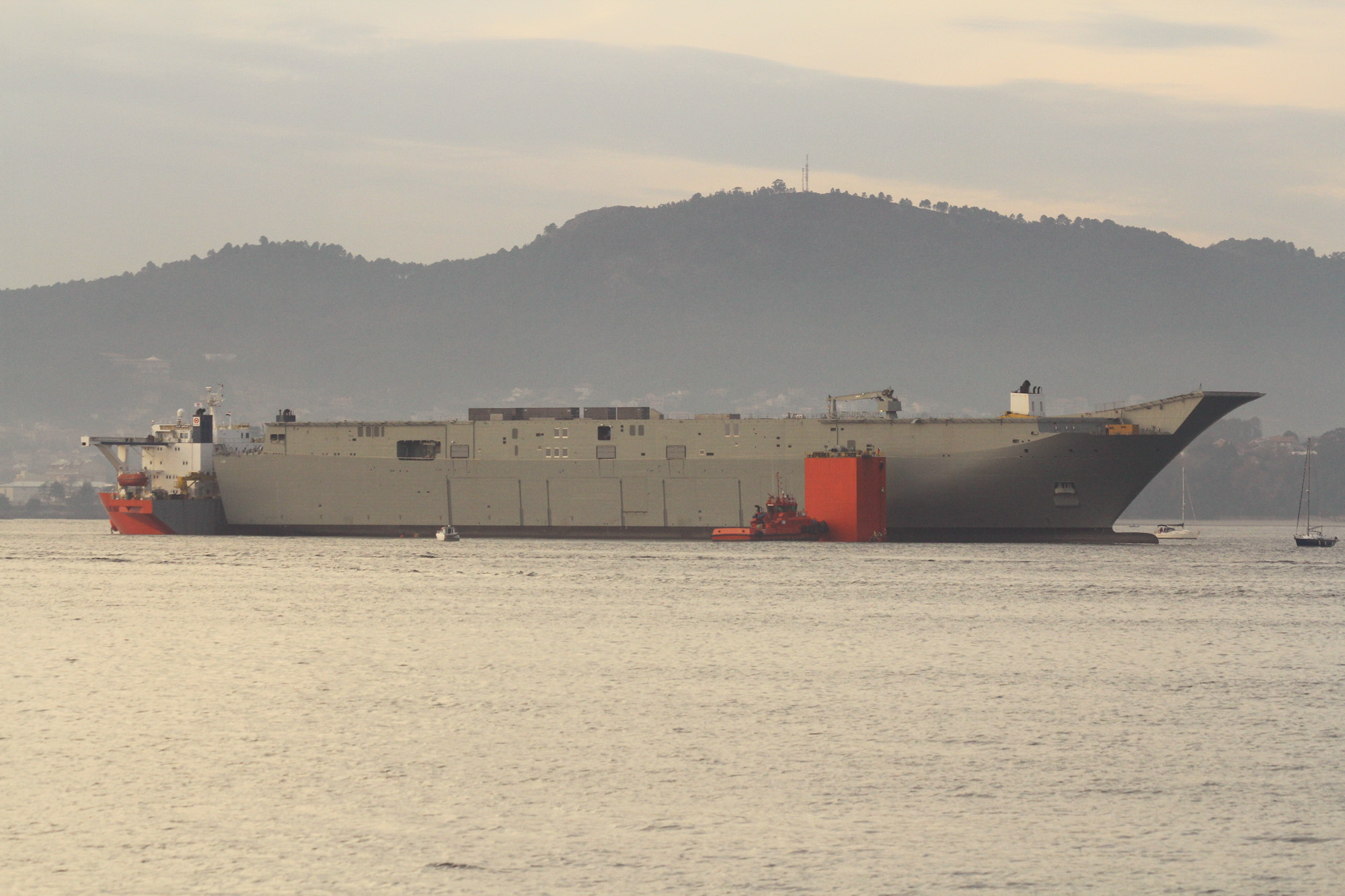
Adelaide being loaded onto the heavy lift ship Blue Marlin at Vigo Bay, prior to being transported to Williamstown for completion

Work on Adelaide began during February 2010, when the first steel was cut. The first hull blocks were laid down on 18 February 2011, and Adelaide was launched on 4 July 2012. Initially, the ship was due to reach Australia in early 2013 to begin final fitout, but this did not occur. The hull was loaded onto Blue Marlin on 10 December 2013 in Vigo Bay. Blue Marlin and Adelaide arrived at Williamstown on 7 February 2014. Entry into RAN service was originally planned for mid-2015, but as of July 2011, this had been pushed back to sometime in 2016. Fitting out of the ship progressed at a faster rate than expected, which brought the predicted commissioning date back to late 2015. After sea trials ended in October, Adelaide was commissioned on 4 December 2015. Although Canberra was identified as "LHD01" and Adelaide as "LHD02" during construction, the ships were commissioned with the pennant numbers LHD 02 and LHD 01 respectively. The reversal of the numbers causes the new ships' pennants to correspond to the Adelaide-class frigates with the same names.

The early decommissioning of the two Kanimbla-class vessels in 2011, several years before Canberra-class ships would enter service, led to the acquisition of the landing ship dock HMAS Choules and the support vessel ADV Ocean Shield. The latter was only intended as a stop-gap acquisition, and in mid-2014, Ocean Shield was transferred to the Australian Customs and Border Protection Service.

== Ships ==
Name	Pennant Number	Builder	Laid down	Launched	Commissioned	Status
Canberra	L02	Navantia, Ferrol (Construction); BAE Systems Australia, Williamstown Dockyard (Fitting out)	23 September 2009	17 February 2011	28 November 2014	Active
Adelaide	L01	Navantia, Ferrol (Construction); BAE Systems Australia, Williamstown Dockyard (Fitting out)	18 February 2011	4 July 2012	4 December 2015	Active

== Basing arrangements ==
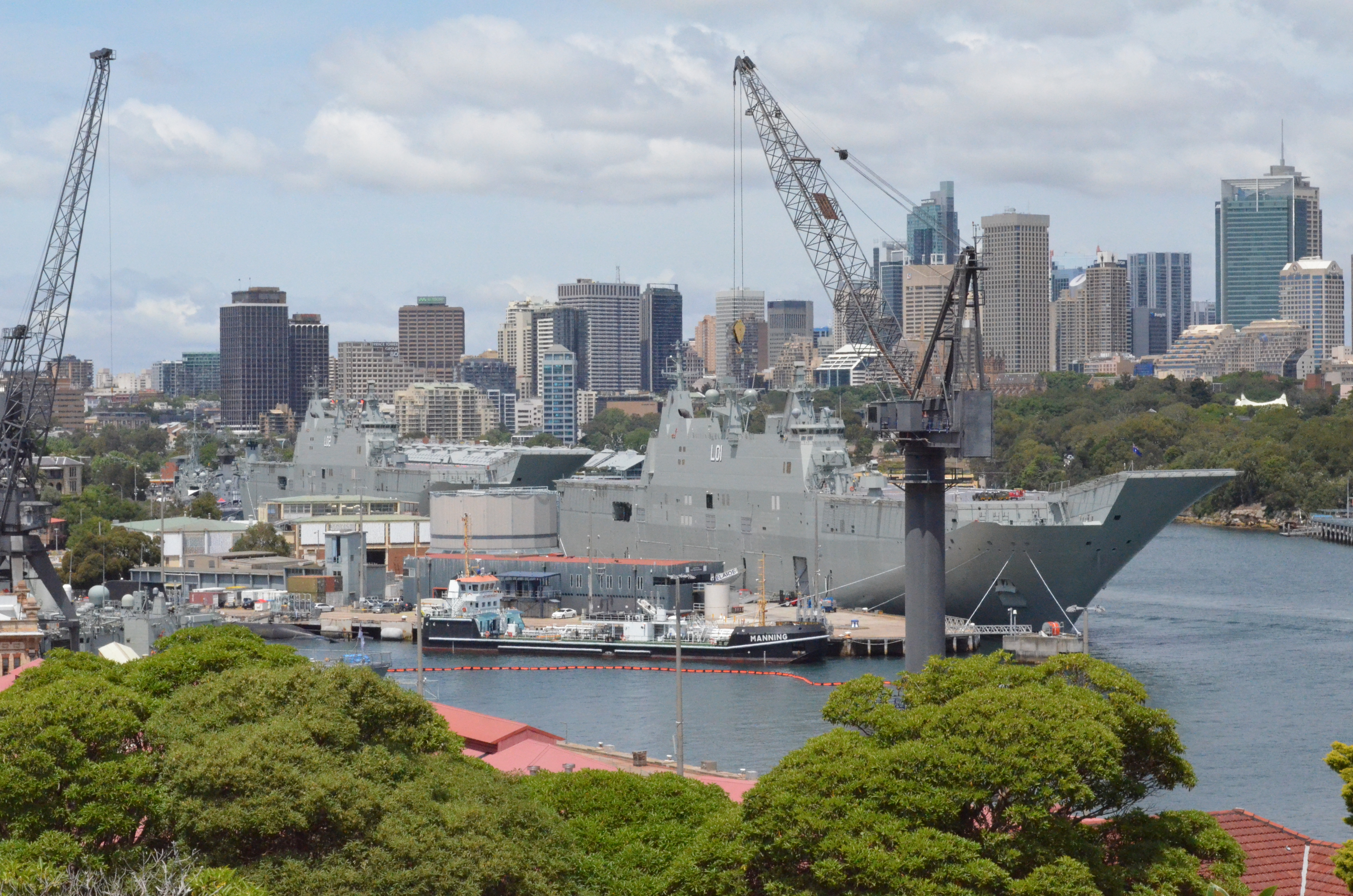
Adelaide and Canberra berthed at Fleet Base East in December 2015

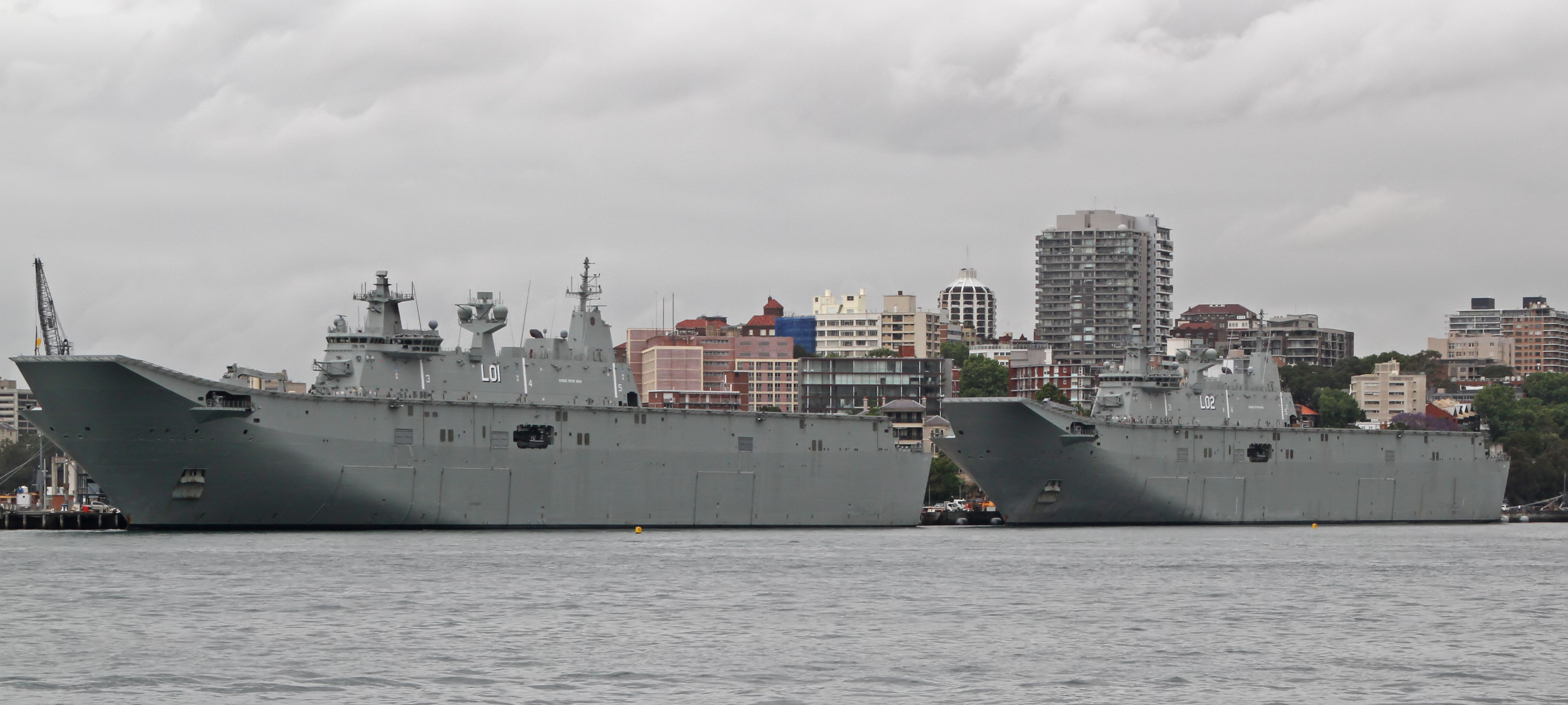
HMAS Adelaide and HMAS Canberra berthed at Fleet Base East in October 2016

The two LHDs are officially home-ported at Fleet Base East in Sydney. On 4 December 2015, the support centre for the class at Garden Island was named after Captain John Robertson. Robertson was commanding officer of the carrier Melbourne at the time of the Melbourne–Voyager collision in 1964, and was widely seen to be a scapegoat after the first Royal Commission found him to be at fault.

Basing the two ships at Fleet Base East prompted complaints, including a short lived unsuccessful public campaign to have the ships based elsewhere from nearby residents in Potts Point and Woolloomooloo. Issues raised include exhaust fumes and noise pollution from the ships' generators and machinery running around-the-clock, and that the large ships block views of Sydney Harbour. To alleviate concerns, Defence began investigating options to relocate one or both ships to the northern portion of Garden Island, and has installed shore-powered air-conditioning units (allowing the ships' onboard generators to be shut down at night). Such units were, however, not installed or deemed a requirement; local residents' objections were considered either incorrect, such as the claim that the ships block views, or minor when compared to the decades-old Navy base as a whole, such as the objections raised about noise.

The ships regularly operate out of Townsville, the base of 2RAR. To this end, the Department of Defence contributed A$30 million to the A$85 million upgrade of the multi-purpose Berth 10 at the Port of Townsville, which was completed in October 2013. Naval vessels have been allocated 45 days of berthing per year. Defence also spent A$5.3 million to lease and develop a dedicated staging area for equipment and personnel within the Port of Townsville precinct.

== See also ==
- List of aircraft carriers in service

Equivalent amphibious warfare ships of the same era

- Trieste class
- Juan Carlos I class
- America class
- Anadolu class
- Type 075
- Project 23900
