= LCM-1E =

Military landing craft

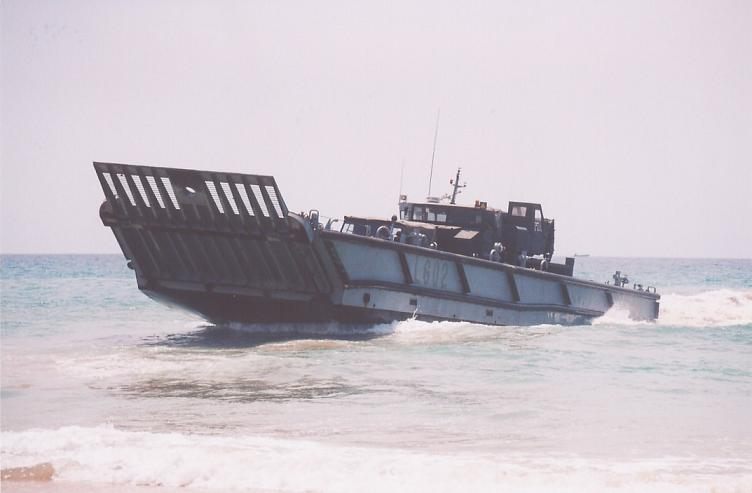
- L-602

Class overview
- Name: LCM-1E
- Builders: Navantia
- Operators: Spanish Navy; Royal Australian Navy
- Preceded by: LCM-8
- Planned: 30
- Completed: 26
- Active: 24
- Retired: 2

General characteristics
- Type: Roll-on/roll-off landing craft mechanised
- Displacement: 56.6 tonnes (55.7 long tons; 62.4 short tons) light; 110 tonnes (110 long tons; 120 short tons) loaded
- Length: 23.3 metres (76 ft)
- Beam: 6.4 metres (21 ft)
- Draught: 1 metre (3 ft 3 in) loaded
- Ramps: Bow ramp and stern gate
- Propulsion: 2 × MAN D-2842 LE 402X diesel engines (809 kW each); 2 × MJP CSU650 waterjets
- Speed: 22 knots (41 km/h; 25 mph) light; 13.5 knots (25.0 km/h; 15.5 mph) loaded
- Range: 190 nautical miles (350 km; 220 mi) at economic speed
- Capacity: 1 × main battle tank, or; 1 × self-propelled howitzer plus resupply vehicle, or; 2 × MOWAG Piranha, or; 6 × light tactical vehicles, or; 170 personnel with equipment
- Complement: 4

The LCM-1E is a class of amphibious mechanized landing craft manufactured by Navantia at their factory in San Fernando. These craft are intended to deliver troops and equipment onshore from amphibious assault ships during amphibious assaults. The craft are operated by the Spanish Navy and the Royal Australian Navy (the latter referring to the vessels as LHD Landing Craft or LLC), and have been ordered by the Turkish Navy.

== Project history and design ==
In 1999, a contract for the construction of two prototypes landing craft (L-601 and L-602), for evaluation and testing in different conditions was signed. These craft would replace the LCM-8s in Spanish Navy service. After undergoing trials, 12 additional units were ordered to service the two Galicia-class landing platform dock ships (Galicia and Castilla) and the amphibious assault ship Juan Carlos I.

The landing craft have the ability to operate over-the-horizon, as they are equipped with radar navigation, GPS, gyro needle/magnetic compasses and HF communications equipment, VHF and UHF. This allows them to operate up to 20 nautical miles (37 km; 23 mi) from their mothership. Propulsion is supplied by two MAN D-2842 LE 402X diesel engines, which supply 809 kilowatts (1,085 hp) each to the two waterjets, allowing the craft to reach 22 knots (41 km/h; 25 mph) unladen, and 13.5 knots (25.0 km/h; 15.5 mph) loaded. Maximum range at economical speeds is 190 nautical miles (350 km; 220 mi).

The LCM-1E incorporates a stern gate, allowing the loading and unloading of vehicles onto all landing craft within the dry stern dock, without having to open the gate to swap landing craft around. In turn, this saves having to dock down the landing platform, and allows re-stowing of vehicles while the landing platform is underway. There is a maximum limit of 12 tons for the transfer of vehicles in this configuration.

== Service ==
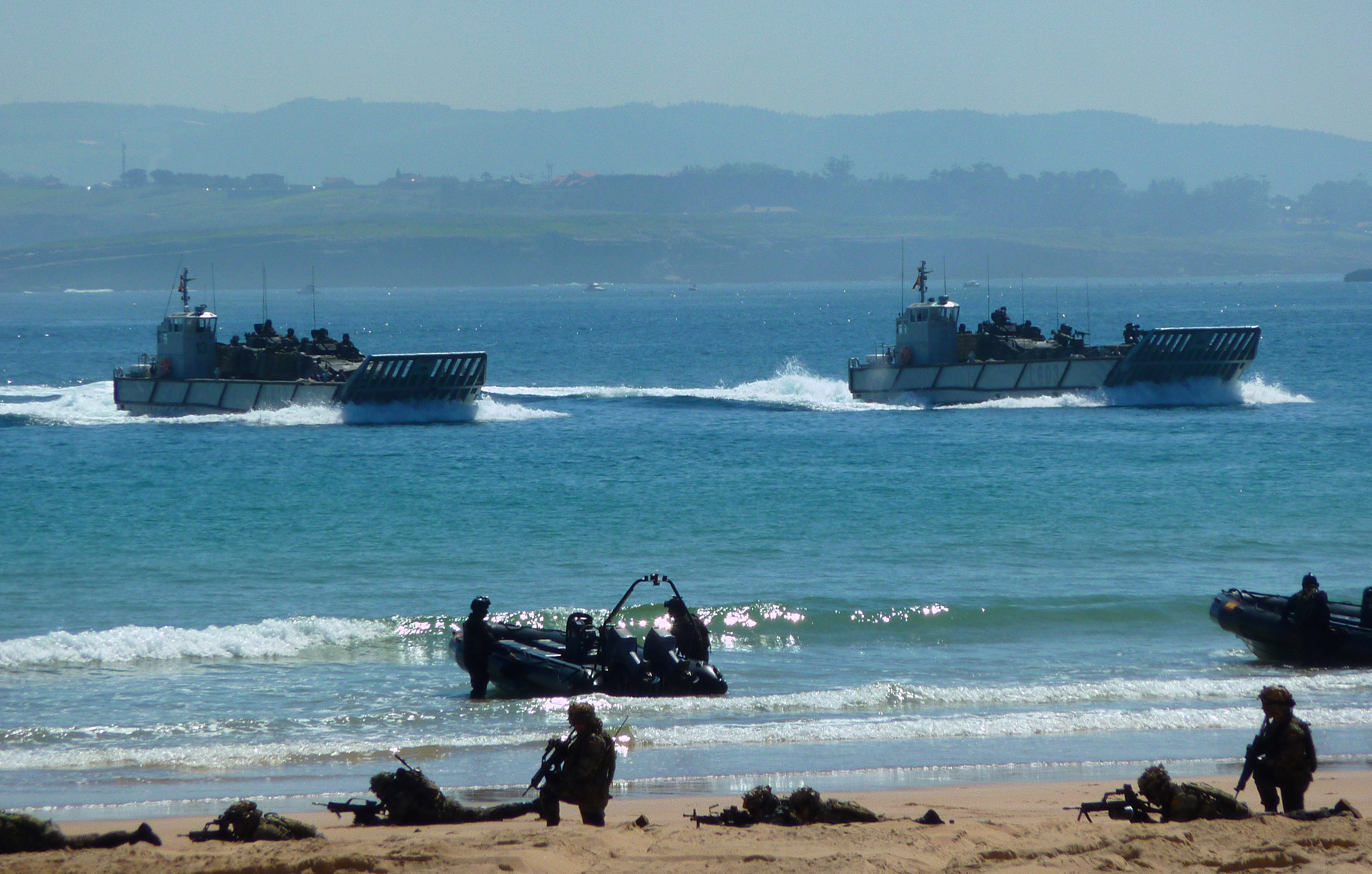
Two Spanish Navy LCM-1E heading for the beach

=== Spain ===
The Spanish LCM-1Es are assigned to the Naval Beach Group, based at Naval Station Props. Since joining the Spanish Navy, four of the 12 units built in the shipyards of San Fernando and Puerto Real have been involved in a mission in Lebanon, where they have been used for beach landing marines.

After the 2010 Haiti earthquake, four LCM-1E were used to land relief personnel and first aid material directly on the beach, avoiding the partially destroyed and highly congested harbours.

=== Australia ===
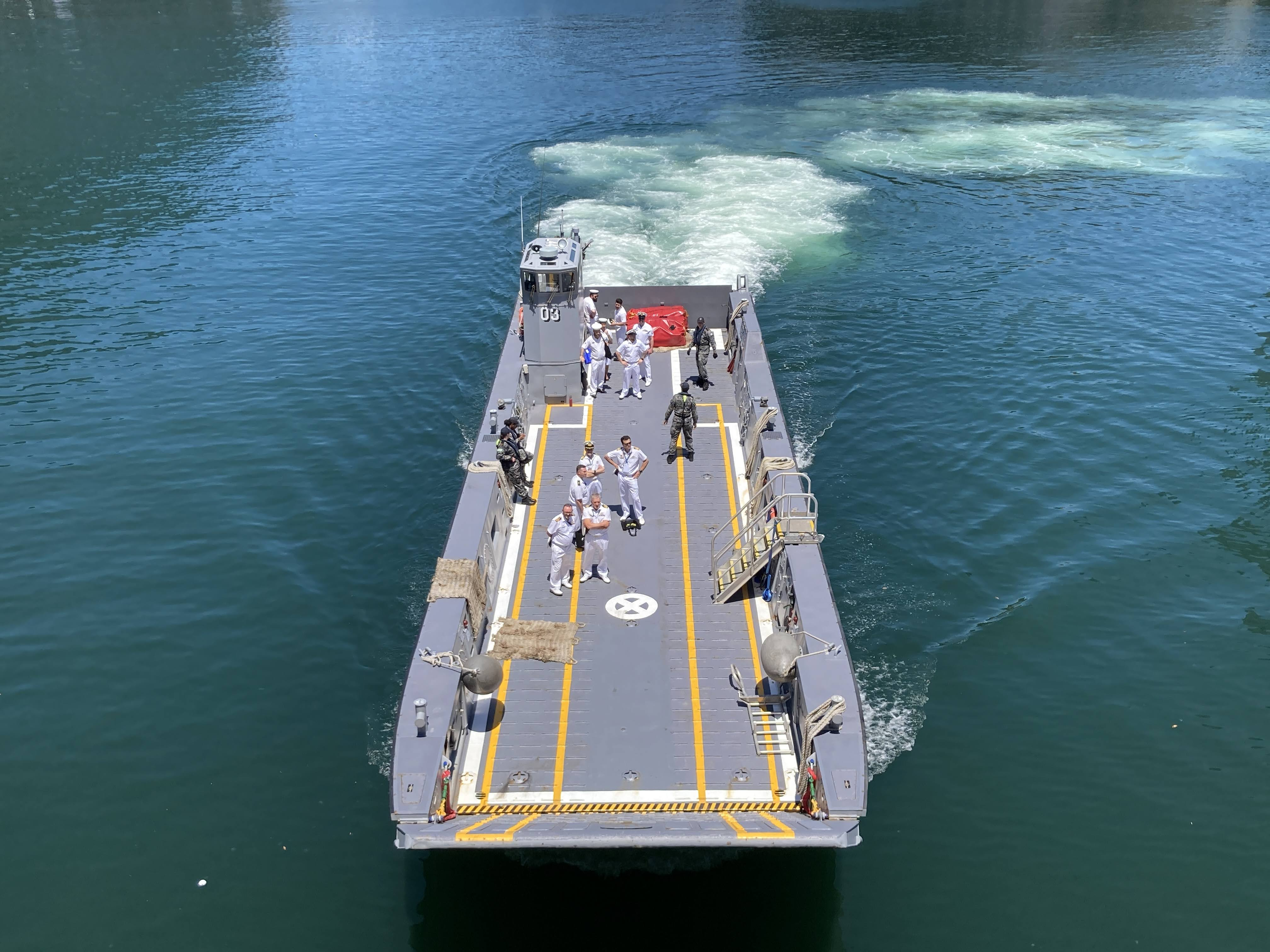
An Australian LLC viewed from above

In 2009, the Australian Defence Force began plans to acquire landing craft for the under-construction Canberra-class landing helicopter dock ships. Arrangements were made to acquire craft from Navantia (the builder responsible for the LHDs), and in September 2011, the purchase of 12 LCM-1E craft was approved by the Australian government. The landing craft were delivered in batches of four: the first batch in May 2014, followed by the second in February 2015, with the third due by mid-2015. In Australian service, the craft are referred to as LLCs (LHD Landing Craft), and six are assigned to each of the Canberra-class ships: four embarked, two assigned to shore facilities for training and trials, and rotated aboard as embarked craft require maintenance.
