= Spanish ship Juan Carlos I =

Amphibious assault ship

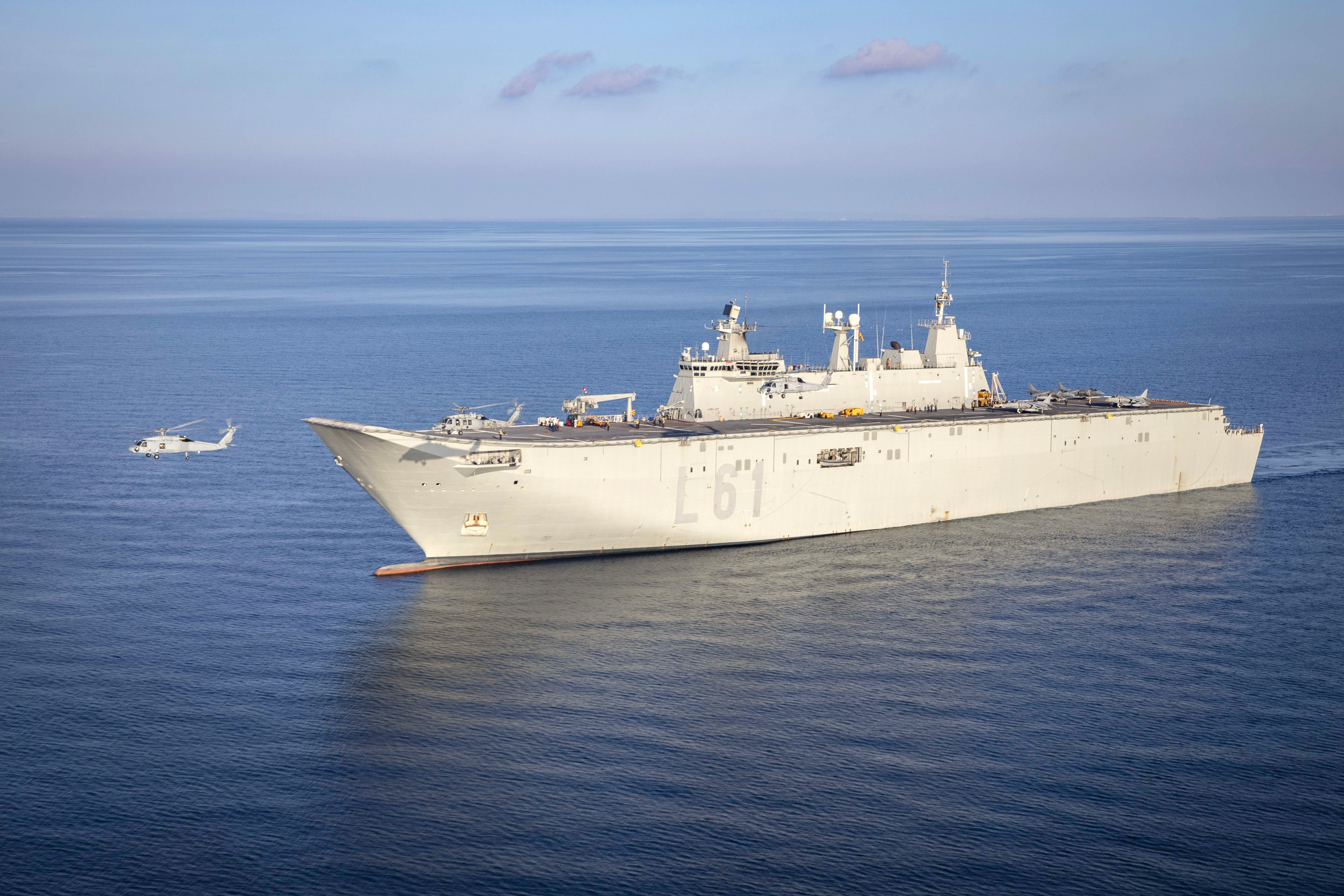
- Juan Carlos I in February 2023

History

Spain
- Name: Juan Carlos I
- Namesake: King Juan Carlos I of Spain
- Ordered: 5 September 2003
- Builder: Navantia
- Cost: €462 million
- Laid down: May 2005
- Launched: 22 September 2009
- Commissioned: 30 September 2010
- Home port: Naval Station Rota, Rota
- Identification: Pennant number: L61
- Status: Active
- Badge

General characteristics
- Class & type: Juan Carlos I class
- Displacement: 26,000 tonnes
- Length: 230.82 m (757 ft 3 in)
- Beam: 32 m (105 ft)
- Draught: 6.9 m (23 ft)
- Propulsion: 2 × 11 MW POD, GE ITP LM2500 + Navantia MAN 16V32/40
- Speed: 21 knots (39 km/h; 24 mph)
- Range: 9,000 nautical miles (17,000 km; 10,000 mi) at 15 knots (28 km/h; 17 mph)
- Boats & landing craft carried: Four LCM-1E
- Capacity: 913 soldiers + up to 46 Leopard 2E tanks
- Complement: Ship's company: 261; Air wing: 172
- Sensors & processing systems: LANZA-N air search, ARIES surface search, PAR aircraft landing; EID ICCS integrated communications control system
- Electronic warfare & decoys: REGULUS and RIGEL
- Armament: 4 × RWS Sentinel 2.0; 4 × 12.7 mm machine guns; 2 x BPDMS (FBNW); 1 x VLS (FBNW)
- Aircraft carried: AV-8B Harrier II, Chinook, Sikorsky SH-60 Seahawk, NH90
- Notes: Aircraft composition: Pure combat: 25 AV-8B/F-35B + 6 flight deck parking spots Mix: 11 AV-8B + 12 NH90 + 6 flight deck parking spots Pure transport: 25 NH90 + 6 flight deck parking spots

Juan Carlos I is a multi-purpose aircraft carrier-landing helicopter dock (LHD) in the Spanish Navy (Armada Española). Similar in role to many aircraft carriers, the amphibious landing ship has a ski jump for STOVL operations, and is equipped with the McDonnell Douglas AV-8B Harrier II attack aircraft. The vessel is named in honour of Juan Carlos I, the former king of Spain.

The vessel plays an important role in the fleet, as a platform that replaces the Newport-class tank landing ships Hernán Cortés and Pizarro for supporting the mobility of the Marines and the strategic transport of other ground forces, and acts as a platform for carrier-based aviation replacing the withdrawn aircraft carrier Príncipe de Asturias.

== Design ==
The design for the Buque de Proyección Estratégica (Strategic Projection Vessel), as it was initially known, was approved in September 2003.

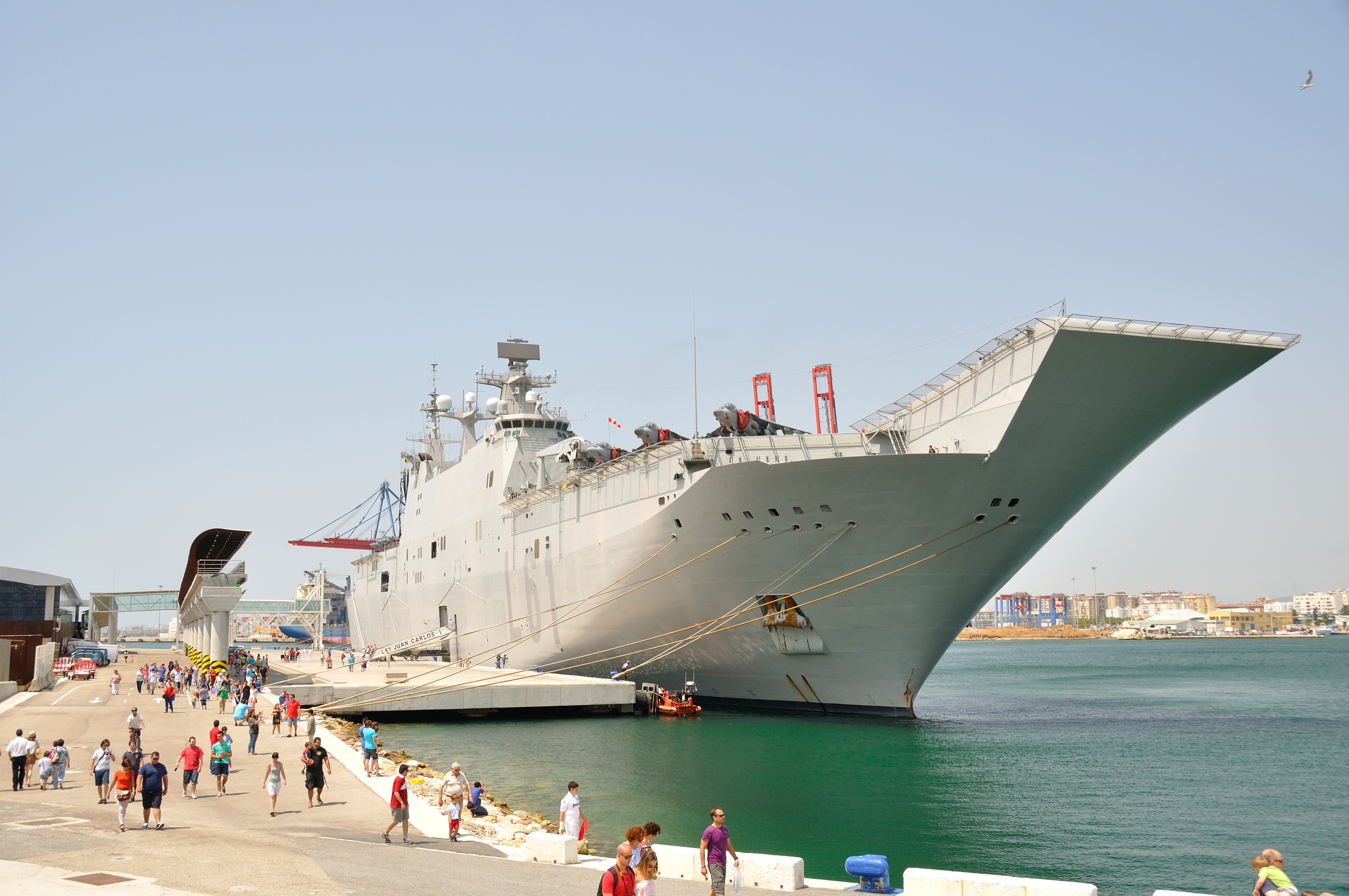
The bow of Juan Carlos I, showing the ship's ski-jump ramp. Málaga, July 2013

The vessel has a flight deck of 202 metres (663 ft), with a ski-jump ramp. The ship's flight deck has eight landing spots for Harrier, F-35 Lightning II or medium-sized helicopters, four spots for heavy helicopters of the CH-47 Chinook or V-22 Osprey size. The ship can carry either 30 helicopters or 10/12 McDonnell Douglas AV-8B Harrier II or Lockheed Martin F-35 Lightning II and 10/12 helicopters, using the light vehicles bay as an additional storage zone.

The ship uses diesel-electric propulsion, simultaneously connecting both diesels and the new technology gas turbine powerplant to a pair of azimuthal pods, for the first time in the Spanish Navy.

The complement of the ship is approximately 900 naval personnel, with equipment and support elements for 1,200 soldiers. Multi-functional garage and hangar space on two levels covers 6,000 m^{2} (65,000 sq ft), with capacity for 6,000 tonnes load on each level. A stern well deck measuring 69.3 by 16.8 m (227 by 55 ft) can accommodate four LCM-1E landing craft which can beach-deliver non-swimming ground vehicles like tanks and four RHIBs, or one Landing Craft Air Cushion plus Assault Amphibious Vehicles.

While the ship has also operated the AV-8B Harrier II fighter aircraft, as of 2025 it was reported that the aircraft would be unlikely to be replaced given that the acquisition of the F-35B fighter has been ruled out by the Spanish government. If confirmed, this means that carrier-based fighter operations on Juan Carlos I will cease in around 2030.

== Construction ==
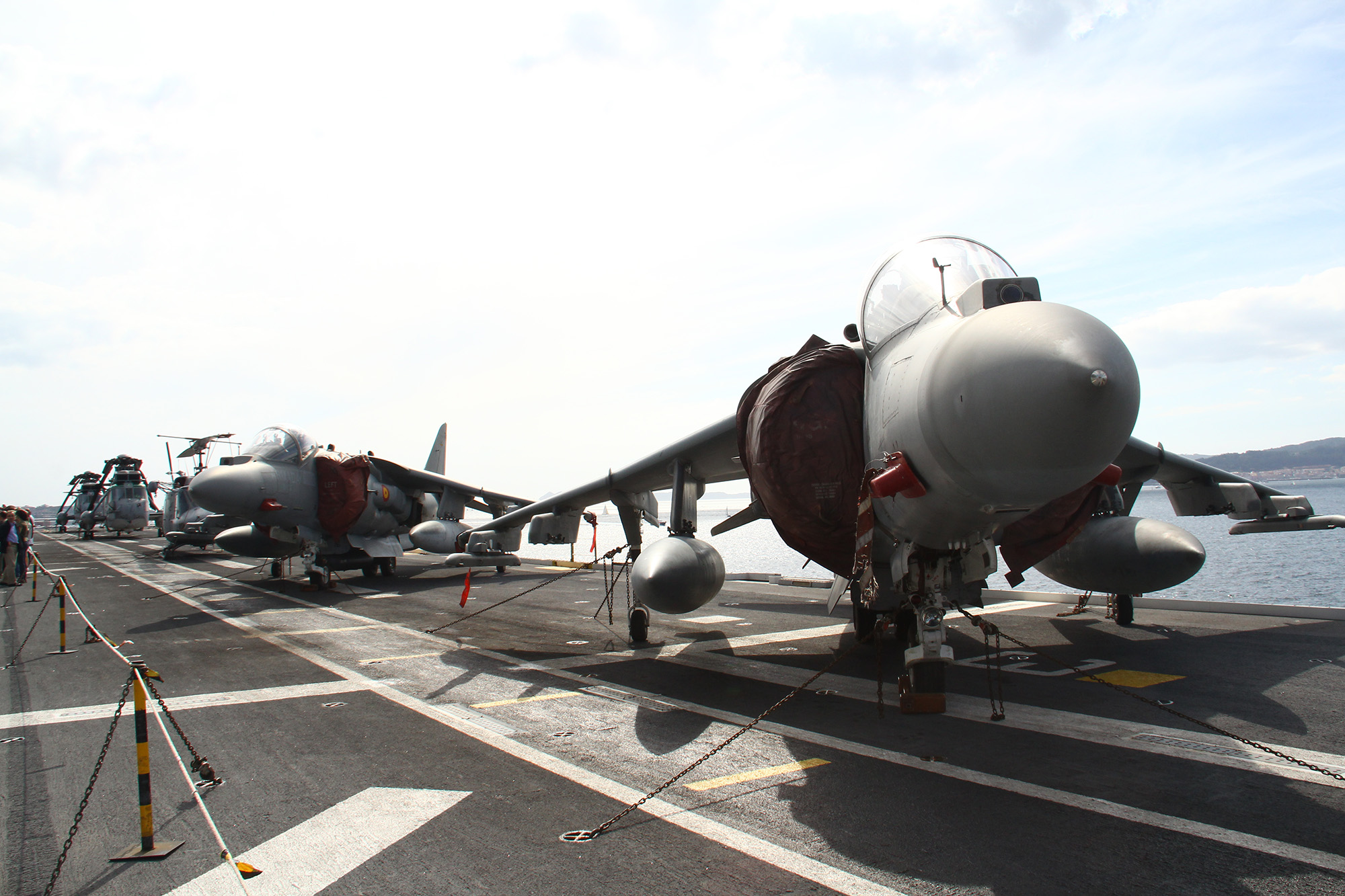
Harrier II and helicopters on board

Construction of the 231 m (758 ft), 27,000-tonne ship started in May 2005 simultaneously at the Navantia Shipyards in Ferrol, Galicia (with the cut of the first plate corresponding to Block 320) and in Fene, Galicia (with the cut of the first plate corresponding to Block 330). The ship, that supposes a service load of 3,100,000 hours of production and 775,000 hours of engineering, was launched 10 March 2008, and was commissioned 30 September 2010. The original budget was €360 million but the ship cost €462 million (US$600 million) in the end.

== Exports ==
=== Australia ===
In June 2007, following a lengthy contest that pitted it against the similar but smaller French Mistral-class amphibious assault ship, the Australian government announced that it would build under licence two ships of the same design, known as the Canberra-class landing helicopter dock. Navantia was responsible for the ships' construction from the keel to the flight deck in Spain, after which the hulls were transported to Australia for completion by BAE Systems Australia. The first of these ships, HMAS Canberra, was commissioned on 28 November 2014. The second ship, HMAS Adelaide, was commissioned on 4 December 2015.

=== Russia ===
In September 2009, Russia invited Navantia to take part in a competition to supply the Russian Navy with a new generation of amphibious assault ships, competing against the French Mistral-class ships. In January 2011, Russia chose the Mistral proposal over the Spanish concept.

== Licensing ==
=== Turkey ===
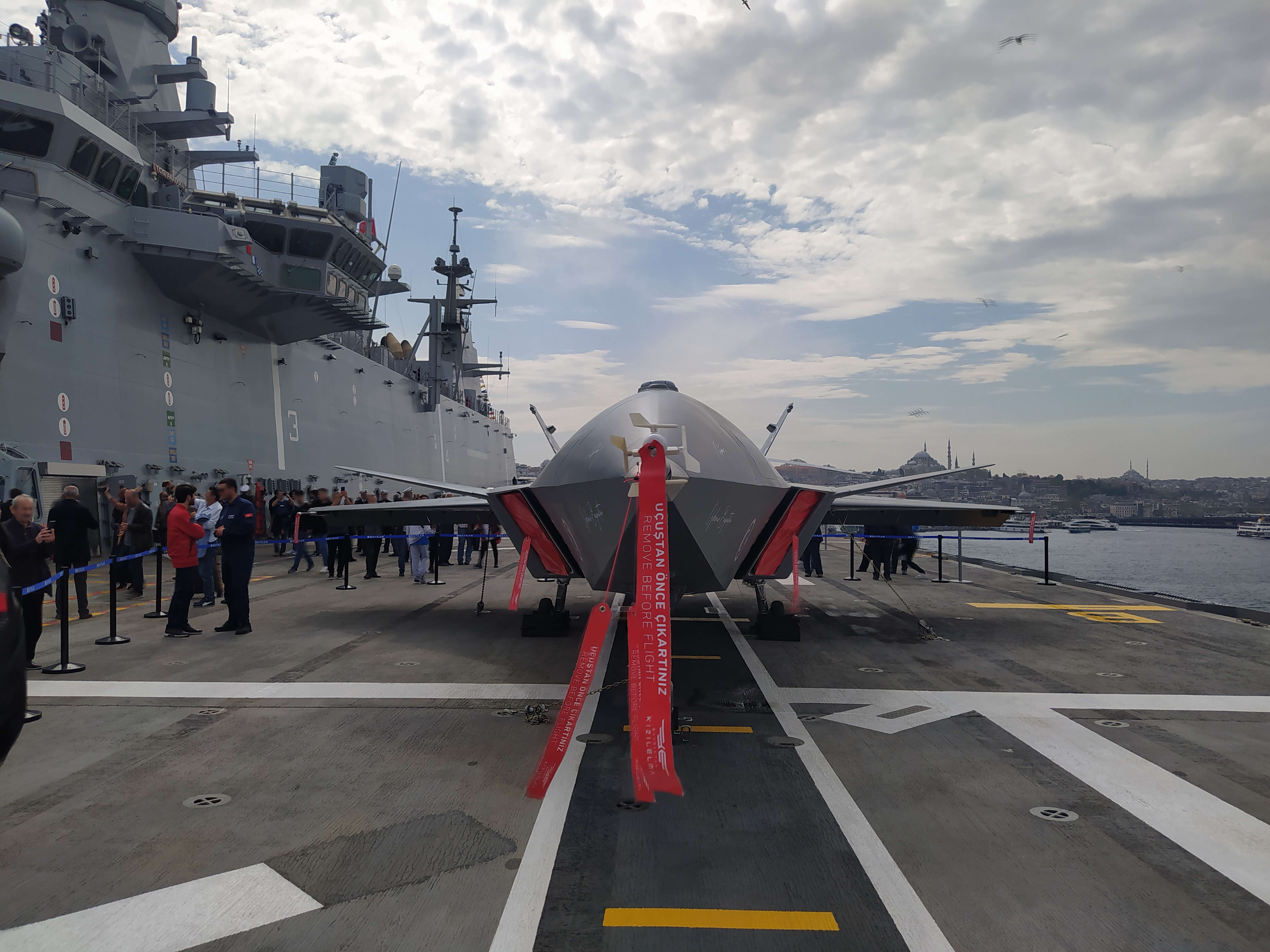
TCG Anadolu of the Turkish Navy at the Golden Horn in Istanbul. Baykar MIUS Kızılelma is a jet-engined UCAV designed to operate on TCG Anadolu. Its maiden flight took place on 14 December 2022. TCG Anadolu was commissioned on 10 April 2023.

Navantia provided design, technology transfer, equipment and technical assistance to Turkey's Sedef Shipyard for the design and production of TCG Anadolu, a modified Turkish derivative of the Juan Carlos class, classified as a "Light Aircraft Carrier" by Turkish Lloyd. It features local command and control systems; and the combat management system of the ship ADVENT is integrated by HAVELSAN. In December 2013, the Turkish Navy's amphibious assault ship program was estimated to cost €375 million (US$500 million), however the total was near US$650 million when the ship entered service.

Originally, the Turkish Navy wanted a slightly shorter flight deck without the forward ski-jump ramp, optimized for helicopter-only use. The navy later opted for a fully equipped flight deck with the ski-jump after deciding to purchase Lockheed Martin F-35B STOVL aircraft. Turkey was a Level 3 partner in the Joint Strike Fighter program and the Turkish Air Force was to get the F-35A CTOL version. On 17 July 2019, the US removed Turkey from the F-35 program for purchasing the Russian S-400 missile system.

The Turkish version is capable of operating up to 10 helicopters on deck in "light aircraft carrier" configuration. The final design's dimensions are: 232 m (761 ft) (length), 32 m (105 ft) (beam), 6.9 m (23 ft) (draught), and 58 m (190 ft) (height). Its displacement is 24,660 metric tons (in "light aircraft carrier" mission configuration) or 27,436 metric tons (in "amphibious landing ship" mission configuration). Its maximum speed is 21.5 knots (39.8 km/h; 24.7 mph) (in "light aircraft carrier" configuration) or 29 knots (54 km/h; 33 mph) (in "amphibious landing ship" configuration).

Its maximum range is 9,000 nautical miles (17,000 km; 10,000 mi) when travelling at an economical speed. It has a 5,440 m^{2} (58,600 sq ft) flight deck and a 990 m^{2} (10,700 sq ft) aviation hangar which can accommodate either twelve medium-sized helicopters or eight CH-47F Chinook heavy-lift helicopters. When the aviation hangar and the light cargo garage are unified, up to 25 medium-sized helicopters can be carried, or up to twelve helicopters and twelve F-35 fighters. Six more helicopters can be hosted on the flight deck.

The ship has a 1,880 m^{2} (20,200 sq ft) light cargo garage for TEU containers and 27 Amphibious Assault Vehicles (AAV); a 1,165 m^{2} (12,540 sq ft) dock which can host four Landing Craft Mechanized (LCM) or two Landing Craft Air Cushion (LCAC), or two Landing Craft Vehicle Personnel (LCVP); and a 1,410 m^{2} (15,200 sq ft) garage for heavy loads, which can host 29 Main Battle Tanks (MBT), Amphibious Assault Vehicles and TEU containers. The crew consists of 261 personnel: 30 officers, 49 NCOs, 59 leading seamen and 123 ratings.

The final contract for the ship's construction was signed with the Navantia-Sedef consortium on 7 May 2015. While the commissioning of the ship was scheduled for 2021 in the beginning, it entered service on 10 May 2023. The estimated cost according to the final specifications was $1 billion in 2015. Construction began on 30 April 2016 at the shipyard of Sedef Shipbuilding Inc. in Istanbul.

The construction of an identical sister ship, to be named TCG Trakya, is currently planned.

== Ships ==
Name	Pennant no.	Laid down	Launched	Commissioned	Status
Spanish Navy
Juan Carlos I	L61	May 2005	22 September 2009	30 September 2010	In service
Royal Australian Navy — Canberra class
Canberra	L02	23 September 2009	17 February 2011	28 November 2014	In service
Adelaide	L01	18 February 2011	4 July 2012	4 December 2015	In service
Turkish Navy — Anadolu class
Anadolu	L-400	7 February 2018	30 April 2019	10 April 2023	In service
Trakya	Planned				

== See also ==
- List of aircraft carriers in service

Equivalent amphibious warfare ships of the same era

- Trieste class
- Canberra class
- America class
- Anadolu class
- Type 075
- Project 23900

== Bibliography ==
- Warship International Staff (2007). "Launch of the Spanish Aircraft Carrier Juan Carlos I". Warship International. XLIV (4): 362–363. ISSN 0043-0374.
