= LCM2000-class landing craft =

Class overview
- Builders: Australian Defence Industries, Carrington
- Operators: Australian Army
- Cost: A$5.3 million each
- Built: 2003–2005
- Completed: 6
- Retired: 6

General characteristics
- Type: Landing Craft Mechanised
- Displacement: 135 tons full load
- Length: 25.4 m (83 ft)
- Beam: 7.6 m (25 ft)
- Draught: 1.0 m (3.3 ft)
- Ramps: Bow and stern ramps
- Propulsion: Two Detroit 6062 diesels; Two Doen waterjets
- Speed: 11.5 knots (21.3 km/h)
- Range: Over 700 nautical miles (1,300 km)
- Capacity: 35 to 50 tons, equivalent to one Leopard 1 tank or five armoured vehicles
- Crew: Up to 5
- Armament: Two 12.7mm HMGs
- Notes: Ship characteristics from, and

The LCM2000 was a class of Landing Craft Mechanised (LCM) built for the Australian Army by Australian Defence Industries (ADI) (now Thales Australia). The LCMs were ordered in 2001 and the first craft was originally scheduled to enter service with the Army in 2003. They were intended to operate from the Royal Australian Navy's Kanimbla class landing platform amphibious.

The Army accepted all six LCM2000s in 2005. It was found that they were too large to be safely carried on the bow of the Kanimbla class ships. The craft also had structural problems that needed to be rectified. As a result the LCM2000s were only used for training and minor exercises. The project was cancelled in February 2011 and the craft were disposed of.

== Design ==
In 1997 the Australian Government approved a project to build six amphibious watercraft to operate from the Royal Australian Navy's two Kanimbla class landing platform amphibious (LPA). These craft were to be operated by the Australian Army and would replace its LCM-8s. In October 2001 ADI was selected as the preferred tenderer to build the six watercraft; at this time it was intended that the first of the class would enter service in 2003. As part of its tender, ADI claimed that the landing craft would be 60 percent more efficient when landing a battalion group than the LCM-8s as their design included bow and stern ramps to expedite loading and unloading.

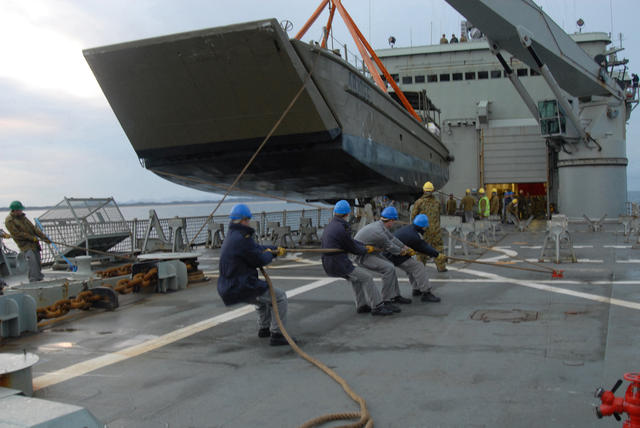
An Australian Army LCM-8 being positioned on the bow of a Kanimbla class landing platform amphibious. The LCM2000-class craft were intended to also be carried on the bows of these ships.

A contract for the craft was signed in July 2002 and construction work began at ADI's facilities at Carrington, New South Wales in February 2003. The sixth LCM2000 was completed in August 2005, though at the time there were plans to order further craft. The six LCMs were named AB 2000, AB 2001, AB 2002, AB 2003, AB 2004 and AB 2005.

The LCM2000s were designed by ADI and were intended to be compatible with the LPAs. The craft were to be capable of mating with the stern of LPAs in order to transfer vehicles to and from the ships. Two LCM2000s were to be carried on the bow of each LPA, with the craft being lifted out of the water by the amphibious ships' 70 ton crane. The final design was for a 25.2 metres (83 ft)-long vessel constructed from aluminium with a maximum displacement of 135 tonnes when fully loaded. The craft were powered by two diesel engines and two water jets which generated a maximum speed of 11.5 knots (21.3 km/h) when unladen and 9.5 knots (17.6 km/h) fully loaded. The LCM2000s were to carry loads ranging from 35 to 50 tons, including one Leopard 1 tank or up to five ASLAVs; this was three times the cargo which could be embarked in the LCM-8s.

== Service and disposal ==
The LCM 2000s were accepted into service with the Army in December 2005. It was planned that the craft would be operated by the 10th Force Support Battalion from its base at Townsville, Queensland. However, trials conducted with the LPAs found that the craft were too wide for personnel to safely move past when they were embarked. As a result, the LCM2000s were only used for training purposes and minor exercises conducted near Townsville, Darwin and other locations in northern Australia. This meant that they spent most of their careers laid up at the Rosshaven marina in Townsville. These trials and training activities were suspended for a period commencing August 2007 while structural issues were rectified. The Army hoped to either use the LCM2000s with the RAN's Canberra class landing helicopter dock when these ships entered service or for other secondary tasks, but the craft were determined to be unsuitable for these purposes.

On 15 October 2010 the project to bring the LCM2000s into service was placed on the Australian Government's defence 'projects of concern' list. On 1 February 2011 the Government announced that the LCM2000 project had been cancelled and the craft would be disposed of. In his media release, the Minister for Defence Materiel stated that "the dimensions and weight of the watercraft meant they were unsuitable to be launched from these ships [the Kanimbla class] and are not fit for alternative Australian Defence Force use" as the main reasons for the project's cancellation. The Minister for Defence also stated that the project had cost A$40 million and it "was not a project which Defence covered itself in glory". The craft were reported to still be laid up at the Rosshaven marine yard in January 2012, but the Government listed them for disposal the next month. In 2022 one of the craft was listed for sale online, with its location being given as a "freshwater lake in Southern New Zealand".

A new project to replace the Army's LCM-8 landing craft was initiated in early 2021.
