= Navantia =

Spanish state-owned shipbuilding company

Navantia, S.A.
- Type: State-owned enterprise
- Industry: Arms Industry, Shipbuilding, Engineering
- Predecessor: Empresa Nacional Bazán
- Founded: January 1, 2005; 21 years ago
- Headquarters: Madrid, Community of Madrid, Spain
- Area served: Worldwide
- Key people: Ricardo Domínguez García-Baquero (president)
- Products: Warships, hospital ships, yachts, ferries, cargo ships, platform supply vessels, dredgers, marine propulsion, offshore engineering
- Revenue: ▲€1.98 billion (2025)
- Operating income: ▼ (€171.7 million) (2025)
- Net income: ▼ (€148.9 million) (2025)
- Total assets: ▲€7.2 billion (2025)
- Number of employees: 6,761 (2025)
- Parent: SEPI
- Divisions: Navantia Sistemas
- Subsidiaries: Navantia Australia; Navantia Arabia; Navantia UK (Harland & Wolff); SAES Capital; Sainsel Sistemas Navales
- Website: www.navantia.es

Navantia, S.A. is a Spanish state-owned shipbuilding enterprise dedicated to civil and military naval construction, the design of deep-tech systems and the manufacture of structures for the renewable energy sector, such as offshore wind or hydrogen.

It was established in 2005 following the segregation of the military assets of the IZAR Group. The company designs, builds, and supports different types of surface vessels, submarines, and systems. It directly employs nearly 5,000 workers distributed among its operating centers in Ferrol, Cádiz, Cartagena and Madrid. Following the acquisition of Harland & Wolff, Navantia employs around 1,000 people in the United Kingdom and has shipyards in Belfast, Arnish, Appledore and Methil.

Navantia is the fifth-largest shipbuilder in Europe and the ninth-largest in the world. The company is also expanding into markets such as renewable energy, the offshore industry and naval services.

== Company ==
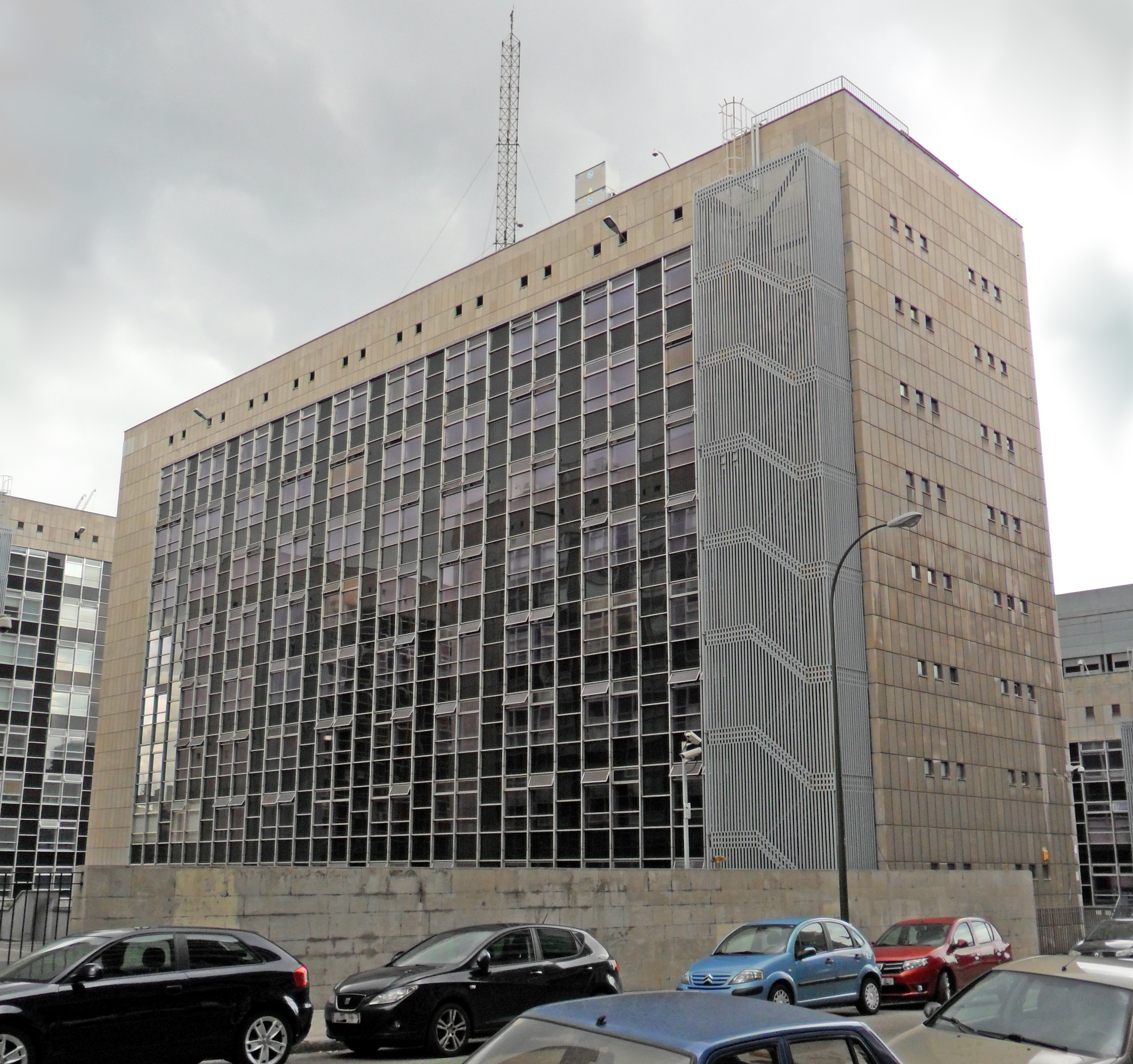
Navantia‘s headquarters in Madrid

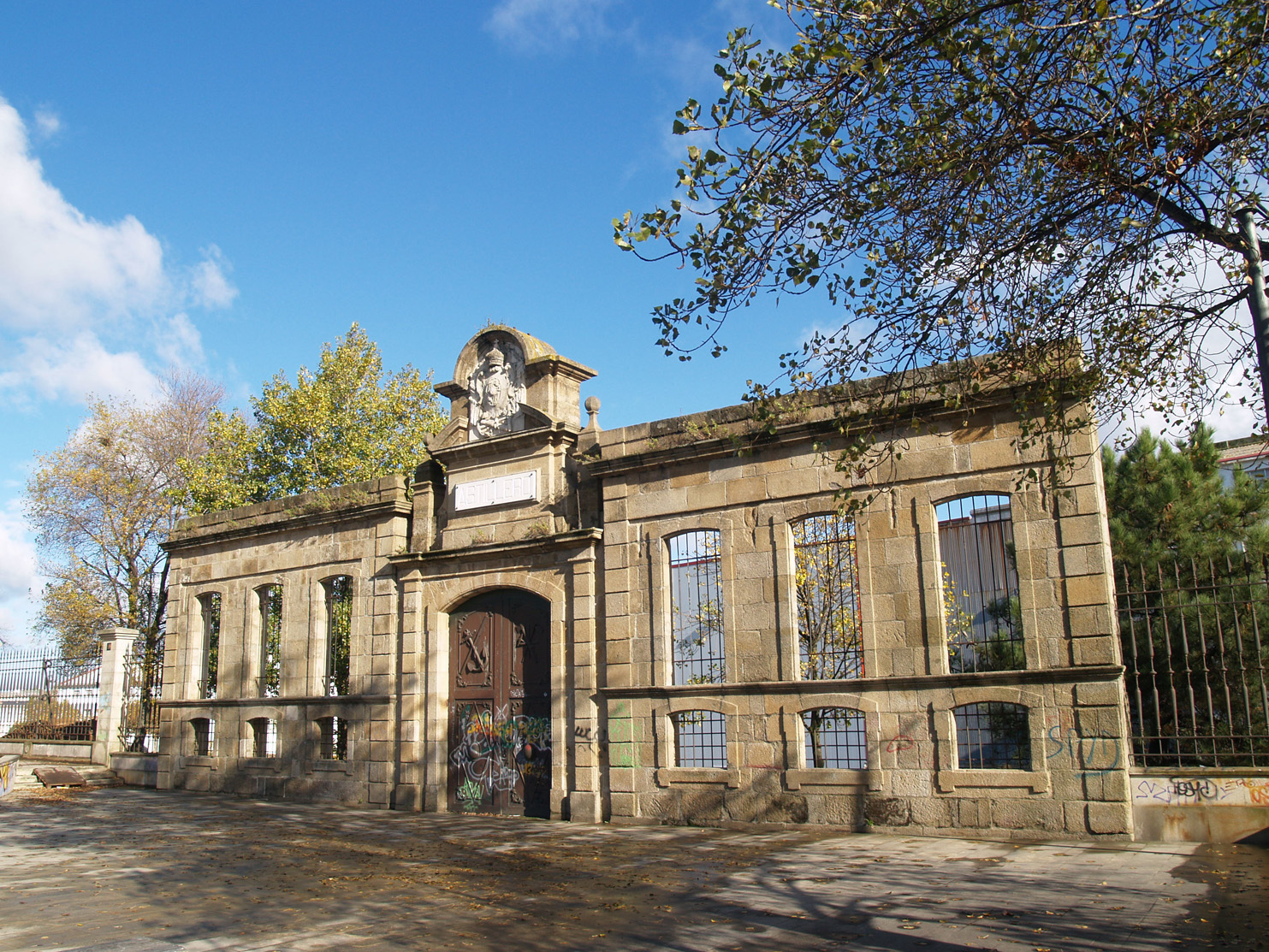
One of the 18th-century doors of the shipyards in Ferrol

The origins of Navantia go back to the beginnings of Spanish naval construction in the 13th century with the Real Atarazanas de Sevilla and the Real Carenero of San Fernando. Ships made in these yards played a key role in the discovery of America, but demand for larger ships with greater drafts meant that navy ship production was moved to Arsenal de Ferrol (La Coruña), Arsenal de Cartagena (Murcia), and La Carraca, (Cádiz) under reforms introduced by the Marques de la Ensenada and Jorge Juan in the eighteenth century.

These shipyards became part of the Spanish Naval Construction Society (La Naval) where civil shipyards such as Matagorda in Puerto Real (Cádiz) or Sestao (Vizcaya) also belonged. The state took over the military arsenals at the end of the Spanish Civil War and formed the Empresa Nacional Bazán in 1947 to build ships using foreign technology. Bazán later began to develop its own ship projects.

IZAR was formed in 2000 following a merger between Astilleros Españoles, a company that brought together publicly-owned civil shipyards, and the Empresa Nacional Bazán. To achieve greater efficiency, the Sociedad Estatal de Participaciones Industriales (SEPI), the largest shareholder and manager of the IZAR group, separated the military branch in December 2004 and subsequently formed Navantia in March 2005. The civil operations were later also transferred to Navantia. The company is 100% owned by SEPI, the Spanish state-owned industrial holding group, and it designs, builds, repairs, and modernizes military and civilian vessels.

In March 2016, Navantia was selected as the 'preferred bidder' for two logistics support ships for the Royal Australian Navy. In April 2021, Navantia launched its first completely Spanish designed and built submarine, S-80 Plus-class Isaac Peral. This was 133 years after the launch of the world's first functional military submarine, Peral.

== Location ==
Navantia has locations throughout Spain and the United Kingdom.

The company's headquarters are in Madrid and production centers are in:

- Bay of Cádiz:
  - Arsenal de La Carraca in San Fernando (Cádiz).
  - Puerto Real shipyard, in Puerto Real (Cádiz).
  - Cádiz shipyard
  - Naval Station Rota (Cádiz).
  - Navantia Training Center in San Fernando.
- Bay of Ferrol:
  - Ferrol shipyard (La Coruña)
  - Fene shipyard (La Coruña)
- Astillero de Cartagena (Murcia)

Having acquired Harland & Wolff in January 2025, it also owns sites in Belfast, Appledore and two sites in Scotland.

== Products ==
Navantia's activities can be divided into four main sectors: naval defense (the historical core of the group's business and including ships, submarines, and management of the operational availability of forces); systems (research, development, and integration of defense, surveillance, and navigation systems); diversification (renewable marine energy, construction of naval bases and power plants, and offshore installations); and services (maintenance, repair, and life cycle support).

=== Surface defense ===
- Multi-mission frigates and destroyers: F100 / F110 / F310 / AWD HOBART / ALFA 3000 / ALFA 4000.
- Aircraft carrier / multi-mission LHD: ATHLAS 26000.
- LPD: ATHLAS 13000.
- LCM: Arena 65.
- Ocean patrol and corvettes: Avante 300 / AVANTE 1400 / 1800 Combatant / 2200 Combatant / AVANTE 3000 / AVANTE 2200 Patrol.
- AOR: Based in the AOR Cantabria design.
- AOE with amphibious capabilities: Joint Support Ship (JSS)

=== Submarine defense ===
- Submarine: S-80 Plus

=== Propulsion ===
- Turbines: Navantia manufactures naval steam turbines and equipment (such as reduction gears, rudders, shaft lines, and torpedo tubes) for both the civil and military markets. The Navatia turbine factory installed the first propulsion plant on a ship in 1912 and since then has worked independently in collaboration with world-class technologists such as General Electric, Mitsubishi Hitachi PS, Siemens, and Schelde Gears. Its product catalog includes:
  - Equipment such as reduction gears, shaft lines, rudders, and gas turbine encapsulation.
  - Steam turbines licensed by Mitsubishi Hitachi Power Systems in an approximate power ranges of 2 to 15 MW for co-generation plants, biomass, and other industrial applications
  - Components and / or steam turbines in a variety of power ranges with different technologists
  - Life cycle support that includes repair and / or maintenance, technical assistance, optimization of equipment, and spare parts. Navantia has participated in the manufacture and commissioning of steam turbines for power generation plants in Spain, such as nuclear and thermal plants, co-generation and biomass plants, as well as other industrial applications.
- Engines: Navantia has manufactured high and medium speed four-stroke diesel engines since 1947, and is present in a wide range of naval and land application markets. Its product catalog includes:
  - Propulsion equipment for numerous types of ships
  - Land propulsion equipment for military vehicles
  - Generating sets for numerous types of ships
  - Generating groups for all types of ground applications
  - After-sales service (technical assistance, maintenance, and spare parts)
  - Training courses for clients in the operation and maintenance of equipment. The Navantia motor factory has modern facilities (including induction furnaces, CNC machines, more than 5000 square meters of assembly, test benches of up to 10,000 kW) and works with license and technology cooperation agreements with the main companies in the sector, including MAN Diesel Turbo, MTU Friedrischafen, and Caterpillar. Navantia has carried out the re-motorization of the M-60 and AMX-30 battle tanks for the Spanish Army. It also supplies propulsion equipment for Leopard tanks and Pizarro cavalry vehicles.

=== Offshore ===
Navantia is increasingly diversifying into the offshore sector, especially in wind energy.

== Major projects ==
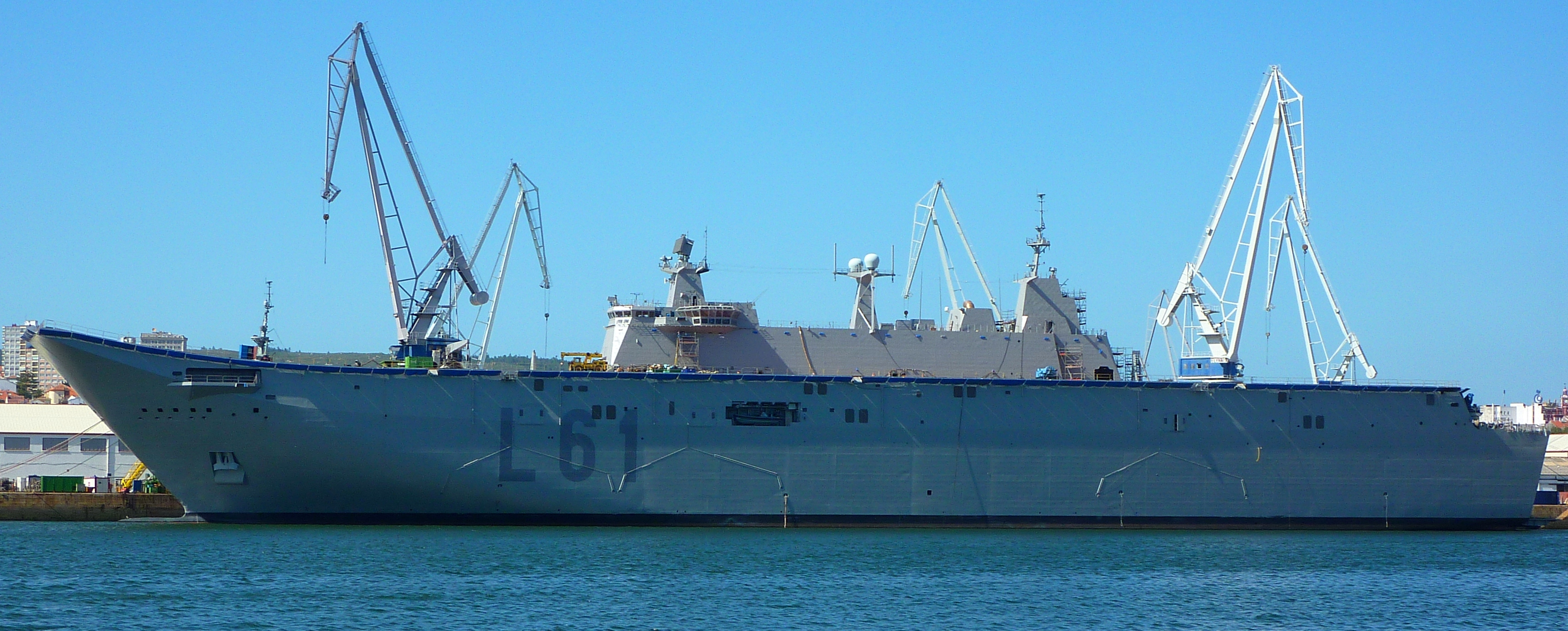
Spanish Navy LHD Juan Carlos I during afloat completion stage

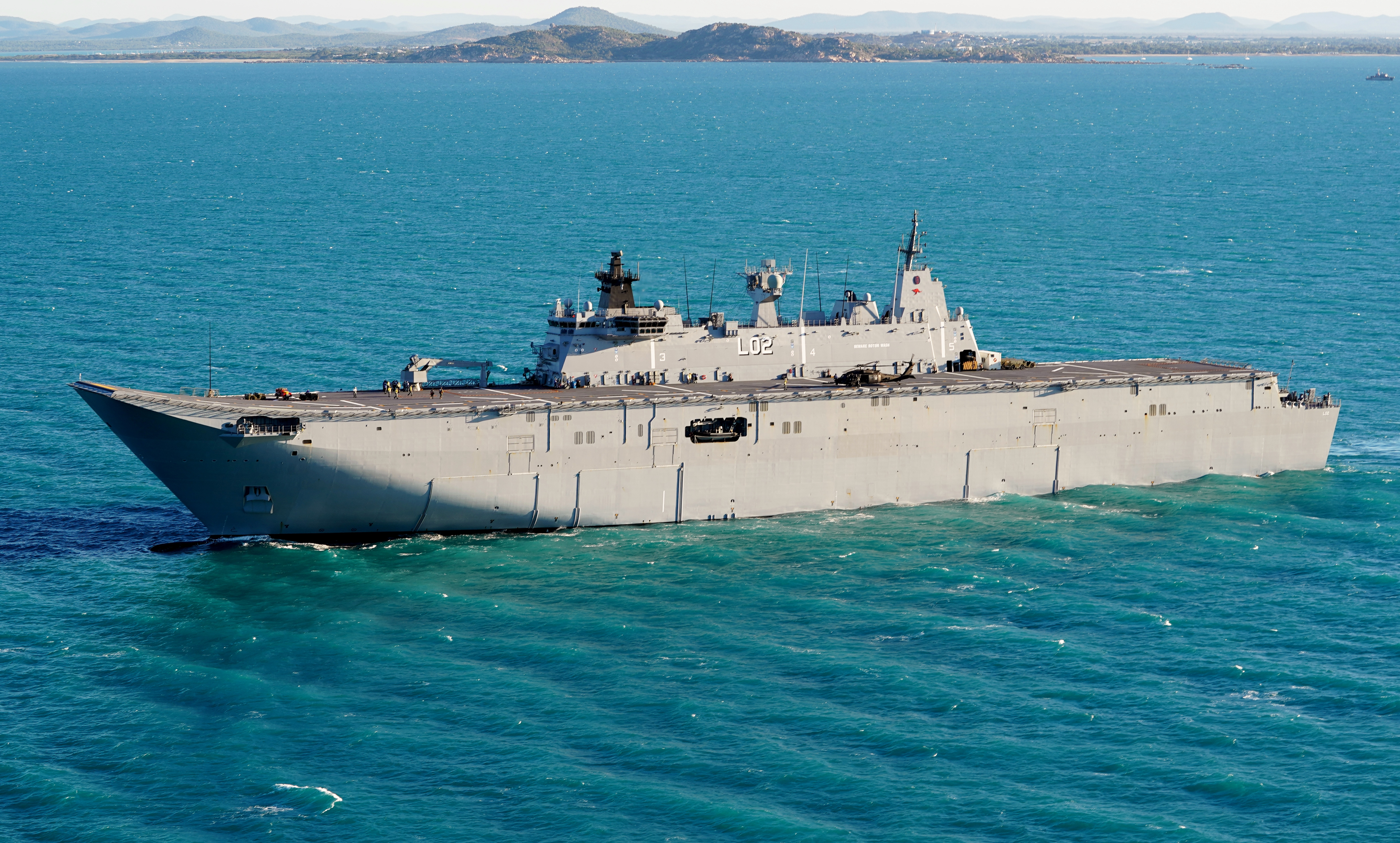
Royal Australian Navy flagship HMAS Canberra in 2021

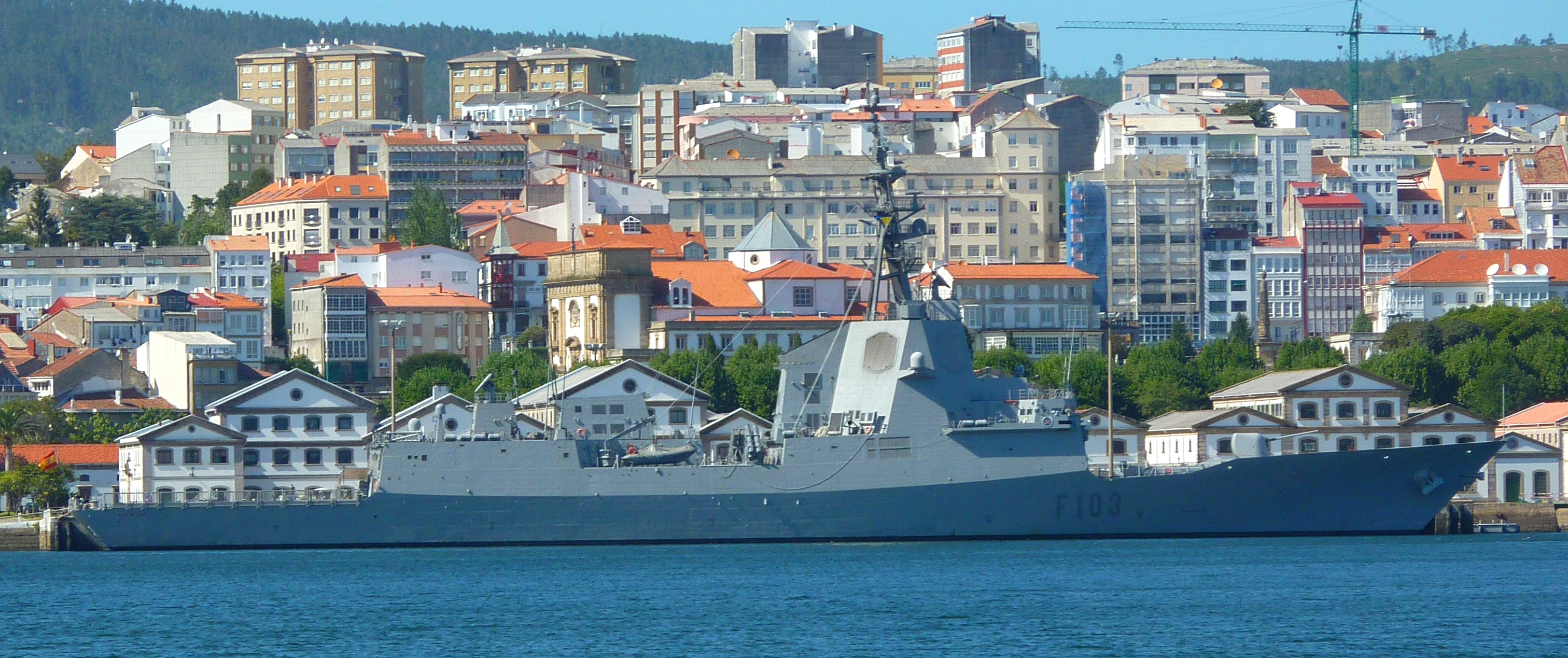
Navantia's F-103 AEGIS frigate Blas de Lezo from the Spanish Navy (2009)

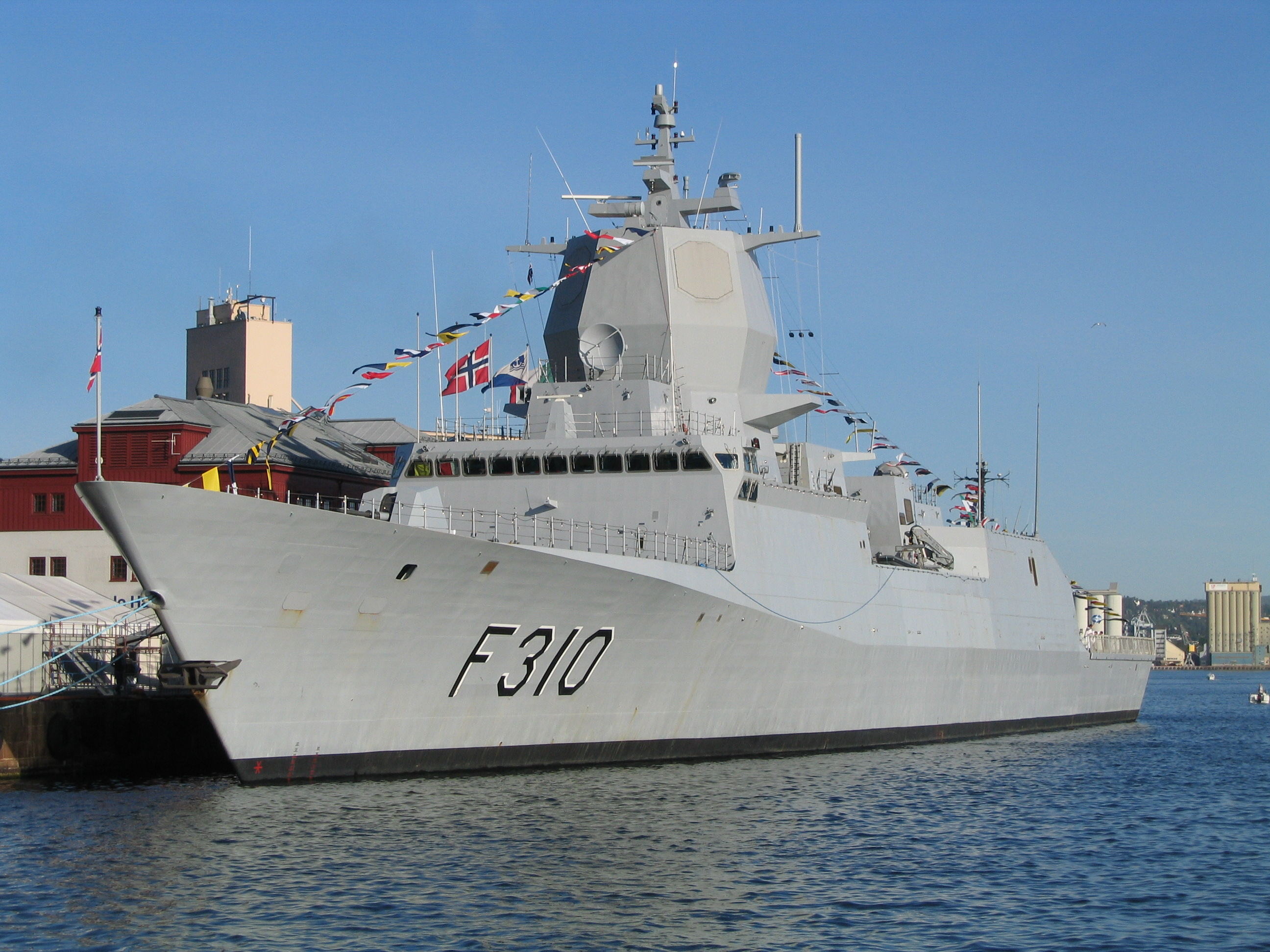
The frigate HNoMS Fridtjof Nansen of the Royal Norwegian Navy in Oslo (2006)

- CARRIERS
  - Príncipe de Asturias carrier (commissioned 1988)
  - HTMS Chakri Naruebet (1997)
- AMPHIBIOUS ASSAULT SHIPS
  - Juan Carlos I-class light aircraft-carrier (2010)
  - Canberra-class LHD (2014)
  - Galicia-class LPDs (1998 / 2000)
- AMPHIBIOUS LANDING CRAFTS
  - LCM-1E
- SUPPLY SHIPS
  - Cantabria replenishment oiler (2010)
  - Patiño replenishment oiler (1995)
  - Supply-class replenishment oiler (2017–21)
- FRIGATES (with AEGIS)
  - F-100 Álvaro de Bazán-class frigate (2002–12)
  - F-310 Fridtjof Nansen class (2006–11)
  - Hobart-class destroyer (2016–19)
- CORVETTES
  - AEGIS corvette
  - Al Jubail-class corvette (2019-2024)
- PATROL SHIPS
  - BAM ocean patrol vessels (Spain, 2011–12)
  - Guaiquerí-class patrol boat (Venezuela, 2011–12)
  - Guaicamacuto-class patrol boat (Venezuela, 2010–11)
  - Attack patrol ships (44 m, 47 m, 63 m)
  - Oceanic & coast patrol ships (79 m, 99 m)
  - Mantilla-class patrol vessel (Argentina, 1982–83)
  - Uribe-class patrol vessel (Mexico, 1982–83)
- SUBMARINES
  - Scorpène-class submarine - joint venture with DCNS for export
  - Isaac Peral-class submarines (S-80 PLUS)
- Minehunter ships (Segura class)
- Oceanographic ships ()
- Combat and control systems
- Propulsion and energy generation systems
- Ship repair and conversions

== See also ==
- Astilleros y Talleres del Noroeste
- Ferrol, Galicia
- Fene
