= LCM-8 =

United States Navy landing craft

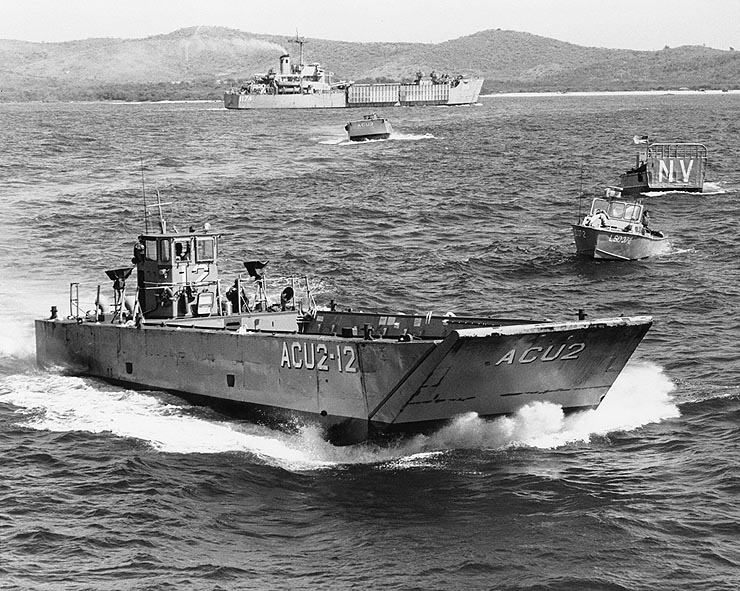
- LCM-8 in March 1972

Class overview
- Name: LCM-8
- In service: 1959 to present

General characteristics
- Type: Mechanized landing craft
- Displacement: 57.8 long tons (58.7 t) light; 111.4 long tons (113.2 t) loaded
- Length: 73 ft 7/12 in (22.265 m)
- Beam: 21 ft 0 in (6.4 m)
- Draft: 4 ft 7/12 in (1.234 m) light; 5 ft 3 in (1.60 m) loaded
- Propulsion: (original) 4, 2-twin-pak GMC 6-71 or Gray Marine 6-71 diesel paired to 2 hydrostatic transmissions Detroit 12V-71 diesel engines, twin screws
- Speed: 12 knots (22 km/h) light; 9 knots (17 km/h) loaded
- Capacity: M48 Patton, M60 tank or 200 troops
- Complement: 4–6
- Armament: 2 × .50 caliber M2 Browning machine guns

The LCM-8 ("Mike Boat") is a river boat and mechanized landing craft used by the United States Navy and Army during the Vietnam War and subsequent operations. They are currently used by governments and private organizations throughout the world. The acronym stands for "Landing Craft Mechanized, Mark 8". (The "Mike Boat" term refers to the military phonetic alphabet, LCM being "Lima Charlie Mike".)

The vessel weighs 135,000 pounds (61,200 kg) and has a crew of four: a Boatswain's Mate petty officer, an Engineman petty officer, a non-rated fireman, and a seaman. US Army specifications call for a crew of six during 24-hour operations: two coxswains, two seamen and two enginemen. The LCM-8s are constructed from welded steel and powered by four 6-71 or two 12V71 diesel engines, twin propellers, and rudders. The ship can carry 60 short tons of cargo. It was designed by Marinette Marine Corp. It has a range of 190 miles at 9 knots with a full load.

== Modifications ==
A modified version, the Zippo boat, carries flamethrowers. Another modified version, the LCM-8 Mod 2, was used to fulfill command, personnel, salvage, and firefighting functions. There is also another version with an aluminum hull. This version was carried aboard all of the Charleston class LKA ships, as the steel version was too heavy to be lifted by the ship's 40 ton fore and aft booms, preventing more than two from being lowered (via the two 70 ton fore and aft cargo booms) at one time. They are now mostly carried by pre-positioned ships.

A third modification was as a transport for PBRs (patrol boat, river) from repair stations at Da Nang (YR-71) and Tan My (PBR Mobile Base 1) to outlying points at Cua Viet, and the Cua Dai rivers. PBR main propulsion jet pumps were easily damaged by ocean salt water which necessitated the boats being carried by another craft to their duty stations. These transport LCMs were classed as mini-docks and each had a boat ramp in the well deck. The voids (built-in float chambers under the well deck) would be systematically flooded, allowing the front end of the craft to sink, so a PBR could be floated in or out of the well deck. The pumping mechanism would then be reversed to clear the water out of the voids, restoring the craft to the normal floating position.

A fourth modification was the Army Version for Vietnam Rivers Logistic with a liveaboard cabin and crewed by six men consisting of Coxswain, Assist. Coxswain, Engineer and assistant and two deckhands. All crew could handle the two M2 Browning .50 caliber machine gun turrets and other small arms and were frequently engaged by the Vietcong on the rivers and canals of the Mekong Delta. One unit, an Army Reserve Unit out of St. Petersburg, Florida, was called to active duty in 1968-69 received a Unit Commendation of merit for delivering record tonnage in their 12-month tour.

== US usage ==
They were used by the United States Navy and Army during the Vietnam War. During the Vietnam War, there were two new aluminum LCM-8s on Johnston Island, which carried trucks and cargo between islands, and one being used as a rescue boat. They had the newer fluid shift transmissions, and 2-671's paired up to two props.

In I Corps (the northernmost military district in Vietnam) boats based at Da Nang, Tan My and Cửa Việt had three man crews of various rates and ranks. On US Navy boats, the senior rate was usually a third-class petty officer or above, and the two crewmen could be E-2, E-3 or E-4 ranks (i.e. seaman apprentice, seaman, or petty officer third class). One of the two crewmen was almost always an Engineman and could be an ENFA, ENFN, or an EN3 in rank. The LCM-8s there all had two sets of the twin 6-71 Detroits paired up to a hydro transmission. Two air compressors, port and starboard of the engine sets, provided air pressure to operate the air cylinders that raised and lowered the bow ramp. The air cylinders were below deck in the eighth void from the bow and stretched cables attached to the ramp to raise it. Lowering the ramp was accomplished by releasing the air and allowing gravity to bring the ramp down.

They also saw use during Operation Just Cause in Panama as well as Operation Desert Shield and Operation Desert Storm. Three Army LCM-8s served in the 1992–1993 US mission to Somalia (fictionalized in Christian Bauman's 2002 novel The Ice Beneath You, which is set in part on a US Army LCM-8 near Kismaayo, Somalia), and a platoon of LCM-8s from the 1098th Trans Co. deployed to Port-au-Prince for the Haitian invasion (1994). The United States Army Reserve's 464th Transportation Company assisted the United States Coast Guard in patrolling the Potomac River after the terrorist attacks on September 11, 2001.

Some are currently deployed aboard Maritime Prepositioning ships to facilitate their mission of being able to unload all their cargo while still offshore with no outside assistance.

=== Replacement ===
The US Army plans to replace the LCM-8 with the Maneuver Support Vessel (Light) (MSV(L)). Two dozen boats are planned that will be larger and faster, with a longer range and twice the capacity over Mike Boats. The MSV(L) will be roughly 100 feet (30 m) long, with a draft of less than four feet, a speed of 18 knots and the capacity to carry either an M1 Abrams tank, two Strykers with add-on armor, or four Joint Light Tactical Vehicles. It also may be used in defended waters, being fitted with a subsurface surveillance device, protection from small arms fire, two Common Remotely Operated Weapon Stations, and mitigated detection through reduction of thermal and acoustic signature. Testing of the new vessel is to take place until 2019. In September 2017, Vigor Industrial was awarded a nearly $1 billion contract for the MSV(L), which is planned for completion in 2027.

== Australian service ==
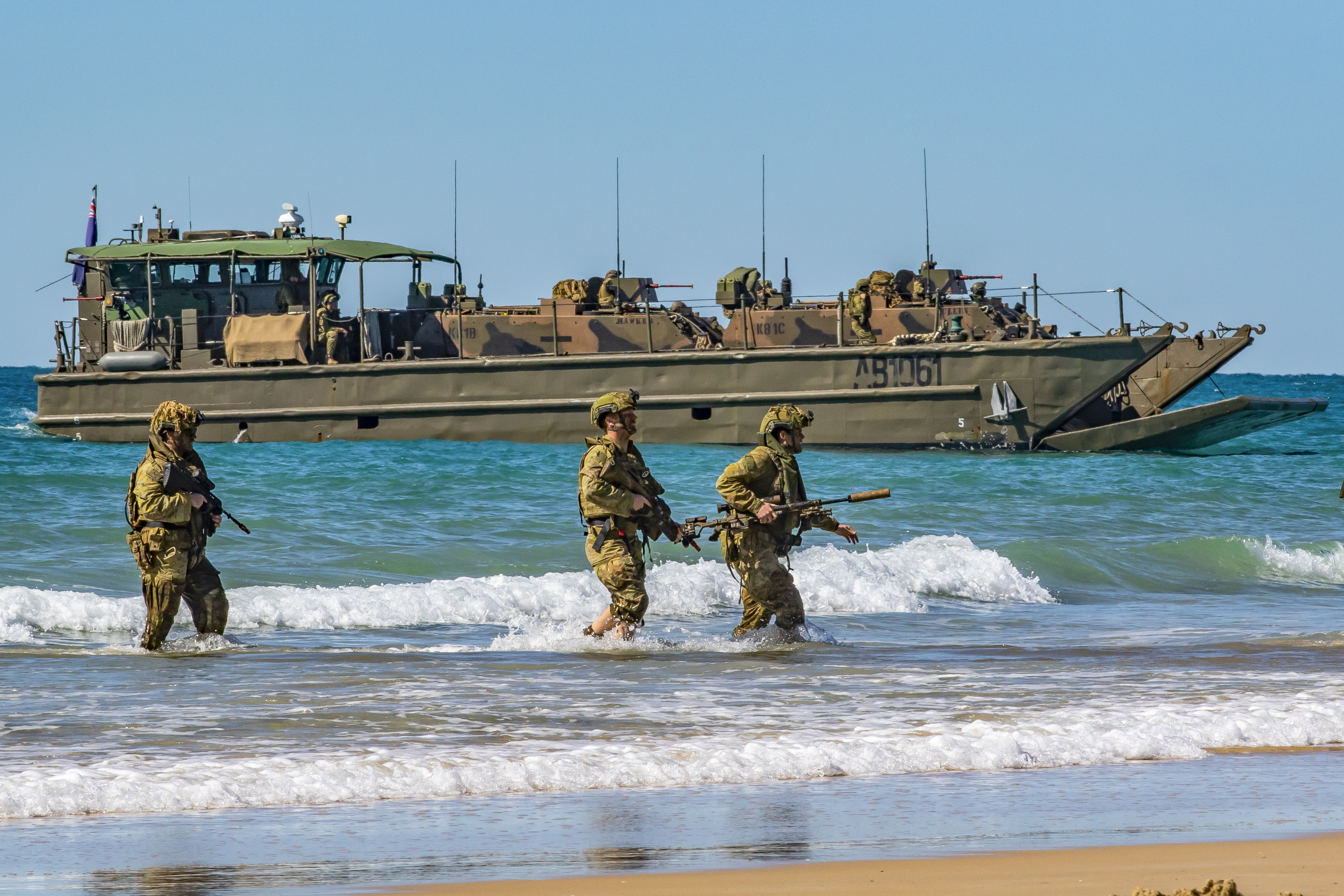
An Australian Army LCM-8 showing the extended wheelhouse of the Australian vessels

The LCM-8 was constructed in Australia for the Australian Army from 1965 to 1967 and again in 1972 using a heavily modified design, crewed (four) and administered by the Royal Australian Corps of Transport and one engineer from the Royal Australian Electrical and Mechanical Engineers (RAEME). The modification of the vessels included an extended enclosed wheelhouse with full galley facilities, chart table and storage space to aid in extended operations beyond the original design parameters. A water purification system allows the vessels to be somewhat independent for longer periods of time. A fully functioning toilet (head) and shower are also installed as part of the wheelhouse extensions; external provision for bedding is also included for the full crew complement.

The extension of the wheelhouse increased rigidity of the craft leading to excessive vibration and cavitation with the original three-blade propeller. Further development included a more balanced and expensive five-blade propeller, negating the vibration and cavitation of the original. The prop change found a few negative effects in the beaching performance of the vessel but over time tactics have been changed to suit the new system.

The vessels are also installed with a full suite of electronics allowing the craft to navigate in all weather, day or night in military operations anywhere in the world with little to no special training requirements for an indefinite period.

During the mid-1990s, the Army LCM-8 received a life of type extension with a re-engine program. The original twin-pac 6-71 two-stroke Detroit Diesel engines and Allison mechanical transmissions were replaced with 8v-92 Silver Series Detroit Diesel engines and Allison Hydraulic Transmissions thus extending the life of the craft for another 20 years.

Two craft were utilized during the invasion of Iraq in 2003, patrolling the shallow waters of the Khawr Abd Allah estuary using HMAS Kanimbla as their base of operations. They were extensively used in East Timor for logistic operations in direct support of multinational peace keepers. Other deployments include peacekeeping and peace monitoring operations in Bougainville and the Solomon Islands.

The LCM-8 fleet of fifteen was to be replaced by six Australian designed type LCM2000 waterjet propelled craft, however these craft were scrapped, after not meeting the required in-service specifications and being deemed not fit for use for the intended Kanimbla-class. The Army will now continue to operate the LCM-8 until 2027. A new project which aims to replace the Army's LCM-8 landing craft was initiated in early 2021.

== Operators ==
- Australia – Australian Army
- Cambodia – Khmer National Navy
- France – French Navy (as the Chaland de transport de matériel)
- Honduras – Honduran Navy
- India – Indian Navy
- Kingdom of Laos – Royal Lao Navy
- Spain – Spanish Marine Corps
- Vietnam – Vietnam Navy
- Thailand – Royal Thai Navy
- Tonga – Tongan Maritime Force (former operator)
- Turkey – Turkish Naval Forces
- United States – U.S. Navy; U.S. Army; National Park Service (Channel Islands National Park, Isle Royale National Park)
