= 817 Squadron RAN =

Defunct flying squadron of the Royal Australian Navy's Fleet Air Arm

- 817 Squadron's crest
- Active: 1941–1945; 1950–2011
- Country: Royal Navy; Royal Australian Navy
- Engagements: Second World War; Korean War; Vietnam War
- Decorations: Meritorious Unit Commendation (United States)

817 Squadron was a naval air squadron of the Fleet Air Arm of the Royal Australian Navy (RAN). It was originally formed as part of the Royal Navy's Fleet Air Arm, as 817 Naval Air Squadron, for service during World War II and took part in combat operations in Norway, North Africa, Sicily and off the coast of France. Following the conclusion of hostilities, the squadron was disbanded in 1945. In 1950, it was re-raised as part of the Royal Australian Navy and subsequently took part in the Korean War. Recent deployments have included Operation Falconer, Operation Slipper and Operation Sumatra Assist. In December 2011, the squadron was disbanded.

== Recent roles ==
Until its disbandment in December 2011, 817 was active as a helicopter squadron equipped with Westland Sea King Mk 50 helicopters. 817 Squadron was a land based squadron operating the Sea King helicopter in Fleet Utility Support roles, including Search and Rescue, Surveillance, and Air and ground crew training. 817 Squadron also had responsibility for maintaining and operating aircraft on the Kanimbla-class landing platform amphibious ships, along with HMAS Tobruk and HMAS Success. The Squadron was based at HMAS Albatross (NAS Nowra).

== History ==
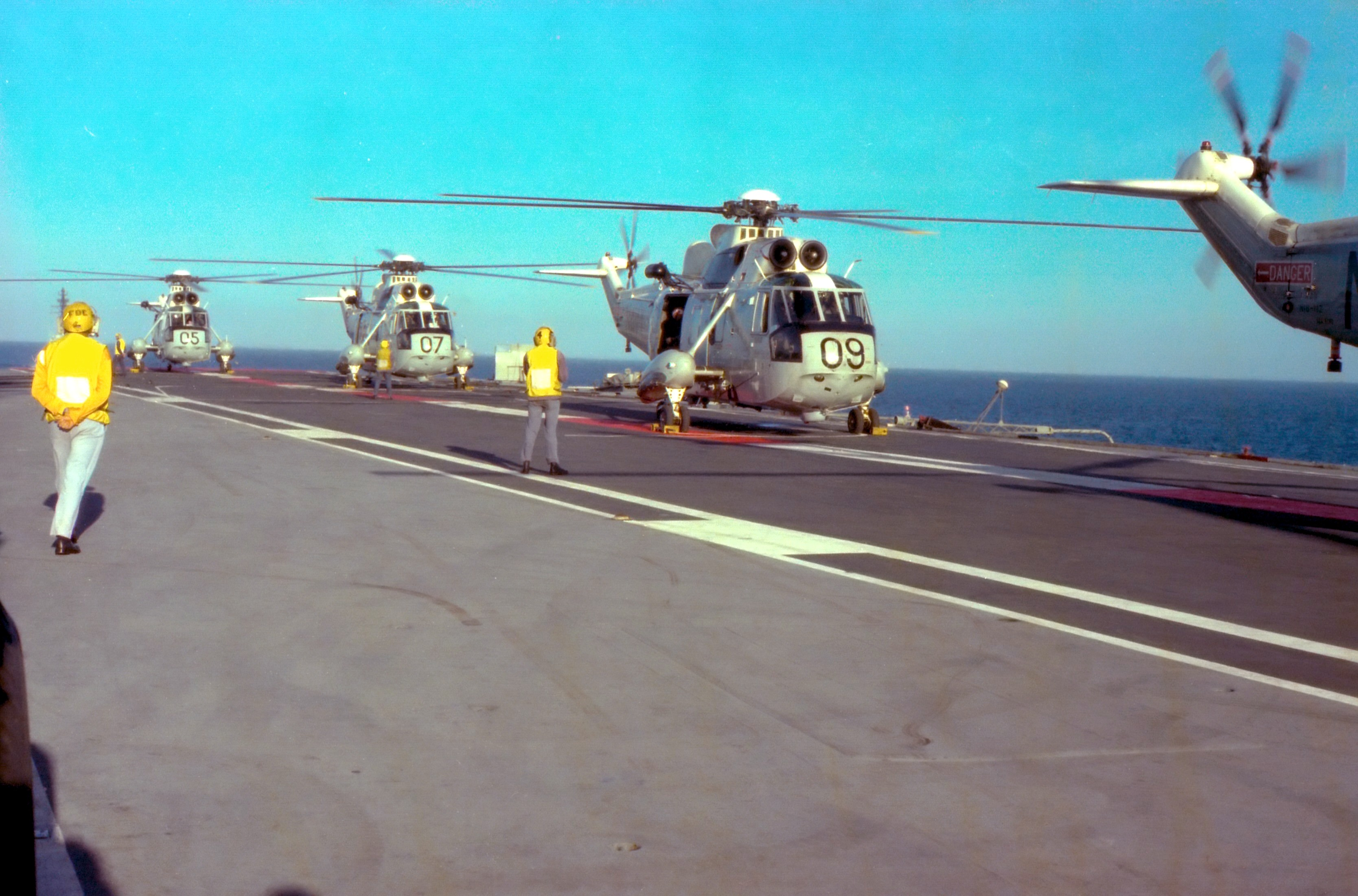
817 Squadron Sea Kings on board HMAS Melbourne in 1980

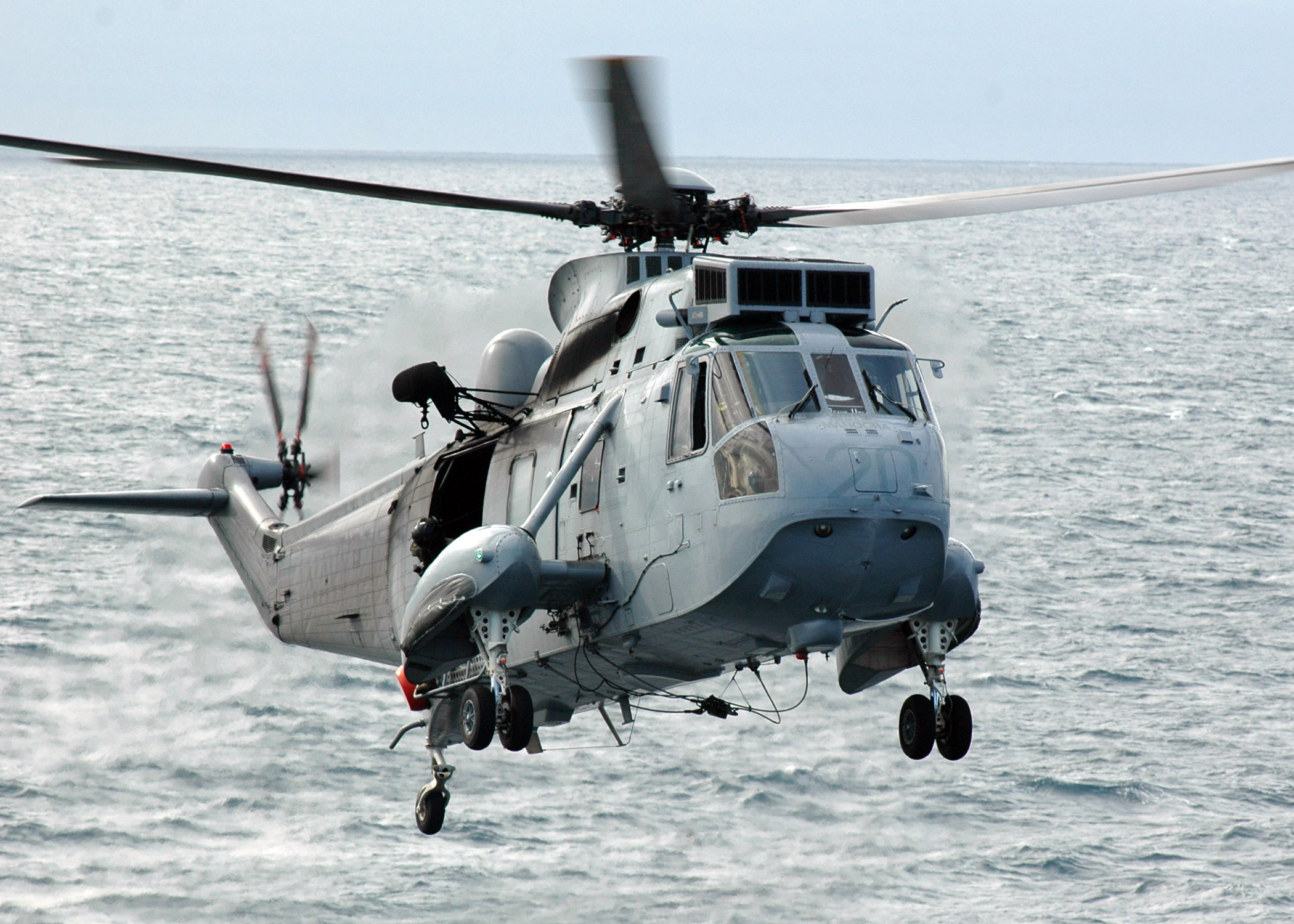
An 817 Squadron Sea King during an exercise in 2007

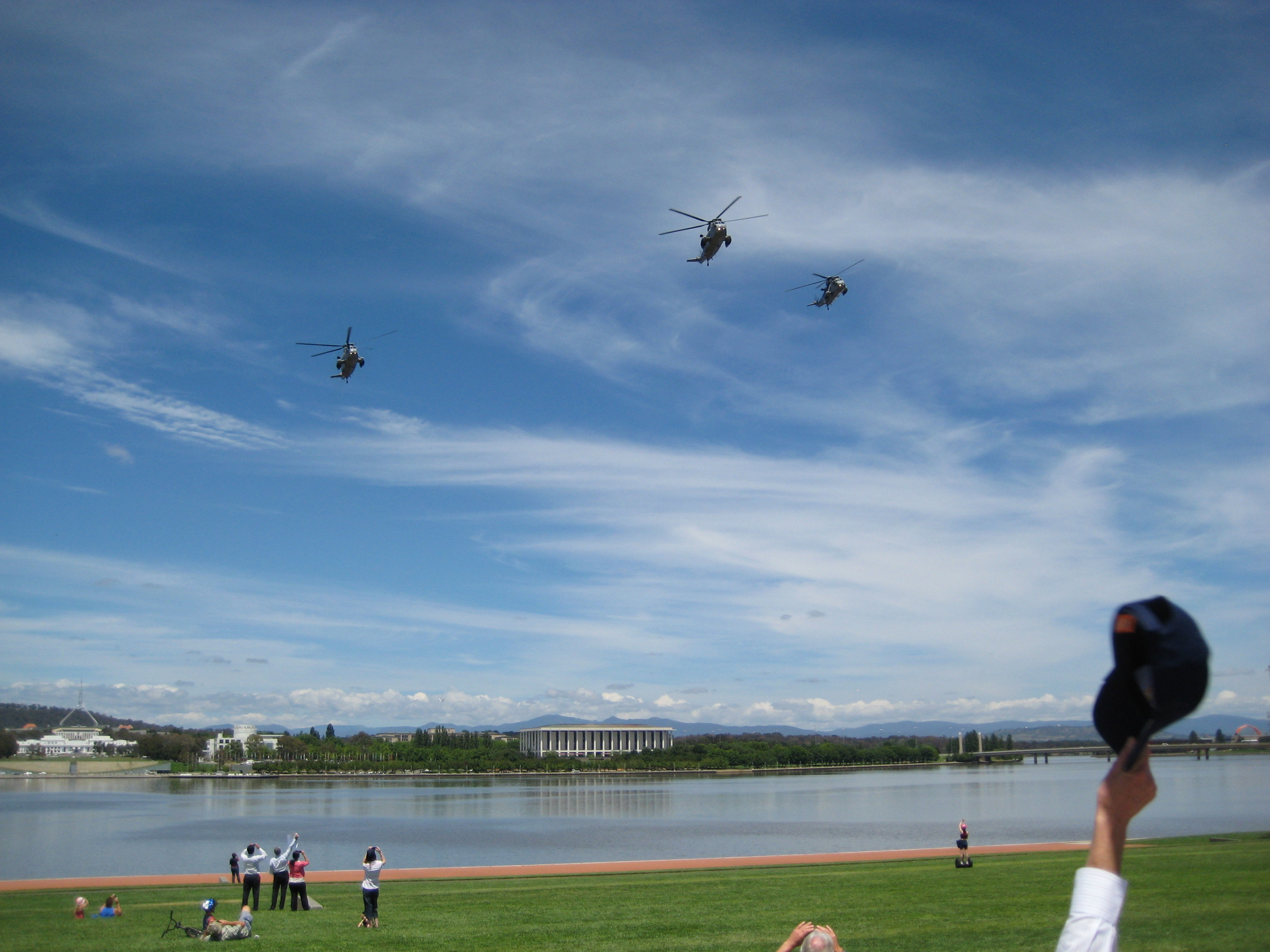
Shark 07, 21 and 22 Sea Kings on their final mission, 15 December 2011. Turning over Lake Burley Griffin, Canberra, Australian Capital Territory to track along Anzac Parade and over the Australian War Memorial before returning to Nowra for decommissioning.

817 Squadron was first formed as a Royal Navy Fleet Air Arm squadron in 1941, operating Fairey Albacore aircraft in the ASW role in Icelandic and Mediterranean waters. The Squadron reformed in 1943 with Fairey Barracuda aircraft and carried out operations in Sumatra and the Nicobar area before disbanding in 1945.

On 25 April 1950, 817 Squadron was re-formed as a Royal Australian Navy FAA squadron operating Fairey Firefly AS6 aircraft. The Squadron embarked on HMAS Sydney and served with distinction during the Korean War, operating the Fairey Firefly Mk5. In October 1953 the squadron embarked on HMAS Vengeance. The Squadron disbanded and reformed with Fairey Gannets in 1955, operating from HMAS Melbourne and conducting Fleet ASW support and training until 1958.

817 Squadron reformed in 1963 to conduct ASW, Fleet Utility support and training, equipped with Westland Wessex HAS.31A helicopters. These were updated to Wessex HAS.31Bs in 1968, and the Squadron was re-equipped with Westland Sea King MK50 helicopters in 1976. 817 Squadron operated from HMAS Melbourne, until the aircraft carrier decommissioned in 1982 without replacement.

Recent operational deployments have included UN operations in Somalia in 1993, peace keeping operations in Bougainville during 1994 (where one aircraft was hit by ground fire) and Operation Stabilise in East Timor during 1999 and 2000. 817 Squadron has also provided operational air support to the 2000 Sydney Olympic Games and support to the people of the Solomon Islands during 2000 and 2001 in Operation Trek, after the civil insurgence. The squadron was also called upon in 2003 to provide further air support in the Solomon Islands as part of Operation Anode.

817 Squadron has been heavily committed to the fight against terrorism with continuing deployments to the Persian Gulf aboard HMAS Kanimbla and HMAS Manoora. These deployments have formed an integral part of the Australian contingent of the International Coalition Against Terrorism (ICAT). During late 2001 and 2002, 817 Squadron aircraft deployed to the Persian Gulf as part of Operation Slipper to enforce UN sanctions against Iraq, and again in 2003 as part of Operation Falconer with the invasion and subsequent occupation of Iraq. The Squadron also has maintained one aircraft and crew at Christmas Island for various periods to provide a surveillance capability in defence of Australia's northern borders.

Most recently, 817 Squadron has provided aircraft for Operation Sumatra Assist and Operation Sumatra Assist II, which were Australia's contribution to the humanitarian effort in Indonesia as a result of the 2004 Indian Ocean tsunami and the subsequent 2005 Nias–Simeulue earthquake. During the latter operation, one of the two Seakings (Shark 02) embarked on HMAS Kanimbla, crashed on the Island of Nias with the loss of nine personnel. The accident occurred as a result of a series of maintenance errors, specifically the incorrect re-fitting of a nut and split pin during maintenance performed on the aircraft some two months before the crash. Deficiencies in maintenance practices, training, support and logistics operations within the Navy were also identified as contributing factors. Following the accident, several major changes were made to maintenance and safety management practices at 817 Squadron.

817 Squadron was decommissioned on 16 December 2011.

== Battle honours ==
The following battle honours have been awarded to 817 Squadron

- Norway 1942
- North Africa 1942
- Biscay 1942
- Sicily 1943
- Korea 1951–2
- Somalia 1993
- Iraq 2003

== Aircraft ==
=== RN Service ===
- Fairey Albacore (Torpedo Bomber)
- Fairey Barracuda (Torpedo / Dive Bomber)

=== Previous RAN Service ===
- Fairey Firefly AS6
- Fairey Firefly Mk5
- Fairey Gannet
- Westland Wessex HAS.31A
- Westland Wessex HAS.31B
- Westland Sea King Mk 50
