= Kanimbla-class landing platform amphibious =

1970 class of amphibious warfare vessels

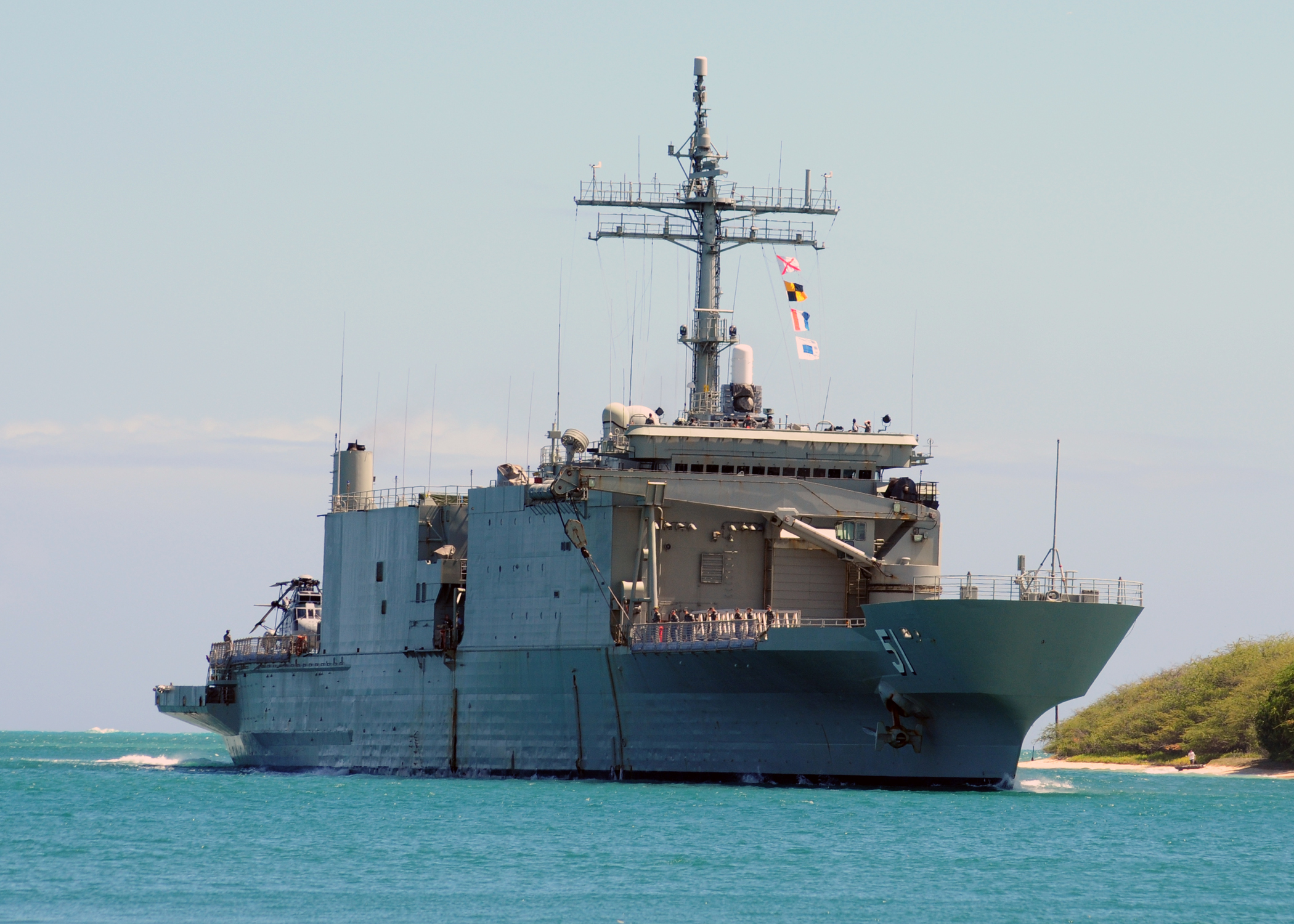
- HMAS Kanimbla entering Pearl Harbor during RIMPAC 2010

Class overview
- Name: Kanimbla class
- Builders: National Steel and Shipbuilding Company (original builders); Forgacs Dockyard (conversion)
- Operators: Royal Australian Navy
- Succeeded by: Canberra-class landing helicopter dock
- Built: 1971 (for US Navy)
- In service: 1999–2010
- In commission: 1994–2011
- Completed: 2
- Retired: 2

General characteristics
- Class & type: Modified Newport-class tank landing ship
- Displacement: 8,534 tons
- Length: 159.2 m (522 ft)
- Beam: 21.2 m (70 ft)
- Draught: 5.3 m (17 ft)
- Propulsion: 6 × ALCO V16 diesel engines, 2,750 hp (2,051 kW) each driving two shafts (3 engines per shaft)
- Speed: 22 knots (41 km/h; 25 mph)
- Range: 14,000 nautical miles (26,000 km; 16,000 mi) at 14 knots (26 km/h; 16 mph)
- Boats & landing craft carried: 2 x LCM8 landing craft
- Capacity: 450 embarked forces, 955 m^{2} (10,280 sq ft) of usable tank deck and cargo space
- Complement: 23 naval officers, 2 army officers, 197 sailors, 18 soldiers
- Armament: 1 × 20 mm Phalanx Mk 15 close–in weapon system, 6 × 12.7 mm Machine guns
- Aircraft carried: 4 x Blackhawk or 3 x Sea King
- Aviation facilities: 3 helicopter landing spots (2 aft, 1 forward); Hangar for 4 helicopters; Capable of landing and launching Chinook helicopters

The Kanimbla class was a class of amphibious transport ships (designated Landing Platform Amphibious) operated by the Royal Australian Navy (RAN). Two ships (originally built as Newport-class tank landing ships for the United States Navy) were purchased by Australia in 1994 and modified. Problems during the handover process and the need to repair previously unidentified defects meant the ships did not enter operational service until the end of the decade.

Since then, the two ships have been deployed to the Solomon Islands in 2000–01, Vanuatu in 2001, and participated in the Afghanistan and Iraq wars, the Australian response to the 2004 Indian Ocean tsunami, the Australian deployment to East Timor following the 2006 political crisis, and Operation Quickstep off Fiji.

After a large number of defects were found in both ships during late 2010, the vessels were docked. It was decided that Manoora was beyond economic repair, and she was decommissioned in May 2011. Kanimbla was to be repaired and returned to service, but the estimated cost and time to do this, plus the successful acquisition of the British landing ship dock RFA Largs Bay as an interim capability replacement, prompted the government to decommission Kanimbla in November 2011. Both ships were sold in 2013 and broken up for scrap.

== Acquisition ==
In the early 1990s, the RAN initiated a procurement project to replace HMAS Jervis Bay with a dedicated training and helicopter support ship. Meeting the vague specifications of the project required a purpose-built vessel at an approximate cost of A$500 million. The high cost of the project led to its cancellation by the Minister for Defence in 1993, with the instructions to find a cheaper alternative. At around the same time, the United States Navy (USN) began plans to decommission fifteen of their twenty Newport-class tank landing ships, offering them for purchase by various countries.

In 1994, the RAN elected to purchase two Newport-class ships, with Saginaw and Fairfax County selected and procured for the combined price of A$61 million (US$40 million), with the intention of converting each into a combined pocket helicopter carrier and amphibious warfare transport. Saginaw was to decommission in the US and be immediately recommissioned into the RAN as HMAS Kanimbla, and be sailed to Australia by a RAN crew, while Fairfax County was to travel to Australia with a USN crew before decommissioning and recommissioning as HMAS Manoora. Prior to Saginaw's decommissioning, a RAN crew was sent to Norfolk, Virginia for training aboard the vessel.

Saginaw was decommissioned on 28 June 1994, but instead of being immediately recommissioned as HMAS Kanimbla, it was announced at the decommissioning ceremony that the United States Congress had decided not to release the ships into foreign service. This last-minute move was part of a sale blockage for the fifteen surplus Newports to nine nations, and was caused by the United States Senate Committee on Armed Services in an attempt to pressure US President Bill Clinton on the perceived running-down of the USN's amphibious warfare capability, as well as the concerns of one Senator over human rights in Morocco (one of the other nations slated to acquire a ship). The sale to Australia was not approved until the start of August and Saginaw commissioned as HMAS Kanimbla on 29 August 1994.

== Conversion and capabilities ==
After transferring into the RAN and arriving in Australia, Kanimbla and Manoora spent two years docked at Fleet Base East before they were moved to Forgacs Dockyard at Newcastle, New South Wales in June 1996, where they underwent conversion from tank landing ships to amphibious warfare transports. The conversion required the main features of the Newport class, the bow doors, derrick, and tank ramp, to be removed. A hangar for three Sea King or four Blackhawk helicopters was added, while the aft helicopter deck was reinforced. Chinook helicopters were able to land and take off from the aft deck, but could not be carried for prolonged periods. The deck forward of the superstructure was converted to carry two LCM-8 landing craft, which were launched and recovered by a single 70-ton crane. When the LCM-8s were not aboard, the area functioned as a third helicopter landing spot. Accommodation was provided for up to 450 soldiers, while improved medical facilities and an upgraded galley were also installed. Each ship had 955 square metres (10,280 sq ft) of deck space for vehicles and cargo.

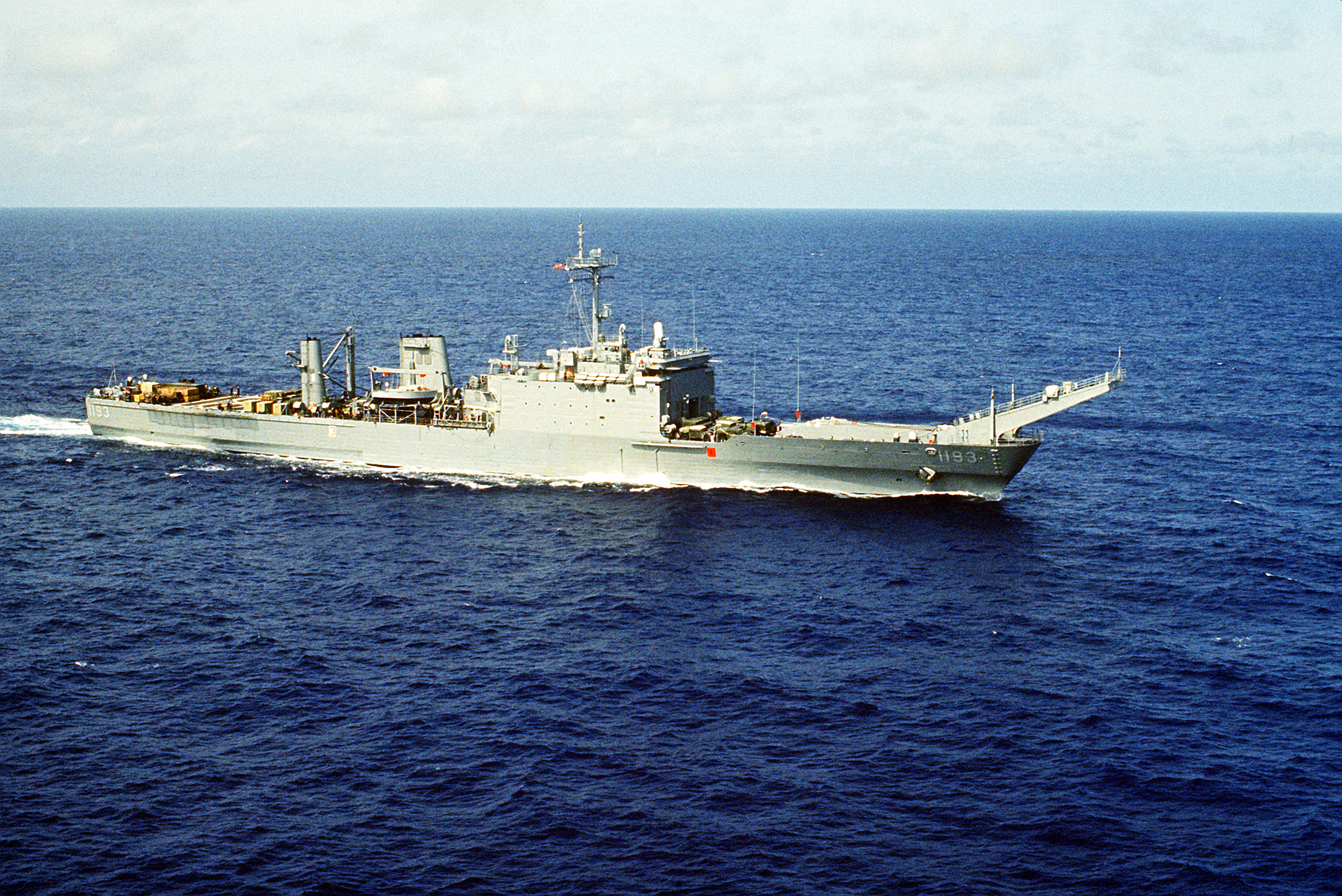
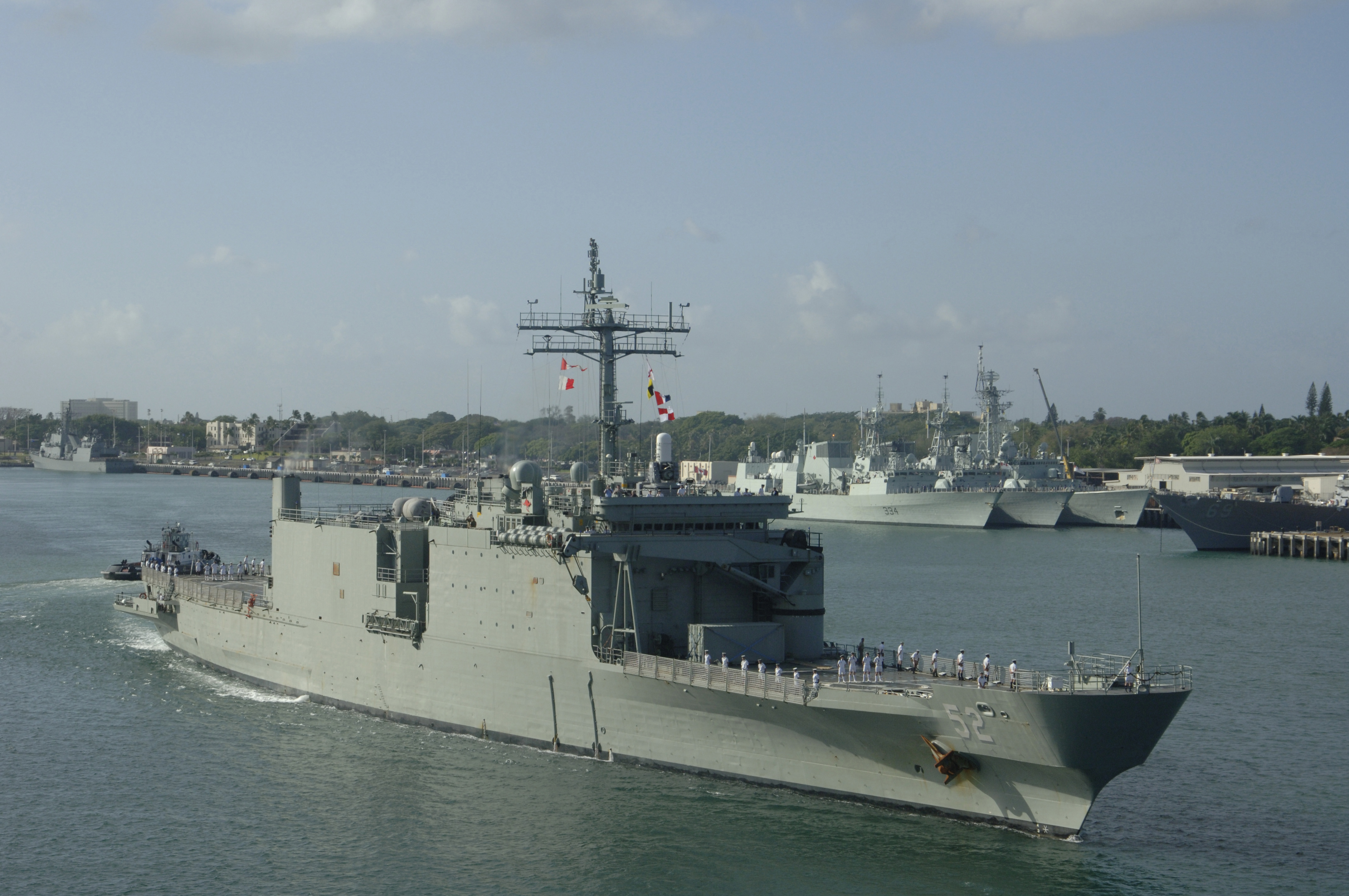
Starboard bow views of Manoora, in both her pre-conversion (left, as Fairfax County in 1993) and post-conversion (right, 2006) configurations.

Following the conversions, the ships had a displacement of 8,534 tons, a length of 159.2 metres (522 ft), a beam of 21.2 metres (70 ft), and a draught of 5.3 metres (17 ft). Propulsion was provided by ALCO V16 diesel engines creating 2,750 horsepower (2,050 kW) each, with each of the two propeller shafts connected to three engines. Maximum speed was 22 knots (41 km/h; 25 mph), and each ship had a range of 14,000 nautical miles (26,000 km; 16,000 mi) at 14 knots (26 km/h; 16 mph). Shipboard weapons consisted of a 20 mm Phalanx Mk 15 close–in weapon system, supplemented by six 12.7 mm machine guns. Each ship's company consisted of 23 officers and 197 sailors, plus a permanently embarked army detachment of 2 officers and 18 soldiers.

The refit was planned to last from 1995 to 1996, with Manoora upgraded first. However, extensive corrosion was discovered in both ships. The refit cost for the two ships increased to A$400 million, with half of the funding taken from repair and refit allocations for other ships. The two ships did not enter service until the end of the decade.

== Operational history ==
The two ships were based at Fleet Base East. The Kanimblas operated primarily in South East Asian regions, and were usually the first asset deployed by the Australian government during regional emergencies. Both ships deployed to the Solomon Islands in 2000–01 in support of operations there, while Kanimbla took part in disaster relief operations in Vanuatu in 2001. They have since participated in the Afghanistan and Iraq wars, the Australian response to the 2004 Indian Ocean tsunami, and the Australian deployment to East Timor following the 2006 political crisis, among other deployments. Two helicopters have crashed while operating from Kanimbla; a Sea King which crashed off the island of Nias in Indonesia on 2 April 2005 killing nine personnel, and an S-70A Blackhawk helicopter which crashed in international waters off Fiji on 29 November 2006 during Operation Quickstep, killing the pilot and a trooper from the Special Air Service Regiment.

In late September 2010, both ships were brought to Fleet Base East for an 'operational pause' after several problems were identified with the ships. These included large quantities of corrosion, faults with the deck crane and alarm system, the need to overhaul propulsion machinery, power generators, and air conditioning, and an outdated communication suite. The problems have been attributed to the ship's high operational tempo, delays in maintenance, and the age of the ships. On 1 November it was reported that the two vessels might never put to sea again due to their poor condition, but a Navy spokesman was quoted the next day as saying that they would both be repaired by early 2011.

On 1 February 2011 the Minister for Defence announced that repairing Manoora would not be cost effective given that the ship was scheduled to retired at the end of 2012 and that she would instead be decommissioned. Manoora was decommissioned at Fleet Base East on 27 May 2011. At the time of the February 2010 announcement, the intention was to repair Kanimbla return her to active service by mid-2012, and let her continue operating until her original 2014 decommissioning date. However, the predicted time frame and cost of the repairs (18 months and over $35 million), and the successful acquisition of the British landing ship dock RFA Largs Bay (which entered RAN service at the end of 2011 as HMAS Choules) prompted the Australian government to announce plans on 18 August 2011 to decommission Kanimbla at earliest opportunity. Kanimbla was decommissioned on 25 November 2011.

== Replacement and fate ==
In 2008, the intention was to retire the two ships in the mid-2010s: one would be replaced by one of the Canberra-class landing helicopter dock ships by 2015, the other by a strategic sealift ship sometime between 2016 and 2018. The early decommissioning of the two vessels in 2011 diminished the RAN's amphibious and transport capability, with Choules and the support vessel ADV Ocean Shield purchased to cover the gap until the Canberras enter service.

In June 2012, the federal government offered Kanimbla and Manoora to the Queensland state government for scuttling as dive wrecks off the Queensland coast. However, the government chose not to go ahead with this, as it would cost $4 million each to prepare them for scuttling, and could provoke similar reactions to the contested sinking of the frigate HMAS Adelaide. Instead, it was announced in January 2013 that the two ships would be broken up, with an estimated scrap metal value of $2.5 million each. Because the two vessels were originally owned by the United States of America and were sold to Australia, their disposal had to receive US government approval and comply with International Traffic in Arms Regulations. Tendering for the disposal of the vessels began in June 2012, with the contract awarded to Southern Recycling LLC on 20 May 2013. The two vessels were towed in tandem to Gulfport, Mississippi, arriving on 3 October. The ships were then towed to Southern Recycling's facilities in New Orleans for scrapping.

== Ships ==
| Name | Pennant Number | Builder | Laid down | Launched | Commissioned (into RAN) | Decommissioned | Fate |
|---|---|---|---|---|---|---|---|
| Kanimbla (ex-Saginaw) | L51 | National Steel and Shipbuilding Company, San Diego | 24 May 1969 | 7 February 1970 | 29 August 1994 | 25 November 2011 | Broken up at New Orleans |
| Manoora (ex-Fairfax County) | L52 | National Steel and Shipbuilding Company, San Diego | 28 March 1970 | 19 December 1970 | 25 November 1994 | 7 May 2011 | Broken up at New Orleans |
