= Manoora =

Manoora may refer to:

- Manoora, South Australia, a town in the Mid North region of South Australia
- Manoora, Queensland, a suburb of Cairns
- HMAS Manoora, either of two former ships of the Royal Australian Navy:
  - HMAS Manoora (F48), a passenger liner requisitioned by the RAN in 1939 for use as an armed merchant cruiser and later a landing ship, and returned to her owners in 1949
  - HMAS Manoora (L 52), an amphibious transport ship acquired from the United States in 1994 and decommissioned in 2011
