= Kanimbla =

Kanimbla may refer to:

- HMAS Kanimbla, several ships of Royal Australian Navy
- Kanimbla a Sydney K-class ferry
- Kanimbla-class landing platform amphibious
- Kanimbla, Queensland, a suburb of the city of Cairns in Australia
- Kanimbla Valley, a valley in New South Wales, see list of valleys of Australia
