= HMAS Kanimbla (L 51) =

Amphibious Ship operated by the Australian Navy

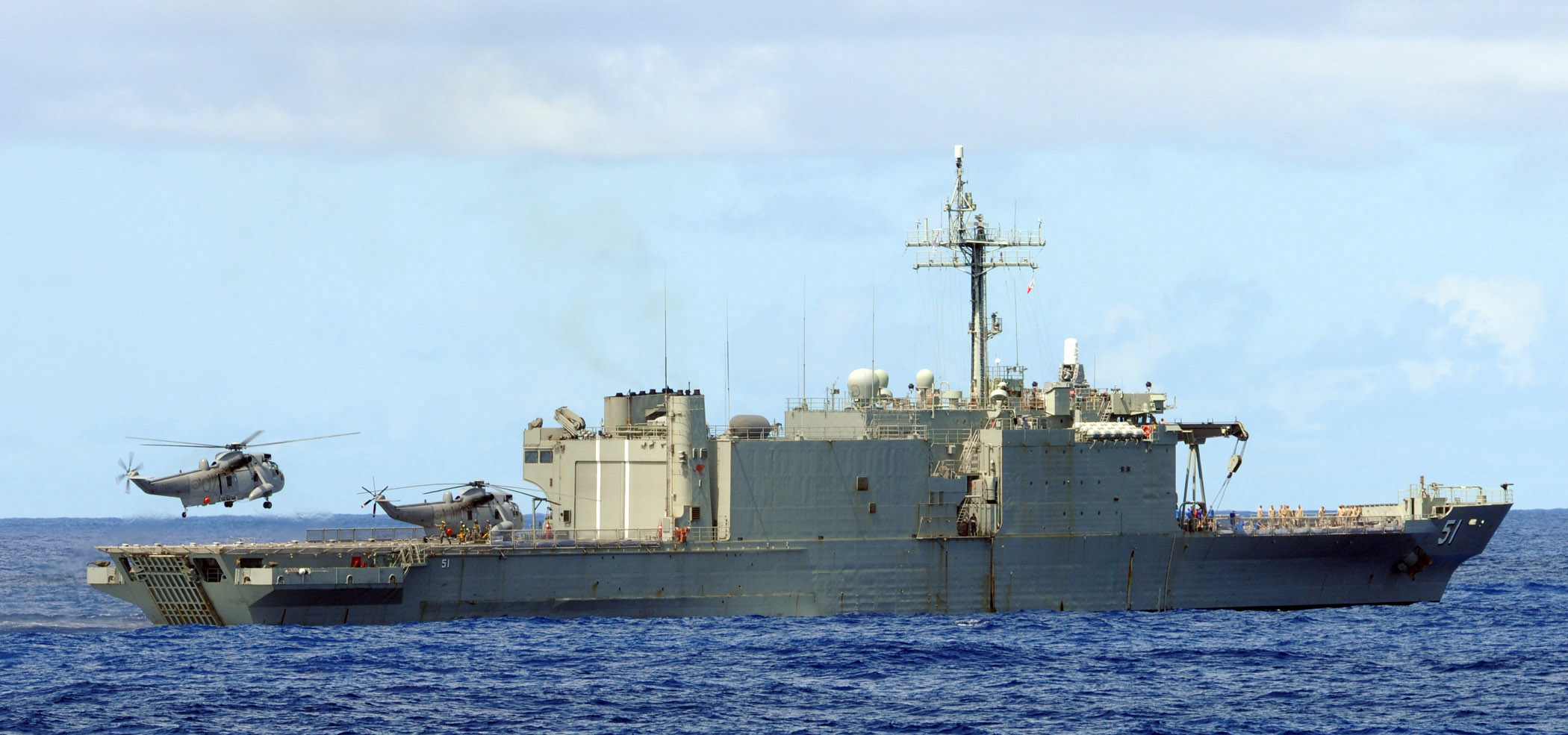
- HMAS Kanimbla in 2010

History

United States
- Name: Saginaw
- Namesake: City of Saginaw, Michigan
- Builder: National Steel & Shipbuilding Company
- Laid down: 24 May 1969
- Launched: 7 February 1970
- Sponsored by: Wife of R. James Harvey
- Commissioned: 23 January 1971
- Decommissioned: 28 June 1994
- Home port: Little Creek, Virginia
- Identification: LST-1188
- Fate: Transferred to the Royal Australian Navy in 1994

Australia
- Name: Kanimbla
- Namesake: Kanimbla Valley
- Commissioned: 29 August 1994
- Decommissioned: 25 November 2011
- Home port: Fleet Base East
- Identification: L 51
- Motto: "Cry Havoc"
- Honours and awards: Battle honours: Persian Gulf 2001–03; Iraq 2003; plus five inherited honours; Awards: Meritorious Unit Citation
- Fate: Sold for scrap, 20 May 2013
- Badge: Ship's badge

General characteristics as Kanimbla
- Class & type: Kanimbla-class landing platform amphibious
- Displacement: 8,534 tons
- Length: 159.2 m (522 ft 4 in)
- Beam: 21.2 m (69 ft 7 in)
- Draught: 5.3 m (17 ft 5 in)
- Propulsion: 6 × ALCO V16 diesel engines, 2,050 kW (2,750 hp) each driving two shafts (3 engines per shaft)
- Speed: 22 knots (41 km/h; 25 mph)
- Range: 14,000 nmi (26,000 km; 16,000 mi) at 14 knots (26 km/h; 16 mph)
- Boats & landing craft carried: 2 × LCM8 landing craft
- Capacity: 400 embarked forces, 955 m^{2} (10,280 sq ft) of usable tank deck space
- Complement: 23 naval officers, 2 army officers, 197 sailors, 18 soldiers
- Armament: 1 × 20 mm (0.8 in) Phalanx Mk 15 close–in weapon system; 6 × 12.7 mm (0.5 in) machine guns
- Aircraft carried: 4 × Blackhawk or 3 × Sea King
- Aviation facilities: Hangar for 4 helicopters, 3 landing spots

HMAS Kanimbla (L 51) was a Kanimbla-class landing platform amphibious ship operated by the Royal Australian Navy (RAN). Originally built for the United States Navy (USN) as the Newport-class tank landing ship USS Saginaw (LST-1188), the ship was decommissioned in 1994 and sold to the RAN.

After entering service with the RAN in 1999, Kanimbla participated in numerous worldwide deployments, including the 2003 invasion of Iraq, the response to the 2004 Indian Ocean earthquake and tsunami, and in response to the 2006 Fijian coup d'état. During the ship's career, two helicopters were lost in crashes. After a fire broke out aboard Kanimbla in late 2010, she and sister ship Manoora were removed from active service because of extensive problems found aboard both ships. The intention was to repair Kanimbla and return her to service by 2012, but this was deemed uneconomical. The ship was decommissioned in 2011, and sold for breaking in 2013.

== Design and construction ==
The ship was laid down by National Steel & Shipbuilding Company at San Diego, California for the USN on 24 May 1969 as Newport-class tank landing ship USS Saginaw. She was launched on 7 February 1970, sponsored by the wife of R. James Harvey, a Congressman and former mayor of Saginaw, Michigan, and commissioned into the United States Navy on 23 January 1971. She was named after the city of Saginaw, Michigan.

== Transfer and conversion ==
In the early 1990s, the RAN initiated a procurement project to replace HMAS Jervis Bay with a dedicated training and helicopter support ship. Meeting the vague specifications of the project required a purpose-built vessel at an approximate cost of A$500 million. The high cost of the project led to its cancellation by the Minister for Defence in 1993, with the instructions to find a cheaper alternative.

In 1994, the RAN was able to acquire the surplus Saginaw and her sister ship Fairfax County for the combined price of A$61 million (US$40 million). Saginaw was to be renamed Kanimbla. Prior to Saginaw's decommissioning and transfer, a RAN crew was sent to Norfolk, Virginia, for several weeks training aboard the vessel, as they were to sail her to Australia after she was commissioned into the RAN. Saginaw was decommissioned on 28 June 1994, but instead of being immediately recommissioned as HMAS Kanimbla, it was announced at the decommissioning ceremony that the United States Congress had decided not to release the ships into foreign service. The last-minute move was part of a sale blockage for fifteen surplus Newports to nine nations, and was caused by the United States Senate Committee on Armed Services in an attempt to pressure US President Bill Clinton on the perceived running-down of the USN's amphibious warfare capability, as well as the concerns of one Senator over human rights in Morocco (one of the other nations slated to acquire a Newport-class ship). The sale was not approved until the start of August, with the ship commissioned into the RAN on 29 August 1994.

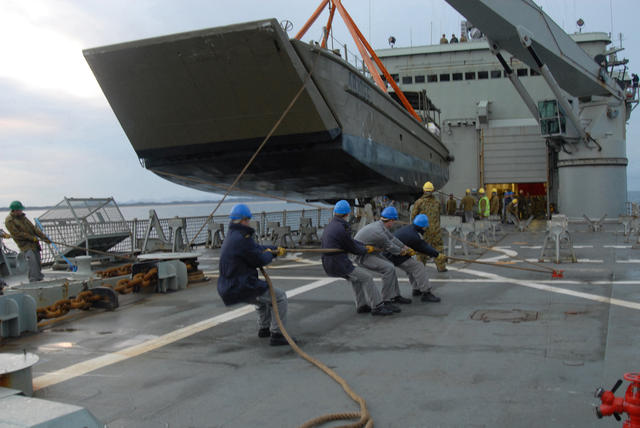
Kanimbla with a LCM-8

Kanimbla sailed to Australia in October, after training and maintenance checks were completed. Kanimbla and Manoora were docked at Forgacs Shipyard, Newcastle where they underwent conversion from tank landing ships to amphibious warfare transports. The conversion required the bow ramp to be removed and the bow doors welded shut. A hangar for three Sea King or four Blackhawk helicopters was added, while the aft helicopter deck was reinforced. Chinook helicopters are able to land and take off from the aft deck, but cannot be carried long-term. The deck forward of the superstructure was converted to carry two LCM-8 landing craft, which are launched and recovered by a single 70 ton crane. When the LCM-8s are deployed, the area functions as a third helicopter landing spot. Accommodation was provided for up to 450 soldiers, while improved medical facilities and an upgraded galley were also installed.

The refit was planned to last from 1995 to 1996, but did not conclude until late 1999, after extensive corrosion was discovered in both ships. The now controversial refit cost for the two ships increased A$400 million, with half of the funding taken from repair and refit allocations for other ships. During Kanimbla's conversion, a small fire started aboard, when a cigarette butt was dropped on piping insulation. The fire, which occurred on 8 February 1999, was extinguished quickly, and only caused superficial damage.

== RAN operational history ==
=== 1995–2003 ===
During 1995, personnel from Kanimbla participated in celebrations for the 50th anniversaries of Victory in Europe Day and Victory in the Pacific Day. In April 1999, personnel from Kanimbla, Manoora, and Sydney bases assisted the New South Wales Department of Agriculture in containing an outbreak of Newcastle disease in Mangrove Mountain poultry farms.

Between April and June 2001, Kanimbla was sent to Vanuatu to provide disaster relief assistance following the eruption of the Lopevi volcano. After this, from 2 June to 8 August 2001, the ship was deployed to the Solomon Islands to support the International Peace Monitoring Team following the signing of the Townsville Peace Agreement. Following this, Kanimbla operated in support of the Peace Monitoring Group (PMG) in Bougainville. This was a short term assignment at the end of the Solomon Islands deployment to assist with backload of PMG equipment to Australia.

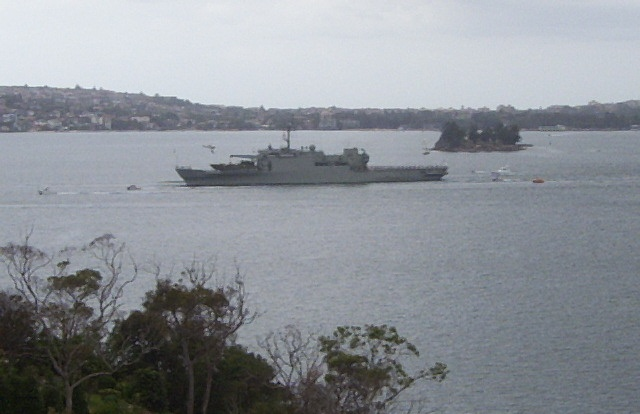
HMAS Kanimbla leaving Port Jackson for the Persian Gulf in 2003

On 2 December 2001, Kanmibla and the frigate Adelaide were deployed to the Persian Gulf as part of Operation Slipper, to enforce UN trade sanction against Iraq. This deployment concluded on 4 March 2002. The ship returned to the Gulf on 13 February 2003. During this deployment, which concluded on 14 June, she was involved in the 2003 invasion of Iraq, served as a command-and-control ship during operations in the northern waters of the Gulf, and helped deliver relief supplies to Baghdad. The ship received a Meritorious Unit Citation on 27 November 2003 for her service during this deployment.

=== 2004–2006 ===
On 30 December 2004, Kanimbla sailed as part of Operation Sumatra Assist, the Australian contribution to relief efforts following the 2004 Indian Ocean earthquake and tsunami. The ship's involvement ended on 26 March 2005, and she sailed to Singapore, but was redeployed three days later after a new earthquake off the Sumatran coast. On 2 April, a Sea King helicopter operating from Kanimbla crashed on the island of Nias, killing nine of the eleven personnel aboard; the single deadliest incident in the Australian Defence Force since 1996. Operations did not conclude until 13 April.

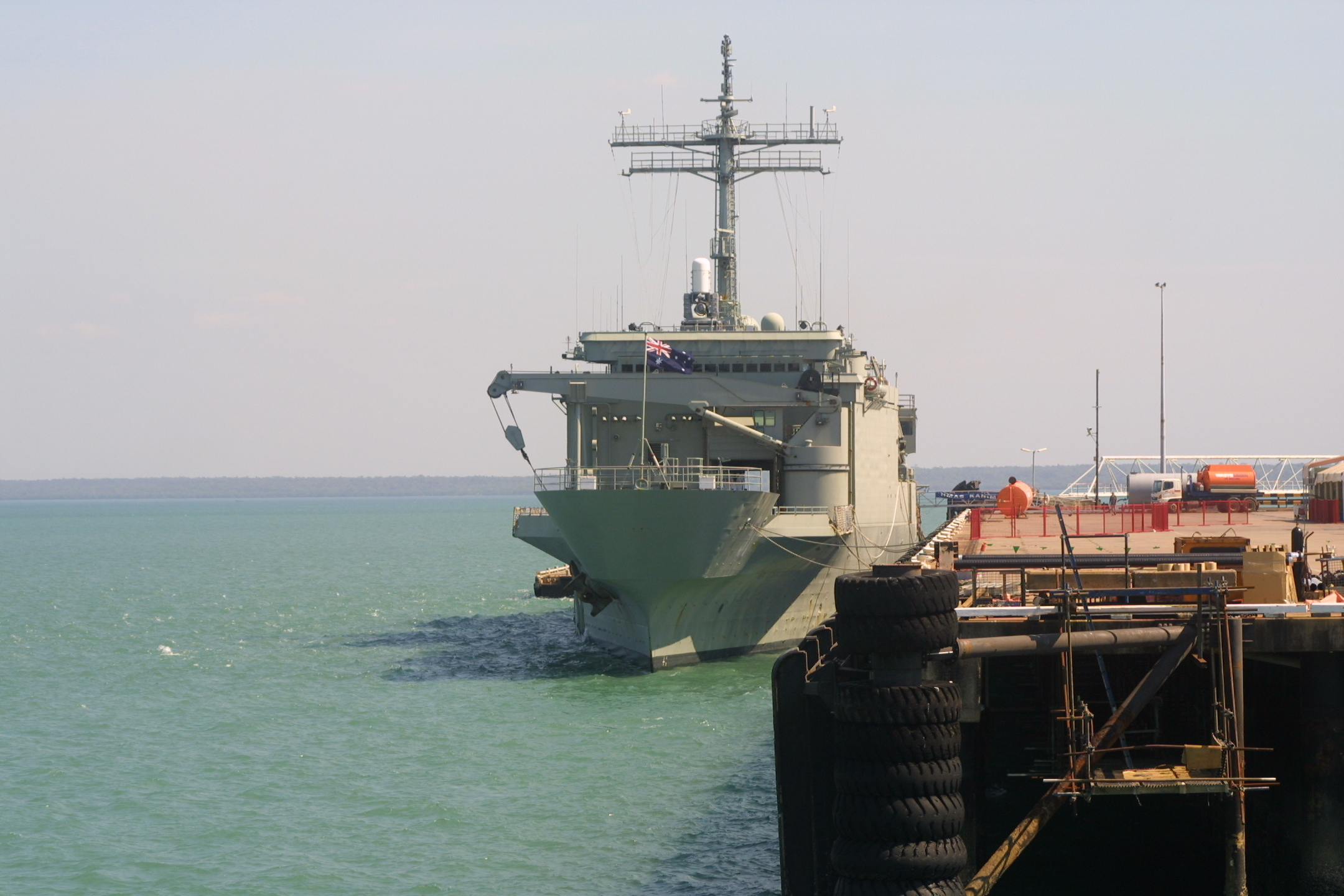
HMAS Kanimbla at Darwin in July 2006

In May 2006, Kanimbla was deployed to East Timor as part of Operation Astute, the Australian response to the 2006 East Timorese crisis. The ship remained in the area until late July. At the start of November 2006, Kanimbla, Newcastle, and Success sailed to Fiji as part of Operation Quickstep, the ADF response to threats of a coup d'état by Fijian military forces. The three vessels were to be used in the event of an evacuation of Australian citizens and nationals, but not as a military force. On 29 November 2006, an Australian Army S-70A Black Hawk helicopter operating from Kanimbla crashed and fell overboard while attempting to land on the aft helicopter deck. Of the ten Army personnel on board, seven were injured, one was killed, and the tenth was declared missing until his remains were found on 5 March 2007, trapped in the helicopter wreckage 3,000 metres (9,800 ft) below sea level.

=== 2007–2010 ===
In October 2007, Kanimbla visited New Zealand. The ship had been previously scheduled to visit New Zealand on two occasions in 2006, but was unable to on both occasions due to short-notice operational deployments.

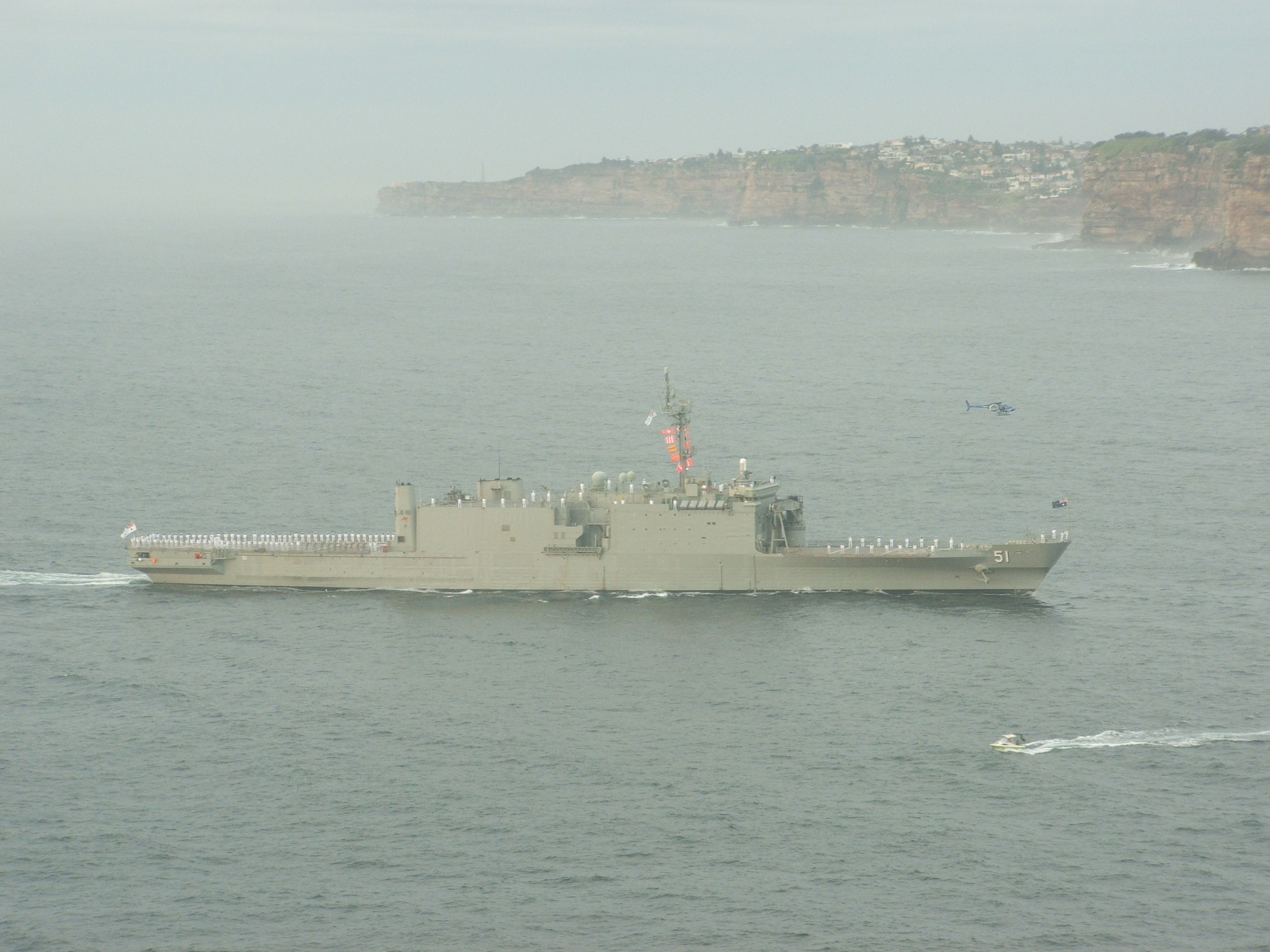
Kanimbla performing a ceremonial entry into Sydney Harbour. The ocean-side cliffs of South Head are in the background.

On the morning of 13 March 2009, Kanimbla was one of seventeen warships involved in a ceremonial fleet entry and fleet review in Sydney Harbour, the largest collection of RAN ships since the Australian Bicentenary in 1988. Kanimbla was one of the thirteen ships involved in the ceremonial entry through Sydney Heads, and anchored in the harbour for the review.

Following an overhaul of the RAN battle honour system completed in early 2010, Kanimbla was also granted the battle honours "Persian Gulf 2001–2003" and "Iraq 2003". During July and August 2010, Kanimbla was one of three RAN ships to participate in the RIMPAC 2010 multinational exercise.

== Decommissioning and fate ==
On 21 September 2010, Kanimbla was leaving Sydney Harbour when a fire broke out aboard and caused the ship to lose power briefly. During the incident the ship drifted dangerously close to the North Head. Shortly after this, Kanimbla and sister ship Manoora were brought to Fleet Base East for an 'operational pause' after several problems were identified with both ships. These included large quantities of ongoing corrosion and faults with the deck crane and alarm system, along with the need to overhaul the propulsion system, power generators, and air-conditioning, and upgrade the communication suite. The problems have been attributed to the ship's high operational tempo, delays in maintenance, and the age of the ships.

Manoora was marked for decommissioning in early 2011, but the intention at that time was to repair Kanimbla and return her to active service by mid-2012. However, the predicted timeframe and cost of the repairs (18 months and over $35 million), and the successful acquisition of the British landing ship dock RFA Largs Bay (which entered RAN service at the end of 2011 as HMAS Choules) prompted the Australian government to announce plans on 18 August 2011 to decommission Kanimbla. The decommissioning occurred on 25 November 2011. The ship's capability was initially replaced by Choules, until the Canberra-class amphibious warfare ships entered service.

In June 2012, the federal government offered Kanimbla and Manoora to the Queensland state government for scuttling as dive wrecks off the Queensland coast. However, the government chose not to go ahead with this, as it would cost $4 million each to prepare them for scuttling, and could provoke similar reactions to the contested sinking of the frigate HMAS Adelaide. Instead, Kanimbla was to be broken up, with an estimated scrap metal value of $2.5 million. Because the two vessels were originally owned by the United States and were sold to Australia, their disposal had to receive US government approval and comply with International Traffic in Arms Regulations. Tendering for the disposal of the vessels began in June 2012, with the contract awarded to Southern Recycling on 20 May 2013. The two vessels were returned to the United States, and broken up in New Orleans.
