= Operation Quickstep =

2006 Australian evacuation preparation operation near Fiji

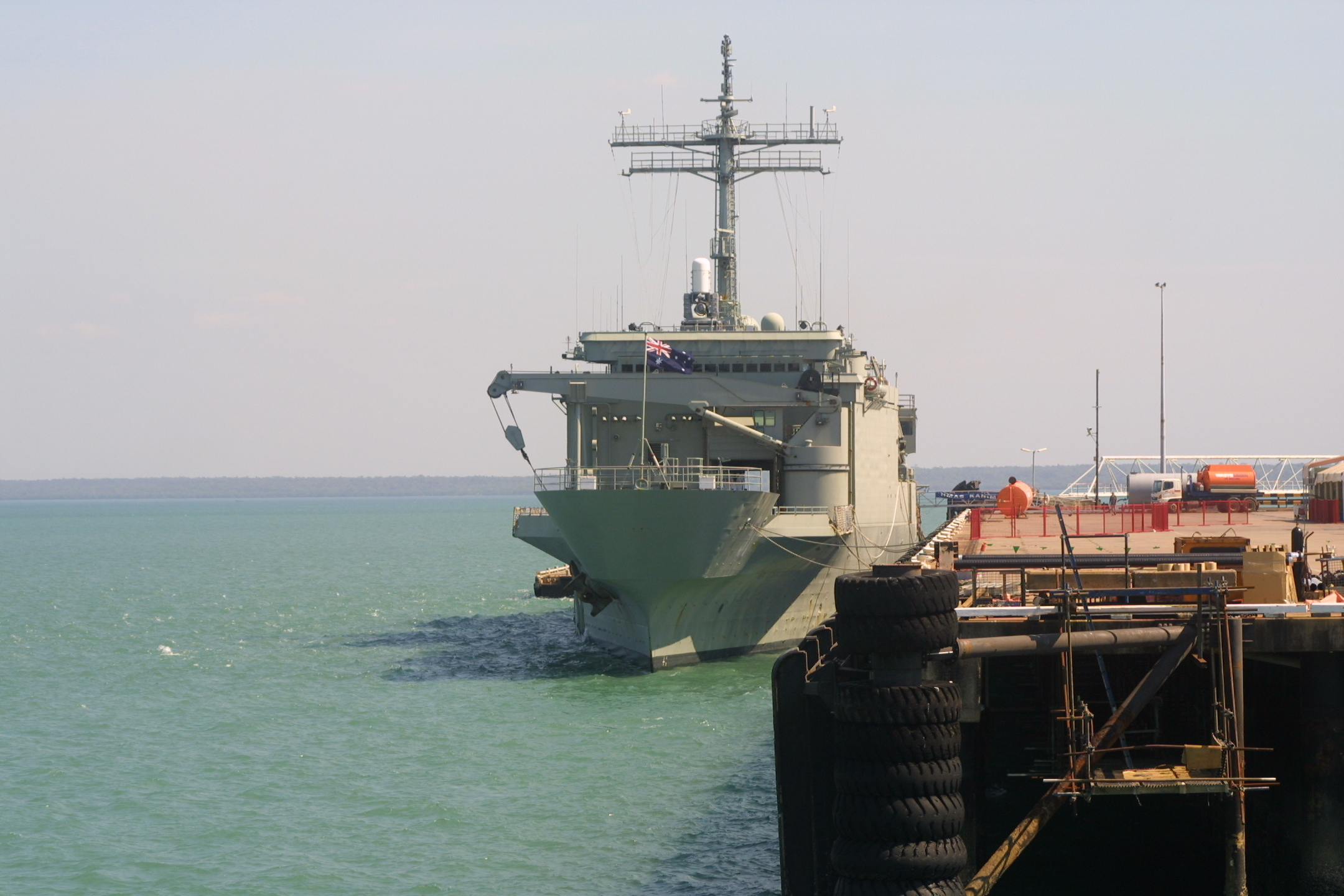
- HMAS Kanimbla in Darwin in July 2006
- Objective: Preparations for the evacuation of Australians from Fiji
- Date: 1 November – 17 December 2006
- Outcome: Evacuation was not required and the units involved returned to Australia on 17 December
- Casualties: 2 killed, 1 S-70 Blackhawk lost

Operation Quickstep was the deployment of military resources by the Australian Defence Force during the leadup to the 2006 Fijian coup d'état on 4–5 December 2006, during which the Fijian military took control of the Fijian government which, at the time, was led by Prime Minister Laisenia Qarase. The intention behind deploying the military resources was to provide a platform for the evacuation of Australian citizens and nationals in the event of a violent military takeover of the Pacific nation.

Three ships of the Royal Australian Navy were deployed to the South-west Pacific, taking up station in international waters near Fiji, while several military transport aircraft were kept on standby.

== Timeline ==
Following tensions in Fiji between the military and the government throughout 2005–2006, the Australian Government dispatched three naval vessels to international waters off Fiji, in preparation for a potential evacuation of Australians. HMAS Newcastle was the first ship to arrive on station, having departed Sydney on 1 November. HMAS Kanimbla departed two days later, after taking on additional equipment and personnel. HMAS Success joined the two ships later, arriving on or before 24 November.

On 29 November 2006, a S-70 Blackhawk operating from Kanimbla crashed while attempting to land on the ship's deck, falling overboard and sinking in 3,000 metres (9,800 ft) of water. Nine of the ten crewmembers were rescued, with one, the pilot Captain Mark Bingley, dying from injuries. The tenth crewmember, J. N. N. Porter, was lost and declared dead several days later. On 6 March 2007, the Minister for Defence, Brendan Nelson, announced that the Defence Maritime Services vessel MV Seahorse Standard had recovered Porter's body from a depth of approximately 2,900 metres (9,500 ft).

The predicted coup d'état was carried out with minimal violence and no bloodshed on 4–5 December 2006, with government officials placed under house arrest and Fiji's parliament dissolved.

The forces committed to the possible evacuation returned to Australia on 17 December. The feared violence had not occurred, and civilian flights to Fiji continued without disruption during the takeover. The need for a military-backed evacuation force was not evident at that point in time.

== Military units involved ==
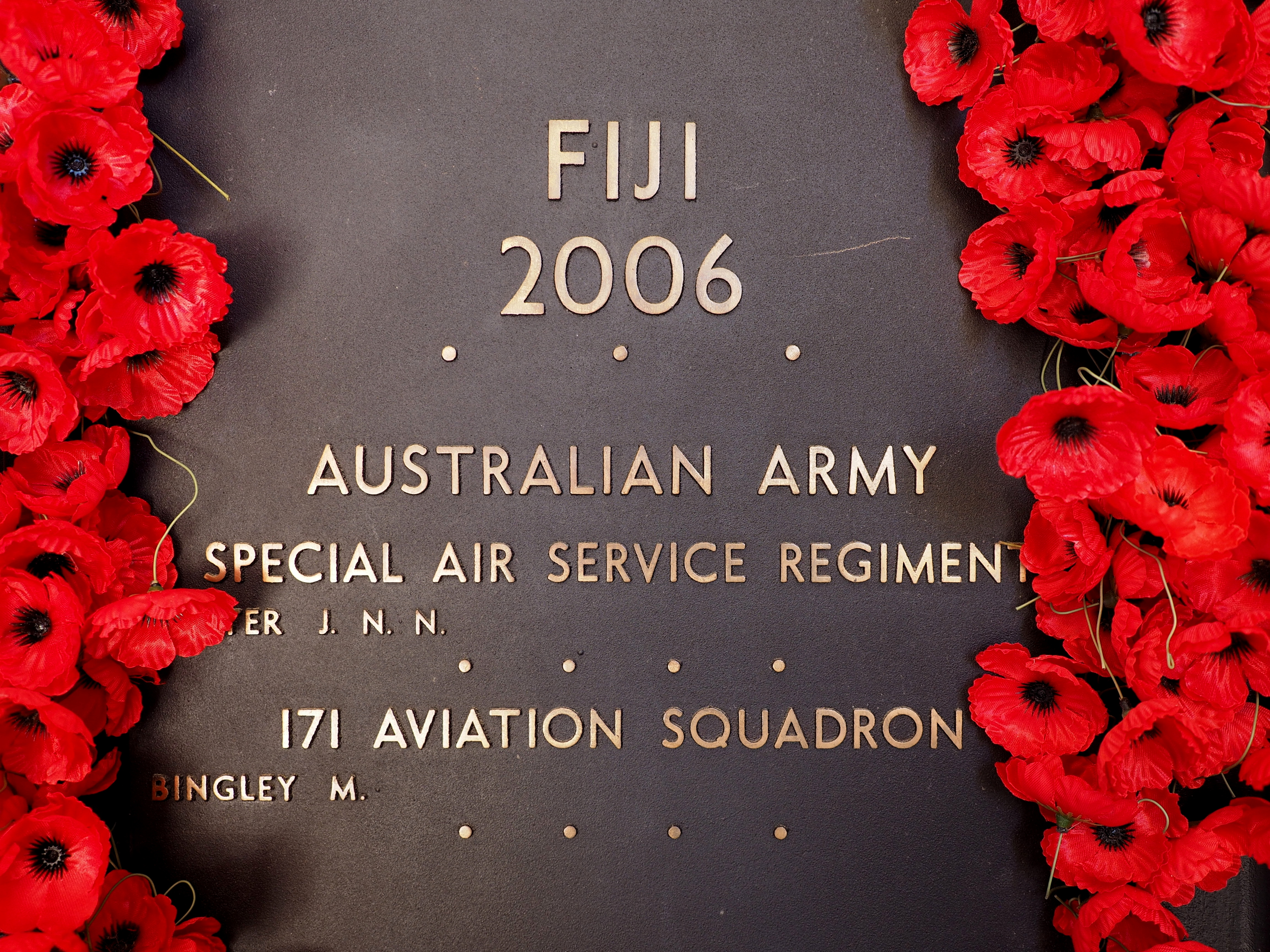
The section of the Roll of Honour at the Australian War Memorial commemorating the two Australian Army personnel killed during Operation Quickstep

Approximately 800 personnel were mobilised as part of the operation, primarily from the Royal Australian Navy, Australian Army and Royal Australian Air Force.

=== RAN ===
- HMAS Newcastle carrying:
  - A Seahawk Helicopter
- HMAS Kanimbla carrying:
  - A Commando Contingent
  - A Special Air Service Regiment (SASR) contingent
  - Evacuation handling teams
  - Approximately 50 additional medical staff, largely from 1 HSB, providing a level 3 surgical capability
  - A Sea King Helicopter.
- HMAS Success

=== Army ===
- Four Blackhawk helicopters
- Commando contingent
- SASR contingent
- Medical team from 1 HSB
- Amphibious Beach Team (ABT) from the 10th Force Support Battalion

=== RAAF ===
- Single AP-3C Orion, based at Pago Pago, American Samoa
- Multiple C-130 Hercules and Boeing 707s, based around Sydney, Australia
