= HMAS Kanimbla =

Two ships of the Royal Australian Navy have been named HMAS Kanimbla, for the Kanimbla Valley in the Blue Mountains of New South Wales:

- HMAS Kanimbla (F23), a passenger liner launched in 1935, requisitioned by the Royal Navy as an armed merchant cruiser in 1939, converted into a RAN landing ship in 1943, and returned to owners in 1950
- HMAS Kanimbla (L 51), an amphibious transport ship acquired from the United States in 1994 and decommissioned in 2011

== Battle honours ==
Ships named HMAS Kanimbla are entitled to carry seven battle honours:

- New Guinea 1944
- Leyte Gulf 1944
- Lingayen Gulf 1945
- Borneo 1945
- Pacific 1945
- Persian Gulf 2001–03
- Iraq 2003
