= HMAS Manoora (L 52) =

1970 Kanimbla-class landing platform amphibious

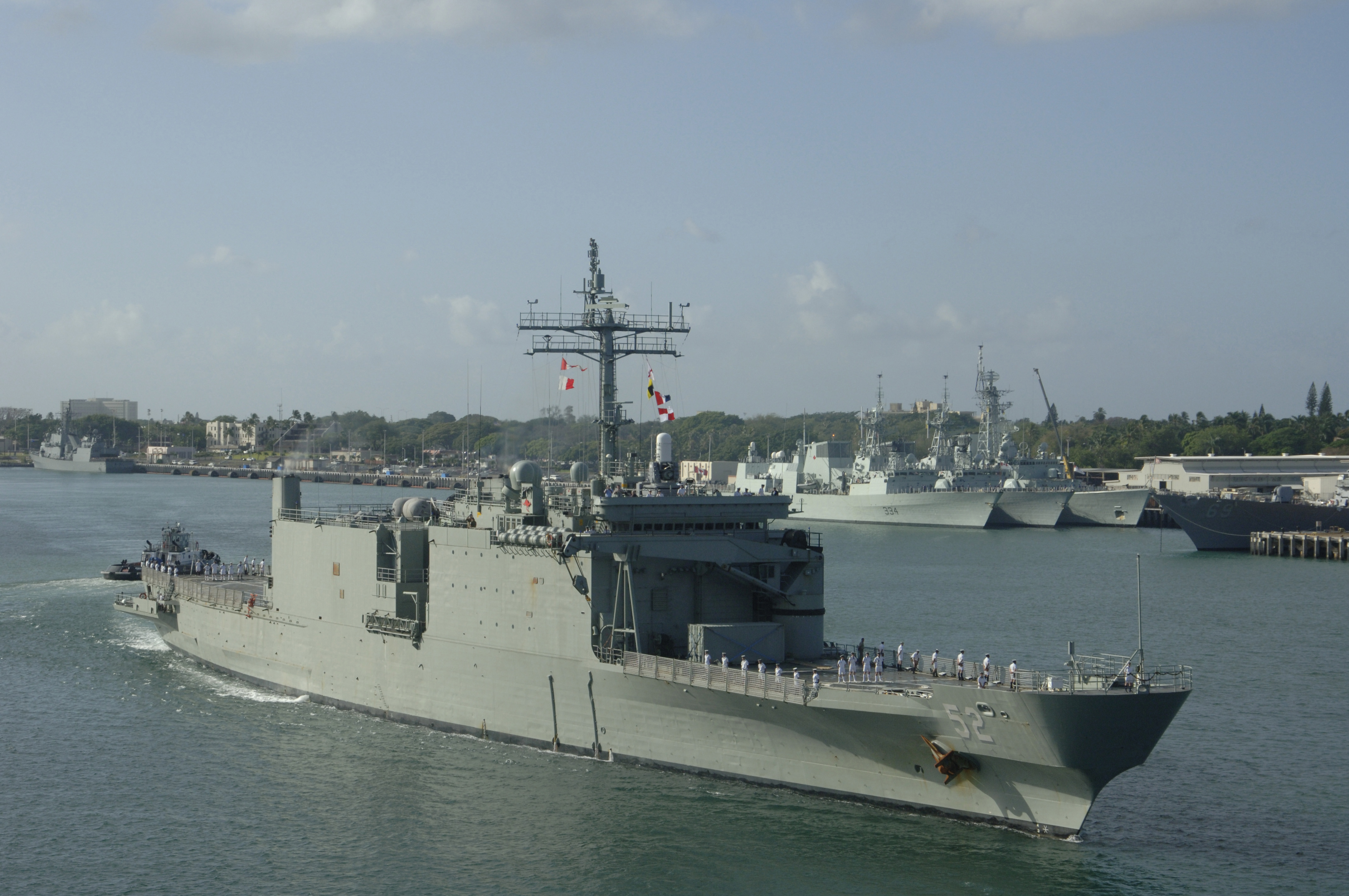
- HMAS Manoora during 2006

History

United States
- Name: Fairfax County
- Namesake: Fairfax County, Virginia
- Ordered: 15 July 1966
- Builder: National Steel & Shipbuilding Company
- Laid down: 28 March 1970
- Launched: 19 December 1970
- Commissioned: 16 October 1971
- Decommissioned: 17 August 1994
- Stricken: 17 August 1994
- Identification: LST-1193
- Fate: Disposed of through the Security Assistance Program (SAP), 27 September 1994

Australia
- Name: Manoora
- Acquired: 27 September 1994
- Commissioned: 25 November 1994
- Decommissioned: 27 May 2011
- Home port: Fleet Base East
- Identification: L 52
- Motto: "In War And Peace"
- Honours and awards: Battle honours: Persian Gulf 2002; Plus six inherited battle honours
- Fate: Sold for scrap, 20 May 2013
- Badge

General characteristics as Manoora
- Class & type: Kanimbla-class landing platform amphibious
- Displacement: 8,534 tons
- Length: 159.2 m (522 ft 4 in)
- Beam: 21.2 m (69 ft 7 in)
- Draught: 5.3 m (17 ft 5 in)
- Propulsion: 6 × ALCO V16 diesel engines, 2,050 kW (2,750 hp) each driving two shafts (3 engines per shaft)
- Speed: 22 knots (41 km/h; 25 mph)
- Range: 14,000 nmi (26,000 km; 16,000 mi) at 14 knots (26 km/h; 16 mph)
- Boats & landing craft carried: 2 × LCM8 landing craft
- Capacity: 450 embarked forces, 955 m^{2} (10,280 sq ft) of usable tank deck space
- Complement: 23 naval officers, 2 army officers, 197 sailors, 18 soldiers
- Armament: 1 × 20 mm (0.8 in) Phalanx Mk 15 close-in weapon system; 6 × 12.7 mm (0.5 in) machine guns; 4 × MK36 SRBOC launcher
- Aircraft carried: 4 × Blackhawk or 3 × Sea King

HMAS Manoora (L 52) was a Kanimbla-class landing platform amphibious ship operated by the Royal Australian Navy (RAN). Originally built for the United States Navy (USN) as the Newport-class tank landing ship USS Fairfax County (LST-1193), the ship was decommissioned in 1994 and sold to the RAN.

Although commissioned into Australian service in that year, the vessel was heavily modified from her original design, and did not begin operations until the end of the decade. During her Australian career, Manoora saw wartime service during the War in Afghanistan, and non-combat service in the Solomon Islands and East Timor. In 2001, the ship was involved in the Tampa affair, a diplomatic incident involving a Norwegian cargo ship and a group of asylum seekers.

In late 2010, Manoora and sister ship Kanimbla were placed in an 'operational pause' after several problems were identified with the ships. In early 2011, it was announced that repairing Manoora was cost-prohibitive, and she was decommissioned on 27 May 2011. The ship was sold for breaking in 2013.

== Construction ==
The ship was constructed for the USN as a Newport-class tank landing ship by the National Steel & Shipbuilding Company at San Diego, California.

== Transfer and conversion ==
In the early 1990s, the RAN initiated a procurement project to replace HMAS Jervis Bay with a dedicated training and helicopter support ship. Meeting the vague specifications of the project required a purpose-built vessel at an approximate cost of A$500 million. The high cost of the project led to its cancellation by the Minister for Defence in 1993, with the instructions to find a cheaper alternative. At around the same time, the USN began plans to decommission fifteen of their twenty Newport-class tank landing ships, including Fairfax County, and offering them for purchase by various countries.

In 1994, the RAN elected to purchase two Newports: Fairfax County and Saginaw for the combined price of A$61 million (US$40 million), with the intention of converting each into a combined pocket helicopter carrier and amphibious warfare transport. Fairfax County was to travel to Australia with a USN crew before decommissioning and recommissioning as HMAS Manoora.

On 28 June 1994, when Saginaw was due to decommission and recommission as HMAS Kanimbla, it was announced that the United States Congress had decided not to release any of the fifteen Newports into foreign service as the United States Senate Committee on Armed Services was attempting to pressure US President Bill Clinton on the perceived running-down of the USN's amphibious warfare capability, while an unrelated Senator had expressed concern over human rights in Morocco (one of the other eight nations slated to acquire a ship). The sale to Australia was not approved until the start of August, with Fairfax County arriving in Sydney in September and handed over to the RAN on 27 September 1994. She was commissioned into the RAN on 25 November 1994.

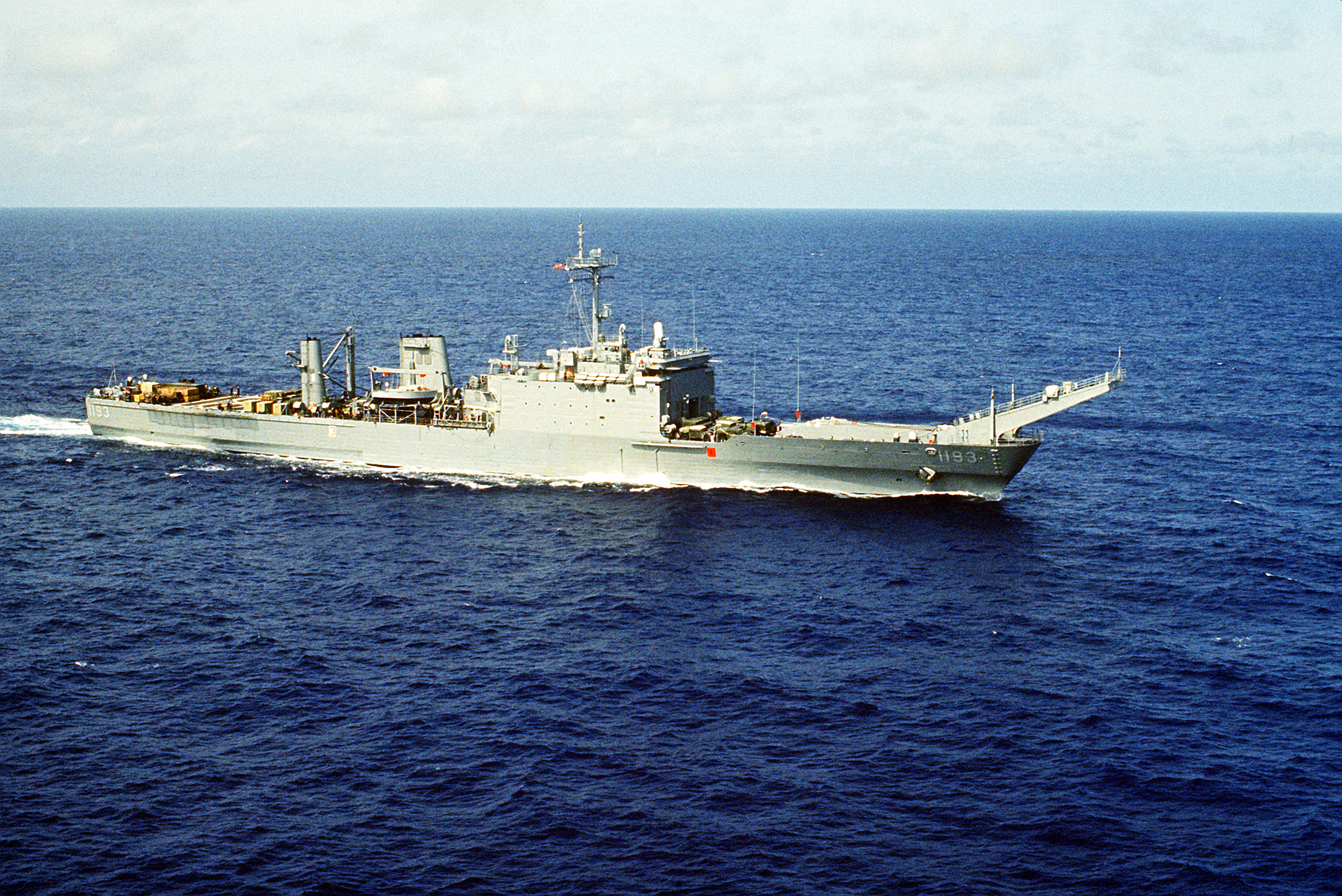
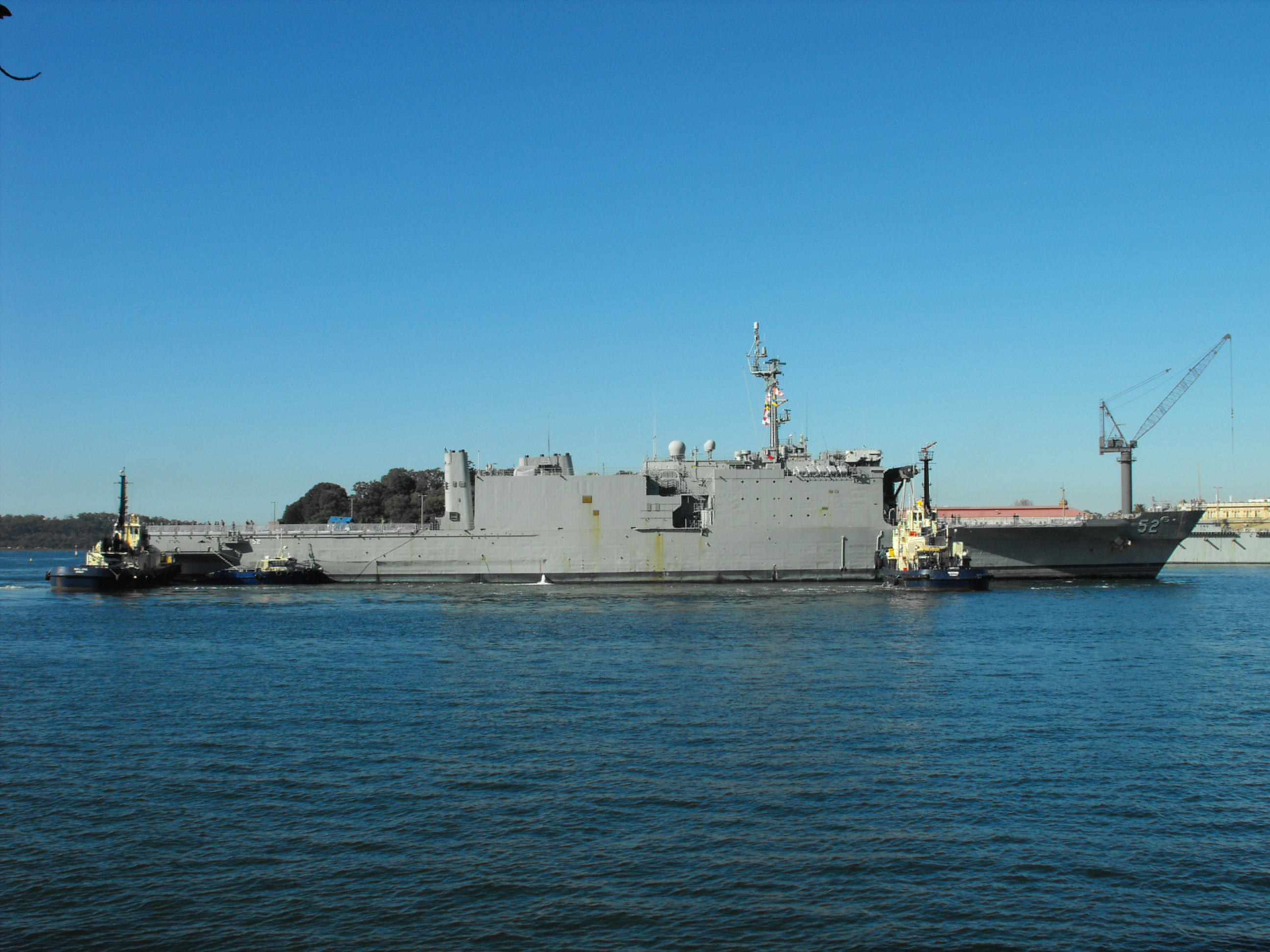
Starboard bow views of Manoora, showing her pre-conversion (left, as Fairfax County) and post-conversion (right) profiles.

After both ships had arrived in Australia and were commissioned, Kanimbla and Manoora spent two years docked at Fleet Base East before they were moved to Forgacs Shipyard, Newcastle in June 1996, where they underwent conversion from tank landing ships to amphibious warfare transports. The conversion required the main features of the Newport class, the bow doors, derrick, and tank ramp, to be removed. A hangar for three Sea King or four Blackhawk helicopters was added, while the aft helicopter deck was reinforced. Chinook helicopters are able to land and take off from the aft deck, but cannot be carried for prolonged periods. The deck forward of the superstructure was converted to carry two LCM-8 landing craft, which are launched and recovered by a single 70-ton crane. When the LCM-8s are deployed, the area functions as a third helicopter landing spot. Accommodation was provided for up to 450 soldiers, while improved medical facilities and an upgraded galley were also installed.

The refit was planned to last from 1995 to 1996, with Manoora upgraded first. However, extensive corrosion was discovered in both ships. The now controversial refit cost for the two ships increased A$400 million, with half of the funding taken from repair and refit allocations for other ships.

== Operational history ==
In April 1999, while the modification was being completed, personnel from Manoora, Kanimbla, and Sydney bases assisted the New South Wales Department of Agriculture in containing an outbreak of Newcastle disease in Mangrove Mountain poultry farms. Manoora entered service in January 2000. Manoora and HMAS Tobruk were deployed to the Solomon Islands in June 2000, to rescue civilians following a coup d'état. During September and October, Manoora was involved in security operations for the 2000 Summer Olympics. In November, she returned to the Solomon Islands to support the International Peace Monitoring Team following the signing of the Townsville Peace Agreement, remained in the region until late December, then returned for a second deployment between March and June 2001.

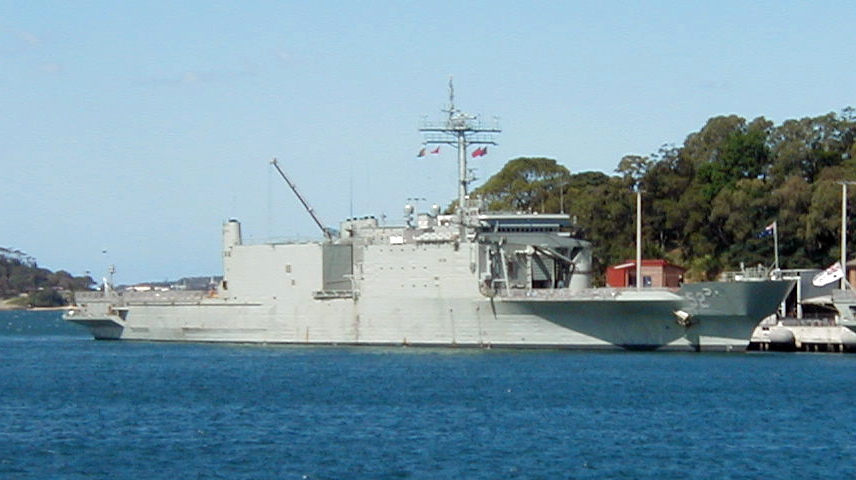
Manoora docked at Fleet Base East in October 2001

In late August 2001, Manoora became involved in the 'Tampa Affair', a political incident caused when the Australian government forbade the Norwegian cargo ship MV Tampa, carrying asylum seekers rescued from a damaged vessel in the Timor Sea, from entering Australian waters. The 438 asylum seekers were transferred from Tampa to Manoora, which then delivered them to detention centres on Nauru.

From 28 February to 24 June 2002, the ship operated in the Persian Gulf as part of Operation Slipper, the Australian involvement in the War in Afghanistan. For most of the deployment, Manoora was assigned as the Khwar Abd Allah gatekeeper vessel, and was the primary source of boarding parties for ship inspections in the area, with 27 compliant and 4 forced boardings performed.

The ship returned to the Gulf in May 2003 under Operation Falconer, the Australian commitment to the invasion of Iraq, and spent a month in the region before sailing home with Australian personnel and equipment embarked. During the return voyage, the ship rescued eight Iraqi fishermen from the middle of the Gulf. During late June, Manoora provided medical assistance to the fishing vessel Golden Sun . In July 2003, Manoora sailed to the Solomon Islands with 300 personnel from 2nd Battalion, Royal Australian Regiment; the start of the Regional Assistance Mission to Solomon Islands. The ship remained in the region until late October, serving as a logistic and medical support base, and as a venue for meetings. In September, Manoora was used to recover an Iroquois helicopter of the Royal New Zealand Air Force downed off Guadalcanal.

Manoora undertook an extensive refit during April and May 2004.

During May 2006, the ship was deployed to East Timor under Operation Astute.

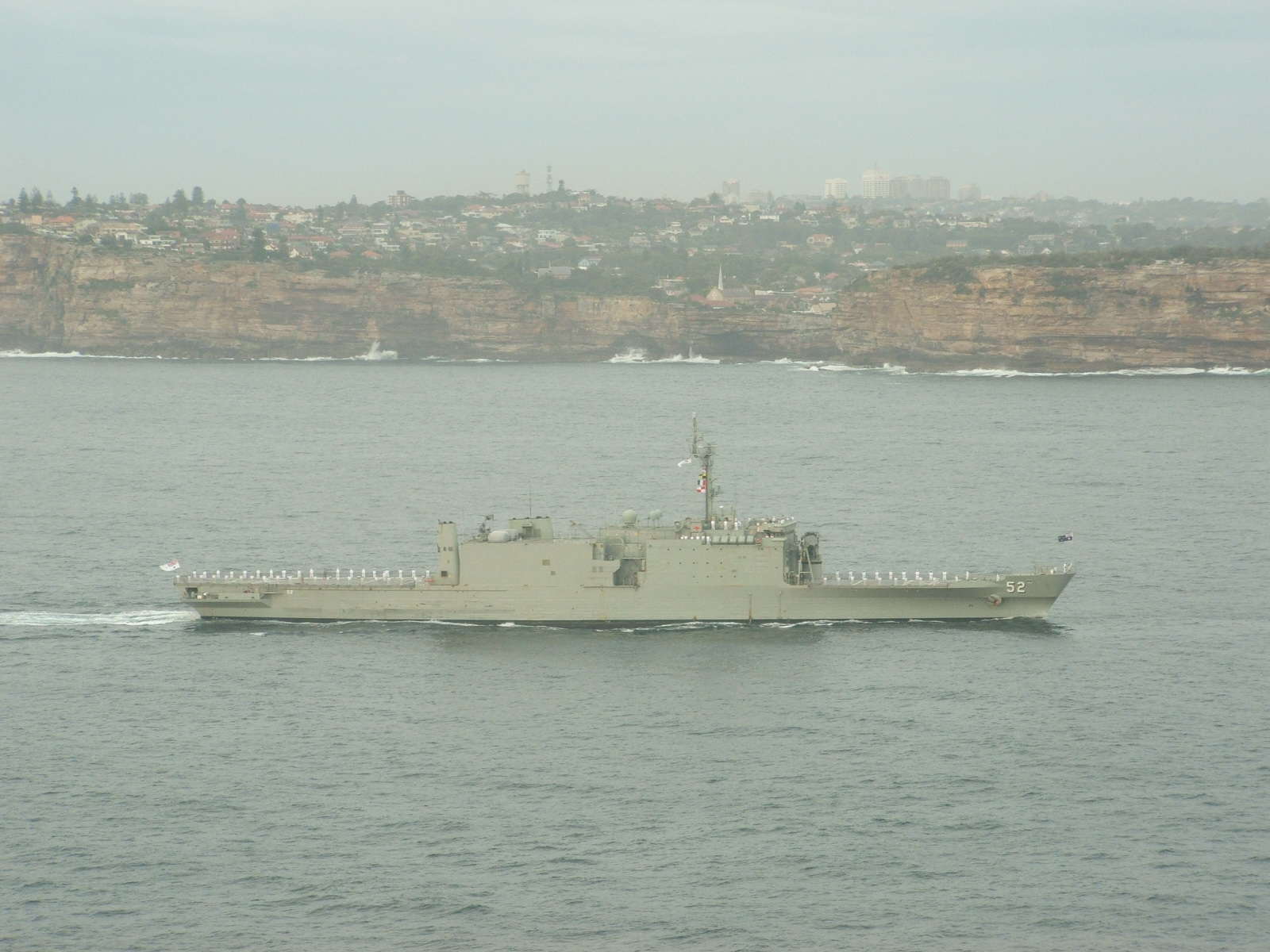
HMAS Manoora entering Sydney Harbour on the morning of 13 March 2009

On the morning of 13 March 2009, Manoora was one of seventeen warships involved in a ceremonial fleet entry and fleet review in Sydney Harbour, the largest collection of RAN ships since the Australian Bicentenary in 1988. Manoora was one of the thirteen ships involved in the ceremonial entry through Sydney Heads, and anchored in the harbour for the review.

Following a review of the RAN battle honours system, completed in March 2010, Manoora was retroactively awarded the honour "Persian Gulf 2002", in addition to the six honours inherited from the previous ship of the name.

== Decommissioning and fate ==
In late September 2010, Manoora and sister ship Kanimbla were brought to Fleet Base East for an 'operational pause' after several problems were identified with the ships. These included large quantities of ongoing corrosion, faults with the deck crane and alarm system, overhauls of the propulsion, power generators, and air-conditioning, and upgrades to the communication suite. The ships were to be confined to base until after the ships complete a dry-docking initially valued at A$17 million: as of October 2010, tenders for the work were yet to be released. The problems have been attributed to the ship's high operational tempo, delays in maintenance, and the age of the ships.

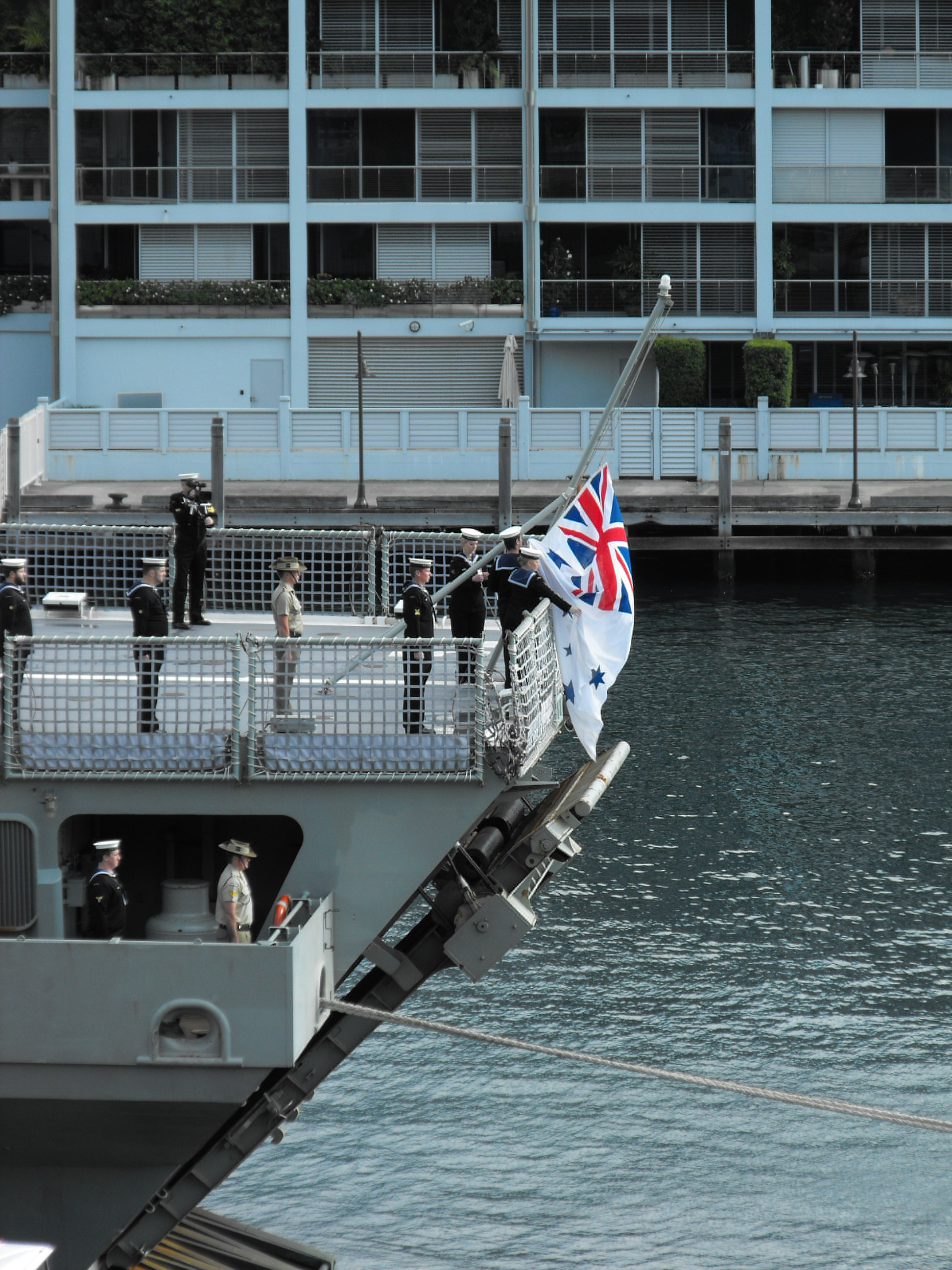
The Australian White Ensign being lowered for the final time during Manoora's decommissioning ceremony

On 1 February 2011, the Minister for Defence announced that repairing Manoora would not be cost effective given that this would cost A$20 million, and not be complete until mid-2012. As the ship was scheduled to retire at the end of 2012, it was instead decided to decommission her during 2011 without returning her to service. Manoora was decommissioned at Fleet Base East on 27 May 2011. Personnel from Manoora were transferred to the former British Royal Fleet Auxiliary ship RFA Largs Bay when she arrived in Australia in late 2011, and the Canberra-class amphibious assault ships when they entered service from 2014.

In June 2012, the federal government offered Manoora and Kanimbla to the Queensland state government for scuttling as dive wrecks off the Queensland coast. However, the government chose not to go ahead with this, as it would cost $4 million each to prepare them for scuttling, and could provoke similar reactions to the contested sinking of the frigate HMAS Adelaide. Instead, Manoora was to be broken up, with an estimated scrap metal value of $2.5 million. Because the two vessels were originally owned by the United States and were sold to Australia, their disposal had to receive US government approval and comply with International Traffic in Arms Regulations. Tendering for the disposal of the vessels began in June 2012, with the contract awarded to Southern Scrap Recycling on 20 May 2013. The two vessels were returned to the United States, and broken up in New Orleans.
