= HMAS Manoora =

Two ships of the Royal Australian Navy have been named HMAS Manoora:

- HMAS Manoora (F48), a passenger liner launched in 1934, requisitioned by the RAN in 1939 for use as an armed merchant cruiser and later a landing ship, and returned to her owners in 1949
- HMAS Manoora (L 52), an amphibious transport ship acquired from the United States in 1994 and decommissioned in 2011

== Battle honours ==
Ships named HMAS Manoora are entitled to carry seven battle honours:

- Indian Ocean 1941–42
- Pacific 1942–45
- New Guinea 1944
- Leyte Gulf 1944
- Lingayen Gulf 1945
- Borneo 1945
- Persian Gulf 2002
