= Operation Sumatra Assist =

Australian disaster relief operation after the 2004 Indian Ocean earthquake and tsunami

Operation Sumatra Assist was the Australian Defence Force's (ADFs) contribution to disaster relief in Indonesia following the 2004 Indian Ocean earthquake. ADF personnel were deployed within hours of the earthquake. They served mainly in Aceh. Medical, communications and engineering staff were prominent, with Army and Air Force helicopters and cargo aircraft, supported offshore by HMAS Kanimbla and its two Sea King helicopters.

The personnel were primarily based at Aceh airfield and at the headquarters in nearby Medan. The camp at Banda Aceh was located directly adjacent to the hardstand of Aceh's airfield.

== Phase 2 ==
At about 09:30UTC 2 April 2005, Sea King helicopter with call sign "Shark 02" crashed on the island of Nias, off the west coast of Sumatra during the humanitarian efforts in the aftermath of the 2005 Nias–Simeulue earthquake. Nine Australian Defence Force personnel = seven men and two women - were killed; 6 Navy and 3 Air Force personnel. Two others were recovered alive from the site by the other Sea King operating from HMAS Kanimbla and transferred to it for medical assistance in its hospital facilities.News conference: INDONESIA: NINE AUSTRALIAN MILITARY PERSONNEL PRESUMED DEAD
