= USS Saginaw (LST-1188) =

Newport-class tank landing ship

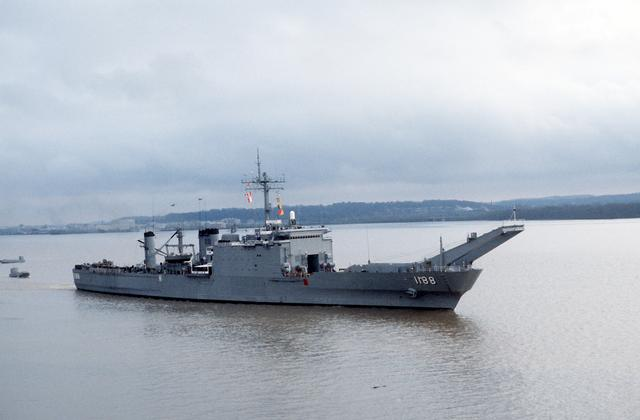
- USS Saginaw in 1987

History

United States
- Name: Saginaw
- Namesake: Saginaw River
- Ordered: 15 July 1966
- Builder: National Steel and Shipbuilding Company, San Diego, California
- Laid down: 24 May 1969
- Launched: 7 February 1970
- Sponsored by: Wife of R. James Harvey
- Commissioned: 23 January 1971
- Decommissioned: 28 June 1994
- Stricken: 28 June 1994
- Identification: LST-1188
- Fate: Sold to Royal Australian Navy as HMAS Kanimbla

Australia
- Name: Kanimbla
- Namesake: Kanimbla Valley
- Acquired: 1994
- Commissioned: 29 August 1994
- Decommissioned: 25 November 2011
- Identification: L 51
- Fate: Sold for scrap, 20 May 2013

General characteristics as built
- Class & type: Newport-class tank landing ship
- Displacement: 4,793 long tons (4,870 t) light; 8,342 long tons (8,476 t) full load
- Length: 522 ft 4 in (159.2 m) oa; 562 ft (171.3 m) over derrick arms
- Beam: 69 ft 6 in (21.2 m)
- Draft: 17 ft 6 in (5.3 m) max
- Propulsion: 2 shafts; 6 Alco diesel engines (3 per shaft); 16,500 shp (12,300 kW); Bow thruster
- Speed: 22 knots (41 km/h; 25 mph) max
- Range: 2,500 nmi (4,600 km; 2,900 mi) at 14 knots (26 km/h; 16 mph)
- Troops: 431 max
- Complement: 213
- Sensors & processing systems: 2 × Mk 63 GCFS; SPS-10 radar
- Armament: 2 × twin 3"/50 caliber guns
- Aviation facilities: Helicopter deck

USS Saginaw (LST-1188) was the tenth of the Newport-class tank landing ships of the United States Navy which replaced the traditional bow door-design tank landing ships (LSTs). The second ship of that name, Saginaw was named after the river in Michigan. The LST was constructed by National Steel and Shipbuilding Company of San Diego, California, launched in 1970 and commissioned in 1971. During service with the United States Navy, the ship took part in US efforts in the Lebanese civil war and the Gulf War. Saginaw was decommissioned on 28 June 1994 and was transferred to the Royal Australian Navy on 28 August that year.

Recommissioned as HMAS Kanimbla (L 51), the LST underwent a major refit removing its bow ramps and using a crane to load and unload the vessel. The ship was retired from Australian service in 2011 after being replaced by HMAS Choules. The ship was towed back to the United States and broken up for scrap at New Orleans, Louisiana in 2013.

== Design and description ==
Saginaw was a Newport-class tank landing ship which were designed to meet the goal put forward by the United States amphibious forces to have a tank landing ship (LST) capable of over 20 knots (37 km/h; 23 mph). However, the traditional bow door form for LSTs would not be capable. Therefore, the designers of the Newport class came up with a design of a traditional ship hull with a 112-foot (34 m) aluminum ramp slung over the bow supported by two derrick arms. The 34-long-ton (35 t) ramp was capable of sustaining loads up to 75 long tons (76 t). This made the Newport class the first to depart from the standard LST design that had been developed in early World War II.

The LST had a displacement of 4,793 long tons (4,870 t) when light and 8,342 long tons (8,476 t) at full load. Saginaw was 522 feet 4 inches (159.2 m) long overall and 562 ft (171.3 m) over the derrick arms which protruded past the bow. The vessel had a beam of 69 ft 6 in (21.2 m), a draft forward of 11 ft 5 in (3.5 m) and 17 ft 5 in (5.3 m) at the stern at full load.

Saginaw was fitted with six Alco 16-645-ES diesel engines turning two shafts, three to each shaft. The system was rated at 16,500 brake horsepower (12,300 kW) and gave the ship a maximum speed of 22 knots (41 km/h; 25 mph) for short periods and could only sustain 20 knots (37 km/h; 23 mph) for an extended length of time. The LST carried 1,750 long tons (1,780 t) of diesel fuel for a range of 2,500 nautical miles (4,600 km; 2,900 mi) at the cruising speed of 14 knots (26 km/h; 16 mph). The ship was also equipped with a bow thruster to allow for better maneuvering near causeways and to hold position while offshore during the unloading of amphibious vehicles.

The Newport class were larger and faster than previous LSTs and were able to transport tanks, heavy vehicles and engineer groups and supplies that were too large for helicopters or smaller landing craft to carry. The LSTs have a ramp forward of the superstructure that connects the lower tank deck with the main deck and a passage large enough to allow access to the parking area amidships. The vessels are also equipped with a stern gate to allow the unloading of amphibious vehicles directly into the water or to unload onto a utility landing craft (LCU) or pier. At either end of the tank deck there is a 30 ft (9.1 m) turntable that permits vehicles to turn around without having to reverse. The Newport class has the capacity for 500 long tons (510 t) of vehicles, 19,000 ft^{2} (1,800 m^{2}) of cargo area and could carry up to 431 troops. The vessels also have davits for four vehicle and personnel landing craft (LCVPs) and could carry four pontoon causeway sections along the sides of the hull.

Saginaw was initially armed with four Mark 33 3-inch (76 mm)/50 caliber guns in two twin turrets. The vessel was equipped with two Mk 63 gun control fire systems (GCFS) for the 3-inch guns, but these were removed in 1977–1978. The ship also had SPS-10 surface search radar. Atop the stern gate, the vessels mounted a helicopter deck. They had a maximum complement of 213 including 11 officers.

== Construction and career ==
=== United States Navy service ===
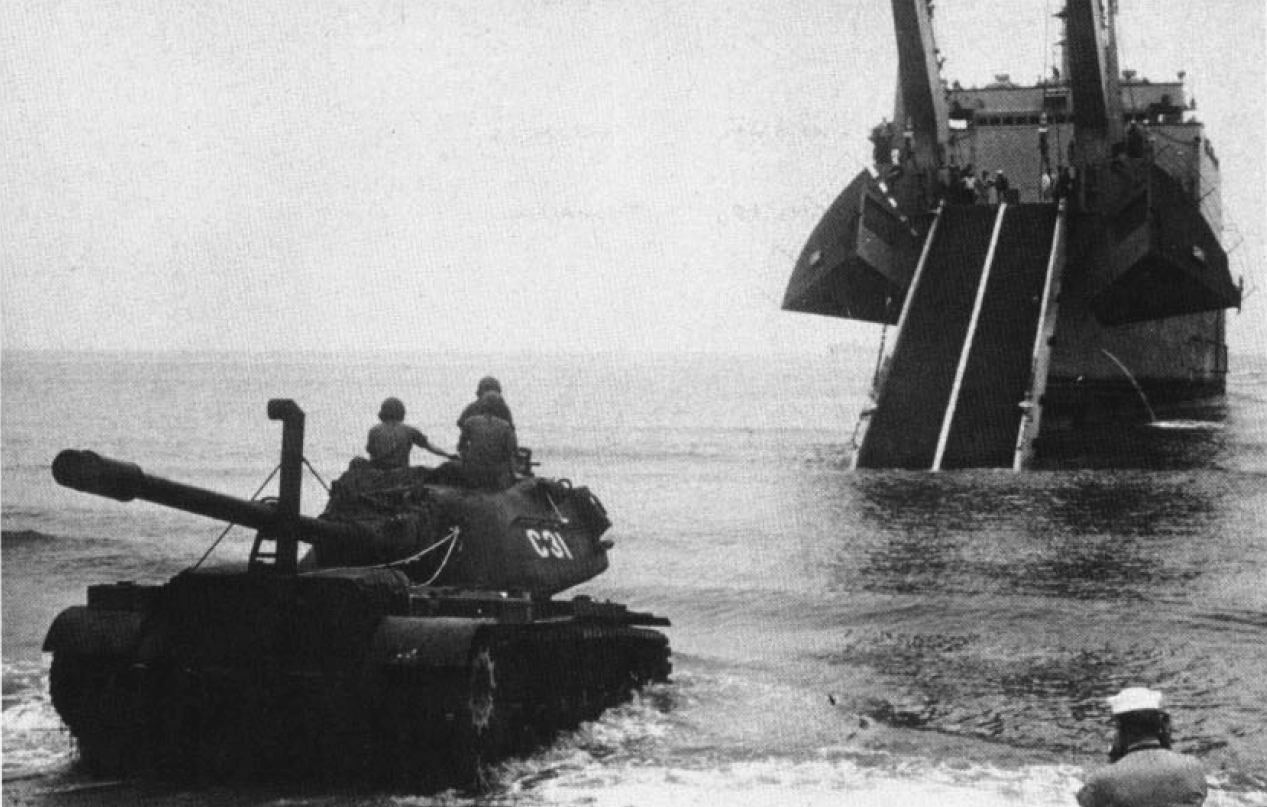
An M103 heavy tank approaches the ramp of Saginaw c. 1973.

The LST was ordered as the first hull of the third group in Fiscal Year 1967 on 15 July 1966. The ship was laid down on 24 May 1969 by the National Steel and Shipbuilding Company, in San Diego, California. Named for a river in Michigan, Saginaw was launched on 7 February 1970, sponsored by the wife of Congressman James Harvey of Michigan. The vessel was commissioned into the United States Navy at the Long Beach Naval Shipyard on 23 January 1971.

Saginaw departed San Diego on 4 March 1971, bound for the United States East Coast to a new home port. Soon after starting the journey, the ship's lookouts sighted a mechanized landing craft, LCM(6)-805, adrift at sea. The LST took the drifting craft in tow, and later, turned her over to USS Point Defiance. Following that incident, Saginaw proceeded to NAB Little Creek, Virginia via Acapulco, Mexico, and the Panama Canal arriving on 26 March. Early in April, while preparing for shakedown, the ship tested a new concept for the Newport class by hoisting a major self-contained medical unit (MUST) onto the tank deck. This was done to evaluate the feasibility of setting up complete hospital facilities on a Newport-class deck after offloading troops, vehicles, and cargo. The vessel performed shakedown and routine operations for the rest of the year.

On 16 January 1972 Saginaw departed Little Creek to participate in Operation "Snowy Beach" with Amphibious Squadron 8 at Reid State Park Beach, Maine. On 28 January the exercise ended, and on 23 February the LST embarked Marines at Morehead City, North Carolina and sailed for the Mediterranean Sea to join the 6th Fleet. For the next five months, Saginaw participated in six amphibious exercises at various points across the Mediterranean. The LST left the 6th Fleet in early August, and returned to Morehead City to debark Marines on 21 August before sailing for Little Creek. Saginaw resumed routine operations for the remainder of the year.

Saginaw made two voyages to Vieques Island, Puerto Rico, in January and early February 1973, to transport Marines to and from exercises held on that island. Beginning in March the LST began a series of deployments to the Caribbean Sea for training and international naval exercises as part of the Caribbean Amphibious Ready Group. Saginaw returned to Little Creek on 6 December and was inactive for all of 1973. Saginaw spent the first four months of 1974 in local operations out of Little Creek. On 10 May 1974 the LST embarked Marines at Morehead City, then got underway for Rota, Spain to rejoin the 6th Fleet. Saginaw arrived at Rota on 20 May, and through June, was underway in the Mediterranean.

Saginaw was assigned to the Apollo 17 recovery mission in 1972. The vessel took part in the multi-national exercise Display Determination with NATO in 1977. The LST aided in the inter-fleet transfer of the experimental hydrofoil USS Pegasus in 1979 and supported Cuban refugee operations in 1980.

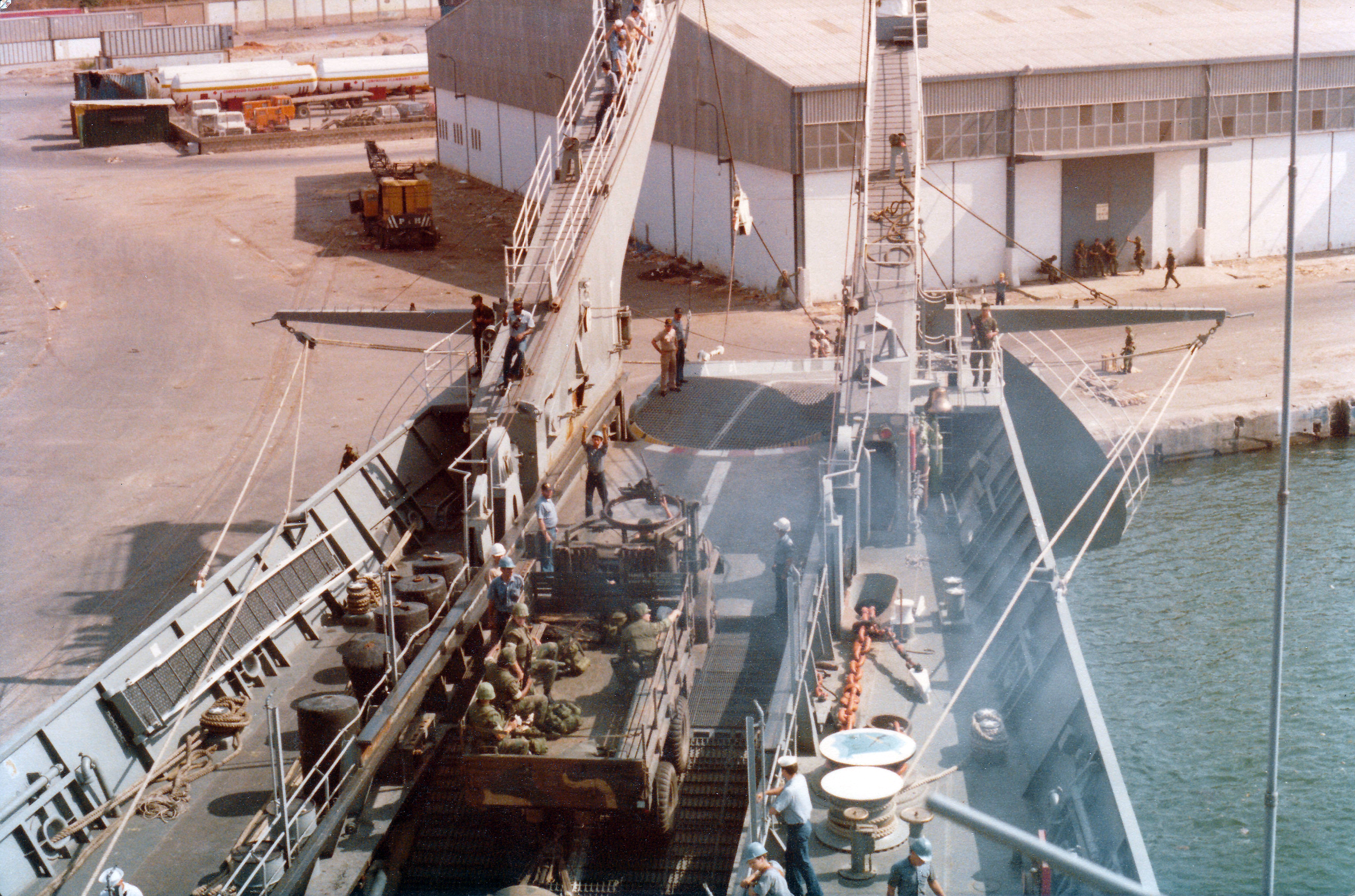
Saginaw at Beirut in 1982

In May 1982 five ships of Amphibious Squadron 4 with 1,800 Marines from the 32nd Marine Amphibious Unit (32nd MAU) deployed to the Mediterranean with the detachment being designated Mediterranean Amphibious Ready Group 2-82 (MARG 2-82). (Note: The five ships were USS Guam, USS Nashville, USS Hermitage, USS Manitowoc and Saginaw) MARG 2-82 arrived at Rota on 6 June and were swiftly redirected to the Lebanese coast to evacuate civilians after Israel had attacked the nation earlier that day. On 24 June 1982, during the Lebanese civil war, 800 civilians were evacuated from Juniyah, Lebanon by MARG 2-82 ships. On 28 August and 29 September, Saginaw entered Beirut harbor to provide vehicles and personnel for the Multi-National Force. By 29 October, a relief force had arrived to replace MARG 2-82 in the area, and the unit sailed for the United States on 1 November. Saginaw participated in the military exercises Cold Winter 1983, Eastern Wind 87, and Teamwork 88 with NATO forces.

During the Gulf War, Saginaw was part of Transit Group 2, tasked with transporting part of the 4th Marine Expeditionary Brigade via the Mediterranean to the Persian Gulf. (Note: Transit Group 2 was composed of USS Nassau, USS Raleigh, USS Pensacola and Saginaw.) Transit Group 2 departed Morehead City on 20 August 1990 and united with the other transit groups off Masirah Island on 16 September. Transit Group 2 joined Amphibious Group 2 (PhibGru2). PhibGru2 was split back into respective transit groups on 24 March 1991 and Transit Group 2 returned to Camp Lejeune, North Carolina on 17 April after a ceasefire had been declared on 1 April. This was followed by involvement in the exercises Philblex and Display Determination and participation in US Marine Corps' BASCOLEX. Saginaw was decommissioned on 28 June 1994 and struck from the U.S. Naval Vessel Register the same day. Saginaw was sold to Australia as part of the Security Assistance Program. However, delays in the authorization of the sale by the US government led to Kanimbla's transferral only on 24 August 1994.

=== Royal Australian Navy service ===
Saginaw was renamed HMAS Kanimbla (L 51) in Australian service and commissioned into the Royal Australian Navy on 29 August at Norfolk, Virginia. Kanimbla underwent conversion in May 1995 at Forgacs Shipbuilding, Newcastle, New South Wales. The LST was significantly modified by removing its bow ramps and adding another deck over the bow of the ship, allowing for a third landing spot and increased aviation fuel capacity. Over the new deck two LCM-8 landing craft were carried when the third landing spot was not in use, and were handled by a 70-ton crane. Improved medical facilities were also constructed. A hangar was installed aft, allowing for the stowage of four Seahawk helicopters. Kanimbla was based at Sydney, Australia. Kanimbla was taken out of service in November 2011 and replaced by HMAS Choules and the Canberra-class landing helicopter docks. Kanimbla was towed back to the United States in October 2013 and arrived in New Orleans, Louisiana, for scrapping by Southern Scrap Recycling.
