= USS Fairfax County =

Tank landing ship of the United States Navy

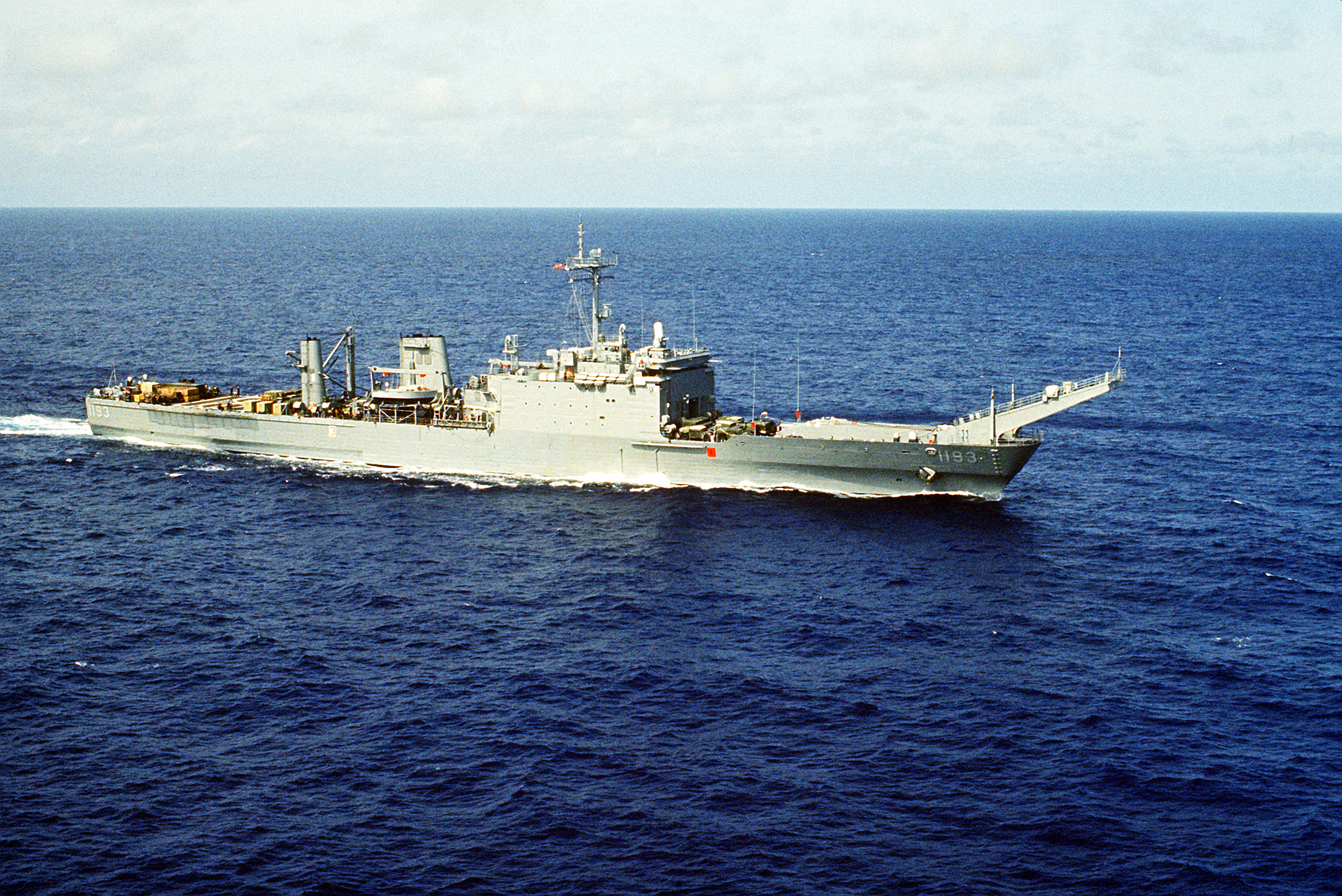
- USS Fairfax County

History

United States
- Name: Fairfax County
- Namesake: Fairfax County, Virginia
- Ordered: 15 July 1966
- Builder: National Steel and Shipbuilding Company, San Diego, California
- Laid down: 28 March 1970
- Launched: 19 December 1970
- Commissioned: 16 October 1971
- Decommissioned: 17 August 1994
- Stricken: 17 August 1994
- Identification: LST-1193
- Fate: Sold to Royal Australian Navy as HMAS Manoora

Australia
- Name: HMAS Manoora
- Acquired: 27 September 1994
- Commissioned: 25 November 1994
- Decommissioned: 27 May 2011
- Identification: L 52
- Fate: Scrapped

General characteristics as built
- Class & type: Newport-class tank landing ship
- Displacement: 4,793 long tons (4,870 t) light; 8,342 long tons (8,476 t) full load
- Length: 522 ft 4 in (159.2 m) oa; 562 ft (171.3 m) over derrick arms
- Beam: 69 ft 6 in (21.2 m)
- Draft: 17 ft 6 in (5.3 m) max
- Propulsion: 2 shafts; 6 Alco diesel engines (3 per shaft); 16,500 shp (12,300 kW); Bow thruster
- Speed: 22 knots (41 km/h; 25 mph) max
- Range: 2,500 nmi (4,600 km; 2,900 mi) at 14 knots (26 km/h; 16 mph)
- Troops: 431 max
- Complement: 213
- Sensors & processing systems: 2 × Mk 63 GCFS; SPS-10 radar
- Armament: 2 × twin 3"/50 caliber guns
- Aviation facilities: Helicopter deck

USS Fairfax County (LST-1193) was the fifteenth of twenty Newport-class tank landing ships of the United States Navy (USN) which replaced the traditional bow door-design tank landing ships (LSTs). Named after a county in Virginia, the ship was constructed by National Steel and Shipbuilding Company of San Diego, California. The LST was launched in 1970 and was commissioned into the USN in 1971. Fairfax County was alternated deployments between the Caribbean Sea and the Mediterranean Sea. During the Gulf War, Fairfax County was deployed off the northern African coast as part of a deterrent force. The ship was decommissioned from the USN in 1994.

The LST was sold to Australia and commissioned into the Royal Australian Navy as HMAS Manoora (L 52) in 1994. The ship underwent a significant refit, altering the vessel's ability to land ships over its bow. The ship remained in service until 2011, when it was decommissioned. Manoora was towed back to the United States and broken up for scrap in 2013.

== Design and description ==
Fairfax County was a Newport-class tank landing ship which were designed to meet the goal put forward by the United States amphibious forces to have a tank landing ship (LST) capable of over 20 knots (37 km/h; 23 mph). However, the traditional bow door form for LSTs would not be capable. Therefore, the designers of the Newport class came up with a design of a traditional ship hull with a 112-foot (34 m) aluminum ramp slung over the bow supported by two derrick arms. The 34-long-ton (35 t) ramp was capable of sustaining loads up to 75 long tons (76 t). This made the Newport class the first to depart from the standard LST design that had been developed in early World War II.

The LST had a displacement of 4,793 long tons (4,870 t) when light and 8,342 long tons (8,476 t) at full load. Fairfax County was 522 feet 4 inches (159.2 m) long overall and 562 ft (171.3 m) over the derrick arms which protruded past the bow. The vessel had a beam of 69 ft 6 in (21.2 m), a draft forward of 11 ft 5 in (3.5 m) and 17 ft 5 in (5.3 m) at the stern at full load.

Fairfax County was fitted with six Alco 16-645-ES diesel engines turning two shafts, three to each shaft. The system was rated at 16,500 brake horsepower (12,300 kW) and gave the ship a maximum speed of 22 knots (41 km/h; 25 mph) for short periods and could only sustain 20 knots (37 km/h; 23 mph) for an extended length of time. The LST carried 1,750 long tons (1,780 t) of diesel fuel for a range of 2,500 nautical miles (4,600 km; 2,900 mi) at the cruising speed of 14 knots (26 km/h; 16 mph). The ship was also equipped with a bow thruster to allow for better maneuvering near causeways and to hold position while offshore during the unloading of amphibious vehicles.

The Newport class were larger and faster than previous LSTs and were able to transport tanks, heavy vehicles and engineer groups and supplies that were too large for helicopters or smaller landing craft to carry. The LSTs have a ramp forward of the superstructure that connects the lower tank deck with the main deck and a passage large enough to allow access to the parking area amidships. The vessels are also equipped with a stern gate to allow the unloading of amphibious vehicles directly into the water or to unload onto a utility landing craft (LCU) or pier. At either end of the tank deck there is a 30 ft (9.1 m) turntable that permits vehicles to turn around without having to reverse. The Newport class has the capacity for 500 long tons (510 t) of vehicles, 19,000 ft^{2} (1,800 m^{2}) of cargo area and could carry up to 431 troops. The vessels also have davits for four vehicle and personnel landing craft (LCVPs) and could carry four pontoon causeway sections along the sides of the hull.

Fairfax County was initially armed with four Mark 33 3-inch (76 mm)/50 caliber guns in two twin turrets. The vessel was equipped with two Mk 63 gun control fire systems (GCFS) for the 3-inch guns, but these were removed in 1977–1978. The ship also had SPS-10 surface search radar. Atop the stern gate, the vessels mounted a helicopter deck. They had a maximum complement of 213 including 11 officers.

== Construction and career ==
=== United States Navy service ===
The LST was ordered as the sixth hull of the third group of the Newport class in Fiscal Year 1967 and a contract was awarded on 15 July 1966. The ship was laid down on 28 March 1970 at San Diego, California, by the National Steel and Shipbuilding Company. Fairfax County was named for a county of that name in Virginia and launched on 19 December 1970, sponsored by the wife of James W. O'Grady. The vessel was commissioned on 16 October 1971 and assigned to Amphibious Force, Atlantic Fleet.

Fairfax County departed San Diego for the ship's new home port, Little Creek, Virginia via the Panama Canal. Into 1980, the tank landing ship alternated amphibious training operations along the east coast of the United States and in the Caribbean Sea with regular, extended deployments to the Mediterranean Sea. During the Gulf War, Fairfax County was one of three ships that comprised Marine Amphibious Ready Group 3-90 (MARG 3-90). MARG 3-90 was kept in the Mediterranean as a show of force to possible belligerent African nations while the United States was occupied in the Persian Gulf. MARG 3-90 departed Camp Lejeune, North Carolina on 7 August 1990 with a United States Marine Corps detachment and returned to Little Creek on 5 March 1991. Fairfax County was decommissioned and struck from the Naval Vessel Register on 17 August 1994. Fairfax County's bell is on display at the Fairfax County Government Center in Fairfax, Virginia.

=== Royal Australian Navy service ===
The LST was sold to the Royal Australian Navy as part of the Security Assistance Program on 27 September 1994. The ship was recommissioned as HMAS Manoora (L 52) on 25 November 1994 at Sydney, Australia. Manoora underwent conversion in May 1995 at Forgacs Shipbuilding, Newcastle, New South Wales. The LST was significantly modified by removing its bow ramps and adding another deck over the bow of the ship, allowing for a third landing spot and increased aviation fuel capacity. Over the new deck two LCM-8 landing craft were carried when the third landing spot was not in use, and were handled by a 70-ton crane. Improved medical facilities were also constructed. A hangar was installed aft, allowing for the stowage of four Seahawk helicopters. Manoora was based at Sydney. Manoora was taken out of service on 27 May 2011 and replaced by HMAS Choules and the Canberra-class landing helicopter docks. Manoora was towed back to the United States in October 2013 and arrived in New Orleans, Louisiana, for scrapping by Southern Scrap Recycling.
