= 2005 Nias Island Sea King crash =

2005 aviation accident

Coordinates: 0°45′09″N 97°42′14″E

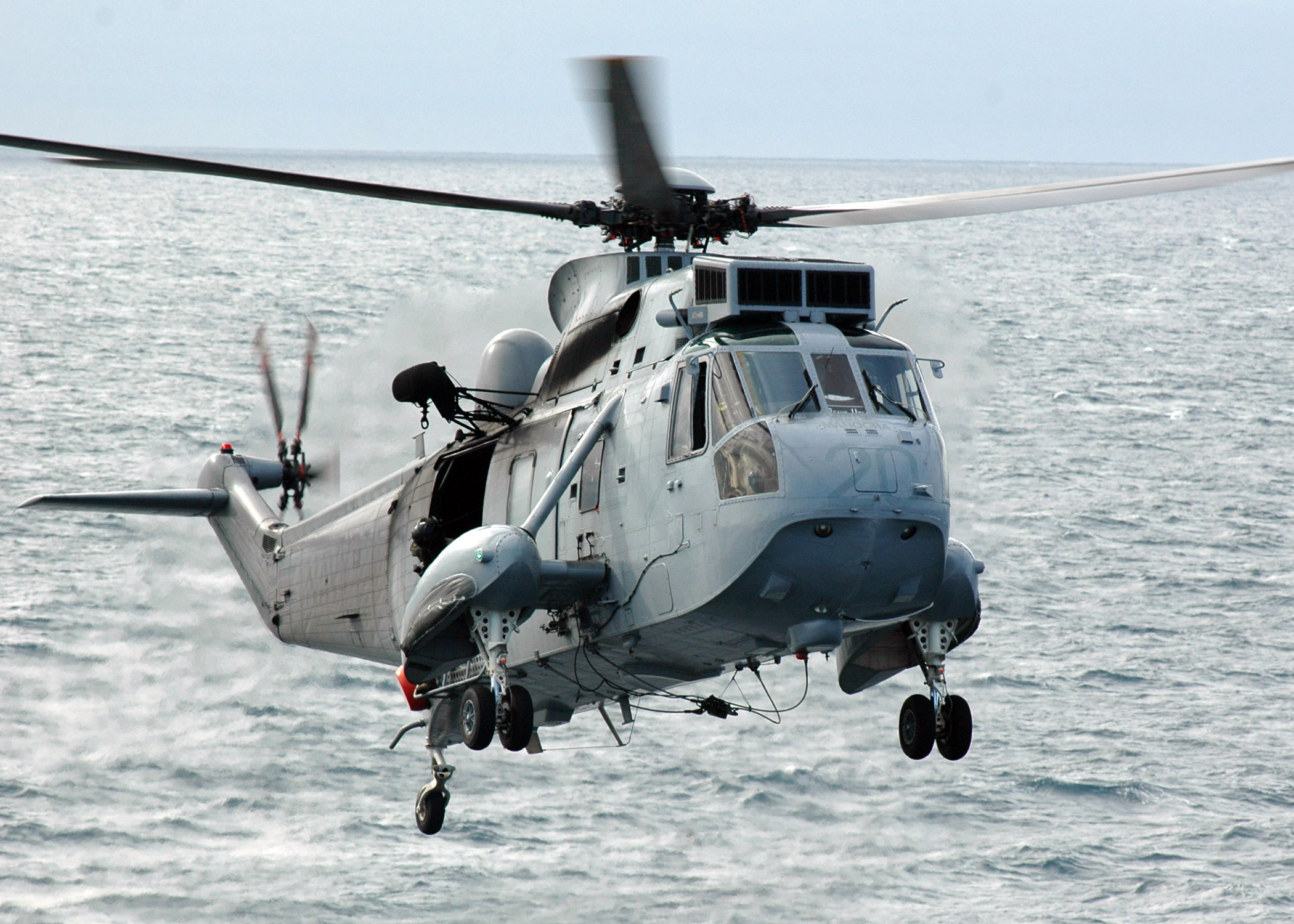
- A Royal Australian Navy Sea King helicopter similar to the one involved in the crash

Accident
- Date: 2 April 2005
- Summary: Mechanical failure due to poor maintenance
- Site: Nias, Indonesia

Aircraft
- Aircraft type: Westland Sea King
- Operator: Royal Australian Navy
- Registration: N16-100
- Destination: Nias, Indonesia
- Passengers: 11
- Crew: 6
- Fatalities: 9
- Injuries: 2
- Survivors: 2

On 2 April 2005, a Royal Australian Navy Westland WS-61 Sea King helicopter (tail number N16-100, call sign "Shark 02") of 817 Squadron RAN crashed while approaching to land on a sports field located near the village of Tuindrao in the region of Amandraya on the Indonesian island of Nias, where it was due to provide humanitarian support to people affected by the 2004 Indian Ocean earthquake and tsunami. The aircraft had 11 personnel on board, of whom two survived the crash.

A Defence Board of Inquiry later found that the primary cause of the accident was a failure of the aircraft's flight control systems. This was as a result of a series of errors, and a general practice of poor maintenance on the aircraft.

== Casualties ==
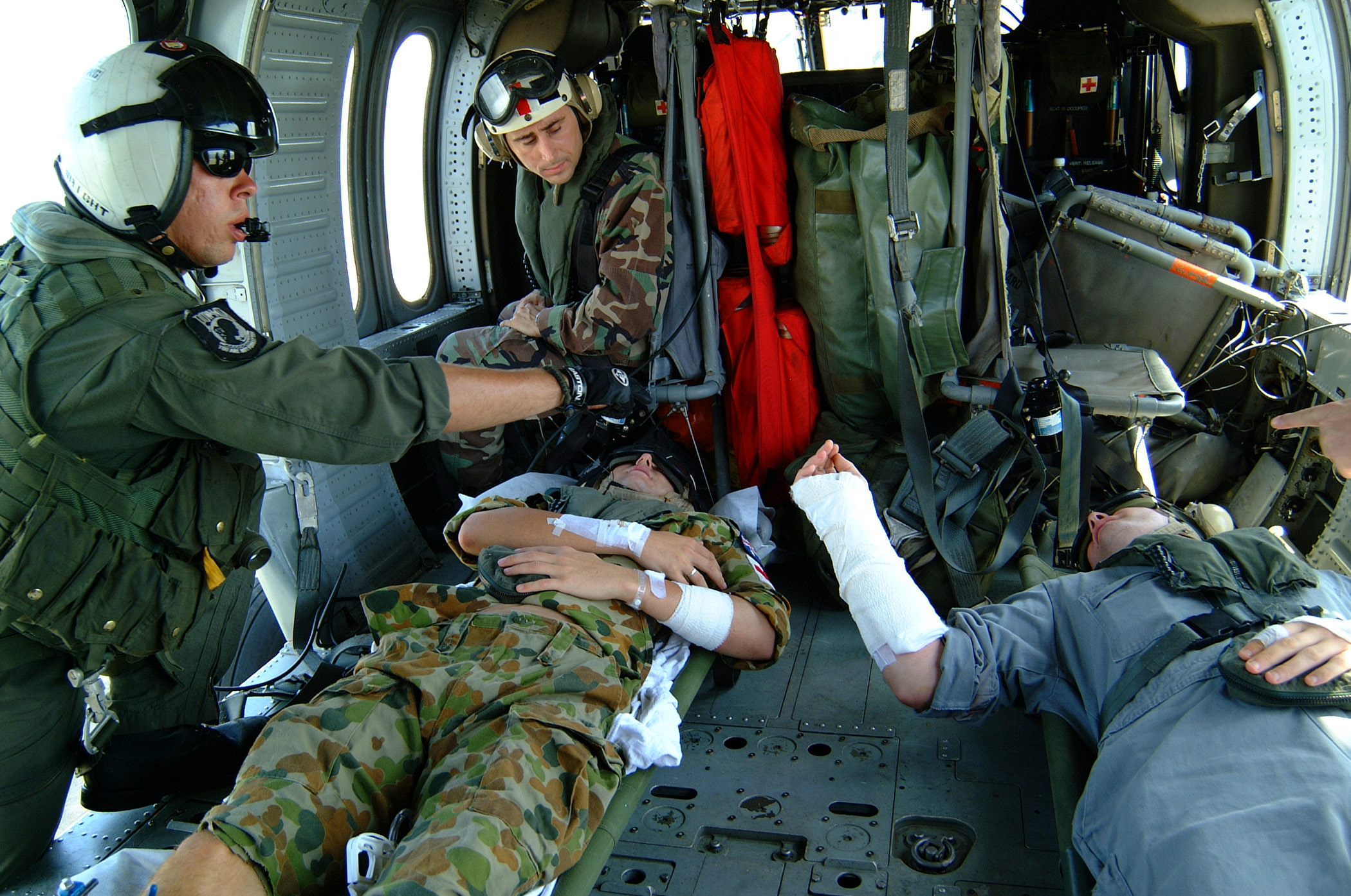
The two crash survivors aboard a United States Navy MH-60S Seahawk, 5 April 2005

Nine personnel died in the accident, including six navy officers and three members of the Royal Australian Air Force.

Two personnel survived the crash: Navy Leading Seaman Shane Warburton, and Air Force Corporal Scott Nichols.

== Ceremonies and National Service of Thanksgiving ==
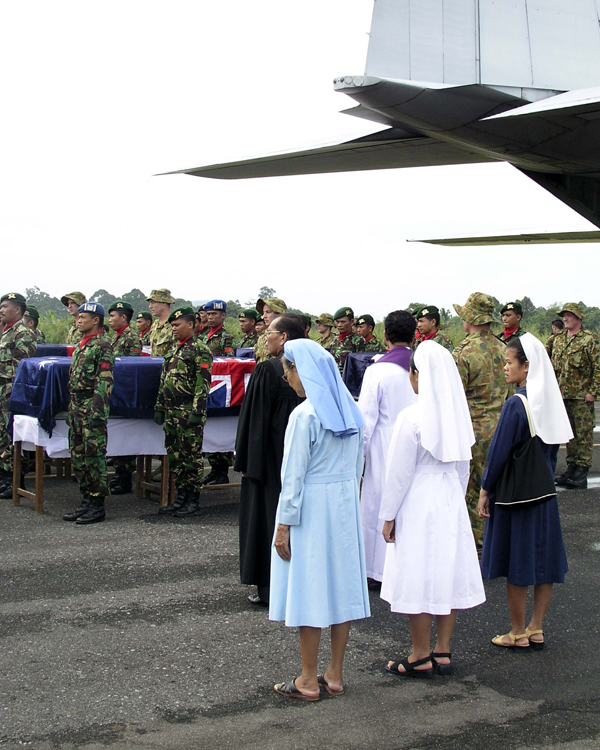
Many Nias locals, including Catholic religious, joined with Indonesian and Australian troops to honour the deceased in a ceremony held as their remains were loaded into an RAAF Hercules aircraft

The arrival of the bodies in Australia on 5 April 2005 was marked by a ceremony at Sydney Airport. Families of the deceased were joined by the Governor-General of Australia, Major General Michael Jeffery, the President of Indonesia, Susilo Bambang Yudhoyono, Australian Prime Minister, John Howard, Chief of Defence Force, General Peter Cosgrove and the Chiefs of the Army, Navy and the Air Force.

Each of the deceased was honoured with a Service funeral. A National Service of Thanksgiving for those killed in the crash of "Shark 02" was held on Friday, 15 April 2005 in the Great Hall of Australian Parliament House in Canberra. The service was attended by family members, friends and colleagues of all nine members killed, and by both survivors. The service was led by the Anglican Bishop to the Australian Defence Force, Tom Frame. Others who spoke at the service included: John Howard, Australian Prime Minister; Kim Beazley, Leader of the Opposition; and Imron Cotan, Indonesian Ambassador to Australia. Services were also held at the Australian Defence Force's headquarters in Canberra, and at other Service establishments across the country.

== Awards ==
The state visit of President of Indonesia, Susilo Bambang Yudhoyono, allowed him to present the Medal of Valour – his country's highest honour – to each of the deceased, placing a medal on each casket. The two survivors were awarded with the honour at a later time.

The Indonesian award highlighted a problem of awarding similar honours by the Australian Government, as the servicemen and women had been part of a humanitarian operation at the time of the incident, not a military one. This was overcome by changing the circumstances for the award of the Humanitarian Overseas Service Medal, so that all who served in the Indonesian humanitarian mission would be eligible, including the nine deceased and two survivors.

On 17 March 2008, the actions of one of the survivors, former Leading Seaman Warburton, were recognised with Australia's second highest bravery award, the Star of Courage. The Minister for Defence, the Hon. Joel Fitzgibbon MP, said that Shane Warburton's actions in saving a colleague while facing immense personal danger was a significant act of heroism worthy of such recognition. The Minister said his selfless act was particularly noteworthy given he himself was seriously injured in the accident.

On 26 May 2009, four Indonesian men – Benar Giawa, Adiziduhu Harefa, Motani Harefa and Seti Eli Ndruru – were awarded the Bravery Medal at the Australian Embassy in Jakarta, for their role in rescuing the survivors of "Shark 02". Together, they carried the men to safety away from the crash site, made the Australians comfortable and provided first aid.

== Board of Inquiry ==
A Board of Inquiry was appointed by the Maritime Commander Australia on 28 April 2005 to fully investigate the circumstances surrounding the incident. An initial analysis of the accident was conducted by an Aircraft Accident Investigation Team. The board delivered its report with findings and recommendations to the appointing authority on 18 December 2006; this report was made public in June 2007.

An article in The Bulletin in April 2007 revealed allegations of substandard maintenance on Sea King helicopters before and after the accident.

In an interview with Ray Martin, the Maritime Commander Australia, Rear Admiral Davyd Thomas, said he understood the anger of grieving families.

RAY MARTIN: The Navy's integrity is on the line. Is your integrity on the line too?
REAR ADMIRAL DAVYD THOMAS: Absolutely, my integrity is on the line, I know that.

The board found that the crash was survivable and that deficiencies in the seating, restraint systems, and the cabin configuration contributed to the deaths of seven of the occupants who appeared to have survived the initial impact. The primary cause of the accident was found to be a failure in the flight control systems, specifically a separation of the fore/aft bellcrank from the pitch control linkages in the aircraft's mixing unit. The failure in the flight control systems was ultimately found to be caused by systematic errors and deficiencies in the maintenance program employed by 817 Squadron at the time of the accident. The maintenance activity which led to the accident occurred 57 days before the accident.

The board made 256 recommendations, all of which were accepted by the Department. These recommendations were fully implemented by October 2008.

== Memorials ==
- In September 2005, the remains of the deceased ADF personnel were interred in a memorial at Russell Offices in Canberra.
- In June 2006, a plaque in the Lawrence Hargrave Reserve in Potts Point was dedicated to the ADF personnel killed in the crash.
- In December 2009, the City of Perth Surf Life Saving Club named a surf boat in memory of one of the Navy personnel killed in the crash.
- In April 2014, a memorial for the victims located at HMAS Albatross was renovated with the assistance of the families. A ceremony was held to mark the 9th anniversary of the crash.
