= Supply =

Supply or supplies may refer to:

- The amount of a resource that is available
  - Supply (economics), the amount of a product which is available to customers
  - Materiel, the goods and equipment for a military unit to fulfill its mission
- Supply, as in confidence and supply, the provision of funds for government expenditure

== Places ==
- Supply, North Carolina, an unincorporated community
- Supply, Virginia, an unincorporated community

== People with the name ==
- Supply Belcher (1751–1836), early American composer of the First New England School

== Ships ==
- Supply-class fast combat support ship
- Supply-class replenishment oiler
- HMS Supply, eight ships of the Royal Navy of the United Kingdom
- HMAS Supply, two ships of the Royal Australian Navy
- USS Supply, four ships of the United States Navy

== Other uses ==
- "Supplies" (song), by Justin Timberlake, from his 2018 album Man of the Woods

== See also ==
- Fort Supply (disambiguation)
- Supply management (disambiguation)
- Supply ship (disambiguation)
