= HMAS Stalwart (A304) =

Supply-class replenishment oiler for the Royal Australian Navy

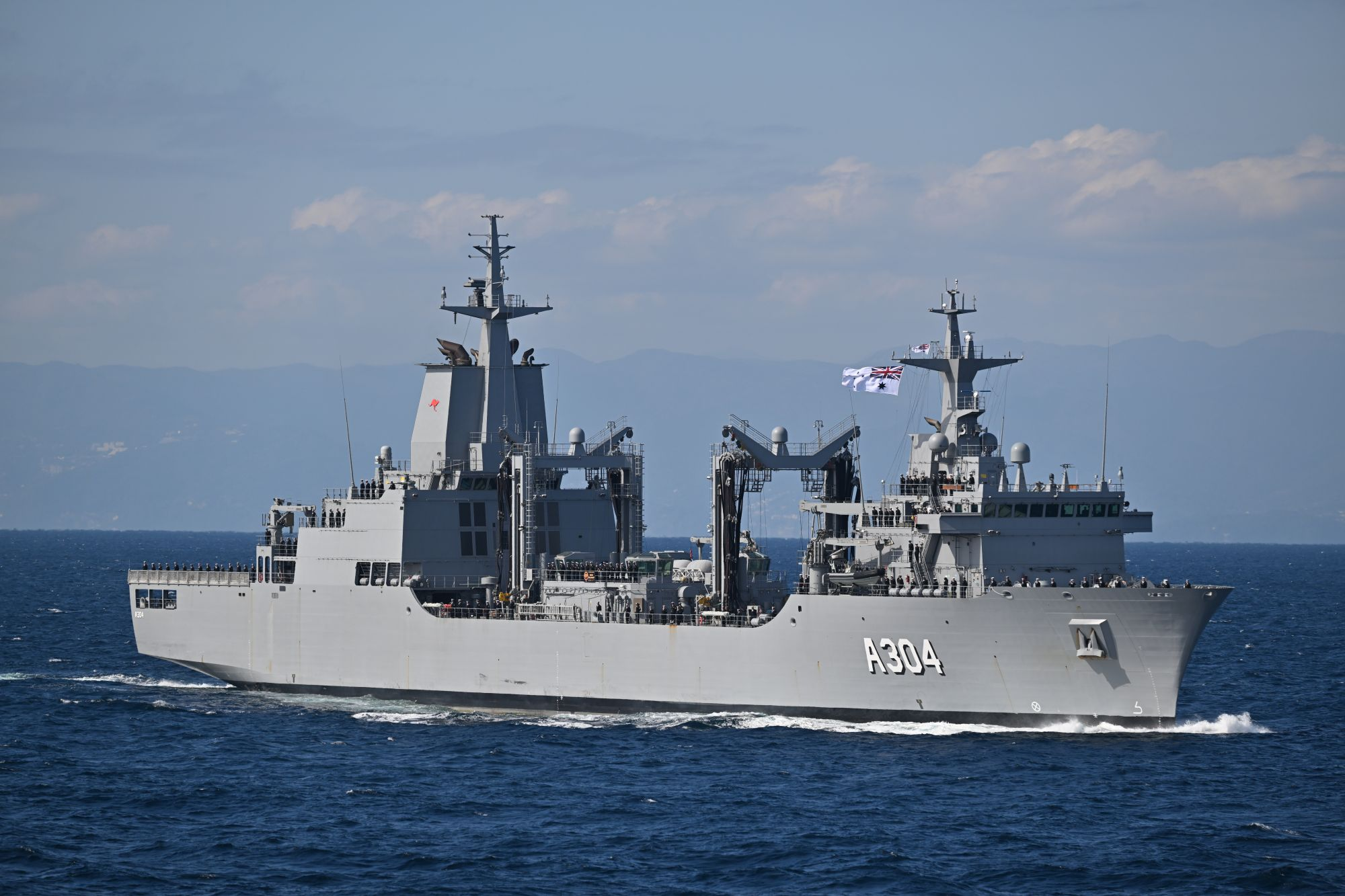
- HMAS Stalwart in 2022

History

Australia
- Ordered: 10 March 2016
- Builder: Navantia
- Laid down: 25 November 2018
- Launched: 30 August 2019
- Commissioned: 13 November 2021
- Home port: HMAS Stirling
- Identification: IMO number: 9816933; MMSI number: 503171000; Callsign: VKCU
- Motto: Heart of Oak
- Status: Active
- Badge

General characteristics
- Class & type: Supply-class replenishment oiler
- Displacement: 19,500 tonnes (19,200 long tons; 21,500 short tons) full load
- Length: 173.9 m (570 ft 6 in)
- Beam: 23 m (75 ft 6 in) maximum
- Draught: 8 m (26 ft 3 in)
- Propulsion: 2 x MAN 18V 32/40 main engines; 4 x MAN 7L21/31 generator sets
- Speed: 20 knots (37 km/h; 23 mph)
- Range: 6,000 nautical miles (11,000 km; 6,900 mi) at 13 knots (24 km/h; 15 mph)
- Complement: 122
- Aircraft carried: 1xMH-60R

HMAS Stalwart is the second of the Navantia built Supply-class replenishment oiler for the Royal Australian Navy. It had its keel laid in November 2018 as a part of the SEA 1654 Phase 3 project. HMAS Stalwart (III) and her sister ship HMAS Supply (II) replace HMAS Success and HMAS Sirius with a single class of two auxiliary oiler replenisher (AOR) ships to sustain deployed maritime forces.

The two ships are based on the Spanish Cantabria class and were built at the Ferrol shipyard. As of March 2021, the vessel began sea trials in Spain though work on her was running about eight months behind schedule. She arrived in Australia in June 2021 for her final fit out with Australian-specific equipment. Stalwart was commissioned on 13 November 2021 at Fleet Base West. In June 2024 Stalwart was brought into Darwin for emergency repairs due to engine trouble. The ship resumed operations in late 2025 after repairs were completed.
