= Supply ship =

Supply ship may refer to:

- Cargo spacecraft
- Platform supply vessel, to supply offshore oil platforms
- A type of auxiliary ship
- Combat stores ship
- Depot ship
- Replenishment oiler
- Ship's tender

== See also ==
- HMS Supply
- HMAS Supply
- USS Supply
- Supply-class replenishment oiler
- Supply-class fast combat support ship
- Supply (disambiguation)
- Ship (disambiguation)
