= HMAS Supply =

Two ships of the Royal Australian Navy (RAN) have been named HMAS Supply. Named for HMAT Supply armed tender that was part of First Fleet.

- HMAS Supply (AO 195), a Tide-class replenishment oiler launched on 1 September 1954 into the Royal Fleet Auxiliary and commissioned on 15 August 1962 into the Royal Australian Navy, decommissioned on 16 December 1985.
- HMAS Supply (A195), a replenishment oiler is the lead ship in the new Supply-class AOR based on the Cantabria-class oiler. The keel was laid down by Navantia on 17 November 2017, and Supply launched on 23 November 2018 and commissioned on 10 April 2021.

== See also ==
- HMS Supply, seven ships of the Royal Navy
