= Supplier =

Supplier may refer to:

- Manufacturer, uses tools and labour to make things for sale
- Processor (manufacturing), converts a product from one form to another
- Packager (manufacturing), encloses products for distribution, storage, sale, and use
- Distributor (marketing), the intermediary between the manufacturer and retailer
- Wholesaler, sells goods or merchandise to retailers
- Franchised dealership, local franchised distribution
  - Drug dealer, supplies illegal drugs
- Merchant, a professional dealing with trade
- Vendor, a supplier of goods or services

== See also ==
- Supply chain
- Supply network
- Supply chain network
- Supply (disambiguation)
