= R. Peralta =

R. Peralta may refer to:

- Rafael Peralta, a United States Marine.
- Richard "Chad" Peralta, a Filipino-Australian actor and singer.
