= USS Supply (IX-147) =

Cargo ship of the United States Navy

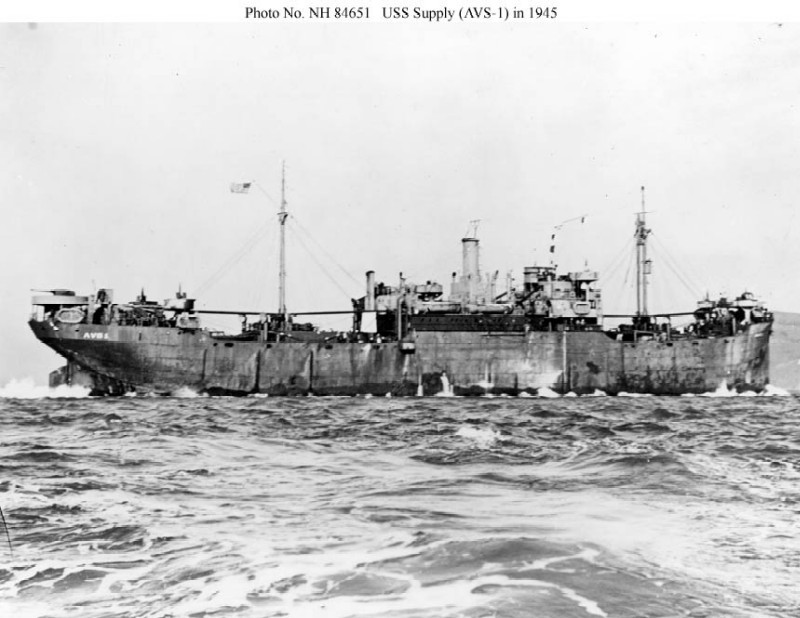
- USS Supply (AVS-1), underway, date and location unknown

History

United States
- Name: Ward (1921-1940); Exton (1940-1942)
- Owner: United States Shipping Board (USSB)
- Operator: American Pioneer Line (1921-1940); American Export Line (1940-1942)
- Ordered: as USSB Design 1037 ship freighter
- Builder: Doullet & Williams, New Orleans, Louisiana
- Yard number: 1913
- Laid down: 1921
- In service: May 1921
- Out of service: 1942
- Identification: O.N. 221111
- Fate: Transferred to United States Maritime Commission (MARCOM), 1942

United States
- Name: Ward
- Operator: War Shipping Administration (WSA)
- In service: 1942
- Out of service: 5 February 1944
- Fate: Transferred to US Navy, 5 February 1944

United States
- Name: Supply
- Acquired: 5 February 1944
- Commissioned: 8 February 1944
- Decommissioned: 4 February 1946
- Reclassified: Aviation Stores Issue (AVS), 25 May 1945
- Identification: Hull symbol: IX-147; Hull symbol: AVS-1; Callsign: NJSD
- Fate: Sold for scrapping, 26 January 1947

General characteristics
- Class & type: Design 1037 ship
- Tonnage: 6,171 GT
- Displacement: 13,250 long tons (13,460 t)
- Length: 411 ft 9 in (125.50 m)
- Beam: 55 ft (17 m)
- Draft: 27 ft 2 in (8.28 m)
- Installed power: 3 × Scotch boilers; 1 × Busch-Sulzer Single-acting diesel (converted, 11 June 1929); 3,500 shp (2,600 kW) (steam); 3,950 bhp (2,950 kW) (diesel)
- Propulsion: 1 × George A. Fuller Company triple-expansion steam engine; 2 × 340 kW (460 hp) turbo-electric drives (converted to diesel 11 June 1929); 1 × 35 kW (47 hp) turbo-electric drive; 1 × screw
- Speed: 11.8 kn (21.9 km/h; 13.6 mph)
- Complement: 15 officers; 152 enlisted
- Armament: 4 in (100 mm)/50 caliber gun; 3 in (76 mm)/50 caliber gun; 8 × 20 mm (0.79 in) Oerlikon cannons

The third USS Supply (IX-147/AVS-1) was a US Navy aviation stores issue ship of World War II. Originally built as Ward, a United States Shipping Board (USSB), Design 1037 freighter, she acquired by the Navy 5 February 1944, and commissioned 8 February 1944, as Supply (IX-147). She was reclassified AVS-1, on 25 May 1945.

== Construction ==
Ward was laid down in 1921, by Doullet & Williams, in New Orleans, Louisiana, United States Shipping Board (USSB) hull #1913. She was delivered in May, to the USSB.

== Civilian history ==
Ward was operated by the American Pioneer Lines, from 1921 to 1940. She typically ran between New York and Australian ports. In 1929, her boilers were replace with diesel engines. In 1940, she was operated by the American Export Lines, and renamed Exton. In 1942, she was acquired by the United States Maritime Commission (MARCOM), and her name was reverted to Ward.

== Service history ==
On 22 September 1943, Admiral Chester Nimitz (CinCPac), approved the request by Vice Admiral John Henry Towers (ComAirPac), for the acquisition of five "General Stores Issues Ships" for use in the Central and South Pacific theaters. The Auxiliary Vessels Board noted that there were two cargo ships in New York, that would be acceptable, MS City of Elwood and MS Ward, though they were described as being little more than hulks and in very poor material condition with unreliable engines".

It was recommended that they be converted before sailing for the Pacific, by having shelves, cribbing, and bins, installed for the storage of aviation supplies, along with a makeshift aircraft engine de-preservation room, and facilities for the crating both of engines and of other aviation equipment.

Ward sailed from Hoboken, New Jersey, to Pearl Harbor, Territory of Hawaii, on 25 November 1943, after calling at Norfolk, Virginia, and Oakland, California, to load aviation material. Upon her arrival at Pearl Harbor, the ship was to be allocated to the Navy, on a bare-boat basis, by the War Shipping Administration (WSA).

The ship entered the Pearl Harbor Navy Yard for repairs, alterations, and conversion, into an auxiliary aviation supply ship. Ward would be expected to store and direct issue aviation supplies in forward areas. While she was expected to remain stationary most of the time, she would also be expected to move under her own power to other bases. Because she was expected to have long periods of immobility, her naval crew would be kept to a minimum.

Ward was acquired by the Navy, at Pearl Harbor, on 5 February 1944, and commissioned on 8 February 1944, as Supply (IX-147).

Supply departed Pearl Harbor, on 25 March, for Majuro, Marshall Islands, to replenish aircraft carriers for further strikes west of those islands. After the fleet sailed, Supply steamed to Roi-Namur, on 22 April, and operated as a floating aviation supply depot there until early July.

Supply sailed for Pearl Harbor, on 7 July, where she underwent extensive alterations to enable her to double the amount of stores that could be kept in a ready-for-issue status. The ship sailed for Yap, Caroline Islands, to assist in setting up an aviation supply depot there. Pending the military operation against the island, the supply ship was routed to Peleliu, via Funafuti, Tulagi, and Manus, arriving on 14 October, the day the island was declared secure. As she could not anchor there, Supply moved up to Kossol Passage. The ship remained there for a month supplying Marine Air Group 11 (MAG 11) with aircraft stores. On 15 November, she steamed to the fleet anchorage at Ulithi, where she assisted PBM tenders and MAG 45 for several weeks. At this time it was decided that Yap was to be bypassed, and the ship's destination was changed to Guam.

Supply arrived at Guam, on 7 December 1944, and by 7 February 1945, had stripped herself of all supplies. She returned to Roi, to replenish, and then sailed for Saipan, on 3 March. Her next mission was to assist in establishing an aviation supply depot at Okinawa. However, due to the kamikaze attacks on the fleet there, it was decided to retain the ship in the Mariana Islands until the island was secured. On 25 May, Supply was redesignated from "Unclassified Miscellaneous" IX-147 to "Aviation Supply Issues Ship" AVS-1.

Supply finally sailed for Okinawa, on 8 July, and arrived there a week later. She first discharged her top-loaded cargo to seaplane tenders and then began transferring bulk stores to the beaches. The ship was at Okinawa when hostilities with Japan ceased. She remained there until 3 November, when she weighed anchor en route to the United States, via Pearl Harbor.

== Fate ==
Supply arrived at San Diego, and unloaded her cargo at Naval Base San Diego, before proceeding to San Francisco, for inactivation. The ship arrived at San Francisco, on 19 December 1945. On 4 February 1946, Supply was returned to the WSA and decommissioned, and placed in the Suisun Bay Reserve Fleet, in Suisun Bay, California. She was struck from the Navy List on 25 February 1946. Supply was sold by MARCOM on 26 January 1947, to the Florida Pipe and Supply Company.

== Awards ==
Supply received one battle star for World War II service.

== Bibliography ==
- Priolo, Gary P. (16 August 2013). "USS Supply (AVS-1)". NavSource.
- Colton, Tim (24 August 2021). "DOULLUT & WILLIAMS, New Orleans LA". www.ShipbuildingHistory.com.
- Roberts, Stephen S. (24 August 2008). "AVS01".
- McKellar, N.L. (1963). "Steel Shipbuilding Under the U.S. Shipping Board, 1917-1921" (PDF).
- Maritime Administration. "SUPPLY (IX-147/AVS-1)". Ship History Database Vessel Status Card. U.S. Department of Transportation, Maritime Administration.
- Cressman, Robert J. (11 March 2024). "Supply III (IX-147)". Dictionary of American Naval Fighting Ships. Navy Department, Naval History and Heritage Command. This article incorporates text from this source, which is in the public domain.
