= USS Fortune (IX-146) =

Cargo ship of the United States Navy

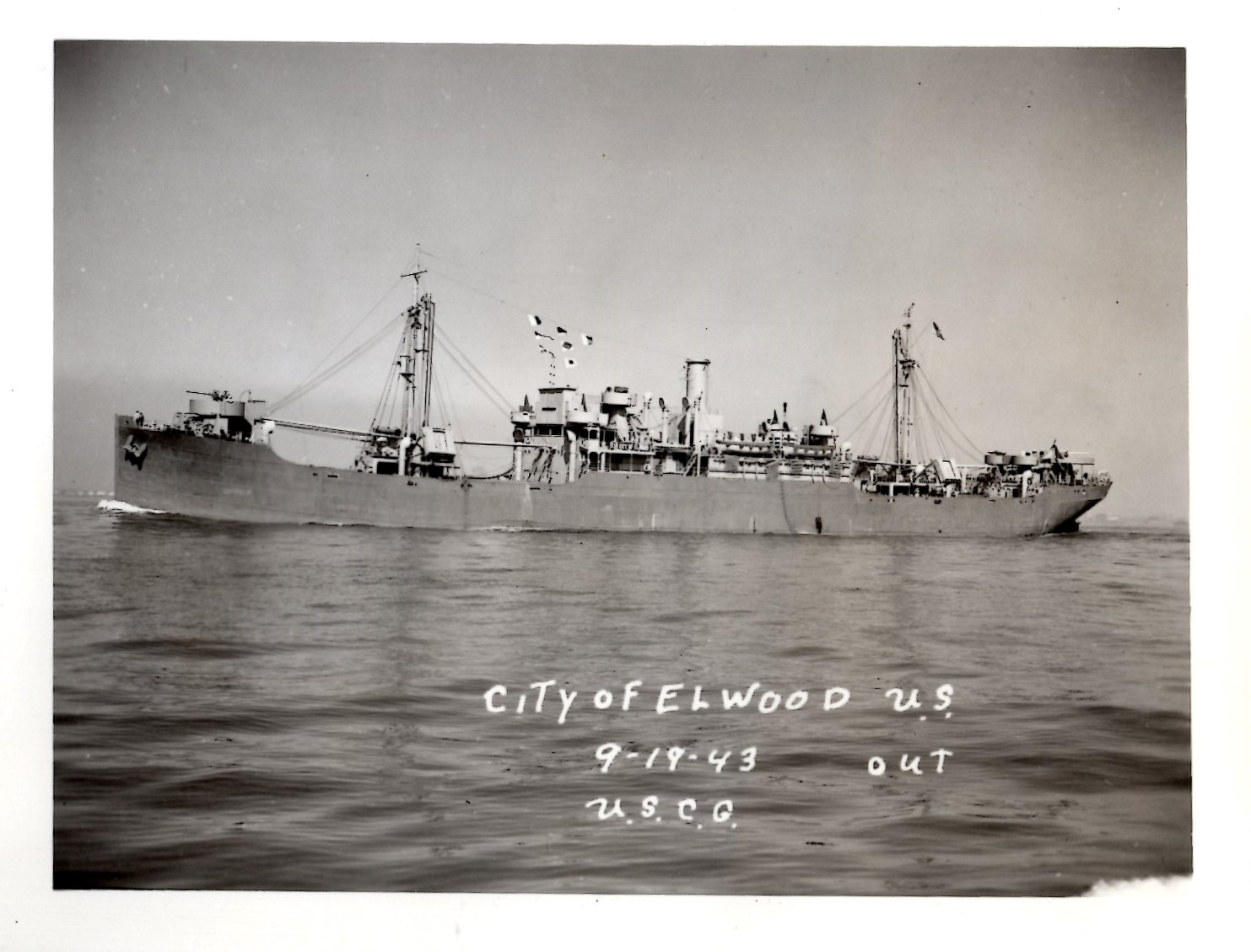
- City Of Elwood on 18 September 1943, at New York, United States Coast Guard photo

History

United States
- Name: City of Elwood
- Owner: United States Shipping Board (USSB)
- Operator: American Pioneer Line
- Ordered: as USSB Design 1037 ship freighter
- Builder: Doullet & Williams, New Orleans, Louisiana
- Yard number: 1910
- Laid down: 1921
- Launched: 18 March 1921
- In service: April 1921
- Out of service: 4 December 1941
- Identification: O.N. 220962
- Fate: Transferred to United States Lines, 5 December 1941

United States
- Name: City of Elwood
- Owner: United States Lines
- In service: 5 December 1941
- Out of service: 16 February 1944
- Fate: Transferred to US Navy, 16 February 1944
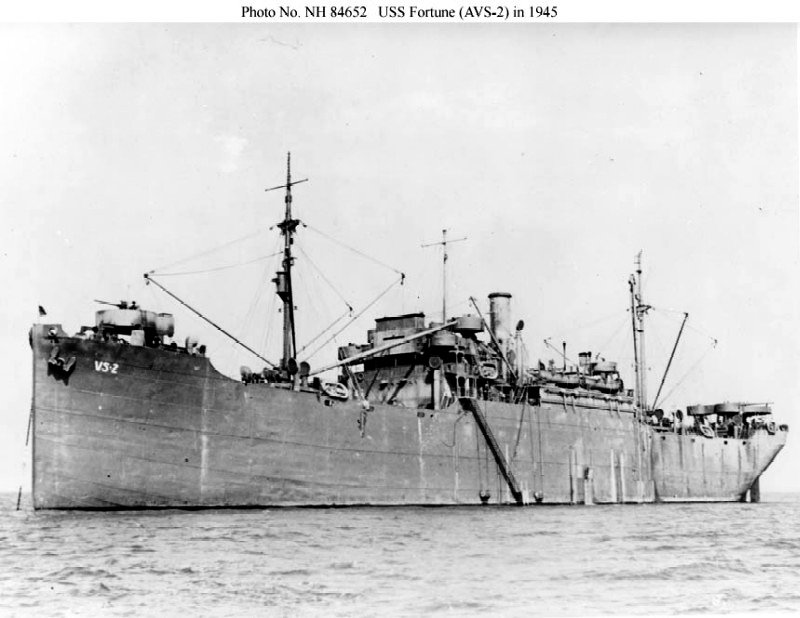
- USS Fortune (AVS-2), at anchor, photographed after the ship was reclassified as "AVS-2", in May 1945

United States
- Name: Fortune
- Acquired: 16 February 1944
- Commissioned: 19 February 1944
- Decommissioned: 18 October 1945
- Reclassified: Aviation Stores Issue (AVS), 25 May 1945
- Identification: Hull symbol: IX-146; Hull symbol: AVS-2; Callsign: NJTS
- Fate: Sold for scrapping, 3 August 1946

General characteristics
- Class & type: Design 1037 ship
- Tonnage: 6,171 GT
- Displacement: 13,250 long tons (13,460 t)
- Length: 411 ft 9 in (125.50 m)
- Beam: 55 ft (17 m)
- Draft: 27 ft 2 in (8.28 m)
- Installed power: 3 × Scotch boilers; 1 × Busch-Sulzer Single-acting diesel (converted, 11 June 1929); 3,500 shp (2,600 kW) (steam); 3,950 bhp (2,950 kW) (diesel)
- Propulsion: 1 × George A. Fuller Company triple-expansion steam engine; 2 × 340 kW (460 hp) turbo-electric drives (converted to diesel 11 June 1929); 1 × 35 kW (47 hp) turbo-electric drive; 1 × screw
- Speed: 11.8 kn (21.9 km/h; 13.6 mph)
- Complement: 13 officers; 150 enlisted
- Armament: 4 in (100 mm)/50 caliber gun; 3 in (76 mm)/50 caliber gun

USS Fortune (IX-146/AVS-2) was a US Navy aviation stores issue ship of World War II. Originally built as City of Elwood, a United States Shipping Board (USSB), Design 1037 freighter, she acquired by the Navy 16 February 1944, and commissioned 19 February 1944. She was reclassified AVS-2, on 25 May 1945.

== Construction ==
City of Elwood was laid down in 1921, by Doullet & Williams, in New Orleans, Louisiana, United States Shipping Board (USSB) hull #1910. She was launched on 18 March 1921, and delivered in April, to the USSB.

== Civilian history ==
City of Elwood was owned by the USSB between the wars and allocated to the American Pioneer Line for service between New York and Baltimore and Oriental ports. In 1929, her boilers were replace with diesel engines. On 5 December 1941, she was transferred to the United States Maritime Commission and operated by the United States Lines.

== Service history ==
Commissioned at Pearl Harbor, Fortune (IX-146) sailed 16 May 1944, for Kwajalein, her base for cargo operations to Eniwetok, Manus, and Ulithi, until 10 January 1945, when she became "aviation supply issue ship" "AVS-2", at Ulithi. She sailed from Ulithi 24 April, with passengers for Alameda, California, arriving 20 May, and lay in various California shipyards until decommissioned 18 October 1945, and transferred to the War Shipping Administration the same day.

== Fate ==
Fortune was laid up in the Suisun Bay Reserve Fleet, in Suisun Bay, on 18 October 1945. She was sold for $5,954, to the American Iron and Steel Company, for scrapping on 30 August 1946.

== Bibliography ==
- Priolo, Gary P. (5 April 2019). "USS Fortune (AVS-2)". NavSource.
- Colton, Tim (24 August 2021). "DOULLUT & WILLIAMS, New Orleans LA". www.ShipbuildingHistory.com.
- McKellar, N.L. (1963). "Steel Shipbuilding Under the U.S. Shipping Board, 1917-1921" (PDF).
- Maritime Administration. "City of Elwood". Ship History Database Vessel Status Card. U.S. Department of Transportation, Maritime Administration.
- "Fortune II (IX-146)". Dictionary of American Naval Fighting Ships. Navy Department, Naval History and Heritage Command. 9 July 2015. This article incorporates text from this source, which is in the public domain.
