= Fort Supply =

Fort Supply may refer to:

- Fort Supply (Oklahoma), USA; a former US military post (1868–1895)
- Fort Supply, Oklahoma, USA; a town in Woodward County
- Fort Supply Lake, a lake in Woodward County, Oklahoma, USA
- Fort Supply (Utah Territory), USA; a former Mormon settlement (1853–1857) in modern-day Wyoming

== See also ==
- Supply fort, a supply depot
- Supply (disambiguation)
- Fort (disambiguation)
