= USS Rafael Peralta =

Arleigh Burke-class destroyer

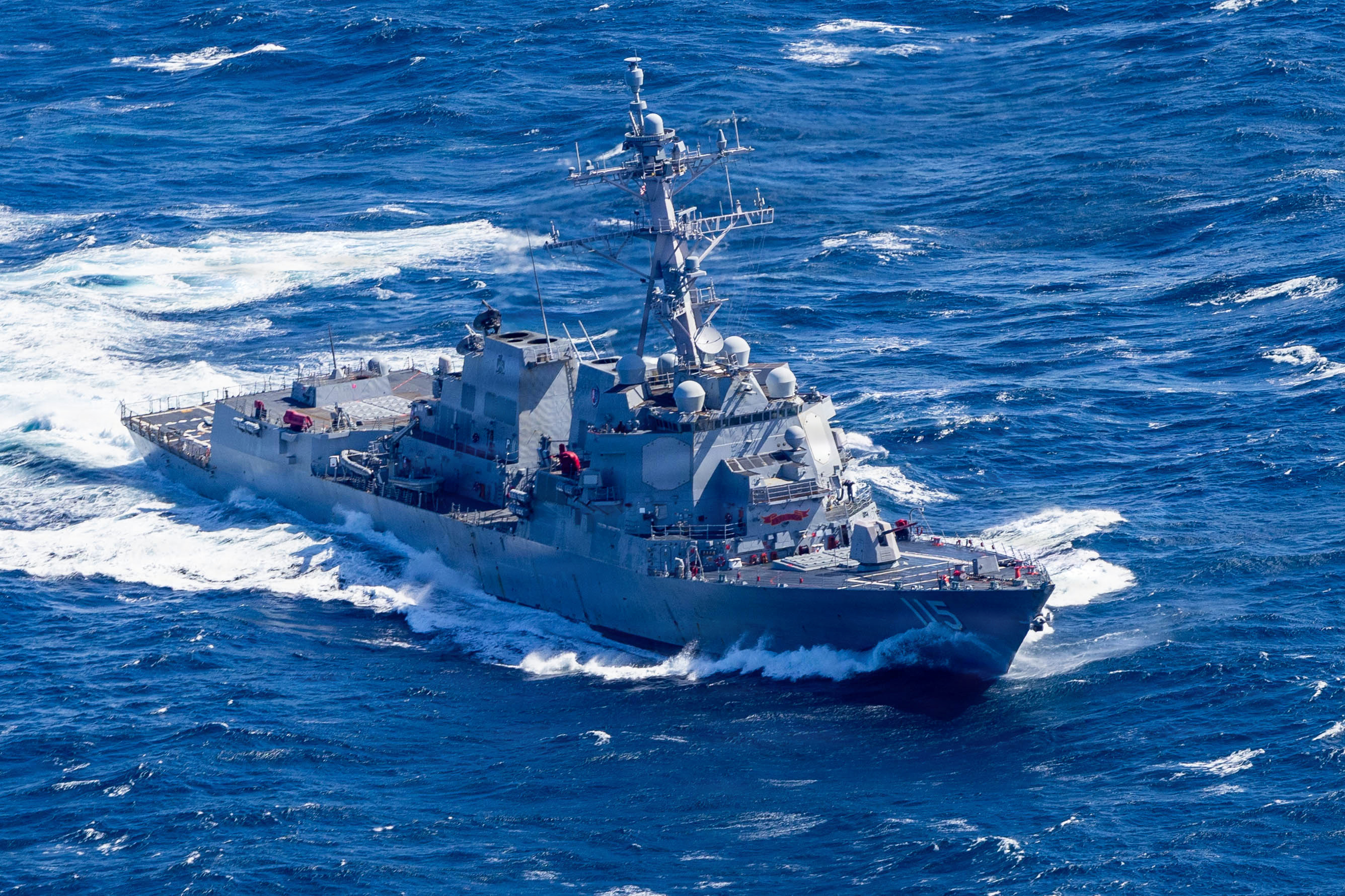
- USS Rafael Peralta in March 2026

History

United States
- Name: Rafael Peralta
- Namesake: Rafael Peralta
- Ordered: 26 September 2011
- Builder: Bath Iron Works
- Laid down: 30 October 2014
- Launched: 31 October 2015
- Sponsored by: Rosa Maria Peralta
- Christened: 31 October 2015
- Acquired: 3 February 2017
- Commissioned: 29 July 2017
- Home port: Yokosuka
- Identification: MMSI number: 368926053; Hull number: DDG-115
- Motto: Fortis ad Finem; (Courageous to the End)
- Status: in active service
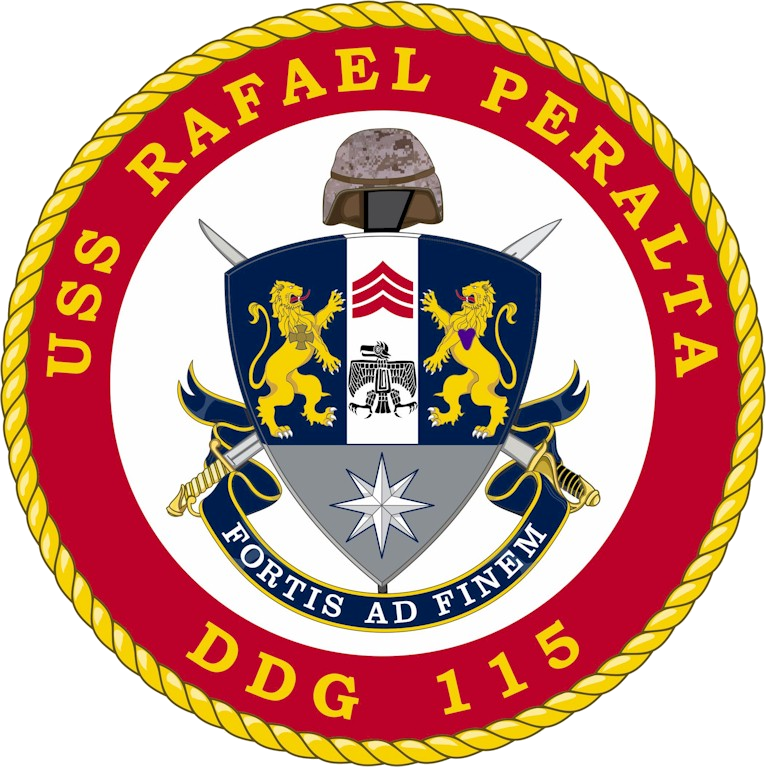
- Badge

General characteristics
- Class & type: Arleigh Burke-class destroyer
- Displacement: 9,217 tons (full load)
- Length: 513 feet (156 m)
- Beam: 66 feet (20 m)
- Propulsion: 4 × General Electric LM2500 gas turbines 100,000 shp (75,000 kW)
- Speed: 30 kn (56 km/h; 35 mph)
- Complement: 380 officers and enlisted
- Armament: Guns: 1 × 5-inch (127 mm)/62 Mk 45 Mod 4 (lightweight gun); 1 × 20 mm (0.8 in) Phalanx CIWS; 2 × 25 mm (0.98 in) Mk 38 machine gun system; 4 × 0.50 in (12.7 mm) caliber guns; Missiles: 1 × 32-cell, 1 × 64-cell (96 total cells) Mk 41 vertical launching system (VLS): RIM-66M surface-to-air missile; RIM-156 surface-to-air missile; RIM-174A Standard ERAM; RIM-161 anti-ballistic missile; RIM-162 ESSM (quad-packed); BGM-109 Tomahawk cruise missile; RUM-139 vertical launch ASROC; Torpedoes: 2 × Mark 32 triple torpedo tubes: Mark 46 lightweight torpedo; Mark 50 lightweight torpedo; Mark 54 lightweight torpedo
- Aircraft carried: 2 × MH-60R Seahawk helicopters
- Aviation facilities: Double hangar and helipad

USS Rafael Peralta (DDG-115) is an Arleigh Burke-class (Flight IIA Restart) Aegis guided-missile destroyer in the United States Navy. The destroyer can operate with a Carrier Strike Group, Expeditionary Strike Group, as an element of a Surface Action Group, or independently. The ship can conduct a variety of missions in support of national military strategy. From peacetime presence and crisis management to sea control and power projection, DDG-115 will be capable of carrying out integrated air and missile defense, and undersea, surface, and strike warfare in multithreat environments.

The $679.6 million contract to build her was awarded on 26 September 2011 to Bath Iron Works of Bath, Maine. On 15 February 2012, Secretary of the Navy Ray Mabus announced the ship's named to be Rafael Peralta in honor of U.S. Marine Rafael Peralta, who was petitioned for the Medal of Honor for shielding several marines from a grenade in November 2004 during the Iraq War; however, he was posthumously awarded the Navy Cross, instead.

== Namesake ==
Rafael Peralta was born in Mexico City and immigrated to the United States as a child. He joined the United States Marine Corps when he received his green card in 2000 and became a U.S. citizen while serving in the Marine Corps. Peralta was killed during the Second Battle of Fallujah in Iraq, when he was wounded by small-arms fire while clearing houses with his fellow marines. The insurgents threw a hand grenade into the room. Despite being injured, Peralta pulled the grenade underneath his body (thus absorbing most of the blast), killing him instantly and saving his fellow marines. For his actions, Peralta was recommended for the Medal of Honor, but was posthumously awarded the Navy Cross, instead.

== Design ==
Rafael Peralta is the 65th ship of the Arleigh Burke class of destroyers, the first of which, USS Arleigh Burke, was commissioned in July 1991. With 75 ships planned to be built in total, the class has the longest production run for any U.S. Navy surface combatant warship. As an Arleigh Burke-class ship, Rafael Peralta's roles will include antiaircraft, antisubmarine, and antisurface warfare, as well as strike operations. During its long production run, the class was built in three flights—Flight I (DDG-51 to DDG-76), Flight II (DDG-72 to DDG-78), and Flight IIA (DDG-79 onward). Rafael Peralta is a Flight IIA ship, and as such, features several improvements in terms of ballistic-missile defense, an embarked air wing, and the inclusion of mine-detecting ability.

== Construction and career ==
By January 2014, the aft portion of the ship had been completed and had begun outfitting, and she was laid down on 30 October 2014.

The ship was christened on 31 October 2015 at Bath Iron Works by Rosa Maria Peralta, Sgt. Peralta's mother. In February 2017, the ship was accepted by the U.S. Navy.

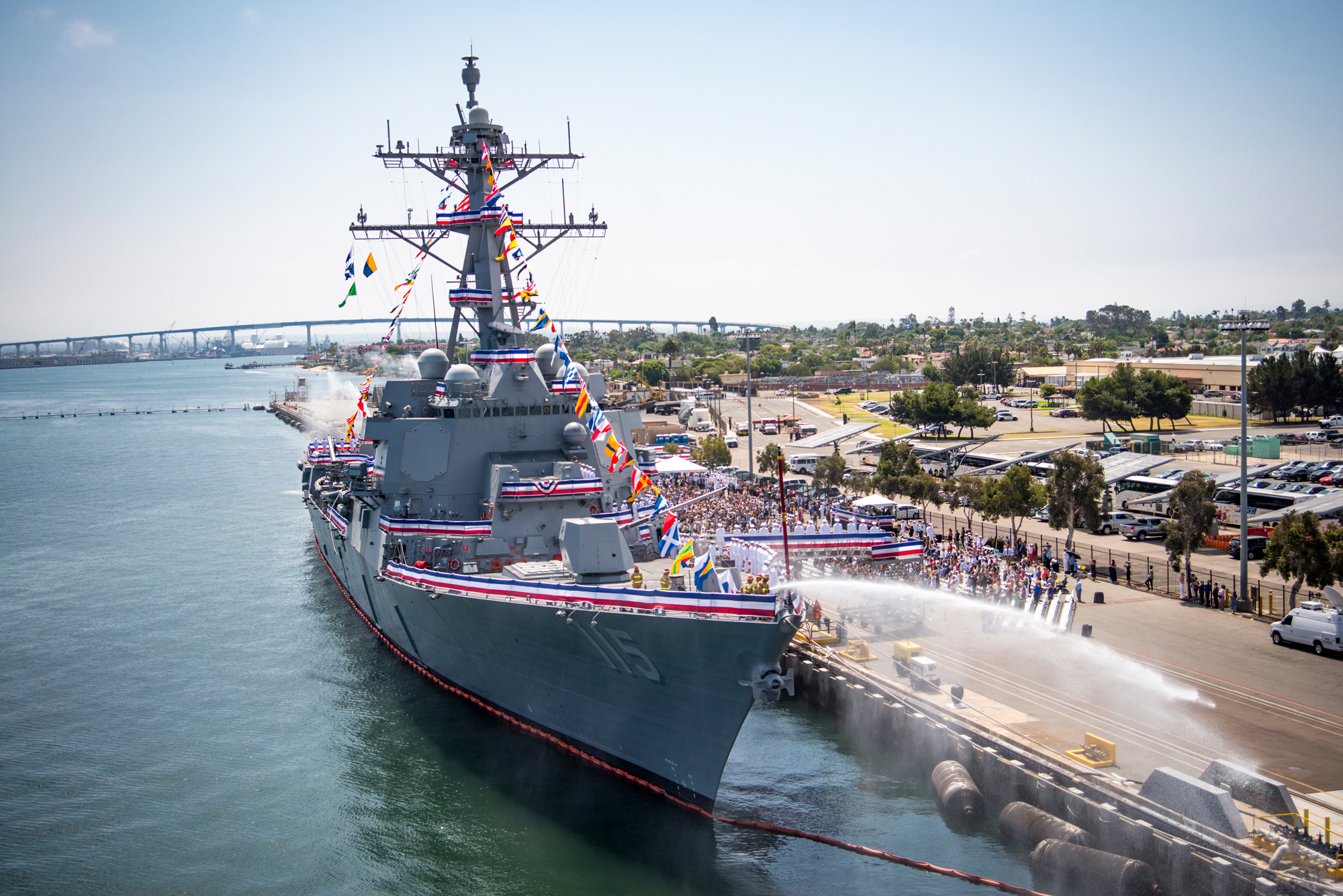
Commissioning of Rafael Peralta on 29 July 2017

Rafael Peralta was commissioned at Naval Air Station North Island in San Diego, California, on 29 July 2017 and was homeported at Naval Base San Diego before moving to Japan in 2021.

The Arleigh Burke-class guided-missile destroyers Rafael Peralta and USS Russell arrived in Sasebo for a port visit on 8 February 2020.

Rafael Peralta joined HMAS Stuart, HMAS Sirius, KDB Darulehsan and RSS Supreme on their way to Pearl Harbor, Hawaii, in preparation for RIMPAC 2020 on 6 August 2020.

During Operation Epic Fury, Rafael Peralta had been deployed as part of the 2026 United States naval blockade of Iran and had been used to turn ships entering or exiting the Iranian ports to turn around or return to port.

=== Deployments ===
- 17 January 2020 - 3 September 2020 - 5th/7th fleet - maiden deployment

== Awards ==
- PACFLT Anti-Submarine Warfare Bloodhound Award - 2024
- Presidential Unit Citation - Operation Epic Fury, 2026

== In popular culture ==
Rafael Peralta was used in the Amazon Prime Video series Tom Clancy's Jack Ryan, season two, episode eight, in November 2019.
