= HMAS Sirius =

Former fleet replenishment vessel of Royal Australian Navy

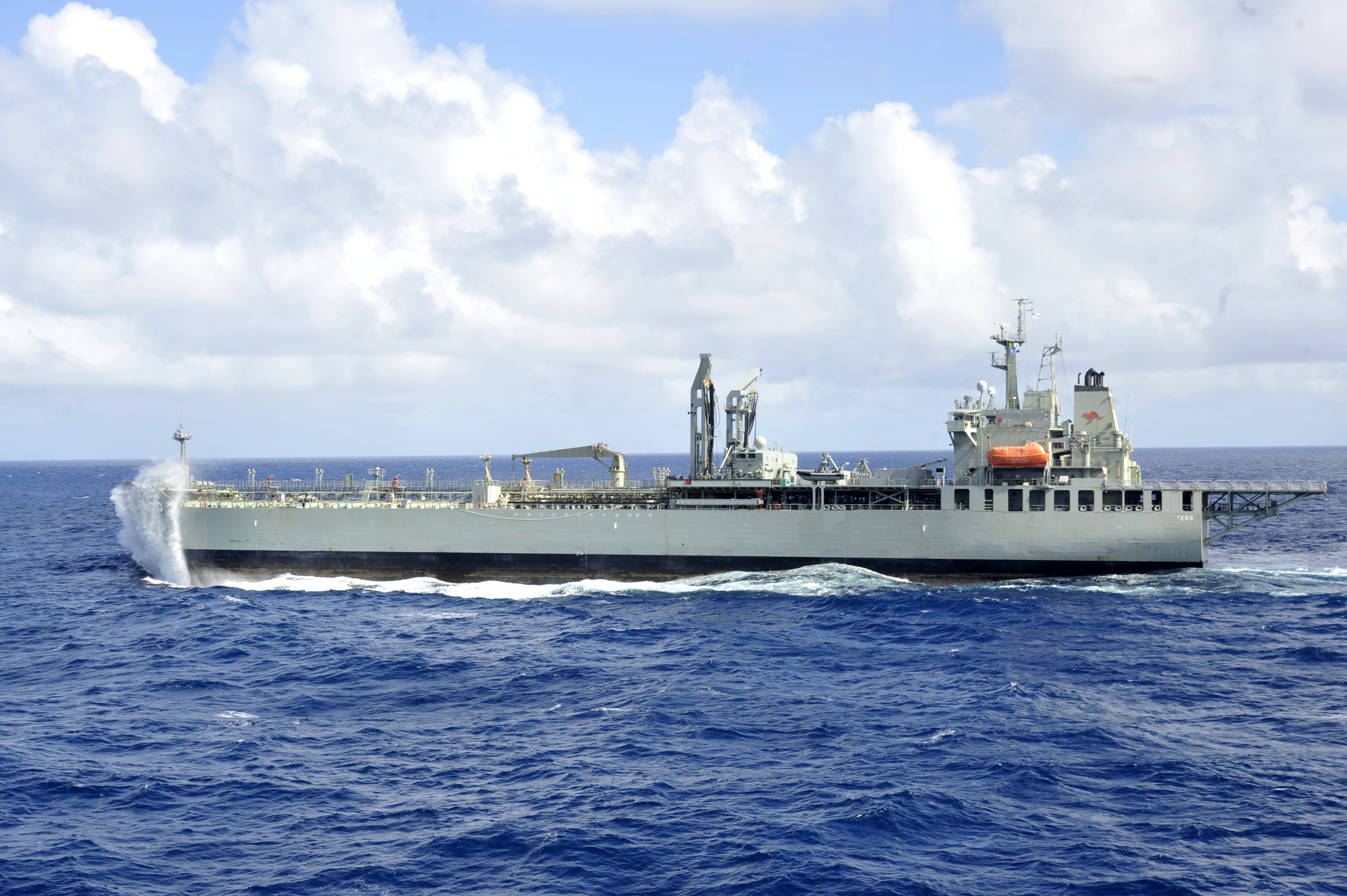
- HMAS Sirius in July 2013

History

Australia
- Name: Sirius
- Namesake: HMS Sirius Flagship of the First Fleet
- Builder: Hyundai Mipo Dockyard
- Yard number: 228
- Laid down: 19 January 2004
- Launched: 12 April 2004
- Acquired: 3 June 2004
- Commissioned: 16 September 2006
- Decommissioned: 18 December 2021
- Renamed: MT Delos (during construction)
- Home port: Fleet Base West, Perth
- Identification: IMO number: 9283772; MMSI number: 503170000; Callsign: VKSI
- Motto: To Serve and Provide
- Fate: Scrapped at Henderson in 2022
- Badge

General characteristics
- Type: Fleet replenishment vessel
- Displacement: 46,755 tonnes (full load)
- Length: 191.3 m (627 ft 7 in)
- Beam: 32 m (105 ft 0 in)
- Draught: 11 m (36 ft 1 in)
- Propulsion: 1 × Hyundai B&W6S50MC, 1 × shaft
- Speed: 16.5 knots (30.6 km/h; 19.0 mph)
- Range: 16,000 nmi (30,000 km; 18,000 mi) at 14 knots (26 km/h; 16 mph)
- Capacity: 34,806 m^{3} (1,229,200 cu ft) of fuel (including 5,486 m^{3} (193,700 cu ft) aviation fuel); 240 tonnes dry stores
- Complement: 8 officers, 46 sailors
- Armament: 5 × 12.7 mm machine guns
- Aviation facilities: Helicopter deck, no hangar facilities

HMAS Sirius (O 266) (formerly MT Delos) was a commercial tanker purchased by the Royal Australian Navy and converted into a fleet replenishment vessel to replace HMAS Westralia. She was named in honour of HMS Sirius of the First Fleet. Launched in South Korea on 2004, and converted in Western Australia, Sirius was commissioned in 2006; three years before a purpose-built vessel would have been built, and at half the cost. The tanker was decommissioned in 2021 and subsequently scrapped.

== Construction and acquisition ==
Delos was built at Hyundai Mipo Dockyard in South Korea. Another five ships were built to the same design, all for civilian service. She was launched on 12 April 2004, and was purchased by the Australian Government on 3 June 2004 and handed over from Hyundai on 16 June 2004, with the intention of modifying her as a replacement for HMAS Westralia for the Royal Australian Navy (RAN). Delos was leased (bareboat charter) to Teekay Shipping for operation as a commercial oil tanker until September 2005, then was taken up by Tenix Defence (which had been awarded the A$60 million conversion contract on 15 March 2005) for conversion into a replenishment vessel, which was completed 5 weeks ahead of schedule. Sirius was commissioned into the RAN on 16 September 2006, in a ceremony that included Westralia's decommissioning. While HMAS Sirius is the first ship of this name to serve as part of the RAN, she is named after HMS Sirius, the flagship of the First Fleet of British convicts sent to Australia in 1788.

Sirius had a full load displacement of 46,775 tonnes, is 191.3 metres (627 ft 7 in) in length, with a beam of 32 metres (105 ft 0 in) and a draught of 11 metres (36 ft 1 in). Propulsion machinery consisted of a single propeller shaft driven by a single Hyundai B&W 6S 50MC diesel engine, supplemented by a bow thruster. Top speed was 16.5 knots (30.6 km/h; 19.0 mph), and the ship had a range of 16,000 nautical miles (30,000 km; 18,000 mi) at 14 knots (26 km/h; 16 mph). Sirius could carry up to 34,806 cubic metres (1,229,200 cu ft) of fuel, including 5,486 cubic metres (193,700 cu ft) of helicopter aviation fuel, plus 240 tonnes of dry stores carried in a container deck designed for twelve 20-foot (6.1 m) intermodal containers. Modifications by Tenix included the fitting of two replenishment points (one on each side, allowing the underway replenishment of two ships simultaneously), installation of a helicopter deck aft of the superstructure, fitting of the container deck, addition of two 70-man lifeboats and two rigid-hulled inflatable boats (RHIBs) (the latter sourced from Westralia), and modification of the internal layout and equipment to bring it to naval standards. Sirius was armed with five 12.7-millimetre (0.50 in) machine guns for self defence. The ship's company included 8 officers and 46 sailors.

Originally, the RAN planned to have a ship specially constructed for the role. The decision to instead purchase an under-construction civilian tanker and modify her for military service allowed Sirius to enter service three years before originally planned, at half the acquisition project's planned cost.

== Operational history ==
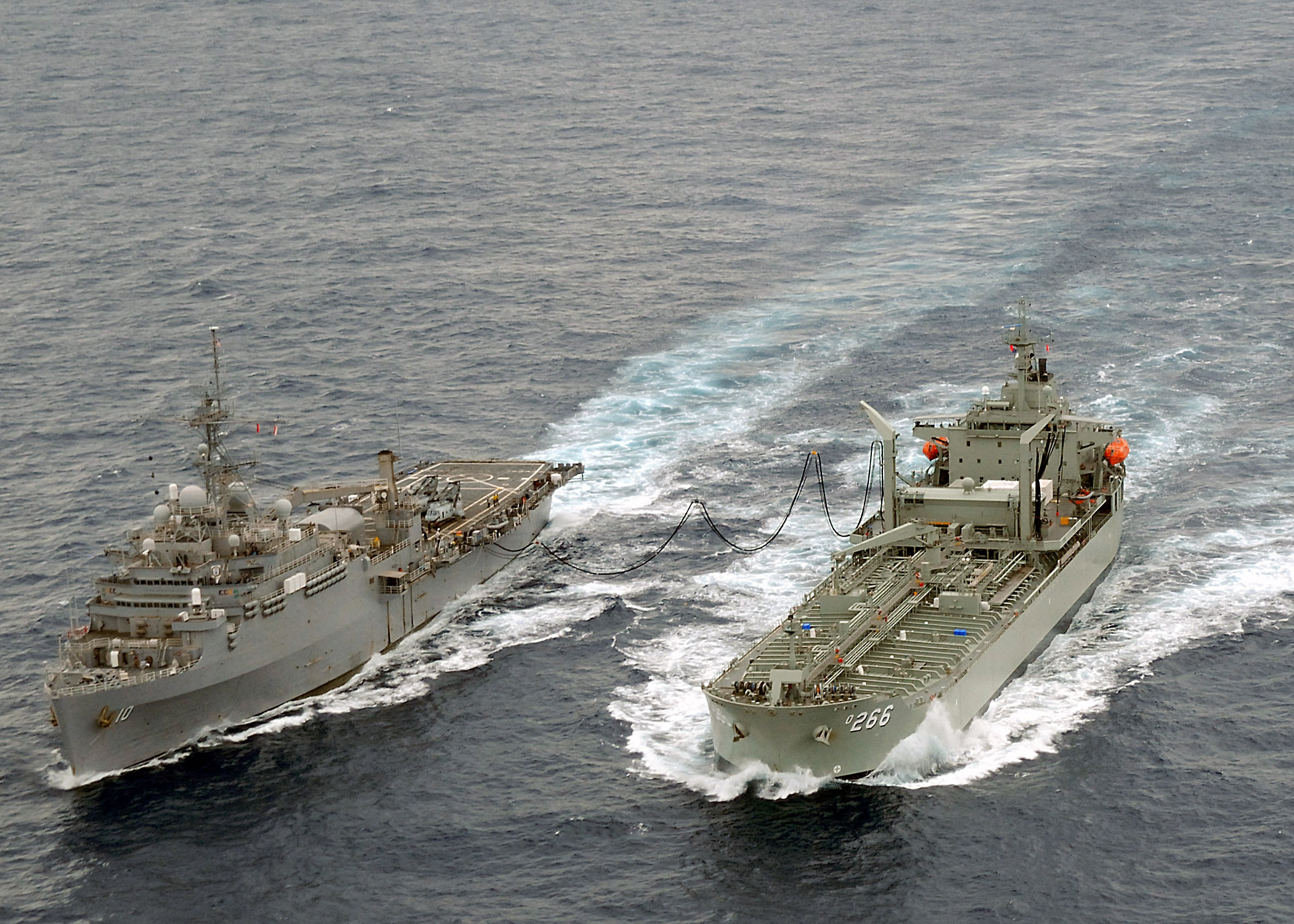
HMAS Sirius (right) refuelling USS Juneau in 2007

On the morning of 13 March 2009, Sirius was one of seventeen warships involved in a ceremonial fleet entry and fleet review in Sydney Harbour, the largest collection of RAN ships since the Australian Bicentenary in 1988. Sirius did not participate in the fleet entry, but was anchored in the harbour for the review.

In 2010, Sirius was approved to carry and deploy boarding parties. This capability was tested during Exercise Kakadu 10, along with the ship's first ever dual replenishment.

Sirius was forced to turn back en route to the RIMPAC 2010 exercise in Hawaii due to problems with her engine, and did not participate in the exercise as a result.

The tanker completed a six-month maintenance period in Sydney on 16 September 2014; she spent five months of this period out of the water in the Captain Cook Graving Dock.

HMAS Sirius joined HMAS Stuart, KDB Darulehsan, USS Rafael Peralta and RSS Supreme on their way to Pearl Harbor, Hawaii in preparation for RIMPAC 2020 on 6 August 2020. RIMPAC 2020 began on 17 August.

== End of service ==
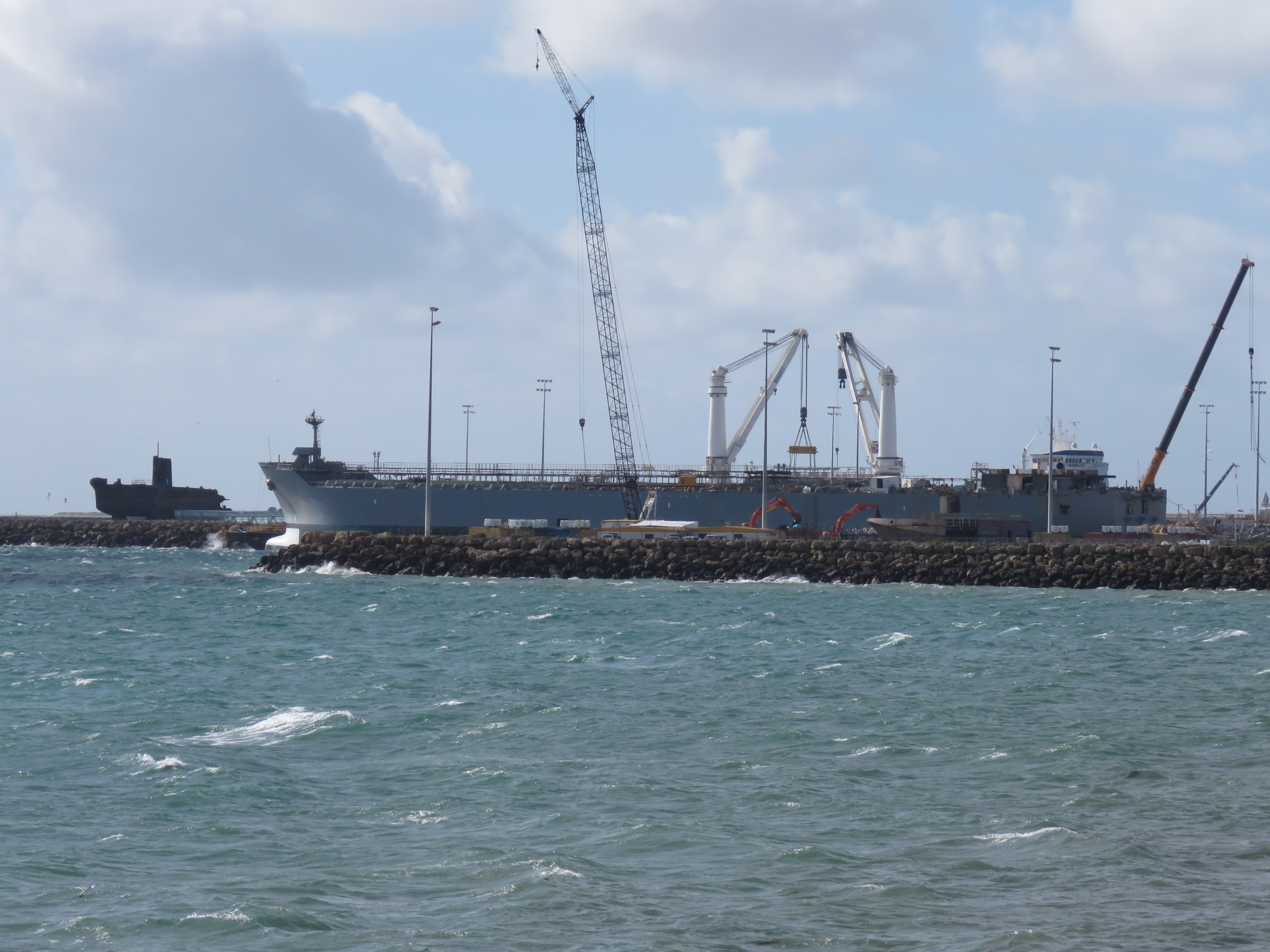
The decommissioned HMAS Sirius being scrapped in October 2022. To the left, the Oberon-class submarine HMAS Otama can be seen, also to be scrapped.

Sirius was originally expected to remain in service for approximately 15 years. In 2012, the ship was predicted to remain in service until the early 2020s. The 2013 Defence White Paper stated that the replacement of Sirius and HMAS Success would be brought forward. As well as building replacement vessels (either in Australia, overseas, or a combination), leasing existing vessels was also to be considered.

In June 2014, the Minister for Defence announced that two companies had been invited to a restricted tender competition. Spanish shipbuilder Navantia offered the Cantabria design, while South Korea's DSME proposed the downsized Aegir variant of the Tide-class tanker. The 20,000+ tonne ships were to be built overseas, as they would be too large to build in Australian shipyards. Australia considered the design for their replacement tankers, with Navantia competing against the Aegir variant of the Tide-class tanker built by South Korea's DSME in a restricted tender competition. Navantia's proposal based on Cantabria was announced as the successful design in the Australian tender in March 2016, with an expected in-service date for the first of two Supply-class replenishment oilers in late 2020. The ship was commissioned on 10 April 2021 at Fleet Base East, Sydney.

In September 2021 Sirius embarked on her final deployment to South-East Asia and the south-west Pacific prior to her decommissioning in December 2021. She was decommissioned at a ceremony at HMAS Stirling on 18 December 2021.

She was scrapped at Australian Maritime Complex facility near Perth between 2022 and 2024.

== See also ==
- MV Asterix - commercial container vessel converted to replenishing ship for Royal Canadian Navy
