= Supply, Virginia =

Unincorporated community in Virginia, United States

Coordinates: 38.0942996°N 77.1360865°W

Supply is an unincorporated area in Essex County, Virginia, United States.

== History ==
A post office called Supply was established in 1898. The origin of the name "Supply" is obscure.
