= USS Supply =

Four ships in the United States Navy have been named USS Supply.

- USS Supply (1846), a sailing ship purchased in 1846 for service in the Mexican–American War which later served in the American Civil War.
- USS Supply (1872), an iron steamer purchased by the Navy in 1898 which served in the Spanish–American War and the First World War.
- USS Supply (AVS-1), an aviation supply ship, built in 1921, acquired by the Navy in 1944 and decommissioned in 1946.
- USNS Supply (T-AOE-6), the lead ship of Supply-class of fast combat support ships was commissioned in 1994, decommissioned from active duty and transferred to MSC in 2001.
