= Rafael Peralta =

Recipient of the Navy Cross

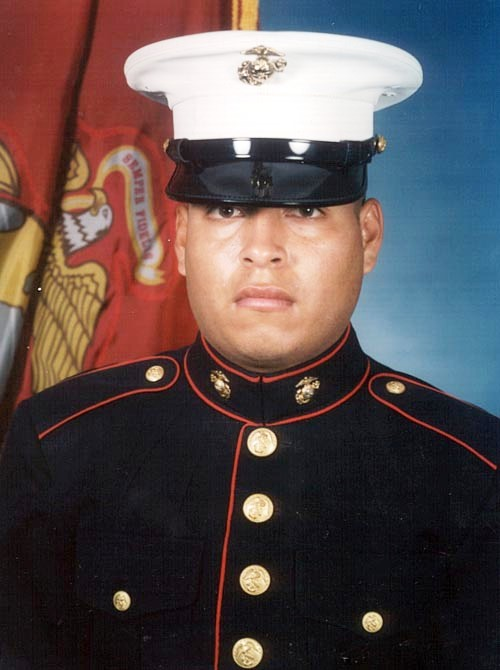
- Born: April 7, 1979; Mexico City, Mexico
- Died: November 15, 2004 (aged 25); Fallujah, Iraq
- Burial place: Fort Rosecrans National Cemetery
- Military career
- Allegiance: United States
- Branch: United States Marine Corps
- Service years: 2000–2004
- Rank: Sergeant
- Unit: 1st Battalion, 3rd Marines
- Conflicts: Iraq War; Second Battle of Fallujah
- Awards: Navy Cross; Purple Heart

Rafael Peralta (April 7, 1979 – November 15, 2004) was a United States Marine killed in combat during the Second Battle of Fallujah during the Iraq War. In September 2008 his family was notified that he was awarded the Navy Cross, the second-highest award a United States Marine can receive. In February 2012, Secretary of the Navy Ray Mabus announced that a new Arleigh Burke-class destroyer would be named USS Rafael Peralta.

== Early life and career ==
Peralta was born on April 7, 1979, in Mexico City. The son of Rafael and Rosa Peralta (nee Romero), and the oldest of four (his siblings are Icela, Karen, and Ricardo), he immigrated to the United States. Peralta's father died in a workplace accident, leaving him head of the household. After his 1997 graduation from Morse High School in San Diego he attended San Diego City College and served in the California Conservation Corps as a crewleader from 1998 to 1999. He joined the United States Marine Corps when he received his green card in 2000, and became a United States citizen while serving in the Marine Corps.

Peralta reportedly served the United States with enthusiasm and patriotism: "In his parents' home, on his bedroom walls hung only three items – a copy of the United States Constitution, the Bill of Rights and his boot camp graduation certificate. Before he set out for Fallujah he wrote to his 14-year-old brother, 'Be proud of me, bro ...and be proud of being an American.'"

=== Death ===
On November 15, 2004, the 25-year-old Peralta deployed to Iraq as a sergeant and scout team leader assigned to Company A, 1st Battalion, 3rd Marine Regiment to clear houses in the Second Battle of Fallujah. Although Peralta was not assigned to enter the buildings, he did so.

Peralta led his team through three house-clearings before charging into the fourth house. After finding two rooms empty on the ground floor he opened a third door and was hit multiple times with AK-47 fire, leaving him severely wounded. Peralta fell to the floor, moving aside to enable the Marines behind him to return fire.

The insurgents threw a hand grenade at the Marines, and the two Marines with Peralta tried to get out of the room but could not. Still conscious on the floor, despite his wounds Peralta reportedly pulled the grenade under his body, absorbing most of the blast and shrapnel. He died instantly, but saved the lives of his fellow Marines. Peralta is buried in Fort Rosecrans National Cemetery in San Diego, California.

== Posthumous award ==
First Marine Division commander, Lieutenant General Richard F. Natonski, recommended Peralta for the Medal of Honor, based on reports by seven Marines present (or nearby) when he died.

On September 17, 2008, Natonski notified Peralta's family that he would receive the Navy Cross instead of the Medal of Honor. Secretary of Defense Robert Gates rejected the Marine Corps recommendation, saying that his panel unanimously confirmed that Peralta's actions did not meet the Medal of Honor standard "without any possibility of error or doubt". Gates' central argument related to whether the already-mortally-wounded Peralta could have intentionally reached for the grenade, shielding his fellow Marines from the blast. During a Marine Corps investigation of the attack Natonski had said, "I believe beyond a shadow of a doubt" that the gravely-wounded Peralta covered the grenade. Doubt arose when some believed that Peralta was clinically dead when the grenade was thrown.

After it was announced that Peralta would receive the Navy Cross instead, a number of people requested reconsideration, with the congressional delegations from California and Hawaii and the Congressional Hispanic Caucus requesting a presidential review of Gates' decision. Lawmakers continued their efforts; of seven nominations for the Medal of Honor reaching the Secretary of Defense, Peralta's was the only one not approved.

In March 2012 the Marine Corps Times reported that navy officials were reviewing new evidence related to Peralta's case, including two videos (one by Marine combat photographer Steve Sebby) and a pathology report. The evidence was provided by California Representative Duncan D. Hunter, who served with 1st Battalion, 11th Marines during Operation Vigilant Resolve (the first battle for Fallujah). In December 2012 the Department of Defense announced that the Navy Cross would not be upgraded, with Secretary of Defense Leon Panetta saying that he did not want to overturn his predecessor's decision. Hunter said he would appeal, introducing a resolution co-sponsored by fellow California Representative Xavier Becerra which recommended that Peralta receive the Medal of Honor. When Chuck Hagel replaced Panetta as Secretary of Defense, Hunter hoped he would be more receptive to the new evidence. However, in February 2014 Hagel announced that Peralta's Medal of Honor nomination would not be reconsidered. In June 2015 Peralta's mother, Rosa Maria, received the Navy Cross at a Camp Pendleton ceremony.

In February 2017, Hunter renewed his efforts to have Peralta' Navy Cross upgraded, by petitioning Secretary of Defense James Mattis.

== Awards and honors ==
Peralta's awards include:

1st row	Navy Cross	Purple Heart	Combat Action Ribbon
2nd row	Marine Corps Good Conduct Medal	National Defense Service Medal	Iraq Campaign Medal with campaign star
3rd row	Global War on Terrorism Expeditionary Medal	Global War on Terrorism Service Medal	Navy Sea Service Deployment Ribbon

=== Navy Cross citation ===
The President of the United States takes pride in presenting the NAVY CROSS posthumously to

SERGEANT
RAFAEL PERALTA
UNITED STATES MARINE CORPS

for service as set forth in the following

CITATION:

For extraordinary heroism while serving as Platoon Guide with 1st Platoon, Company A, 1st Battalion, 3d Marines, Regimental Combat Team 7, 1st Marine Division, in action against Anti-Coalition Forces in support of Operation AL FAJR, in Fallujah, Iraq on 15 November 2004. Clearing scores of houses in the previous three days, Sergeant Peralta' asked to join an under strength squad and volunteered to stand post the night of 14 November, allowing fellow Marines more time to rest. The following morning, during search and attack operations, while clearing the seventh house of the day, the point man opened a door to a back room and immediately came under intense, close-range automatic weapons fire from multiple insurgents. The squad returned fire, wounding one insurgent. While attempting to maneuver out of the line of fire, Sergeant Peralta was shot and fell mortally wounded. After the initial exchange of gunfire, the insurgents broke contact, throwing a fragmentation grenade as they fled the building. The grenade came to rest near Sergeant Peralta's head. Without hesitation and with complete disregard for his own personal safety, Sergeant Peralta reached out and pulled the grenade to his body, absorbing the brunt of the blast and shielding fellow Marines only feet away. Sergeant Peralta succumbed to his wounds. By his undaunted courage, intrepid fighting spirit, and unwavering devotion to duty, Sergeant Peralta reflected great credit upon himself and upheld the highest traditions of the Marine Corps and the United States Naval Service."

== Legacy ==
On April 24, 2006, San Diego Police Department Chief of Police William Lansdowne posthumously awarded Sgt. Peralta the honorary title of San Diego police officer for his heroism in Iraq. Peralta had long wanted to be a San Diego police officer, and the badge was presented to his mother.

On September 21, 2007, the 31st Marine Expeditionary Unit command-post building 2533 at Camp Hansen, Okinawa was renamed Peralta Hall in his honor. The History Channel produced a one-hour documentary in Spanish and English about Peralta, Act of Honor, which appeared on THC Classroom.

With Peralta's death benefit, his mother purchased a home in Chula Vista. Inspired by his older brother's actions, Rafael's brother Ricardo also enlisted in the Marine Corps and graduated from the School of Infantry in 2010. He was honorably discharged in January 2014, after serving in Afghanistan.

Following legislative action by Congressman Hunter, Secretary of the Navy Ray Mabus announced on February 16, 2012, that one of several new Arleigh Burke-class guided-missile destroyers would be named USS Rafael Peralta (DDG-115), According to Peralta's mother, the destroyer will carry his Navy Cross. In Quantico, Virginia, Peralta's rifle and the last letter he wrote will be placed on display. In July 2017, the ship bearing his name was commissioned at Naval Air Station North Island, with his mother, the ship's sponsor, and several other dignitaries aboard (Susan Davis, Kevin Faulconer, Duncan Hunter, Darrell Issa, and Scott Peters).

In November 2017, a brick with his name was placed in front of the Veteran Resource Center at Southwestern College, where he had previously gone to attend its police academy.

== See also ==
- Hispanics in the United States Marine Corps
