= HMAS Success (OR 304) =

Former Durance-class multi-product replenishment oiler of RAN

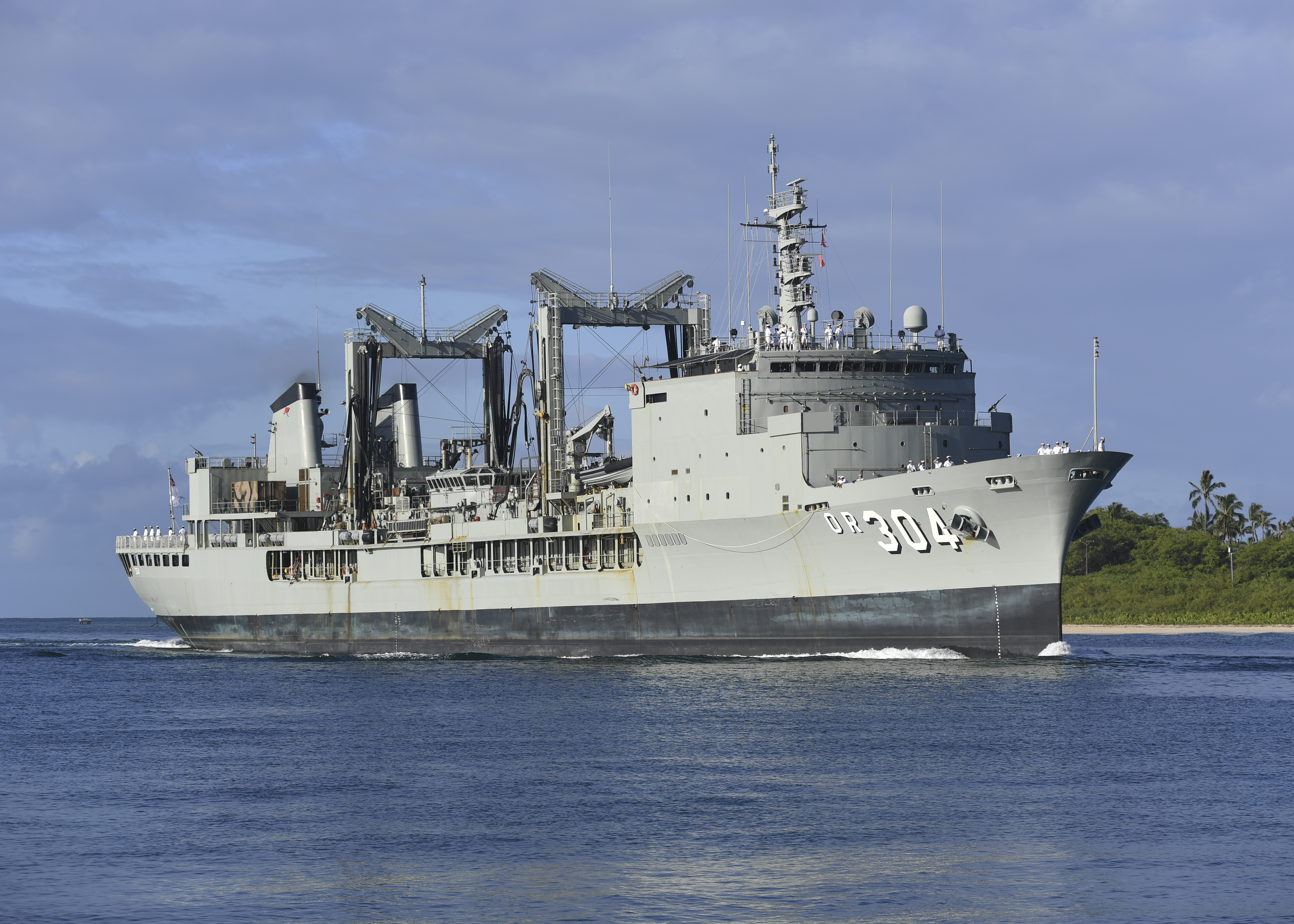
- HMAS Success in June 2018

History

Australia
- Namesake: HMAS Success (H02)
- Builder: Cockatoo Docks & Engineering Company
- Laid down: 9 August 1980
- Launched: 3 March 1984
- Commissioned: 23 April 1986
- Decommissioned: 29 June 2019
- Home port: Fleet Base East, Sydney
- Identification: MMSI number: 503119000; Callsign: VLNN
- Motto: "Strive to Win"
- Nickname(s): Battle Tanker
- Honours and awards: Battle honours: Kuwait 1991; East Timor 1999
- Fate: Scrapped 2019
- Badge

General characteristics
- Class & type: Durance-class replenishment oiler
- Displacement: 18,221 tonnes (full load)
- Length: 157.2 m (515 ft 9 in)
- Beam: 21.2 m (69 ft 7 in)
- Draught: 8.6 m (28 ft 3 in)
- Propulsion: 2 × SEMT-Pielstick 16 PC2.5 V 400 diesel engines, driving two shafts
- Speed: 20 knots (37 km/h; 23 mph)
- Range: 8,616 nmi (15,957 km; 9,915 mi) at 15 knots (28 km/h; 17 mph)
- Boats & landing craft carried: 1 × LCVP
- Capacity: 8,707 tonnes diesel; 975 tonnes aviation fuel; 250 tonnes munitions; 116 tonnes water; 95 tonnes naval stores; 57 tonnes consumables
- Complement: 25 officer, 212 sailors
- Sensors & processing systems: 2 × Kelvin Hughes Type 100G radars
- Armament: 7 × 12.7 mm machine guns; 1 × Phalanx Mk 15 close-in weapon systems (fitted for but not with)
- Aircraft carried: 1 × helicopter (Sea King, Seahawk, Squirrel, or MRH-90)
- Aviation facilities: Aft hangar and helipad for single helicopter

HMAS Success (OR 304) was a Durance-class multi-product replenishment oiler that previously served in the Royal Australian Navy (RAN). Built by Cockatoo Docks & Engineering Company in Sydney, Australia, during the 1980s, she is the only ship of the class to be constructed outside France, and the only one to not originally serve in the Marine Nationale (French Navy). The ship was part of the Australian contribution to the 1991 Gulf War, and was deployed to East Timor in response to incidents in 1999 and 2006. The ship was fitted with a double hull during the first half of 2011, to meet International Maritime Organization standards.

Success was decommissioned at Fleet Base East on 29 June 2019, after 33 years of service, and towed to Port Pirie for scrapping in August 2019.

== Construction ==
Seeing a need to replace the ageing oiler HMAS Supply (AO 195), the RAN placed an order in 1971 for a combat support ship-a replenishment vessel capable of supplying ammunition and stores in addition to fuel-to be named HMAS Protector. However, concerns about the cost of construction prompted the order's cancellation in 1974. Instead, the Directions Techniques Des Constructions Navales was approached about constructing a Durance-class replenishment oiler for the RAN, and a design contract was awarded to the Government of France in 1977. The $68.4 million (in 1978 prices) construction contract was awarded to Vickers Cockatoo Dockyard in October 1979, with ship delivery by 31 July 1983.

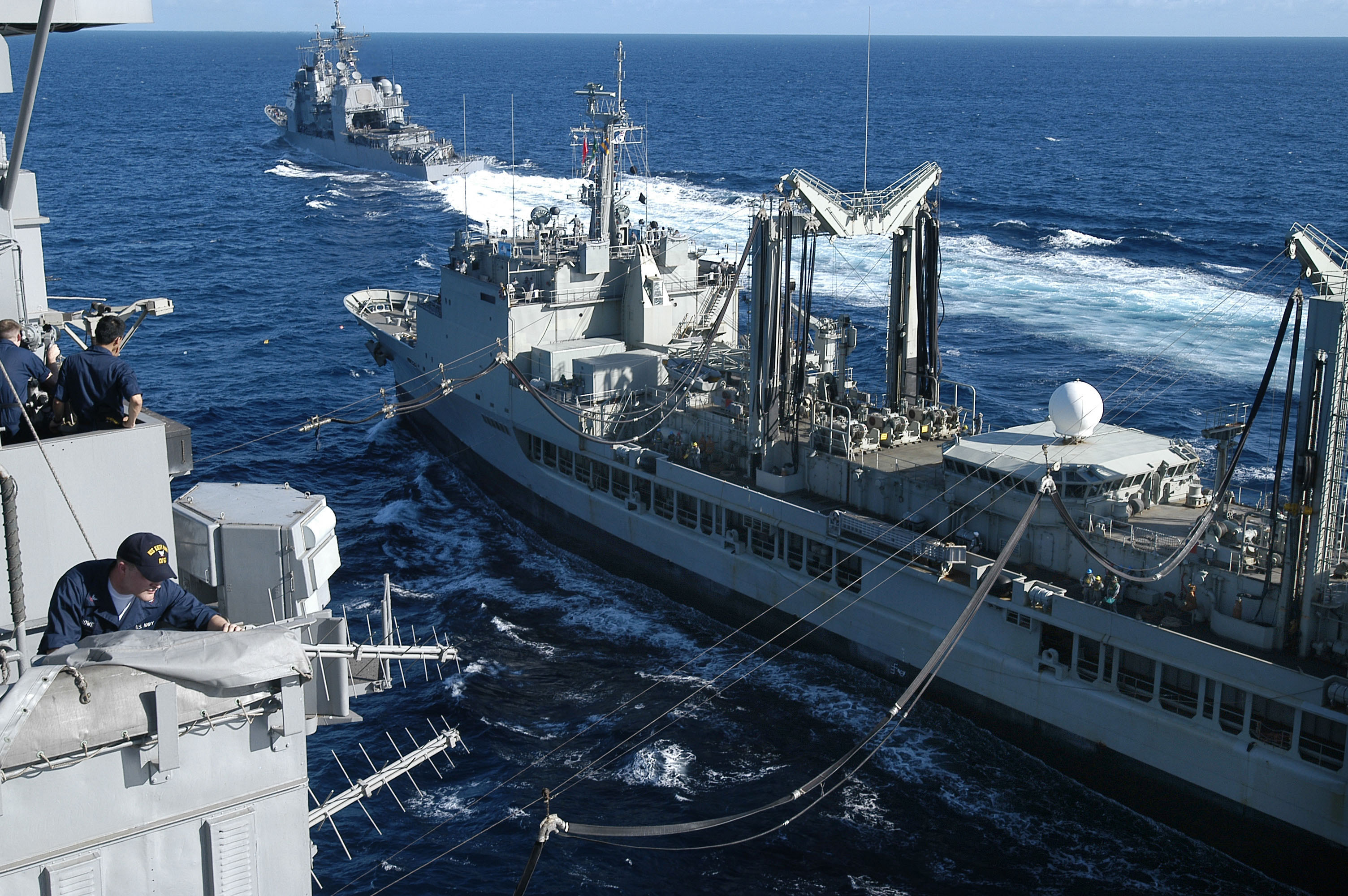
Fuel lines being transferred from Success's port replenishment points to the aircraft carrier USS Kitty Hawk, during a replenishment at sea in 2005. The cruiser USS Cowpens has just completed replenishment on the starboard side, and is pulling away.

The modified Durance-class oiler is 157.2 metres (516 ft) in length, with a beam of 21.2 metres (70 ft), and a draught of 8.6 metres (28 ft), with a full load displacement of 18,221 tonnes. Propulsion machinery consists of two SEMT-Pielstick 16 PC2.5 V 400 diesel motors, which supply 20,800 horsepower (15,500 kW) to the ship's two propeller shafts. Top speed is 20 knots (37 km/h; 23 mph), and the ship has a range of 8,616 nautical miles (15,957 km; 9,915 mi) at 15 knots (28 km/h; 17 mph). Success has a total capacity of 10,200 tonnes of cargo: 8,707 tonnes of diesel fuel, 975 tonnes of aviation fuel, 250 tonnes of munitions (including guided missiles and torpedoes), 116 tonnes of water, 95 tonnes of components and naval stores, and 57 tonnes of food and other consumables. Fuel and liquid stores can be transferred from four points (two on each side), allowing Success to replenish two ships simultaneously, while solid cargo can be moved via vertical replenishment (with a hangar and helipad for a single Sea King, Seahawk, or Squirrel helicopter), or by boat (the RAN LCVP T 7 is carried on a starboard FWD davit). The ship is armed with seven 12.7 mm machine guns, and is fitted for but not with a Mark 15 Phalanx CIWS. The sensor suite includes two Kelvin Hughes Type 100G navigation radars. Ship's company is made up of 25 officers and 212 sailors.

Success was laid down by Cockatoo Docks & Engineering Company at the Cockatoo Island Dockyard in Sydney on 9 August 1980. She was launched on 3 March 1984, and commissioned into the RAN on 23 April 1986. Success is the largest ship to ever be built in Australia for the RAN, and is the largest ship to be built in Port Jackson (the port of Sydney). She was also the last major vessel to be constructed at Cockatoo Island Dockyard. In June 1983 the contract were renegotiated while construction was underway, with the acceptance date being extended by three years and the project cost increased to $187.3 million. The cost and time overruns were primarily due to protracted dispute between the Commonwealth and the builder over the drawings and specifications received from France, with evidence that the Department of Defence underestimated the extent of the differences between the original Australian building specifications and those supplied. Additional factors in the time and cost increases were a lack of tradesmen skilled in naval construction, overly bureaucratic management, and low labour productivity. The final project cost was estimated at $197.41 million; the dramatic increase in cost prevented the construction of a planned second ship.

== Operational history ==
In 1986, Success was part of the multi-national fleet that entered Sydney Harbour to mark the 75th anniversary of the RAN. Prior to the ceremonial entry, Success and two other replenishment ships (one United States Navy, one Royal Navy) were tasked with replenishing the assembled fleet: a competition between the three ships saw Success replenish more vessels than the other two.

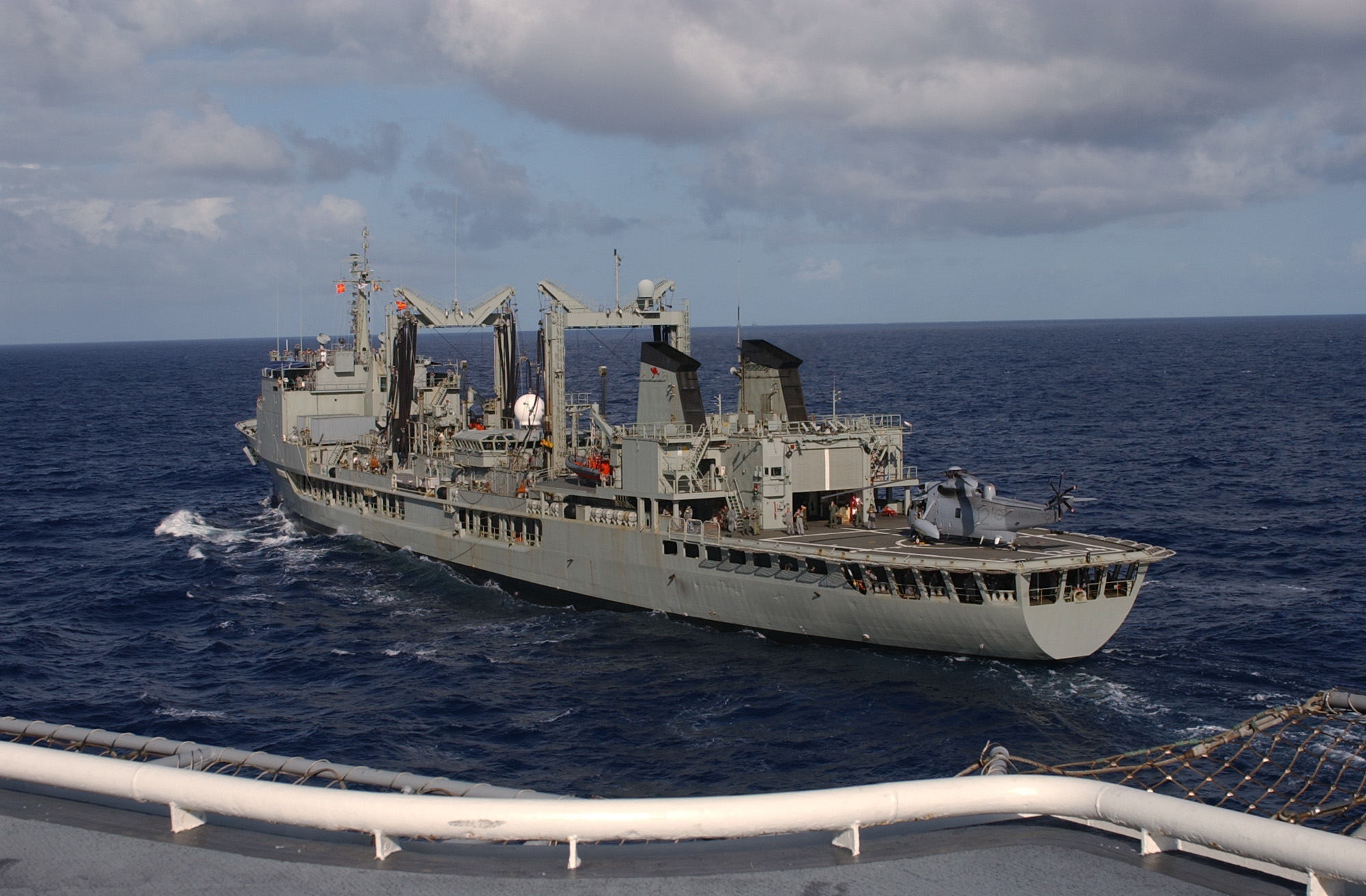
Port quarter view of Success, showing the ship's helicopter hangar and an embarked Sea King helicopter

Success formed part of the Australian contribution to the 1991 Gulf War. The ship was deployed to East Timor as part of the Australian-led INTERFET peacekeeping taskforce from 19 September to 28 October 1999. Although not recognised at the time, an overhaul of the RAN battle honours system, completed in March 2010, saw Success granted the honours "Kuwait 1991" and "East Timor 1999" for these deployments.

In 2005, Success was one of several Australian warships to participate in Exercise Talisman Sabre 2005, a series of joint RAN-USN war games.

During 2006, Success was deployed to East Timor as part of the Australian response to the 2006 East Timorese crisis. In late November 2006, Success was one of three Australian warships sent to Fiji during the leadup to the 2006 coup d'état by Fijian military forces against Prime Minister Laisenia Qarase. Success joined HMA Ships Newcastle and Kanimbla; the other two ships having sailed in the first week of November. The three vessels were to be used in the event of an evacuation of Australian citizens and nationals, but not as a military force. The task group was stood down in late December 2006, with all three ships returning to port.

On 20 February 2007, Success intercepted a boat carrying 85 Sri Lankan asylum seekers. These were the last asylum seekers to be processed under the Pacific Solution policy before its cancellation.

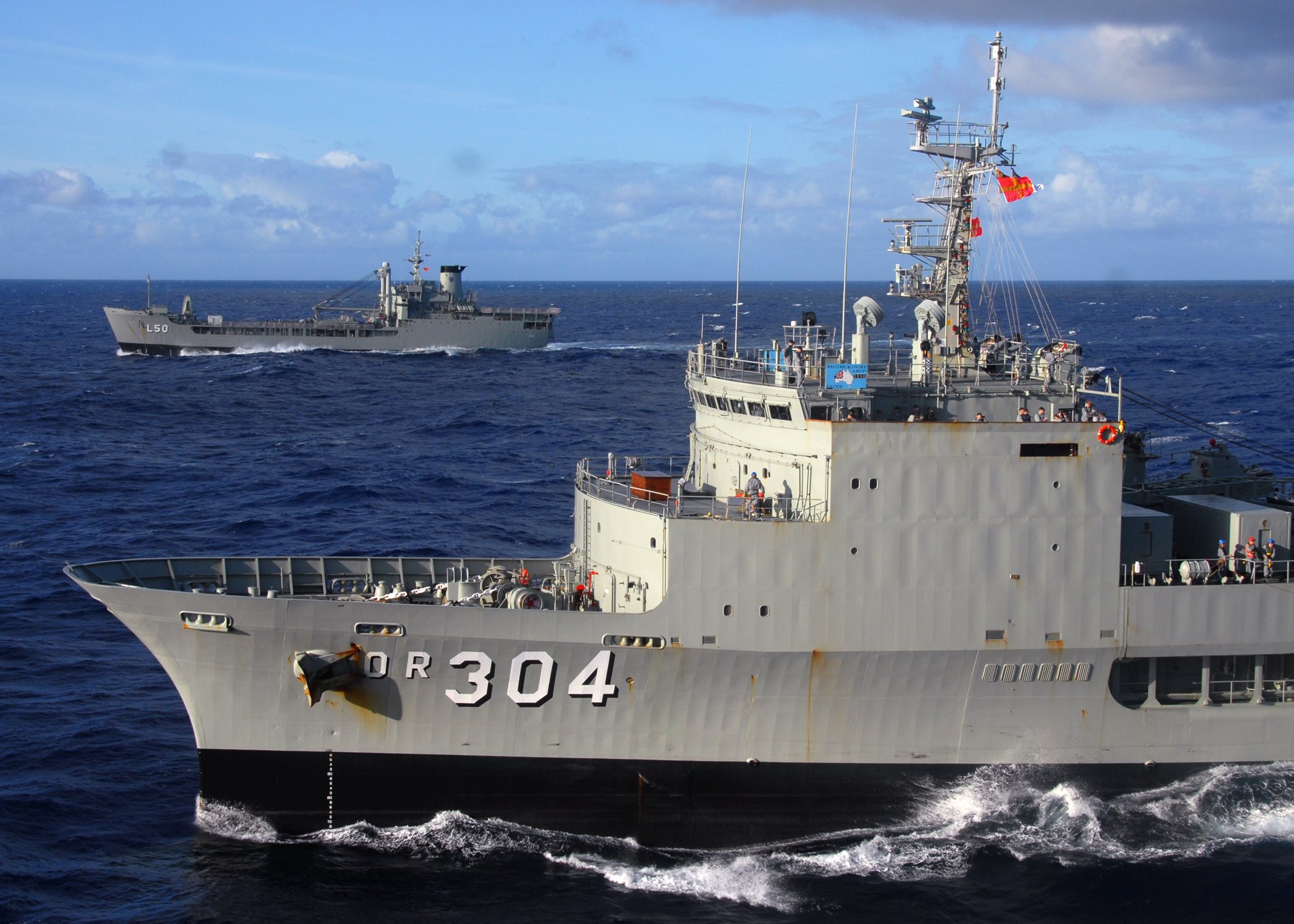
HMAS Success sailing alongside HMAS Tobruk during RIMPAC 08

Success was deployed as part of Operation Resolute for three months in 2008. While assigned to Resolute, the vessel was deployed with several other RAN vessels to take part in RIMPAC 08, a multi-national naval exercise. During RIMPAC, on the night of 23 July, Success completed her 3,000th replenishment at sea (RAS) during a dual-replenishment of USS Chung-Hoon (port side, 2,999th RAS) and Anzac (starboard side, 3,000th RAS).

On the morning of 13 March 2009, Success was one of seventeen warships involved in a ceremonial fleet entry and fleet review in Sydney Harbour, the largest collection of RAN ships since the Australian Bicentenary in 1988. The replenishment ship was one of the thirteen vessels involved in the ceremonial entry through Sydney Heads, and anchored in the harbour for the review.

In May 2009, while Success was on exercise in South-East Asia, the ship's commanding officer was alerted to an alleged sex gambling game aboard, which challenged male sailors to record their sexual activities with female sailors in a 'ledger', and awarded them prize money based on with whom or where they had sex. This was one of several incidents during the three-month deployment; two bars in Manila were damaged during shore leave, while at another bar in Qingdao, several sailors were involved in a public sex act. Three male sailors were removed from Success when the ship docked in Singapore, and were sent back to Australia to participate in a formal inquiry; this inquiry was found to be flawed because of bias and the denial of support to the three accused, and a second, independent inquiry was set up under former judge Roger Gyles in February 2010. The first part of Gyles' inquiry report was released in February 2011, which stated that there was an entrenched culture of sexual harassment, bullying, and predatory sexual behaviour towards female sailors, coupled with alcohol-fuelled misconduct, particularly amongst the male sailors of the ship's marine engineering department. Gyles found that although the harassment and misconduct had been occurring as early as 2004, failures to respond to earlier complaints led to a breakdown in discipline aboard Success. The former judge was unable to prove the existence of the claimed ledger, but found many of the other claims to be correct, including evidence that male sailors had placed bets around having sex with a particular female sailor.

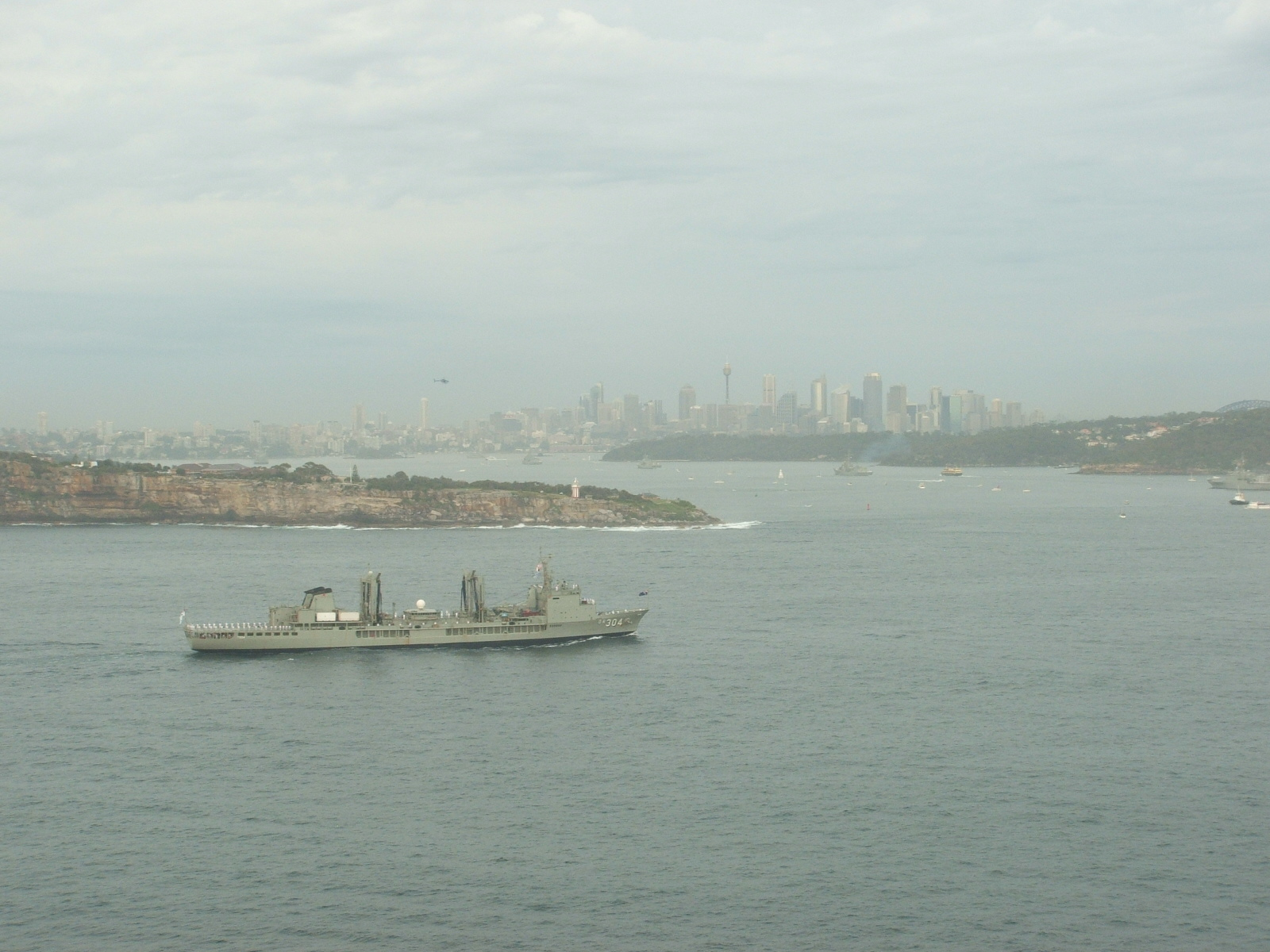
Success entering Sydney Harbour during the 2009 ceremonial fleet entry

At the end of 2009, the Department of Defence released a request for tender for modification of Success into a double hull vessel, allowing her to meet International Maritime Organization standards for oil tankers. The tender was awarded to Singapore-based ST Marine (a subsidiary of ST Engineering), with the conversion to be made during 2011. The ship sailed to Singapore in November for a naval exercise, after which she was to enter dock for the 14-week conversion, but problems in the contract delayed the dockyard start date, and Success was ordered back to Sydney, via HMAS Stirling in Western Australia, so the ship's company could take leave with family while the contract was finalised. Work on the ship started in late December 2010, with the main conversion work completed by the end of April 2011. In May 2011, a civilian contractor working on the ship died after falling overboard. Success left Singapore in late May, and returned to Sydney.

Success underwent a major refit for most of 2013. During this time, the Spanish oiler Cantabria was deployed to Australian waters to operate in support of RAN assets, while providing the opportunity to train Australian personnel on systems similar to those in the Spanish-designed Hobart- and Canberra-class ships being acquired. In October 2013, Success participated in the International Fleet Review 2013 in Sydney. In late 2013, the ship was the testbed for flight trials of the MRH 90 helicopter.

In March 2014, Success was deployed to assist in efforts to locate and retrieve possible wreckage from Malaysia Airlines Flight 370 that had been detected on satellite images of the southern Indian Ocean. In late November 2014, Success deployed to the Middle East for a six-month period to provide logistic support to coalition naval units as part of Operation Manitou, replacing the Australian frigate usually deployed in the region.

In February 2015, Success was awarded the Gloucester Cup for 2014, marking the ship as the most proficient in the RAN for that year.

== Fate ==
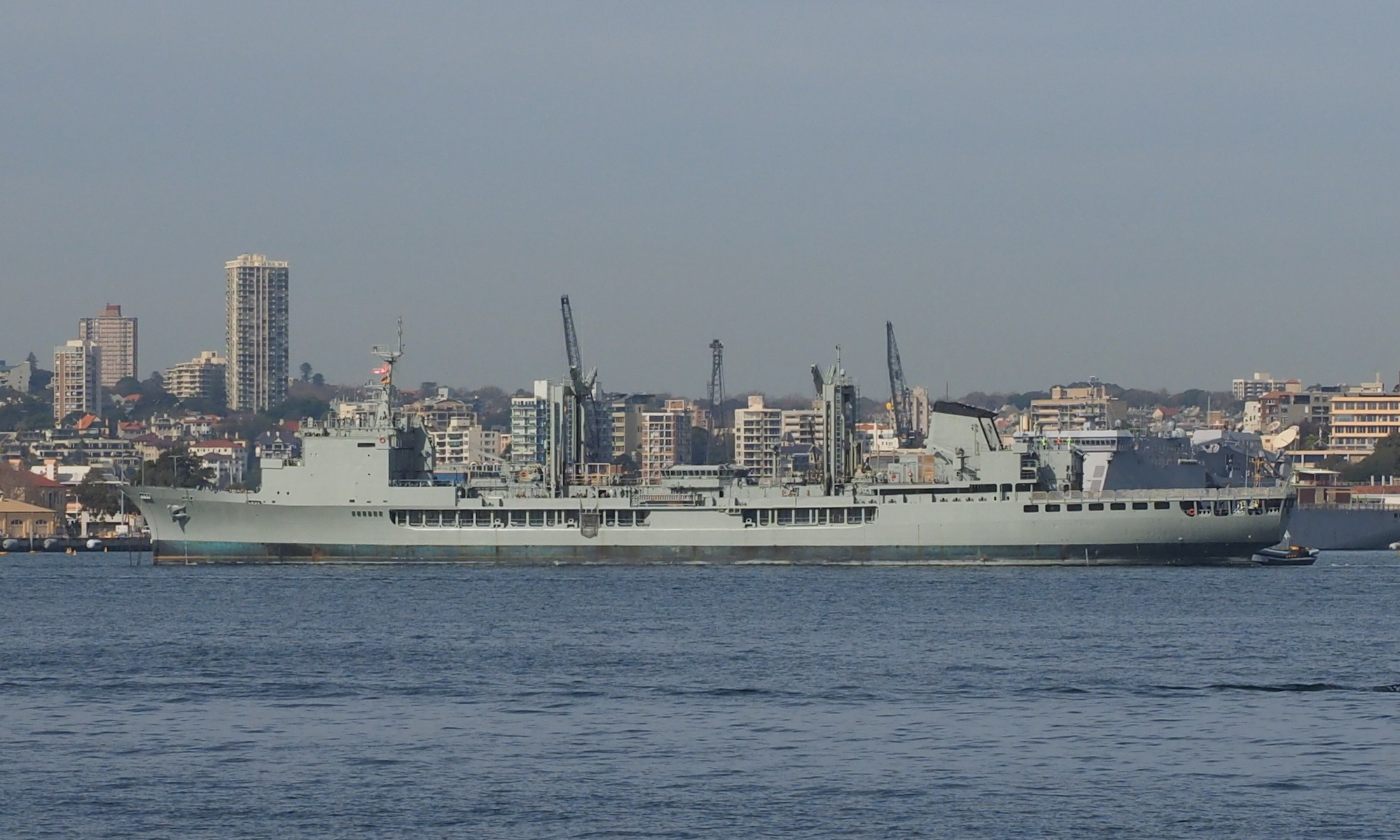
Success in Sydney during July 2019 after being decommissioned and having her hull number painted over

The Department of Defence predicted in 2006 that Success would reach the end of her useful operational lifespan sometime between 2015 and 2017. Following her double-hull refit, this was extended to the early 2020s, with the decision on the replacement vessel (acquisition project SEA 1654 Phase 3) to be made between 2016 and 2018, and the new ship in service by 2023. The 2013 Defence White Paper stated that the replacement of Success and HMAS Sirius would be brought forward. As well as building replacement vessels (either in Australia, overseas, or a combination), leasing existing vessels was also to be considered.

In June 2014, the Minister for Defence announced that two companies had been invited to a restricted tender competition. Navantia from Spain offered the Cantabria design, while Daewoo Shipbuilding & Marine Engineering from Korea proposed a downsized Aegir variant of the Tide-class tanker. The 20,000+ tonne ships will be built overseas, as they will be too large to build in Australian shipyards. In March 2016, the Navantia design was selected.

Success completed her final voyage into Sydney Harbour on 16 June 2019. She was decommissioned at Fleet Base East on 29 June 2019. Her replacement was HMAS Supply, a Supply-class replenishment oiler. This ship was commissioned in 2021.

Success arrived in Port Pirie in early August 2019. The ship was stripped to the hull by McMahon Services and the hull then moved to Whyalla on 27 April 2020, to a slipway that was once part of the former shipyards, where it was broken up for scrap.
