= Supply management =

Supply management can refer to:

- Supply management (procurement), the methods and processes of modern corporate or institutional buying
- Supply Management (magazine)
- Dairy and poultry supply management in Canada
