= HMAS Supply (A195) =

Supply-class replenishment oiler of Royal Australian Navy

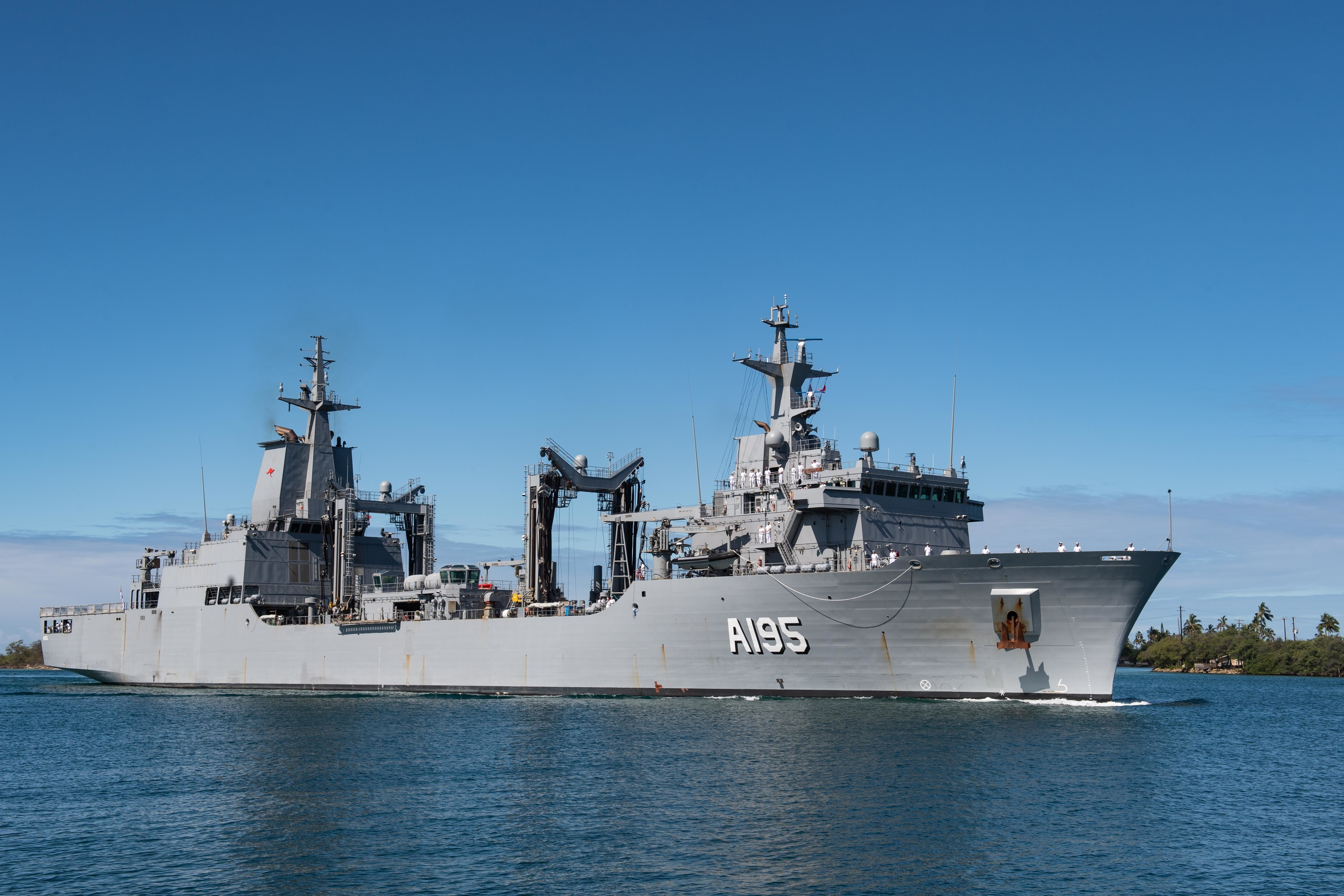
- HMAS Supply in June 2022

History

Australia
- Name: Supply
- Namesake: HMAS Supply
- Ordered: 10 March 2016
- Builder: Navantia
- Laid down: 18 November 2017
- Launched: 25 November 2018
- Commissioned: 10 April 2021
- Identification: IMO number: 9816921; MMSI number: 503172000; Callsign: VKCX
- Motto: Strengthen the Shield
- Nickname(s): Orca
- Status: Under repair (Note: The ship is currently under maintenance in Western Australia as was confirmed in a Senate estimates committee by the Chief of Navy on 6 June 2024.)
- Badge

General characteristics
- Class & type: Supply-class replenishment oiler
- Displacement: 19,500 t (19,200 long tons) full load
- Length: 173.9 m (570 ft 6 in)
- Beam: 23 m (75 ft 6 in) maximum
- Draught: 8 m (26 ft 3 in)
- Propulsion: 2 x MAN 18V 32/40 main engines; 4 x MAN 7L21/31 generator sets
- Speed: Over 20 knots (37 km/h; 23 mph)
- Range: Over 6,000 nmi (11,000 km; 6,900 mi) at 13 knots (24 km/h; 15 mph)
- Complement: 122
- Armament: 2x25mm Typhoon 1x20mm Phalanx ?x12.7mm Browning Heavy Machine Gun
- Aircraft carried: 2xMH60R

HMAS Supply (A195), named after the Royal Navy ship HMS Supply, is the lead ship of the Supply-class replenishment oilers built for the Royal Australian Navy by Navantia at their yard in Ferrol, Spain. The Australian Supply-class ships are based on the Spanish Navy's replenishment oiler Cantabria. The vessel was launched on 18 November 2017 and commissioned on 10 April 2021. It was confirmed in Senate estimates on 6 June 2024 that Supply was under repair in Western Australia, however the ship is currently based in NSW, as of November 2024.

== Design and construction ==
The Supply-class ships are intended to carry fuel, dry cargo, water, food, ammunition, equipment and spare parts to provide operational support for deployed Australian naval or combat forces operating away from the nation for long periods. In addition to replenishment, the vessels can be used to combat against environmental pollution at sea, provide logistics support for the armed forces, and to support humanitarian and disaster relief (HADR) operations following a natural disaster. The contract to build the two auxiliary oiler replenishment ships was awarded to Navantia in 2016.

Supply was laid down on 18 November 2017 and launched at the Navantia Shipyards in Ferrol, Spain on 24 November 2018. Supply is the second Royal Australian Navy (RAN) ship to bear the name after HMAS Supply (AO 195). On 2 October 2020, Supply arrived at Fleet Base West, Western Australia for final fit out and testing activities. Ship acceptance by the Department of Defence occurred on 8 January 2021.

== Operational history ==
Supply replaced HMAS Success which was decommissioned in June 2019. The ship arrived in Australia in early October 2020. While the ship's operational home port is Fleet Base East, its ceremonial home port is the Port of Eden.

The ship was commissioned on 10 April 2021 at Fleet Base East, Sydney. The commissioning ceremony quickly became the object of national controversy because of the RAN's decision to invite a local group of scantily-clad dancers to perform a routine that included twerking. An anonymous federal government frontbencher commented: "A question worth pondering: what would Horatio Nelson think of this shitshow?".

Supply was tasked with supporting the Australian Government effort led by the Department of Foreign Affairs and Trade to the Kingdom of Tonga in February 2022 alongside HMA Ships Adelaide and Canberra provide Australian Aid supplies and water to the country affected by the Hunga Tonga-Hunga Ha'apai eruption and tsunami.

Supply participated in Exercise RIMPAC 2022.

It was confirmed in a Senate estimates committee on 6 June 2024 that Supply is currently under repair in Western Australia.
