= Design 1037 ship =

Standard ship types of the US

Class overview
- Name: EFT Design 1037
- Built: 1918–1920
- Planned: 48
- Completed: 48

General characteristics
- Tonnage: 9,600 dwt
- Length: 395.5 ft 0 in (120.55 m)
- Beam: 55 ft 0 in (16.76 m)
- Draft: 35 ft 0 in (10.67 m)
- Installed power: oil fuel
- Propulsion: Turbines; *Triple expansion engine (Fuller)

The Design 1037 ship (full name Emergency Fleet Corporation Design 1037) was a steel-hulled cargo ship design approved for production by the United States Shipping Board's Emergency Fleet Corporation (EFT) in World War I. A total of 48 ships were ordered and completed from 1918 to 1920. The ships were constructed at three yards: Doullut & Williams Shipbuilding Company of New Orleans, Louisiana, Federal Shipbuilding Company of Kearney, New Jersey, and George A. Fuller & Company of Wilmington, North Carolina.

== Bibliography ==
- McKellar, Norman L. "Steel Shipbuilding under the U. S. Shipping Board, 1917-1921, Part IV, Contract Steel Ships" (PDF). Steel Shipbuilding under the U. S. Shipping Board, 1917-1921. ShipScribe.
