= Supply-class replenishment oiler =

Ships in the Royal Australian Navy

Supply class
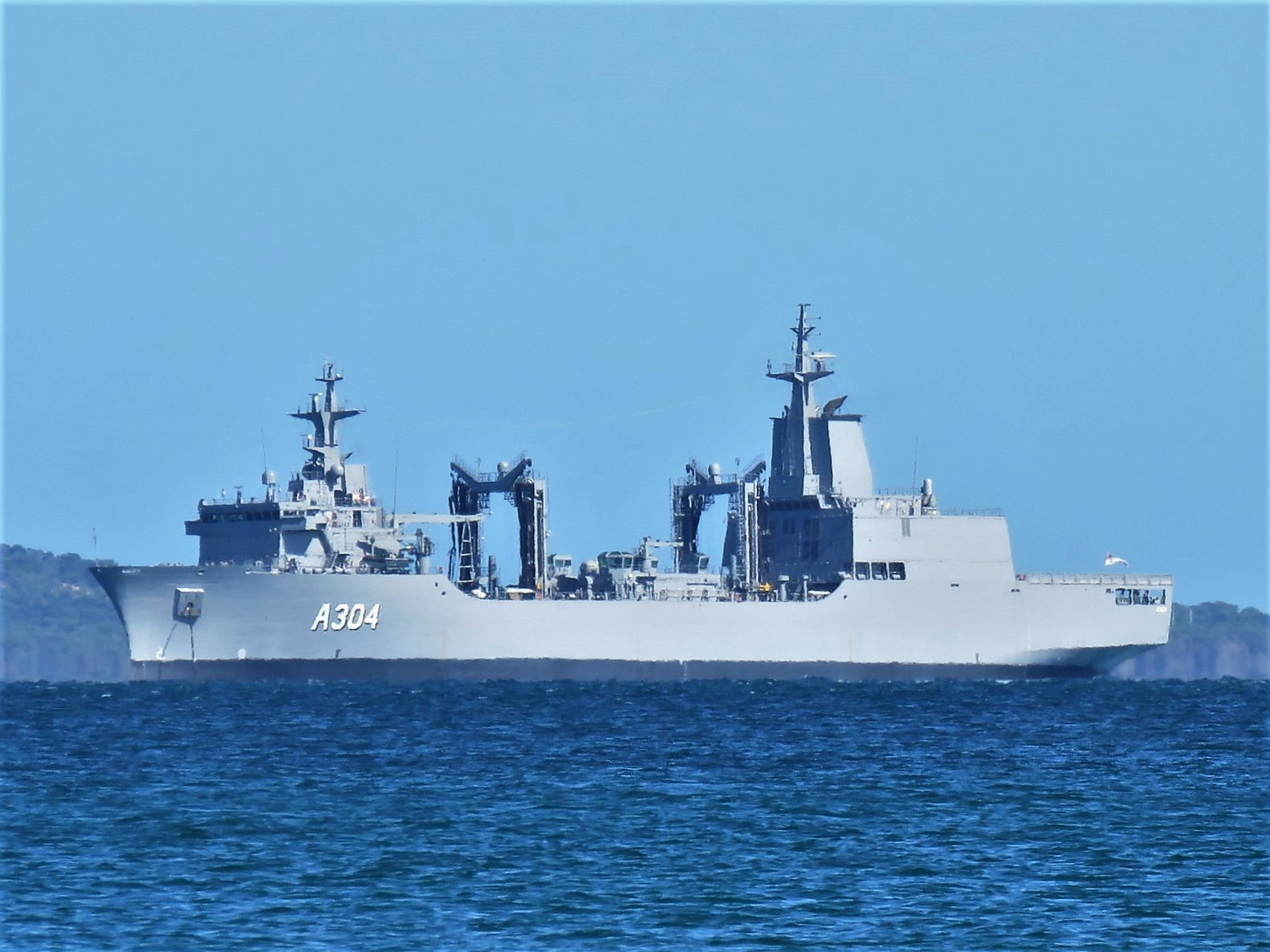
- Stalwart in Cockburn Sound, December 2021

Class overview
- Name: Supply class
- Builders: Navantia, Ferrol
- Operators: Royal Australian Navy
- Preceded by: HMAS Sirius, HMAS Success
- Cost: € 420 million (US$465 million) for two ships; € 210 million (US$232 million) per unit
- Built: 2018–present
- Planned: 2
- Completed: 2
- Active: 2

General characteristics
- Type: Replenishment oiler
- Displacement: 19,500 tonnes
- Length: 173.9 m (570 ft 6 in)
- Beam: 23.0 m (75 ft 6 in)
- Draught: 8.0 m (26 ft 3 in)
- Propulsion: 2 × MAN 18V 32/40 main engines; 4 × MAN 7L21/31 generator sets
- Speed: 20 knots (37 km/h; 23 mph)
- Range: 6,000 nmi (11,000 km; 6,900 mi) at 13 knots (24 km/h; 15 mph)
- Boats & landing craft carried: 2 x 7.2m RHIBs
- Complement: 122
- Sensors & processing systems: Saab NG 9LV Situational Awarness System
- Armament: 1 × 20mm Phalanx CIWS; 2 × 25mm Typhoon Weapon Stations; 4 × 12.7mm heavy machine guns
- Aircraft carried: 1 helicopter

The Supply class is a class of replenishment oilers of the Royal Australian Navy, a role that combines the missions of a tanker and stores supply ship. As such they are designated auxiliary oiler replenisher (AOR). They are tasked with providing ammunition, fuel, food and other supplies to Royal Australian Navy vessels around the world. There are two ships in the class, Supply and Stalwart. The project is expected to cost anywhere between $1 and $2 billion. Navantia were selected to build a design based on the Spanish Navy's current replenishment vessel Cantabria, which entered service in 2011.

== Planning ==
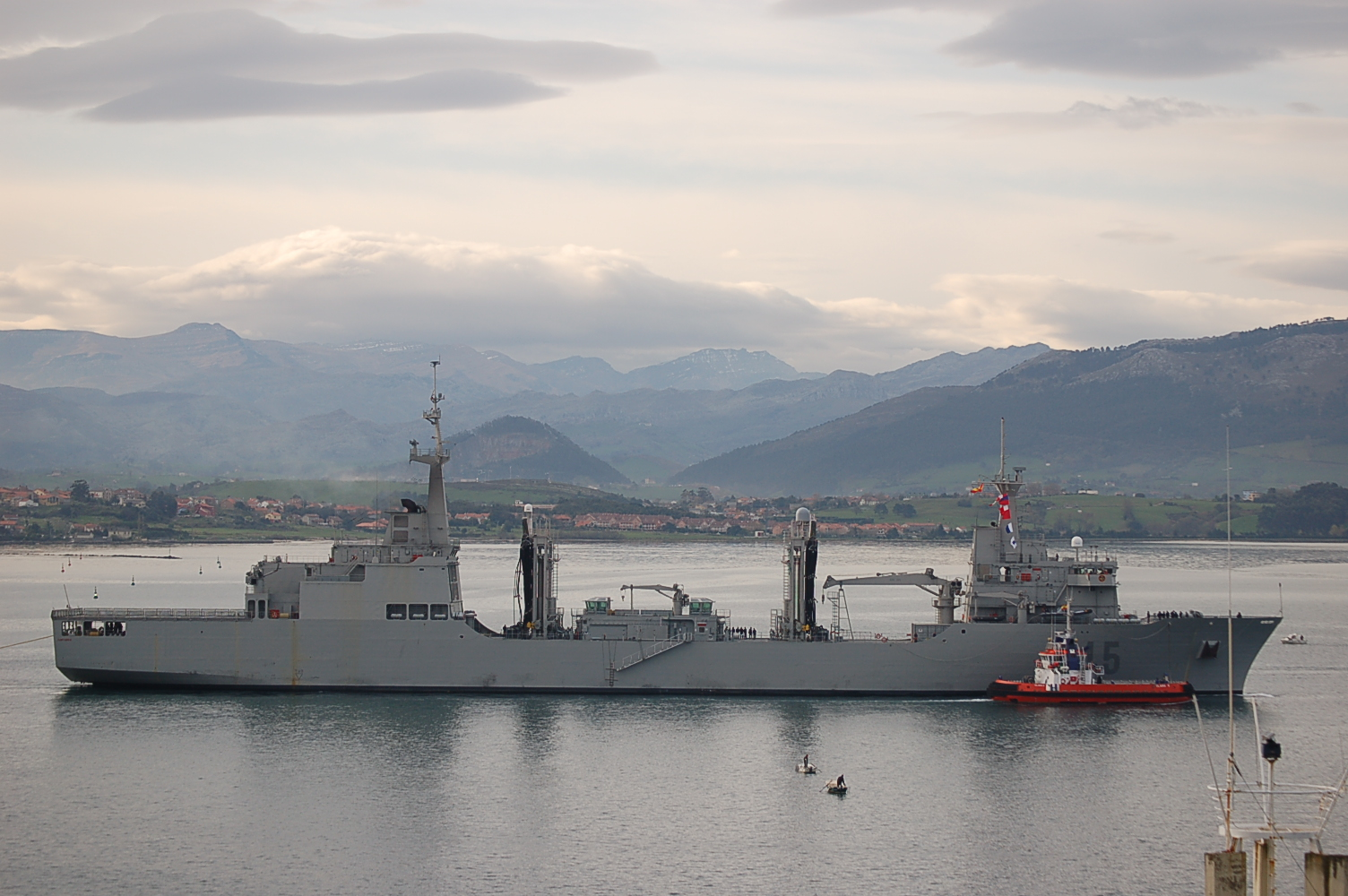
HMAS Supply and Stalwart are based on the Spanish oiler Cantabria shown here in March 2011.

A number of designs were considered by the Australian Government for their replacement tankers, with Navantia competing against the Aegir variant of the Tide-class tanker built by South Korea's DSME in a restricted tender competition. Navantia's proposal based on Cantabria was announced as the successful design in the Australian tender in March 2016, with an expected in service date for the first of two vessels of late 2019.

== Construction ==
The class of ships based on Navantia's replenishment oiler were built at the Navantia shipyard in Ferrol, Spain. The first ship, Supply, arrived at Fleet Base West in October 2020 to begin fitting Australia-specific equipment prior to her service entry in April 2021.

The second ship, Stalwart, departed for Australia in May 2021 and arrived in late June.

== Operational history ==
HMAS Supply commissioned at Fleet Base East on 10 April 2021.

HMAS Stalwart commissioned at Fleet Base West on 13 November 2021.

=== Mechanical defects ===
In March 2023, a mechanical defect relating to the shaft alignment was found on HMAS Supply. The ship returned to Garden Island where it was to be repaired by Navantia under warranty.

In June 2024, it was reported that HMAS Supply could remain out of service for another year despite being sidelined for repairs over 14 months previously. In the same month, it was reported that HMAS Stalwart had been sidelined due to mechanical problems relating to its engine. As a result, the Royal Australian Navy had no operational replenishment oilers during 2024 with the vessels remaining out of service until late 2025 when Stalwart resumed operations after repairs were completed.

== Ships ==
Name	Pennant number	Builder	Laid down	Launched	Commissioned	Status
Supply	A195	Navantia, Ferrol	18 November 2017	24 November 2018	10 April 2021	Active
Stalwart	A304	Navantia, Ferrol	25 November 2018	30 August 2019	13 November 2021	Active

== Gallery ==
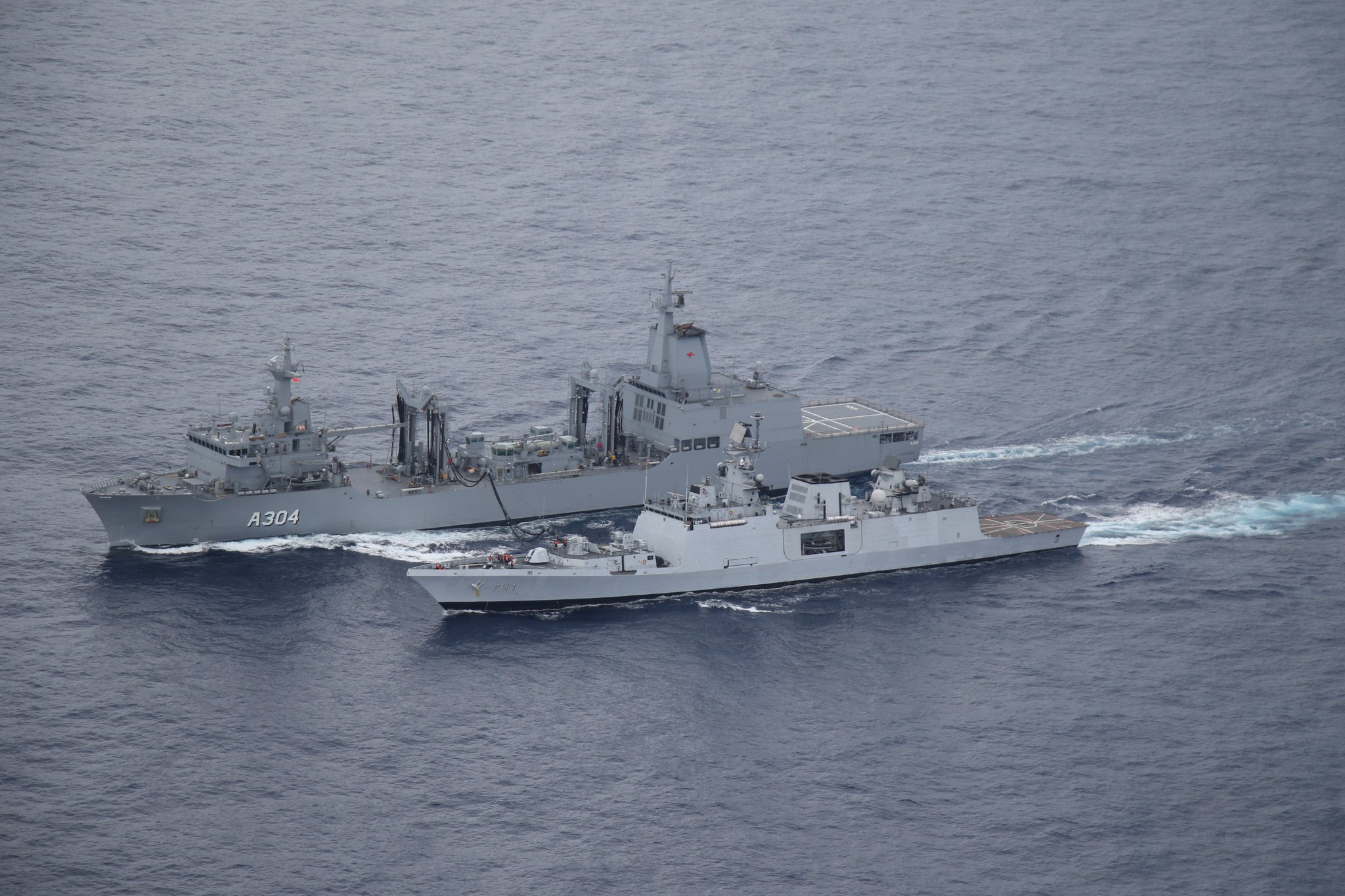
INS Shivalik undergoing replenishment from Stalwart during a Malabar exercise.
