= HMS Supply =

Nine ships of the Royal Navy have been named HMS Supply.

- HMS Supply (1672) was a 6-gun fireship purchased in 1672 and expended in 1673.
- HMS Supply (1688) was a 9-gun fireship purchased in 1688. Her fate is unknown.
- HMS Supply (1725) was a 4-gun hoy launched in 1725 and captured in 1752
- HMAT Supply (1759) was a 4-gun armed tender launched in 1759 and sold in 1792; she played an important part in the foundation of Australia.
- HMS Supply (1777) was a 26-gun storeship, originally in civilian service as the Prince of Wales. She was purchased in 1777 and destroyed in accidental fire in 1779.
- HMS Supply (1781) was a 20-gun storeship purchased in 1781 and sold in 1784.
- HMS Supply (1793) was a 10-gun storeship, of 388 tons (bm), originally the American mercantile New Brunswick, which the Admiralty purchased in 1793 as an armed vessel for the colony at Botany Bay; she was broken up there in 1806.
- HMS Supply (1798) was a transport launched in 1798 and broken up in 1834.
- HMS Supply (1854) was an iron-screw storeship purchased whilst under construction in 1854. She had been broken up by 1879.
