= Spanish oiler Cantabria =

Rplenishment oiler operated by the Spanish Navy

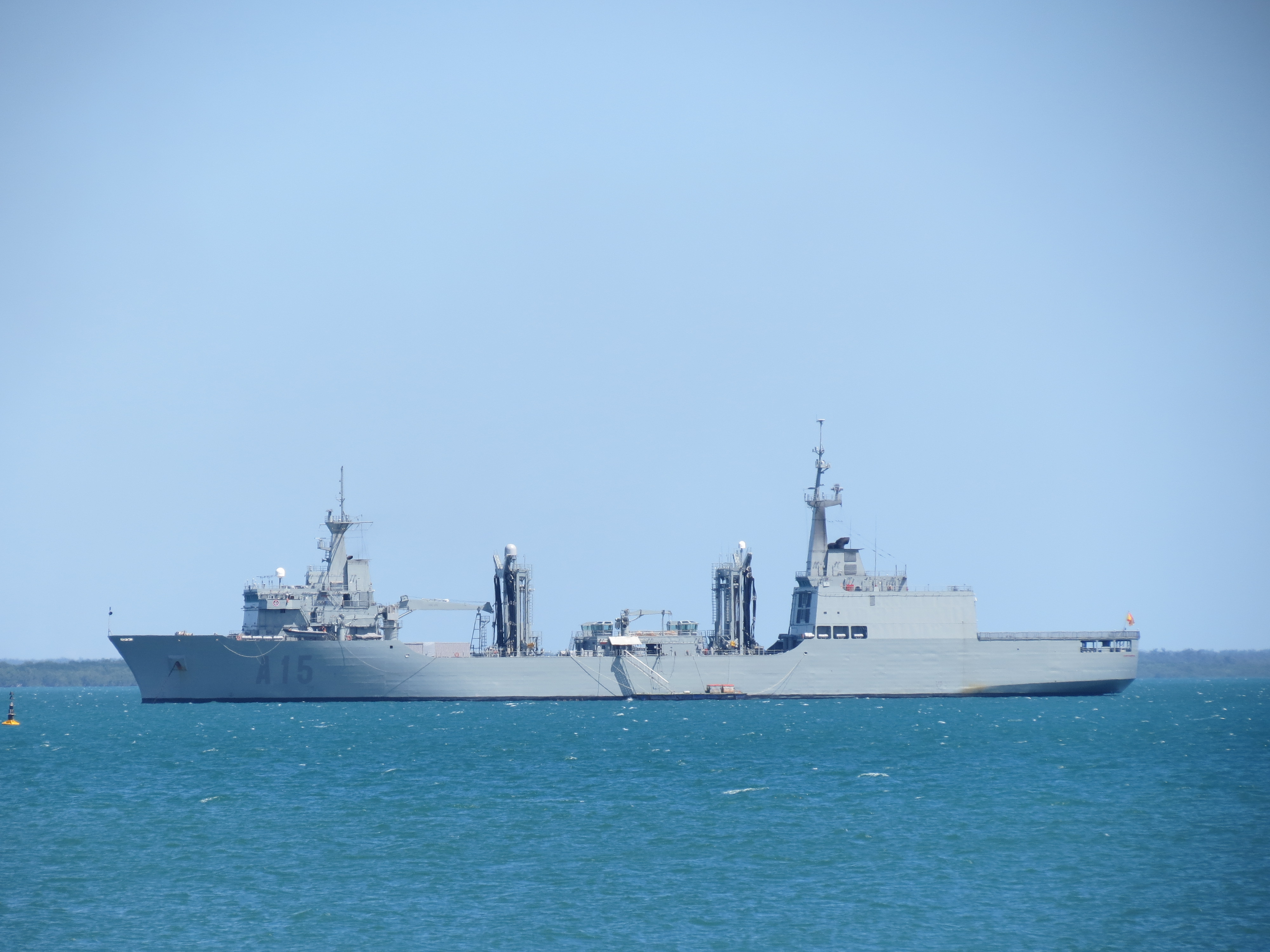
- Cantabria in May 2013

History

Spain
- Name: Cantabria
- Ordered: July 2005
- Builder: Puerto Real, Cadiz
- Cost: €238 million
- Laid down: 18 July 2007
- Launched: 21 July 2008
- Commissioned: 29 September 2010
- Identification: IMO number: 9517604; MMSI number: 225383000; Callsign: EBAS; Pennant number: A15
- Status: in active service
- Badge

General characteristics
- Type: Replenishment oiler
- Displacement: 19,500 tons
- Length: 174.0 m (570.9 ft)
- Beam: 23 m (75 ft)
- Draught: 8 m (26 ft)
- Propulsion: 2 diesel MAN 18V 40/45, 10,890 kW (14,600 hp), single propeller shaft, controllable-pitch propeller
- Speed: 20 knots (37 km/h; 23 mph) sustained
- Range: 6,000 nmi (11,000 km; 6,900 mi)
- Capacity: 8,920 m^{3} (315,000 cu ft) of ship fuel; 1,585 m^{3} (56,000 cu ft) of JP-5; 215 m^{3} (7,600 cu ft) of fresh water; 280 tons of ammunition; 470 tons of general cargo
- Complement: 122
- Sensors & processing systems: EID ICCS integrated communications control system
- Aircraft carried: 2 (Sikorsky SH-3 Sea King or NHIndustries NH90) –3 (Agusta-Bell AB.212) helicopters
- Aviation facilities: hangar and flight deck

Cantabria (A15) is a replenishment oiler operated by the Spanish Navy. Acquired to provide logistical support for the Spanish fleet, Cantabria was commissioned in 2010. Cantabria is the second-largest naval ship currently operated by the Spanish, behind Juan Carlos I.

== Design and construction ==
Cantabria is a replenishment oiler, referred to in Spanish as a Buque de Aprovisionamiento en Combate (BAC; Supply Ship in Combat). She was acquired to provide logistical support to the Spanish Navy during day-to-day operations, expeditionary forces or strategic projection deployments, and for humanitarian and disaster relief operations. The vessel has a displacement of 19,500 tons, is 170.4 metres (559 ft) in length, has a beam of 23 metres (75 ft), and a draught of 8 metres (26 ft). Propulsion is provided by two diesel engines, supplying 10,890 kilowatts (14,600 hp) to a single propeller shaft, which is fitted with a controllable-pitch propeller. Cantabria has a maximum sustained speed of 20 knots (37 km/h; 23 mph), and a range of 6,000 nautical miles (11,000 km; 6,900 mi). The ship's complement is 122.

The ship's capacity includes 8,920 cubic metres (315,000 cu ft) of ship fuel, 1,585 cubic metres (56,000 cu ft) of JP-5 jet fuel, 215 cubic metres (7,600 cu ft) of fresh water, 280 tons of ammunition, and 470 tons of general cargo. The fuel storage areas are double-hulled. Cantabria can replenish three ships simultaneously; one on each side, plus a third via a stern refueling station. She can carry three Agusta-Bell AB.212, two Sikorsky SH-3 Sea King, or two NHIndustries NH90 helicopters to perform vertical replenishment.

Cantabria was laid down in the dry dock of shipyard of Puerto Real, Cadiz, on 18 July 2007; the first ship to be built there in 30 years. The ship was launched by floating on 21 July 2008, and was sponsored by Aurora Diaz Abella, the wife of Miguel Ángel Revilla, the President of the Autonomous Community of Cantabria. The ship underwent sea trials in the Bay of Cadiz from October to December 2009. She was commissioned into the Spanish Navy on 29 September 2010. The original budget was €213m but the final cost was €238m.

== Export ==
The design has been evaluated by foreign buyers. Canada approached Navantia to provide a design for the Joint Support Ship Project based on Cantabria, but Navantia's proposal was not successful, with Canada eventually selecting an alternative German design based on the Berlin class. The Norwegian Navy has also expressed interest, but they have announced an order for a replenishment ship from South Korean shipbuilder DSME.

Australia considered the design for their replacement tankers, with Navantia competing against the Aegir variant of the Tide-class tanker built by South Korea's DSME in a restricted tender competition. Navantia's proposal based on Cantabria was announced as the successful design in the Australian tender in March 2016, with an expected in service date for the first of two vessels to be known as HMA Ships Supply and Stalwart of late 2019. The two vessels will be known within the Royal Australian Navy as the Supply class.

== Operational history ==
Between 2 and 5 July 2012, Cantabria participated alongside the frigates Álvaro de Bazán, Almirante Juan de Borbón, and Méndez Núñez, the submarine Galerna, and AV-8Bs of the 9th naval air squadron during exercise MAR-22 on the Atlantic coast of Galicia.

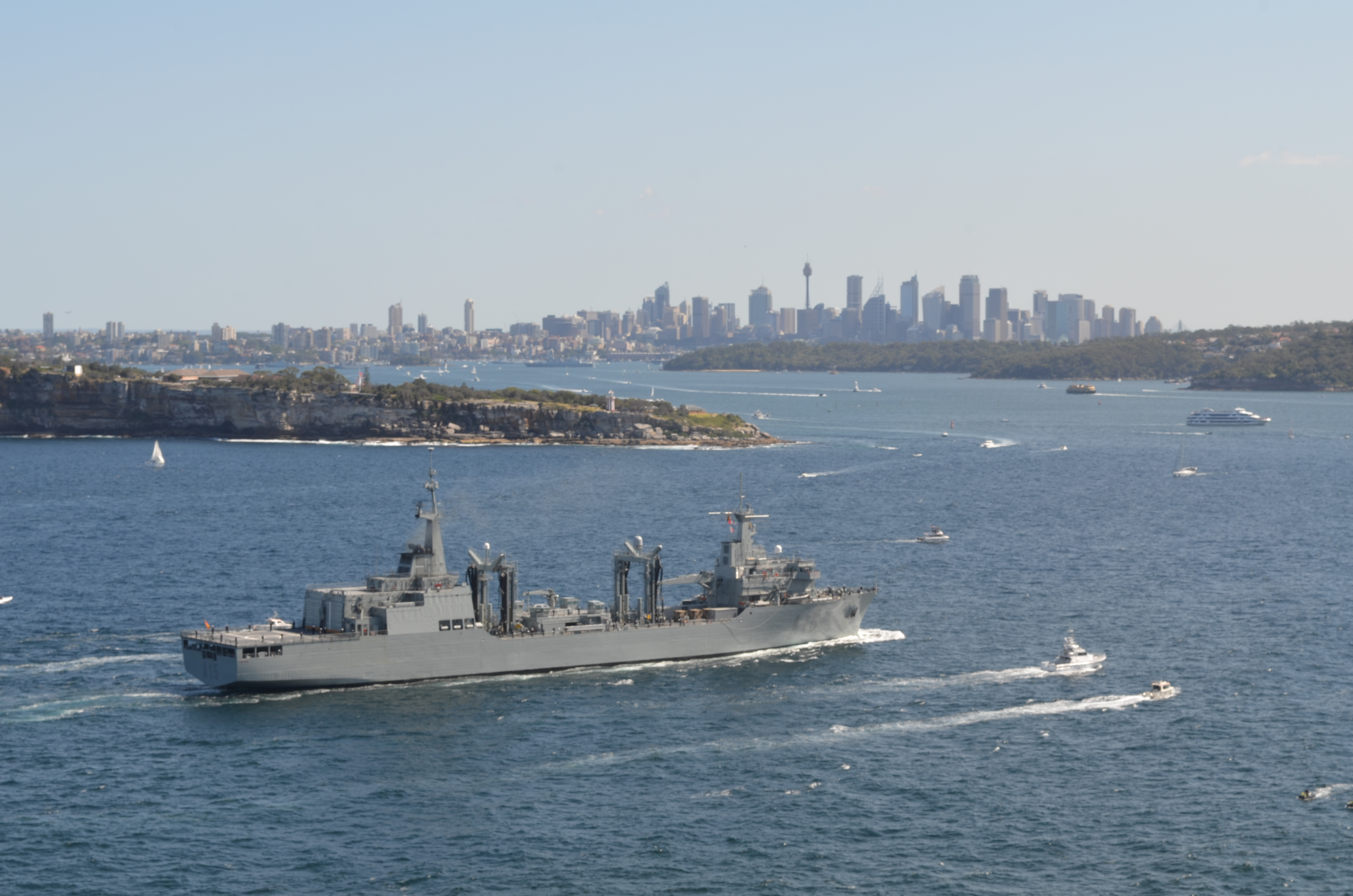
Cantabria entering Sydney Harbour in October 2013

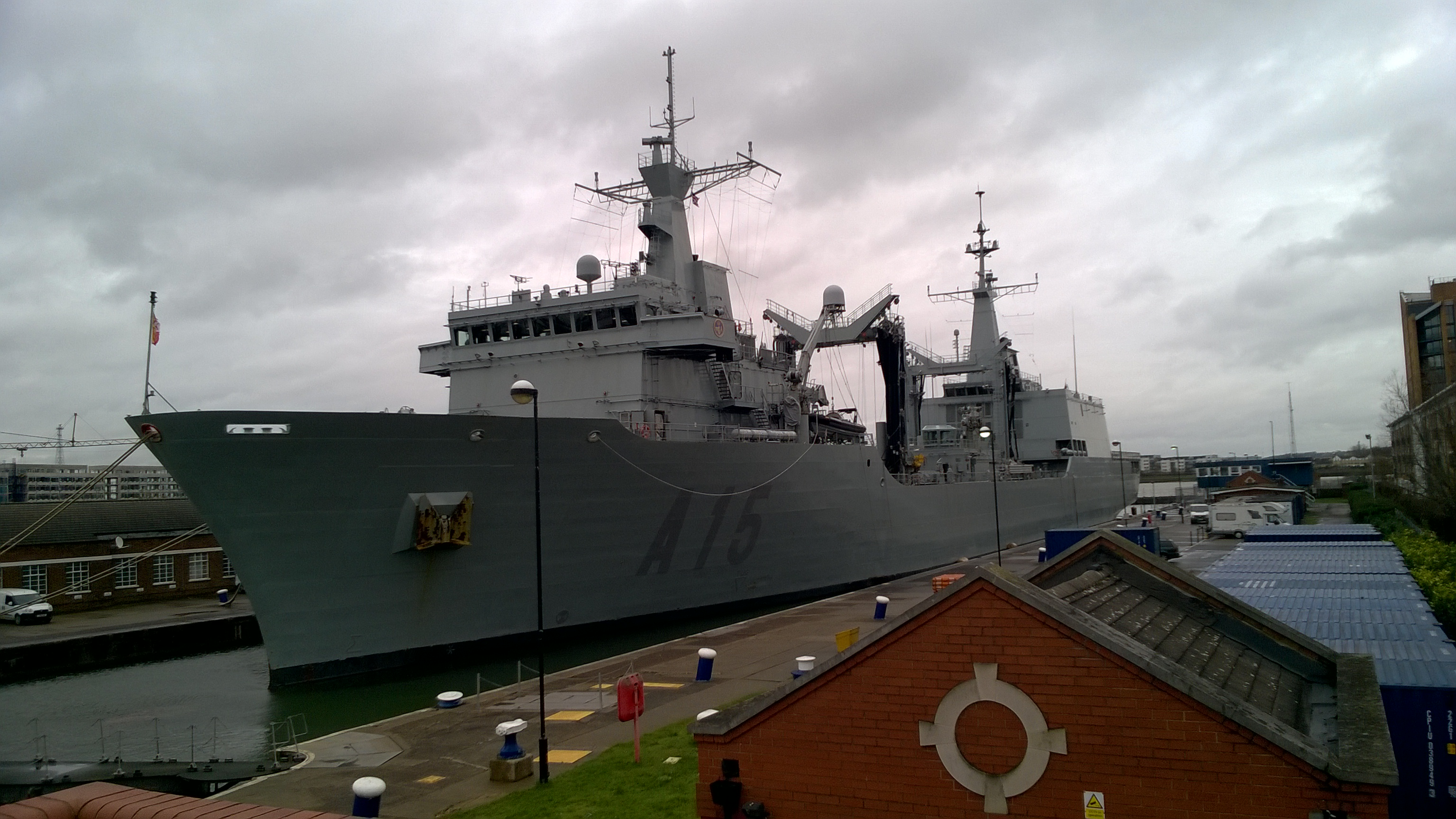
Cantabria moored at Gallions Basin in London in January 2016

On 3 July 2012, the Australian and Spanish governments signed an agreement to deploy Cantabria in support of the Royal Australian Navy during 2013. The ship operated in Australian waters from February to November 2013, was used to provide replenishment support to the Australians while the oiler HMAS Success underwent maintenance. While in Australian waters, Cantabria performed 63 replenishments, including 10,500 cubic metres (370,000 cu ft) of fuel, was involved in the first vertical replenishment of an Anzac-class frigate by an MRH-90 helicopter, and participated in the International Fleet Review 2013. The deployment also allowed over 300 Australian personnel to train on systems similar to those in the Spanish-designed Hobart and Canberra-class ships being acquired, and allowed the Royal Australian Navy to evaluate the design as a possible replacement for its replenishment vessels.

In 2015 the Canadian and Spanish governments concluded a deal where Patiño and Cantabria would deploy with Canadian naval forces as their replenishment vessel in 2016. This would be done primarily for training missions. Cantabria would be made available to the Royal Canadian Navy from mid-September to November 2016.
