= USS Goldsborough (DDG-20) =

Charles F. Adams–class destroyer

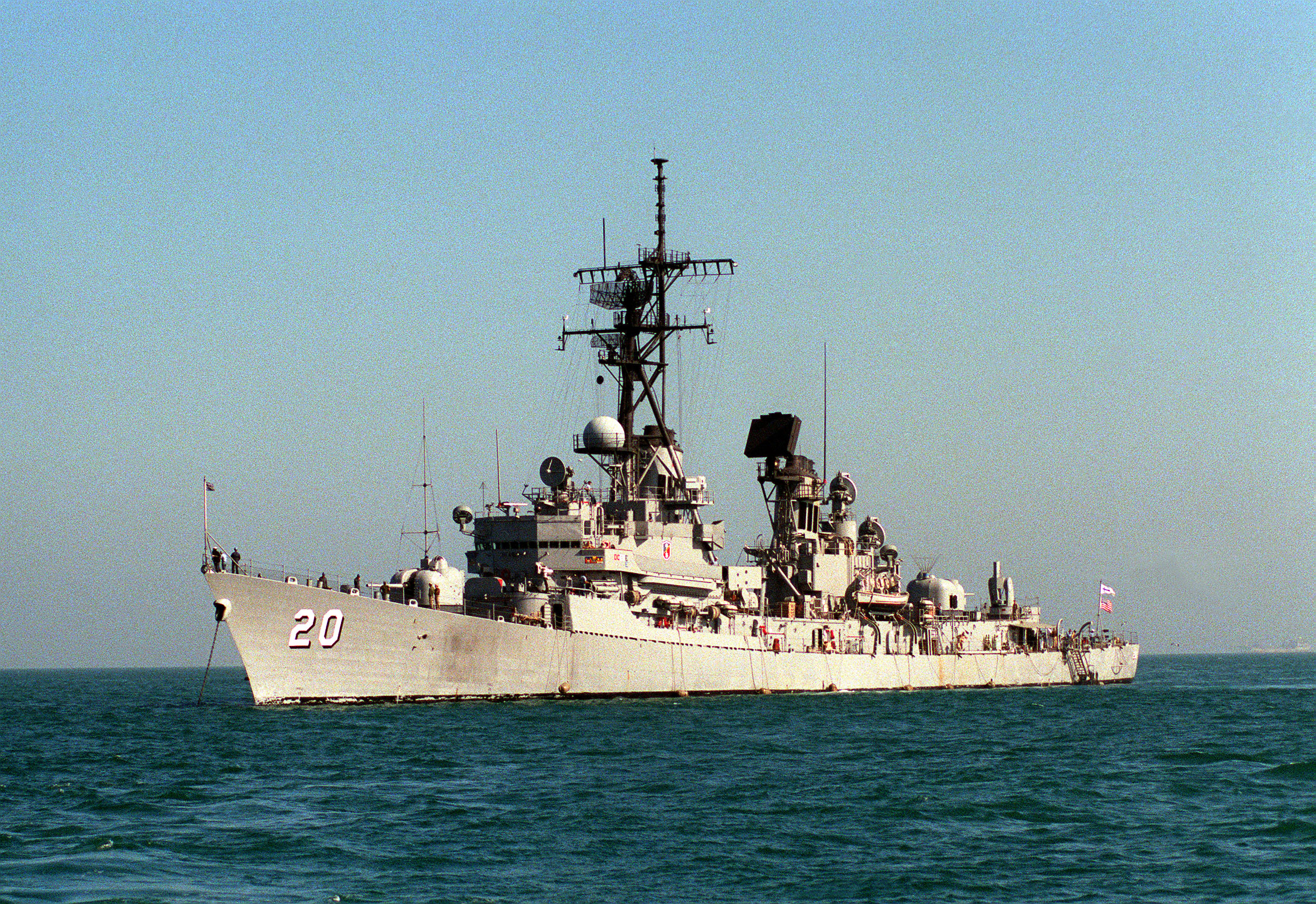
- USS Goldsborough off Bahrain in 1986

History

United States
- Name: Goldsborough
- Namesake: Louis M. Goldsborough
- Ordered: 25 March 1960
- Builder: Puget Sound Bridge and Drydock Company
- Laid down: 3 January 1961
- Launched: 15 December 1961
- Commissioned: 9 November 1963
- Decommissioned: 29 April 1993
- Stricken: 29 April 1993
- Identification: Callsign: NOZX; Hull number: DDG-20
- Motto: Non Sibi; (Not for self)
- Fate: Sold to Australia for parts and scrapped

General characteristics
- Class & type: Charles F. Adams-class destroyer
- Displacement: 3,277 long tons (3,330 t) standard; 4,526 long tons (4,599 t) full load
- Length: 437 ft (133 m)
- Beam: 47 ft (14 m)
- Draft: 15 ft (4.6 m)
- Propulsion: 2 × General Electric steam turbines providing 70,000 shp (52 MW); 2 shafts; 4 × Babcock & Wilcox 1,275 psi (8,790 kPa) boilers
- Speed: 33 knots (61 km/h; 38 mph)
- Range: 4,500 nautical miles (8,300 km) at 20 knots (37 km/h)
- Complement: 354 (24 officers, 330 enlisted)
- Sensors & processing systems: AN/SPS-39 3D air search radar; AN/SPS-10 surface search radar; AN/SPG-51 missile fire control radar; AN/SPG-53 gunfire control radar; AN/SQS-23 Bow Mounted Sonar; AN/SPS-40 Air Search Radar
- Armament: 1 Mk 13 single arm missile launcher for RIM-24 Tartar SAM or later the RIM-66 Standard (SM-1) and Harpoon antiship missile; 2 × 5"/54 caliber Mark 42 (127 mm) gun; 1 × RUR-5 ASROC Launcher; 6 × 12.8 in (324 mm) ASW Torpedo Tubes (2 × Mark 32 Surface Vessel Torpedo Tubes)

USS Goldsborough (DDG-20) was a Charles F. Adams–class guided missile-armed destroyer. It was named for Rear Admiral Louis M. Goldsborough USN (1805–1877).

== Ship history ==
=== Construction ===
Goldsborough was laid down by the Puget Sound Bridge and Drydock Company at Seattle in Washington on 3 January 1961, was launched on 15 December 1961 by Mrs. Alan Bible, wife of U.S. Senator Alan Bible of Nevada, and commissioned on 9 November 1963, Captain Charles D. Allen, Jr., in command.

=== 1960s and 70s ===
Goldsborough joined the Pacific Fleet on 25 December 1963, as a unit of Cruiser-Destroyer Force with her home port at Pearl Harbor, Hawaii.

After her shakedown tests out of Puget Sound, the new guided missile destroyer arrived at Pearl Harbor on 14 February 1964. Following qualification and acceptance tests, she sailed on 18 April for Sydney, Australia, for the Coral Sea celebration and returned to Pearl Harbor on 1 June. She operated in Hawaiian waters in the summer and early fall, and went underway on 23 November for Yokosuka and her first West Pacific deployment. After operations strengthening the 7th Fleet during the escalating war in Vietnam, Goldsborough returned to Pearl Harbor for anti-submarine warfare training. In June 1965, she was outfitted with a capsule retrieval device and participated in the Gemini IV Space Program as back up Pacific recovery ship.

The guided missile destroyer headed for the Orient once more on 9 February 1966 to bolster the 7th Fleet. In April she provided gunfire support for Operation "Binh Phu I firing about 600 rounds of 5-inch ammunition at Viet Cong troop concentrations and buildings. During the last half of the month she screened attack carriers at Yankee Station. Next came SEATO exercises in May and duty as station ship at Hong Kong in June. On 26 June Goldsborough was again off Vietnam on picket station. She sailed for Hawaii on 16 July and reached Pearl Harbor on the 23d.

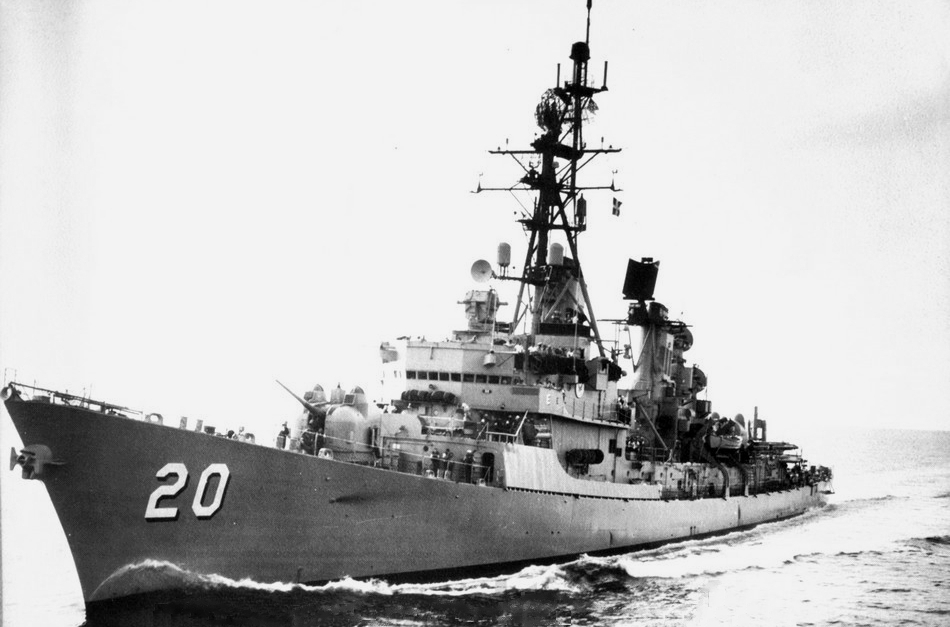
Goldsborough in 1966

While in berth at Pearl Harbor on 24 November 1965, an anti-submarine torpedo was discharged from the ship accidentally and hit the pier.

In August 1966, Goldsborough entered the Pearl Harbor Naval Shipyard for overhaul and extensive modification. In 1967 she participated in "Operation Sea Dragon", designed to interdict the North Vietnamese lines of supply into the Republic of Vietnam, and provided Naval Gunfire Support along the Vietnamese DMZ. During this deployment Goldsborough fired nearly 10,000 rounds in support of allied forces and avoided over 800 rounds of hostile fire without damage to the ship. She was awarded the Naval Unit Commendation for exceptionally meritorious service in Vietnamese waters from 29 August 1967 to 17 February 1968 upon her return to Pearl Harbor.

In November 1968 Goldsborough made her fourth Western Pacific deployment in five years, participating in eighty-eight gunfire missions in support of Vietnam, Republic of Korea, and U. S. Marine and Army forces.

In 1969 Goldsborough participated in the Apollo 11 Recovery Mission. The command module Columbia splashed down about 200 nautical miles south of Johnston Island at 12:50 GMT 24 July 1969.

After a yard period in 1970, Goldsborough made a fifth West-Pac tour, departing Pearl in August and returning in February 1971. Again she provided Naval Gunfire Support for allied troops, and carried out carrier escort duties in the Gulf of Tonkin. Later that year she visited Portland, Oregon, for the 1971 Rose Festival.

In September 1971 Goldsborough departed on her sixth deployment to the Western Pacific, providing Naval Gunfire Support for allied ground troops and performing carrier escort services.

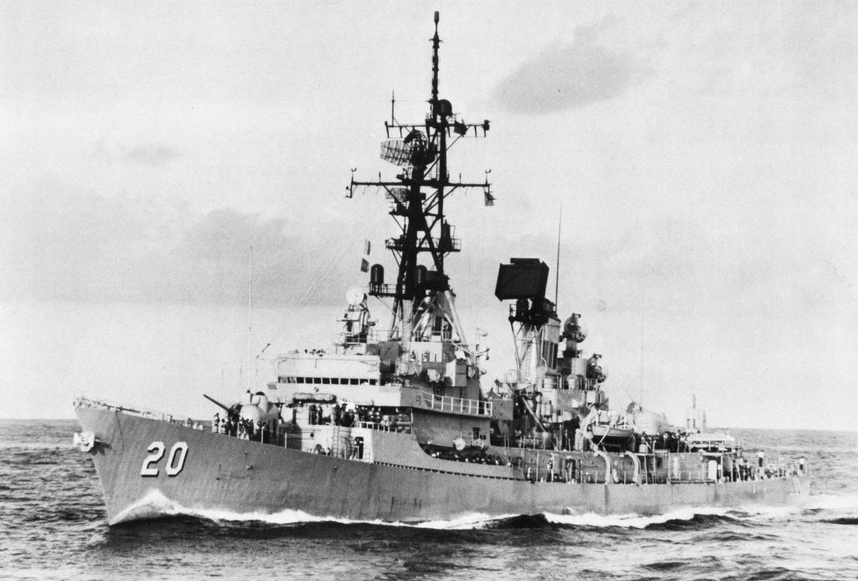
Goldsborough underway in 1977

In early 1972 she was assigned to the recovery Task Force for Apollo 16. Departing again on 13 October 1972 for her seventh deployment to the Western Pacific, this would be her last trip to the "gunline" of Vietnam. On 19 December, while conducting a combat mission Goldsborough was hit by coastal artillery fire. The shore battery put a hole five feet wide through an upper deck, killing three sailors and wounding several others. The ship's crew received a Meritorious Unit Commendation for service between October 1972 and February 1973. The ship returned to Pearl Harbor in May 1973.

In mid-1976 after leaving port in Singapore, and conducting Shellback initiations, the Goldsborough was ordered to the Indian Ocean with the Ranger Task Force in response to the Operation Entebbe. She was low on supplies during the initial days in the Indian Ocean, but supply ships soon caught up with the group. The Ranger Task force remained on station for approximately 30 days showing the flag.

=== 1980s ===
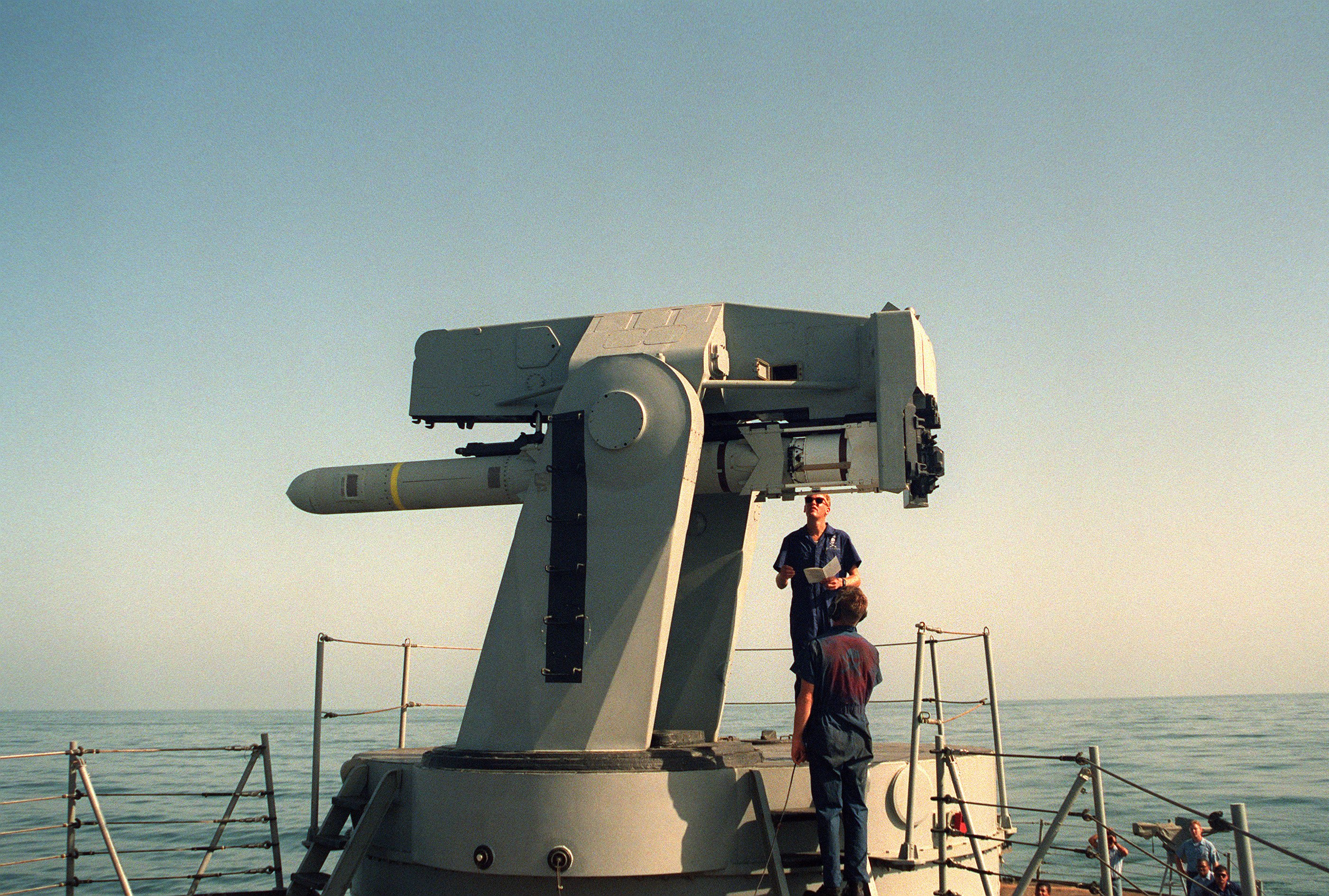
RGM-84 Harpoon on Goldsborough on 1 October 1990

In November 1982, a seaman was killed when heavy seas tossed him against a stanchion. He was the only fatality when Hurricane Iwa struck Hawaii.

From 1983 to 1984 the ship entered Pearl Harbor Naval Ship Yard for 15-month Complex Overhaul (COH), which included over 9 months in Dry Dock. The main purpose of the COH was to install the DDG-15 Mod upgrades to the ships Combat Systems and the many support systems for it. One example was installation of large 100 ton Air Conditioning System to replace the many 1 ton package A/C units throughout the ship. Also, the Commodores Cabin was re-configured into a Computer Room. Many major repairs were made to the ships engineering propulsion plant and auxiliary systems, which significantly improved the reliability of the ships underway operations. Notably the ship rarely had to resort to "Water Hours" or the rationing of potable water after the COH, which was routine before the COH.

In 1988 the Goldsborough deployed with a battlegroup centered around the aircraft carrier Carl Vinson, CVN-70. The battlegroup supported Operation Earnest Will, conducting missions in and around the Straits of Hormuz and the Persian Gulf. Goldsborough had received the New Threat Upgrade (NTU), giving her advanced sensor and communications capabilities. As such the ship frequently was assigned to the Straits of Hormuz, Eastern Patrol Area (SOHEPA) to monitor air activity inside Iranian borders. At the end of the deployment, Goldsborough made port visits to Pattaya Beach, Thailand, Hong Kong, and Subic Bay in the Philippines.Goldsborough suffered minor damage while passing through Typhoon Roy en route to Hong Kong.

=== Decommissioning ===
Goldsborough was decommissioned and stricken from the Naval Vessel Register on 29 April 1993, the last of the American Adams Class guided missile destroyers to be decommissioned. The ship was sold to Australia on 17 September 1993 for US$2,337,462. The Royal Australian Navy intended to remove equipment from the ship to establish training facilities for maintenance personnel from their Perth-class destroyers (derivatives of the Charles F. Adams-class). At the time, most training was conducted in the United States; as such it was expensive to continually fly sailors between the United States and Australia, and with the Charles F. Adams class phasing out of service, was likely to be terminated anyway. Goldsborough would also be used as a source of spare parts for the Perth class.

The ship was towed from Hawaii to Australia at a cost of A$559,706, and arrived in Sydney on 2 February 1994, then was berthed at Fleet Base East. A four-man team set about removing equipment for installation at the new training facility, and for the Australian destroyers. While in Australian hands, the team painted the number 40 on the bow, filling a gap in the pennant number sequence for their three destroyers. After all usable equipment had been stripped, Goldsborough was sold to an Indian company in August 1994 for ship breaking.
