= HMAS Brisbane (D 41) =

Australian guided missile destroyer

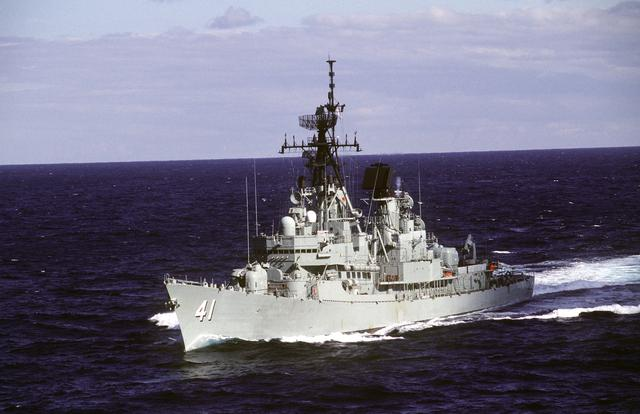
- HMAS Brisbane in 1995

History

Australia
- Namesake: City of Brisbane
- Builder: Defoe Shipbuilding Company
- Laid down: 15 February 1965
- Launched: 5 May 1966
- Commissioned: 16 December 1967
- Decommissioned: 19 October 2001
- Motto: "We Aim At Higher Things"
- Nickname(s): Steel Cat; Fighting Forty-One
- Honours and awards: Battle honours: Vietnam 1969–71; Kuwait 1990–91; plus one inherited honour; Awards: Meritorious Unit Citation
- Fate: Sunk as dive wreck
- Badge

General characteristics
- Class & type: Perth-class guided missile destroyer
- Displacement: 3,370 tons standard; 4,551 tons full load
- Length: 437 ft (133 m) length overall; 420 ft (130 m) between perpendiculars
- Beam: 47 ft 1 in (14.35 m)
- Draught: 15 ft 3 in (4.65 m) maximum
- Propulsion: 2 × General Electric steam turbines, 70,000 shp (52,000 kW), 2 shafts
- Speed: 35 knots (65 km/h; 40 mph)
- Range: 6,000 nautical miles (11,000 km; 6,900 mi) at 15 knots (28 km/h; 17 mph)
- Complement: 24 officers, 312 sailors
- Armament: 1 × Mk 13 launcher for Tartar, then Standard missiles; 2 × 5"/54 calibre Mark 42 guns; 2 × Mark 32 triple torpedo tube sets; 2 × Ikara anti-submarine missile launchers (removed 1991); 2 × Phalanx CIWS (installed 1990)

HMAS Brisbane (D 41) was one of three Perth-class guided missile destroyers to serve in the Royal Australian Navy (RAN). The United States-designed ship was laid down at Bay City, Michigan in 1965, launched in 1966 and commissioned into the RAN in 1967. She is named after the city of Brisbane, Queensland.

During her career, Brisbane made two deployments to the Vietnam War, was involved in the post-Cyclone Tracy disaster relief operation Navy Help Darwin, and deployed to the Persian Gulf during the first Gulf War. Brisbane was decommissioned in 2001, and was sunk as a dive wreck off the Queensland coast in 2005.

== Design and construction ==
Brisbane was one of three Perth-class guided missile destroyers built for the RAN. Based on the United States Navy's Charles F. Adams class, Brisbane had a displacement of 3,370 tons at standard load, and 4,551 tons at full load, a length of 437 feet (133 m) overall and 420 feet (130 m) between perpendiculars, a beam of 47 feet 1 inch (14.35 m), and a maximum draught of 15 feet 3 inches (4.65 m). Propulsion was provided by two General Electric turbines, which provided 70,000 shaft horsepower (52,000 kW) to the destroyer's two propeller shafts. Brisbane could achieve speeds of 35 knots (65 km/h; 40 mph). The ship's company consisted of 24 officers and 312 sailors.

As a guided missile destroyer, Brisbane's main armament consisted of a Mark 13 missile launcher firing Tartar missiles and two Ikara anti-submarine missile launchers. This was supplemented by two 5"/54 calibre Mark 42 guns and two Mark 32 triple torpedo tube sets. Over the course of the ship's career, the Mark 13 launcher was modified to fire Standard missiles, two Phalanx CIWS units were installed in 1990, and the Ikara launchers were removed in 1991.

Brisbane was laid down by the Defoe Shipbuilding Company at Bay City, Michigan on 15 February 1965. The ship was launched on 5 May 1966 by the wife of Fred Chaney, Sr., the Minister for the Navy. Brisbane was handed over to the RAN at Boston Navy Yard on 7 December 1967, and was commissioned into the RAN nine days later. The cost of the destroyer was approximately A$50 million. The ship was given the nicknames Steel Cat and Fighting Forty-One (references to her ship's badge and pennant number respectively). During construction, the ship was assigned the United States Navy hull number DDG-27.

Brisbane spent the first nine months of her career undergoing exercises in US waters, before sailing for Australia on 28 September 1968. After visits to Pearl Harbor and Suva, Brisbane arrived in her namesake city on 17 October.

== Operational history ==
=== Vietnam deployments ===
During the mid-1960s, the United States government pressured Australia to increase the resources it was committing to the Vietnam War; one of the requests was for a combat vessel to help the USN meet the demand for naval gunfire support operations. The idea of deploying a RAN combat ship to the Vietnam War was initially hampered by the number of ships available, particularly with commitments to the Far East Strategic Reserve and involvement in the Indonesia-Malaysia Confrontation, along with the difficulty of operating and maintaining British-designed ships with USN resources. On 14 December 1966, the Australian Cabinet approved the deployment of Hobart as part of increases to Australian military commitment to the conflict. Brisbane operated in one of three roles:

- Naval gunfire support operations to assist ground forces, particularly the United States Marine Corps units operating closest to the North Vietnam border. Seven ships were usually stationed on the 'gunline', and attacks fell into two categories: 'unspotted' shelling of areas where North Vietnamese or Viet Cong forces and facilities were known or believed to be, and 'spotted' fire missions in direct support of ground troops. In this role, Brisbane operated under the callsign "Flamboyant".
- Anti-infiltration operations under Operation Market Time, which aimed to stop the logistic supply and reinforcement of Viet Cong units operating in South Vietnam by tracking, intercepting, and searching coastal shipping. RAN destroyers were never formally assigned to Market Time, but the overlap of the gunline and Market Time operational areas meant the ships were often called on to assist by tracking suspicious ships or participating in raids.
- Escort of USN aircraft carriers involved in Operation Rolling Thunder airstrikes.

Sister ships Hobart and Perth had also been involved in shipping interdiction patrols along the coast of North Vietnam as part of Operation Sea Dragon, but this operation had ended by the time of Brisbane's first deployment. Although RAN ships on deployment were expected to fulfil all duties of an equivalent American destroyer, they were forbidden by the Australian government from operating outside the Vietnam theatre on unrelated Seventh Fleet duties (such as the Taiwan Patrol Force, guard ship duties at Hong Kong, or the Space Recovery Program). After the invasion of Cambodia in 1970, RAN ships were also prohibited from entering Cambodian waters.

While deployed to Vietnam, the destroyers were placed under the administrative control of Commander Australian Forces Vietnam in addition to that of the Flag Officer Commanding Australian Fleet. Operationally, the RAN vessels were under the command of the United States Seventh Fleet. Arrangements were made to provide logistic support through the United States Pacific Fleet. A USN lieutenant was assigned to each ship during deployments to act as a liaison with the Seventh Fleet. The deployment of HMAS Hobart in March 1967 began a pattern of six-month deployments for RAN destroyers, with a constant RAN presence with the Seventh Fleet. Australia was the only allied nation to provide naval support to the United States Navy during the Vietnam War.

==== First deployment ====
After time in Australian waters to prepare for wartime service, Brisbane arrived in Subic on 28 March 1969 to be deployed to the Vietnam War. Responsibility was handed over from Perth on 31 March, and the ship spent the first two weeks of April undergoing familiarisation exercises and having both gun turrets repaired following equipment failures early on. The destroyer was first deployed to naval gunfire support duties, and arrived off the IV Corps operating area on 15 April. During this period, there was a surge in Market Time activity, and although Brisbane was not assigned to that operation, she was asked to provide gunfire assistance on several occasions. On 5 May, Brisbane was ordered to the Gulf of Thailand to provide support for South Vietnamese forces operating near the Cambodian border. The destroyer was relieved on 18 May by USS Waddell, and sailed to Subic for maintenance. On 10 June, the Australian ship relieved USS Rupertus and commenced gunline duties in the II Corps Area. After four days, during which Brisbane and USS Rowan completed a combined 189 fire missions, the Australian ship was ordered north to I Corps to relieve the American cruiser USS Saint Paul. Here, the Australian ship provided support for 3rd Battalion 3rd Marines during Operation Virginia Ridge. Brisbane returned to the II Corps area on 24 June, but only remained in the area for four days; on 29 June, the ship was relieved by USS James E. Kyes, and sailed to Singapore for maintenance and refit. En route to Singapore, the destroyer encountered the merchant vessel MV Sincere, which was on fire. After unsuccessfully attempting to extinguish the fire, Brisbane evacuated Sincere's crew, and remained in the area until the salvage vessel Salvana arrived to take the stricken vessel in tow.

Brisbane returned to operations in II Corps on 15 July. On 22 July, near the end of a shore bombardment operation, a premature explosion occurred in the barrel of the forward gun turret; casualties were limited to one sailor with a fractured wrist, but the turret was unusable. On the ship's return to Subic on 3 August, the damaged turret was removed, but as the replacement turret would not arrive until September, Brisbane would complete the deployment with only a single gun turret. After the completion of maintenance, Brisbane returned to duty on 23 August, but instead of gunline duties, was assigned as the head of the escort screen for the aircraft carrier USS Oriskany. The ships were deployed to Yankee Station, with Brisbane and USS Perkins (plus other destroyers on occasion) performing escort and plane guard duties. On 12 September, Oriskany and Perkins departed, and were replaced by USS Constellation and USS Floyd B. Parks respectively. On 14 September, Brisbane sailed to Subic for maintenance and fitting of the replacement turret, then departed on 1 October for Sydney, having been relieved by the Daring-class destroyer HMAS Vendetta two days earlier. Arriving on 13 October, Brisbane was almost immediately docked for a major refit, which lasted until 15 July 1970.

Brisbane's tour was considered quieter than those experienced previously by Australian ships. This, combined with the damage to the forward gun turret and other defects, meant that the destroyer only fired 7,891 shells during the six-month deployment. Two officers from the ship were Mentioned in Despatches, while other personnel awards included a British Empire Medal and 25 Naval Board commendations.

==== Second deployment ====
On 29 March 1971, Brisbane relieved Perth of Vietnam duties. The ship was assigned to Military Region 3 for gunfire support duties, and arrived on 5 April. Shortly after, the destroyer was moved south to Military Region 4. She returned to Military Region 3 on 15 April. The first period on the gunline during that time concluded on 20 April, during which gunfire support operations had occurred on only 11 of the 16 days. The destroyer returned to the gunline on 15 May, with Brisbane's commanding officer tasked as the overall commander of gunfire operations; the only time the position was held by a RAN officer. Brisbane was assigned to operate near the Demilitarized Zone. The ship was relieved on 31 May and sailed to Danang. The destroyer was then assigned to escort the carrier USS Kitty Hawk. During 3 and 4 May, Brisbane was detached to provide cover for the repatriation of prisoners-of-war to North Vietnam. The operation did not go ahead, as only 13 of the 570 prisoners wanted to return to North Vietnam, and the North Vietnamese government refused to accept them. Brisbane returned to carrier escort duties, where she remained until sailing to Hong Kong for maintenance on 12 June.

On 24 June, Brisbane was assigned back to gunline duties in Military Region 3. Activity was minimal, and the ship was redeployed to Military Region 4 on 26 June. Foul weather prevented gunfire support operations until 30 June, but the rate of activity increased, with 60 fire missions completed by the end of the three-week period. In mid-July, after a short stint back in Region 3, Brisbane sailed to Subic for maintenance and leave. On 15 August, the destroyer commenced gunfire support operations off the Demilitarized Zone. A spike in activity had resulted in the deployment of two gunfire support ships, with Brisbane and USS Berkeley rotating between being the active vessel and being on 15 minutes standby to provide assistance. On 21 August, Berkeley was relieved by USS Shelton. Of the 7,231 shells fired during the second deployment, 2,127 were fired from 15 August onwards, which caused a problem as the rate of fire would cause the gun barrels to come up for replacing a week before the destroyer was due to rotate off the gunline. The amount of wear had yet to compromise accuracy, and the destroyer was instructed to continue gunfire missions, while the cruiser USS Oklahoma City and the destroyer USS Rogers were deployed to the gunline in support of Brisbane; the Australian destroyer only firing if targets were out of the other ships' range or they were otherwise unavailable. Brisbane's second Vietnam deployment concluded on 5 September.

During 1971, the Australian government decided to withdraw all forces from Vietnam by the end of the year; Brisbane was the last ship to make a combat deployment to Vietnam, and was not replaced when the deployment ended. Brisbane received the first of two battle honours, "Vietnam 1969–71", for her Vietnam service. Personnel awards for the deployment included 24 Naval Board commendations, two personnel Mentioned in Despatches, and the appointment of the ship's commanding officer as a Commander of the Order of the British Empire.

=== 1970s and 1980s ===
On 11 March 1974, Brisbane was docked for a major refit. This concluded on 3 October, but the destroyer remained in Sydney for the rest of the year. During the night of 24–25 December 1974, Cyclone Tracy destroyed the city of Darwin; the destroyer's personnel were recalled from leave, and she left early on 26 December in the company of HMAS Melbourne, which was loaded with relief supplies. Brisbane sped ahead and arrived on 31 December, setting up communications between the relief force and Canberra. The destroyer's participation on Operation Navy Help Darwin, the RAN's largest disaster-relief operation, was the longest of any RAN vessel; the first to arrive, and the last to depart on 31 January 1975. In addition to facilitating communications, Brisbane's personnel were responsible for clearing sites for helicopters and headquarters, salvaging boats and equipment, repairs of infrastructure, and installation of power generators: on average, 160 of the ship's company went ashore each day.

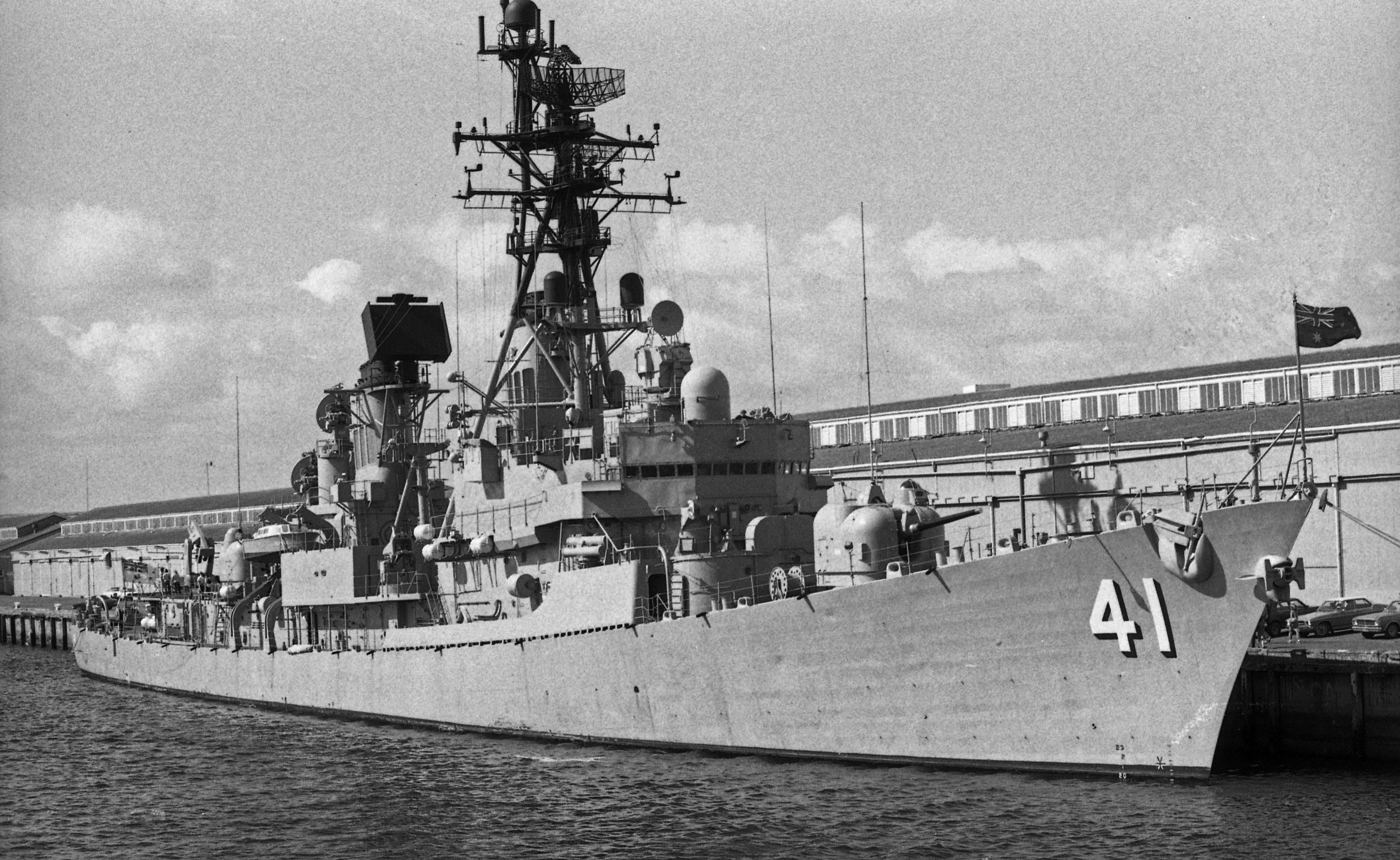
Brisbane at Port Adelaide in 1981

On 16 July 1975, Brisbane sailed for a deployment to the Far East Strategic Reserve. This concluded on 5 November, with the destroyer returning to Sydney and docking for maintenance. In early 1977, Brisbane participated in the RIMPAC multinational exercise. In April 1977, Brisbane and HMNZS Canterbury were assigned to escort Melbourne during a five-month return trip to the United Kingdom for the Silver Jubilee Naval Review. On 9 May, one of the carrier's Sea King helicopters was forced to ditch in the Indian Ocean: Brisbane successfully recovered the aircrew. The ships participated in the naval review at Spithead on 28 June, and Brisbane returned to Sydney on 4 October, entering dock for refit eight days later. This maintenance period lasted until May 1979, and saw the ship's propulsion system converted from fuel oil to diesel, updates to the combat system, and installation of an AN/SPS-40C radar. Apart from a visit to New Zealand, Brisbane spent the rest of 1979 in Australian waters.

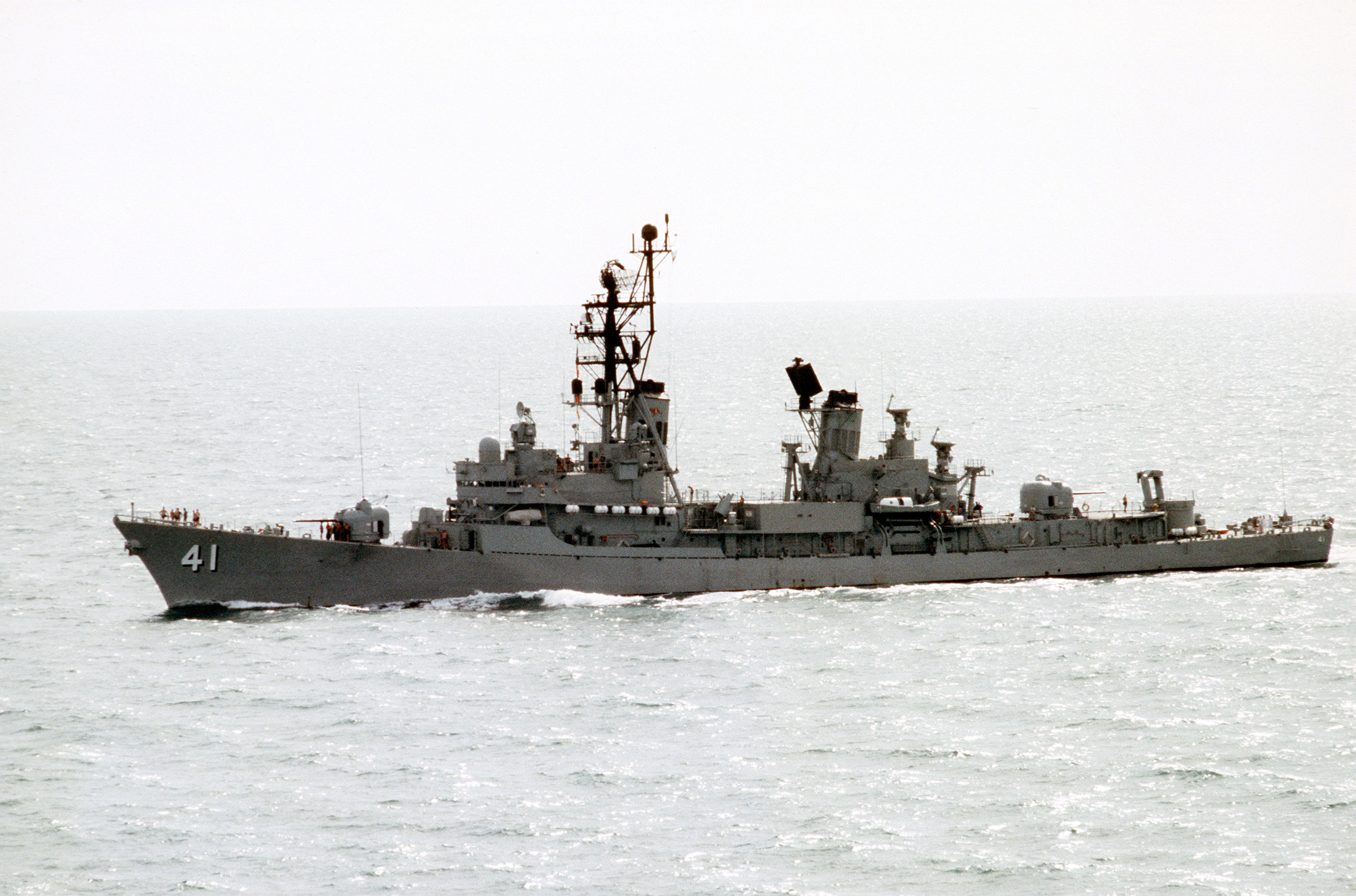
Brisbane underway in 1984

During the early 1980s, the destroyer participated in RIMPAC exercises, and made patrols of the Indian Ocean. From 16 August 1982 to 5 August 1983, Brisbane underwent refit, after which, the destroyer remained docked alongside at Garden Island until March 1984. Another refit period occurred between September 1985 to October 1987. In early 1988, Brisbane visited Melbourne for the Moomba festal, then sailed to her namesake city in August to participate in a 'Shopwindow' exercise with ships of the Royal New Zealand Navy. In October, the destroyer was deployed to South-east Asia for three months, returning to Darwin on 8 January 1989. During June and July, the ship made visits to ports in New Zealand, Vanuatu, and the Solomon Islands. Brisbane attended RIMPAC during April and May 1990, then returned to Australia to prepare for deployment to the Persian Gulf as part of Operation Damask.

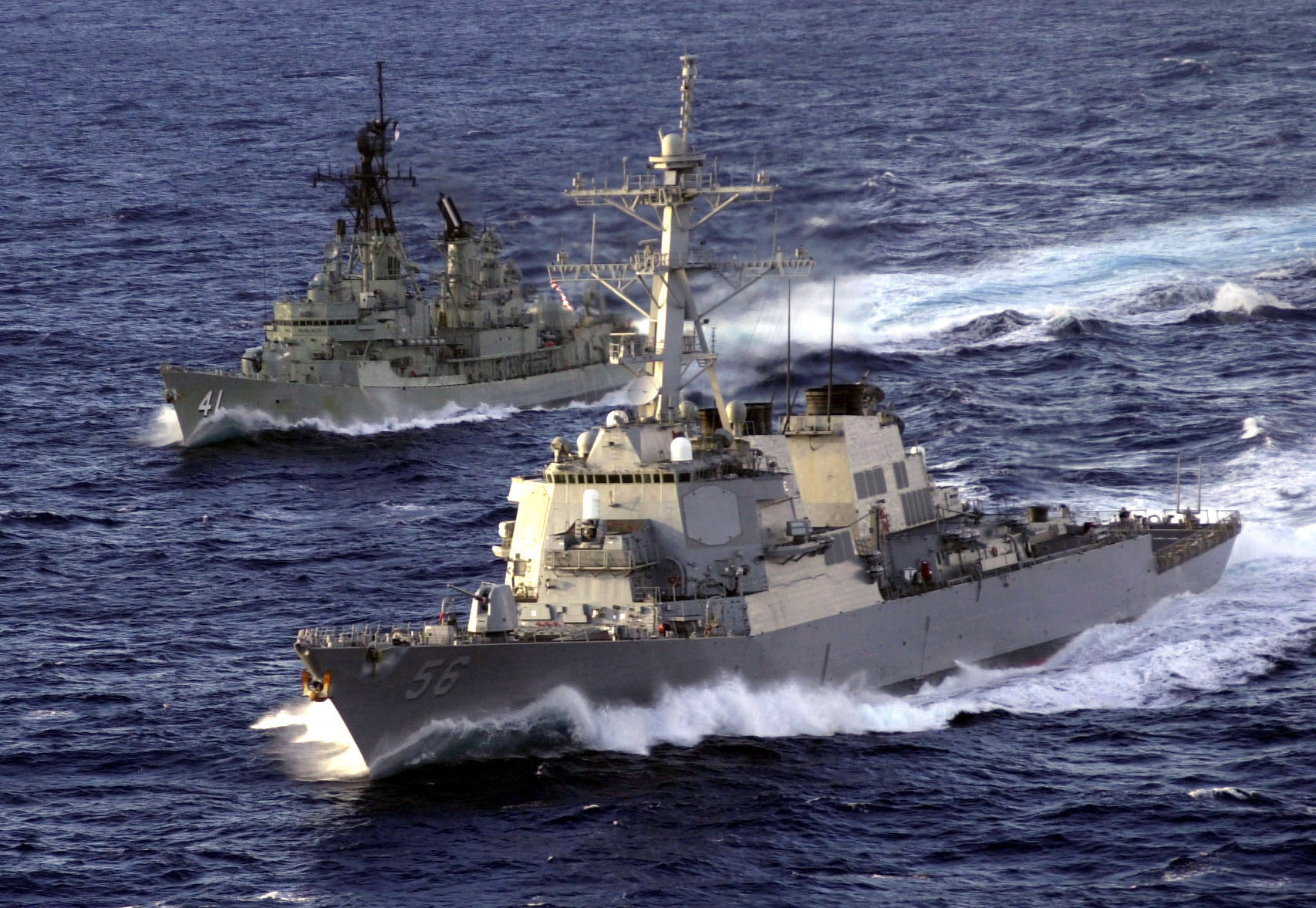
Brisbane (background) cruising alongside the US Navy destroyer John S. McCain in 2001

=== Operation Damask ===
Brisbane arrived in the Gulf on 6 December 1990 to serve as part of the naval blockade. She was attached to the United States Navy battle group from 17 January to 28 February 1991. In late March, the destroyer sailed home via Singapore. Brisbane was awarded the Meritorious Unit Citation by the Australian government for her actions during Operation Damask. Brisbane also earned a second battle honour, "Kuwait 1990–91".

=== 1990s and 2000s ===
During late 1992, Brisbane was operating in South-east Asia. The ship spent most of 1993 exercising along Australia's east coast, then docked for a refit lasting from August 1993 until May 1994. The destroyer was deployed to South-east Asia for exercises, flag-showing, and port visits on four occasions between 1994 and 1996, then again in late 1998.

During August 1999, Brisbane participated in Exercise Kakadu. During this, a fire broke out in the ship's forward gun turret, which was quickly extinguished. In March 2000, Brisbane was one of three RAN ships to participate in a Royal New Zealand Navy fleet concentration period.

== Decommissioning and fate ==
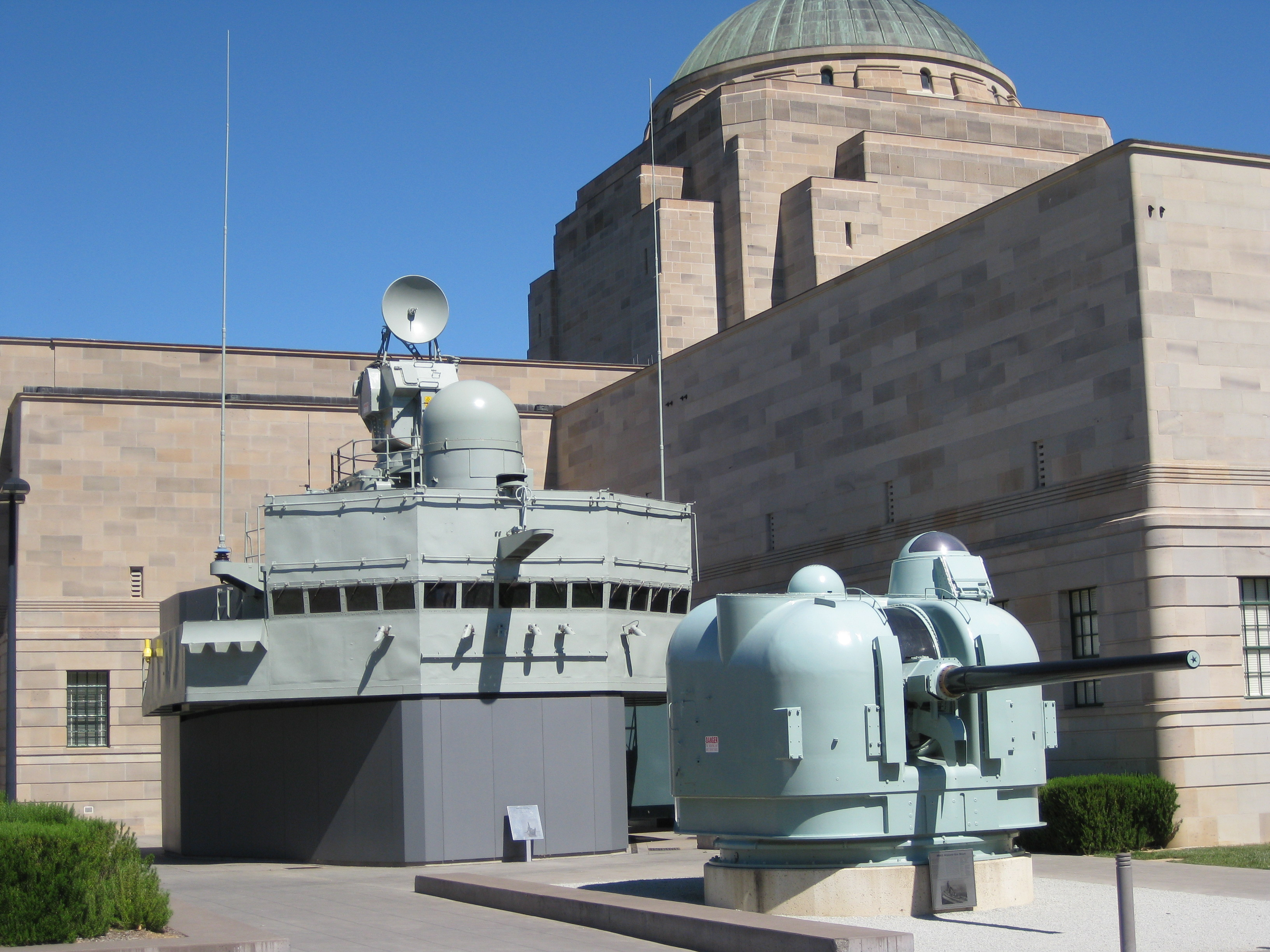
Brisbane's bridge and gun turret outside the Australian War Memorial

Brisbane paid off on 19 October 2001. Among the initial ideas for the ship's disposal was a proposal to donate the destroyer to the Australian National Maritime Museum as a replacement for the Daring-class destroyer HMAS Vampire. Brisbane was eventually marked for scuttling as a dive wreck off the coast of Queensland. Her bridge and one of her 5-inch (127 mm) guns were removed and preserved at the Australian War Memorial in Canberra, which were incorporated into the post-1945 galleries, which opened in 2007. The ship's air search radar was donated to the Royal Thai Navy in 2002 to help the Thais maintain their naval capabilities.

Brisbane was sunk approximately 2.8 nautical miles (5.2 km; 3.2 mi) off the coast of Mudjimba, Sunshine Coast, Queensland, on 31 July 2005 in 27 metres (89 ft) of water. Brisbane was filled with 200 to 250 tonnes (200 to 250 long tons; 220 to 280 short tons) of concrete, and 38 small charges were detonated to breach the hull. Brisbane sank in two minutes and ten seconds, coming to rest with the keel embedded a metre into the seabed and facing the ocean currents, and the uppermost part of the ship 3 metres (9.8 ft) below sea level.

The wreck site has been colonised by sponges, soft corals, and hard corals, while over 200 different species of fish have been sighted in the area. A 2009 study of the value of protected areas estimated that the wreck had contributed A$18 million to the Sunshine Coast economy. In July 2010, the Queensland State Government was forced to step up patrols of the wreck site because people were illegally using the dive exclusion zone as a fishing site. As part of celebrations for the tenth anniversary of Brisbane's scuttling, 92.7 MIX FM conducted the world's first live underwater radio broadcast from the wreck on 31 July 2015.
