= USS Sellers =

Charles F. Adams-class destroyer

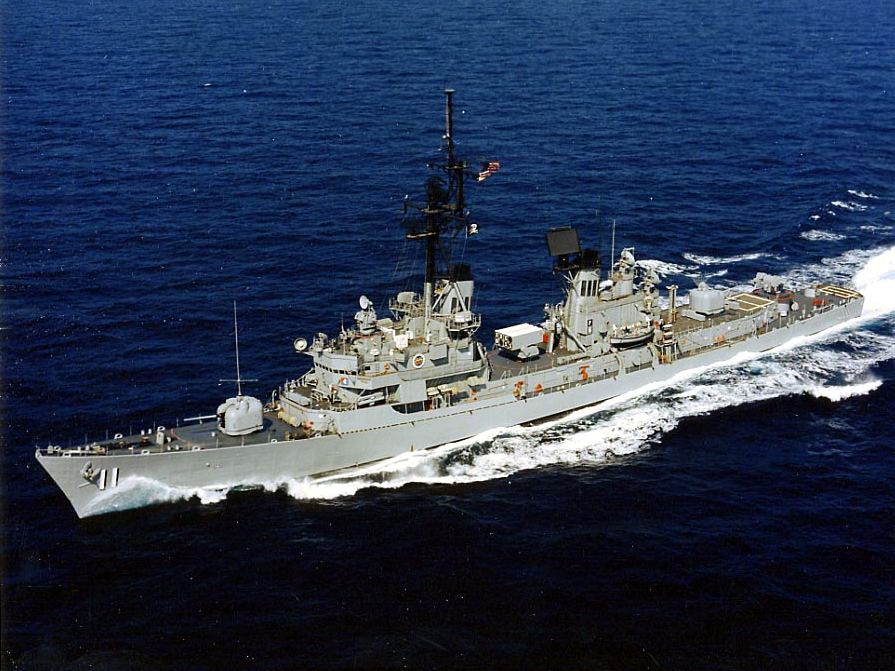
- USS Sellers underway in the 1980s

History

United States
- Name: Sellers
- Namesake: David F. Sellers
- Ordered: 17 January 1958
- Builder: Bath Iron Works
- Laid down: 3 August 1959
- Launched: 9 September 1960
- Acquired: 20 October 1961
- Commissioned: 28 October 1961
- Decommissioned: 31 October 1989
- Stricken: 20 November 1992
- Identification: Callsign: NIUZ; Hull number: DDG-11
- Motto: Guardian of Freedom
- Fate: Scrapped, 15 September 2004
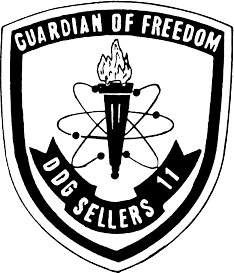
- Badge

General characteristics
- Class & type: Charles F. Adams-class destroyer
- Displacement: 3,277 tons standard, 4,526 full load
- Length: 437 ft (133 m)
- Beam: 47 ft (14 m)
- Draft: 15 ft (4.6 m)
- Propulsion: 2 × General Electric steam turbines providing 70,000 shp (52 MW); 2 shafts; 4 × Babcock & Wilcox 1,275 psi (8,790 kPa) boilers
- Speed: 33 knots (61 km/h; 38 mph)
- Range: 4,500 nautical miles (8,300 km) at 20 knots (37 km/h)
- Complement: 338 (18 officers, 320 enlisted)
- Sensors & processing systems: AN/SPS-39 3D air search radar; AN/SPS-10 surface search radar; AN/SPG-51 missile fire control radar; AN/SPG-53 gunfire control radar; AN/SQS-23 Sonar and the hull mounted SQQ-23 Pair Sonar for DDG-2 through 19; AN/SPS-40 Air Search Radar
- Armament: 1 × Mk 11 missile launcher for RIM-24 Tartar SAM system, or later the RIM-66 Standard (SM-1) and Harpoon antiship missile; 2 × 5"/54 caliber Mark 42 (127 mm) gun; 1 × 8-cell RUR-5 ASROC launcher; 2 × triple 12.75-inch (324 mm) Mk 32 torpedo tubes)

USS Sellers (DDG-11) was a Charles F. Adams-class guided-missile destroyer built for the United States Navy in the 1950s.

== Design and description ==
The Charles F. Addams class was based on a stretched Forrest Sherman-class destroyer hull modified to accommodate smaller RIM-24 Tartar surface-to-air missiles and all their associated equipment. The ships had an overall length of 437 feet (133.2 m), a beam of 47 feet (14.3 m) and a deep draft of 15 feet (4.6 m). They displaced 4,526 long tons (4,599 t) at full load. Their crew consisted of 18 officers and 320 enlisted men.

The ships were equipped with two geared steam turbines, each driving one propeller shaft, using steam provided by four water-tube boilers. The turbines were intended to produce 70,000 shaft horsepower (52,000 kW) to reach the designed speed of 33 knots (61 km/h; 38 mph). The Adams class had a range of 4,500 nautical miles (8,300 km; 5,200 mi) at a speed of 20 knots (37 km/h; 23 mph).

The Charles F. Adams-class ships were armed with two 5"/54 caliber Mark 42 guns, one forward and one aft of the superstructure. They were fitted with an eight-round ASROC launcher between the funnels. Close-range anti-submarine defense was provided by two triple sets of 12.75-inch (324 mm) Mk 32 torpedo tubes. The primary armament of the ships was the Tartar surface-to-air missile designed to defend the carrier battle group. They were fired via the dual-arm Mk 11 missile launcher and the ships stowed a total of 42 missiles for the launcher.

== Construction and career ==
Sellers, named for Admiral David F. Sellers, was laid down by the Bath Iron Works at Bath in Maine on 3 August 1959, launched on 9 September 1960 by Mrs. Hugh Scott and commissioned on 28 October 1961. Sellers was decommissioned on 31 October 1989, stricken from the Naval Vessel Register on 20 November 1992 and sold on 25 July 1995.

As of 2005, no other U.S. Navy ship has been named Sellers.
