= USS Charles F. Adams =

Charles F. Adams-class destroyer

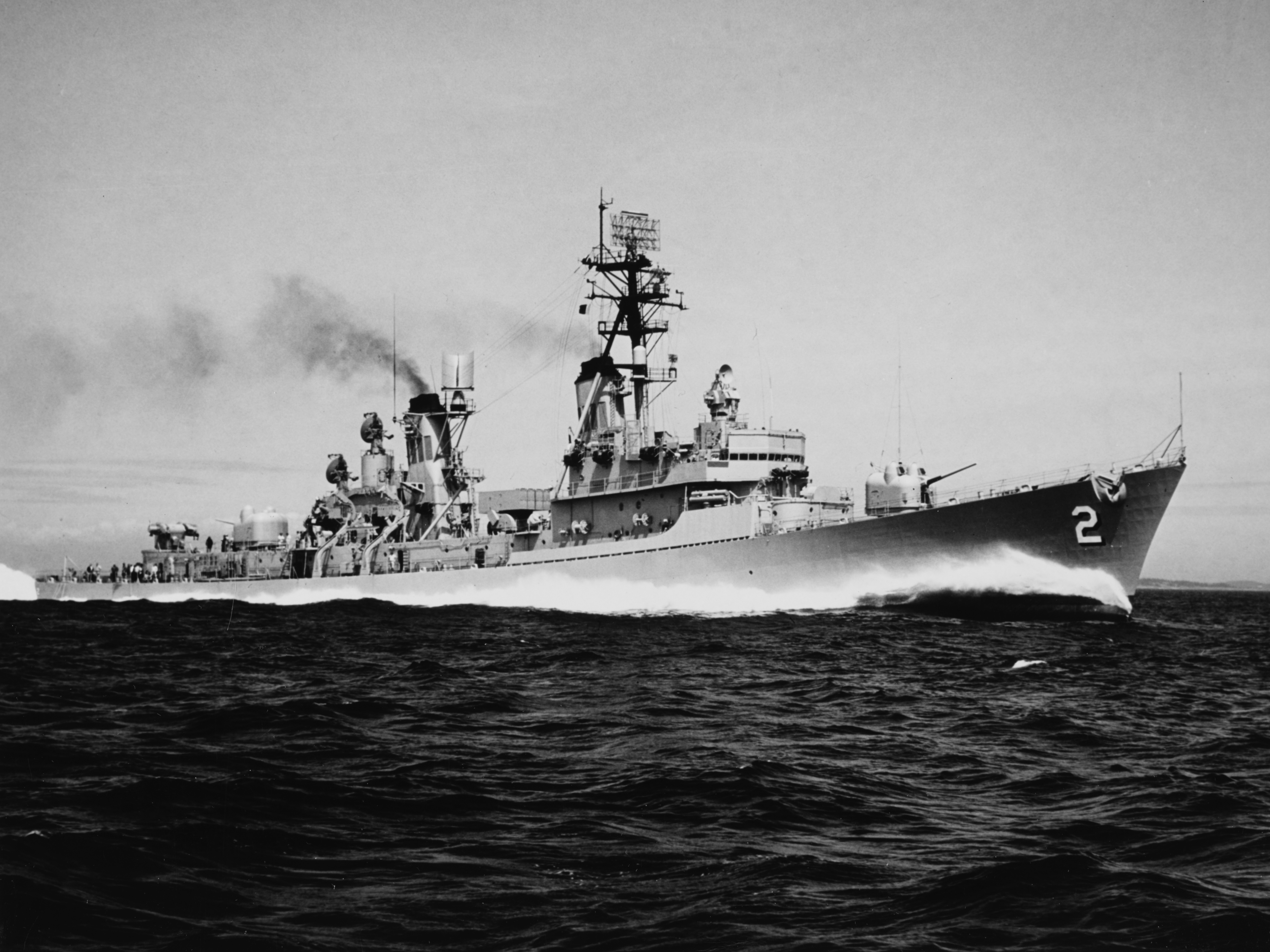
- USS Charles F Adams during her sea trial on 31 August 1960

History

United States
- Name: Charles F Adams
- Namesake: Charles Francis Adams III
- Ordered: 28 March 1957
- Builder: Bath Iron Works
- Laid down: 16 June 1958
- Launched: 8 September 1959
- Commissioned: 10 September 1960
- Decommissioned: 1 August 1990
- Reclassified: DDG-2, 23 April 1957
- Stricken: 1 August 1990
- Identification: Callsign: NBJR; Hull number: DD-952
- Motto: First in class, second to none
- Fate: Scrapped, 2021
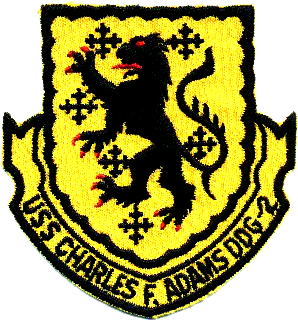
- Badge

General characteristics
- Class & type: Charles F. Adams-class destroyer
- Displacement: 3,277 tons standard; 4,526 full load
- Length: 437 ft (133 m)
- Beam: 47 ft (14 m)
- Draft: 15 ft (4.6 m)
- Propulsion: 2 × General Electric steam turbines providing 70,000 shp (52 MW); 2 shafts; 4 × Babcock & Wilcox 1,275 psi (8,790 kPa) boilers
- Speed: 33 knots (61 km/h; 38 mph)
- Range: 4,500 nautical miles (8,300 km) at 20 knots (37 km/h)
- Complement: 354 (24 officers, 330 enlisted)
- Sensors & processing systems: AN/SPS-39 3D air search radar; AN/SPS-10 surface search radar; AN/SPG-51 missile fire control radar; AN/SPG-53 gunfire control radar; AN/SQS-23 Sonar and the hull mounted SQQ-23 Pair Sonar for DDG-2 through 19; AN/SPS-40 Air Search Radar
- Armament: 1 Mk 11 missile launcher for RIM-24 Tartar SAM system, or later the RIM-66 Standard (SM-1) and Harpoon antiship missile; 2 × 5"/54 caliber Mark 42 (127 mm) gun; 1 × RUR-5 ASROC Launcher; 6 × 12.8 in (324 mm) ASW torpedo tubes (2 x Mark 32 Surface Vessel Torpedo Tubes)

USS Charles F. Adams (DD-952/DDG-2), named for Charles Francis Adams III (Secretary of the Navy from 1929 to 1933), was the lead ship of her class of guided missile destroyers of the United States Navy. Commissioned in 1960, during her 30-year operational history she participated in the recovery operation for the Mercury 8 space mission, and the Cuban Missile Crisis, as well as operations in the Indian Ocean and Arabian Sea. Decommissioned in 1990, attempts to save her as a museum ship failed and she was scrapped in 2021.

== History ==
The ship was laid down by the Bath Iron Works at Bath, Maine, on 16 June 1958, launched on 8 September 1959 by Mrs. R. Homans, sister of Mr. Adams, commissioned on 10 September 1960, and stationed in its homeport of Charleston, South Carolina.

Intended as a follow-on to the Forrest Sherman-class destroyers, the ship was originally designated as DD-952. Outwardly similar to the Forrest Sherman class, Charles F. Adams was the first U.S. Navy ship designed from the keel up to launch anti-aircraft missiles. To reflect the increased capabilities of the ship and to distinguish her from previous destroyer designs, Charles F. Adams was re-designated DDG-2 prior to the ship's launching.

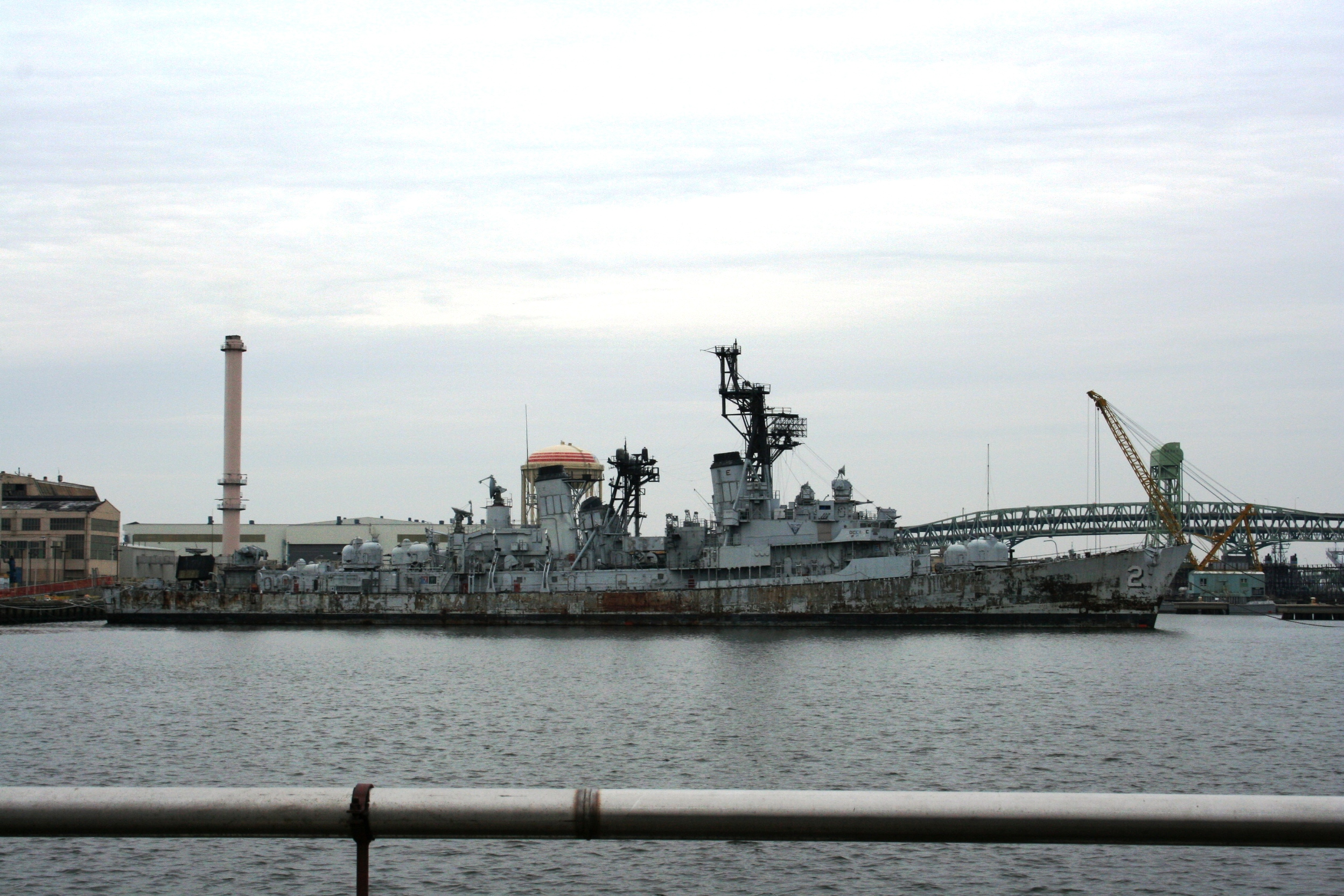
USS Charles F. Adams at the Philadelphia Naval Shipyard

Following commissioning, Charles F. Adams took part in recovery operations for Walter M. Schirra's Mercury 8 mission. While engaged in this operation the Cuban Missile Crisis developed and Charles F. Adams moved to the Caribbean Sea as part of the quarantine forces around the island of Cuba. In July 1969, Charles F. Adams left her homeport of Charleston and relocated to Mayport, Florida.

On 19 November 1980 Charles F. Adams under the command of Commander Joseph F. McCarton, sailed with USS Independence and her battle group to the Arabian Sea and Indian Ocean, during which the ship made a port call to the town of Bunbury, Western Australia from 3–7 February 1981. Charles F. Adams returned home to Mayport on 9 June 1981.

=== Decommissioning and disposal ===
Charles F. Adams was decommissioned and stricken from the Naval Vessel Register on 1 August 1990. Attempts were made to acquire the ship as a museum while it was being stored on Donation Hold status at the Philadelphia Naval Shipyard in Pennsylvania.

The Saginaw Valley Naval Ship Museum attempted to acquire the ship as a museum and memorial to be located in Bay City, Michigan; however, the cost of preparing the ship for movement through the Saint Lawrence Seaway proved too expensive and the project was abandoned.

In 2008 she was considered for preservation by the Adams Class Veteran's Association and the Jacksonville Historic Naval Ship Association (JHNSA) in Jacksonville, Florida. An application was delivered to the U.S. Navy for same on 31 March 2008.

In October 2010, the Jacksonville City Council supported efforts to bring the ship to Jacksonville as a museum ship, given the vessel's historical past association with nearby Naval Station Mayport. The preservation effort was estimated to require approximately $300,000 to tow the ship to Jacksonville from the Navy's Inactive Ship Facility in Philadelphia, $3 million for repairs and restoration of the vessel, and $5 million to construct a pier to moor it. By late 2013, the preservation groups had raised about $1.4 million.

On 27 August 2014, the Jacksonville City Council approved a lease of city-owned riverfront property to the JHNSA and authorized the Downtown Investment Authority to manage the project. The groups expected to have the ship moored downtown on the St. Johns River by the end of 2015. Jacksonville Jaguars owner Shad Khan's proposal to develop the riverfront included a location for the ship.

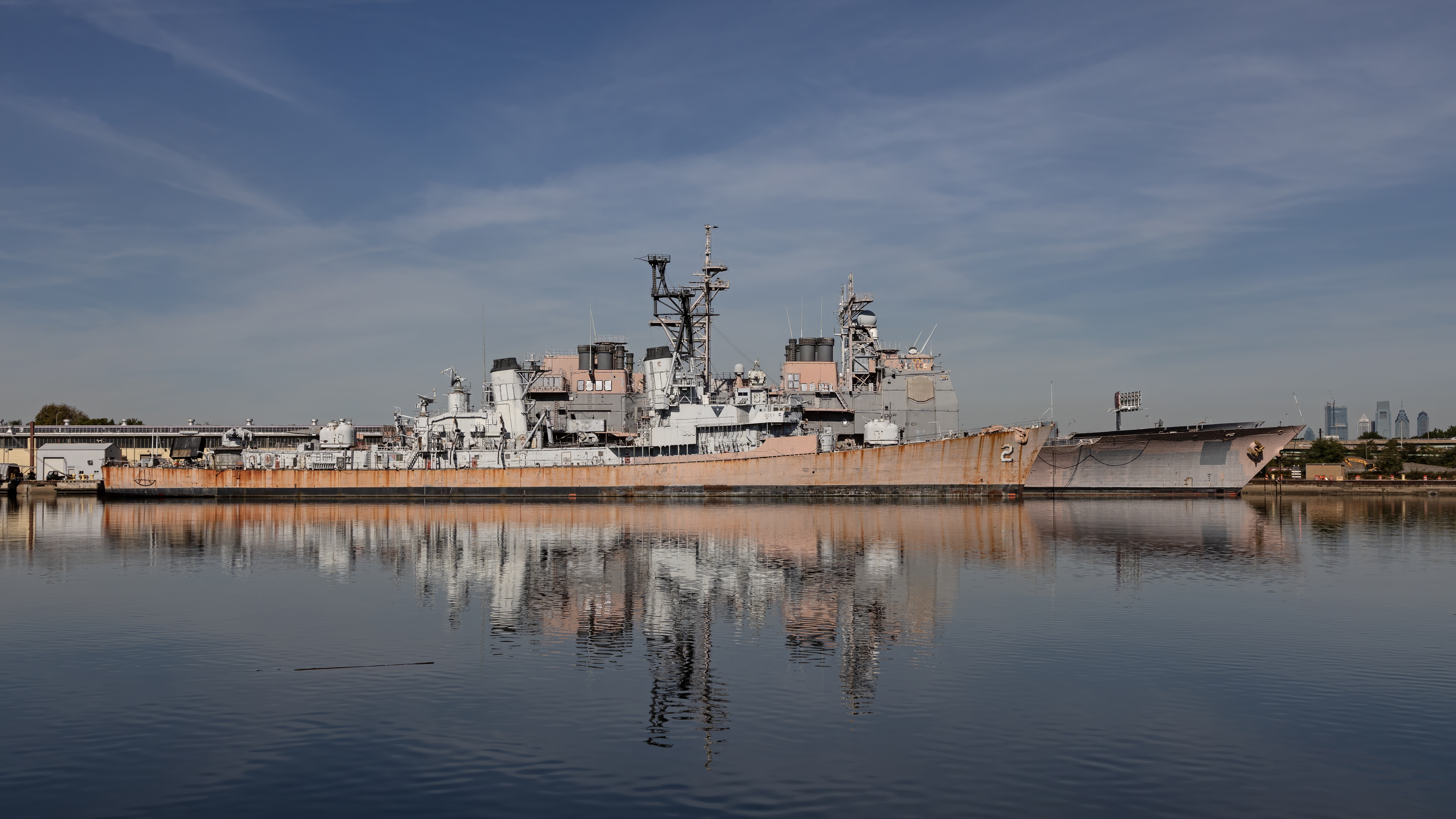
The USS Charles F. Adams in the basin at the PNISMF, October of 2017. Behind her are two Ticonderoga Class Cruisers.

In December 2018, plans to bring Charles F. Adams to Jacksonville were abandoned in light of the continued reluctance of the Navy, for reasons that were never clearly articulated, to release the ship to the JHNSA; the JHNSA believes that the Navy preferred demolition of the ship versus transfer of the Charles F. Adams to the JHNSA and its conversion to a museum ship.

In September 2020, the Charles F. Adams left Philadelphia Navy Yard under tow, bound for Brownsville, Texas, for scrapping. Scrapping was completed by July 2, 2021

== Sources ==
- Wadsworth, Rick (1998). "Question 17/97: USN/USCG Collisions with Merchant vessels". Warship International. XXXV (3). International Naval Research Organization: 320. ISSN 0043-0374.
