= USS Semmes (DDG-18) =

Charles F. Adams-class destroyer

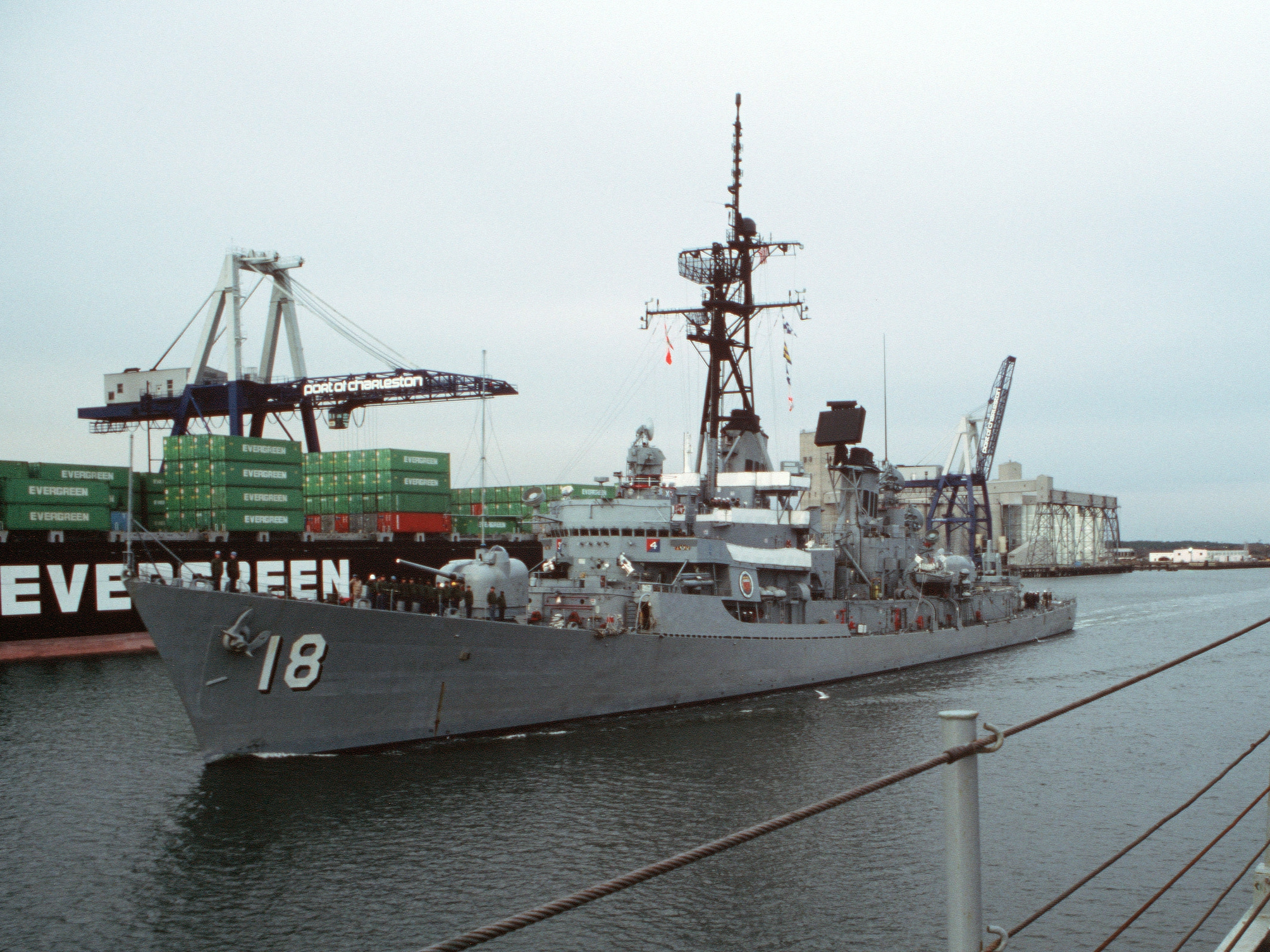
- USS Semmes at Charleston in 1988

History

United States
- Name: Semmes
- Namesake: Raphael Semmes
- Ordered: 21 July 1959
- Builder: Avondale Marine Ways, Inc.
- Laid down: 15 August 1960
- Launched: 20 May 1961
- Acquired: 30 November 1962
- Commissioned: 10 December 1962
- Decommissioned: 14 April 1991
- Stricken: 14 April 1991
- Identification: Callsign: NGMV; Hull number: DDG-18
- Motto: Dare to Excel
- Fate: Sold to Greece, 13 September 1991
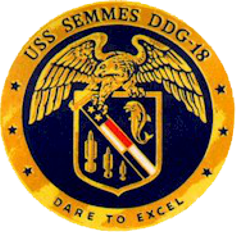
- Badge

Greece
- Name: Kimon
- Namesake: Kimon
- Commissioned: 13 September 1991
- Decommissioned: 17 June 2004
- Identification: Hull number: D218
- Fate: Scrapped, Fall 2006

General characteristics
- Class & type: Charles F. Adams-class destroyer
- Displacement: 3,277 tons standard, 4,526 full load
- Length: 437 ft (133 m)
- Beam: 47 ft (14 m)
- Draft: 15 ft (4.6 m)
- Propulsion: 2 × General Electric steam turbines providing 70,000 shp (52 MW); 2 shafts; 4 × Combustion Engineering 1,275 psi (8,790 kPa) boilers
- Speed: 33 knots (61 km/h; 38 mph)
- Range: 4,500 nautical miles (8,300 km) at 20 knots (37 km/h)
- Complement: 354 (24 officers, 330 enlisted)
- Sensors & processing systems: AN/SPS-39 3D air search radar; AN/SPS-10 surface search radar; AN/SPG-51 missile fire control radar; AN/SPG-53 gunfire control radar; AN/SQS-23 Sonar and the hull mounted SQQ-23 Pair Sonar for DDG-2 through 19; AN/SPS-40 Air Search Radar
- Armament: 1 x Mk 13 single arm missile launcher (DDG-15-24) for RIM-24 Tartar SAM system, or later the RIM-66 Standard (SM-1) and Harpoon anti-ship missile; 2 × 5 in (127 mm)/54 caliber Mark 42 gun; 1 × RUR-5 ASROC launcher; 4 × 12.8 in (325 mm) ASW torpedo tubes; 2 x Mk 32 surface vessel torpedo tubes

USS Semmes (DDG-18), was the second Navy ship named for Commander (USN), Rear Admiral (CSN), Brigadier General (CSA) Raphael Semmes (1809–1877). Semmes was a Charles F. Adams-class guided-missile destroyer of the United States Navy. Entering service in 1962, Semmes spent most of her career in the Atlantic and Mediterranean theaters. Decommissioned in 1991, Semmes was transferred to the Hellenic Navy and renamed Kimon. The destroyer was decommissioned for the final time in 2004 and sold for scrap in 2006.

== Construction and career ==
Semmes was laid down by Avondale Marine Ways, Inc. at Avondale, Louisiana on 15 August 1960 and launched on 20 May 1961 by Mrs. Felix Edward Hébert. Semmes was commissioned on 10 December 1962.

Following shakedown, Semmes joined Destroyer Division (DesDiv) 62, Destroyer Squadron (DesRon) 6, at Charleston, South Carolina, in July 1963; and, into the summer of 1964, participated in various fleet exercises in the Atlantic and Caribbean. After September 7, 1964, she sailed east for a six-week NATO exercise, "Masterstroke/Teamwork," in the North Atlantic-Norwegian Sea area; and, on 22 September, she crossed the Arctic Circle. Two months later, on 28 November, she deployed to the Mediterranean for her first tour, of four months, with the 6th Fleet. She returned to Charleston in time to participate in the 2nd Fleet's exercises during the spring of 1965. She then took part in support operations off the Dominican Republic.

From February to July 1966, the guided missile destroyer conducted her second tour with the 6th Fleet; and, on her return to the United States, changed her home port from Charleston to Norfolk, Virginia, effective 1 August, in anticipation of her first major overhaul at the Norfolk Naval Shipyard. In April 1967, Semmes resumed operations with refresher training in the Caribbean. In July, she rejoined DesRon 6 at Charleston; and, in August, she deployed for her third tour with the 6th Fleet. She participated in fleet and NATO exercises into January 1968; then returned to Charleston, arriving on 31 January for a month's rest before resuming operations in the Caribbean and off the east coast.

On 10 June, Semmes again sailed east. During that month and into July, she visited Germany and Denmark; then turned south for another 6th Fleet deployment. On 15 November, she was relieved by the destroyer USS John King at Rota, Spain; and, 11 days later, she returned to Charleston where she remained in port for the rest of the year.

In January 1969, she cleared Charleston to participate in ASW and "Springboard" exercises in the Puerto Rican operating area; then returned to her homeport. In April, she returned to the Caribbean for 2d Fleet exercises.

=== 1970s ===
Through the summer, Semmes continued to conduct exercises in the Caribbean and off the southeastern seaboard. In late September, she again crossed the Atlantic for a seven-month deployment with the 6th Fleet; and, on 10 February 1970, while moored at Naples, she was struck by the Greek freighter, SS Mautric. The damage sustained to her bow was quickly repaired; and, before the end of the month, she had resumed operations. By mid-March, she had arrived at Barcelona for turnover with USS Conyngham. On 18 March she departed the Mediterranean; and, on 28 March, she returned to Charleston.

During 1971, her schedule remained basically the same; but her annual tour with the 6th Fleet, 16 July to 11 October, was followed by visits to the Netherlands and to Denmark for bi-national and NATO operations. On 20 December, Semmes returned to South Carolina; and, in January 1972, she entered the Charleston Naval Shipyard for conversion of her engineering plant to the Navy Distillate Fuel Oil System. With the spring, she resumed operations off the east coast and in the Caribbean. In September, she participated in NATO exercise "Strong Express," which again took her above the Arctic Circle and which was followed by visits to Norway and Denmark. In October, she returned to Charleston. In November, she conducted exercises in the Caribbean; and, in December, she prepared for another deployment in the Mediterranean with NATO's Standing Naval Force, Atlantic.

After sea trials in the Charleston operating area, Semmes got underway from that port on 4 January 1973. She arrived in Portsmouth, England, on 15 January, joining the NATO naval force there. For the next seven months, the guided missile destroyer cruised the Atlantic visiting ports on both sides of that ocean and participating in three exercises: NATO Exercise "Sunny Seas", in January and February; Canadian Exercise MARCOT 2/73, in April and May; and Norwegian Exercise "Midnight Sun" in June. On 1 July, Semmes changed operational control back to the 2d Fleet and, nine days later, returned to Charleston.

Following a month of post-deployment standdown, from 10 July until 10 August, she resumed operations along the eastern seaboard and in the Caribbean. In November and December, she took part in Exercises "Fun in the Sun" and LANTREADEX 2–74. Semmes reentered Charleston on 19 December to prepare for overhaul.

=== Greek service ===
Semmes was decommissioned and stricken from the Naval Vessel Register on 14 April 1991, sold to Greece on 13 September 1991 and renamed Kimon. She was decommissioned on 17 June 2004, placed in reserve at Souda Bay, Crete until scrapped fall 2006.
