= Perth-class destroyer =

Destroyer class of the Royal Australian Navy

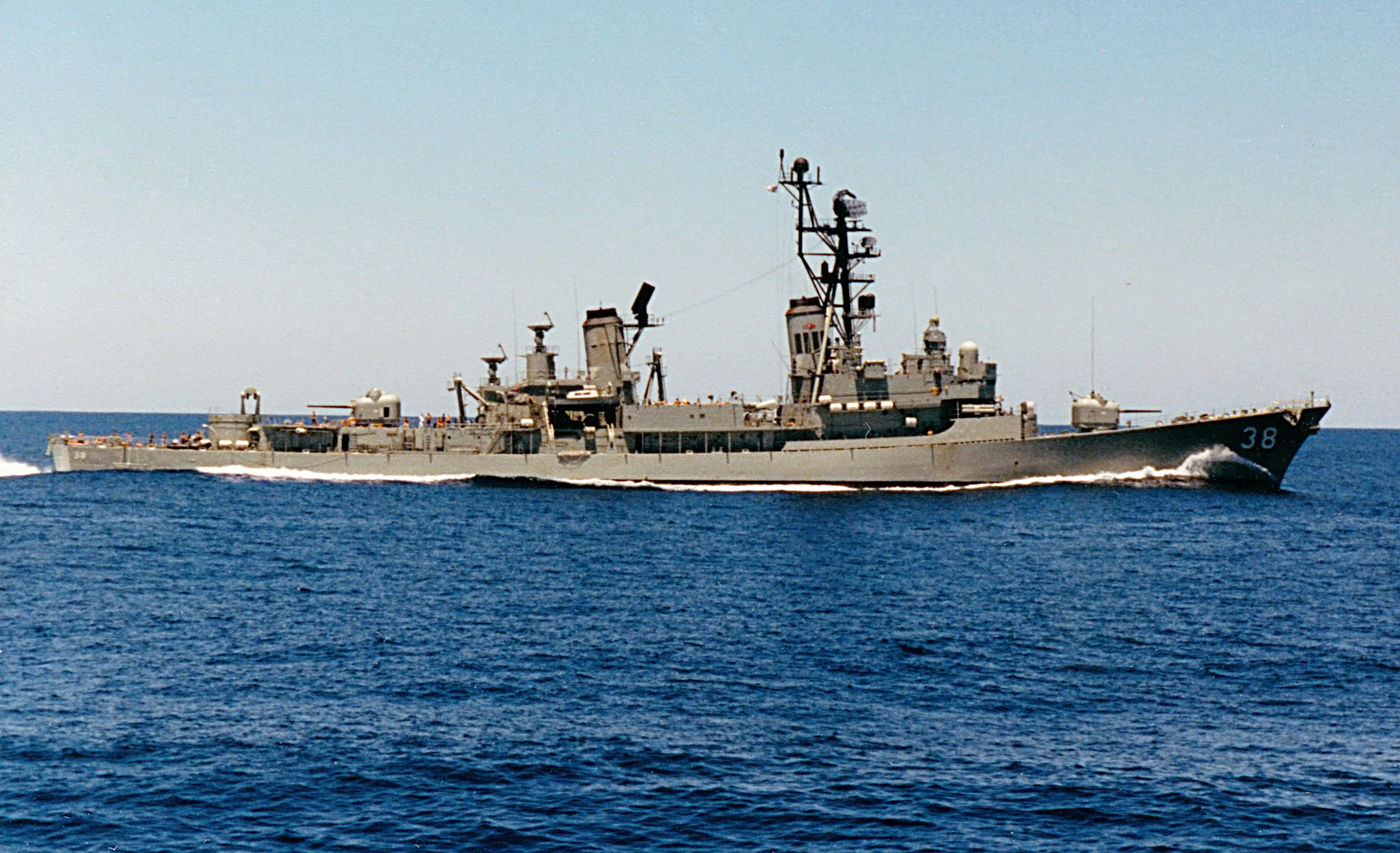
- HMAS Perth at sea in 1980

Class overview
- Name: Perth class
- Builders: Defoe Shipbuilding Company, Bay City, Michigan
- Operators: Royal Australian Navy
- Preceded by: Daring class
- Succeeded by: Hobart class
- Subclasses: Charles F. Adams class (parent)
- In commission: 1965–2001
- Completed: 3
- Preserved: 3 (as dive wrecks)

General characteristics
- Type: Guided missile destroyer
- Displacement: 3,370 tons standard; 4,500 tons full load (at launch); 4,618 tons full load (in 1998)
- Length: 440.8 ft (134.4 m) at waterline; 437 ft (133 m) length overall
- Beam: 47.1 ft (14.4 m)
- Draught: 20.1 ft (6.1 m)
- Propulsion: 4 × Foster Wheeler D-type boilers; 2 × General Electric double reduction steam turbines; 70,000 shp (52,000 kW); 2 shafts
- Speed: 35 knots (65 km/h; 40 mph)
- Range: 6,000 nautical miles (11,000 km; 6,900 mi) at 15 knots (28 km/h; 17 mph); 2,000 nautical miles (3,700 km; 2,300 mi) at 30 knots (56 km/h; 35 mph)
- Complement: 21 officers, 312 sailors (at launch); 25 officers, 285 sailors (in 1998)
- Sensors & processing systems: Hughes SPS-52C air search radar; Norden SPS-40C air search radar; Norden SPS-67V surface search radar; 2 × Raytheon SPG-51G fire control radars (Mark 13 launcher); Western Electric SPG-53F fire control radar (5-inch guns); Sangamo SQS-23KL hull-mounted sonar
- Electronic warfare & decoys: 2 × SRBOC Mark 36 units; Nulka decoy launcher; AN/SLQ-25 towed decoy
- Armament: 1 × Mark 13 missile launcher (initially firing Tartar, replaced in mid-late 1970s by Standard, fitted for but not with Harpoon); 2 × 5-inch/54 caliber Mark 42 guns (two single turrets); 2 × Ikara anti-submarine missile launchers (removed 1990–91); 2 × Mark 32 Surface Vessel Torpedo Tube sets (Mark 46 torpedoes); 2 × Vulcan Phalanx CIWS (fitted 1990–91, not permanently carried

The Perth-class destroyers were three modified Charles F. Adams-class guided missile destroyers operated by the Royal Australian Navy (RAN). Ordered from Defoe Shipbuilding Company during 1962 and 1963, HMA Ships Perth, Hobart, and Brisbane were the first guided missile armed warships, and the first naval ships of United States design, to enter service with the RAN. All three ships operated during the Vietnam War, while Brisbane also participated in the Gulf War. The class was decommissioned between 1999 and 2001, with all three vessels later sunk as dive wrecks.

== Design and construction ==
During the late 1950s, the RAN announced a requirement for guided missile-armed warships; along with plans to install guided missiles aboard currently active escort vessels, plans were made to acquire two purpose-built destroyers. Although traditionally, Australian warships were based on British designs, the RAN chose to study the United States Navy's (USN) Charles F. Adams class along with the Royal Navy's County class. The American design was favoured because the Tartar missile carried was seen as the missile body the USN would standardize on for future anti-aircraft (AA) missile development while the British Sea Slug was an interim and dated system. There were risks in operating American-designed vessels for a navy using predominately British-designed ships, however the County-class DDG used much unproven technology and was rather too large to fit a medium navy and the RAN proposed fitting the Tartar to County-class vessels. However, another RAN proposal – to redesign the County class's standard combined steam and gas propulsion system as a purely steam-powered system – was knocked back by the British. The US destroyer was a more proven design which often an essential need for the RAN to have a powerful AA and GP character with the planned phase out of HMAS Melbourne as a strike carrier in 1963.

In 1960, the decision was made to instead acquire Charles F. Adams-class ships, and on 6 January 1962, two destroyers of a slightly modified design were ordered from Defoe Shipbuilding Company of Bay City, Michigan. Plans to refit Tartar missiles to the Battle and Daring classes were later cancelled because of cost, and on 22 January 1963, a third destroyer was ordered from Defoe. The Australian ships were referred to as the Perth class after lead ship HMAS Perth; the other two destroyers were HMA Ships Hobart and Brisbane. Thought was given to acquiring a fourth ship of the class, but this did not go ahead.

At launch, the destroyers had a standard displacement of 3,370 tons, and a full load displacement of 4,500 tons, although by 1998, various modifications and modernisations had increased the ship's full load displacement to 4,618 tons. Each ship was 440.8 feet (134.4 m) long at the waterline, 437 feet (133 m) long overall, had a beam of 47.1 feet (14.4 m), and a draught of 20.1 feet (6.1 m). The propulsion system consisted of four Foster Wheeler D-type boilers connected to two General Electric double reduction steam turbines; these provided 70,000 shaft horsepower (52,000 kW) to the two propeller shafts, allowing them to reach speeds of 35 knots (65 km/h; 40 mph). Maximum range was 6,000 nautical miles (11,000 km; 6,900 mi) at 15 knots (28 km/h; 17 mph), or 2,000 nautical miles (3,700 km; 2,300 mi) at 30 knots (56 km/h; 35 mph). The standard ship's company at launch consisted of 21 officers and 312 sailors.

Construction of lead ship Perth commenced when she was laid down on 21 September 1962. Perth was launched on 26 September 1963, completed on 22 May 1965, and commissioned into the RAN on 17 July 1965. Hobart was laid down a month after Perth on 26 October 1962, with launching on 9 January 1964, and completion on 18 December 1965, two days after she was commissioned into the RAN. Work on Brisbane did not start until 15 February 1965, with the destroyer launched on 5 May 1966, commissioned on 16 December 1967, but not completed until 24 January 1968. Construction and acquisition of the Perth class included many firsts for the RAN: they were the first ships to be armed with guided missiles, the first to be designed and built in the United States, and the first to be launched sideways instead of stern-first. During construction, the ships were respectively identified with the United States Navy hull numbers DDG-25, DDG-26, and DDG-27.

=== Armament and sensors ===
As a guided-missile destroyer, the primary armament of the Perth-class ships at launch was of a Mark 13 missile launcher for Tartar anti-aircraft missiles. This was supplemented by two 5-inch/54 calibre Mark 42 guns in two single turrets, two Ikara anti-submarine missile systems (although the actual launchers were not installed until the late 1960s), and two Mark 32 triple-tube torpedo sets for Mark 46 torpedoes. The main differences between the Perth class and the parent design related to the weapons systems: a large deckhouse was added between the two funnels to house the two Ikara launchers and their magazines, and the Mark 13 single-arm launcher was fitted instead of the Mark 11 twin-arm launcher.

During the ships' careers, the Tartar missiles were replaced by the Standard missile, and the launchers were updated to fire the Harpoon missile, although Harpoon missiles were not carried by the Perths, and the modification was intended as a "for but not with" fitting. During 1990 and 1991, the three ships were modified to carry two Vulcan Phalanx close-in weapons systems; Phalanx units were stored in a common pool, and were only fitted to the ships as required. Around the same time as the Phalanx installation, the Ikara launchers and magazines were removed. As a result, the magazine spaces were converted into accommodation and recreation areas, and the ship's company was reduced from 332 to 310, although the number of officers had increased by this point from 21 to 25.

In 1998, near the end of the ships' careers, the radar suite consisted of a Hughes SPS-52C air search radar, a Norden SPS-40C air search radar, a Norden SPS-67V surface search radar, two Raytheon SPG-51G fire control radars for the Mark 13 launcher, and a Western Electric SPG-53F fire control radar for the 5-inch guns. A Sangamo SQS-23KL hull-mounted sonar was fitted in the bow. Countermeasures included two SRBOC Mark 36 units, a Nulka decoy launcher, and an AN/SLQ-25 towed decoy.

== Operational history ==
Between 1967 and 1971, all three destroyers were rotated through deployments to the Vietnam War: Perth and Hobart deployed three times, while Brisbane only undertook two tours. During these deployments, the destroyers were integrated into the United States Seventh Fleet. The three ships operated primarily in the naval gunfire support role, but also performed screening escort for the American aircraft carriers, and were involved in the Market Time and Sea Dragon operations, both of which aimed to prevent North Vietnamese troop and supply movements by sea. During these deployments, Perth was damaged by North Vietnamese shells in October 1967, and Hobart was accidentally attacked by United States Air Force aircraft in June 1968.

In 1971, all three ships were marked for modernisation, primarily involving updates to the missile and gunnery systems, along with the installation of the Naval Combat Data System (a derivative of the United States Navy's Naval Tactical Data System modified for the Perths). Hobart was refitted in San Francisco during 1972, but instead of following through on plans to update all three ships in American shipyards, the RAN decided to upgrade the other two destroyers at Garden Island instead to give the dockyard experience in refitting the destroyers.

From 1974 to the start of 1975, Hobart underwent a second modernisation, this time involving the fitting of a new combat system, updates to the radar suite, and modification of the Mark 13 launcher to fire Standard missiles. The same upgrades were made to the other two ships at Garden Island between 1977 and 1979.

During the early-to-mid 1980s, the destroyers, along with Adelaide-class frigates, were regularly deployed to the Indian Ocean. Maintaining a constant naval presence in the Indian Ocean was a response to the Soviet invasion of Afghanistan, along with the growing presence of Soviet warships.

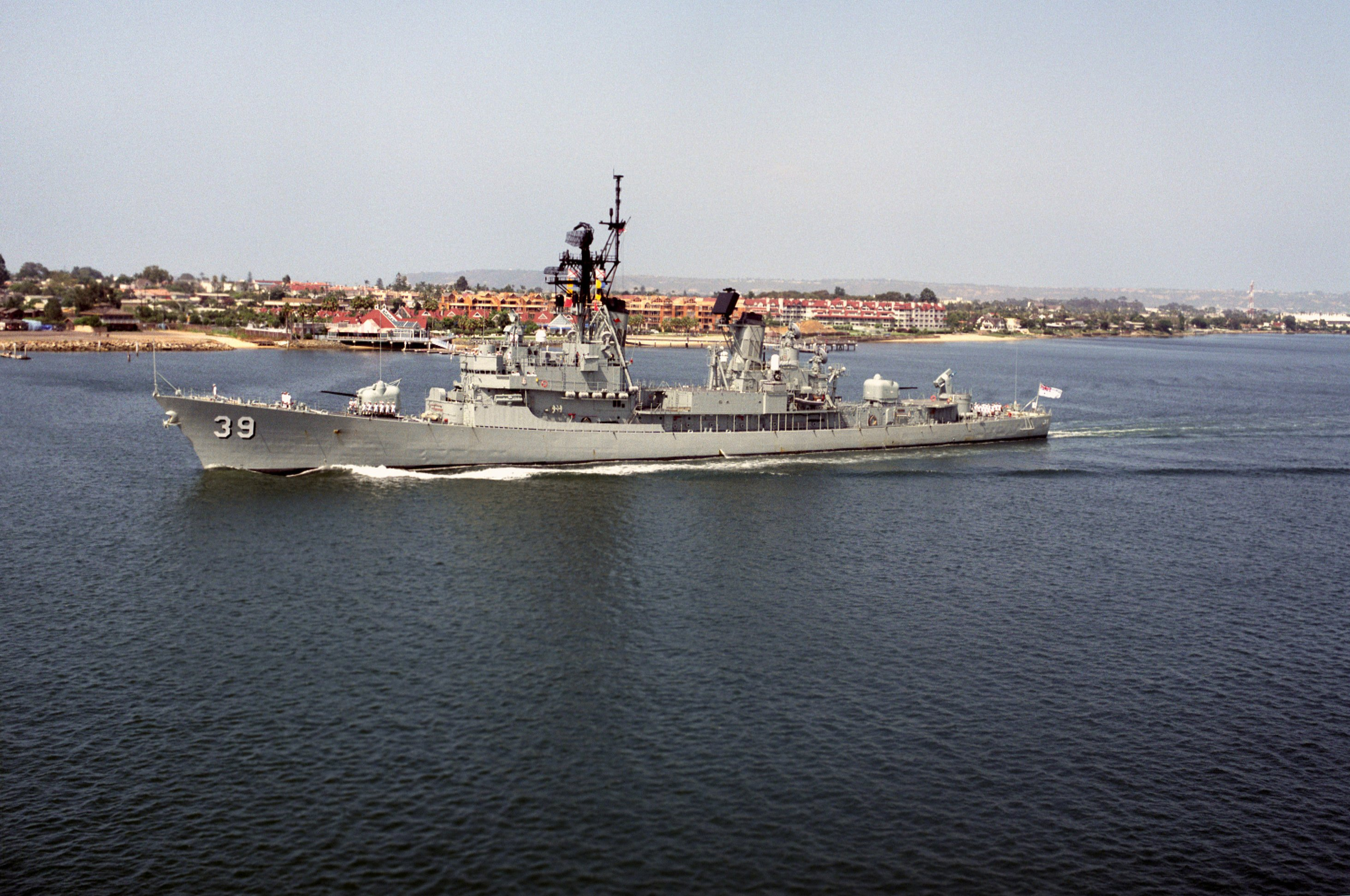
Hobart underway in 1992

The ships were modernised a third time between 1987 and 1991. During this upgrade, the radar and gun systems were updated, and the Mark 13 launcher was modified to fire Harpoon missiles.

Brisbane served as part of the RAN commitment to the Gulf War during 1990 and 1991.

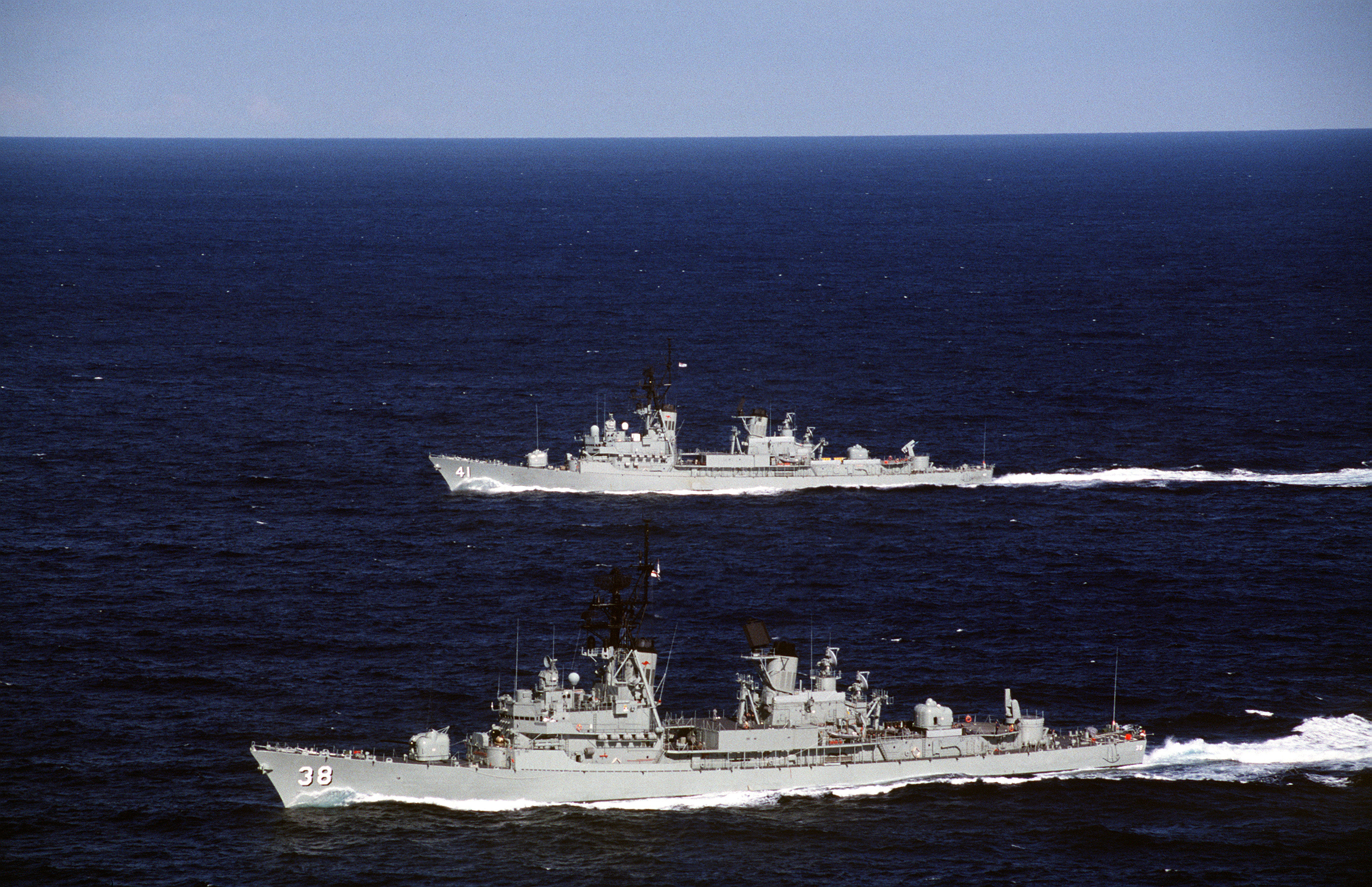
Perth and Brisbane in 1995

In late 1993, USS Goldsborough, a former Charles F. Adams-class destroyer, was acquired by the RAN for use as a parts hulk to support the three Perth-class vessels. After arriving in Sydney in 1994, a four-man team was assigned to identify and remove equipment from the ship. These were primarily used to maintain the three destroyers, although some components were fitted to the Adelaide-class guided missile frigates, or installed at training facilities. While being stripped, the team painted the number 40 on Goldsborough's bow, filling the gap in the pennant number sequence of the Perths. By August 1994, the ship had been stripped of usable equipment, and the hulk was sold to an Indian company for ship breaking.

== Decommissioning and replacement ==
All three ships were decommissioned between 1999 and 2001. Following their withdrawal from service, they were all sunk as dive wrecks in Australian waters: Perth off Albany, Western Australia, Hobart off Yankalilla, South Australia, and Brisbane off Mooloolaba, Queensland. Before being scuttled, Brisbane's bridge and forward 5-inch gun were removed from the destroyer; these were installed at the Australian War Memorial in 2007 as part of the "Conflicts 1945 to Today" gallery.

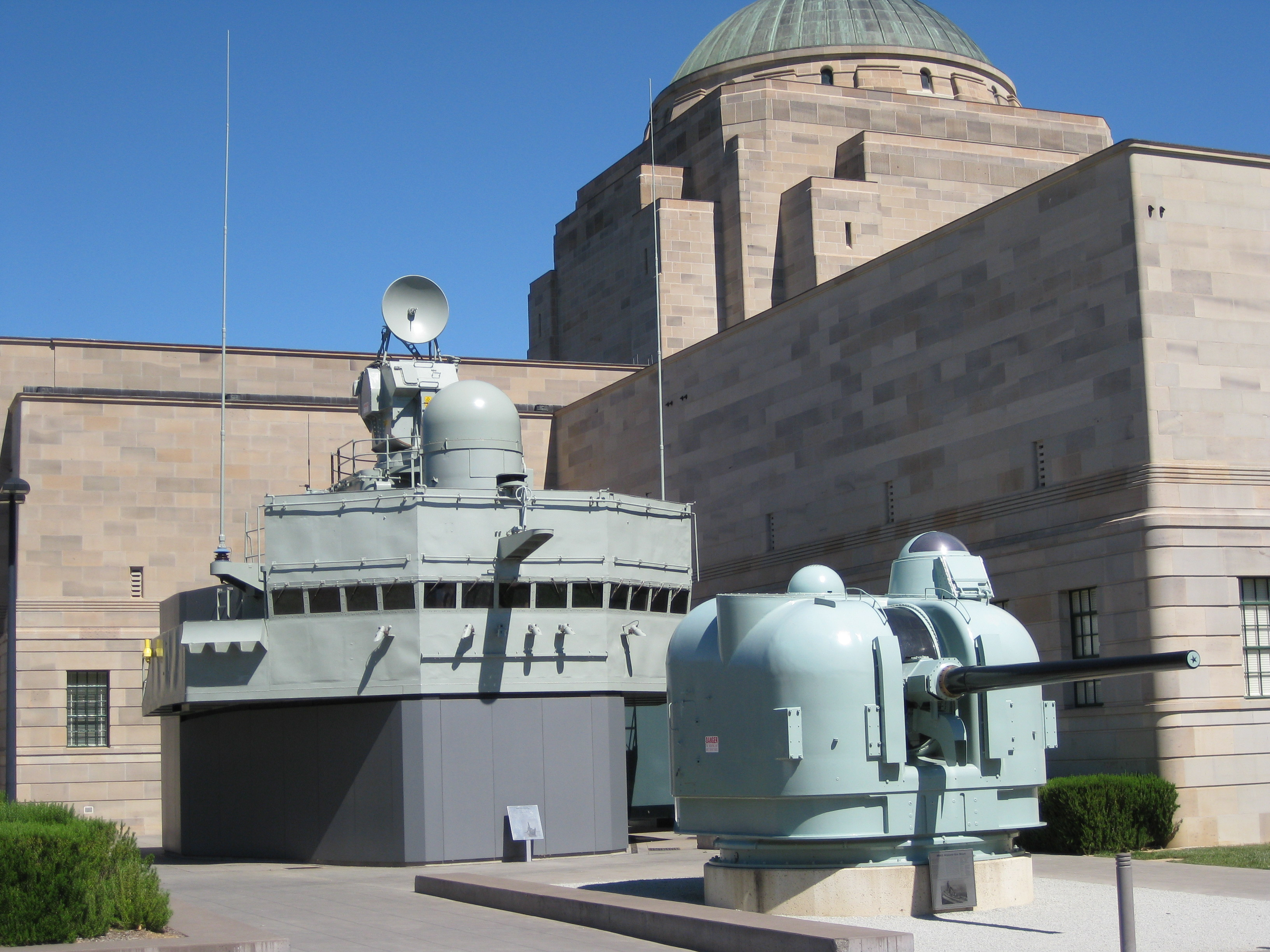
The bridge and forward gun turret of Brisbane on display at the Australian War Memorial

There was no direct replacement of the Perth class following their withdrawal from service, with the area air defence role instead taken by the Adelaide-class guided missile frigates (which at the time, only had the capability to defend themselves, not other ships). Four of the six Adelaide class, were upgraded as a makeshift gap-filler, while the two oldest Adelaides were decommissioned to offset the cost. Fleet anti-air defence remained at a reduced capability until the entry into service of the three Hobart-class air warfare destroyers. HMAS Hobart was commissioned on 23 September 2017.

== Ships ==
Name	Pennant	Builder	Laid down	Launched	Completed	Commissioned	Decommissioned	Fate
Perth	D 38	Defoe Shipbuilding Company, Bay City, Michigan	21 September 1962	28 September 1963	22 May 1965	17 July 1965	15 October 1999	Sunk as dive wreck off the coast of Albany, Western Australia
Hobart	D 39	Defoe Shipbuilding Company, Bay City, Michigan	26 October 1962	9 January 1964	18 December 1965	18 December 1965	12 May 2000	Sunk as dive wreck off the coast of Yankalilla, South Australia
Brisbane	D 41	Defoe Shipbuilding Company, Bay City, Michigan	15 February 1965	5 May 1966	24 January 1968	16 December 1967	19 October 2001	Sunk as dive wreck off the coast of Mooloolaba, Queensland

== See also ==
- List of destroyer classes

Equivalent destroyers of the same era

- Type 82
- Mod Kashin class
- Daegu class
- Minegumo class
- Fante class
