= HMAS Brisbane =

Three ships and a naval base of the Royal Australian Navy have been named HMAS Brisbane after Brisbane, the capital city of Queensland.

- HMAS Brisbane (1915), a Town-class light cruiser launched in 1915 and later decommissioned in 1935.
- HMAS Brisbane (naval base), situated in Brisbane from 1940 to 1942.
- HMAS Brisbane (D 41), a Perth-class guided missile destroyer launched in 1966 and decommissioned in 2001.
- HMAS Brisbane (DDG 41), a Hobart-class air warfare destroyer, commissioned in 2018.

== Battle honours ==
Ships of the name HMAS Brisbane have earned three battle honours.

- Indian Ocean 1917
- Vietnam 1969–71
- Kuwait 1991
