= Charles F. Adams-class destroyer =

Class of guided-missile destroyers

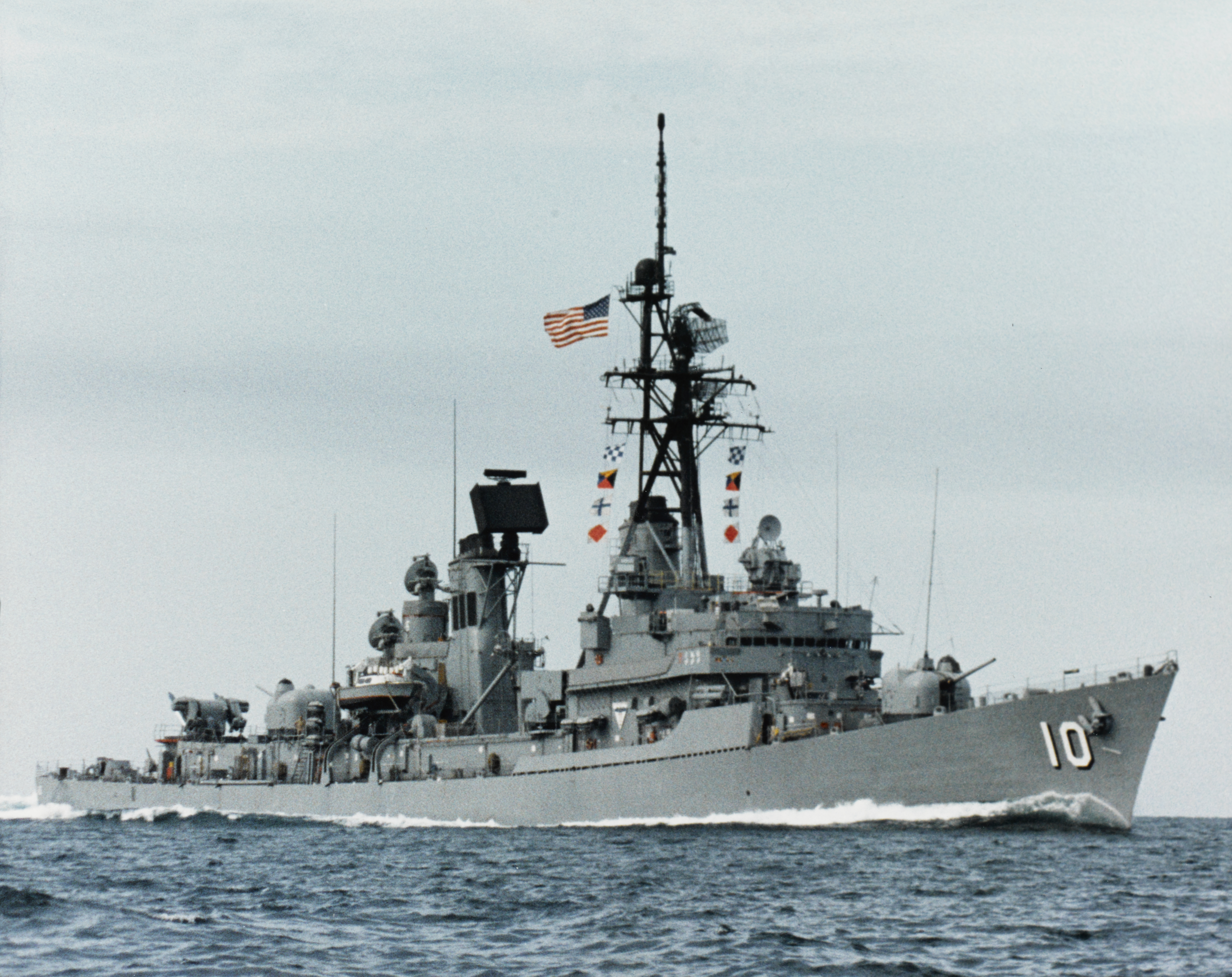
- USS Sampson in late-1980s

Class overview
- Name: Charles F. Adams class
- Builders: Bath Iron Works, ME (7); New York Shipbuilding Corp. NY (6); Defoe Shipbuilding Company, MI (7); Todd Pacific, Seattle, WA (4); Avondale Marine, AL (2); Puget Sound Bridge and Dredging Company, WA (3)
- Operators: United States Navy; Hellenic Navy
- Preceded by: Farragut class
- Succeeded by: Spruance class
- Subclasses: (Australia) Perth class; (West Germany) Lütjens class
- Built: 1958–1967
- In commission: 1960–2003
- Completed: 29
- Retired: 29
- Preserved: Mölders

General characteristics
- Type: Guided-missile destroyer (DDG)
- Displacement: 3,277 tons standard; 4,526 full load
- Length: 437 ft (133 m)
- Beam: 47 ft (14 m)
- Draft: 15 ft (4.6 m)
- Propulsion: 2 × steam turbines providing 70,000 shp (52,000 kW); 2 shafts; 4 × 1,275 psi (8,790 kPa) boilers
- Speed: 33 knots (61 km/h; 38 mph)
- Range: 4,500 nautical miles (8,300 km) at 20 knots (37 km/h)
- Complement: 310–333
- Sensors & processing systems: 1 AN/SPS-10 surface search RADAR; 1 AN/SPS-37 air search radar; 1 AN/SPS-39 air search 3D radar; 2 AN/SPG-51 Tartar fire control radar; 1 AN/SPG-53 gun fire control radar; AN/SQS-23 SONAR
- Armament: 1 Mk 11 missile launcher (DDG-2–14) or Mk 13 single arm missile launcher (DDG-15–24) for RIM-24 Tartar SAM system, or later the RIM-66 Standard (SM-1) and Harpoon anti-ship missile; 2 × 5-inch (127 mm)/54 caliber Mark 42 guns; 1 × RUR-5 ASROC launcher; 2 × Mark 32 Surface Vessel Torpedo Tubes (6 torpedoes)

The Charles F. Adams class is a ship class of 29 guided-missile destroyers (DDG) built between 1958 and 1967. Twenty-three were built for the United States Navy, three for the Royal Australian Navy, and three for the West German Bundesmarine. The design of these ships (known as project SCB 155) was based on that of Forrest Sherman-class destroyers, but the Charles F. Adams class was the first designed to serve as guided-missile destroyers. (Note: The Farragut class was built at roughly the same time, but these ships were classified as frigates until 1975.) nineteen feet (5.8 m) of length was added to the center of the design of the Forrest Sherman class to carry the ASROC launcher. The Charles F. Adams-class ships were the last steam turbine-powered destroyers built for the U.S. Navy. Starting with the succeeding Spruance class, all U.S. Navy destroyers have been powered by gas turbines. Some of the U.S. Charles F. Adams class served during the blockade of Cuba in 1962 and during the Vietnam War; those of the Royal Australian Navy served during the Vietnam War and Gulf War.

== New threat update program and decommissioning ==
Although designed with cutting-edge technology for the 1950s, by the mid-1970s, it was clear to the Navy that the Charles F. Adams-class destroyers were not prepared to deal with modern air attacks and guided missiles. To reduce this vulnerability, the U.S. Navy began the New Threat Upgrade (NTU) program. This consisted of a number of sensor, weapon, and communication upgrades that were intended to extend the service lives of the ships. Under the NTU, these destroyers received improved electronic warfare (EW) capability through the installation of the AN/SLQ-32(V)2 EW suite.

The upgraded combat system would include the MK86 gun fire-control system with AN/SPQ-9 radar, the Hughes AN/SPS-52C 3D radar, the AN/SPG-51C (digital) fire-control radars, and the NEW naval tactical data system. These ships were also planned to have the ability to launch several Harpoon antiship missiles, which were to be installed in their MK-11 or MK-13 Tartar missile launcher.

During the 1980s, the Reagan Administration chose to accelerate production of the Ticonderoga-class guided-missile cruisers and build the Arleigh Burke-class guided-missile destroyers, both classes with the Aegis Combat System that was considered more effective than NTU-upgraded ships, to gradually replace all existing destroyer and cruiser classes (especially the expensive nuclear-powered cruisers). The result of this was that only three of Charles F. Adams-class destroyers, Tattnall, Goldsborough, and Benjamin Stoddert received the full upgrade. Other ships of the class, such as Charles F. Adams, received only partial upgrades, which included the AN/SLQ-32 and Harpoon Missile upgrades, that were intended to extend their service lives until the Arleigh Burke class could reach operational capability.

The U.S. Navy decommissioned its last Charles F. Adams destroyer, Goldsborough, on 29 April 1993. The Australian and German navies decommissioned their last ships of this class by 2003. Four ships of this class were transferred to the Hellenic Navy in 1992, but those have also been decommissioned.

Charles F. Adams was originally planned to open as a museum ship sometime in 2018, but those plans were put on hold and the ship was sent to be scrapped in 2020. The Mölders was made into a museum ship, but all of the other destroyers in the class have been sunk as targets or diving wrecks or sold for scrap.

== Ships in class ==
Ships of the Charles F. Adams destroyer class
Name	Hull no.	Builder	Laid down	Launched	Commissioned	Decommissioned	Fate	Ref
Charles F. Adams	DDG-2	Bath Iron Works	16 June 1958	8 September 1959	10 September 1960	1 August 1990	Scrapped 2020 Brownsville Texas	
John King	DDG-3	Bath Iron Works	25 August 1958	30 January 1960	4 February 1961	30 March 1990	Scrapped	
Lawrence	DDG-4	New York Shipbuilding Corporation	27 October 1958	27 February 1960	6 January 1962	30 March 1990	Scrapped	
Claude V. Ricketts	DDG-5	New York Shipbuilding Corporation	18 May 1959	14 June 1960	5 May 1962	31 October 1989	Scrapped	
Barney	DDG-6	New York Shipbuilding Corporation	10 August 1959	10 December 1960	11 August 1962	17 December 1990	Scrapped	
Henry B. Wilson	DDG-7	Defoe Shipbuilding Company	28 February 1958	22 April 1959	17 December 1960	2 October 1989	Sunk as target	
Lynde McCormick	DDG-8	Defoe Shipbuilding Company	4 April 1958	28 July 1959	3 June 1961	1 October 1991	Sunk as target	
Towers	DDG-9	Todd Pacific Shipyards, Seattle, Washington	1 April 1958	23 April 1959	6 June 1961	1 October 1990	Sunk as target	
Sampson	DDG-10	Bath Iron Works	2 March 1959	21 May 1960	24 June 1961	24 June 1991	Scrapped	
Sellers	DDG-11	Bath Iron Works	3 August 1959	9 September 1960	28 October 1961	31 October 1989	Scrapped	
Robison	DDG-12	Defoe Shipbuilding Company	28 April 1959	27 April 1960	9 December 1961	1 October 1991	Scrapped	
Hoel	DDG-13	Defoe Shipbuilding Company	3 August 1959	4 August 1960	16 June 1962	1 October 1990	Converted to power barge, then scrapped	
Buchanan	DDG-14	Todd-Pacific Shipyards, Seattle, Washington	17 January 1958	11 May 1960	7 February 1962	1 October 1991	Sunk as target	
Berkeley	DDG-15	New York Shipbuilding Corporation	1 June 1960	29 July 1961	15 December 1962	30 September 1992	Sold to Greece as Themistoklis (D221), scrapped later	
Joseph Strauss	DDG-16	New York Shipbuilding Corporation	27 December 1960	9 December 1961	20 April 1963	1 February 1990	Sold to Greece as Formion (D220), scrapped later	
Conyngham	DDG-17	New York Shipbuilding Corporation	1 May 1961	18 May 1962	13 July 1963	30 October 1990	Scrapped	
Semmes	DDG-18	Avondale Shipyard	15 August 1960	20 May 1961	10 December 1962	14 April 1991	Sold to Greece as Kimon (D218), scrapped 2006	
Tattnall	DDG-19	Avondale Shipyard	14 November 1960	26 August 1961	13 April 1963	18 January 1991	Scrapped	
Goldsborough	DDG-20	Puget Sound Bridge and Dredging Company, Seattle, Washington	3 January 1961	15 December 1961	9 November 1963	29 April 1993	Sold to Australia as a parts hulk, scrapped later	
Cochrane	DDG-21	Puget Sound Bridge and Dredging Company, Seattle, Washington	31 July 1961	18 July 1962	21 March 1964	1 October 1990	Scrapped	
Benjamin Stoddert	DDG-22	Puget Sound Bridge and Dredging Company, Seattle, Washington	11 June 1962	8 January 1963	12 September 1964	20 December 1991	Sank while under tow en route for scrapping	
Richard E. Byrd	DDG-23	Todd Pacific Shipyards, Seattle, Washington	12 April 1961	6 February 1962	7 March 1964	27 April 1990	Sold to Greece for parts, sunk as target later	
Waddell	DDG-24	Todd Pacific Shipyards, Seattle, Washington	6 February 1962	26 February 1963	28 August 1964	1 October 1992	Sold to Greece as Nearchos (D219), sunk as target later	

== Hellenic Navy ==
Four destroyers were transferred to the Hellenic Navy;

- Kimon (D218) (formerly USS Semmes)
- Nearchos (D219) (formerly USS Waddell)
- Formion (D220) (formerly USS Joseph Strauss)
- Themistoklis (D221) (formerly USS Berkeley)

== Lütjens class ==
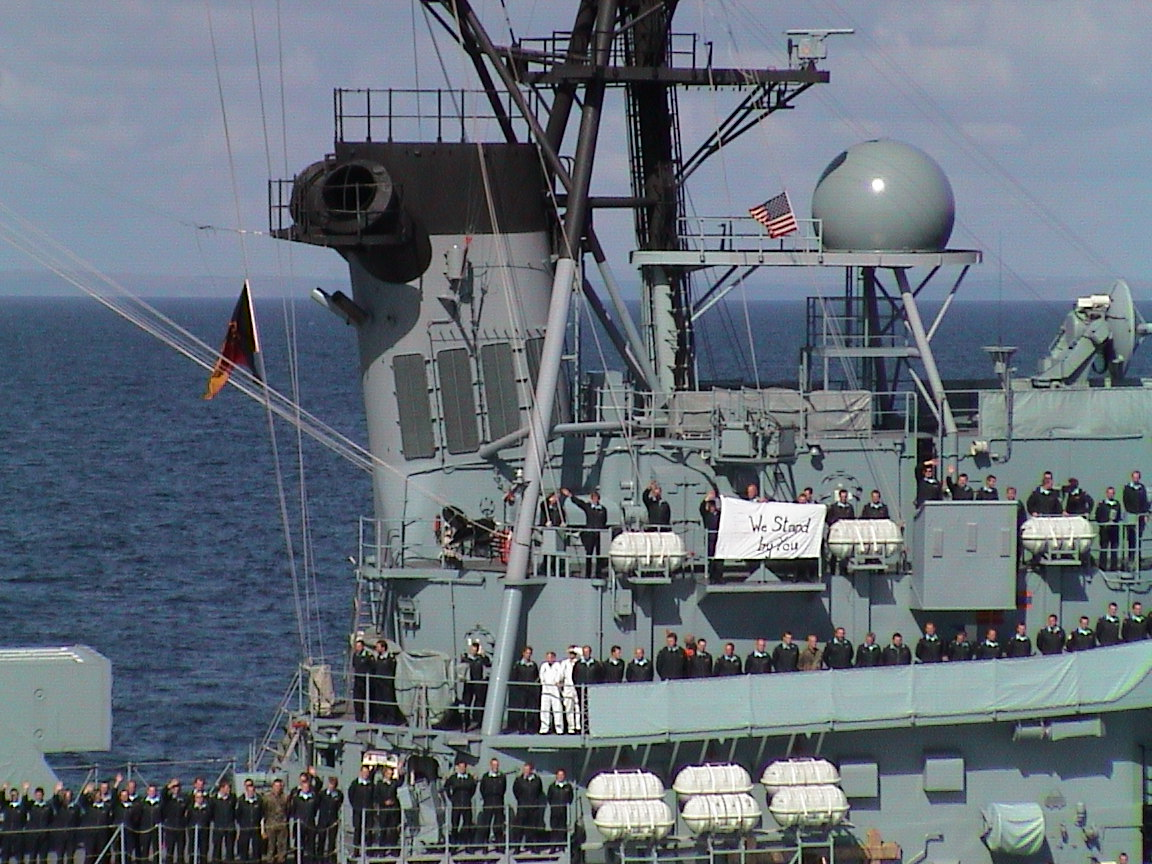
Lütjens rendering honours after the September 11 attacks

The Lütjens-class destroyer was a modification of the Charles F. Adams class for the Bundesmarine (the navy of West Germany). It differed from the Charles F. Adams class in the layout of the crew accommodations, the location of the bow sonar, a second large aerial mast, and different funnels.

- Lütjens (D185) (scrapped)
- Mölders (D186) (Museum ship)
- Rommel (D187) (scrapped)

== Perth class ==
The Royal Australian Navy had three Charles F. Adams-class units constructed to their own specifications (these ships were designated the Perth class). Although broadly similar to the U.S. Navy's vessels, the Australian ships were fitted with the Ikara system instead of the ASROC that was fitted to the American units. The three ships were:

- HMAS Perth (D 38) (sunk as a dive wreck)
- HMAS Hobart (D 39) (sunk as a dive wreck)
- HMAS Brisbane (D 41) (sunk as a dive wreck)

== See also ==
- List of destroyer classes

Equivalent destroyers of the same era

- Kashin class
- Impavido class
- County class
- Yamagumo class
