= HMAS Brisbane (DDG 41) =

Australian air warfare destroyer

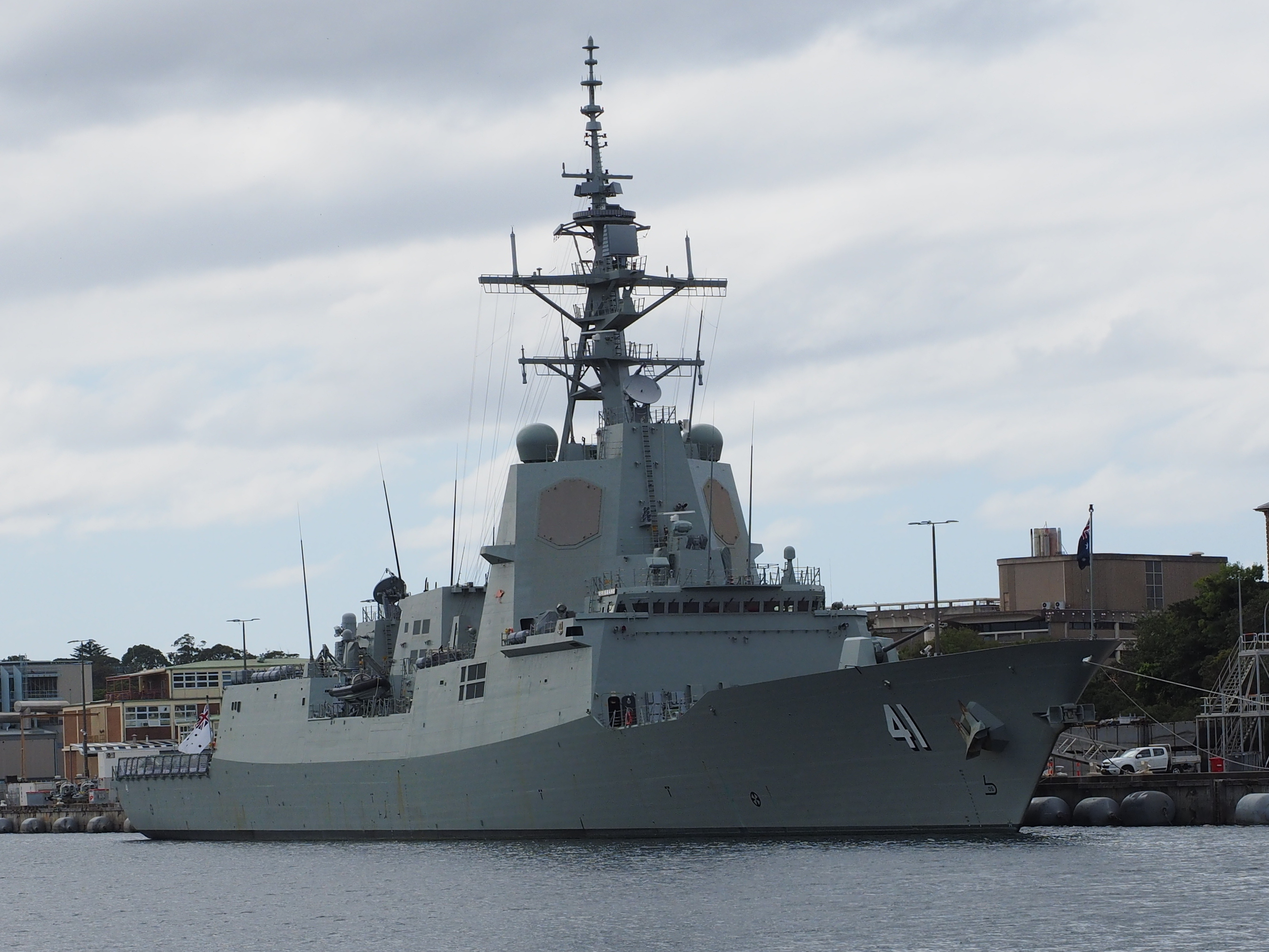
- HMAS Brisbane in April 2019

History

Australia
- Namesake: City of Brisbane, Queensland
- Ordered: 4 October 2007
- Builder: Navantia (designer); AWD Alliance (project coordinator); ASC (primary shipbuilder); Forgacs Group (now Forgacs Marine and Defence) and BAE Systems Australia (module builders), Osborne Naval Shipyard
- Laid down: 3 February 2014
- Launched: 15 December 2016
- Acquired: 27 July 2018
- Commissioned: 27 October 2018
- Home port: Fleet Base East, Sydney
- Identification: MMSI number: 503000122
- Motto: "Aim At Higher Things"
- Nickname(s): The Steel Cat
- Honours and awards: Three inherited battle honours
- Status: Active
- Badge

General characteristics (as designed)
- Class & type: Hobart-class destroyer
- Displacement: 7,000 tonnes (6,900 long tons; 7,700 short tons) full load
- Length: 147.2 m (482 ft 11 in)
- Beam: 18.6 m (61 ft 0 in) maximum
- Draught: 5.17 m (17 ft 0 in)
- Propulsion: Combined diesel or gas (CODOG) arrangement; 2 × General Electric Marine model 7LM2500-SA-MLG38 gas turbines, 17,500 kW (23,500 hp) each; 2 × Caterpillar 3616 diesel engines, 5,650 kW (7,580 hp) each; 2 × controllable pitch propellers
- Speed: Over 28 knots (52 km/h; 32 mph)
- Range: Over 5,000 nautical miles (9,300 km; 5,800 mi) at 18 knots (33 km/h; 21 mph)
- Complement: 186 + 16 aircrew; Accommodation for 234
- Sensors & processing systems: Aegis combat system; Lockheed Martin AN/SPY-1D(V) S-band radar; Northrop Grumman AN/SPQ-9B X-band pulse Doppler horizon search radar; Raytheon Mark 99 fire-control system with two continuous wave illuminating radars; 2 × L-3 Communications SAM Electronics X-band navigation radars; Ultra Electronics Sonar Systems' Integrated Sonar System; Ultra Electronics Series 2500 electro-optical director; Sagem VAMPIR IR search and track system; Rafael Toplite stabilised target acquisition sights
- Electronic warfare & decoys: ITT EDO Reconnaissance and Surveillance Systems ES-3701 ESM radar; SwRI MBS-567A communications ESM system; Ultra Electronics Avalon Systems multi-purpose digital receiver; Jenkins Engineering Defence Systems low-band receiver; 4 × Nulka decoy launchers; 4 × 6-tube multi-purpose decoy launchers
- Armament: Missiles: 48-cell Mark 41 Vertical Launch System firing: RIM-66 Standard 2 missile; RIM-162 Evolved Sea Sparrow missile; 2 × 4-canister Harpoon missile launchers; Torpedoes: 2 × 2-tube Mark 32 Mod 9 torpedo launchers firing MU90 Impact torpedoes; Guns: 1 × 5"/64 calibre Mark 45 mod 4 main gun; 2 × 25mm M242 Bushmaster Mk 38 mod 2 Typhoon RWS; 1 × 20mm Phalanx CIWS
- Aircraft carried: 1 x MH-60R Seahawk

HMAS Brisbane (DDG 41), named after the city of Brisbane, Queensland, is the second ship of the Hobart-class air warfare destroyers used by the Royal Australian Navy (RAN).

== Construction ==
The ship was built at ASC's shipyard in Osborne, South Australia from modules fabricated by ASC, BAE Systems Australia in Victoria, and Forgacs Group in New South Wales. She was laid down on 3 February 2014 and launched on 15 December 2016.

Brisbane began sea trials in November 2017. She was handed over to the RAN on 27 July 2018.

== Operational service ==
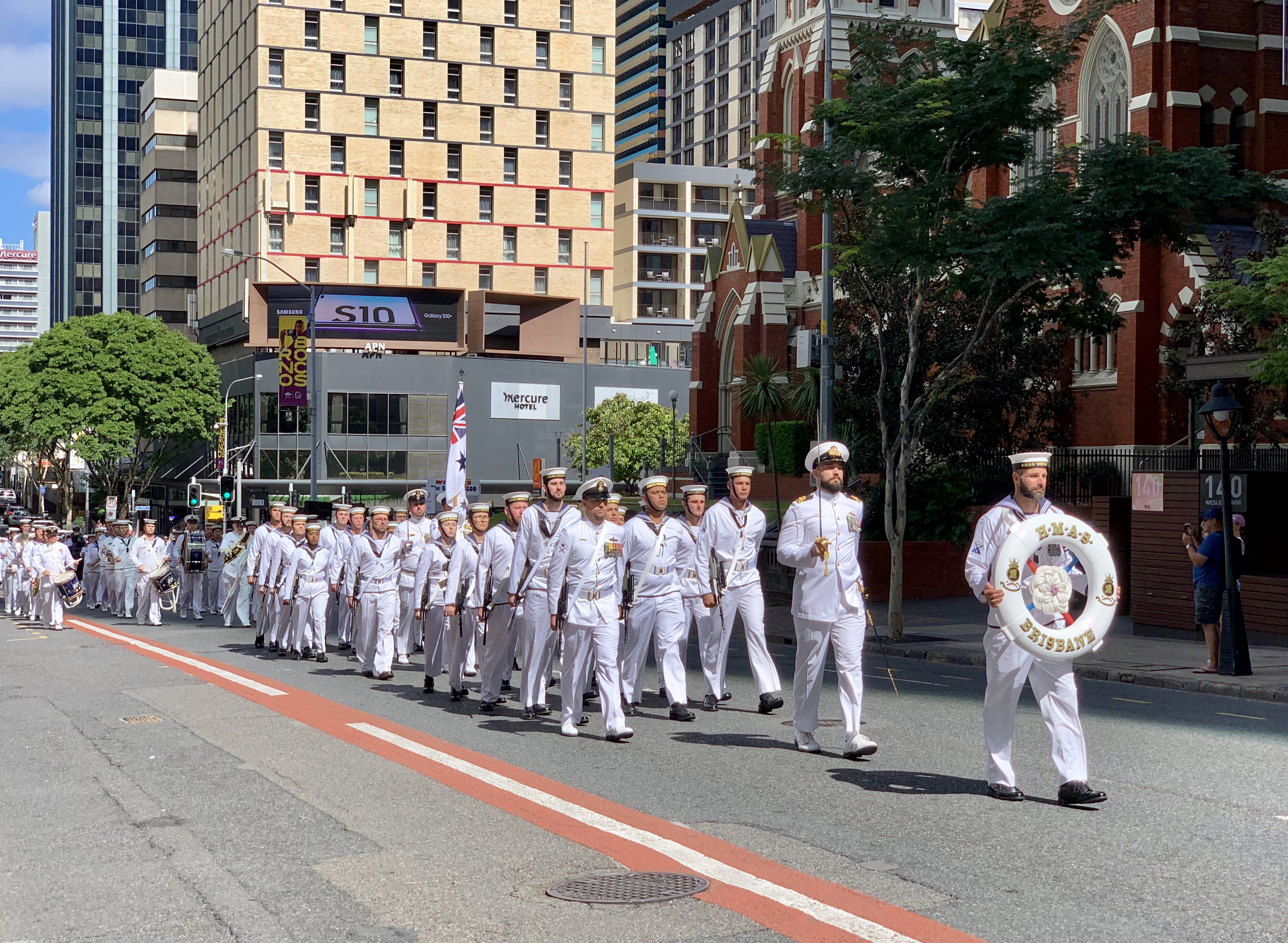
Members of Brisbane's crew parading through Brisbane's CBD in April 2019

Brisbane was commissioned on 27 October 2018. The destroyer completed its weapons trials in March 2019. On 6 April 2019 Brisbane's crew conducted a Freedom of Entry parade through the Brisbane central business district. In September 2019 the ship was deployed to the United States to use US Navy ranges off southern California for combat systems testing.

In October 2021, a MH-60R Seahawk that was operating from Brisbane made an emergency landing into the Philippine Sea shortly after taking off during an exercise. The crew survived and were rescued. A RAAF transport aircraft flew a replacement Seahawk to Japan, and Brisbane docked at Yokosuka to embark it.

On 3 December 2024, Brisbane became the first Royal Australian Navy ship to successfully fire a Tomahawk cruise missile, making Australia the third nation after the United States and United Kingdom to have that capability.

In 2025, Brisbane will be attached to the UK Carrier Strike Group 25 on its Indo-Pacific deployment. The carrier group will also take part in Exercise Talisman Sabre off the Queensland Coast.
