= Operation Sea Dragon =

Part of the Vietnam War (1966–1968)

- Part of the Vietnam War
Date	25 October 1966 – 31 October 1968
Location	Coastal North Vietnam
Result	Disruption of Viet Cong and North Vietnamese supply and communication lines.

Belligerents
United States; Australia	North Vietnam

Operation Sea Dragon was a series of American-led naval operations during the Vietnam War They began in October 1966 to interdict sea lines of communications and supply going south from North Vietnam to South Vietnam, and to destroy land targets with naval gunfire. Sea Dragon assets were a part of Task Force 70.8, whose mission was naval shore bombardment.

The destroyers Mansfield and Hanson of the U.S Navy Seventh Fleet commenced operations on 25 October 1966 off the coast of Quang Tri Province to intercept and destroy waterborne supply craft which were attempting to carry supplies and personnel from North Vietnam to areas south of the Vietnamese Demilitarized Zone (DMZ) in South Vietnam. Although the initial sweep by the two destroyers was unproductive, by February 1967 raids had been conducted as far as 230 miles (370 km) north of the DMZ to the 20th parallel north. At the height of the operation in May 1967, two cruisers and 12 destroyers were assigned Sea Dragon missions. Targets included radar stations, boat repair facilities, bridges, and surface-to-air missile sites. Seventh Fleet calculated that after one year of operations that Sea Dragon had sunk or damaged 2,000 logistics craft.

The Royal Australian Navy destroyers HMAS Perth, HMAS Hobart, HMAS Brisbane and HMAS Vendetta all served with the Sea Dragon force.

During the operation lifetime 29 Sea Dragon ships damaged by shore battery fire with five sailors killed and 26 wounded. In April 1968, the area of operations was reduced to that below the 19th parallel north, only 150 miles (240 km) north of the DMZ. The operation ended on 31 October 1968 when President Lyndon B. Johnson ordered a halt to all attacks on North Vietnam and the Seventh Fleet assets withdrew to south of the DMZ

== See also ==
- Operation Market Time
- Operation Rolling Thunder

== Notes ==
=== Bibliography ===
- Kelley, Michael P. (2002). Where We Were in Vietnam. Hellgate Press, Central Point, Oregon. ISBN 978-1-55571-625-7.
- Polmar, Norman; Marolda, Edward (2015). Naval Air War The Rolling Thunder Campaign. Naval History & Heritage Command. ISBN 978-0-945274-82-7. This article incorporates text from this source, which is in the public domain.
- Tucker, Spencer C., ed. (2000). Encyclopedia of the Vietnam War. New York, New York: Oxford University Press. ISBN 0-19-513524-5.
