= RIM-24 Tartar =

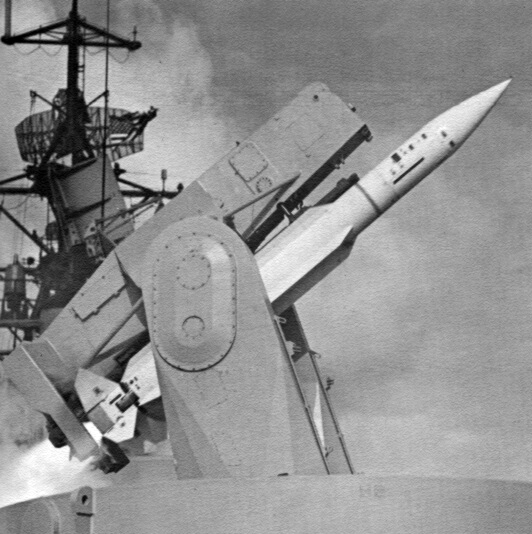
- RIM-24 on USS Berkeley in 1970
- Type: Medium range surface-to-air missile
- Place of origin: United States

Service history
- In service: 1958
- Used by: United States Navy, Australia, Germany

Production history
- Manufacturer: General Dynamics (Convair)

Specifications
- Mass: 1,200 lb (540 kg)
- Length: 186 in (470 cm)
- Diameter: 13.5 in (34 cm)
- Warhead: 130 lb (59 kg) continuous-rod
- Engine: Dual thrust, Solid-fuel rocket
- Propellant: Solid Rocket Fuel
- Operational range: 8.7 nmi (16.1 km; 10.0 mi) (RIM-24A); 16 nmi (30 km; 18 mi) (RIM-24B); 17.5 nmi (32.4 km; 20.1 mi) (RIM-24C)
- Flight ceiling: 50,000 ft (15 km) (RIM-24A); 65,000 ft (20 km) (RIM-24B)
- Maximum speed: Mach 1.8
- Guidance system: SARH
- Launch platform: Surface ship

The General Dynamics RIM-24 Tartar was a medium-range naval surface-to-air missile (SAM), among the earliest SAMs to equip United States Navy ships. The Tartar was the third of the so-called "3 Ts", the three primary SAMs the Navy fielded in the 1960s and 1970s, the others being the RIM-2 Terrier and RIM-8 Talos.

== History ==
The Tartar was born of a need for a more lightweight system for smaller ships that could engage targets at very close range. Essentially, the Tartar was simply a RIM-2C Terrier without the secondary booster. The Tartar was never given a SAM-N-x designation and was referred to as Missile Mk 15 until the unified Army-Navy designation system was introduced in 1963.

The Tartar was used on several ships of a variety of sizes. Initially, the Mk 11 twin-arm launcher was used; later ships used the Mk 13 and Mk 22 single-arm launchers. Early versions proved to be unreliable. The Improved Tartar retrofit program upgraded the earlier missiles to the much improved RIM-24C standard. Further development was canceled, and a new missile, the RIM-66 Standard, was designed to replace it. Even after the upgrade to a new missile, ships were still said to be "Tartar ships" because they carried the Tartar Guided Missile Fire Control System.

A dedicated anti-ship version for the Federal German Navy carrying a Bullpup warhead was abandoned when Germany purchased MM38 Exocet instead.

== Development ==
The RIM-24 Tartar missile represented a significant advancement in naval air-defense systems during the Cold War era. Introduced in 1958, the Tartar was developed as a single-stage, short-to-medium range surface-to-air missile, evolving from its precursor, the RIM-2 Terrier shipboard missile. The Tartar was designed to engage airborne threats and provide a robust defense for smaller naval combat vessels. It also served as a secondary missile system on larger ships, complementing the longer-range capabilities of the Terrier and Talos missiles.

The deployment of the RIM-24 Tartar marked a pivotal point in naval warfare, as it enhanced the fleet's air defense autonomy. Ships outfitted with the Tartar missile system gained a significant increase in firepower, allowing them to engage enemy aircraft with greater accuracy and lethality. These ships were colloquially referred to as "Tartar ships," a testament to the missile system's centrality to their defensive arsenal.

The Tartar missile system continued to be a mainstay on numerous naval ships until the late 1960s. During this period, the RIM-24 began to be phased out and replaced by the more advanced RIM-66 Standard Missile, which offered improved range and guidance systems. Despite the transition to newer technologies, the legacy of the Tartar missile persisted, with "Tartar ships" remaining a part of naval vernacular well into the latter part of the 20th century.

The RIM-24 Tartar played a pivotal role in the evolution of the Standard Missile line. Developed by General Dynamics' Pomona Division, the Tartar, alongside the RIM-2 Terrier, emerged directly from the Bumblebee Program, an initiative from the late Second World War aimed at advancing guided weaponry for fleet air defense. The development of the Standard Missile, which began in October 1963, marked a significant shift in naval armaments, signifying a move towards more versatile medium and extended-range variants.

Operational history

As advancements in missile technology progressed, the RIM-24 Tartar system began a systematic phase-out from active deployment. The transition to more sophisticated missile systems was indicative of the natural evolution in naval armaments as new threats and technological capabilities emerged. The last variant in operation was the Improved TARTAR Retrofit (ITR) RIM-24C. This model was primarily utilized for exercise firings, a role it was expected to fulfill until existing stockpiles were exhausted. The cessation of the Tartar's operational status was marked by the introduction of the STANDARD (MR) RIM-66A and RIM-66B missiles, which featured enhanced capabilities and technological refinements over their predecessors.

== Features ==
Guidance and range

The RIM-24 Tartar missile utilized a semiactive homing system for targeting. Uniquely, it had the capability to switch to passive homing in response to jamming signals emitted by the target. This feature enhanced its effectiveness in electronically contested environments. The Tartar had an operational range of approximately 10 miles, making it suitable for short-to-medium-range engagements.

== Variations ==
- RIM-24A: Original missile
- RIM-24B: Improved Tartar
- RIM-24C: Improved Tartar Retrofit (ITR), aka Tartar Reliability Improvement Program (TRIP)

== Ships carrying Tartar fire control systems ==
- Audace-class destroyer (Italy)
- Impavido-class destroyer (Italy)
- Charles F. Adams-class destroyer / Lütjens-class destroyer (Germany) / Perth-class destroyer (Australia)
- Albany-class cruiser
- Mitscher-class destroyer (guided missile modification)
- Forrest Sherman-class destroyer (guided missile modification)
- Brooke-class frigate
- Baleares-class frigate (Spain)
- California-class cruiser
- Virginia-class cruiser
- Kidd-class destroyer
- T 47-class destroyer (guided missile modification)
- Cassard-class frigate
- Tromp-class frigate with Mk 13 missile launcher (retired from service)

== Operators ==
=== Past operators ===
Australia

- Royal Australian Navy

France

- French Navy

Germany

- German Navy

Italy

- Italian Navy

Japan

- Japan Maritime Self-Defense Force

Netherlands

- Royal Netherlands Navy

United States

- United States Navy

== See also ==
Similar missile systems

- M-1 Volna (S-125; SA-N-1 "Goa")
- Seaslug missile
