= Gloucester Cup =

Award

The Gloucester Cup is the common name for three awards of the Australian Defence Force officially called the Duke of Gloucester's Cup, the three awards are presented to the most proficient ship of the Royal Australian Navy (RAN), infantry battalion of the Australian Army, and squadron of the Royal Australian Air Force (RAAF) during the previous year. The awards were created by Prince Henry, Duke of Gloucester in 1946, while he was serving as the Governor-General of Australia, and were first presented in 1947.

== Royal Australian Navy ==
The RAN Gloucester Cup was initially assessed on the gunnery accuracy of RAN ships, based on the number of sleeve targets hit as a proportion of shells fired. This was quickly found to be impractical, and the criteria for the award was changed to "overall proficiency", based on each ship's level of operational efficiency during a calendar year; husbandry and seamanship; supply and administration; officer and sailor training; divisional systems, morale and discipline; and equipment reliability, maintenance and resourcefulness. As well as the silver trophy, a winning ship is allowed to paint a yellow star on the superstructure of the ship, which remains until the Cup is passed to a new winner.

=== Winning ships ===
Royal Australian Navy recipients of the Gloucester Cup
Year	Winner	Class and type	Reference
1947	HMAS Hobart	Leander-class cruiser	
1948	HMAS Shoalhaven	River-class frigate	
1949	HMAS Arunta	Tribal-class destroyer	
1950	HMAS Sydney	Majestic-class aircraft carrier	
1951	HMAS Murchison	River-class frigate	
1952	HMAS Hawkesbury	River-class frigate	
1953	HMAS Australia	County-class cruiser	
1954	HMAS Quadrant	Q-class destroyer	
1955	HMAS Quadrant	Q-class destroyer	
1956	HMAS Queenborough	Q-class destroyer	
1957	HMAS Anzac	Battle-class destroyer	
1958	HMAS Melbourne	Majestic-class aircraft carrier	
1959	HMAS Quickmatch	Q-class destroyer	
1960	HMAS Vampire	Daring-class destroyer	
1961	HMAS Vampire	Daring-class destroyer	
1962	HMAS Melbourne	Majestic-class aircraft carrier	
1963	HMAS Vampire	Daring-class destroyer	
1964	HMAS Vendetta	Daring-class destroyer	
1965	HMAS Sydney	Majestic-class fast troop transport	
1966	HMAS Sydney	Majestic-class fast troop transport	
1967	HMAS Hobart	Perth-class destroyer	
1968	HMAS Stalwart	Destroyer tender	
1969	HMAS Supply	Tide-class replenishment oiler	
1970	HMAS Hobart	Perth-class destroyer	
1971	HMAS Brisbane	Perth-class destroyer	
1972	HMAS Melbourne	Majestic-class aircraft carrier	
1973	HMAS Stuart	River-class destroyer escort	
1974	HMAS Swan	River-class destroyer escort	
1975	HMAS Hobart	Perth-class destroyer	
1976	HMAS Stuart	River-class destroyer escort	
1977	HMAS Onslow	Oberon-class submarine	
1978	HMAS Torrens	River-class destroyer escort	
1979	HMAS Hobart	Perth-class destroyer	
1980	HMAS Brisbane	Perth-class destroyer	
1981	HMAS Perth	Perth-class destroyer	
1982	HMAS Hobart	Perth-class destroyer	
1983	HMAS Stalwart	Destroyer tender	
1984	HMAS Adelaide	Adelaide-class frigate	
1985	HMAS Orion	Oberon-class submarine	
1986	HMAS Sydney	Adelaide-class frigate	
1987	HMAS Jervis Bay	Training ship	
1988	HMAS Hobart	Perth-class destroyer	
1989	HMAS Derwent	River-class destroyer escort	
1990	HMAS Success	Durance-class tanker	
1991	HMAS Darwin	Adelaide-class frigate	
1992	HMAS Hobart	Perth-class destroyer	
1993	HMAS Tobruk	Round Table-class landing ship logistics	
1994	HMAS Hobart and HMAS Darwin	Perth-class destroyer Adelaide-class frigate	
1995	HMAS Darwin	Adelaide-class frigate	
1996	HMAS Brisbane	Perth-class destroyer	
1997	HMAS Canberra	Adelaide-class frigate	
1998	HMAS Adelaide	Adelaide-class frigate	
1999	HMAS Success	Durance-class tanker	
2000	HMAS Arunta	Anzac-class frigate	
2001	HMAS Anzac	Anzac-class frigate	
2002	HMAS Arunta	Anzac-class frigate	
2003	HMAS Kanimbla	Kanimbla-class landing platform amphibious	
2004	HMAS Rankin	Collins-class submarine	
2005	HMAS Sheean	Collins-class submarine	
2006	HMAS Stuart	Anzac-class frigate	
2007	HMAS Rankin	Collins-class submarine	
2008	HMAS Parramatta	Anzac-class frigate	
2009	HMAS Newcastle	Adelaide-class frigate	
2010	HMAS Melbourne	Adelaide-class frigate	
2011	AUSCDT 4	Clearance Diving Team	
2012	HMAS Anzac	Anzac-class frigate	
2013	HMAS Huon	Huon-class minehunter	
2014	HMAS Success	Durance-class tanker	
2015	HMAS Melbourne	Adelaide-class frigate	
2016	HMAS Rankin (SSG 78)	Collins-class submarine	
2017	HS BLUE	Hydrographic Crewing Division	
2018	HMAS Melbourne	Adelaide-class frigate	
2019	HMAS Parramatta	Anzac-class frigate	
2020	HMAS Arunta	Anzac-class frigate	
2021	HMAS Childers	Armidale-class patrolboat	
2022	HMAS Perth	Anzac-class frigate	
2023	HMAS Rankin (SSG 78)	Collins-class submarine	

== Australian Army ==
The regular infantry battalions of the Royal Australian Regiment compete against each other for the Duke of Gloucester's Cup in an annual military skills competition. To compete for the Cup, each infantry battalion sends a team to the Lone Pine Barracks at Singleton. These teams participate in a five-day competition demonstrating their training and endurance, from which the winning battalion is determined. First held in 1947 between the Australian battalions then in Japan as part of the British Commonwealth Occupation Force, the inaugural cup was awarded to 67th Australian Infantry Battalion (now the 3rd Battalion, Royal Australian Regiment). Between 1951 and 1971 the competition was not held due to operational commitments. Competition recommenced on a regular basis between 1972 and 1998; however, was again ceased as a result of operations in East Timor. The competition recommenced in 2003.

=== Winning Battalions ===
Royal Australian Regiment recipient of the Duke of Gloucester Cup
Year earned	Winner	Reference
1946	67th Bn	-
1947	67th Bn	-
1948	3 RAR	-
1949	3 RAR	-
1950	3 RAR	-
1974	6 RAR	-
1975	6 RAR	-
1976	5/7 RAR	-
1977	5/7 RAR	-
1978	6 RAR	-
1979	6 RAR	-
1981	2/4 RAR	-
1982	6 RAR	-
1983	8/9 RAR	‐
1984	6 RAR	-
1985	6 RAR	-
1986	1 RAR	-
1987	1 RAR	-
1988	3 RAR	-
1989	8/9 RAR	-
1990	1 RAR	-
1991	6 RAR	-
1992	6 RAR	-
1993	2/4 RAR	-
1994	1 RAR	-
1995	3 RAR	-
1996	2 RAR	-
1997	1 RAR	-
1998	3 RAR	-
1999	1 RAR	-
2003	1 RAR	-
2004	1 RAR	-
2005	1 RAR	-
2007	2 RAR	-
2008	6 RAR	-
2009	2 RAR	-
2010	3 RAR	-
2011	3 RAR	-
2012	2 RAR	-
2013	2 RAR	-
2014	6 RAR	-
2015	1 RAR	-
2016	3 RAR	-
2017	2 RAR	-
2018	6 RAR	-
2019	2 RAR	-
2020		Not held due to COVID-19.
2021		Not held due to COVID-19.
2022	3 RAR	-
2023	2 RAR	-

== Royal Australian Air Force ==
The RAAF's Gloucester Cup recognises the most proficient flying squadron during a calendar year. The winner is announced at the Air Force Awards night, held in April or May annually. Originally awarded for the most proficient squadron, the basis for the award changed in 1989 and again in 1993 and the Cup is now awarded annually to the most proficient Wing, Squadron or Operational Unit within the RAAF's Air Command.

The selection process considers the unit's achievement of objectives set for the year, initiatives taken to develop proficiency in operations, administration, dress and bearing, and morale.

The most-awarded unit is No. 36 Squadron, with seven Cups. In 1991, No. 2 Airfield Defence Squadron became the first non-flying unit awarded the Cup.

=== Winning squadrons ===
Royal Australian Air Force recipients of the Gloucester Cup
Year earned	Winner	Reference
1947	No. 38 Squadron	-
1948	No. 87 Squadron	
1949	No. 30 Squadron	-
1950	No. 77 Squadron	
1951	No. 1 Squadron	
1952	No. 36 Squadron	
1953	No. 23 Squadron	-
1954	No. 38 Squadron	-
1955	No. 1 Squadron	
1956	No. 10 Squadron	-
1957	No. 11 Squadron	-
1958	No. 11 Squadron	-
1959	No. 1 Squadron	
1960	No. 1 Squadron	
1961	No. 2 Squadron	-
1962	No. 36 Squadron	
1963	No. 79 Squadron	-
1964	No. 79 Squadron	-
1965	No. 5 Squadron	-
1966	No. 2 Squadron	-
1967	No. 35 Squadron	-
1968	No. 9 Squadron	
1969	No. 9 Squadron	
1970	No. 9 Squadron	
1971	No. 2 Squadron	-
1972	No. 75 Squadron	
1973	No. 3 Squadron	
1974	No. 38 Squadron	-
1975	No. 38 Squadron	-
1976	No. 37 Squadron	
1977	No. 11 Squadron	-
1978	No. 12 Squadron	-
1979	No. 6 Squadron	-
1980	No. 5 Squadron	-
1981	No.2 Squadron	-
1982	No. 35 Squadron	-
1983	No. 34 Squadron	
1984	Australian Contingent to the Multinational Force and Observers (Egypt)	-
1985	-	-
1986	No. 9 Squadron	-
1987	No. 38 Squadron	-
1988	No. 10 Squadron	-
1989	No. 36 Squadron	
1990	No. 76 Squadron	-
1991	No. 2 Airfield Defence Squadron	-
1992	No. 492 Squadron	-
1993	No. 486 Squadron	-
1994	No. 82 Wing	
1995	Air Transportable Telecommunications Unit	-
1996	No. 1 Radar Surveillance Unit	-
1997	No. 86 Wing	
1998	No. 1 Squadron	
1999	No. 395 Expeditionary Combat Support Wing	-
2000	No. 36 Squadron	
2001	No. 37 Squadron	
2002	No. 92 Wing	
2003	No. 38 Squadron	-
2004	No. 86 Wing	-
2005	No. 92 Wing	
2006	No. 33 Squadron	
2007	No. 36 Squadron	
2008	No. 75 Squadron	
2009	No. 11 Squadron	
2010	No. 34 Squadron	
2011	No. 37 Squadron	
2012	No. 36 Squadron	
2013	No. 37 Squadron	
2014	No. 36 Squadron	
2015	No. 33 Squadron	
2016	No. 2 Operational Conversion Unit	
2017	No. 1 Squadron	
2018	No. 2 Squadron	
2019	No. 34 Squadron	
2020	-	-
2021	No. 10 Squadron	
2022	-	-
