= HMAS Newcastle =

Adelaide-class frigate

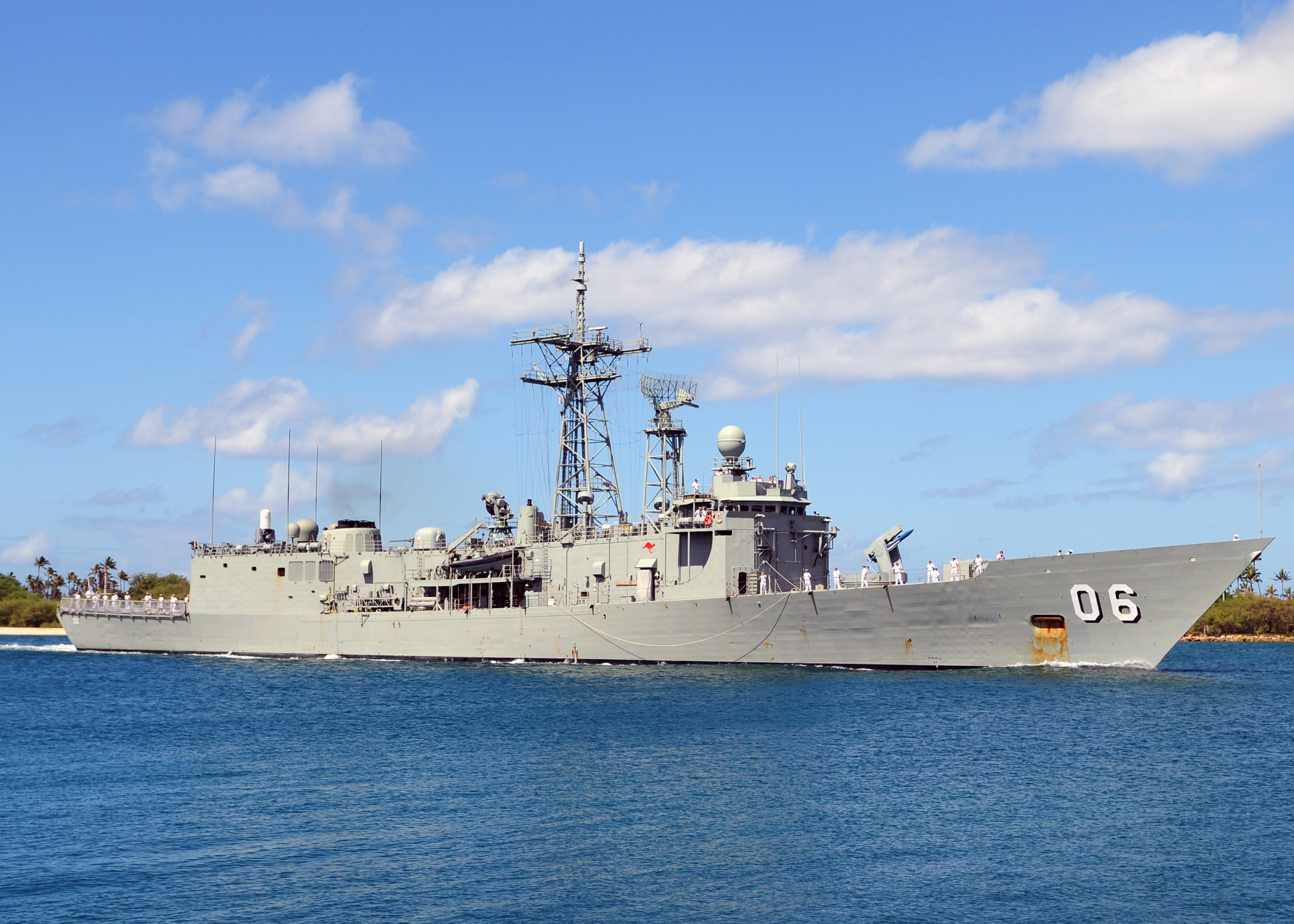
- HMAS Newcastle in 2010

History

Australia
- Name: Newcastle
- Namesake: City of Newcastle
- Builder: Australian Marine Engineering Consolidated
- Laid down: 21 July 1989
- Launched: 21 February 1992
- Commissioned: 11 December 1993
- Decommissioned: 30 June 2019
- Identification: MMSI number: 503108000
- Motto: Enterprise
- Honours and awards: Battle honours: East Timor 1999–2000; Persian Gulf 2002–03; Middle East 2003–13
- Fate: Sold to Chile
- Badge

History

Chile
- Name: Capitán Prat
- Namesake: Arturo Prat
- Commissioned: 15 April 2020

General characteristics
- Class & type: Adelaide-class guided missile frigate
- Displacement: 4,100 tons
- Length: 138.1 m (453 ft) overall
- Beam: 13.7 m (45 ft)
- Draught: 4.5 m (15 ft)
- Propulsion: 2 × General Electric LM2500 gas turbines, 41,000 horsepower (31,000 kW), 1 shaft; 2 × 650-horsepower (480 kW) auxiliary propulsors
- Speed: 29 knots (54 km/h; 33 mph)
- Range: 4,500 nautical miles (8,300 km; 5,200 mi) at 20 knots (37 km/h; 23 mph)
- Complement: 184 (including 15 officers, not including aircrew)
- Sensors & processing systems: AN/SPS-49 air search radar; AN/SPS-55 surface search and navigation radar; AN/SPG-60 Radar fire control radar (Mark 92 fire control system); Mulloka hull-mounted sonar
- Armament: 1 × Mark 13 Missile Launcher for Harpoon and Standard missiles; 1 × 8-cell Mark 41 VLS with Evolved Sea Sparrow missiles; 2 × Mark 32 torpedo tubes; 1 × OTO Melara 76 mm naval gun; 1 × 20 mm Phalanx CIWS; Up to 6 x 12.7-millimetre (0.50 in) machine guns; 2 × M2HB .50 calibre Mini Typhoons (fitted as required)
- Aircraft carried: 2 × S-70B Seahawk or 1 × Seahawk and 1 × AS350B Squirrel (in RAN service)

HMAS Newcastle (FFG 06), named for the city of Newcastle, New South Wales, the largest provincial city in Australia, was an Adelaide-class guided-missile frigate. The last ship of the class to be constructed, Newcastle entered service with the Royal Australian Navy in 1993. During her career, the frigate has operated as part of the INTERFET peacekeeping taskforce, served in the Persian Gulf, and responded to the 2006 Fijian coup d'état. The frigate was decommissioned on 30 June 2019 and transferred to the Chilean Navy on 15 April 2020 and renamed as Capitán Prat (FFG 11).

== Design and construction ==
Following the cancellation of the Australian light destroyer project in 1973, the British Type 42 destroyer and the American Oliver Hazard Perry-class frigate were identified as alternatives to replace the cancelled light destroyers and the Daring-class destroyers. Although the Oliver Hazard Perry class was still at the design stage, the difficulty of fitting the Type 42 with the SM-1 missile, and the success of the Perth-class acquisition (a derivative of the American Charles F. Adams-class destroyer) compared to equivalent British designs led the Australian government to approve the purchase of two US-built Oliver Hazard Perry-class frigates in 1976. A third was ordered in 1977, followed by a fourth, with all four ships integrated into the USN's shipbuilding program. A further two ships (including Newcastle) were ordered in 1980, and were constructed in Australia.

As designed, Newcastle had a full load displacement of 4,100 tons, a length overall of 138.1 metres (453 ft), a beam of 13.7 metres (45 ft), and a draught of 4.5 metres (15 ft). Propulsion machinery consists of two General Electric LM2500 gas turbines, which provide a combined 41,000 horsepower (31,000 kW) to the single propeller shaft. Top speed is 29 knots (54 km/h; 33 mph), with a range of 4,500 nautical miles (8,300 km; 5,200 mi) at 20 knots (37 km/h; 23 mph). Two 650-horsepower (480 kW) electric auxiliary propulsors are used for close manoeuvring, with a top speed of 4 knots (7.4 km/h; 4.6 mph). Standard ship's company is 184, including 15 officers, but excluding the flight crew for the embarked helicopters.

Original armament for the ship consisted of a Mark 13 missile launcher configured to fire RIM-66 Standard and RGM-84 Harpoon missiles, supplemented by an OTO Melara 76-millimetre (3.0 in) gun and a Vulcan Phalanx point-defence system. As part of the mid-2000s FFG Upgrade Project, an eight-cell Mark 41 Vertical Launch System was fitted, with a payload of RIM-162 Evolved Sea Sparrow missiles. For anti-submarine warfare, two Mark 32 torpedo tube sets are fitted; originally firing the Mark 44 torpedo, the Adelaides later carried the Mark 46, then the MU90 Impact following the FFG Upgrade. Up to six 12.7-millimetre (0.50 in) machine guns can be carried for close-in defence, and since 2005, two M2HB .50 calibre machine guns in Mini Typhoon mounts have been installed when needed for Persian Gulf deployments. The sensor suite includes an AN/SPS-49 air search radar, AN/SPS-55 surface search and navigation radar, SPG-60 fire control radar connected to a Mark 92 fire control system, and a Mulloka hull-mounted sonar. Two helicopters can be embarked: either two S-70B Seahawk or one Seahawk and one AS350B Squirrel.

Newcastle was laid down by AMECON at Williamstown, Victoria on 21 July 1989, launched on 21 February 1992 and commissioned into the RAN on 11 December 1993. Unlike the first four Adelaide-class frigates, Newcastle was not constructed in the United States of America, so was never assigned a US Navy hull number. Newcastle is the only Adelaide-class ship not named after a state capital city. Instead, she is named after Newcastle, New South Wales, the largest regional city in the country. She is the first ship of the RAN to be named Newcastle.

== Operational history ==
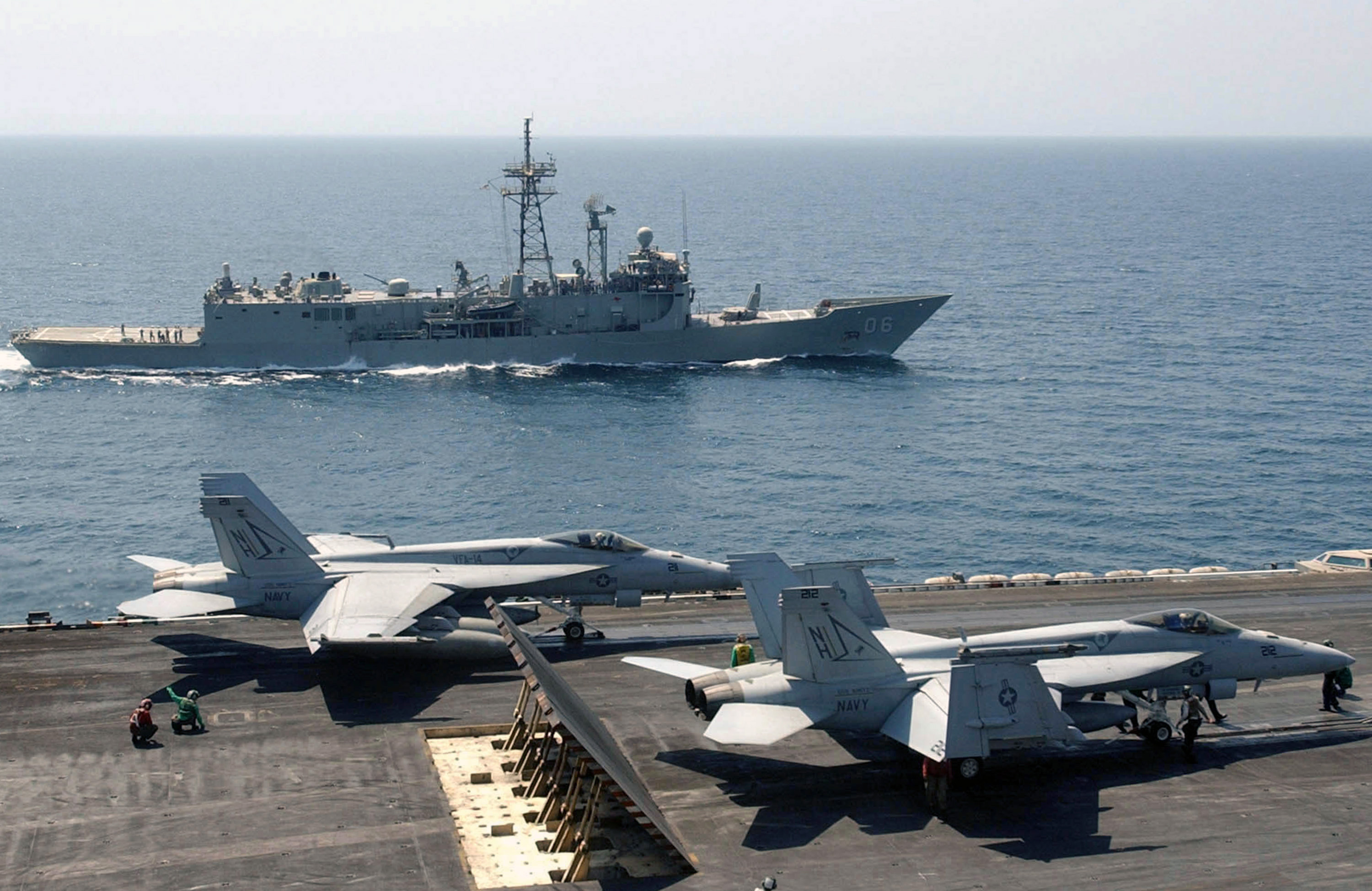
Newcastle operating alongside USS Nimitz in the Persian Gulf in 2005

Newcastle was deployed to East Timor as part of the Australian-led INTERFET peacekeeping taskforce from 19 December 1999 to 26 January 2000.

During 2005, Newcastle was deployed to the Persian Gulf. Newcastle and HMAS Parramatta were the first RAN ships to be fitted with two M2HB .50 calibre machine guns in Mini Typhoon mounts; now a standard theatre fit for all RAN frigates deployed to the Persian Gulf.

At the start of November 2006, Newcastle was one of three Australian warships sent to Fiji during the leadup to the 2006 coup d'état by Fijian military forces against Prime Minister Laisenia Qarase. Newcastle was the first vessel on station, and was later joined by HMAS Kanimbla and HMAS Success. The three vessels were to be used in the event of an evacuation of Australian citizens and nationals. It did not prove necessary to conduct an evacuation and Newcastle returned to Australia in late December 2006.

On the morning of 13 March 2009, Newcastle was one of seventeen warships involved in a ceremonial fleet entry and fleet review in Sydney Harbour, the largest collection of RAN ships since the Australian Bicentenary in 1988. The frigate was one of the thirteen ships involved in the ceremonial entry through Sydney Heads, and anchored in the harbour for the review.

Following an overhaul of the RAN battle honours system, completed in March 2010, Newcastle's service was recognised with two honours: "East Timor 1999–2000" and "Persian Gulf 2002–03". In April 2010, Newcastle was presented with the RAN Gloucester Cup, recognising her as the most efficient ship during 2009. During July and August 2010, Newcastle was one of three RAN ships to participate in the RIMPAC 2010 multinational exercise.

In mid-2016 Newcastle conducted first-of-class flight trials with a ScanEagle unmanned air vehicle (UAV) as part of the development of Navy’s UAV capability. In November that year the frigate sortied from Sydney to intercept a merchant ship off the north coast of New South Wales which was believed to be involved in drug smuggling. In June 2017 it was reported that Newcastle had deployed to the Middle East as part of Operation Manitou on her sixth deployment to the region.

She was decommissioned on 30 June 2019.

On 27 December 2019, it was announced that Newcastle and Melbourne had been sold to Chile.

Newcastle was renamed and commissioned into the Chilean Navy on 15 April 2020 as Capitán Prat, pennant number FFG-11.

== Battle honours ==
Up to 1989, battle honours awarded to ships of the Royal Navy could also be inherited by RAN ships carrying the same name. However, upon the announcement that the final Adelaide-class frigate would be named for Newcastle, a decision was taken that this policy would end and in future RAN ships would receive their own battle honours, ensuring that Newcastle, the first ship in the RAN so named, would not inherit the honours of HMS Newcastle.

- East Timor 1999–2000
- Persian Gulf 2002–2003
- Middle East Area 2005–2014
