= HMAS Melbourne (FFG 05) =

Adelaide-class guided missile frigate of the Royal Australian Navy

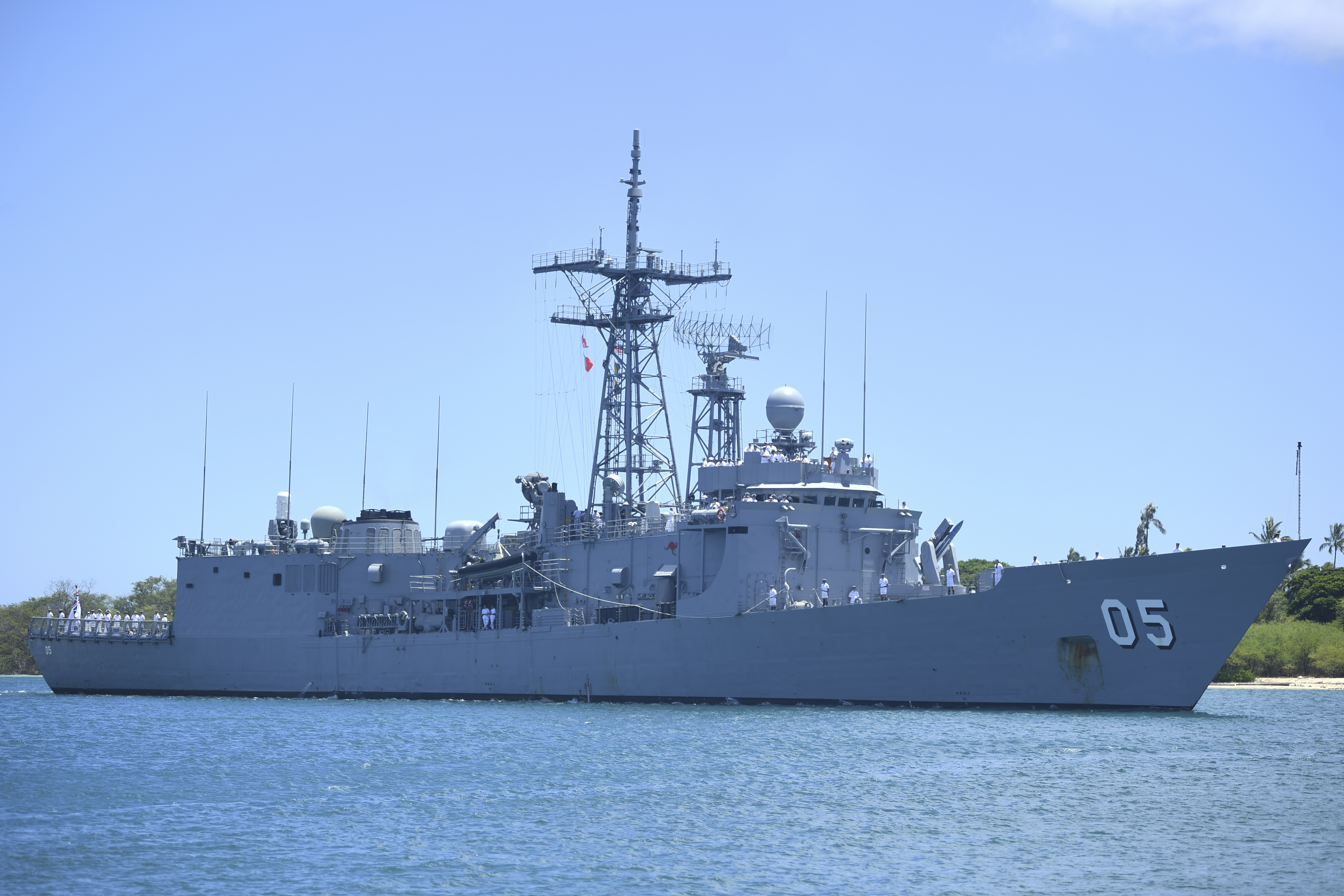
- HMAS Melbourne in June 2018

History

Australia
- Name: Melbourne
- Namesake: City of Melbourne
- Ordered: 1980
- Builder: Australian Marine Engineering Consolidated
- Laid down: 12 July 1985
- Launched: 5 May 1989
- Commissioned: 15 February 1992
- Decommissioned: 26 October 2019
- Identification: MMSI number: 503107000; Callsign: VKLP
- Motto: "Vires Acquirit Eundo" (She gathers strength as she goes)
- Honours and awards: Battle honours: East Timor 2000; Persian Gulf 2002; plus three inherited honours
- Fate: Sold to Chile

History

Chile
- Name: Almirante Latorre
- Namesake: Juan José Latorre
- Commissioned: 15 April 2020

General characteristics
- Class & type: Adelaide-class guided missile frigate
- Displacement: 4,100 tons
- Length: 138.1 m (453 ft) overall
- Beam: 13.7 m (45 ft)
- Draught: 7.5 m (25 ft)
- Propulsion: 2 × General Electric LM2500 gas turbines, 41,000 horsepower (31,000 kW), 1 shaft; 2 × 650-horsepower (480 kW) auxiliary propulsors
- Speed: 29 knots (54 km/h; 33 mph)
- Range: 4,500 nautical miles (8,300 km; 5,200 mi) at 20 knots (37 km/h; 23 mph)
- Complement: 184 (including 15 officers, not including aircrew)
- Sensors & processing systems: AN/SPS-49 air search radar; AN/SPS-55 surface search and navigation radar; SPG-60 fire control radar (Mark 92 fire control system); mulloka hull-mounted sonar
- Armament: 1 × Mark 13 Missile Launcher for Harpoon and Standard missiles; 1 × 8-cell Mark 41 VLS with Evolved Sea Sparrow missiles; 2 × Mark 32 torpedo tubes; 1 × OTO Melara 76 mm naval gun; 1 × 20 mm Phalanx CIWS; Up to 6 x 12.7-millimetre (0.50 in) machine guns; 2 × M2HB .50 calibre Mini Typhoons (fitted as required)
- Aircraft carried: 2 × S-70B Seahawk or 1 × Seahawk and 1 × AS350B Squirrel

HMAS Melbourne (FFG 05) was an Adelaide-class guided-missile frigate of the Royal Australian Navy, which entered service in 1992. Melbourne has been deployed to the Persian Gulf on several occasions, and served as part of the INTERFET peacekeeping taskforce in 2000. On 26 October 2019, Melbourne was decommissioned from the RAN, subsequently being transferred to Chile. The ship was commissioned into the Chilean Navy as Almirante Latorre on 15 April 2020.

== Design and construction ==
Following the cancellation of the Australian light destroyer project in 1973, the British Type 42 destroyer and the American Oliver Hazard Perry-class frigate were identified as alternatives to replace the cancelled light destroyers and the Daring-class destroyers. Although the Oliver Hazard Perry class was still at the design stage, the difficulty of fitting the Type 42 with the SM-1 missile, and the success of the Perth-class acquisition (a derivative of the American Charles F. Adams-class destroyer) compared to equivalent British designs led the Australian government to approve the purchase of two US-built Oliver Hazard Perry-class frigates in 1976. A third was ordered in 1977, followed by a fourth, with all four ships integrated into the USN's shipbuilding program. A further two ships (including Melbourne) were ordered in 1980, and were constructed in Australia.

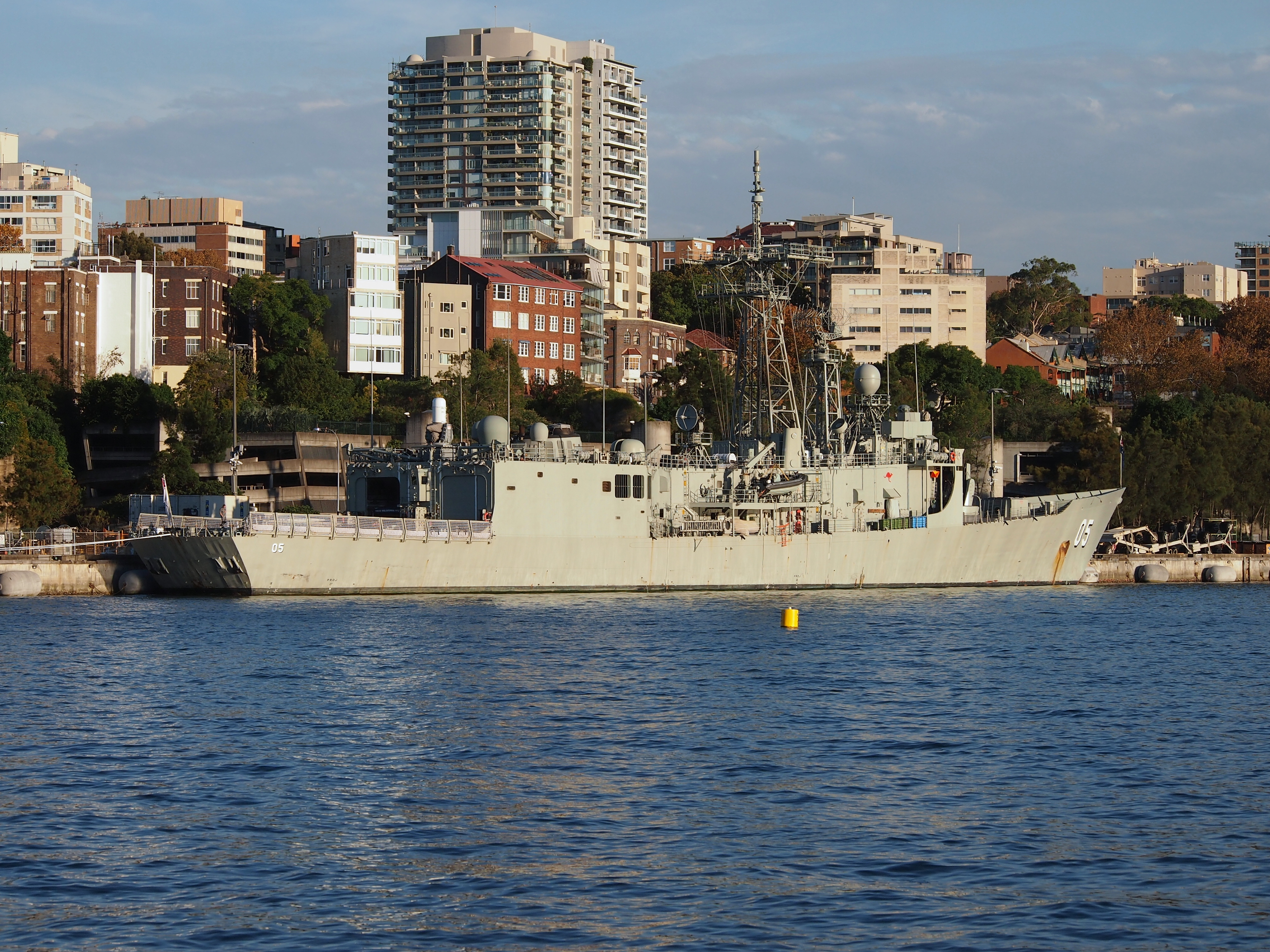
Melbourne in 2013

As designed, the ship had a full load displacement of 4,100 tons, a length overall of 138.1 metres (453 ft), a beam of 13.7 metres (45 ft), and a draught of 6.7 metres (22 ft). Propulsion machinery consists of two General Electric LM2500 gas turbines, which provide a combined 41,000 horsepower (31,000 kW) to the single propeller shaft. Top speed is 29 knots (54 km/h; 33 mph), with a range of 4,500 nautical miles (8,300 km; 5,200 mi) at 20 knots (37 km/h; 23 mph). Two 650-horsepower (480 kW) electric auxiliary propulsors are used for close manoeuvring, with a top speed of 4 knots (7.4 km/h; 4.6 mph). Standard ship's company is 184, including 15 officers, but excluding the flight crew for the embarked helicopters.

Original armament for the ship consisted of a Mark 13 missile launcher configured to fire RIM-66 Standard and RGM-84 Harpoon missiles, supplemented by an OTO Melara 76-millimetre (3.0 in) gun and a Vulcan Phalanx point-defence system. As part of the mid-2000s FFG Upgrade Project, an eight-cell Mark 41 Vertical Launch System was fitted, with a payload of RIM-162 Evolved Sea Sparrow missiles. For anti-submarine warfare, two Mark 32 torpedo tube sets are fitted; originally firing the Mark 44 torpedo, the Adelaides later carried the Mark 46, then the MU90 Impact following the FFG Upgrade. Up to six 12.7-millimetre (0.50 in) machine guns can be carried for close-in defence, and since 2005, two M2HB .50 calibre machine guns in Mini Typhoon mounts have been installed when needed for Persian Gulf deployments. The sensor suite includes an AN/SPS-49 air search radar, AN/SPS-55 surface search and navigation radar, SPG-60 fire control radar connected to a Mark 92 fire control system, and a Mulloka hull-mounted sonar. Two helicopters can be embarked: either two S-70B Seahawk or one Seahawk and one AS350B Squirrel.

The ship was laid down by AMECON at Williamstown, Victoria on 12 July 1985. She was launched on 5 May 1989. Melbourne was commissioned into the RAN on 15 February 1992.

== Operational history ==
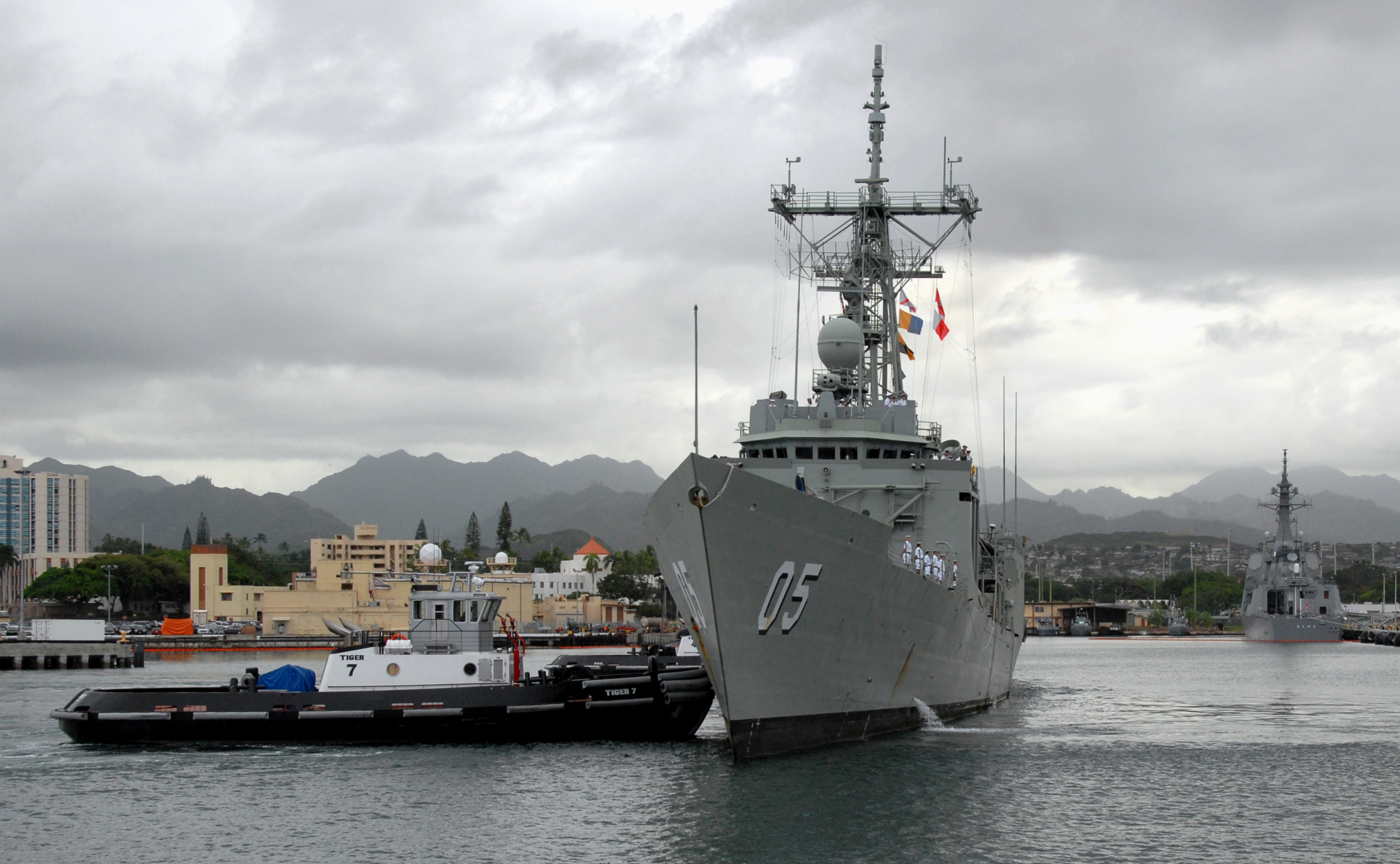
Melbourne arriving at Pearl Harbor, Hawaii in 2009

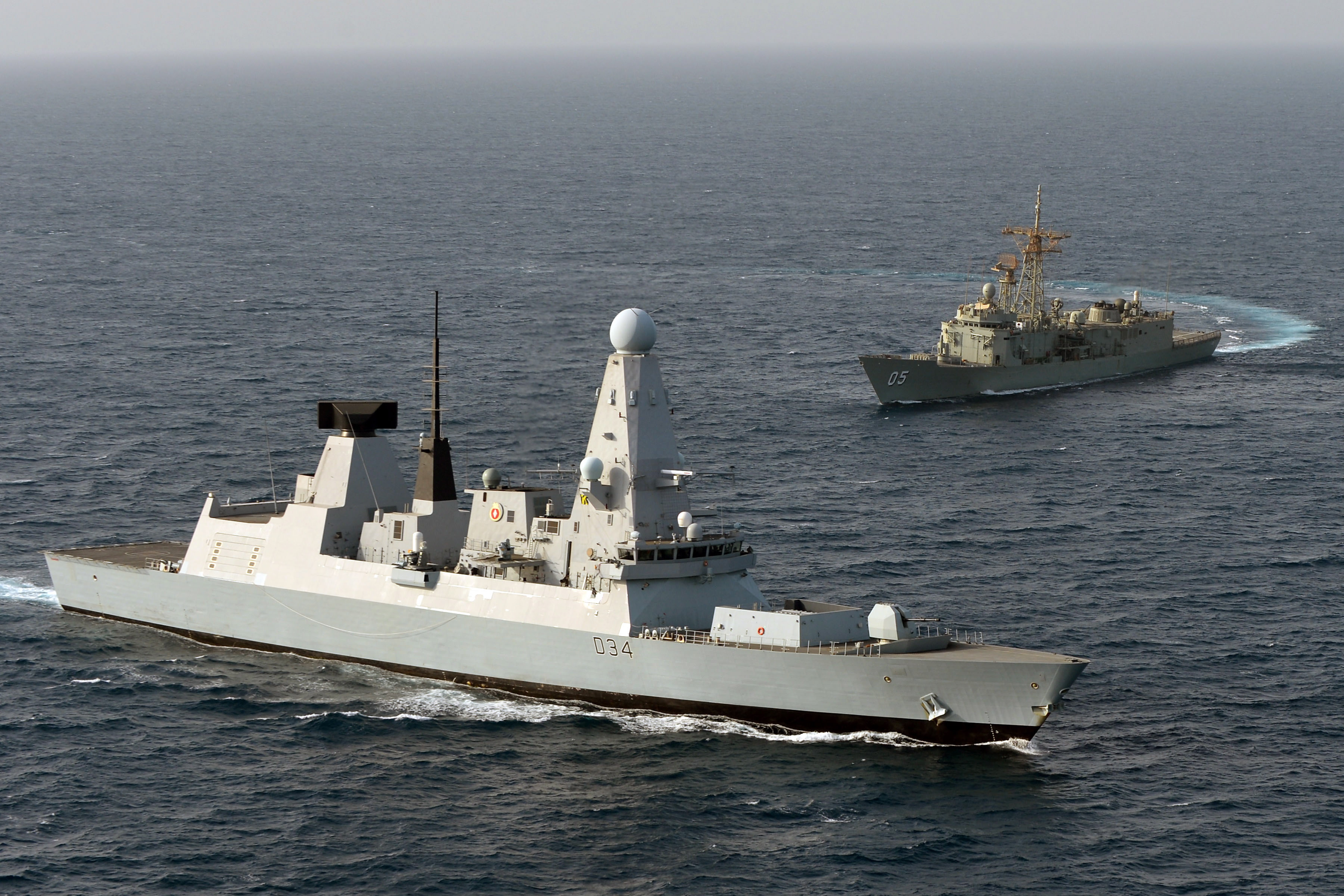
Melbourne operating with HMS Diamond in 2012

In 1996, the frigate was deployed to the Persian Gulf.

Melbourne was deployed to East Timor as part of the Australian-led INTERFET peacekeeping taskforce from 20 January to 23 February 2000.

In 2002, Melbourne participated in the third rotation of RAN ships to the Persian Gulf as part of Operation Slipper, where she enforced United Nations sanctions against Iraq. In 2003, the ship returned to Iraqi waters in support of Operation Catalyst, protecting Iraqi territorial waters following Operation Iraqi Freedom.

Following an overhaul of the RAN battle honours system, completed in March 2010, Melbourne was awarded the honours "East Timor 2000" and "Persian Gulf 2002".

On 16 August 2010, Melbourne was deployed to the Middle East for the third time, again as part of Operation Slipper. During the six-month deployment, the frigate participated in anti-piracy operations in the Arabian Sea and responded to 14 distress calls from merchant vessels, including the British chemical tanker MV CPO China on 3 January 2011. Although it took six hours for Melbourne to close with CPO China, the merchant ship's crew secured themselves in the citadel, and the pirates retreated when the frigate and her Seahawk helicopter arrived. Melbourne returned to Sydney on 18 February 2011.

Between 5 and 7 February 2014, while deployed off Tanzania, Melbourne seized and destroyed 575 kilograms (1,268 lb) of heroin from smuggling vessels. On 18 February, while operating off Oman's Masirah Island, Melbourne and the Pakistani frigate PNS Alamgir intercepted and boarded a dhow found to be carrying 1,951 kilograms (4,301 lb) of cannabis resin. In September 2018 Melbourne operated off the Korean Peninsula to enforce sanctions against North Korea as part of Operation Argos.

Melbourne returned to Fleet Base East from her final deployment on 27 September 2019. She was decommissioned on 26 October 2019.

On 27 December 2019, it was announced that she and Newcastle had been sold to Chile.

Melbourne was commissioned into the Chilean navy on 15 April 2020 as Chilean ship Almirante Latorre, pennant number FFG-14.
