= HMAS Darwin =

Adelaide-class frigate

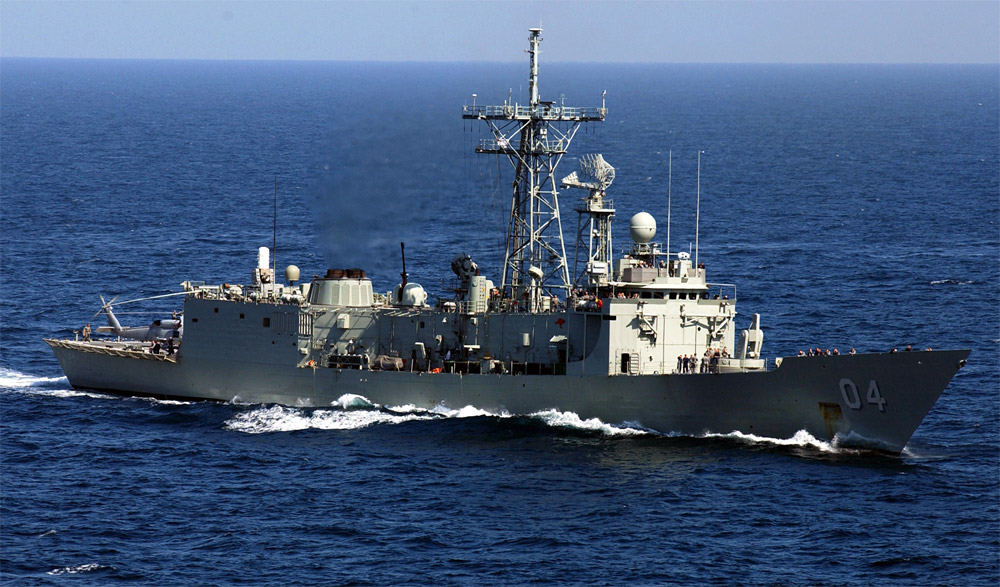
- HMAS Darwin

History

Australia
- Namesake: City of Darwin
- Builder: Todd Pacific Shipyards, Seattle, Washington
- Laid down: 3 July 1981
- Launched: 26 March 1982
- Commissioned: 21 July 1984 Seattle, Washington
- Decommissioned: 9 December 2017 Sydney, Australia
- Identification: MMSI number: 503106000; Callsign: VKDA
- Motto: "Resurgent"
- Nickname(s): FFG-44 (US hull designation during construction)
- Honours and awards: Battle honours: East Timor 1999; Persian Gulf 2002–03; Iraq 2003
- Status: Awaiting disposal
- Badge

General characteristics
- Class & type: Adelaide-class guided missile frigate
- Displacement: 4,100 tons
- Length: 138.1 m (453 ft) overall
- Beam: 13.7 m (45 ft)
- Draught: 7.5 m (25 ft)
- Propulsion: 2 × General Electric LM2500 gas turbines, 41,000 horsepower (31,000 kW), 1 shaft; 2 × 650-horsepower (480 kW) auxiliary propulsors
- Speed: 29 knots (54 km/h; 33 mph)
- Range: 4,500 nautical miles (8,300 km; 5,200 mi) at 20 knots (37 km/h; 23 mph)
- Complement: 184 (including 15 officers, not including aircrew)
- Sensors & processing systems: AN/SPS-49 air search radar; AN/SPS-55 surface search and navigation radar; SPG-60 fire control radar (Mark 92 fire control system); AN/SQS-56 hull-mounted sonar
- Armament: 1 × Mark 13 Missile Launcher for Harpoon and Standard missiles; 1 × 8-cell Mark 41 VLS with Evolved Sea Sparrow missiles; 2 × Mark 32 torpedo tubes; 1 × OTO Melara 76 mm naval gun; 1 × 20 mm Phalanx CIWS; Up to 6 x 12.7-millimetre (0.50 in) machine guns; 2 × M2HB .50 calibre Mini Typhoons (fitted as required)
- Aircraft carried: 2 × S-70B Seahawk or 1 × Seahawk and 1 × AS350B Squirrel

HMAS Darwin (FFG 04), named for the capital city of the Northern Territory, was an Adelaide-class guided-missile frigate, formerly in service with the Royal Australian Navy (RAN). One of four ships ordered from the United States, Darwin entered service in 1984. During her career, she has operated in the Persian Gulf, as part of the INTERFET peacekeeping taskforce, and off the Solomon Islands. The frigate underwent a major upgrade during 2007 and 2008. She was decommissioned on 9 December 2017 and was supposed to be scuttled as a dive wreck in Tasmania, but the deal was pulled by the Tasmanian Government and her fate remains uncertain.

== Design and construction ==
Following the cancellation of the Australian light destroyer project in 1973, the British Type 42 destroyer and the American Oliver Hazard Perry-class frigate were identified as alternatives to replace the cancelled light destroyers and the Daring-class destroyers. Although the Oliver Hazard Perry class was still at the design stage, the difficulty of fitting the Type 42 with the SM-1 missile, and the success of the Perth-class acquisition (a derivative of the American Charles F. Adams-class destroyer) compared to equivalent British designs led the Australian government to approve the purchase of two US-built Oliver Hazard Perry-class frigates in 1976. A third was ordered in 1977, followed by a fourth (Darwin), with all four ships integrated into the USN's shipbuilding program. A further two ships were ordered in 1980, and were constructed in Australia.

As designed, the ship had a full load displacement of 4,100 tons, a length overall of 138.1 metres (453 ft), a beam of 13.7 metres (45 ft), and a draught of 24.5 metres (80 ft). Propulsion machinery consists of two General Electric LM2500 gas turbines, which provide a combined 41,000 horsepower (31,000 kW) to the single propeller shaft. Top speed is 29 knots (54 km/h; 33 mph), with a range of 4,500 nautical miles (8,300 km; 5,200 mi) at 20 knots (37 km/h; 23 mph). Two 650-horsepower (480 kW) electric auxiliary propulsors are used for close manoeuvring, with a top speed of 4 knots (7.4 km/h; 4.6 mph). Standard ship's company is 184, including 15 officers, but excluding the flight crew for the embarked helicopters.

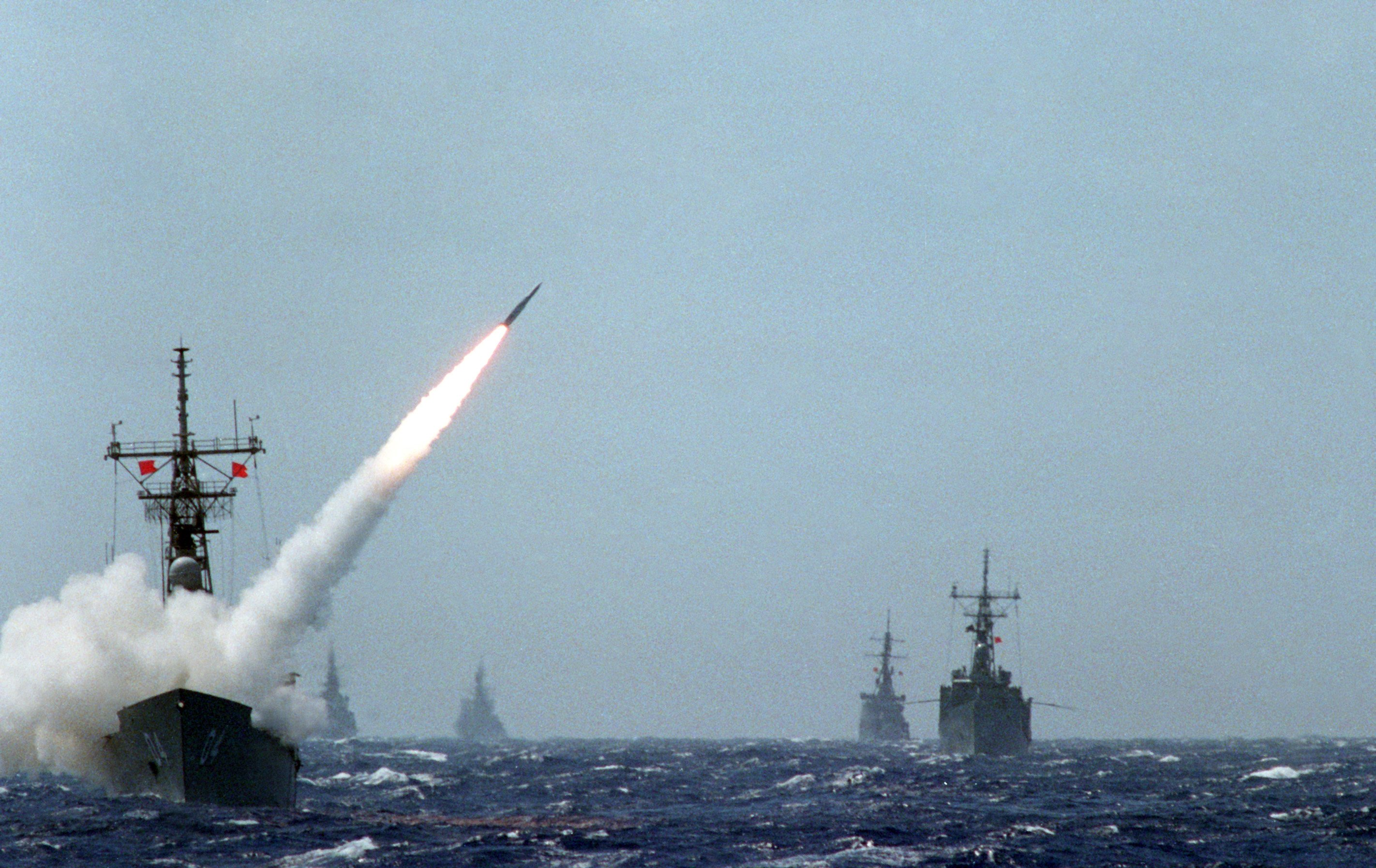
Darwin test-firing a RIM-24 Tartar missile (not part of the ship's regular armament) from her Mark 13 missile launcher during RIMPAC 86

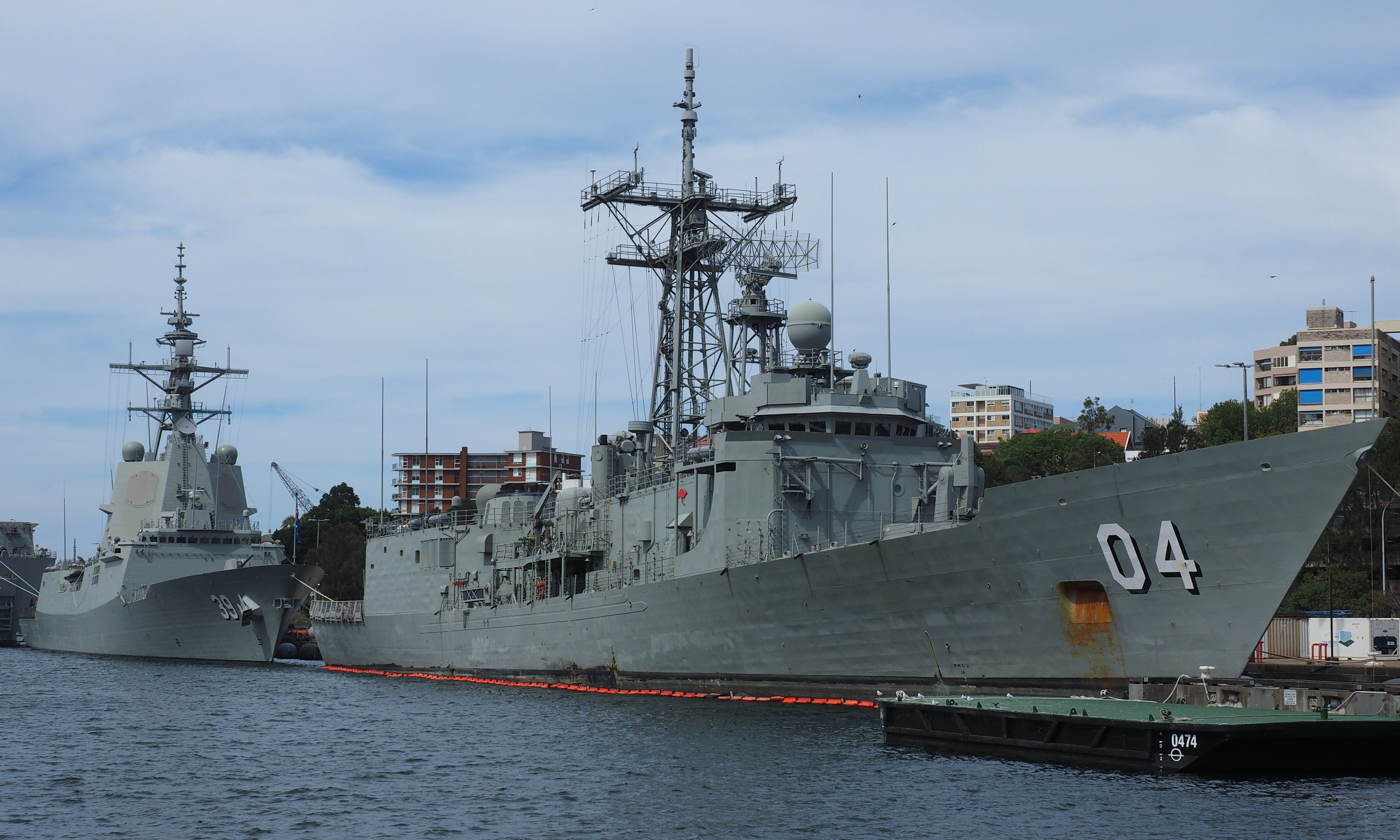
Darwin after her decommissioning; HMAS Hobart is moored behind

Original armament for the ship consisted of a Mark 13 missile launcher configured to fire RIM-66 Standard and RGM-84 Harpoon missiles, supplemented by an OTO Melara 76-millimetre (3.0 in) gun and a Vulcan Phalanx point-defence system. As part of the mid-2000s FFG Upgrade Project, an eight-cell Mark 41 Vertical Launch System was fitted, with a payload of RIM-162 Evolved Sea Sparrow missiles. For anti-submarine warfare, two Mark 32 torpedo tube sets are fitted; originally firing the Mark 44 torpedo, the Adelaides later carried the Mark 46, then the MU90 Impact following the FFG Upgrade. Up to six 12.7-millimetre (0.50 in) machine guns can be carried for close-in defence, and since 2005, two M2HB .50 calibre machine guns in Mini Typhoon mounts have been installed when needed for Persian Gulf deployments. The sensor suite includes an AN/SPS-49 air search radar, AN/SPS-55 surface search and navigation radar, SPG-60 fire control radar connected to a Mark 92 fire control system, and an AN/SQS-56 hull-mounted sonar. Two helicopters can be embarked: either two S-70B Seahawk or one Seahawk and one AS350B Squirrel.

The ship was laid down by Todd Pacific Shipyards at Seattle, Washington on 3 July 1981, to the Perry class Flight III design. The Adelaides were built as part of the United States Navy's construction program, so were assigned USN hull numbers; Darwin was FFG-44. She was launched on 26 March 1982 and commissioned into the RAN on 21 July 1984.

== Operational history ==
During her career, Darwin was deployed to the Persian Gulf on five occasions: during 1990, 1991, 1992, 2002, and 2004.

Darwin was deployed to East Timor as part of the Australian-led INTERFET peacekeeping taskforce from 19 September to 3 November 1999.

From 14 to 18 February 2001 Darwin was berthed in the Mumbai harbour in column RE for the International Fleet Review.

The ship was deployed to the Solomon Islands in 2001.

Darwin underwent a major upgrade and refit at Garden Island during 2007 and 2008, returning to service prior to November 2008.

On the morning of 13 March 2009, Darwin was one of seventeen warships involved in a ceremonial fleet entry and fleet review in Sydney Harbour, the largest collection of RAN ships since the Australian Bicentenary in 1988. The frigate did not participate in the fleet entry, but was anchored in the harbour for the review.

Following an overhaul of the RAN battle honours system, Darwin was granted three battle honours in 2010: "East Timor 1999", "Persian Gulf 2003-03", and "Iraq 2003".

In October 2013, Darwin participated in the International Fleet Review 2013 in Sydney.

April 2014 saw Darwin, as part of Combined Task Force 150, intercept 1,032 kg of heroin on a dhow off the east coast of Africa, followed in July by a further 6,248 kg of hashish on a dhow in the Indian Ocean.

As of 7 January 2016, Darwin has sailed over 1 million nautical miles.

In February 2016, Darwin was one among the 100 ships participating in the International Fleet Review 2016 in Vishakhapattanam.

In March 2016, Darwin intercepted a small, stateless fishing vessel about 170 nautical miles off the coast of Oman. On board they found more than 2,000 pieces of weaponry, including 1,989 AK-47 assault rifles and 100 rocket propelled grenades. According to a U.S. assessment, the weapons were initially sent from Iran and were likely intended for Houthi rebels in Yemen.

In May 2016, Darwin made three seizures of heroin worth $800 million of the coast of Africa.

The Royal New Zealand Navy invited the Royal Australian Navy to send a vessel to participate in their 75th Birthday Celebrations over the weekend of 19–21 November 2016; however, following the Kaikōura earthquake on New Zealand's South Island, Darwin was sent to aide in humanitarian and disaster relief operations.

Darwin was decommissioned in a ceremony held at Garden Island, Sydney on 9 December 2017. She and the other Adelaides were replaced by the Hobart-class destroyers.

== Fate ==
In August 2018, Australian Defense Minister Marise Payne announced that Darwin would be scuttled as a reef in Skeleton Bay, near St Helens, Tasmania. The ship was expected to be scuttled sometime in 2019, but the Tasmanian Government later rejected the proposal citing costs. In response, a new campaign emerged attempting to preserve her as a museum ship. On 21 August 2019, several oil drums under Darwin caught fire at Henderson.
