= HMS Newcastle =

Eight ships of the Royal Navy have borne the name HMS Newcastle, after the English city of Newcastle upon Tyne:

- English ship Newcastle (1653) was a 50-gun fourth-rate ship launched in 1653. She was rebuilt in 1692 and wrecked in 1703.
- HMS Newcastle (1704) was a 54-gun fourth rate launched in 1704, rebuilt in 1733 and broken up in 1746.
- HMS Newcastle (1750) was a 50-gun fourth rate launched in 1750. She foundered in a storm in 1761.
- HMS Newcastle (1813) was a 60-gun fourth rate launched 1813. She was converted to harbour service in 1824 and was sold in 1850.
- HMS Newcastle (1860) was a screw frigate launched in 1860. She was converted into a powder hulk in 1889 and was sold in 1929.
- HMS Newcastle (1909) was a Town-class light cruiser launched in 1909 and sold in 1921, being broken up in 1923.
- HMS Newcastle (C76) was a Town-class light cruiser launched in 1937. She was laid down as HMS Minotaur, but was renamed in 1936. She was broken up in 1958.
- HMS Newcastle (D87) was a Type 42 (Batch 1) destroyer launched in 1975 and decommissioned in 2005 and placed into inactive reserve. She was sold for scrap in 2008.
- HMS Newcastle (Type 26 frigate) will be a Type 26 frigate.

== Battle honours ==
- Porto Farina 1655
- Santa Cruz 1657
- Lowestoft 1665
- Orfordness 1666
- Schooneveld 1673
- Texel 1673
- Marbella 1705
- Sadras 1758
- Negapatam 1758
- Porto Novo 1759
- Spartivento 1940
- Burma 1944–1945
- Korea 1952–1953

== Motto ==
- "Fortitudino Vinco" – (I conquer through strength)

== See also ==
- HMAS Newcastle, an Adelaide-class frigate of the Royal Australian Navy launched in 1992 and decommissioned on 30 June 2019.
