= HMAS Melbourne =

Three ships of the Royal Australian Navy (RAN) have been named HMAS Melbourne, after Melbourne, the capital city of Victoria.

- HMAS Melbourne (1912), a Town-class light cruiser launched in 1912
- HMAS Melbourne (R21), a Majestic-class light aircraft carrier acquired by the RAN in 1947.
- HMAS Melbourne (FFG 05), an Adelaide-class guided missile frigate launched in 1989

== Battle honours ==
- Rabaul, 1914
- North Sea, 1916–18
- Malaysia, 1965–66
- East Timor, 2000
- Persian Gulf, 2002
