= HMAS Stuart (DE 48) =

River-class destroyer escort of Royal Australian Navy

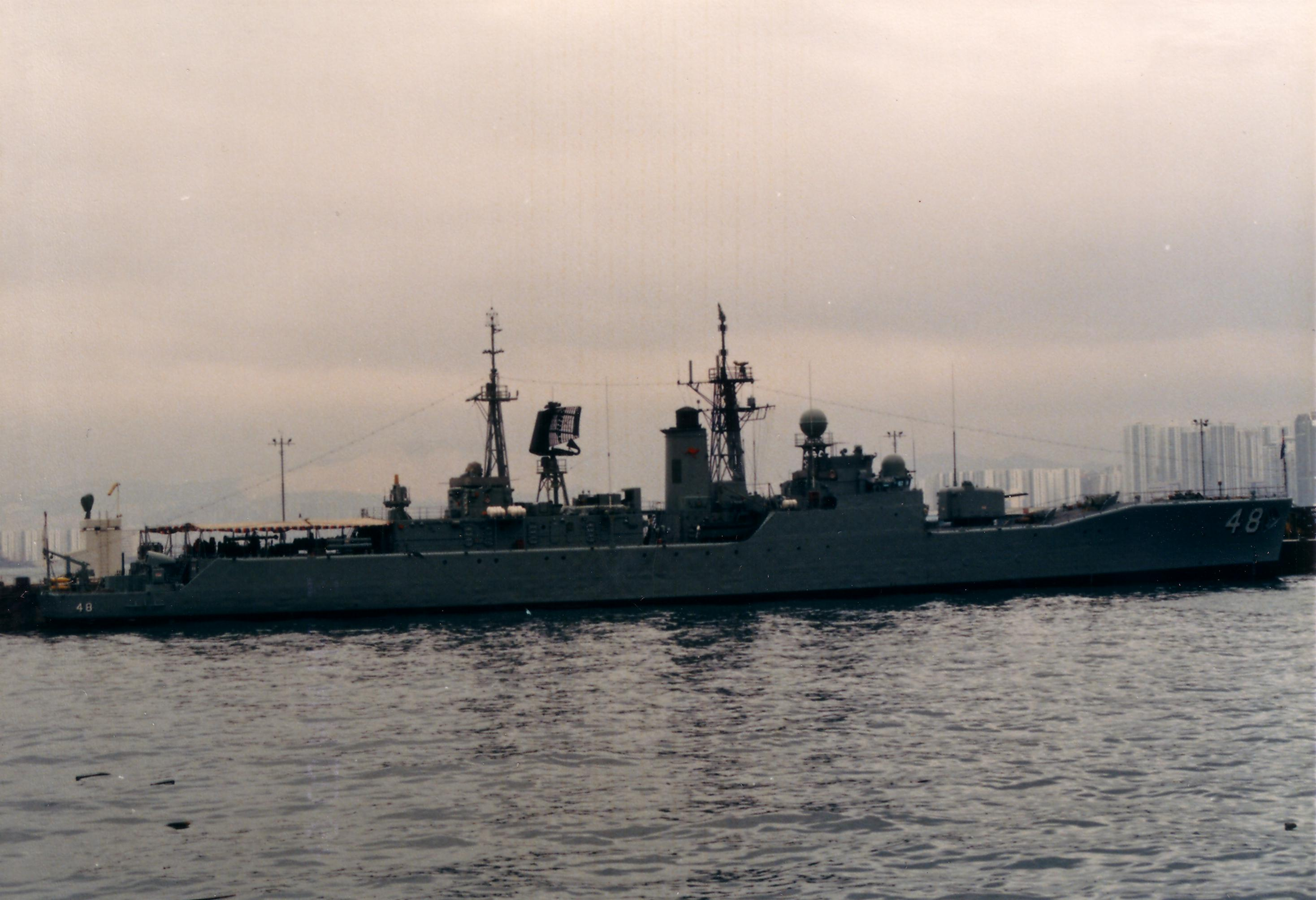
- HMAS Stuart in Hong Kong Harbour in 1989

History

Australia
- Builder: Cockatoo Docks and Engineering Company
- Laid down: 20 March 1959
- Launched: 8 April 1961
- Commissioned: 28 June 1963
- Decommissioned: 26 July 1991
- Motto: "Semper Paratus" (Latin: Always Ready)
- Honours and awards: Eight inherited battle honours
- Fate: Broken up for scrap
- Badge

General characteristics
- Class & type: River-class destroyer escort
- Displacement: 2,750 tons full load
- Length: 112.8 m (370 ft)
- Beam: 12.49 m (41.0 ft)
- Draught: 5.18 m (17.0 ft)
- Propulsion: 2 × English Electric steam turbines; 2 shafts; 30,000 shp total
- Speed: 31.9 knots (59.1 km/h; 36.7 mph)
- Sensors & processing systems: LW02 long range air warning radar; 1979: Mulloka sonar system; SPS-55 surface-search/navigation radar; M22 gun fire control system; ELT-901 Electronic Warfare system
- Armament: 2 × 4.5in Mark 6 guns; 2 × Limbo Mark 10 anti-submarine mortar; 1 × quad Seacat SAM launcher; 1 × Ikara ASW system; 2 × Mark 32 torpedo tubes

HMAS Stuart (F21/DE 48) was one of six River-class destroyer escorts built for the Royal Australian Navy (RAN). The ship was laid down by the Cockatoo Docks and Engineering Company at Cockatoo Island Dockyard in 1959, and commissioned into the RAN in 1963.

During the ship's career, Stuart achieved a number of historical firsts: she was the first RAN ship to fly the Australian White Ensign, and the first major vessel to be homeported at Fleet Base West.

Stuart was paid off in 1991, a year later than originally planned; RAN commitments to the Gulf War saw several warships deployed to the Middle East, and Stuart was retained in service to boost local defence. The destroyer escort was sold for scrapping.

== Construction ==
The first four ships of the River class were based on the Royal Navy's Type 12 frigate, and were intended to close the gap between ships and submarines in regards to anti-submarine warfare, following the rapid improvement of submarines during and after World War II.

Stuart was laid down by Cockatoo Docks and Engineering Company in Sydney on 20 March 1959. She was launched on 8 April 1961 by Bettina Gorton, the wife of future Prime Minister John Gorton, then Minister for the Navy, and was commissioned into the RAN in Sydney on 28 June 1963.

Stuart and the other River-class ships were fitted with the Ikara anti-submarine missile system: the first Australian-designed naval weapons system. Stuart was the first ship to fire an Ikara missile, during trials in August 1963.

== Operational history ==
On 25 December 1966, while operating as part of the Far East Strategic Reserve, Stuart was the first ship to fly the Australian White Ensign. The Australian White Ensign did not officially replace the British White Ensign as the ensign flown by RAN ships until 1 March 1967.

From late 1968 until 1969, Stuart was designated Flagship of the RAN, while the aircraft carrier HMAS Melbourne underwent a major refit.

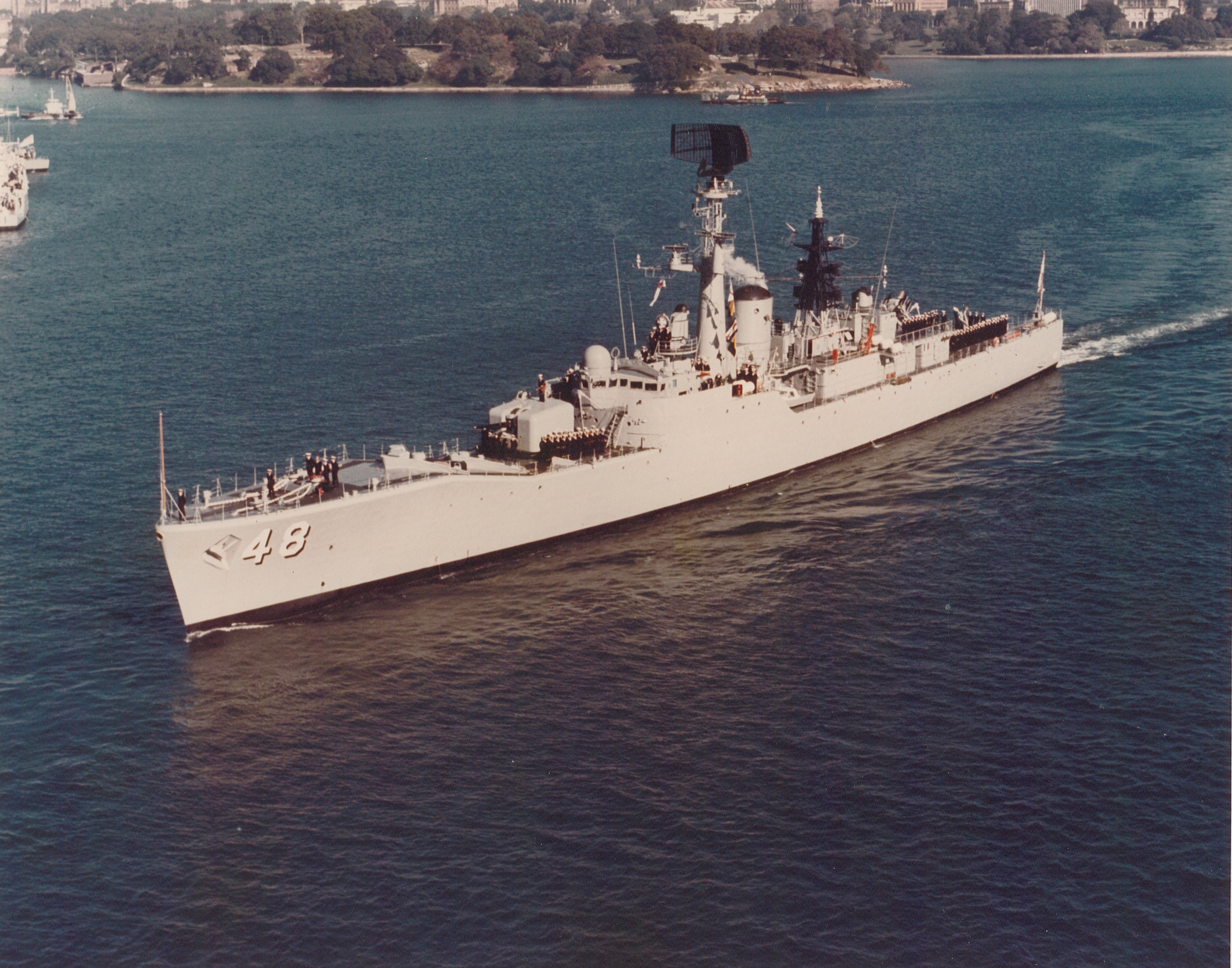
HMAS Stuart in the late 1960s.

During April and May 1970, she carried out escort duties for the Royal Yacht Britannia during the visit to Australia by Queen Elizabeth II and the Duke of Edinburgh.

Following the destruction of Darwin by Cyclone Tracy in December 1974, Stuart was one of thirteen RAN ships deployed as part of the humanitarian aid mission Operation Navy Help Darwin. Stuart sailed from Sydney on 26 December.

Stuart, along with HMA Ships Hobart, Vampire, and Supply, visited the United States in 1976 for the nation's bicentennial celebrations.

In 1979, Stuart entered dock to undergo a half-life modernisation refit valued at A$50 million. This included upgrades to weapons and systems, reinforcement of the hull, and improvements to seakeeping and habitability. The main improvement was the installation of the Australian-developed Mulloka sonar system. Delays and cost increases meant that Stuart did not re-enter service until 1983.

In January 1984, Stuart became the first major RAN warship to be homeported at Fleet Base West in Western Australia. Between May 1984 and September 1986, the ship was deployed to South East Asia three times. A six-month refit began in February 1987, followed by a six-month assignment to the training squadron with HMAS Stalwart and HMAS Jervis Bay. Stuart returned to Western Australia in November 1988.

Stuart was originally intended to leave service in early 1991, but the Iraqi invasion of Kuwait saw Australia commit several Adelaide-class frigates to the United States-led Coalition. Stuart was kept in service and deployed to South-East Asia from February to May 1991 in lieu of the deployed frigates.

== Decommissioning and fate ==
Stuart was paid off on 26 July 1991. She was later sold for scrapping.

Her 4.5-inch Mk V/Mk 6 gun turret is on display at HMAS Stirling in Western Australia.

== Sources ==
- Bastock, John (1975). Australia's Ships of War. Cremorne, NSW: Angus and Robertson. ISBN 0207129274. OCLC 2525523.
- "HMAS Stuart (II)". Royal Australian Navy. Archived from the original on 22 February 2015.
- "Disaster Relief — Cyclone Tracy and Tasman Bridge". Semaphore. 2004 (14, December). Sea Power Centre. 2004. Archived from the original on 13 February 2009.
- Stevens, David, ed. (2001). The Royal Australian Navy. The Australian Centenary History of Defence. Vol. 3. South Melbourne, Victoria: Oxford University Press. ISBN 0-19-555542-2. OCLC 50418095.
  - Cooper, Alastair. "The Era of Forward Defence". In Stevens (2001).
  - Jones, Peter. "Towards Self Reliance; A Period of Change and Uncertainty". In Stevens (2001).
  - Spurling, Kathryn. "The Era of Defence Reform". In Stevens (2001).
- Weaver, Trevor (1994). Q class Destroyers and Frigates of the Royal Australian Navy. Garden Island, NSW: Naval History Society of Australia. ISBN 0-9587456-3-3.
