= Mulloka =

Mulloka was an Australian-designed sonar system installed on ships of the Royal Australian Navy. It was optimised for the warm and shallow waters common off Australia and used a high frequency. The system was developed during the 1970s, with River-class destroyer escort HMAS Yarra being used as the trial ship for Mulloka between 1974 and 1979. These trials ended on 17 August 1979 when the system was accepted for service. Mulloka was subsequently fitted to all the RAN's River-class destroyer escorts along with Adelaide-class frigates HMAS Melbourne (FFG 05) and HMAS Newcastle (FFG 06). It was replaced by an improved variant of the Spherion sonar in use on the Anzac-class frigates as part of the FFG Upgrade program.
