= Australian light destroyer project =

Canceled ship design

- An artist's impression of the light destroyer design as approved by the Government in August 1972

Class overview
- Builders: Williamstown Naval Dockyard (planned)
- Operators: Royal Australian Navy (planned)
- Preceded by: Daring-class destroyer and early River-class destroyer escort
- Succeeded by: Adelaide-class frigate
- Built: 1975–1984 (planned)
- In commission: 1980 (planned)
- Planned: 10 originally, later 3
- Completed: 0

General characteristics
- Type: Light destroyer
- Displacement: 4,200 tons
- Length: 425 ft (129.5 m)
- Beam: 48 ft (14.6 m)
- Propulsion: Two shafts each with one Rolls-Royce Olympus and one Rolls-Royce Tyne gas turbine
- Speed: 30 knots (56 km/h; 35 mph)
- Range: Up to 6,000 mi (9,700 km)
- Complement: 210
- Sensors & processing systems: Automated combat data system
- Armament: One 5"/54 calibre Mark 45 gun; Six Harpoon missiles; Two double-barreled close-range guns; One Mk 13 missile launcher and Standard anti-aircraft missiles; Six anti-submarine torpedoes in two triple tube mounts
- Aircraft carried: Two helicopters
- Aviation facilities: Hangar and stern flight deck
- Notes: Ship characteristics from except where otherwise noted

The Australian light destroyer project aimed to build a class of small destroyers for the Royal Australian Navy (RAN). The project began in 1966 with the goal of developing simple light destroyers (DDL) to support patrol boat operations. The project was rescoped in 1969 when the Navy decided to use the ships to replace other destroyers as they retired, leading to an increase in the design's size and complexity. The construction of three DDLs was approved in 1972. Concerns over the ships' cost and technological risk led the government to cancel the DDL project in 1973 on the RAN's advice, and a variant of the United States' Oliver Hazard Perry-class frigate was procured instead.

== Requirement ==
From 1963 to 1966, RAN warships took part in the Indonesian Confrontation. During this period, Australian minesweepers and frigates patrolled Malaysia's coastline to counter Indonesian infiltration parties travelling in small craft. These ships also bombarded Indonesian positions in East Kalimantan near the border with Malaysia on several occasions. The RAN's experiences during this conflict led it to perceive a need for light destroyers and patrol boats tailored to Confrontation-type tasks.

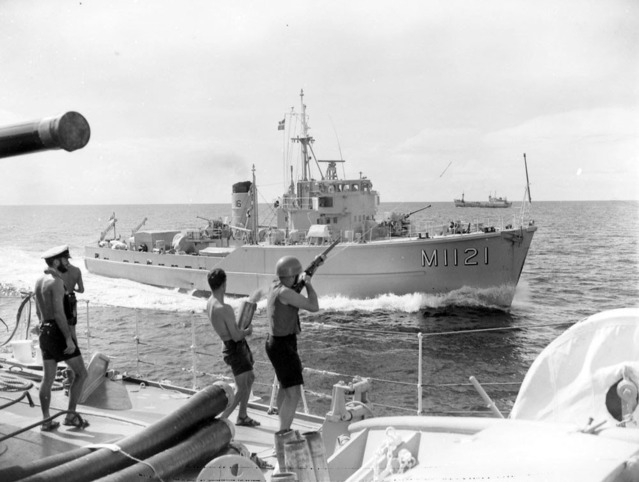
A sailor from the destroyer escort HMAS Derwent firing a line to the minesweeper HMAS Curlew while the ships were operating off Malaysia in February 1965. The initial light destroyer concept was based on the RAN's experiences of operating ships of these types during the Indonesian Confrontation.

When the DDL project began in 1966, the ships' role was to support patrol boats during anti-infiltration operations and complement the Navy's existing destroyer force. The intention was that the DDLs would be fast, simply armed and smaller than conventional destroyers. It was also hoped that a common DDL hull design could developed into variants optimised for different roles. The RAN and British Royal Navy (RN) held discussions in 1967 on jointly developing DDLs, but the RN withdrew from the project when the Australians insisted on arming the ships with United States-designed weapons.

The DDL design evolved during the late 1960s. As a result of planning conducted during 1967 and 1968, it gradually became clear that the ships would replace rather than complement the Navy's three Daring-class destroyers and four early River-class destroyer escorts. Accordingly, the specification for the ships that was adopted in 1969 called for the DDLs to be more capable and flexible than originally conceived. This aimed to allow the RAN to maintain its capabilities as the older destroyers retired. The intended roles for the DDLs' were set in 1970 by an agreement between the RAN and Department of Defence, which specified that the ships were to be capable of destroying equivalent surface warships, carrying out maritime interdiction duties, commanding groups of patrol boats and aircraft, have reasonable anti-aircraft and anti-submarine capabilities and be able to provide naval gunfire support to land forces.

The RAN originally intended to order up to ten DDLs. All the ships were to be built in Australia to maintain local shipbuilding capabilities and Australian industry was to be involved to the greatest possible extent. Production of the ships was to be evenly split between Cockatoo Island Dockyard in Sydney and Williamstown Naval Dockyard in Melbourne.

== Design ==
The DDL design changed considerably over the life of the project. The initial specification was for a 1,000-ton escort vessel and in an early design the class was to have a single 5-inch (127 mm) gun as its primary armament and carry a helicopter. When the Navy Office later prepared an initial sketch design it was for a 2,100-ton ship with a length of 335 feet (102.1 m), a beam of 40 feet (12.2 m) and a 32-knot (59 km/h; 37 mph) maximum speed. These DDLs were to be armed with two five-inch guns and operate a single light helicopter.

After preparing its initial sketch design, the Navy contracted Yarrow Admiralty Research Division (Y-ARD) in July 1970 to complete preliminary designs for the DDLs. As an initial stage, Y-ARD was required to develop sketch designs for six different armament configurations using a common hull. Requests for tender for studies on major sub-components were also issued in 1970, and these were completed by mid-1971.

The RAN conducted armament effectiveness studies of each of the six DDL variants in parallel with Y-ARD's development of the designs. These studies found that including an area air defence capability and an ability to operate two helicopters greatly improved the DDL's effectiveness. As a result, these features were included in the Navy's specification for the DDL design which was issued in late 1970. By this time the design had evolved to specify a general-purpose destroyer of 4,200 tons, armed with a five-inch gun and a Tartar missile launcher, and capable of operating two helicopters. The changes increased the cost of building the ships, and the number planned was reduced to three. Nevertheless, the DDL design was considered likely to result in very capable ships, with the 1972–73 edition of Jane's Fighting Ships commenting favourably.

The changes to the DDL design reflected shifting requirements and poor project management by the Navy. The development of an Australian-designed ship customised for Australian conditions caused naval officers to include requirements beyond those which were essential. These changes were made without regard for costs, as the team tasked with developing the specifications was not also responsible for the ships' final price and delivery schedule. The Navy's failure to maintain control of the design requirements and make cost-performance trade-offs may have been due to its limited experience in overseeing the design of new warships.

== Cancellation ==
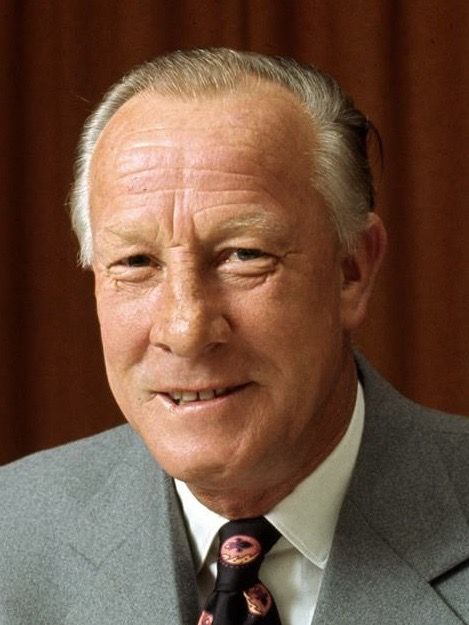
Minister for Defence Lance Barnard in 1973. Barnard criticised the DDL project when he was the Shadow Minister for Defence, and cancelled it on the advice of the navy after the Australian Labor Party came to power.

Despite the changes to the design and its growing costs, construction of three DDLs was approved by the Liberal Party McMahon government in August 1972. At this time, the total project cost was estimated at A$355 million; this figure included all costs associated with building three ships and operating them for ten years. The ships themselves were expected to cost approximately $210 million. All three were to be built at Williamstown Dockyard, with construction of the first beginning in 1975, followed by the others at two-yearly intervals. The initial DDL was to be commissioned in 1980, and the third in 1984. Further DDLs may also have been ordered to replace the Navy's destroyers as they reached the end of their service lives.

The DDL design was not supported by the Australian Labor Party (ALP) opposition, which believed that the ships would be too large and expensive for escort, patrol and surveillance duties. In June 1972 The Australian Quarterly published an article by the shadow minister for Defence, Lance Barnard, in which he argued that "the DDL concept goes completely against trends in the development of vessels for maritime warfare". Barnard also stated that the high cost of the warships would mean that not enough would be purchased to meet the RAN's requirements. He suggested that if the DDL project was cancelled the RAN's needs could be met at a lower cost by selecting one of several existing foreign designs for smaller, but just as well armed, destroyers and building these ships under licence in Australia. The Minister for the Navy, Malcolm Mackay, rejected Barnard's criticisms in August 1972, stating that studies carried out by the Navy and Department of Defence had found that smaller and less heavily armed ships would not be able to fill the DDL's intended roles.

Barnard became Minister for Defence following the election of the ALP Whitlam government in December 1972. He directed in January 1973 that the DDL project be reviewed. This review considered the feasibility of the project, including its budget and timeline, as well as the suitability of comparable American, British and Dutch warships.

Increasing costs and concerns over the ships' design led to the cancellation of the DDL project. The Department of Defence observed that the DDL's costs were escalating and it was unable to finalise the design. The Navy also reviewed the project and found that it was unduly expensive, and a joint parliamentary committee concluded that a unique Australian design entailed significant technological risks. As a result, the Navy recommended to the Government that the DDL project be cancelled. The Government concurred and the project was cannceled in August 1973. The cost of the project to the Navy had been A$1.7 million, most of which had been spent on design investigations and management consultancies. The opposition Liberal Party disagreed with the decision to cancel the DDLs.

== Aftermath ==
The DDL project's problems harmed the Australian shipbuilding industry. The cancellation of both the DDLs and another project to develop an Australian fast combat support ship design led to a perception that technical risks needed to be minimised when selecting new warships, and it was preferable to rely on proven foreign designs. Australian industry was also left with a bad impression as companies involved in the project had devoted considerable resources to preparing tenders for the DDL. Y-ARD greatly reduced its presence in Australia and the Australian naval design experts it had employed were offered jobs in the United Kingdom.

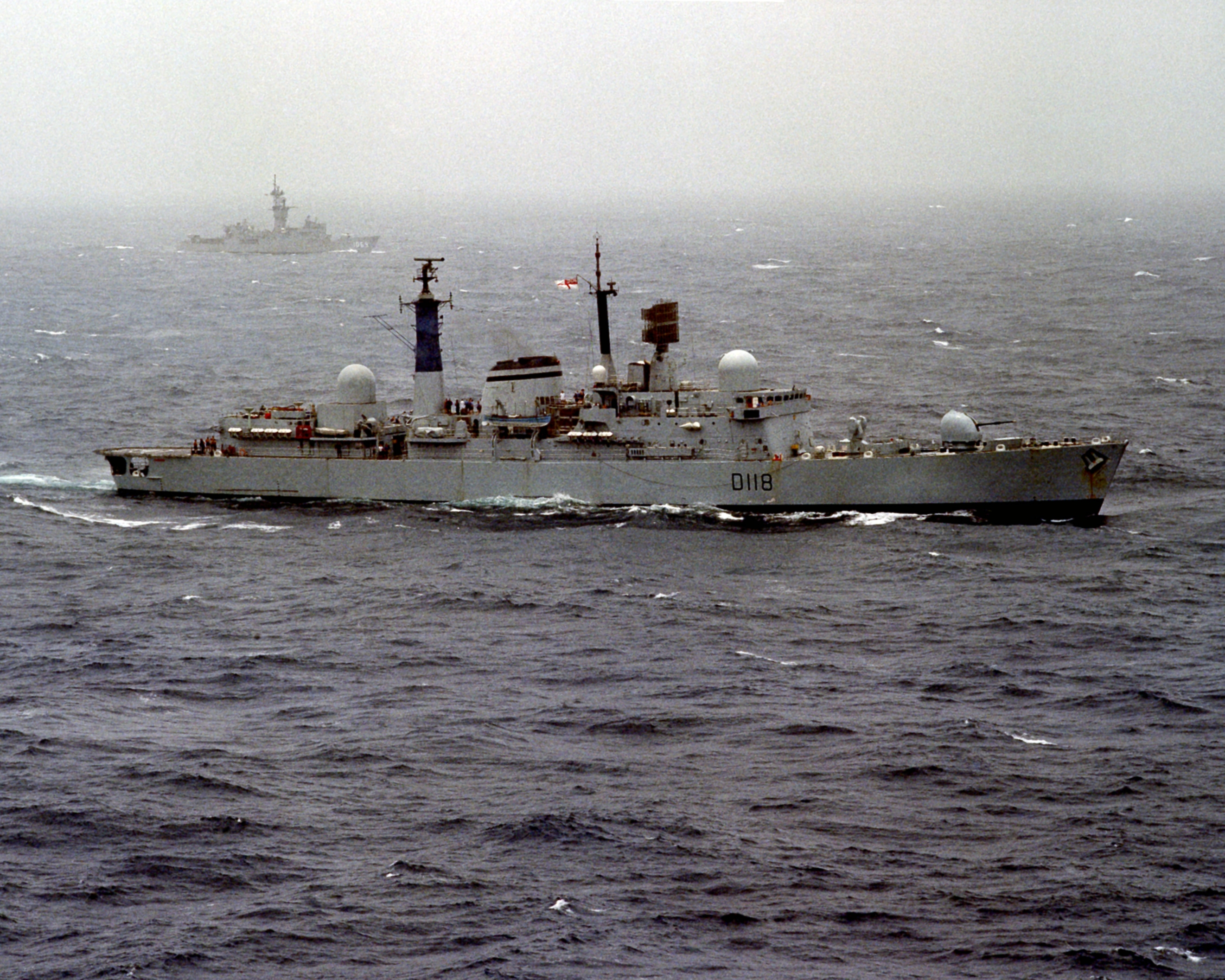
The British Type 42 was one of the designs considered after the DDL project was cancelled

As part of the decision to cancel the DDL project, the government endorsed the RAN's requirement for new destroyer-type warships and requested a review of existing foreign designs to find a replacement. The process of evaluating new designs was managed by what had been the DDL project office. In line with the government's priorities, it initially focused on selecting affordable warships of a proven design for further consideration. A large number of designs were studied by the project office and the United States' Oliver Hazard Perry-class frigates and a variant of the British Type 42 destroyer armed with American SM-1 surface to air missiles were short listed for detailed evaluation. The project team found that the Type 42 was the only design capable of meeting the Navy's requirement, and stated that the Oliver Hazard Perry class was "a second rate escort that falls short of the DDL requirements on virtually every respect". Despite this, there were serious concerns over whether it would be possible to fit SM-1 missiles to the Type 42. This led the government to approve the purchase of two Oliver Hazard Perry-class ships from the United States in April 1974.

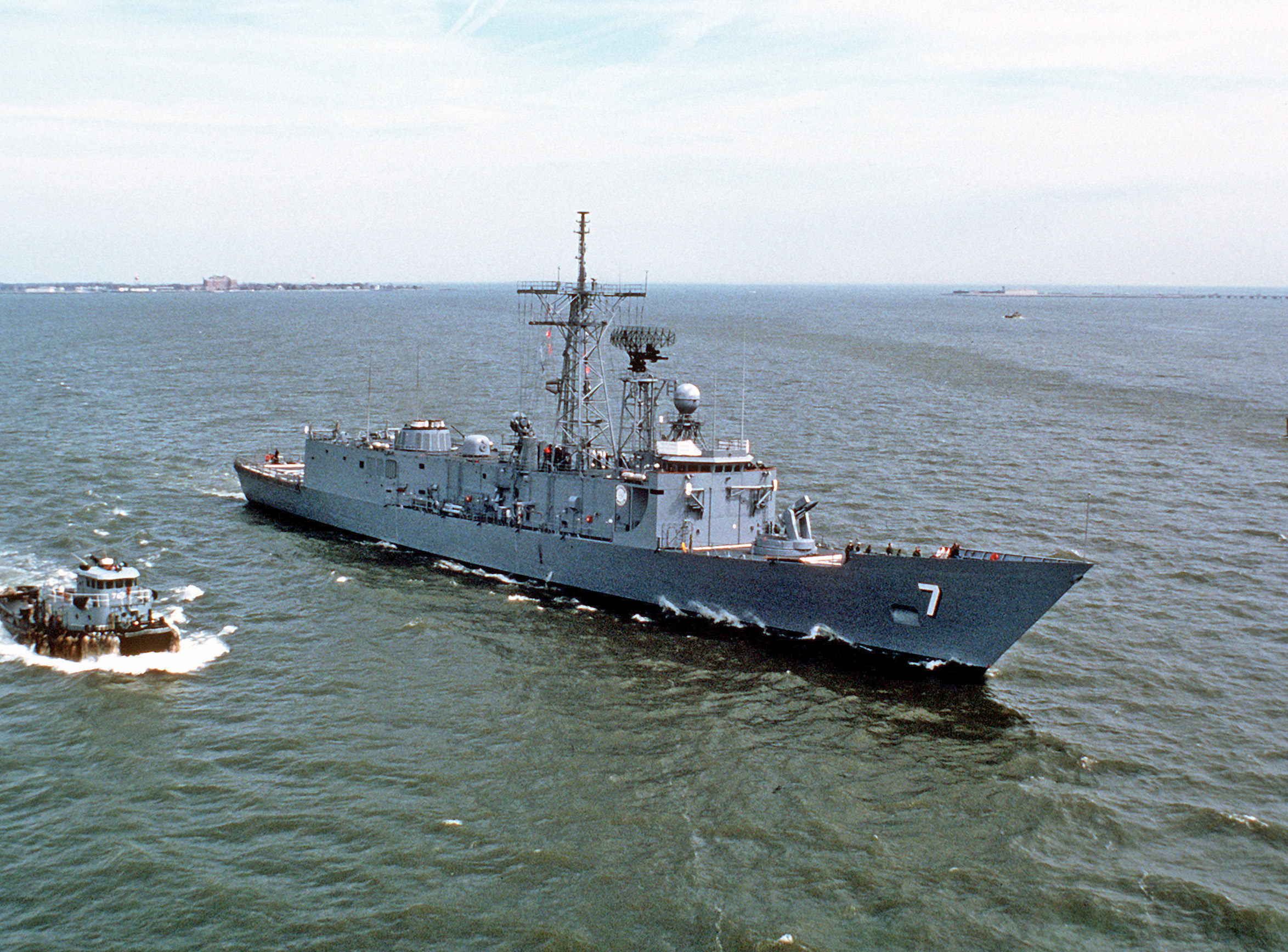
The United States' Oliver Hazard Perry class was the other option to replace the DDL project, and the design selected by the Australians.

The DDL project was reviewed again when the Liberal Fraser government came into office in late 1975. The review panel unanimously advised the new Minister for Defence James Killen that the DDL project was no longer viable as the total cost of the ships would be about $130 million higher than the Oliver Hazard Perry project, and it would take three years longer for the DDLs to be completed. Killen accepted this advice, and a firm order for two Oliver Hazard Perry frigates was placed in February 1976. A third ship was ordered in late 1977.

Six of these frigates, which were designated the Adelaide-class frigate, were eventually ordered, and the final two were built in Australia at Williamstown. The DDL project office's expertise and the preparations to order and build the ships contributed to the Navy's ability to rapidly evaluate alternative designs and oversee their entry into service. The last of the Adelaide-class frigates were retired from the RAN in 2019. Two of the type were later sold to the Chilean Navy.
