= Mark 92 Guided Missile Fire Control System =

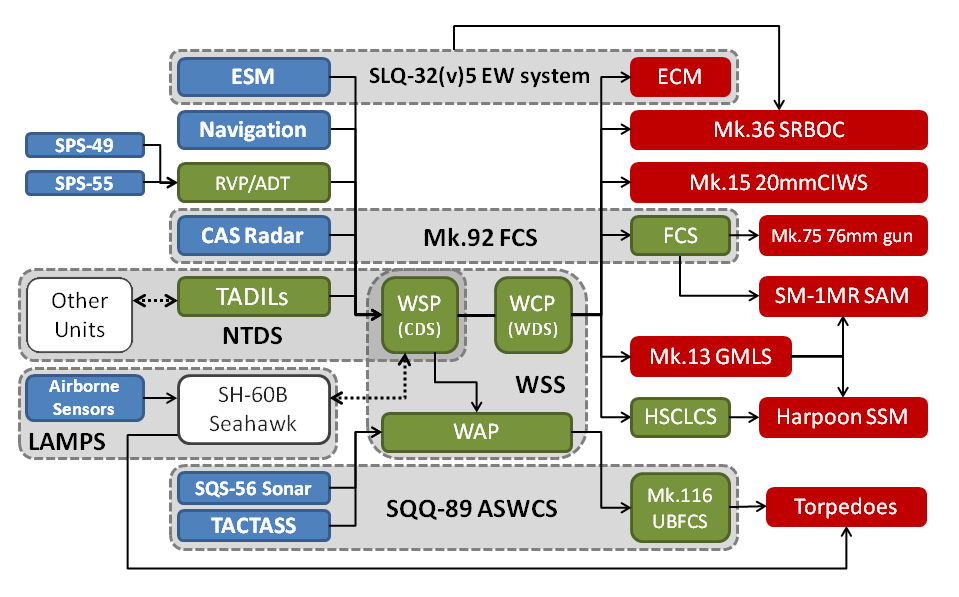
The Mark 92 is part of the combat systems of the Oliver Hazard Perry class frigate

The Mark 92 Fire Control System is a US-built medium-range anti-aircraft missile and gun fire control system. It was developed for the FFG-7 Oliver Hazard Perry class guided missile frigates. The system is a licensed USN version of the Thales Nederland WM-25 fire control system. The Mark 92 fire control system was approved for service use in 1975. Introduction to the fleet and follow-on test and evaluation began in 1978.

== Radar Systems ==
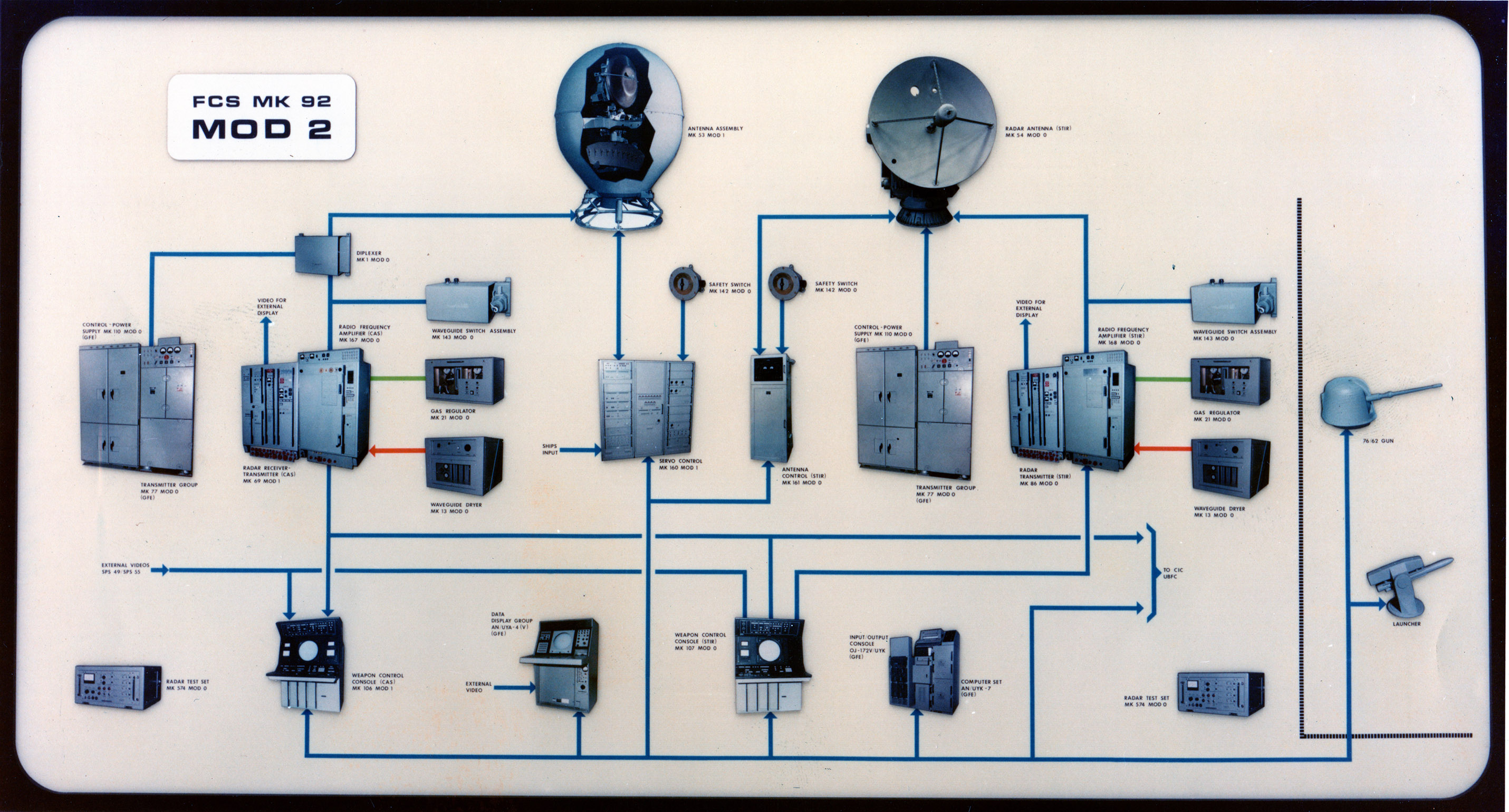
MK-92 Mod 2 Functional Diagram.jpg

The Mark 92 system assigns targets via the ship's air search radar, and surface search radar or from the Mark 92's own search radar capabilities. The system has two or three radar sub-systems depending on the model. The first two are combined into a single system called the Combined Antenna System or CAS is used in all models. The CAS has a track while scan radar (Search) and a tracking radar both housed in an egg shaped radome. The radars can search for, track, and illuminate targets. There is also a third radar for target illumination referred to as the Separate Target Illumination Radar or STIR. The STIR is a radar developed from the AN/SPG-60 radar that is part of the Mark 86 gun fire control system.

== Versions ==
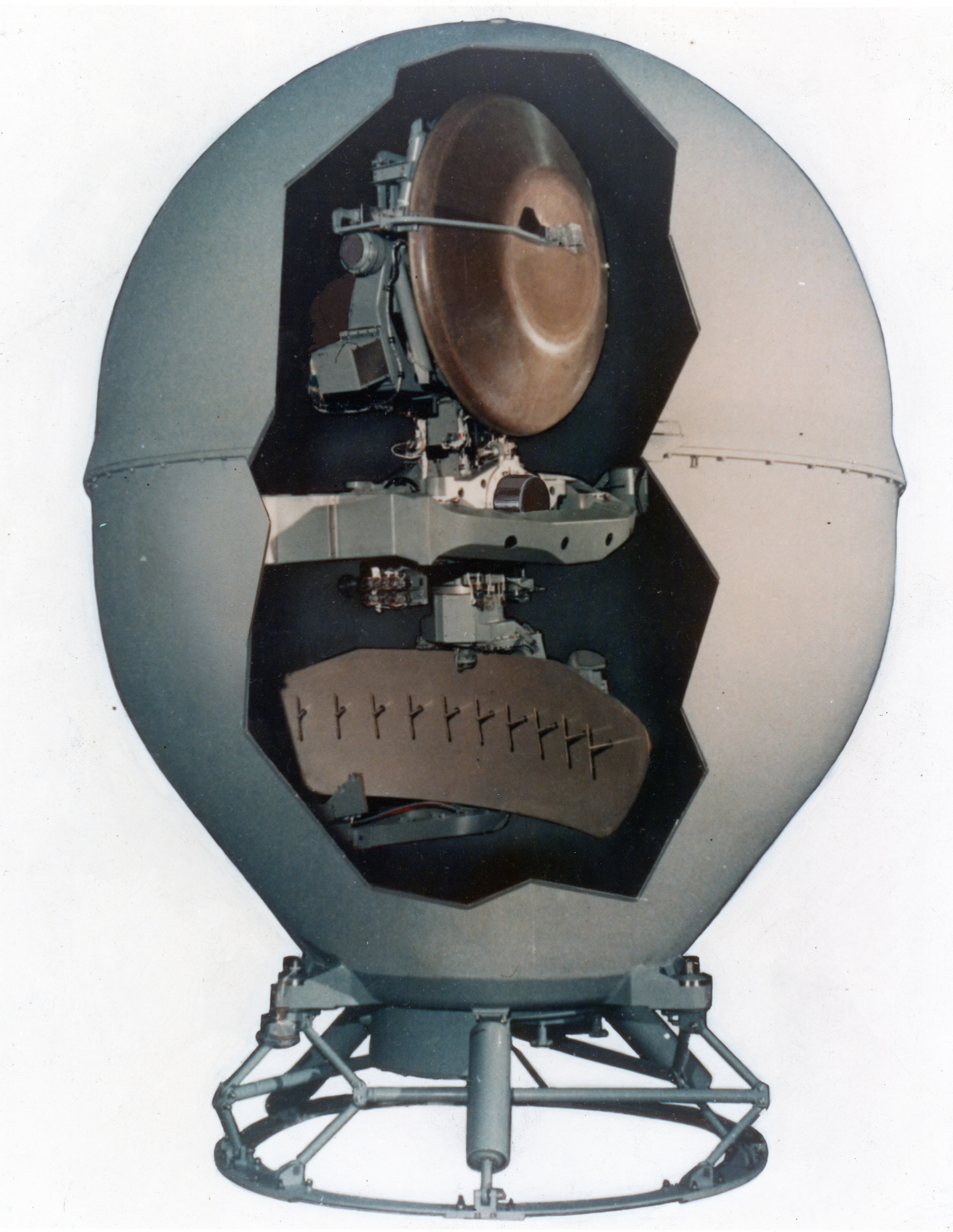
Cross-section of a Mark 92's Combined Antenna System

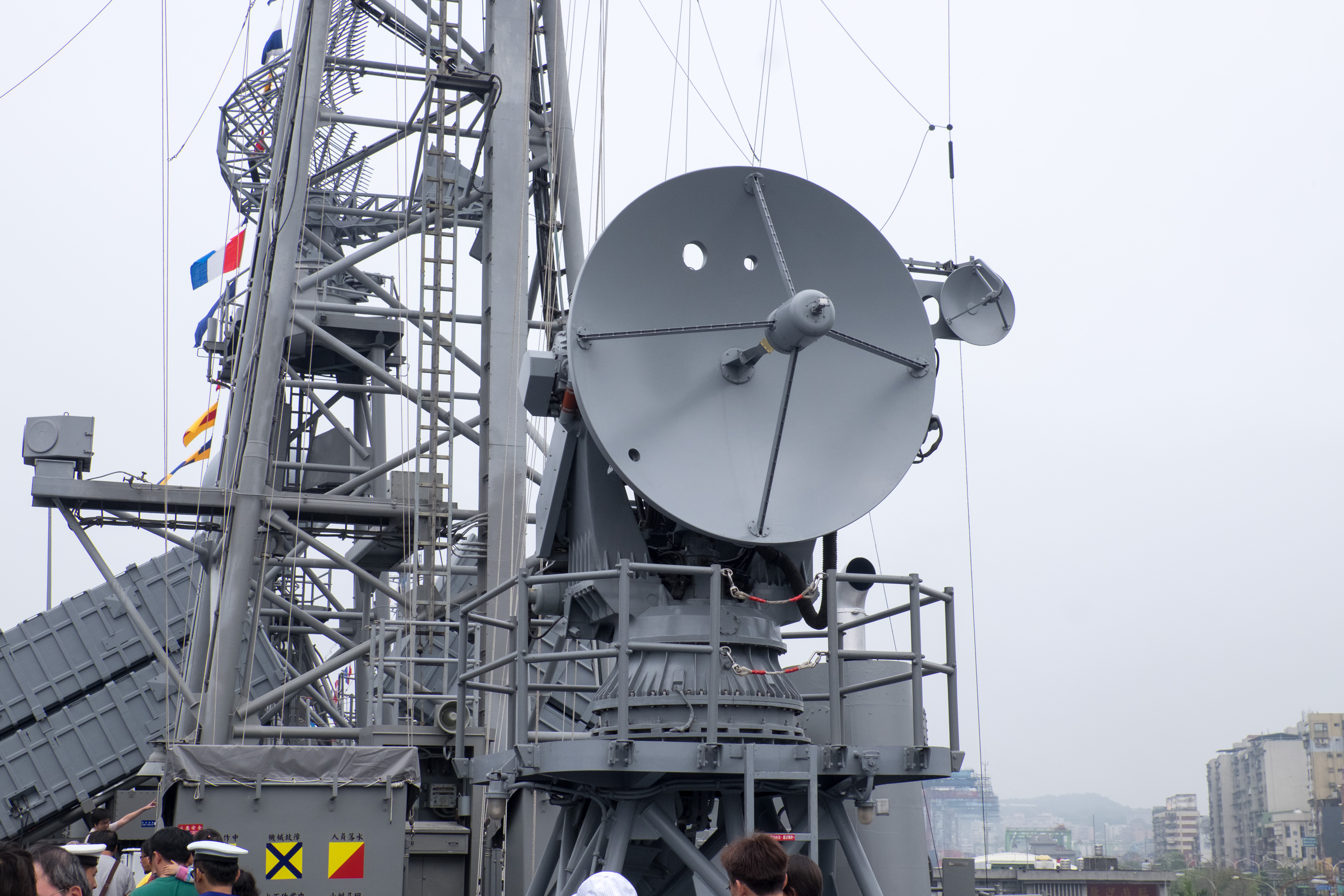
Mk92 STIR Illumination Radar

- Mark 92 modification 0 is an early version of the system for the USN.

Gun and missile control:
1 air engagement channel
2 surface-search, TWS channels

- Mark 92 modification 1 is the version used by United States Coast Guard cutters as well as the PHM-1 Class USN hydrofoils (excluding USS Pegasus. It does not use the STIR or control surface to air missiles.

Gun only:

1 air engagement channel
2 surface-search, TWS channels

- Mark 92 modification 2 is the version that was originally fit to USN Oliver Hazard Perry-class guided missile frigates. It was also installed on the Adelaide-class derivatives built for Australia.

Gun and missile control:
2 air engagement channels, including STIR with Mark 107 console
2 surface-search, TWS channels

- Mark 92 modification 5 is used by certain Saudi Arabian Badr-class corvettes (PGG and PCG Class ships).

Gun only:
1 air engagement channel
2 surface-search, TWS channels

- Mark 92 modification 6 is an upgraded version of the modification 2 as part of the CORT program. It was installed on 12 USN FFG-7-class frigates, the eight Republic of China Navy's Cheng Kung-class frigates and two of the Spanish Santa Maria-class frigates.

2 air engagement channels, including STIR with Mark 107 console and (coherent receiver/transmitter CORT) transceiver
2 surface-search, TWS channels

| Modification | Surface Engagement Channels | Air Engagement Channels (gun) | Air Engagement Channels (missile) |
| 0 | 2 | 1 | 1 |
| 1 | 2 | 1 | 0 |
| 2 | 2 | 1 | 2 |
| 5 | 2 | 1 | 0 |
| 6 | 2 | 1 | 2 |

== STIR (Separate Target Illumination Radar) Deactivated ==
The USN retired the RIM-66E, or Standard missile-1, from active service in 2003. Oliver Hazard Perry frigates in USN service have had the STIR radar removed. The STIR radars are still in use on non-USN vessels.

== See also ==
- Badr class corvette
- Hamilton class cutter
- RIM-66 Standard
- Oliver Hazard Perry class frigate
- Mark 74 "Tartar" Guided Missile Fire Control System
- USCG Medium Endurance Cutter
- Media related to Mark 92 Fire Control System at Wikimedia Commons
