= Adelaide-class frigate =

Class of Australian guided missile frigates

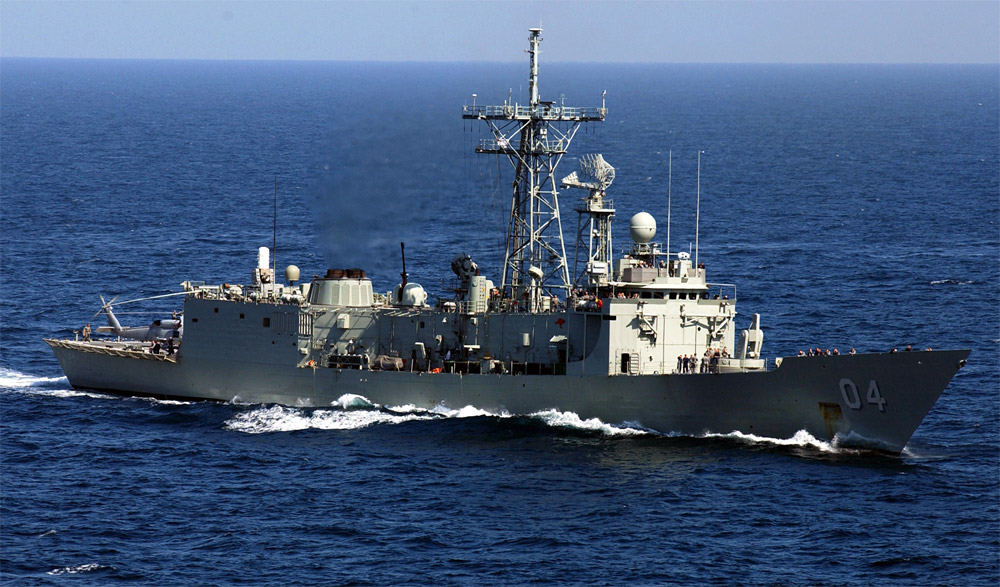
- HMAS Darwin, the fourth ship in the Adelaide class

Class overview
- Name: Adelaide class
- Builders: Todd Pacific Shipyards, Seattle, Washington; Australian Marine Engineering Consolidated
- Operators: Royal Australian Navy (former); Chilean Navy
- Preceded by: Daring-class destroyer
- Succeeded by: Hunter-class frigate
- Built: 21 June 1978 – 21 February 1992
- In service: 15 November 1980 – 27 September 2019
- In commission: 15 November 1980 – 26 October 2019
- Completed: 6
- Active: 2 (Chile)
- Retired: 4

General characteristics
- Class & type: Modified Oliver Hazard Perry-class guided missile frigate
- Displacement: 4,100 tons full load
- Length: 408 ft (124 m) at waterline; 455 ft (139 m) overall
- Beam: 45 ft (14 m)
- Draught: 22 ft (6.7 m)
- Propulsion: 2 × General Electric LM2500-30 gas turbines generating 41,000 shp (31 MW) through a single shaft and variable pitch propeller; 2 × Auxiliary Propulsion Units, 350 hp (260 kW) retractable electric azimuth thrusters for maneuvering and docking.
- Speed: Over 29 knots (54 km/h; 33 mph)
- Range: 4,500 nmi (8,300 km; 5,200 mi) at 20 knots (37 km/h; 23 mph)
- Complement: 176–221
- Sensors & processing systems: AN/SPS-49 radar; Mk 92 fire control system; AN/SPS-55 radar; FFG 01-04: AN/SQS-56 sonar; FFG 05-06: Mulloka sonar
- Armament: 8-cell Mk 41 VLS (32 quad-packed Evolved Sea Sparrow Missile); Mk 13 missile launcher (40-missile magazine, Harpoon and SM-2MR missiles (replaced SM-1MR during refit)); 1 × OTO Melara 76 mm; 1 × 20 mm Mk 15 Vulcan Phalanx; 2 × triple 324 mm Mk 32 torpedo tubes
- Aircraft carried: 2 × S-70B Seahawk or 1 × Seahawk and 1 × AS350B Squirrel
- Notes: Mk 41 VLS, ESSM capability, and SM-2MR capability installed during the FFG Upgrade project

The Adelaide class of six guided missile frigates was constructed in Australia and the United States for service in the Royal Australian Navy. Two were later sold to the Chilean Navy. The Adelaide class was based on the United States Navy's Oliver Hazard Perry-class frigates, but modified for Australian requirements. The first four vessels were built in the United States, and the final two were constructed in Australia. The first ship entered service in November 1980.

Canberra and Adelaide were paid off in 2005 and 2008, respectively, and later sunk as dive wrecks. Their decommissioning offset the cost of a A$1 billion weapons and equipment upgrade to the remaining four ships. As the Hobart-class air-warfare destroyers entered service beginning in 2016, the remaining Adelaide-class ships were progressively decommissioned beginning with Sydney in 2015. Darwin followed in 2017, and Newcastle and Melbourne went last in 2019. The final two were sold to Chile in 2020.

== Construction and acquisition ==
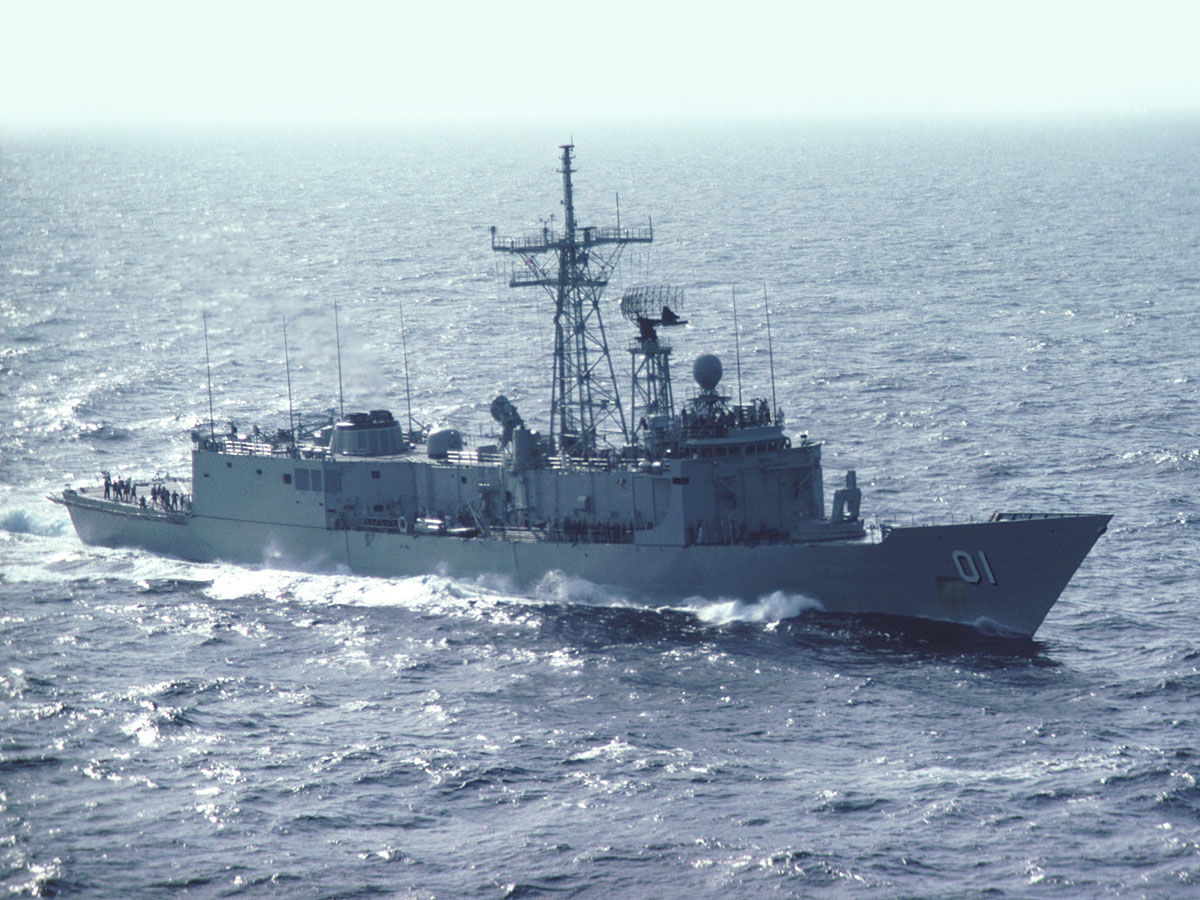
HMAS Adelaide, the first ship of the class, in 1982

Following the cancellation of the Australian light destroyer project in 1973, the British Type 42 destroyer and the American Oliver Hazard Perry-class frigate were identified as alternatives. Although the Type 42 met the Royal Australian Navy (RAN)'s requirements as a replacement for the cancelled light destroyers and the Daring-class destroyers, fitting the ship with the SM-1 missile would have been difficult. On the other hand, the Oliver Hazard Perry class was still at the design stage; a design that was described by assessment project staff as "a second rate escort that falls short of the DDL [light destroyer] requirements on virtually every respect". Despite this, the Australian government approved the purchase of two US-built Oliver Hazard Perry-class ships in 1974.

The risk of acquiring an unproven design was seen as acceptable because of the success of the United States Navy (USN)'s Charles F. Adams-class destroyer (of which the RAN operated three ships as the Perth class), when compared to the equivalent British ships the RAN would have purchased. Final government approval to order two ships was granted in 1976, with a third ship ordered in 1977. The order was expanded in April 1980 with the order of a fourth unit. These four ships were built by Todd Pacific Shipyards of Seattle, Washington, as part of the USN's shipbuilding program, and were assigned USN hull numbers during construction, which were replaced with RAN pennant numbers upon entering service. The first, HMAS Adelaide (USN hull number FFG-17, RAN pennant number FFG 01) was built to the Flight I design, while Canberra (FFG-18/FFG 02) and Sydney (FFG-35/FFG 03) were the first and last ships of the Flight II design, respectively. The final American-built ship was Darwin (FFG-44/FFG 04); constructed to the Flight III design. In 1980, two more ships (Melbourne and Newcastle) were ordered, to be built in Australia by AMECON of Williamstown, Victoria. As they were built outside the US, they did not receive USN hull numbers. Several improvements were made to Melbourne and Newcastle over their sister ships, receiving improved corrosion protection, updated versions of the Phalanx CIWS and fire control system, and the Australian-developed Mulloka sonar in use on the River-class destroyer escorts in lieu of the American AN/SQS-56.

== Armament ==
From the withdrawal of the Perth-class destroyers in 2001 until the introduction of the Hobart class in 2017, these ships were the RAN's primary air defence vessels, armed with a Mark 13 missile launcher for SM-2MR missiles. They also have significant anti-surface capability, being armed with a 76-millimetre (3.0 in) Mk 75 gun and the Harpoon anti-ship missile (also fired by the Mark 13 launcher), and a pair of triple torpedo tubes for anti-submarine warfare (ASW). In addition, two S-70B Seahawk helicopters are carried.

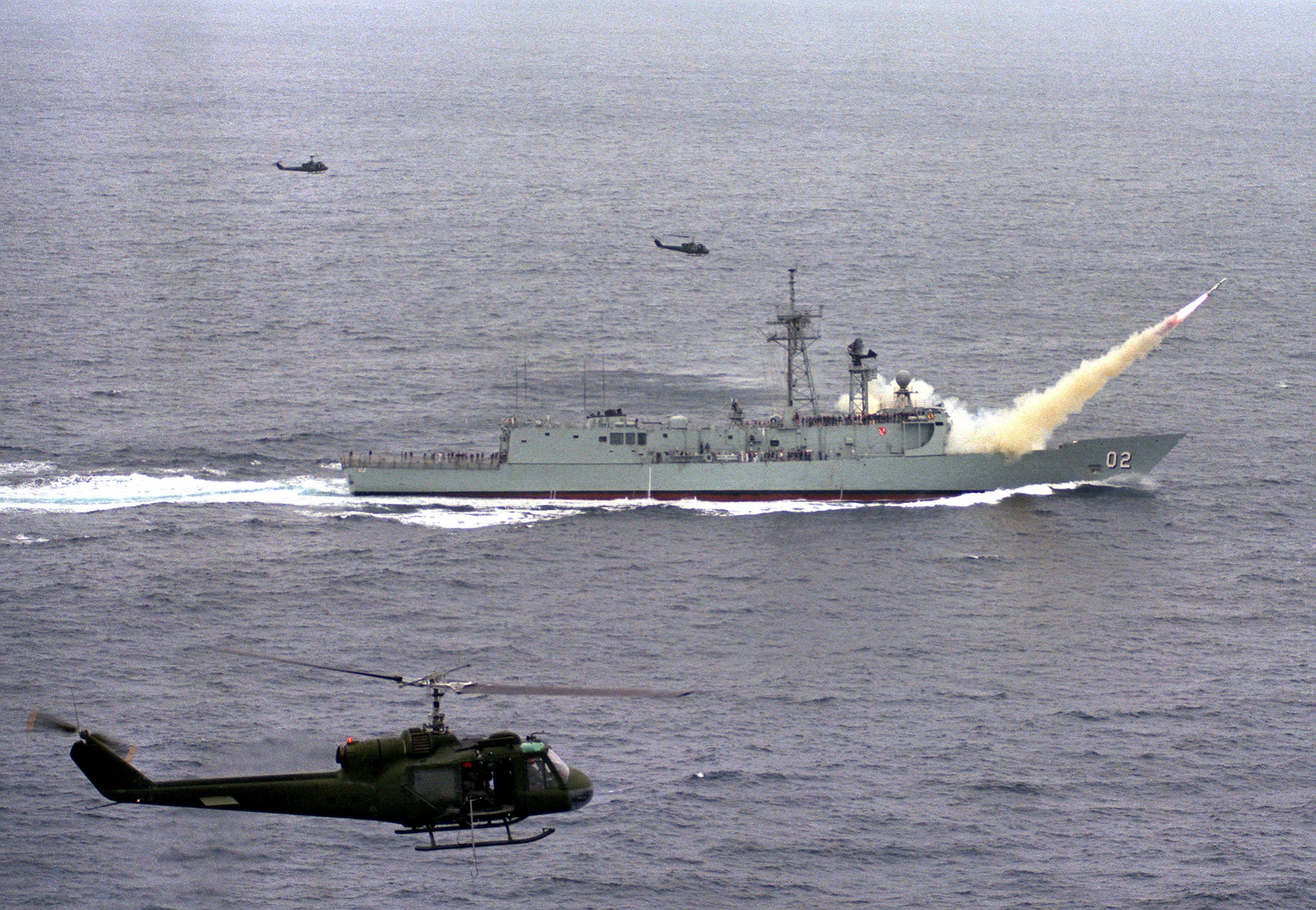
HMAS Canberra firing a Harpoon anti-ship missile

From 2005 onwards, all RAN frigates deploying to the Persian Gulf are fitted with two M2HB .50-calibre machine guns in Mini Typhoon mounts, installed on the aft corners of the hangar roof. Two TopLite EO directors are used with the guns.

The Australian frigates were originally fitted with American Mark 46 ASW torpedoes, but by 2008, they had been replaced with the European MU90 Impact torpedo in three of the four frigates as part of the FFG Upgrade, with the conversion of Newcastle underway at that point.

== Upgrades ==
There have been two major upgrades distinguishing the Adelaide class from the American Oliver Hazard Perry-class frigates.

=== Lengthening ===
The first three ships were constructed to the Oliver Hazard Perry class' 'short' hull design (Flight I and II), with an identical length for both the main deck and the keel. Ships from FFG-36 onwards (including Darwin) were built with an increase in overall length—achieved by angling the transom (the section between the fantail and the keel) to increase the area of the flight deck and allow the operation of Seahawk helicopters. Adelaide, Canberra, and Sydney were later upgraded to match the slightly larger ships, and were fitted with the updated sonars and ESM systems of the Flight III design.

=== FFG Upgrade ===
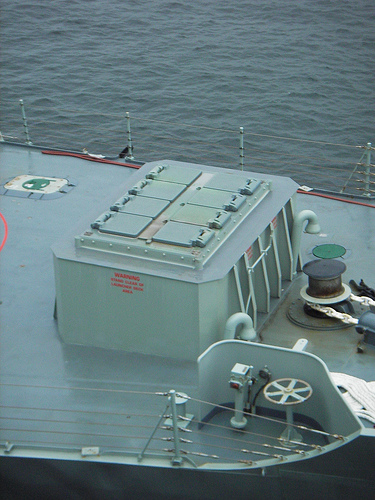
HMAS Sydney's Mk 41 VLS in 2007

In the mid-1990s, Paul Keating's Labor government decided to retain the Adelaide-class frigates instead of replacing them with the more expensive and more labour-intensive, but much more capable Kidd-class destroyers, that the USN was selling off. Upgrades to the Oliver Hazard Perry class were problematic, due to "little reserved space for growth (39 tons in the original design), and the inflexible, proprietary electronics of the time", such that the "US Navy gave up on the idea of upgrades to face new communications realities and advanced missile threats". The USN had decommissioned 25 "FFG-7 Short" ships via "bargain basement sales to allies or outright retirement, after an average of only 18 years of service".

Keating's administration was succeeded by the Liberal government of John Howard, which commenced SEA 1390, also known as the FFG Upgrade Project. Originally costing A$1 billion, which eventually increased to A$1.46 billion, the project included improvements to the combat and fire control system, the sonar suite, and the air defence missiles. The upgrade was for four ships, and intended to expand their service life to approximately 2020. The project cost was partly offset by the decommissioning of the two oldest units: Canberra being decommissioned in 2005 and Adelaide in 2008. Modification of each ship took place at Garden Island Dockyard, with Australian Defence Industries (ADI, now Thales Australia) selected as project leader for the upgrade phase of the project.

By January 2008, the FFG Upgrade Project was running at least four years behind schedule. The frigates' anti-missile and anti-torpedo detection and defense systems could not be integrated as intended, leaving the ships vulnerable to attack. The first ship refitted, HMAS Sydney, was initially not accepted back into service by the RAN because of the problems, these issues also prevented any refitted ship from serving in a combat zone. Australian Defence Association executives and serving navy personnel have blamed both political parties for the problems: while the Howard Liberal government was responsible for the project, the preceding Labor government chose to maintain the frigates instead of replacing them with the Kidd-class destroyers in the early 1990s.

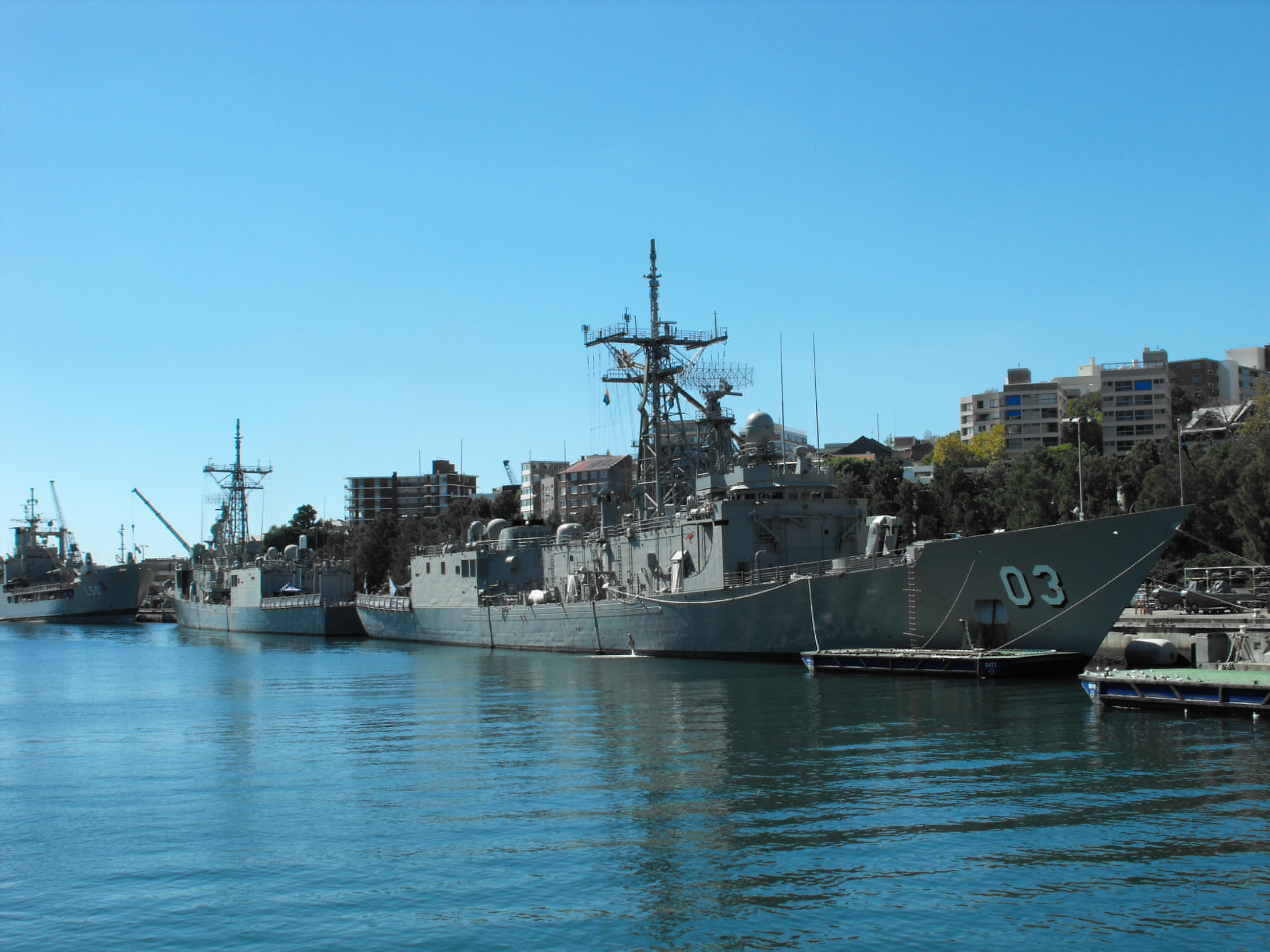
Sydney (foreground) and Darwin alongside at Fleet Base East in 2011

By November 2008, Darwin's upgrade had been completed, while the problems experienced with Sydney had been rectified in both ships. It was planned to start deploying these warships to the Gulf in 2009. The RAN and Thales subsequently claimed that the two upgraded ships were the "most capable ships in the history of the RAN", and that once the other two Adelaides were upgraded, the navy would possess the "most lethal frigate fleet on earth". It was reported at the same time that other nations operating guided missile frigates, including the United States, Canada, Greece, and Turkey were considering similar upgrades.

After the four surviving Adelaide-class ships were refitted, they were capable of firing SM-2MR and RGM-84 Harpoon missiles from the Mark 13 launcher. The replacement of the SM-1MR with the SM-2MR doubled the engagement range for air targets. An 8-cell Mark 41 Vertical Launch System for Evolved Sea Sparrow Missile had also been installed forward of the Mark 13 launcher. The Phalanx CIWS was upgraded to Block 1B, and the torpedoes, missiles, and other ship-mounted weapons were upgraded to the latest versions. All four ships had their hull sonars replaced with an improved version of the Spherion sets used on the Anzac-class frigates.

== Fates ==
Canberra and Adelaide were decommissioned to offset the cost of upgrading the remaining four ships, with Canberra on 12 November 2005 and Adelaide on 19 January 2008.

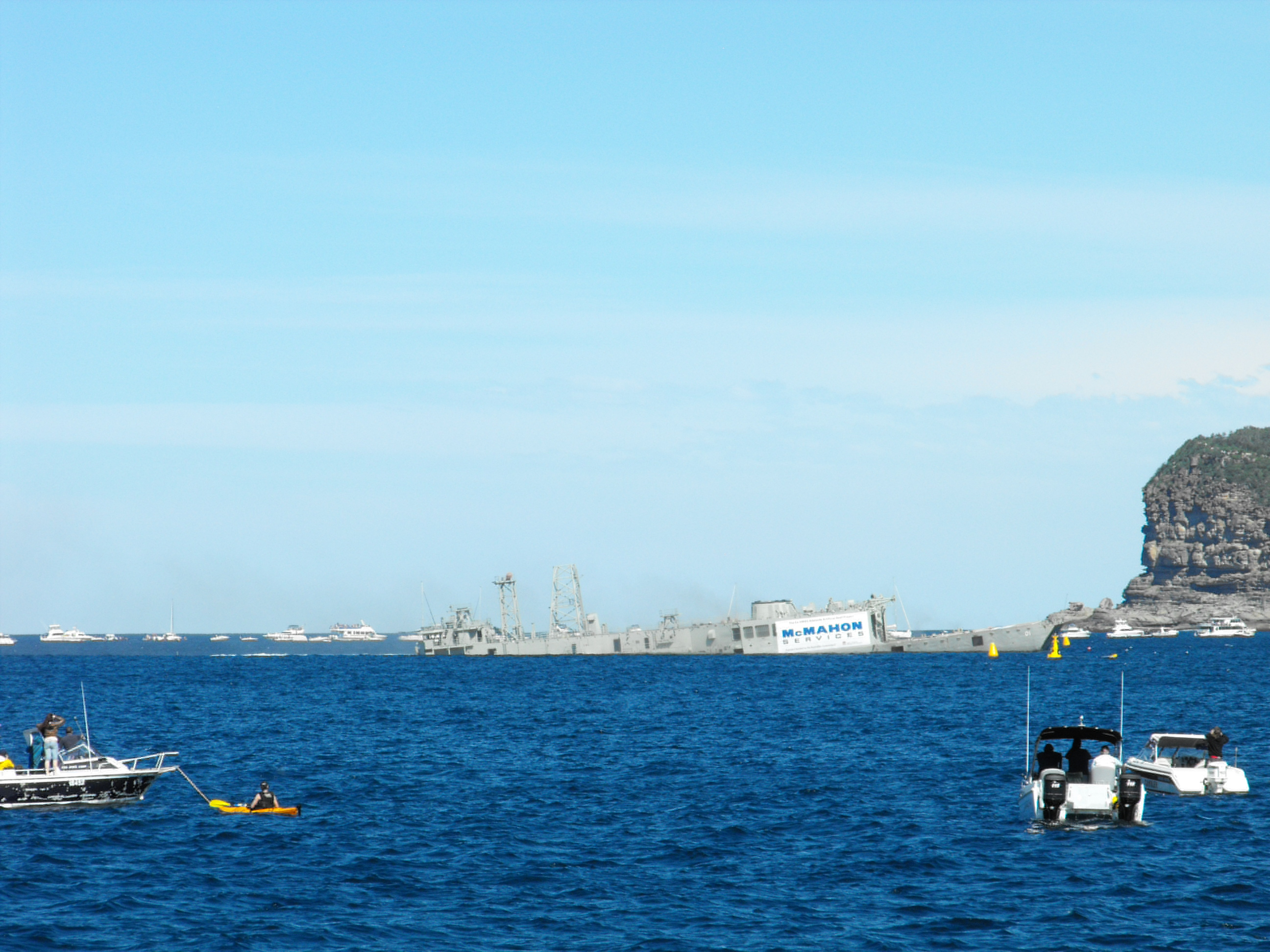
Adelaide sinking off Avoca Beach on 13 April 2011

Canberra was subsequently sunk as a dive wreck on 4 October 2009, 2 nautical miles (3.7 km; 2.3 mi) off Ocean Grove, Victoria, in 30 metres (98 ft) of water. Adelaide was converted into a dive wreck, but plans to scuttle her off Avoca Beach, New South Wales in April 2010 were postponed following protests by resident action groups and a tribunal hearing. The tribunal ordered the removal of wiring and paint from sections of the frigate before she was sunk on 13 April 2011.

Sydney entered port for the final time in February 2015, but remained commissioned as an alongside training ship until 7 November. In May 2017, having not received any offers to convert the hull for use as a dive wreck, Sydney was sold for scrap.

Darwin arrived in Sydney for the last time on 1 November 2017, prior to her decommissioning ceremony on 9 December.

The upgraded Adelaide-class frigates were replaced by three new Hobart-class air warfare destroyers, equipped with the Aegis combat system, starting around 2016.

In April 2017, the Polish government officially expressed interest in purchasing two of the remaining three frigates when they are retired from service. Negotiations between the Australian and Polish Governments for the sale were unsuccessful. In January 2019 the Greek Government sent an expression of interest to the Department of Defence for Melbourne and Newcastle. In May 2019 it was reported that Chile had also shown interest in the two frigates. On 27 December 2019, it was announced that Melbourne and Newcastle had been sold to Chile.

On 15 April 2020 the ships were handed over to the Chilean Navy and renamed Capitan Prat (FFG-11) (ex HMAS Newcastle) and Almirante Latorre (FFG-14) (ex HMAS Melbourne)

== Ships ==
Name	Pennant number	Builder	Laid down	Launched	Commissioned	Paid off	Status/fate
Royal Australian Navy
Adelaide	FFG 01	Todd Pacific Shipyards, Seattle	29 July 1977	21 June 1978	15 November 1980	19 January 2008	Scuttled as dive wreck, 13 April 2011
Canberra	FFG 02	Todd Pacific Shipyards, Seattle	1 March 1978	1 December 1978	21 March 1981	12 November 2005	Scuttled as dive wreck, 4 October 2009
Sydney	FFG 03	Todd Pacific Shipyards, Seattle	16 January 1980	26 September 1980	29 January 1983	7 November 2015	Broken up at Henderson, Western Australia 2017
Darwin	FFG 04	Todd Pacific Shipyards, Seattle	3 July 1981	26 March 1982	21 July 1984	9 December 2017	Broken up at Henderson, Western Australia
Melbourne	FFG 05	AMECON, Williamstown	12 July 1985	5 May 1989	15 February 1992	26 October 2019	Sold to Chile, as Almirante Latorre
Newcastle	FFG 06	AMECON, Williamstown	21 July 1989	21 February 1992	11 December 1993	30 June 2019	Sold to Chile, as Capitan Prat
Chilean Navy
Almirante Latorre	FFG 14	AMECON, Williamstown	12 July 1985	5 May 1989	15 April 2020		In active service
Capitan Prat	FFG 11	AMECON, Williamstown	21 July 1989	21 February 1992	15 April 2020		In active service

== See also ==
Equivalent frigates of the same era

- Jacob van Heemskerck class
- Santa María class
- Godavari class
- Cheng Kung class
- Cassard class

== Citation ==
=== Books ===
- Frame, Tom (1992). Pacific Partners: a history of Australian-American naval relations. Rydalmere, NSW: Hodder & Stoughton. ISBN 0-340-56685-X. OCLC 27433673.
- Jones, Peter (2001). "1972–1983: Towards Self-Reliance". In Stevens, David (ed.). The Royal Australian Navy. The Australian Centenary History of Defence (vol III). South Melbourne, VIC: Oxford University Press. ISBN 0-19-555542-2. OCLC 50418095.
- MacDougall, Anthony Keith (2002) [1991]. Australians at war: a pictorial history (2nd (revised and expanded) ed.). Noble Park, Vic: The Five Mile Press. ISBN 1-86503-865-2. OCLC 260099887.
- N.A. (1990). "Australian Defence Boost". Warship International. XXVII (2): 192–194. ISSN 0043-0374.
- Saunders, Stephen, ed. (2008). Jane's Fighting Ships 2008–2009. Jane's Fighting Ships (111th ed.). Surrey: Jane's Information Group. ISBN 978-0-7106-2845-9. OCLC 225431774.

=== Journal articles ===
- Fish, Tim; Grevatt, Jon (24 June 2008). "Australia's HMAS Toowoomba test fires MU90 torpedo". Jane's Navy International. Jane's Information Group.
- Fish, Tim (1 March 2008). "Australia's Adelaide ends 27 years of service". Jane's Navy International. Jane's Information Group.
- Hooton, E.R. (1 December 1996). "Perking-up the Perry class". Jane's International Defence Review. 9 (9). Jane's Information Group.
- Scott, Richard (12 December 2007). "Enhanced small-calibre systems offer shipborne stopping power". International Defence Review. Jane's Information Group.

=== News articles ===
- Draper, Michelle (4 October 2009). "Old Warship sunk off Victoria's coast". The Sydney Morning Herald. Archived from the original on 4 October 2009.
- Kirk, Alexandra; (and staff) (2 January 2008). "Dud frigates an inherited nightmare". ABC News. Australian Broadcasting Corporation. Archived from the original on 3 January 2008.
- Harvey, Ellie; West, Andrew (16 September 2010). "Judge orders tough new rules for scuttling". The Sydney Morning Herald. Archived from the original on 18 September 2010.
- McPhedran, Ian (2 January 2008). "Frigates 'can't go to war' despite $1.4bn upgrade". The Advertiser. News Limited. Archived from the original on 4 January 2008.
- McPhedran, Ian (19 November 2008). "Australia's naval frigates 'worth the wait'". The Daily Telegraph.
- Westbrook, Tom (13 April 2011). "Dolphins frolic, protesters sunk as frigate sent to the bottom". The Australian.

=== Websites and other media ===
- "Australia's Hazard(ous) Frigate Upgrade". Defense Industry Daily. Watershed Publishing. 14 January 2008.
- "HMAS Adelaide Decommissions" (Press release). Australian Department of Defence. 20 January 2008.
