= HMAS Stirling =

Australian naval base near Perth

- Part of Fleet Base West
- Garden Island, Western Australia in Australia
- Coat of arms of HMAS Stirling

Site information
- Type: Naval base and military airport
- Owner: Department of Defence
- Operator: Royal Australian Navy

Location
- Coordinates: 32°14′30″S 115°41′00″E

Site history
- Built: 1978

Garrison information
- Current commander: Captain Ken Burleigh, RAN
- Garrison: RAN Submarine Service; Submarine Escape Training Facility

HMAS Stirling
- IATA: none; ICAO: YGAD

Summary
- Airport type: Military
- Operator: Royal Australian Navy
- Location: Garden Island, Western Australia
- Elevation AMSL: 30 ft (9.1 m)

Map
- Location in Western Australia

Runways
Direction	Length		Surface
Direction	m	ft	Surface
05/23	450	1,476	Asphalt
- Sources: AIP

HMAS Stirling is a Royal Australian Navy (RAN) base that is part of Fleet Base West situated on the west coast of Australia, on the Indian Ocean. The base is located on Garden Island in the state of Western Australia, near the city of Perth. Garden Island also has its own military airport on the island (ICAO: YGAD). HMAS Stirling is currently under the command of Captain Ken Burleigh, RAN.

== History ==
HMAS Stirling is named after Admiral Sir James Stirling (28 January 1791 – 23 April 1865). Stirling, a Royal Navy officer and colonial administrator, landed on Garden Island, Western Australia in 1827 and returned as commander of the barque Parmelia in June 1829 to establish and administer the Swan River Colony in Western Australia. He was the first Governor of Western Australia, serving between 1828 and 1838.

The planning of Stirling began in 1969 when, after it was decided to create the Two-Ocean Policy, a feasibility study into the use of Garden Island as a naval base was begun. The 4.3 km (2.7 mi) causeway linking the island with the mainland was completed in June 1973. Construction of the wharves and workshops began in early 1973 and accommodation in 1975 with the facility, including the new Fleet Base West, being formally commissioned on 28 July 1978.

The first major unit to call Fleet Base West home was HMAS Stuart, having first been assigned to Stirling in 1984 for several years and, after refitting in the east, again in 1988 until decommissioning in 1991. The first submarine to be based at Stirling was HMAS Oxley in 1987. Later, the headquarters of the Australian Submarine Squadron was relocated there in 1994.

Stirling has expanded significantly within its existing boundaries and is the largest of the RAN's shore establishment, with a base population of approximately 2,300 service personnel, 600 defence civilians and 500 contractors. Amenities included berthing and wharves, vessel repair and refit services, a ship-lift, and a helicopter support facility, as well as medical facilities, fuel storage and accommodation. The base also hosts the Submarine Escape Training Facility – one of only six in the world and the only one in the Southern Hemisphere.

From 2027, up to 1,200 US uniformed military personnel will work at the base, with USS Colorado announced as the first Virginia-class submarine to be based there under the AUKUS trilateral security partnership, from late 2027.

=== Garden Island ===
Garden Island is 10 km (6.2 mi) in length, 1.5 km (0.93 mi) wide, and is 13 km^{2} (5.0 sq mi) in area, with Stirling occupying approximately 28% of that area. The remaining portion of the Island is nature reserve, the navy has been active in the removal of introduced flora and fauna species. The island has its own quarantine conditions, which prohibit bringing of plants and animals to the island.

== Submarine Rotational Forces-West ==
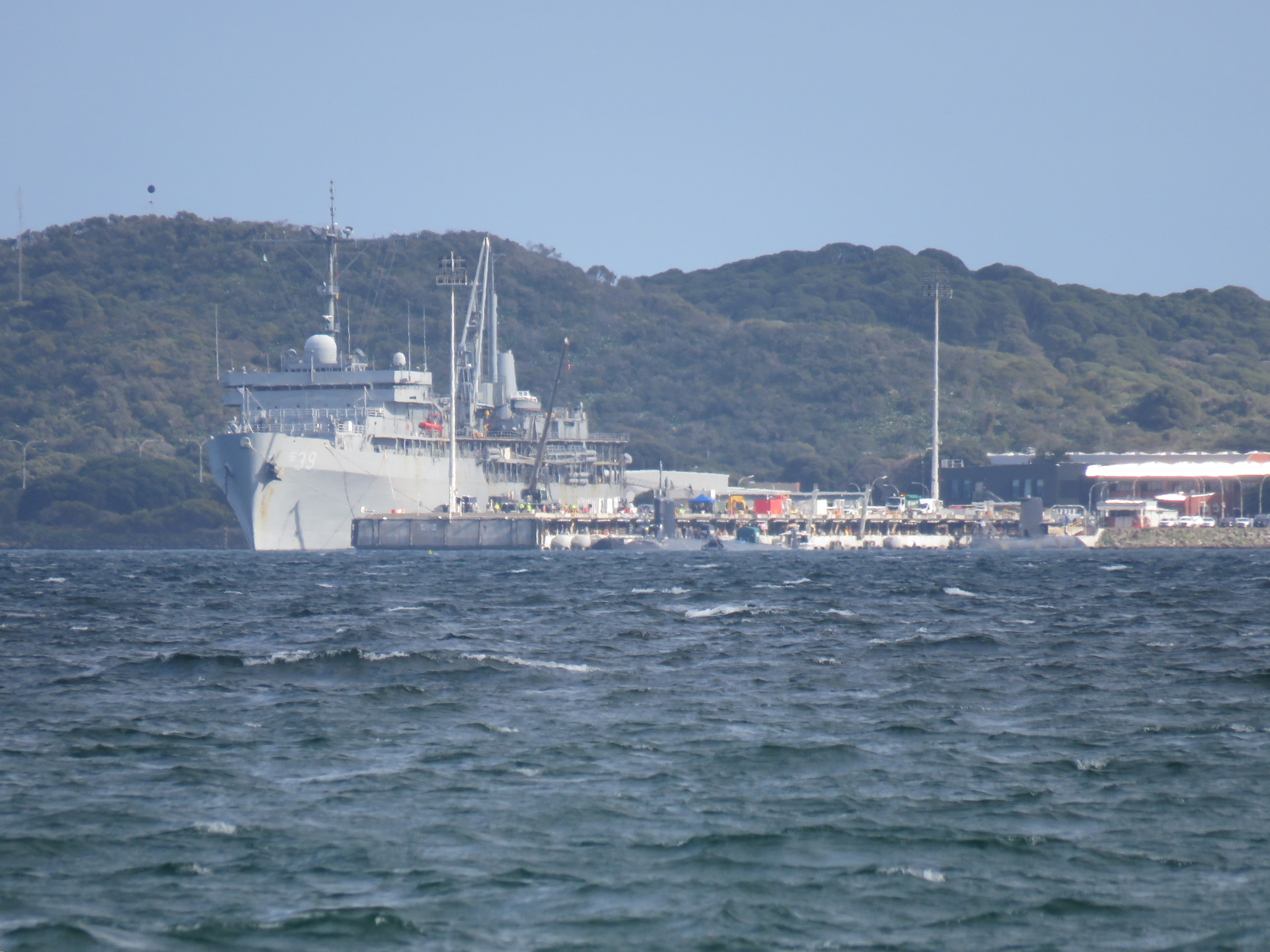
The USS Emory S. Land (AS-39) and USS Hawaii (SSN-776) at HMAS Stirling in August 2024

In March 2023, the US, UK and Australia announced, as part the AUKUS trilateral security partnership, the Submarine Rotational Forces-West (SRF-W) initiative whereby the US and UK would maintain a permanent rotational presence of nuclear-powered submarines at the base. From 2027, the UK and the US plan to establish a rotational presence of one UK Astute-class submarine and up to four US Virginia-class submarines at Stirling. Between 2023 and 2026, US and UK submarines will visit Stirling more frequently and remain for longer.

Since the AUKUS partnership commenced in September 2021, Stirling has received visits from the following US and UK nuclear-powered submarines:

Vessel	Class	Date	Country
HMS Astute	Astute-class submarine	October 2021	United Kingdom
USS Springfield	Los Angeles-class submarine	April 2022	United States
USS Asheville	Los Angeles-class submarine	March 2023	United States
USS North Carolina	Virginia-class submarine	August 2023	United States
USS Annapolis	Los Angeles-class submarine	March 2024	United States
USS Hawaii	Virginia-class submarine	August – September 2024	United States
USS Minnesota	Virginia-class submarine	February – March 2025	United States
USS Vermont	Virginia-class submarine	October – November 2025	United States
HMS Anson	Astute-class submarine	February 2026 – March 2026	United Kingdom
USS Colorado	Virginia-class submarine	October 2026 – November 2026	United States

== Ships stationed ==
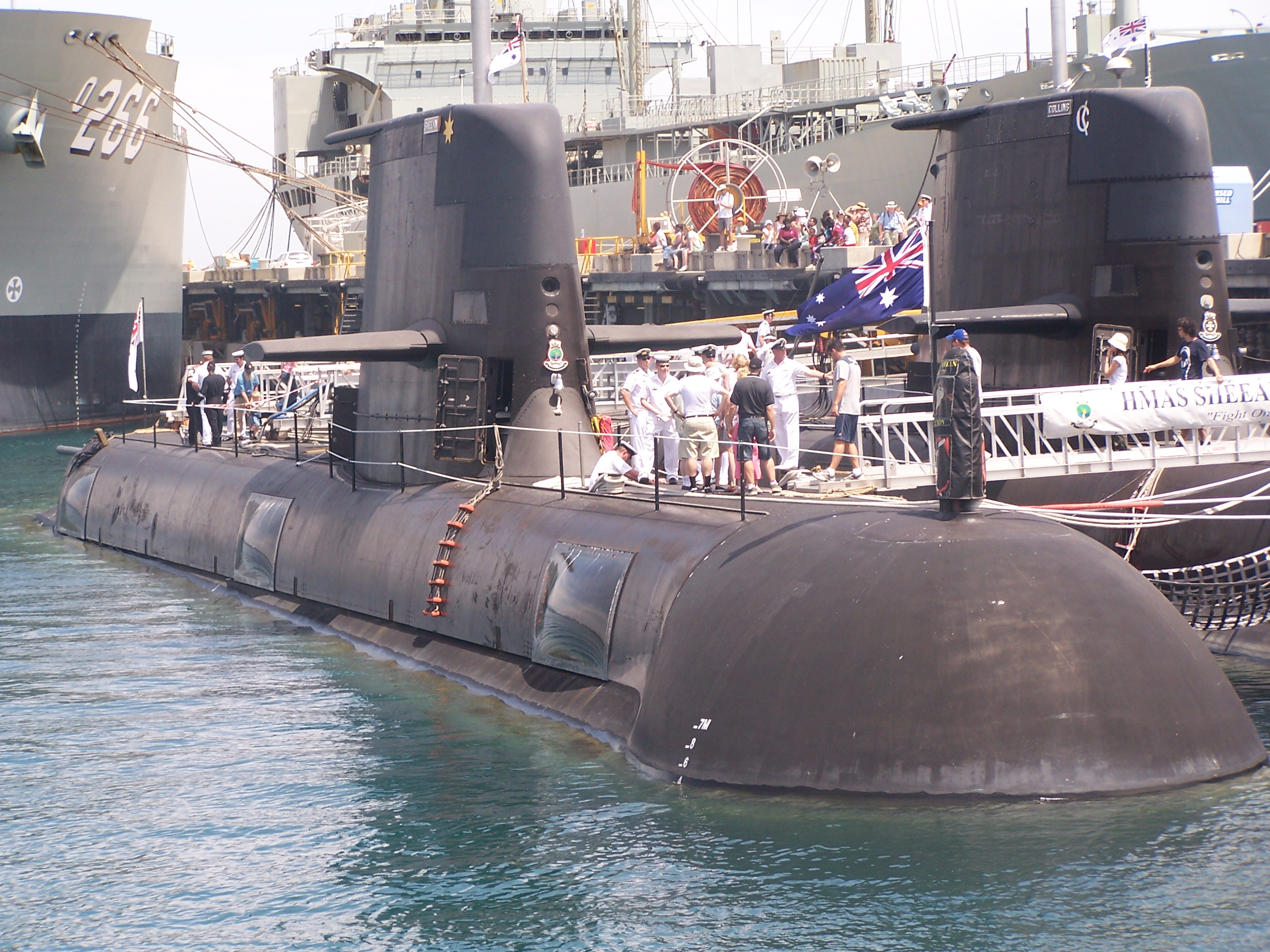
HMAS Sheean (front left), HMAS Collins (front right), HMAS Sirius (back left) and ex-HMAS Westralia at HMAS Stirling in 2006

Stirling is home port to 10 fleet units, including four Anzac class frigates, all six of the Collins class submarines operated by the Royal Australian Navy Submarine Service, and a replenishment vessel.

- Anzac-class frigate, helicopter
  - HMAS Stuart
  - HMAS Ballarat
  - HMAS Toowoomba
  - HMAS Perth
- Collins-class submarine, guided missile
  - HMAS Collins
  - HMAS Farncomb
  - HMAS Waller
  - HMAS Dechaineux
  - HMAS Sheean
  - HMAS Rankin
- Supply-class auxiliary oiler replenishment
  - HMAS Stalwart
- Arafura-class offshore patrol vessel
  - HMAS Arafura
- Other
  - MV Stoker
  - MV Besant

== See also ==
- List of airports in Western Australia
- List of Royal Australian Navy bases
- CETO Perth Wave Energy Project
- Women's Peace Train
- Garden Island Highway
