= Submarine Escape Training Facility (Australia) =

Shore facility of the Royal Australian Navy

- Garden Island in Australia

Site information
- Type: Training facility

Location
- Coordinates: 32.239°S 115.683°E

Site history
- Built: 1987

The Submarine Escape Training Facility (SETF), also known as the Submarine Escape and Rescue Centre (SERC), is a facility used by submariners of the Royal Australian Navy (RAN) to train in the techniques needed to escape from a submarine in trouble.

== Background ==
Submarine use in the RAN began in 1913 with the E-class submarines AE1 and AE2. Both were lost during World War I; AE1 disappearing with all hands. In the inter-war years, the RAN operated six J-class submarines, then two Odin-class submarines. After a long break, six British-designed submarines of the Oberon class were purchased; the RAN relied entirely on the Royal Navy for their expertise in submarine escape methods and equipment. Communications between the two nations showed some breakdown during the 1980s, and with the introduction of the Collins-class submarines, the RAN had a need to establish their own institutional knowledge in these techniques.

== Facility ==
The SETF was built during 1987 at HMAS Stirling, located on Garden Island, Western Australia. Prior to this, RAN submariners were trained at the Submarine Escape Training Tower at HMS Dolphin in Gosport, England. The SETF is the only submarine escape training system in the Southern Hemisphere, and one of only six operational worldwide.

The SETF was originally staffed solely by the RAN. However, the regular reposting of instructors caused a knowledge drain; to counteract this, the RAN contracted civilian diving companies to provide the training. Management of the facility was contracted to ASC Pty Ltd, with its partner Hyperbaric Health Pty. Ltd. (HH), but in January 2009, The Australian newspaper reported that the SETF had sat unused since May 2008 because of a contract dispute between ASC and the RAN. RAN personnel were sent to Canada for escape training until March 2011, when the SETF reopened.

== Training ==
Escape training is generally a five-day course. The course culminates in a free ascent in the facility's 22-metre (72 ft) vertical freshwater tank, with only one attempt permitted. New submarine trainees have to pass the course before they can be posted to a submarine, and submariners must requalify every three years.

Pressurisation of the escape tower takes less than 20 seconds to reach a maximum escape depth of 180 metres (590 ft) in order to reduce the risk of decompression illness. In 1995, training was changed to require two buoyant ascents from 9 metres (30 ft), wearing the submarine escape jerkin and two hooded ascents in the tower from 22 metres (72 ft) to reduce the risk of pulmonary barotrauma. Prior to 1995, candidates were required to perform two buoyant ascents from 9 metres, one buoyant ascent from 22 metres wearing the submarine escape jerkin, one hooded ascent in the compartment from 22 metres, and two hooded ascents in the tower from 22 metres.

== Citations ==
=== Books and journals ===
- Davidson, Jon; Allibone, Tom (2005). Beneath Southern Seas. Crawley, WA: University of Western Australia Press. ISBN 1-920694-62-5. OCLC 69242056.
- Walker, Robyn (1999). "The history of Australian submarine escape and rescue operations". South Pacific Underwater Medicine Society Journal (29, number 2).
- Walker, Robyn (2002). "Lung assessment for submarine escape training". South Pacific Underwater Medicine Society Journal (32, number 1).

=== News articles ===
- Mouritz, Katey (14 April 2011). "Sub escape training returns to FBW". Navy News. p. 11.
- Stewart, Cameron (31 January 2009). "Sub safety row spurs overseas training". The Australian. Archived from the original on 2 February 2009.
