= History of the Royal Australian Navy =

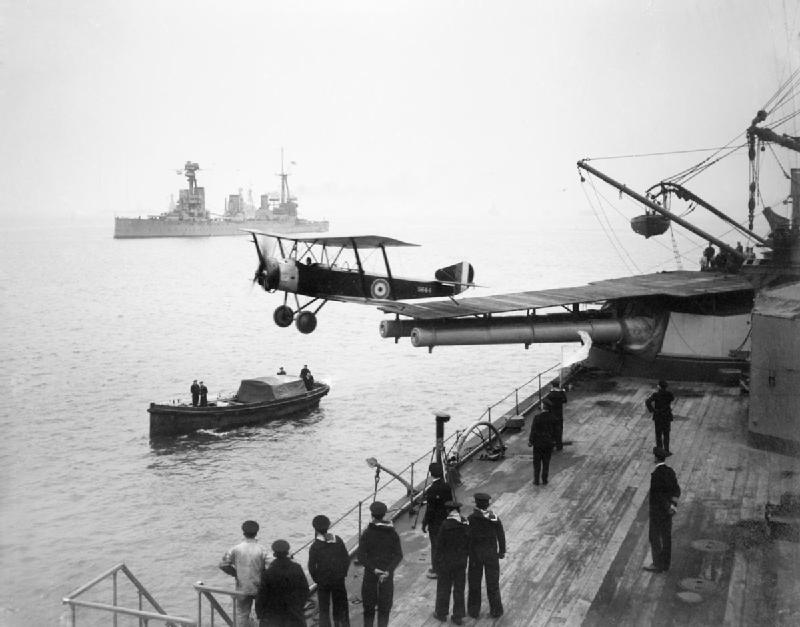
A Sopwith 1½ Strutter aircraft taking off from a temporary flight deck on the first HMAS Australia, a battle cruiser, in 1918.

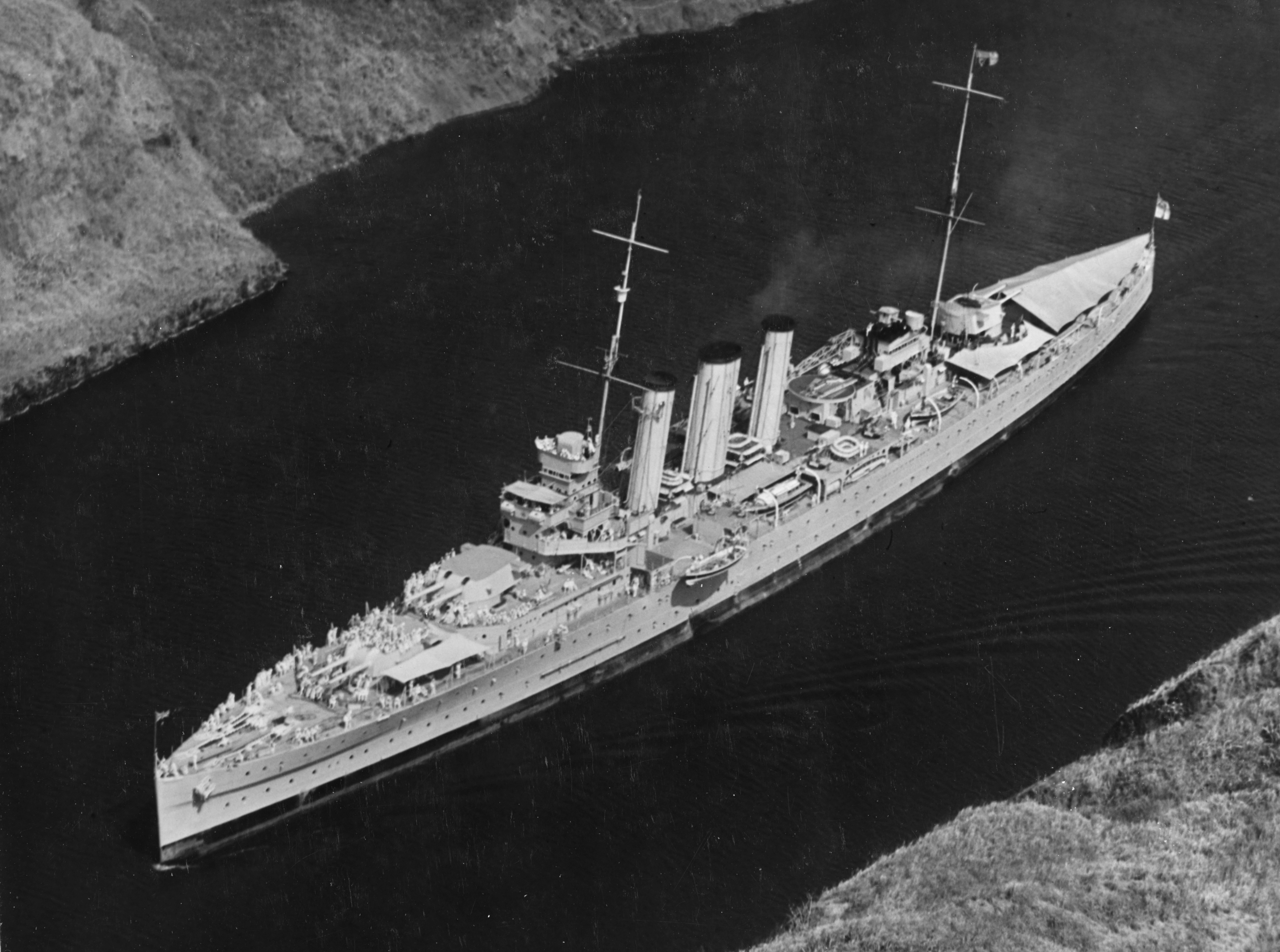
An aerial view of the second HMAS Australia – a heavy cruiser – passing through the Panama Canal in March 1935. Australia saw extensive combat in World War II.

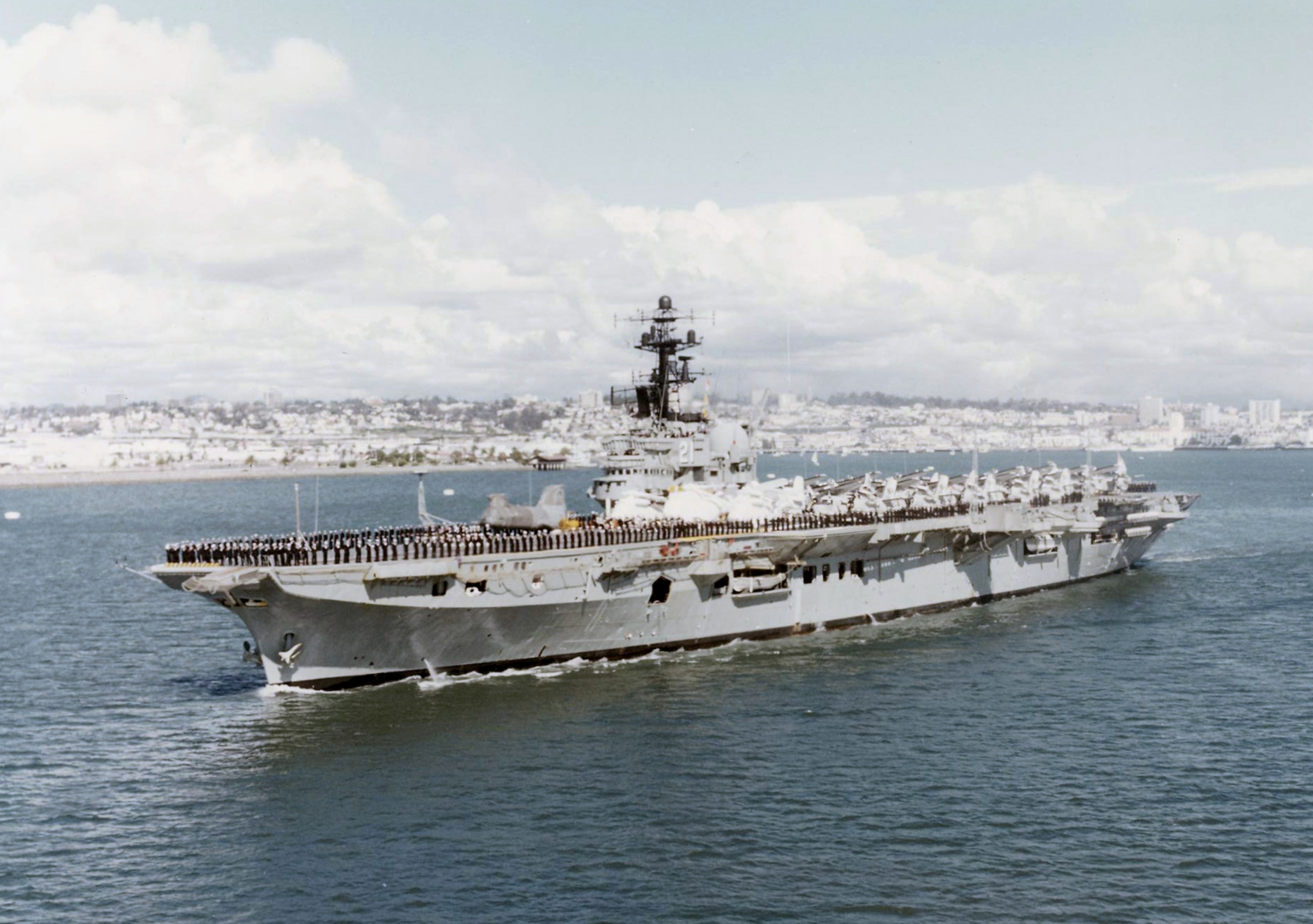
HMAS Melbourne steams into San Diego Harbor, California (USA), in 1977.

The history of the Royal Australian Navy traces the development of the Royal Australian Navy (RAN) from the colonisation of Australia by the British in 1788. Until 1859, vessels of the Royal Navy made frequent trips to the new colonies. In 1859, the Australia Squadron was formed as a separate squadron and remained in Australia until 1913. Until Federation, five of the six Australian colonies operated their own colonial naval force, which formed on 1 March 1901 the Australian Navy's (AN) Commonwealth Naval Force which received Royal patronage in July 1911 and was from that time referred to as Royal Australian Navy (RAN). On 4 October 1913 the new replacement fleet for the foundation fleet of 1901 steamed through Sydney Heads for the first time.

The Royal Australian Navy has seen action in every ocean of the world. It first saw action in World War I, in the Pacific, Indian and Atlantic oceans. Between the wars the RAN's fortunes shifted with the financial situation of Australia: it experienced great growth during the 1920s, but was forced to reduce its fleet and operations during the 1930s. Consequently, when it entered World War II, the RAN was smaller than it had been at the start of World War I. During the course of World War II, the RAN operated more than 350 fighting and support ships; a further 600 small civilian vessels were put into service as auxiliary patrol boats. (Contrary to some claims, however, the RAN was not the fifth-largest navy in the world at any point during World War II.)

Following World War II, the RAN saw action in Korea, Vietnam, and other smaller conflicts. Today, the RAN consists of a small but modern force, widely regarded as one of the most powerful forces in the Asia Pacific Region.

== Australia Station ==
In the years following the establishment of the British colony of New South Wales in 1788, Royal Navy ships of the East Indies Squadron under the command of the East Indies Station would be station in or visit Australian waters. From the 1820s, a ship was sent annually to New South Wales, and occasionally to New Zealand.

In 1848, an Australian Division of the East Indies Station was established, and in 1859 the British Admiralty established an independent command, the Australia Station, under the command of a commodore who was assigned as commander-in-chief, Australia Station. The Australian Squadron was created to which British naval ships serving on the Australia Station were assigned. The changes were partially in recognition of the fact that a large part of the East Indies Station had been detached to Australian waters, and also reflecting growing concern for the strategic situation in the western Pacific in general, and in Tahiti and New Zealand in particular. In 1884, the commander of the Australia Station was upgraded to the rank of rear admiral.

At its establishment, the Australia Station encompassed Australia and New Zealand, with its eastern boundary including Samoa and Tonga, its western edge in the Indian Ocean, south of India and its southern edge defined by the Antarctic Circle. The boundaries were modified in 1864, 1872 and 1893. At its largest, the Australia Station reached from the Equator to the Antarctic in its greatest north–south axis, and covered 1/4 of the Southern Hemisphere in its extreme east–west dimension, including Papua New Guinea, New Zealand, Melanesia and Polynesia.

In 1911 the Australia Station passed to the Commonwealth Naval Forces (initially under the command of RN officers) and the Australian Squadron was disbanded. The Station, now under nominal Australian command, was reduced to only cover Australia and its island dependencies to the north and east. In 1911, the Commonwealth Naval Forces was renamed the Royal Australian Navy, which in 1913 came under Australian command. The Royal Navy's Australia Station's Sydney based depots, dockyards and structures were gifted to the Commonwealth of Australia. The Royal Navy continued to support the RAN and provided additional blue-water defence capability in the Pacific up to the early years of World War II.

== Colonial navies and federation ==
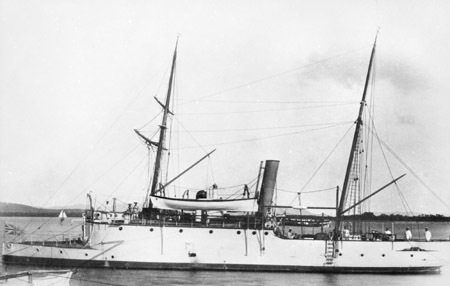
The gunboat HMQS Paluma in 1889

Before the Federation of Australia in 1901, five of the six self-governing colonies in Australia operated a navy, the exception being Western Australia which did not have a naval force. The colonial navies were supported by the ships of the Royal Navy's Australian Station which was established in 1859. In 1856, Victoria received its own naval vessel, HMCSS Victoria, which in 1860 was deployed to assist the New Zealand colonial government during the First Taranaki War. When Victoria returned to Australia, the vessel had taken part in several minor actions, with the loss of one crew member. The deployment of Victoria to New Zealand marked the first occasion that an Australian warship had been deployed overseas. In the years leading up to Federation, Victoria had the most powerful of the colonial navies. Victoria had HMVS Cerberus since 1870, as well as HMVS Nelson, three small gunboats and five torpedo-boats. NSW had two very small torpedo boats, and the corvette Wolverine. The colonial navies were expanded greatly in the mid-1880s and usually consisted of gunboats and torpedo-boats for coastal defence of harbours and rivers, and naval brigades to man vessels and forts.

On 1 January 1901, Australia became a federation of six States, as the Commonwealth of Australia, which on 1 March 1901 took over the defence forces from the States, to form the Commonwealth Naval Forces. The Australian and New Zealand governments agreed with the Imperial government to help fund the Royal Navy's Australian Squadron, while the Admiralty committed itself to maintain the Squadron at a constant strength. In 1902, the commander of the Australia Station was upgraded to the rank of vice admiral. The boundaries were again modified in 1908.

== Formation ==
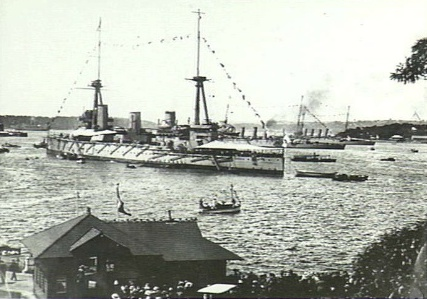
The official welcome to the new units of the Royal Australian Navy

A growing number of people, among them Captain William Rooke Creswell, the director of the Commonwealth Naval Forces, demanded an autonomous Australian navy, financed and controlled by Australia. In 1907 Prime Minister Alfred Deakin and Creswell, while attending the Imperial Conference in London, sought the British Government's agreement to end the subsidy system and develop an Australian navy. The Admiralty rejected the idea, but suggested diplomatically that a small fleet of destroyers and submarines would be sufficient. Deakin was not impressed with the Admiralty, and in 1908 invited the United States Great White Fleet to visit Australia. The visit prompted public enthusiasm for a modern navy and led to the order of two 700-ton River-class torpedo-boat destroyers. The surge in German naval construction in 1909 led the Admiralty to change its position on an Australian navy, which resulted in the Naval Defence Act 1910 being passed which created the Australian navy.

The first Australian warship, the destroyer HMAS Parramatta, was launched at Govan in Scotland on Wednesday 9 February 1910. Sister ship HMAS Yarra was launched at Dumbarton in Scotland on Saturday 9 April 1910. Both ships were commissioned into the Royal Navy on 19 September 1910 and sailed for Australia, arriving at Port Phillip on 10 December 1910. The event was marred by the death of Engineer Lieutenant W. Robertson, RN, who suffered a heart attack 8 miles (13 km) outside Port Phillip Heads whilst onboard HMAS Yarra, and drowned.

The British Australia Station passed to the Commonwealth Naval Forces in 1911 and the Australian Squadron was disbanded. On 10 July 1911, King George V granted the title of "Royal Australian Navy" to the Commonwealth Naval Forces, and RAN ships could carry the prefix "His Majesty's Australian Ship" (HMAS). The Station was reduced to cover Australia and its island dependencies to the north and east, excluding New Zealand and its surrounds, which became part of the China Station and called the New Zealand Naval Forces. The Navy was to operate under the authority of the Australian Commonwealth Naval Board, which functioned from 1 March 1911.

At the 1911 Imperial Conference Australia expressed concern about Japan's growing naval power and it was agreed that the British government would consult Australia when negotiating renewal of the Anglo-Japanese Alliance. It was also decided that the Royal Navy would continue to support the RAN and provide blue-water defence capability in the Pacific and that if there was war the ships of the RAN would be transferred to British Admiralty control. Under the Naval Defence Act 1912 (Cth) the power to make the transfer was conferred in the governor-general. The RAN would become the Australia Squadron of the Royal Navy with all ships and personnel under the direct control of the British Admiralty, while the RAN remained responsible for the upkeep of the ships and training.

In 1913, responsibility for the reduced Australia Station passed to the new Royal Australian Navy under nominal Australian command, with the Australia Squadron of the Royal Navy's Australia Station coming to an end and its Sydney-based depots, dockyards and structures being gifted to the Commonwealth of Australia. The first commanding officer was Admiral George Edwin Patey, Rear Admiral Commanding HM Australian Fleet, on loan from the Royal Navy. On Saturday 4 October 1913 the Australian fleet, consisting of the battle cruiser Australia, the cruisers Melbourne and Sydney, the protected cruiser Encounter, and the torpedo-boat destroyers Parramatta, Yarra and Warrego, entered Sydney Harbour for the first time. The manpower of the fleet stood at four hundred officers and men and, for the next two years, ships were built for the fledgling navy.

The Royal Navy continued to support the RAN and provide blue-water defence capability in the Pacific up to the early years of World War II. In 1958, the boundaries of Australia Station was redrawn again, now to include Papua New Guinea.

== World War I ==
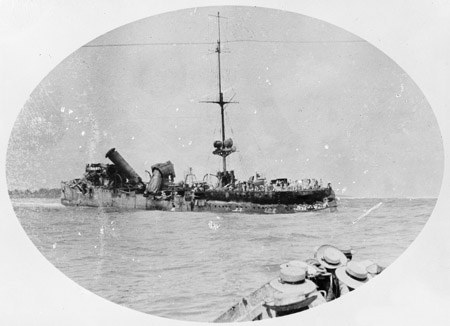
The wrecked German raider Emden

On 3 August 1914, as the prospect of war with the German Empire loomed, the Australian Government sent the following message to the Admiralty.

In the event of war Government prepared place vessels of Australian Navy under control British Admiralty when desired.

The United Kingdom declared war on Germany the next day, and on 8 August, the Australian Government received a reply, requesting that the transfer be made immediately, if not already done. Two days later, on 10 August, the Governor-General officially transferred control of the Royal Australian Navy to the British Admiralty, which would retain control until 19 August 1919.

At the outbreak of war, the RAN stood at 3,800 personnel and consisted of sixteen ships, including the battlecruiser Australia, the light cruisers Sydney and Melbourne, the destroyers Parramatta, Yarra, and Warrego, and the submarines AE1 and AE2. The light cruiser Brisbane and three destroyers were under construction, and a small fleet of auxiliary ships was also being maintained. As a consequence the Royal Australian Navy at the start of the war was a small but formidable force.

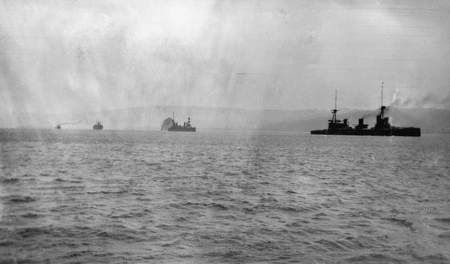
The Australian squadron entering Simpson Harbour, Rabaul, September 1914

Australian ships first saw action in the Asian and Pacific theatre; assisting in the attack on German New Guinea by the Australian Naval and Military Expeditionary Force (AN&MEF). Germany had colonised the northeastern part of New Guinea and several nearby island groups in 1884, and the colony was currently used as a wireless radio base, Britain required the wireless installations to be destroyed because they were used by the German East Asia Squadron which threatened merchant shipping in the region. The objectives of the force were the German stations at Yap in the Caroline Islands, Nauru, and Rabaul in New Britain. On 30 August 1914, the AN&MEF left Sydney under the protection of Australia and Melbourne for Port Moresby, where the force met the Queensland contingent, aboard the transport HMAHS Kanowna. The force then sailed for German New Guinea on 7 September, leaving Kanowna behind when her stokers refused to work. Sydney and her escorting destroyers met the AN&MEF off the eastern tip of New Guinea. Melbourne was detached to destroy the wireless station on Nauru, while on 14 September, Encounter bombarded a ridge near Rabaul, while half a battalion advanced towards the town. The only major loss of the campaign was the disappearance of the submarine AE1 during a patrol off Rabaul on 14 September 1914.

On 9 November 1914, the German light cruiser SMS Emden attacked the Allied radio and telegraph station at Direction Island in the Cocos (Keeling) Islands. The inhabitants of the island managed to transmit a distress signal, which was received by Sydney, only 50 miles (80 km) away. Sydney arrived within two hours, and was engaged by Emden. Sydney was the larger, faster and better armed of the two, and eventually overpowered Emden, with captain Karl von Müller running the ship aground on North Keeling Island at 11:15 am. At first, Emden refused to strike its colours and surrender; Sydney fired on the stationary Emden until it eventually struck its colours. The Battle of Cocos was the first battle the RAN participated in.

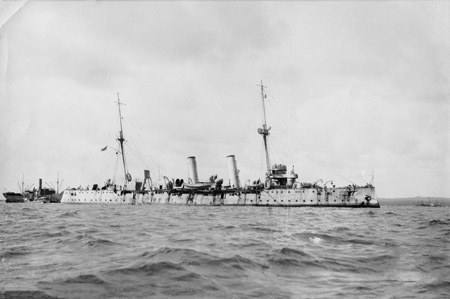
HMAS Pioneer off East Africa in 1916

On 6 February 1915, the obsolescent light cruiser HMAS Pioneer joined the East African campaign. On 6 July, she engaged the German cruiser SMS Königsberg and German shore batteries, during the Battle of Rufiji Delta. Pioneer remained off East Africa and took part in many bombardments of German East Africa, including Dar-es-Salaam on 13 June 1916. Pioneer then returned to Australia, to be decommissioned in October 1916.

During the Naval operations in the Dardanelles Campaign the Australian submarine AE2 became the first Allied warship to breach the Turkish defences of the Dardanelles. AE2 spent five days in the area, was unsuccessfully attacked several times, but was unable to find any large enemy troop transports. On 29 April 1915, she was damaged in an attack by the Turkish torpedo-boat Sultan Hisar in Artaki Bay and was scuttled by her crew. The wreck of AE2 remained undiscovered until June 1998.

Ships of the Royal Australian Navy also assisted the Royal Navy in the blockade of the German High Seas Fleet. In February 1915, HMAS Australia joined the British Grand Fleet, and was made flagship of the 2nd Battle Cruiser Squadron. Australia was not involved in the Battle of Jutland; in April, the battlecruiser was damaged in a collision with sister ship HMS New Zealand, and she did not return to service until June. Three RAN ships were present during the surrender of the German High Seas Fleet; Australia, Sydney, and Melbourne, with Australia leading the port division of the Grand Fleet as it sailed out to meet the Germans.

The most decorated Australian Naval unit of World War One, however was not a ship at all, but the Royal Australian Navy Bridging Train, a land-based unit composed mostly of reservists which landed at Suvla Bay with the British IX Corps and was responsible for receiving, storing and distributing the supplies, including potable water, of the British troops at Suvla. Due to their position working the piers and landings at Suvla, the Train was the last Australian unit to depart the Gallipoli Peninsula. After Gallipoli, the Train was sent to the Middle East, where they made a second amphibious landing at the Battle of Magdhaba, before returning to Australia and being disbanded after a series of miscommunications during May 1917.

Expansion during the war had been limited, with the RAN growing to include thirty-seven ships and more than 5,000 personnel by 1918. The RAN's losses had also been modest, only losing the two submarines AE1 and AE2, whilst casualties included 171 fatalities – 108 Australians and 63 officers and men on loan from the Royal Navy, with less than a third the result of enemy action.

== The 1918–19 influenza pandemic ==
Between April 1918 and May 1919, the Spanish flu killed approximately 25 million people worldwide, far more than had been killed in four years of war. A rigorous quarantine policy was implemented in Australia; although this reduced the immediate impact of the flu, the nation's death toll surpassed 11,500.

When the pandemic struck in 1918, the ships of the Royal Australian Navy were dispersed throughout the world. The speed at which the flu spread, coupled with the cramped mess decks and poorly ventilated living spaces on early 20th century warships, created a favourable environment for the disease. The pandemic swept through the British Grand Fleet in 1918; the Australian cruisers assigned to the fleet suffered high casualties, with up to 157 casualties in one ship alone. Outbreaks in the Mediterranean fleets were more severe than those in the Atlantic. HMAS Brisbane recorded 183 casualties between November and December 1918, of those casualties 2 men died of pneumonia. The RAN lost a total of 26 men to the disease; further loss prevented primarily by the ready availability of professional medical treatment.

=== South Pacific aid mission ===
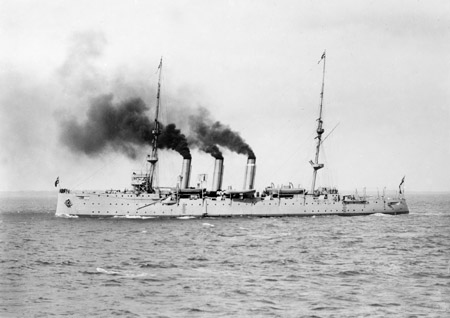
Portside view of the Challenger-class light cruiser HMAS Encounter

The disease arrived in the South Pacific on the cargo vessel SS Talune, which sailed from Auckland on 30 October 1918 whilst knowingly carrying sick passengers. Talune stopped in Fiji, Samoa, Tonga and Nauru: the first outbreaks in these locations occurred within days of the ships visits. The local authorities were generally unprepared for the size of the outbreak, allowing the infection to spread uncontrollably. The German territory of Samoa was the worst affected of the small islands, the New Zealand administration carried out no efforts to lessen the outbreak and rejected offers of assistance from nearby American Samoa. The New Zealand government officially apologised to Samoa in 2002 for their reaction to the outbreak. On 29 November 1918 the military governor of Apia requested assistance from Wellington; the request was turned down because all doctors were needed in New Zealand. Australia offered the only alternate source of aid.

The Commonwealth Naval Board was aware of the worsening situation in the region; the sloop HMAS Fantome reported its first case on 11 November 1918 while stationed in Fiji, with half her complement eventually affected. On 20 November 1918, the Naval Board began forming a joint relief expedition from available military medical personnel. The commanding officer of HMAS Encounter was then ordered to embark the expedition in Sydney and sail as soon as possible. Encounter departed Sydney on 24 November 1918, ten minutes after completing loading. As a precaution, all 450 members of Encounter's crew were doubly inoculated; the ship had suffered 74 cases earlier in the year at Fremantle and the captain did not want a repeat. Encounter arrived in Suva on 30 November and took on half of the available coal and 39 tonnes of water. Spanish flu was rampant in Suva; Captain Thring implemented a strict quarantine, placed guards on the wharf, and ordered that coaling be carried out by the crew instead of native labour. Encounter departed Suva in the evening of the same day and arrived off Apia on 3 December. Within six hours, the medical landing party assigned to Apia and their stores were ashore. Encounter then departed for the Tongan capital of Nukuʻalofa, arriving on 5 December. The last of the medical staff and supplies were unloaded, and Encounter sailed for Suva on 7 December to re-coal. On arriving in Suva, Encounter received orders to return to Sydney, where reached on 17 December and was immediately placed into quarantine. The South Pacific aid mission is regarded as Australia's first overseas relief expedition, and set a precedent for future relief missions conducted by the RAN.

== Between the wars ==
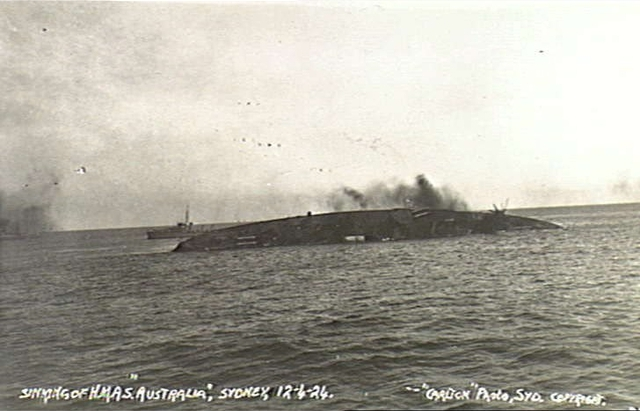
Australia on her side and sinking during her scuttling in April 1924

Following the end of World War I, the Australian Government believed that an immediate evaluation of the RAN was necessary. Australia had based its naval policy on the Henderson Recommendations of 1911, developed by Sir Reginald Henderson. The government sent an invitation to Admiral John Jellicoe, he arrived in Australia in May 1919. Jellicoe remained in Australia for three months, before returning to England via New Zealand and Canada. Jellicoe submitted his findings in August 1919, titled the Report on the Naval Mission to the Commonwealth. The report outlined several policies designed to strengthen British naval strength in the Pacific Ocean. The report heavily stressed a close relationship between the RAN and the Royal Navy. This would be achieved by strict adherence to the procedures and administration methods of the Royal Navy. The report also suggested constant officer exchange between the two forces. Jellicoe also called for the creation of a large Far East Imperial Fleet, which would be based in Singapore and include capital ships and aircraft carriers. The creation cost for this fleet was to be divided between Great Britain, Australia and New Zealand: contributing 75%, 20%, and 5% respectively. The suggested makeup of the RAN would include; one aircraft carrier, two battlecruisers, eight light cruisers, one flotilla leader, twelve destroyers, a destroyer depot ship, eight submarines, one submarine depot ship, and a small number of additional auxiliary ships. The annual cost and depreciation of the fleet was estimated to be £4,024,600. Except for implementing closer ties with the Royal Navy, none of Jellicoe's major recommendations were carried out.

With the end of World War I, the Australian Government began to worry about the threat Japan posed to Australia. Japan had extended its empire 3,000 kilometres (1,900 mi) to the south, bringing it right to Australia's doorstep. Japan had continued to build up its naval force, and had reached the point where it outgunned the Royal Navy in the Pacific. The RAN and the government believed that the possibility of a Japanese invasion was highly likely. In his report, Admiral Jellicoe believed that the threat of a Japanese invasion of Australia would remain as long as the White Australia Policy remained in place. Due to the perceived threat, and bilateral support in Australia for the White Australia Policy, the Australian Government became a vocal supporter of the continuance of the 1902 Anglo-Japanese Alliance. Australia was joined in its support for the alliance by New Zealand but was heavily opposed by Canada, which believed that the alliance had hindered the British Empire's relationship with China and the United States. No decision on the alliance was agreed on, and the discussion was shelved pending the outcome of the Washington Naval Treaty. The results of the treaty, which allowed the British to retain naval supremacy in the Pacific Ocean, created a sense of security in Australia. Many Australians saw the Four Powers Pact as replacing the Anglo-Japanese Alliance. This sense of security became known as the Ten Year Rule. This led to defence retrenchments in Australia, following the international trend, and a £500,000 reduction in expenditure. The governor-general Henry Forster when opening parliament on 22 June 1922 was quoted as saying:

In view of the result of attained at the Washington Treaty which, my advisors believe, guarantee peace in the Pacific for some time to come, it is proposed to reduce the establishment of the navy and army, and postpone the expansion of the air force.

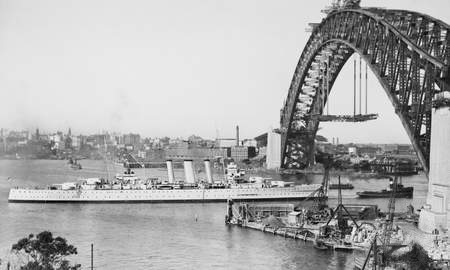
HMAS Canberra entering Sydney Harbour in 1930

Between World War I and World War II, the Royal Australian Navy underwent a severe reduction in ships and manpower. As a result of the Washington Naval Treaty, the flagship HMAS Australia was scrapped with her main armaments and sunk outside Sydney Heads in 1924. In the same year, the RAN began a five-year program of obtaining new ships from Britain: the heavy cruisers Australia and Canberra and the seaplane carrier Albatross. This purchase was partly paid for by scrapping Brisbane, Melbourne, Sydney, and most of the destroyers. The Great Depression of 1929 led to another reduction of manpower; although reduced in size, the available posts were easily filled as many men were unemployed and the offered pay was greater than most jobs. The RAN's personnel strength fell to 3,117 personnel, plus 131 members of the Naval Auxiliary Services. By 1932, the strength of the Reserves stood at 5,446. In the early 1930s, lack of funds forced the transfer of the Royal Australian Naval College from Jervis Bay to Flinders Naval Depot in Victoria. In 1933 the Australian Government ordered three light cruisers; HMA Ships Perth, Hobart, and Sydney; selling the seaplane carrier Albatross to fund Hobart. During this time, the RAN also purchased destroyers of the V and W destroyer classes, the ships that would become known as the Scrap Iron Flotilla. With the ever-increasing threat of Germany and Japan in the late 1930s, the RAN was not in the position it was at the outbreak of World War I.

== World War II ==
Australia declared war on Nazi Germany one hour after the United Kingdom's declaration of war on 3 September 1939. Unlike the arrangements with the British Admiralty at the start of the First World War, during World War II RAN ships remained under Australian command.

Ship type	Sept. 1939	June 1945
Heavy cruisers	2	2
Light cruisers	4	2
Destroyers	5	11
Frigates	0	6
Sloops	2	2
Corvettes	0	53
Landing ship infantry	0	3
Anti-submarine auxiliaries	0	3
Auxiliary Minesweepers	0	6
Minelayers	0	1
Replenishment oilers	0	1
Combat stores ships	0	12
Repair ships	0	3
Net laying ships	0	10
Tugs	0(?)	6
Cable repair ships	0	2
Survey ships	0(?)	9
Motor Launches	0	33
Harbour Defence Motor Launches	0	28
Air Sea Rescue vessels	0	20
Auxiliary patrol boats	0	75
Services reconnaissance	0	8
Other vessels	0(?)	41
Total	13(?)	337

At the onset of war the RAN was relatively modest, even if it was arguably the most combat-ready of the three services. Major units included:

- two County-class heavy cruisers; Australia and Canberra, both carried 8-inch (203 mm) guns and had entered service in the 1920s
- three modern Modified Leander-class light cruisers; Hobart, Perth, and Sydney, which mounted 6-inch (152 mm) guns
- the older Town-class cruiser Adelaide
- four sloops, Parramatta, Swan, Warrego, and Yarra; although only Swan and Yarra were in commission
- five V-class destroyers
- a variety of support and ancillary craft

Following the call up of reserves in 1939 the permanent forces grew from 5,440 to 10,259.

During the war the men and vessels of the RAN served in every theatre of operations, from the tropical Pacific to the frigid Russian convoys and grew exponentially. The table illustrates the growth of the RAN between the outbreak of war on 3 September 1939 and 30 June 1945.

=== Operations against Italy, Vichy France and Germany ===
From mid-1940, ships of the RAN, at the request of the Admiralty, began to deploy to the Mediterranean Sea to take part in the Battle of the Mediterranean against Nazi Germany and Fascist Italy. In September 1939, the Admiralty and the Australian Commonwealth Naval Board agreed to deploy the RAN Destroyer Flotilla outside the Australia Station; the five ships of what was to become known as the Scrap Iron Flotilla arrived at Malta in mid-December. HMAS Sydney deployed in May 1940 and was later joined by Hobart. When Italy declared war on 10 June 1940, the Australian warships made up five of the twenty-two Allied destroyers and one of the five modern light cruisers on station in the Mediterranean. The RAN then offered the services of Australia to the Admiralty, and was accepted. When Australia arrived in the Mediterranean, the RAN had sent nearly the entire combat fleet to the Northern Hemisphere, leaving Australia open to possible attack.

The entry of Italy into the war also lead to a far more active role for the few remaining RAN vessels on the Australian Station. Indeed, on 12 June 1940, after a prolonged chase, the Armed Merchant Cruiser (AMC) HMAS Manoora forced the Italian merchant ship Romolo (9,780 tons) to scuttle south-west of Nauru.

On 27 June 1940, Admiral Cunningham commander of the Mediterranean Fleet ordered the 7th Cruiser Squadron, which included HMAS Sydney, to rendezvous with an Egypt-bound convoy near Cape Matapan. The cruiser squadron sighted three Italian destroyers at 18.00 on 28 June 1940 and immediately engaged them. Within an hour, the Espero was incapacitated and Sydney was signalled to sink her. As Sydney approached, Espero launched torpedoes, but failed to hit any targets. Sydney fired four salvos, scoring ten direct hits on Espero. Sydney remained at the scene for two hours picking up survivors.

Also on 27 June 1940, the Console Generale Liuzzi was scuttled south of Crete after being depth-charged by HMAS Voyager and the British destroyers Dainty, Ilex, Decoy, and Defender. On 29 June 1940, another Italian submarine, the Uebi Scebeli, was sunk west of Crete by the same ships.

On 7 July 1940, a 25-ship fleet departed Alexandria, intending to meet a convoy east of Malta. The next day, a submarine sighted an Italian fleet 500 miles (800 km) away; the Allied fleet altered course to intercept. The two fleets sighted each other at 15.00 on 9 July 1940, and a battle that became known as the Battle of Calabria began. Four vessels of the RAN took part in the battle; HMA Ships Sydney, Stuart, Vampire, and Voyager. Sydney was the first RAN vessel to engage the enemy, and at 15.20 opened fire on an Italian cruiser. When the Italian fleet began to withdraw, the Allied destroyer squadron was ordered forward. Stuart, leading the destroyer force, was the first to open fire; her opening salvo was a direct hit at a range of 12,600 yards (11,500 m). Both fleets retired, with the Italians withdrawing under smoke, but Italian aircraft continued to attack Allied ships. Sydney, which came under heavy air attack, was believed to have sunk. The fleet arrived back in Alexandria on 13 July.

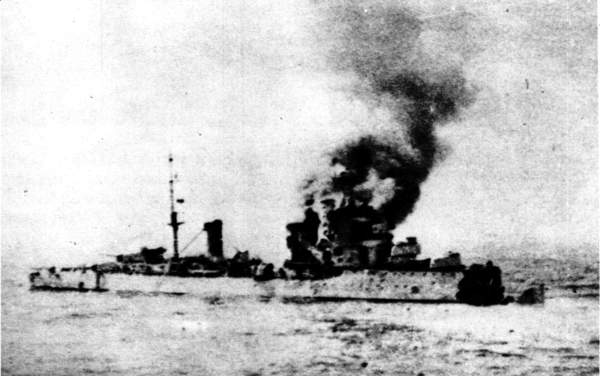
Bartolomeo Colleoni sinking, 19 July 1940

On 17 July 1940, HMAS Sydney and the destroyer HMS Havock were ordered to support a Royal Navy destroyer squadron on a sweep north of the island of Crete. At 07.20 on 19 July, the Italian cruisers Giovanni dalle Bande Nere and Bartolomeo Colleoni, which opened fire seven minutes later. The four British destroyers retreated to the north-east, while Sydney and Havock, 40 miles (60 km) away, began to close in. Sydney sighted the cruisers at 08.29, and fired the first shots of the Battle of Cape Spada at a range of 17,360 metres (56,960 ft). Within minutes, Sydney had successfully damaged Bande Nere, and when the Italians withdrew to the south, the six Allied ships pursued. At 0848, with Bande Nere hiding behind a smoke screen, Sydney shifted her fire to Bartolomeo Colleoni, which was disabled by 0933. The Australian cruiser left to pursue Bande Nere, but broke off at 10.27 as the Italian warship was out of range, and Sydney was dangerously low on ammunition. The only damage to Sydney during the battle was caused by a shell at 09.21, which knocked a hole in the forward funnel, and wounded a sailor through splinter damage.

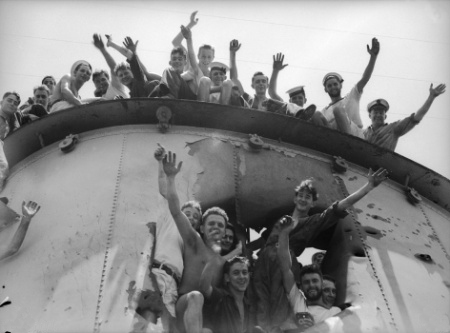
Sailors from Sydney posing around and in the forward funnel shellhole

On 30 September 1940, HMAS Stuart destroyed the Italian 600-Serie Adua class submarine Gondar, killing two of its crew. Twenty-eight survivors was subsequently rescued by Stuart, with a further nineteen picked up by other vessels.

On 27 March 1941, an Allied fleet under Admiral Cunningham was ambushed by an Italian naval force off Cape Matapan, Greece. Three vessels of the RAN took part in the battle; HMA Ships Perth, Stuart, and Vampire. The victory at Cape Matapan allowed the evacuation of thousands of Allied troops from Crete.

HMAS Parramatta was torpedoed and sunk on 27 November 1941 by U-559 whilst escorting transports resupplying the Allied garrison at Tobruk. There were 24 survivors, but 138 men, including all officers, lost their lives.

The Australians experienced further success on 15 December 1941 when HMAS Nestor attacked and sank the German submarine U-127 off Cape St. Vincent, Portugal.

==== West Africa ====
On 6 September 1940, HMAS Australia was ordered to sail to Freetown, Sierra Leone to join Operation Menace, the invasion of Vichy French-controlled Dakar in French West Africa. On 19 September, Australia and the cruiser HMS Cumberland sighted three Vichy cruisers heading south and shadowed them. When the French cruiser Gloire developed engine trouble, Australia escorted her towards Casablanca and returned to the fleet two days later. On 23 September Australia came under heavy fire from shore batteries, then drove two Vichy destroyers back into port. Australia then engaged and sunk the destroyer L'Audacieux with eight salvos in sixteen minutes. Over the next two days French and Allied forces exchanged fire; Australia was struck twice and lost her Walrus amphibian. Australia and the rest of the fleet retired on 25 September the battle became known as the Battle of Dakar.

==== The "Scrap-Iron Flotilla" ====
The Scrap Iron Flotilla was an Australian destroyer group that operated in the Mediterranean and Pacific during World War II. The name was bestowed upon the group by Nazi Propaganda Minister Joseph Goebbels who described the fleet as a "consignment of junk" and "Australia's Scrap-Iron Flotilla". The flotilla consisted of five vessels; Scott-class destroyer HMAS Stuart, which acted as flotilla leader, and four V-class destroyers; Vampire, Vendetta, Voyager, Waterhen. The ships were all built to fight in World War I, and were slow and poorly armed compared to newer ships. The five destroyers—the entirety of the RAN's destroyer force—departed Australia in November 1939 destined for Singapore where they carried out anti-submarine exercises with the Royal Navy submarine HMS Rover. On 13 November 1939, the flotilla left Singapore for the Mediterranean Sea, following a request from the Admiralty for assistance.

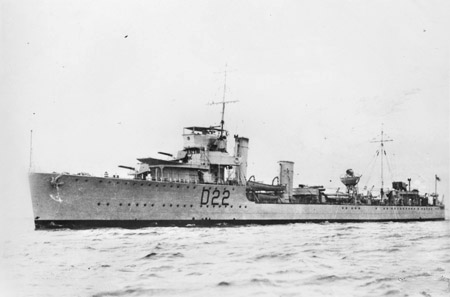
HMAS Waterhen

The Australian destroyer flotilla took part in multiple actions while in the Mediterranean, including the Allied evacuation following the battle of Greece in April 1941, though the flotilla came to fame in the mission to resupply the besieged city of Tobruk. The resupply routes from Alexandria and Mersa Matruh to Tobruk became known as "Bomb Alley" and was subject to constant Axis air attacks. The flotilla, which by this time was in poor condition, managed to make 138 supply runs to Tobruk, carrying in ammunition and stores and taking out wounded soldiers. On 28 May 1941 Vampire became the first of the flotilla to leave the Mediterranean. Vendetta, the last to leave, sailed in October 1941.

Of the five destroyers, three were lost during the war; Waterhen was sunk in the Mediterranean on 30 June 1941, Vampire was sunk by Japanese aircraft during the Indian Ocean Raid and Voyager ran aground at Betano, during the Timor campaign and was abandoned.

==== Red Sea ====
As well as serving in the Mediterranean Sea, ships of the RAN also served in the Red Sea. In August 1940, Italian forces invaded British Somaliland. After a fighting withdrawal, the small British garrison was evacuated from Berbera, with HMAS Hobart assisting in the destruction of the port and its facilities. To aid in the delaying action, Hobart sent a 3-pounder gun ashore, operated by volunteers from the crew. The seamen were captured by the Italians, but were later liberated. Two RAN sloops joined the Red Sea force in 1940: Parramatta on 30 July and Yarra in September. In October, Yarra engaged and drove off two Italian destroyers attempting to raid a convoy. Although vessels of the RAN served in the Red Sea throughout the war, after 1941 the larger RAN ships were deployed to Australian waters in response to the threat from Japan.

==== Loss of HMAS Sydney ====
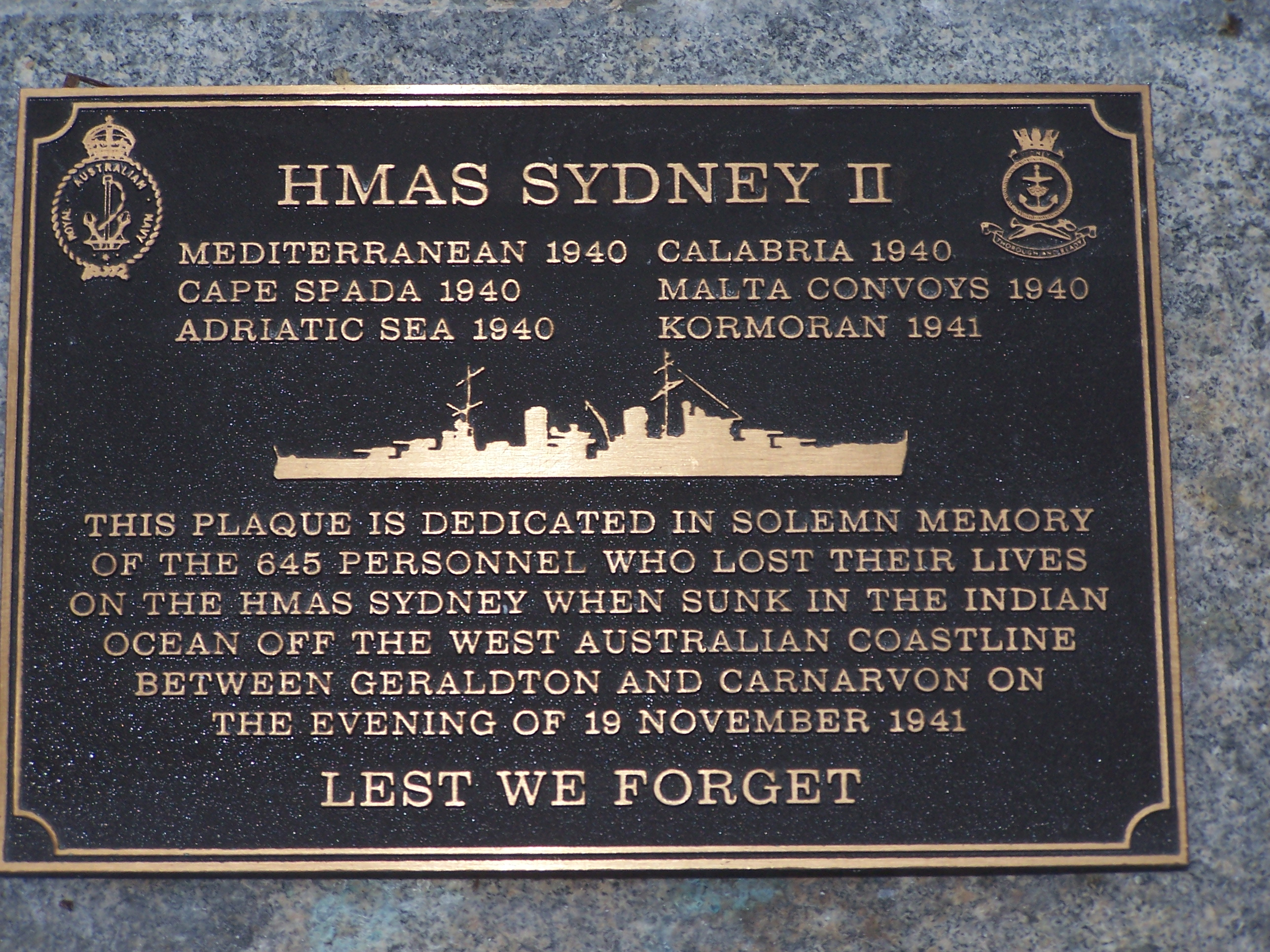
Memorial to HMAS Sydney at the state war memorial in Western Australia

On 19 November 1941, the Australian light cruiser HMAS Sydney and the German auxiliary cruiser Kormoran engaged each other in the Indian Ocean, off Western Australia. The two ships sank each other: Sydney was lost with all 645 hands, while the majority of the Kormoran's crew were rescued and became prisoners of war. The location of both wrecks remained a mystery to many and subject to much controversy until 16–17 March 2008, when both ships were found.

==== North Africa ====
RAN units continued to serve in the Mediterranean campaign, with HMAS Quiberon, taking part in Operation Torch, the invasion of North Africa. On 28 November 1942 Quiberon assisted in sinking the Italian submarine Dessiè and three days later also took part in the destruction of a four-ship convoy and a destroyer.

==== Sicily 1943 ====
During early 1943, eight Australian-designed and built Bathurst-class corvettes were transferred to Egypt from the Indian Ocean, in preparation for Operation Husky, the Allied invasion of Sicily. They were part of a 3,000-ship Allied force. The corvettes arrived in the Mediterranean in May and were formed into the 21st and 22nd Minesweeping Flotillas. All eight ships survived the campaign without damage or casualties sustained in action, although HMAS Maryborough experienced a near-miss from a German bomber. When the captain of HMAS Gawler enquired what damage had been sustained, the response from Maryborough read: "no damage except to my underpants".

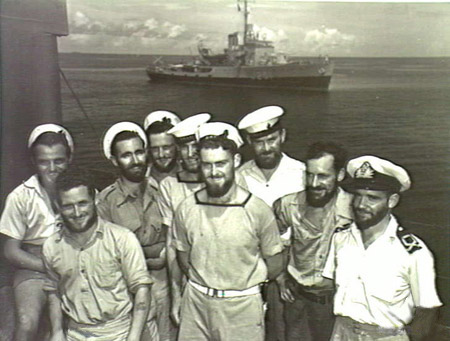
Australian sailors with a Bathurst-class corvette in the background. The RAN commissioned 56 of this class of corvettes during World War II.

=== War with Japan ===
After the Imperial Japanese Navy's attacks on the Allies in December 1941, the RAN redeployed its larger ships to home waters to protect the Australian mainland from Japanese attack, while several smaller ships remained in the Mediterranean. From 1940 onwards, there was considerable Axis naval activity in Australian waters first from German commerce raiders and submarines and later by the Imperial Japanese Navy.

Initially, RAN ships served as part of the British-Australian component of the American-British-Dutch-Australian Command (ABDACOM) naval forces or in the ANZAC Force. ABDACOM was wound up following the fall of the Netherlands East Indies and was succeeded by the South West Pacific Area (command) (SWPA). The United States Seventh Fleet was formed at Brisbane on 15 March 1943, for service in the SWPA. RAN ships in the Pacific generally served at part of Seventh Fleet taskforces.

==== Timor ====
From February 1942, the RAN played a critical role in resupplying Australian and Dutch commandos on Timor. Voyager was not the only loss during the campaign. On 1 December 1942, HMAS Armidale was attacked by thirteen Japanese aircraft while attempting to land Dutch soldiers off Betano, Portuguese Timor. Armidale sank with the loss of 40 of her crew and 60 Dutch personnel. During the engagement, Ordinary Seaman Teddy Sheean operated an Oerlikon anti-aircraft gun and was wounded by strafing Japanese planes, he went down with the ship, still strapped into the gun and still shooting at the attacking aircraft.

==== Java Sea ====
On 28 February 1942, a joint ABDA naval force met a Japanese invasion force in the Java Sea. The Leander-class cruiser HMAS Perth and the American heavy cruiser USS Houston fought in and survived the Battle of the Java Sea.

On 1 March 1942, the Perth and Houston attempted to move through the Sunda Strait to Tjilatjap however they found their path blocked by the main Japanese invasion fleet from western Java. The Allied ships were engaged by at least three cruisers and several destroyers and in a ferocious night action, known as the Battle of Sunda Strait, both Perth and Houston were torpedoed and sunk. Casualties aboard Perth included 350 crew and 3 civilians killed, while 324 survived the sinking and were taken prisoner by the Japanese (106 of whom later died in captivity). The loss of Perth so soon after the sinking of her sister Sydney, had a major psychological effect on the Australian people. Japanese losses included a minesweeper and a troop transport sunk by friendly fire, whilst three other transports were damaged and had to be beached.

==== Coral Sea ====
On 2 May 1942, two ships of the RAN were part of the Allied force in the Battle of the Coral Sea; HMA Ships Australia and Hobart as part of Task Force 44. Both ships came under intense air attack, while part of a force guarding the approaches to Port Moresby.

==== The defence of Australian shipping ====
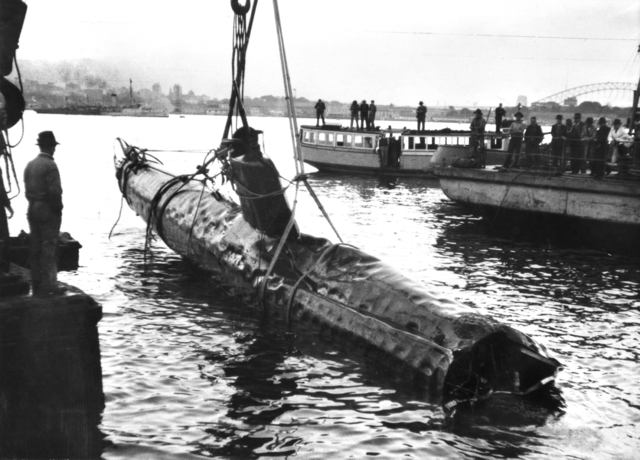
A Japanese Ko-hyoteki-class midget submarine, believed to be Midget No. 14, is raised from Sydney Harbour

In late May and early June 1942, a group of five Imperial Japanese Navy submarines made a series of attacks on Sydney and the nearby port of Newcastle. On the night of 31 May – 1 June, the submarines launched three Ko-hyoteki-class midget submarines against Allied shipping in Sydney Harbour. A torpedo intended for the cruiser USS Chicago exploded under the depot ship HMAS Kuttabul, killing 21. On 8 June, two of the submarines shelled Sydney and Newcastle, with little effect. In response, the RAN instituted convoys between Brisbane and Adelaide. All ships of over 1,200 tons and with speeds of less than 12 knots (22 km/h; 14 mph) were required to sail in convoy when travelling between cities on the east coast.

The attack on Sydney and Newcastle marked the start of a sustained Japanese submarine campaign against Australia. During 1942, Japanese submarines sank 17 ships in Australian waters, although none of these ships were sailing as part of a convoy. 16 ships were sunk in Australian waters during 1943, before the Japanese ended the campaign in July. Five of these ships were sunk while sailing in escorted convoys. The Australian naval authorities gradually dismantled the coastal convoy system between December 1943 and March 1944. By the end of the war, the RAAF and RAN had escorted over 1,100 convoys along the Australian coastline.

While the scale of the Japanese naval offensive directed against Australia was small compared to other naval campaigns of the war such as the Battle of the Atlantic, these attacks were "the most comprehensive and widespread series of offensive operations ever conducted by an enemy against Australia". Although the RAN only sank a single full-sized Japanese submarine in Australian waters (I-124 in January 1942) convoy escorts may have successfully reduced the threat to shipping in Australian waters by making it harder for Japanese submarines to carry out attacks.

Whilst escorting convoys between Australia and New Guinea, HMAS Arunta attacked and sank the Japanese Kaichu type submarine Ro-33 off Port Moresby on 24 August 1942, killing all 42 men aboard.

==== Loss of HMAS Canberra ====
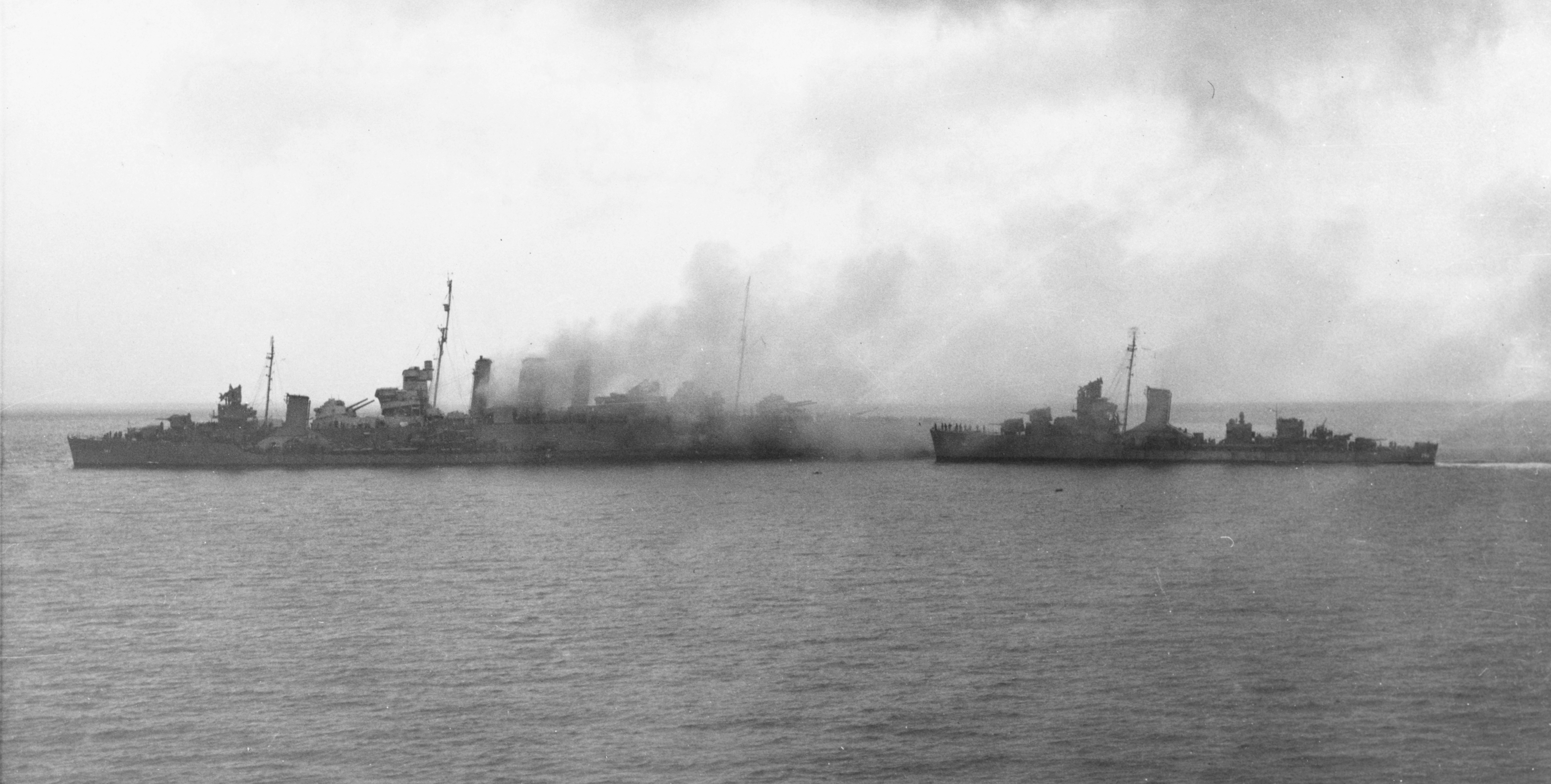
American destroyers evacuating the crew of HMAS Canberra after the Battle of Savo Island

The loss of HMAS Canberra at the Battle of Savo Island in August 1942 was the largest single ship loss the RAN experienced during World War II. In the early hours of the morning of 9 August 1942, Canberra was severely damaged off Guadalcanal in a surprise attack by a powerful Japanese naval force. Canberra was hit by 24 shells in less than two minutes, with 84 of her crew killed, including Captain Frank Getting. Following an order to abandon ship, Canberra was sunk the next day by a torpedo from a US destroyer, to prevent it being captured.

The loss of Canberra, following the losses of Sydney and Perth, attracted unprecedented international attention and sympathy for the RAN. US President Franklin D. Roosevelt wished to commemorate the loss of Canberra and requested that a US heavy cruiser under construction be named Canberra. USS Canberra was launched on 19 April 1943. The British Government approved the transfer of HMS Shropshire to the RAN as a replacement, and the ship was commissioned as HMAS Shropshire on 20 April 1943.

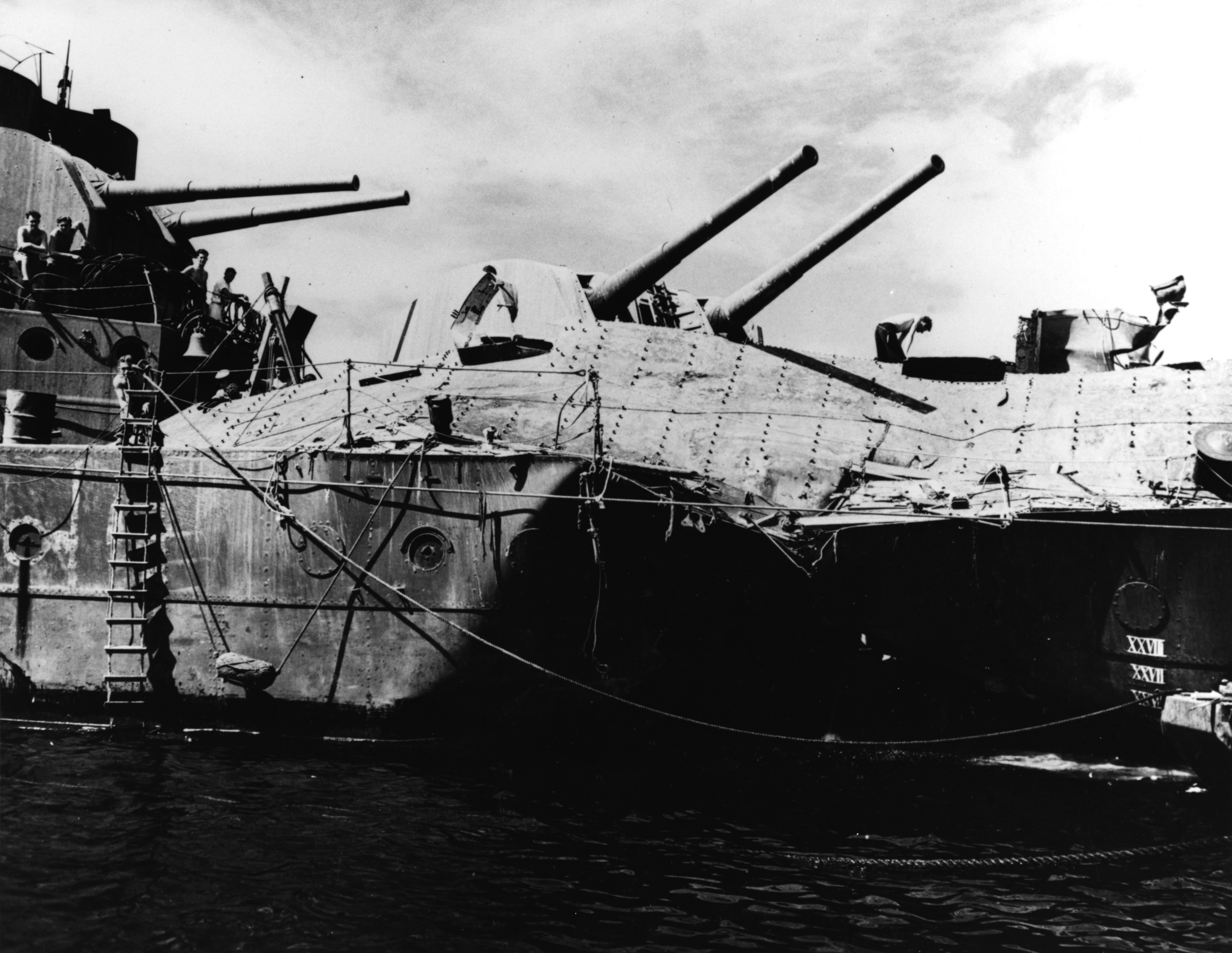
The light cruiser HMAS Hobart showing torpedo damage inflicted by a Japanese submarine on 20 July 1943. Hobart did not return to service until December 1944.

==== Leyte Gulf and Lingayen Gulf ====
Between 23 and 25 October 1944 four RAN warships – HMA Ships Australia, Shropshire, Arunta, and Warramunga – took part in the Battle of Leyte Gulf, one of the largest naval battles in history. In the lead-up, on 21 October, Australia became the first Allied ship to be hit by a kamikaze aircraft near Leyte Island. Gunners from Australia and Shropshire fired at, and reportedly hit, an unidentified Japanese aircraft. The plane then flew away from the ships, before turning and flying into Australia, striking the ship's superstructure above the bridge, and spewing burning fuel and debris over a large area, before falling into the sea. A 200-kilogram (440 lb) bomb carried by the plane failed to explode; if it had, the ship might have been effectively destroyed. At least 30 crew members died as a result of the attack, including the commanding officer, Captain Emile Dechaineux; among the wounded was Commodore John Collins, the Australian force commander. Australia remained on duty, but on 25 October, was hit again and was forced to retire to the New Hebrides for repairs.

Shropshire and Arunta remained at Leyte and were part of the United States Seventh Fleet Support Force at the Battle of Surigao Strait on 25 October. During this action both ships contributed to the sinking of the Japanese battleship Yamashiro, with Shropshire firing thirty-two eight-gun broadsides into the battleship with her 8-inch guns in a period of 14 minutes.

HMAS Australia returned to combat at the Battle of Lingayen Gulf in January 1945. During the battle Australia was repeatedly attacked between 5–9 January, suffering significant damage which forced it to retire once more.

==== Ships with British fleets 1942–1945 ====
In 1940–1942, five N class and two Q class were built in the UK and commissioned into the RAN for service with the British Eastern Fleet: HMA Ships Napier, Nepal, Nestor, Nizam, Norman, Quiberon, and Quickmatch. These ships were predominantly crewed by RAN personnel, although they were often commanded by British officers and remained the property of the British government.

Following the Japanese raid on Ceylon of March–April 1942, the Eastern Fleet was transferred from its base at Trincomalee, to the other side of the Indian Ocean: Kilindi in Kenya. From there the fleet undertook local patrols, escorted convoys and occasionally despatched ships to operations in the Mediterranean. During Operation Vigorous, a convoy to Malta in June 1942, Nestor was serious damaged in an air raid and slowly sank.

On 11 February 1944 the corvettes HMA Ships Ipswich and Launceston, in conjunction with the Indian sloop Jumna, sank the Japanese submarine Ro-110 in the Bay of Bengal after the latter had torpedoed a ship in a Calcutta-bound convoy.

From late 1944, Nepal, Norman and Quiberon were transferred, along with many other Eastern Fleet ships, to the new British Pacific Fleet (BPF). Among other operations with the BPF, they took part in the Battle of Okinawa.

In late 1945, following the end of hostilities, the RAN acquired three more Q-class destroyers: Queenborough, Quality, and Quadrant.

=== The end of the war 1945 ===
By the end of World War II, the RAN's combat strength numbered 150 ships with an additional 200 auxiliary craft with the service reaching its peak in June 1945, when it ranks swelled to 39,650 personnel. During the six years of war, the RAN lost three cruisers, four destroyers, two sloops, a corvette, and an auxiliary minesweeper to enemy action. Casualties included 1,740 personnel from the 19 ships sunk, and another 436 personnel killed aboard other ships or at other posts. By most measures, such losses were heavy for such a small service, representing over half its pre-war strength in ships and one-fifth in men. Against this the RAN destroyed one cruiser, an armed merchant raider, three destroyers or torpedo boats, a minesweeper, many light craft and seven submarines. It also destroyed or captured more than 150,000 tons of Axis merchant shipping and shot down more than a hundred aircraft. Although difficult to quantify the RAN also played a role in numerous other successes.

==== Surrender and occupation of Japan ====
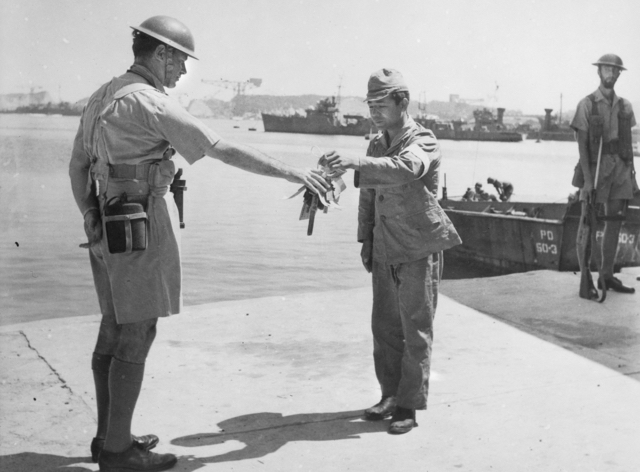
30 August 1945. Yokosuka Naval Base, Tokyo Bay. Commander Yuzo Tanno hands over the keys of Yokosuka Naval Base to Captain H. J. Buchanan, Royal Australian Navy. Buchanan led the first Commonwealth party to go ashore in Japan.

Ten RAN vessels were present at the signing of the Japanese surrender in Tokyo Bay on 2 September 1945; HMA Ships Ballarat, Cessnock, Gascoyne, Hobart, Ipswich, Napier, Nizam, Pirie, Shropshire, and Warramunga. Following the surrender ceremony, the majority of the RAN vessels left Japanese waters for other duties. As part of the surrender agreement, Japan agreed to an Allied occupation and disarmament. On 17 August 1945, the Australian Government agreed to provide two cruisers and two destroyers for service with the British Commonwealth Occupation Force (BCOF). A total of 15 RAN ships served with the BCOF, the ships performed a variety of tasks but were mainly employed on the Kyushu Patrol, preventing Korean nationals from illegally entering Japan.

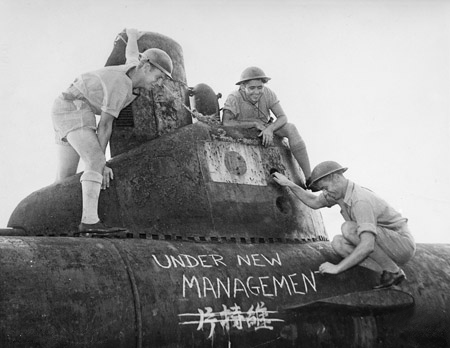
Australian sailors take possession of a midget submarine at a Japanese naval base near Tokyo in September 1945.

The RAN also played a role in the disarmament of Japan, assisting in the scuttling of former Imperial Japanese Navy ships, in one instance Quiberon took part in the sinking of seven submarines of Kyushu as part of Operation Bottom. When Indian and New Zealand contingents began to withdraw from the BCOF, the operation became a predominantly Australian operation. In 1948, Kure naval base was turned over to Australia, and became known as HMAS Commonwealth. When North Korea invaded South Korea on 25 June 1950, one RAN ship was on station as part of BCOF. The Australian Government immediately offered HMAS Shoalhaven for United Nations service. Eventually, all RAN ships in the area were transferred to the command of British Commonwealth Forces Korea (BCFK).

Clearing mines from Australian and New Guinean waters was another focus for the RAN in the years after the war. Minesweeping began in December 1945 and was conducted by HMAS Swan, eight Bathurst-class corvettes and several smaller craft from a base at Cairns. The work was arduous and dangerous, and HMAS Warrnambool was sunk with the loss of four men killed and another 25 wounded when she struck a mine off North Queensland on 13 September 1947. The RAN completed this task in August 1948 after sweeping 1,816 mines.

== Cold War ==
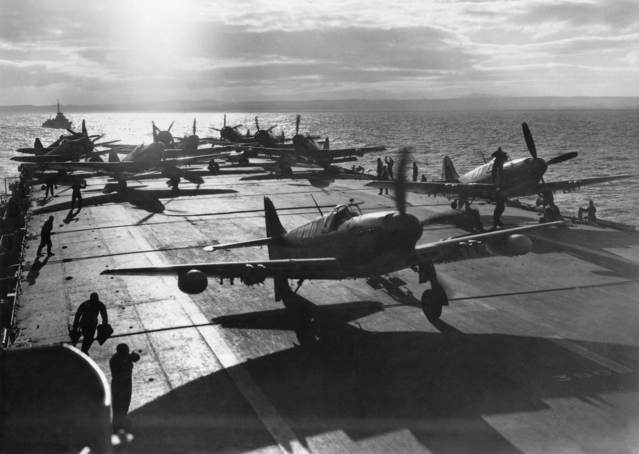
Fairey Firefly aircraft on board HMAS Sydney off Korea, during the Korean War.

Following World War II, the RAN reduced its surface fleet but continued to expand in other ways, acquiring two Royal Navy Majestic-class aircraft carriers then under construction (HMAS Melbourne and HMAS Sydney) to build up a Fleet Air Arm. In the 1960s, the RAN began to move away from British-designed ships; the last major British design used was the Type 12 frigate, which formed the basis of the River-class frigates.

When it was decided that the RAN should commission a destroyer armed with guided missiles, the obvious British design was the County class; however, the RAN had reservations regarding the gas turbine propulsion, the Seaslug missile system, and the ability to adapt the design to Australian needs. Instead, the Australian government chose the United States-built, steam turbine-powered Charles F. Adams-class destroyer, armed with the Tartar missile as the basis for its Perth class, the first major US warship design chosen for the RAN.

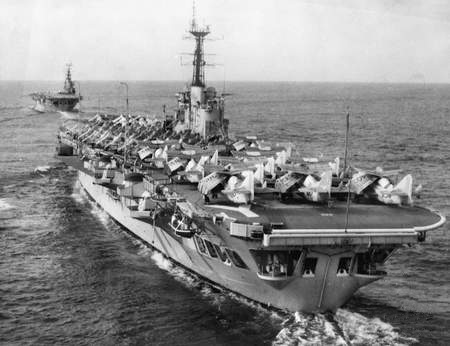
HMAS Sydney leading HMAS Melbourne

By the mid-late 1960s, the RAN was at the zenith of its operational capabilities; it was capable of dispatching a full carrier battle group in support of major operations by having in service an aircraft carrier (HMAS Melbourne), three large area defence destroyers of the Perth class, six modern River-class frigates and four Oberon-class submarines.

With the retreat of British forces west of the Suez Canal in the 1960s, the RAN began to take a more defensive role, and in co-operation with the United States, allied though the ANZUS treaty. The RAN saw service in many of the world's post war conflicts, including Korea, Vietnam, and the Indonesian Confrontation.

=== Korea ===
On 27 June 1950, the United Nations Security Council called on member nations to aid South Korea. On 29 June, Prime Minister Robert Menzies announced that the frigate HMAS Shoalhaven, stationed in Japan, and the destroyer HMAS Bataan, in Hong Kong, would be placed under UN command in Korea. On 1 July, one day after President Truman committed American ground forces to Korea, the first Australian operation in Korea took place; Shoalhaven escorted an American ammunition ship from Japan to Pusan.

The destroyer Warramunga was deployed in July 1950, and provided gunfire support during the X Corps landing at Wonsan in October. In December, Bataan and Warramunga assisted the mass evacuation of troops and refugees from Hungnam. The aircraft carrier Sydney was deployed to Korea between September 1951 and January 1952—the first carrier owned by a Commonwealth Dominion to see wartime service. During this time, 2,366 sorties were flown from Sydney, with only fifteen aircraft lost and three pilots killed.

Over the course of the Korean War, nine ships of the RAN participated in the naval blockade of North Korea.

=== Malaya ===
The Malayan Emergency was declared on 18 June 1948, prompted by a rise in Malayan Communist guerrillas in Malaya (later Malaysia). Australia, as a member of the Southeast Asia Treaty Organization, first deployed two RAAF squadrons to the region in 1950. In 1955, the Far East Strategic Reserve was created as a concentration of Commonwealth military forces (primarily British, New Zealand, and Australian) in Malaya for the protection of that nation from communist threats. Australia's commitment included two destroyers or frigates on station at any time, plus an annual visit by an aircraft carrier, and additional ships as needed. Training for the potentiality of war was the main occurrence for ships deployed to the Strategic Reserve, with RAN personnel gaining experience in working as part of a larger naval organisation.

The first ships of the RAN to arrive in the area were the Tribal-class destroyers Warramunga and Arunta in June 1955. Between 1955 and 1960, eleven other ships of the RAN operated with the Strategic Reserve: Anzac, Melbourne, Quadrant, Queenborough, Quiberon, Quickmatch, Sydney Tobruk,Vampire, Vendetta, and Voyager.

=== Indonesia ===
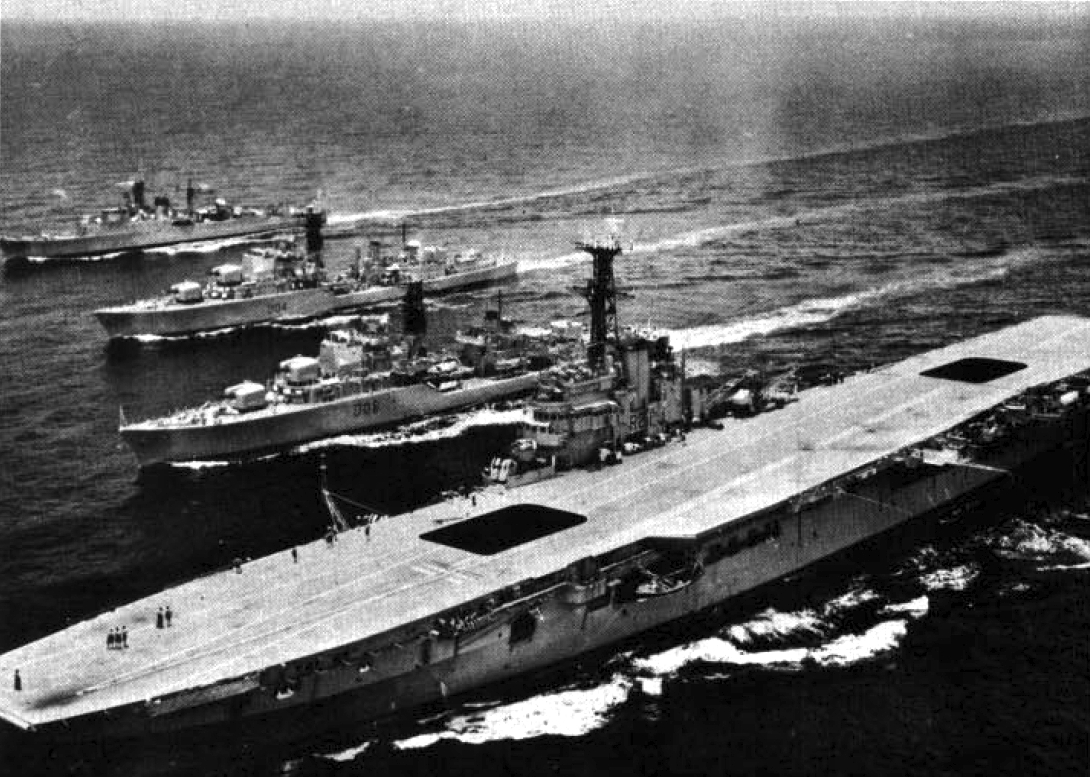
Melbourne with Vendetta, Voyager and Queenborough, circa 1962

In response to the Indonesian invasion of Borneo and Malaya in 1963, Australia increased its presence in the region. At the outbreak of hostilities, the RAN frigates Yarra and Parramatta were on duty in the area. As tension mounted, Australia increased its presence by sending Sydney, Vampire, Vendetta, Duchess, and Derwent to the area. On 19 May 1964, the 16th Minesweeping Squadron, comprising six Ton-class minesweepers, was also deployed.

On 13 December 1964, the minesweeper HMAS Teal was fired upon with automatic weapons by an unlit vessel whilst operating as part of the Singapore Strait patrol. The vessel was overpowered and arrested by Teal, following a further small arms engagement that resulted in the deaths of three Indonesian crew members. On 23 February 1965, Teal was again involved in another engagement, she detected an unlit vessel off Cape Rachado. The suspicious vessel was closed on and illuminated, and revealed nine armed men in uniform who surrendered immediately upon challenge. On 13 March 1964, HMAS Hawk became the second vessel of the 16th Minesweeping Squadron to see action, when she was fired on by an Indonesian shore battery while patrolling off Raffles Lighthouse. Eleven high-explosive rounds were fired at the ship, some landing within 200 yards (200 m) of the vessel, and Hawk withdrew from the area at speed. The following morning, Hawk intercepted a sampan with five Indonesians on board who were promptly arrested.

When Indonesian forces crossed the border into Sebatik Island, Sabah on 28 June 1965, HMAS Yarra was called on to carry out bombardments disrupting the withdrawal of the Indonesians. Yarra carried out two more bombardments of the border area on 5 and 10 July. During three runs, Yarra fired a total of 70 rounds on the enemy. On 13 August 1966, an agreement between Indonesia and Malaysia brought an end to the conflict.

=== Melbourne-Voyager collision ===
HMAS Melbourne following the collision with HMAS Voyager on 10 February 1964

During the night of 10 February 1964, the worst peacetime disaster in the RAN's history occurred when the destroyer HMAS Voyager was cut in two by the bow of the aircraft carrier HMAS Melbourne, killing 82 of the 293 men on board Voyager. Melbourne was conducting air group exercises off Jervis Bay with Voyager acting as the plane guard destroyer. After a series of manoeuvres to reverse the course of the ships, Voyager ended up to starboard of Melbourne, and was ordered to resume her position (behind the carrier and to port) at 20.52. Instead of turning away from Melbourne, Voyager unexpectedly turned towards the carrier, and did not alter course until it was too late. At 20.56, Melbourne's bow hit the destroyer just behind the bridge, and cut her in half, with the bow sinking quickly. The search for survivors went on through the night; of the 314 aboard, 14 officers, 67 sailors, and 1 civilian dockyard worker were killed, including Captain Duncan Stevens.

Following the collision Prime Minister Menzies ordered a Royal Commission to investigate the event. The Commissioner concluded that the collision was primarily the fault of Voyager's bridge crew not maintaining an effective lookout, but also placed blame on Melbourne's Captain John Robertson (who resigned shortly after) and two other officers for failing to alert Voyager or take effective measures to avoid collision. The handling of the Royal Commission was seen as poor, and after a combination of public pressure and claims that Stevens had a drinking problem, a second Royal Commission was announced: the only time two Commissions have been held for the same incident. The second Royal Commission found that Stevens was likely medically unfit for command, that some of the first Commission's conclusions were therefore incorrect, and the Melbourne officers were not at fault. The two commissions caused great anguish in the hierarchy of the RAN, which was not accustomed to such tight scrutiny, and led to the eventual dismantling of the Naval Board's isolation from the civilian world.

=== Vietnam War ===
Ships of the Royal Australian Navy were stationed on continuous operational service in Vietnam between 1965 and 1972; a total 18 ships served in Vietnam waters during the war. During this period, the navy performed a wide variety of operational tasks at sea, ashore, and in the air. The RAN's primary contribution consisted of destroyers, Fleet Air Arm personnel attached to a United States Army helicopter company and No. 9 Squadron RAAF, a Clearance Diving Team, and a logistical support force consisting of transport and escort ships. Other RAN personnel served ashore in medical teams or performed staff duties at the Australian Embassy in Saigon or the 1st Australian Task Force Headquarters at Nui Dat.

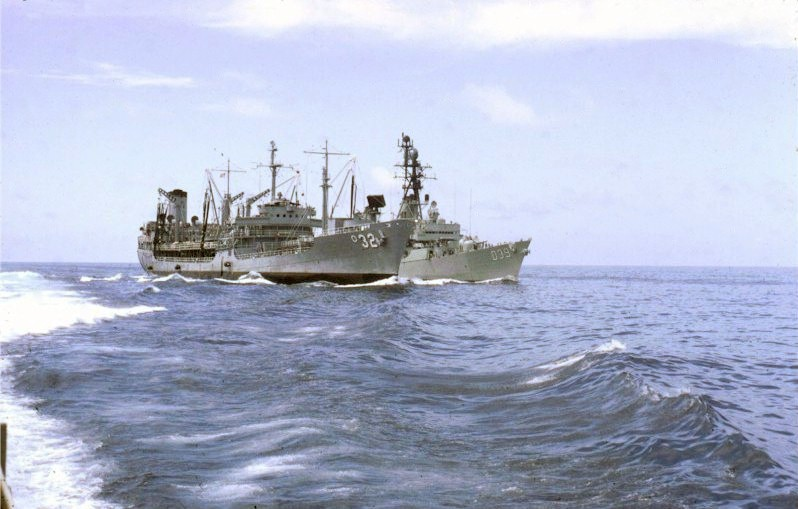
HMAS Hobart refuels from a US Navy tanker during Operation Sea Dragon off Vietnam in 1967.

The RAN did not deploy operationally until 1965, but in 1962 HMAS Vampire and HMAS Quickmatch made goodwill visits to Saigon. They were followed a year later by similar visits by HMAS Quiberon and HMAS Queenborough. In 1967, HMAS Hobart became the first RAN destroyer to be operationally deployed to Vietnam. Hobart served three tours in Vietnam from March to September in 1967, 1968, and 1970. During her operations, she fired 10,000 rounds at 1,000 shore targets and came under fire around 10 times, including on one occasion by a United States F-4 Phantom. Hobart was awarded the United States Navy Unit Commendation in recognition of her service in Vietnam, while sister ship Perth received both the United States Navy Unit Commendation and the Meritorious Unit Commendation. Clearance Diving Team 3 was awarded the US Presidential Citation, two US Navy Unit Commendations and a US Meritorius Unit Commendation. The only non US Unit to ever receive all 3 awards. After their five years of service in Vietnam, the four gunline destroyers; Perth, Brisbane, Hobart and Vendetta steamed over 397,000 miles and fired 102,546 rounds.

The aircraft carrier HMAS Sydney was converted for troopship duties in the early 1960s, and began her first voyage to Vietnam in May 1965, transporting the 1st Battalion, Royal Australian Regiment, from Sydney to Vung Tau in southern Vietnam. Sydney became known as the Vung Tau Ferry and made 25 voyages to Vietnam: carrying 16,094 troops, 5,753 deadweight tons (5,845 t) of cargo and 2,375 vehicles.

In 1969, the aircraft carrier HMAS Melbourne rammed and sank another destroyer. During the night of 2–3 June, USS Frank E. Evans was escorting the carrier during multinational wargames in the South China Sea. Ordered to the plane guard station, Evans crosses the carrier's bows and was cut in two, killing 74 United States personnel. A Joint RAN-USN Board of Inquiry was established, which found Melbourne's Captain John Stevenson and three officers from Evans at fault. Despite being cleared by a RAN court-martial, Stevenson resigned after receiving similar treatment to Robertson in the first collision. HMAS Melbourne is believed to be the only warship to sink two friendly vessels in peacetime.

In April 1971, Prime Minister John Gorton announced that Australian forces in Vietnam would be reduced. This led to the withdrawal of the clearance divers in May and the Fleet Air Arm in June. The final RAN destroyer on the gunline, Brisbane, returned to Sydney on 15 October 1971. The Whitlam government withdrew all Australian forces from and stopped military aid to South Vietnam. HMAS Jeparit returned to Sydney on 11 March 1972 and was followed the next day by HMAS Sydney. During the 10 years that the RAN was involved in the war, eight officers and sailors were killed, and another 46 were either wounded or suffered other injuries.

=== Cyclone Tracy ===
During the morning of 25 December 1974, Tropical Cyclone Tracy struck the city of Darwin, killing 71 people and causing $4 billion of damage (1998 A$). In response to the cyclone, the RAN embarked upon Operation Navy Help Darwin; the largest peacetime disaster relief operation in its history, involving 13 ships, 11 aircraft and some 3,000 personnel.

When Tracy struck Darwin, the RAN had a total of 351 personnel based in the city, along with four Attack-class patrol boat; the small number of men limited the capability of the RAN to render immediate assistance to the citizens of Darwin. All four patrol boats were damaged in some way: Advance and Assail were able to weather the cyclone with minor damage, but Attack was forced aground, and Arrow sank after colliding with Stokes Hill Wharf, killing two personnel. Land-based naval installations were also heavily damaged by the cyclone, Darwin Naval Headquarters was destroyed, as were large sections of the patrol boat base and the married quarters. The oil fuel supply installation and naval communications station at HMAS Coonawarra were also damaged. The initial RAN relief which was limited to search and rescue in the area of Darwin Harbour and Melville Island, which was hindered by the lack of reliable communications.

As the severity of the disaster was realised, a naval task force was established to render aid to the people of Darwin; Operation Navy Help Darwin. A general recall was issued to all personnel; volunteers from shore bases and ships unable to sail were used to replace those who could not return to their ships in time. The first RAN assets arrived in Darwin on 26 December, a HS 748 aircraft carrying blood transfusion equipment and Red Cross workers, followed shortly by another HS 748 carrying Clearance Diving Team 1 (CDT1). Ships also began departing for Darwin on 26 December: Balikpapan and Betano departed from Brisbane, Flinders sailed from Cairns, while Melbourne (with Rear Admiral Wells aboard), Brisbane, and Stuart left Sydney. The next day, Hobart, Stalwart, Supply, and Vendetta left Sydney, while Brunei and Tarakan sailed from Brisbane. The last ship, Wewak, left Brisbane on 2 January.

The first vessels, HMA Ships Brisbane and Flinders, arrived in Darwin on 31 December. Flinders surveyed the approaches to Darwin, ensuring the safety of the taskforce, while Brisbane landed working parties and established communications. The entire 13-ship task force had arrived in Darwin by 13 January 1975, bringing over 3,000 personnel. RAN personnel was primarily assigned to clear the suburbs of Nightcliff, Rapid Creek, Northern Territory, and Casuarina, while aircraft and helicopters were used to move evacuees and supplies, and CDT1 inspected ships in the harbour for damage and cleared several wharves. Vessels of the task force began to depart Darwin as early as 7 January, with HMA Ships Brisbane and Stalwart the last to depart on 31 January, after command of the relief operation was turned over to the commandant of the Army's 7th Military District.

=== Pacific patrol boat program ===
Following the introduction of the 1982 United Nations Convention on the Law of the Sea (UNCLOS) the exclusive economic zone (EEZ) of many coastal nations was increased from 12 to 200 Nmi. The sudden expansion of responsibility dramatically increased the area of ocean requiring surveillance, monitoring and policing by these nations, increasing the strain on existing maritime patrol resources, and highlighting the need for countries without a maritime patrol force to obtain one, especially in the South West Pacific area.

In 1979, the Australian and New Zealand Governments, at the request of Pacific Island nations, sent defence representatives into the South-West Pacific region to assess surveillance and maritime patrol requirements. The governments of a number of the Pacific nations expressed their concern about the need for a suitable naval patrol force to meet their new surveillance requirements. The Australian government responded by creating the Defence Cooperation Project (DCP), to provide suitable patrol vessels, training and infrastructure to island nations in the region. The Pacific Patrol Boat Systems Program Office was created within the Minor War Vessels Branch of the RAN procurement organisation.

The tender for the vessels was released in August 1984, and was awarded to Australian Shipbuilding Industries Pty Ltd (now Tenix Western Australia) in September 1985. The first of ten vessels was to be delivered in early 1987. The first vessel, HMPNGS Tarangau, was officially handed over to the Papua New Guinea Defence Force on 16 May 1987. Over the course of the project the number of participating countries increased. By the end of the construction phase of the project, a total of 22 boats had been delivered to 12 countries, compared to the original order of 10 boats for 8 countries. In total, the project cost for 22 vessels and associated support was A$155.25 million.

The RAN never operated the Pacific-class patrol boat (PPB), although the project has given the RAN a number of advantages in the Pacific region. The introduction of self-reliant patrol forces throughout the region has eased the strain on Australia's own maritime patrol force. Cooperation between Australia and its Pacific neighbours has allowed for a greater allocation of RAN patrol boats to protecting Australia's maritime resources, patrolling the Sea Lines of Communication (SLOC), and conducting border protection operations. The PPB's have recently undergone a mid life refit which could potentially see them operating in the region until at least 2027.

=== Two-Ocean Policy ===
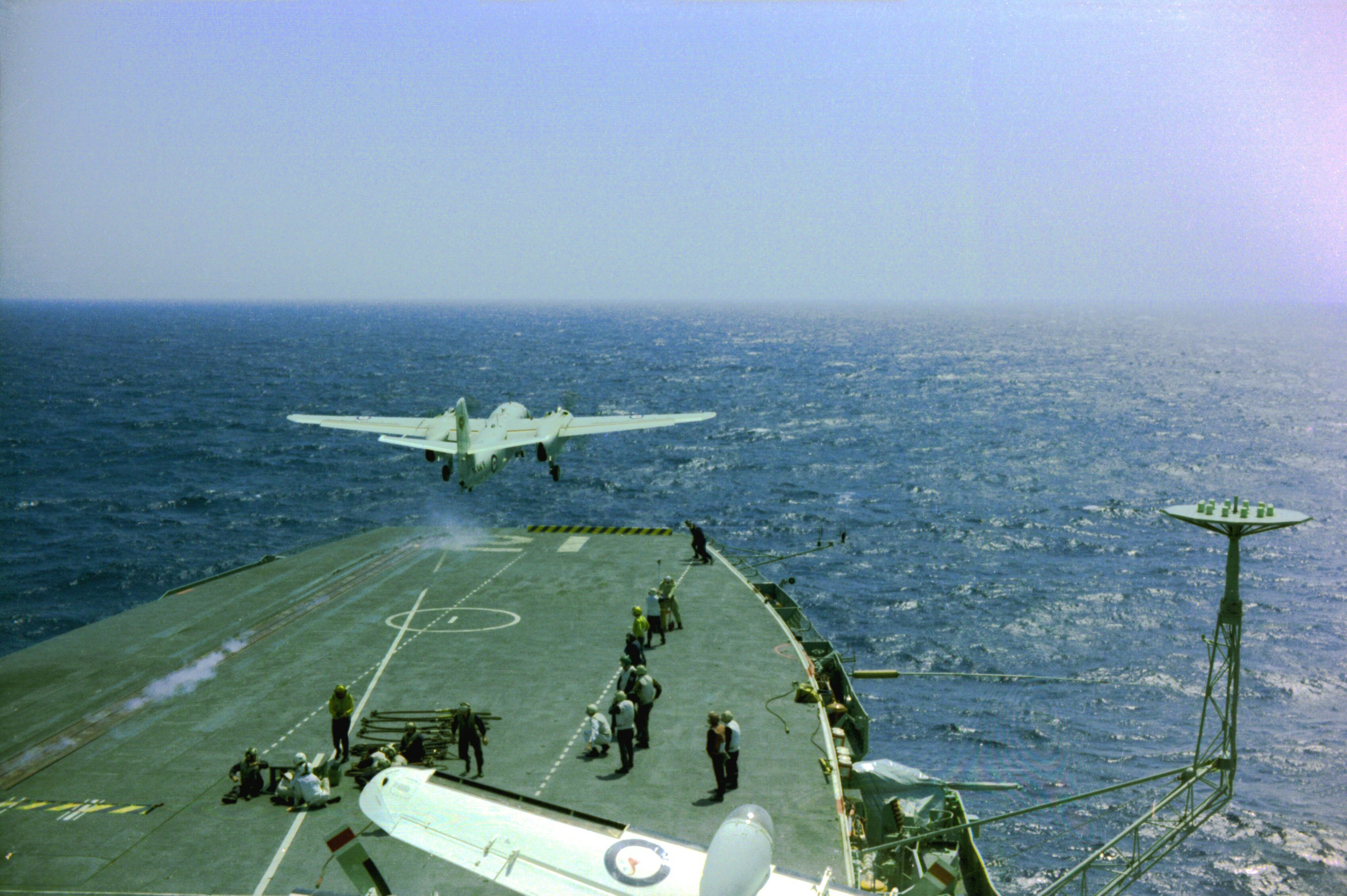
HMAS Melbourne launches a Grumman S2G Tracker, 1980

The main role of the Royal Australian Navy in the two decades following the end of Australia's involvement in the Vietnam War was supporting Australian diplomatic initiatives. In line with this goal the RAN exercised with the navies of Australia's allies and provided support to civil authorities in Australia and the South Pacific. The RAN's main military concern from the 1970s was the activities of the Soviet Navy in the Indian Ocean. In 1971 the Marxist government of South Yemen permitted the Soviet Navy to use the former British naval base at Aden, thus allowing the Soviet Navy to maintain a squadron in the Indian Ocean. These concerns lead to increased co-operation with the United States Navy and the development of the RAN's main base in Western Australia, HMAS Stirling.

During the late 1970s, the RAN replaced many of its ageing ships with modern equivalents. While it planned to purchase the British aircraft carrier HMS Invincible to replace Melbourne, Britain's offer of the carrier was withdrawn after the Falklands War. As a result, Melbourne was decommissioned without replacement in 1982 and the Fleet Air Arm retired almost all of its fixed wing aircraft on 30 June 1983.

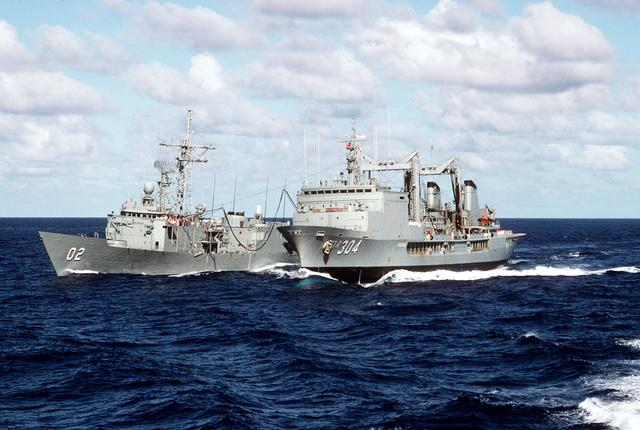
HMAS Success refuelling HMAS Canberra in 1988

In 1987, the Hawke Government's Defence White Paper called for the RAN to become a more self-reliant two-ocean navy with major fleet bases in New South Wales and Western Australia. The plan called for the expansion of Stirling on Garden Island and Jervis Bay to accommodate an expanded RAN combat surface and submarine fleets. The plan originally called for the major combat units and submarines to be split between the two fleet bases, providing similar capabilities on both sides of the continent. The proposed Jervis Bay naval base never became a reality; Fleet Base East was built up around HMAS Kuttabul in Sydney while HMAS Stirling is home to half the surface fleet and the entire submarine fleet.

The rationale behind the policy included the possibility of savings in fuel and maintenance that would result from Indian Ocean deployments beginning their journey from Western Australia rather than New South Wales. The report also classed the Indian Ocean as an area where contingencies might arise. The new facilities would increase Australia's worth to the United States, particularly to do with maintenance of submarines. Expansion at Jervis Bay would allow intensified east coast visits by the United States Pacific Fleet, and its nuclear warship visits would not run into as much opposition as they do in Sydney and Melbourne.

The 1987 White Paper was seen by many as an attempt to strengthen Australia's relationship with the United States, which had been damaged by New Zealand's stance against nuclear weapons in its ports. In line with this policy, the RAN was structured to become more self-reliant and its activities during the late 1980s were focused on operating within Australia's local region.

The Two Ocean Policy remains in place today and is supported by the current Australian Government and the opposition. The success of the policy is especially evident at HMAS Stirling. The base is thriving and its location both in a global and local context gives it an advantage over Fleet Base East. It has been suggested that all eight Anzac class ships be relocated to Stirling, this would create an easier training environment for sailors and would lead to significant cost savings.

== Post Cold-War ==
=== The Gulf Wars ===
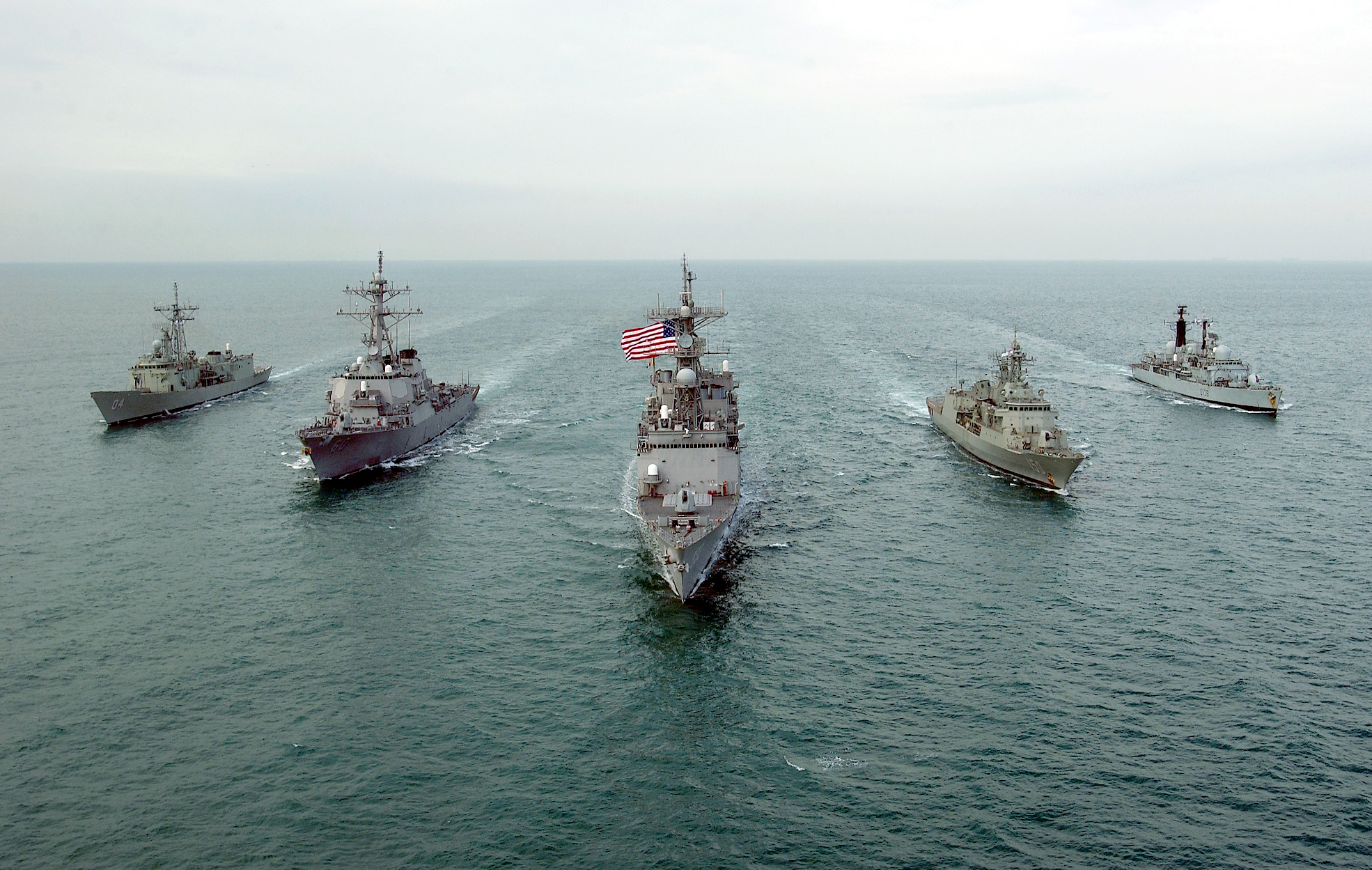
HMAS Anzac and HMAS Darwin with United States and British warships in late 2002

Australia's contribution to the 1991 Gulf War centred on a Naval Task Group, initially Task Group 627.4, which formed part of the multi-national fleet in the Persian Gulf and Gulf of Oman. In addition, medical teams were deployed aboard a US hospital ship and a naval clearance diving team took part in de-mining Kuwait's port facilities at the end of the war. Over the period from 6 September 1990 to 4 September 1991 the RAN deployed a total of six ships to the area: HMA Ships Adelaide, Brisbane, Darwin, Success, Sydney, and Westralia. Clearance Diving Team 3 operated in the theatre from 27 January 1991 to 10 May 1991. It was involved in mine clearing operations in Kuwait from 5 March to 19 April 1991.

After the end of the first Gulf War the Royal Australian Navy periodically deployed a ship to the Gulf or Red Sea to assist in maintaining sanctions against Iraq. Until the outbreak of the Second Gulf War the Australian naval force in the Persian Gulf continued to enforce the sanctions against Iraq. These operations were conducted by boarding parties from the RAN warships.

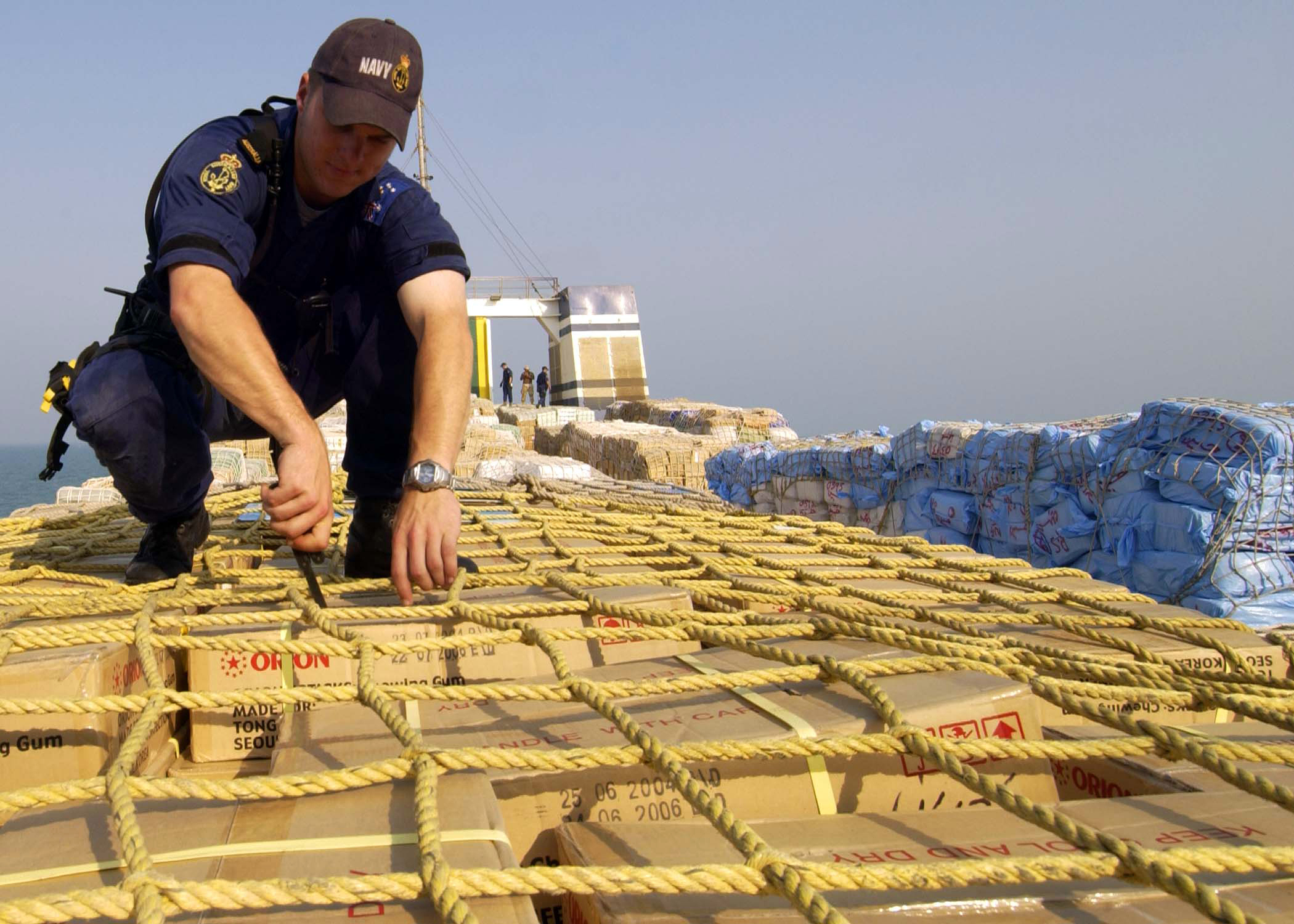
A sailor from HMAS Adelaide inspecting a ship in the Persian Gulf during 2004

Upon the outbreak of war, the RAN's focus shifted to supporting the coalition land forces and clearing the approaches to Iraqi ports. HMAS Anzac provided gunfire support to Royal Marines during fighting on the Al-Faw Peninsula and the Clearance Diving Team took part in clearing the approaches to Umm Qasr. Boarding operations continued during the war, and on 20 March, boarding parties from HMAS Kanimbla seized an Iraqi ship carrying 86 naval mines.

Since the end of the war the RAN has continuously maintained a frigate in the Persian Gulf to protect Iraq's oil infrastructure and participate in counter-smuggling operations. Twelve Australian sailors were deployed to Umm Qasr, Iraq between January and October 2004 to join the multi-national training team working with the Iraqi Coastal Defense Force. The RAN has also assumed command of coalition forces in the Persian Gulf on two occasions; Combined Task Force 58 in 2005 and Combined Task Force 158 in 2006.

=== HMAS Westralia fire ===
On 5 May 1998, a fire broke out onboard HMAS Westralia while off the Western Australia coast. The fire was caused by the rupture of a flexible fuel line (one of a number used to replace rigid hoses) on cylinder number nine, starboard engine. This sprayed diesel fuel onto a hot indicator cock, which ignited a spray fire, resulting in the deaths of four crew. Following the fire, the Australian Government and the RAN began a major investigation known as the Westralia Board of Inquiry. The enquiry found that the RAN and the contractor Australian Defence Industries (ADI) did not critically examine their course of action and that key personnel in both the RAN and the contractor were insufficiently trained and qualified. The inquiry also found that the hoses were not properly designed and were unfit for the intended purpose. In 2005, ADI was fined $75,000 for failing to provide a safe workplace. Seven sailors who were severely traumatised by the fire have also sued ADI and subcontractor Jetrock. In August 2006, the Australian Government decided to accept liability after it reached settlement with the ADI and Jetrock. The seven sailors stand to receive compensation totalling up to $10 million.

=== East Timor ===
During the Australian-led United Nations peacekeeping mission to East Timor in 1999 known as INTERFET, the RAN deployed a total of 16 ships to the mission: HMA Ships Adelaide, Anzac, Balikpapan, Brunei, Darwin, Farncomb, Jervis Bay, Labuan, Success, Sydney, Tarakan, Tobruk, Waller, Westralia, Newcastle and Melbourne. The RAN played a vital role in transporting troops and providing protection to transports and were vital to the success of INTERFET.

The RAN returned to East Timor in 2006 under Operation Astute the United Nations-authorised, Australian-led military deployment to East Timor to quell unrest and return stability during the 2006 East Timor crisis. The Royal Australian Navy deployed the Amphibious Ready Group, including the ships; Kanimbla, Manoora, Tobruk (until approximately 8 June), Balikpapan, Tarakan and Success (until 28 May). The RAN also deployed the Adelaide-class frigate HMAS Adelaide (until 28 May). The Fleet Air Arm contributed one S-70B-2 Seahawk helicopter from 816 Squadron RAN (until 28 May) and two Sea King helicopters from 817 Squadron RAN. The Royal Australian Navy force committed to Operation Astute is apparently the largest amphibious task force in the navy's history.

=== Solomon Islands ===
On 24 July 2003, HMAS Manoora arrived off Honiara, marking the beginning of Operation Anode, Australia's contribution to the Regional Assistance Mission to the Solomon Islands (RAMSI). The deployment of a 2,200 strong multinational force followed several years of unrest in the Solomon Islands. Manoora was soon joined by HMA Ships Hawkesbury, Labuan, Wewak and Whyalla. Following the initial deployment, two vessels were generally kept on station in the area. By the time the RAN deployment ended, 19 Australian warships had taken part. The last ship to leave was Fremantle, which sailed home in October 2004.

Operation Anode was not the first time units of the RAN had been deployed to the Solomon Islands; Anode was unique in that the navy's primary role was to support and facilitate the work of the Participating Police Force (PPF). Moreover, along with being the first time the RAN had supported a police-led mission,

=== Fiji ===
On 2 November 2006, in response to the Fijian military threats to overthrow the Fijian Government, the Australian government began Operation Quickstep by deploying military resources to support Australian citizens in Fiji in the event of a coup d'état. The contribution from the RAN was the deployment of three vessels (Kanimbla, Newcastle, and Success) to international waters south of Fiji; with the mission to evacuate the estimated 7,000 Australian citizens present in Fiji if the need arose. Along with the three vessels a detachment of the Special Air Service Regiment (SASR), helicopters from the 171st Aviation Squadron, and an evacuation team were also deployed.

On 29 November 2006, an Australian Army S-70A Black Hawk helicopter operating from Kanimbla, and carrying ten Army personnel on board, crashed whilst attempting to land on the ship's deck, killing 1 person, injuring 7 more and leaving one missing (later confirmed dead). Melville arrived on task the morning of 15 December 2006, equipped with a Towed Pinger Locating Drone supplied from the United States Navy set about locating the downed Black Hawk. Melville detected the locator beacon during its first pass over the crash site and pinpointed its exact location in subsequent passes. The helicopter was sitting in around 2900 metres of water.

The coup took place on 5 December, but was bloodless and almost completely without violence. The evacuation of Australians was deemed unnecessary, and vessels of the task force began arriving back in Australia on 17 December, with Kanimbla docking in Townsville, and both Newcastle and Success returning to Sydney. Melville returned to Australia in late December. The RAN decided to attempt to recover the downed Black Hawk and identified the United States Navy Supervisor of Salvage (SUPSALV) as the preferred organisation. MV Seahorse Standard recovered the remains of Trooper Joshua Porter on 5 March and the Blackhawk helicopter on 9 March, with the assistance of specialist equipment provided by the SUPSALV team. The soldier's body was repatriated on 13 March, escorted by members of the SASR. Seahorse Standard arrived in Australia with the aircraft wreckage at the end of March. The wreckage would become evidence in the Board of Inquiry into the crash.

== Battle honours ==
Prior to 1989, the battle honour system of the Royal Australian Navy (RAN) was linked to that of the Royal Navy. The British Ministry of Defence and the Admiralty were responsible for approving and assigning battle honours, although from 1947, this was done on advice from the RAN Badges, Names and Honours Committee. The only uniquely Australian battle honour during this time was "Vietnam 1965–72" (and smaller date units thereof) for deployments to the Vietnam War. Ships of the RAN inherited honours from British ships of the same name, in addition to Australian predecessors.

In 1989, the RAN Chief of Naval Staff, Admiral Michael Hudson approved a decision to have Australian warships only carry battle honours earned by previous Australian vessels. The creation and awarding of battle honours came completely under RAN control.

A complete overhaul of the RAN battle honours system was unveiled on 1 March 2010, to celebrate the navy's 109th anniversary of creation. New honours were created for operations during the 1990s and 2000s—the last approved honour prior to this was "Kuwait 1991", for Gulf War service—and the service history of previous vessels was updated to include 'due recognition' of previous actions.

== Women in the RAN ==
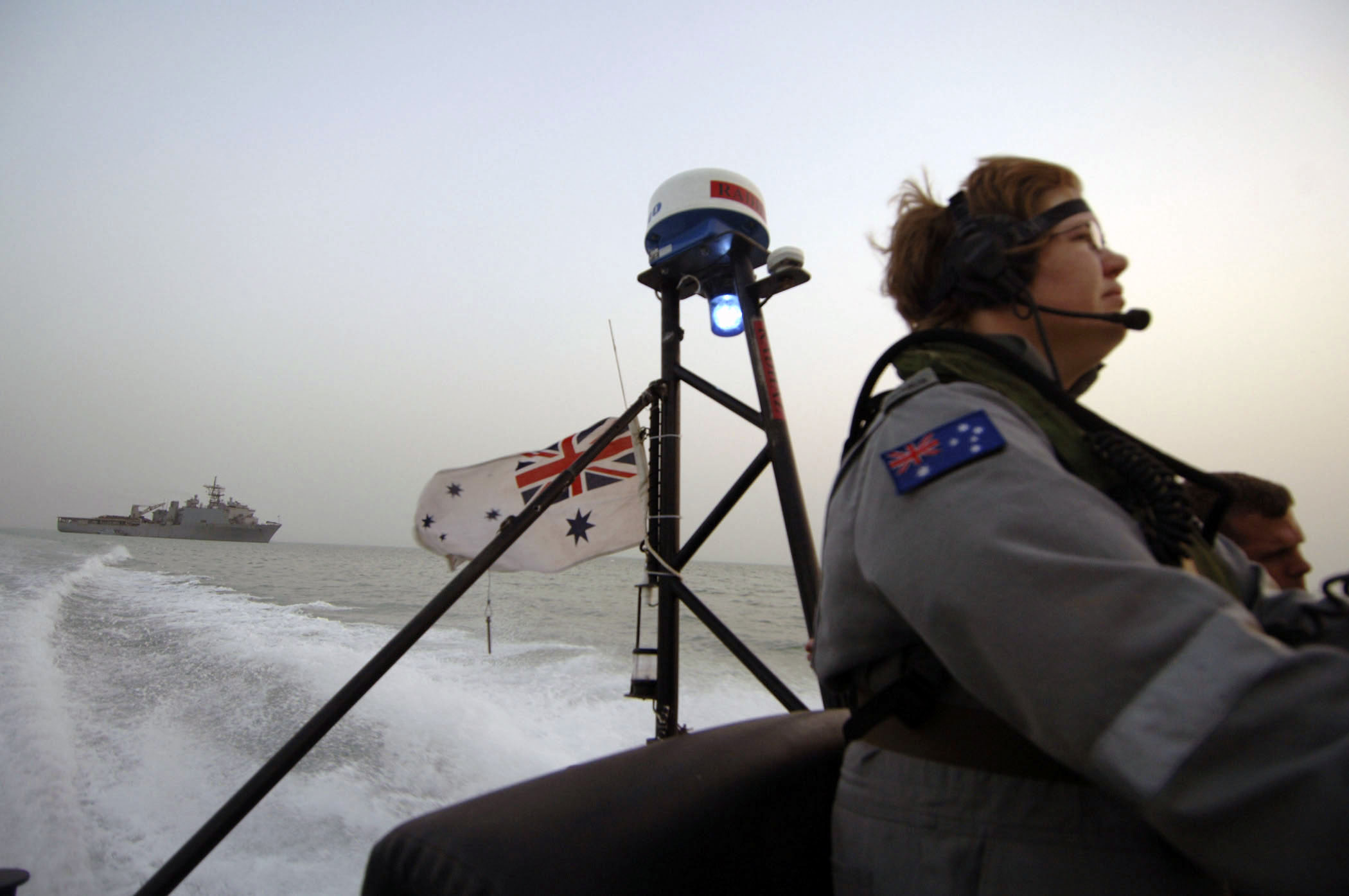
Women are expected to play a greater role in the RAN in the future

From 1911 to 1941 women were forbidden from serving in the RAN; the demands World War II placed on personnel and resources led to a change of policy. On 21 April 1941, the Australian Naval Board sent a letter authorising the entry of women into the RAN to the Commodore-in-Charge, Sydney. The letter led to the formation of the Women's Royal Australian Naval Service (WRANS) and the Royal Australian Naval Nursing Service (RANNS). The two separate women's services existed until 1984, when they were incorporated into the permanent force. Today, female members of the RAN have a wide variety of roles open to them; women serve on submarines, command ships and shore postings and are expected to play an increasingly important role in the future of the RAN.

== The current navy ==
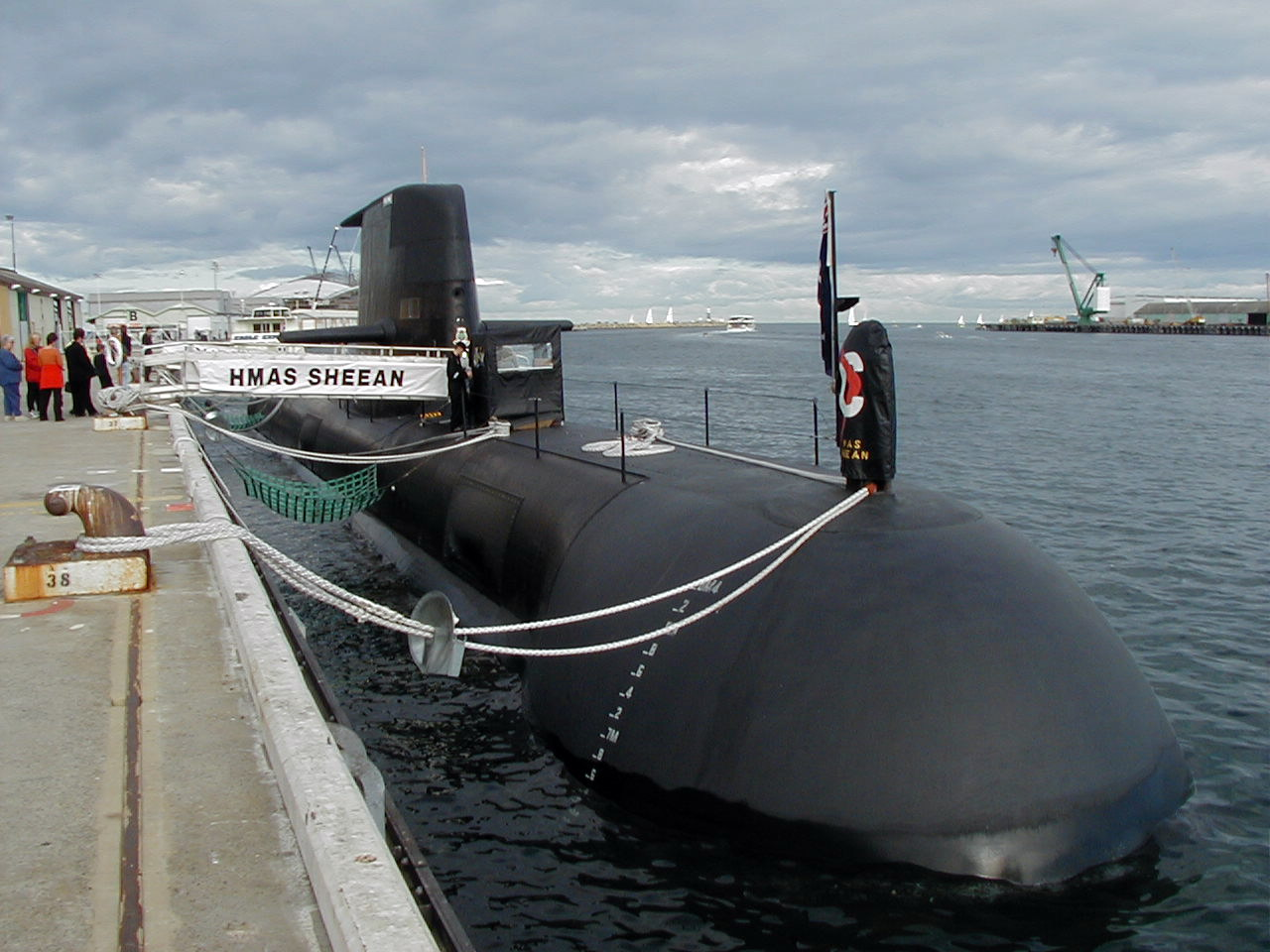
HMAS Sheean at Fremantle Harbour

The Royal Australian Navy today is a medium-sized modern navy in world terms but is one of the strongest navies in the Asia Pacific Region. The combat fleet of the RAN is made up of three Hobart-class destroyer, eight Anzac-class frigate, twelve patrol boats of the Armidale class, and six Collins-class submarine. The RAN also comprises an amphibious and supply force to transport the Australian Army and to resupply the combat arm of the navy. The RAN is divided into seven Force Element Groups (FEGs): Surface Combatants, Amphibious Warfare Forces and Afloat Support Force, Naval Aviation, Submarine Force, Mine Warfare and Clearance Diving, Patrol Boat Force and the Hydrographic Force. The FEG's were formed to manage the operations of the separate sections of the RAN in a more efficient way.

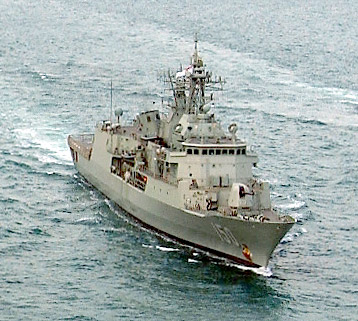
HMAS Anzac operating in support of Operation Enduring Freedom

The modern RAN began to form during the late 1970s when the Fraser Government announced the purchase of four Oliver Hazard Perry-class frigates, all to be built in America; in 1980 they announced an additional two vessels both to be built in Australia. The fifteen Australian-built vessels of the Fremantle class made up Australia's patrol boat from 1979 to 2007; they have now been replaced by the fourteen Armidale-class patrol boats.

The Collins class is the newest class of Australian submarines, built in Australia for the Royal Australian Navy. They were constructed by the Australian Submarine Corporation in Adelaide, South Australia, and replaced the six Oberon-class submarines in the Australian fleet. The first vessel, HMAS Collins, was laid down in 1990 and commissioned in 1996, with all six vessels of the class in service and based at HMAS Stirling in Western Australia.

The Anzac class is the current main fleet unit of the Royal Australian Navy; the class has eight vessels. The lead vessel of the class, HMAS Anzac, was commissioned in 1996 and the final vessel, HMAS Perth, was commissioned on 26 August 2006. Along with the eight Australian vessels, two Anzacs were also constructed for the Royal New Zealand Navy. The Anzac class were jointly constructed in New Zealand and Australia with the final fitout in Williamstown, Victoria.

The amphibious and supply arm of the RAN as at January 2021 is made up of; HMAS Choules, a Bay-class landing ship, HMAS Adelaide and HMAS Canberra, both of which are Canberra-class class landing helicopter docks, twelve LHD Landing Craft (LLC) of the LCM-1E type, two Leeuwin-class survey vessels, four Paluma-class motor launches, the fleet oiler HMAS Sirius, and the Dual Stores Replenishment Vessel HMAS Success. The RAN also has six Huon-class minehunters.

The Royal Australian Navy maintains several bases around Australia. Under the RAN's Two-Ocean Policy, HMAS Stirling (Fleet Base West) and HMAS Kuttabul (Fleet Base East) are the primary bases for all major fleet unit of the RAN. The majority of the patrol boat and amphibious forces are located at HMAS Cairns and HMAS Coonawarra, while all Fleet Air Arm squadrons are based at HMAS Albatross.

== See also ==
- Fleet Air Arm Museum (Australia)
- Royal Australian Navy Heritage Centre
- Military history of Australia
- List of Royal Australian Navy losses
