= USS Hawaii (SSN-776) =

US Navy Virginia-class submarine

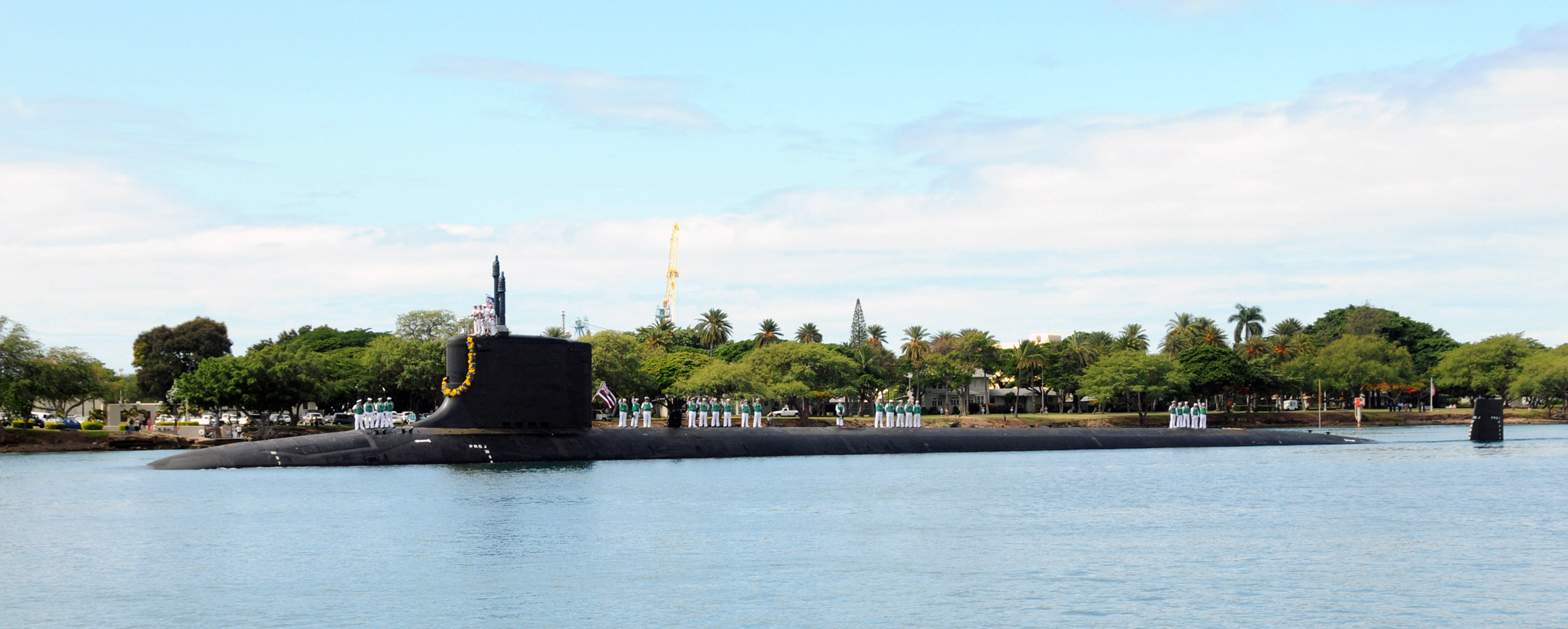
- USS Hawaii entering Pearl Harbor during a homeport change.

History

United States
- Name: USS Hawaii
- Namesake: US state of Hawaii
- Ordered: 30 September 1998
- Builder: General Dynamics Electric Boat
- Laid down: 27 August 2004
- Launched: 17 June 2006
- Commissioned: 5 May 2007
- Home port: Pearl Harbor, Hawaii
- Motto: Kūpale 'Āina; ("Defending the Land")
- Status: in active service
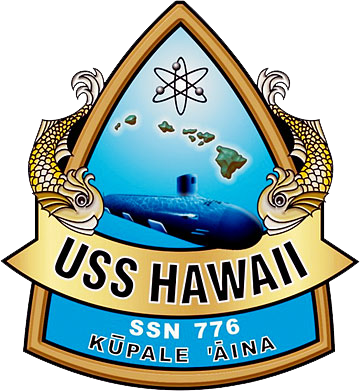
- Badge

General characteristics
- Class & type: Virginia-class submarine
- Type: Fast attack
- Displacement: 7800 tons light, 7800 tons full
- Length: 114.9 meters (377 feet)
- Beam: 10.3 meters (34 feet)
- Propulsion: 1 × S9G PWR nuclear reactor 280,000 shp (210 MW), HEU 93%; 2 × steam turbines 40,000 shp (30 MW); 1 × single shaft pump-jet propulsor; 1 × secondary propulsion motor
- Speed: 25 knots (46 km/h)
- Range: Essentially unlimited distance; 33 years
- Test depth: greater than 800 feet (240 meters)
- Complement: 134 (14 officers, 120 enlisted)
- Armament: 12 VLS tubes, four 21 inch (530 mm) torpedo tubes for Mk-48 torpedoes

USS Hawaii (hull number SSN-776), a Virginia-class submarine, is the first commissioned warship of the United States Navy to be named for the 50th state. (A previous large cruiser, or battlecruiser, USS Hawaii (CB-3) was launched, but never commissioned, and was named after the Territory of Hawaii.) The building contract was awarded to the Electric Boat Division of General Dynamics Corporation in Groton, Connecticut on 30 September 1998 and her keel was laid down on 27 August 2004. She was christened on 17 June 2006 by her sponsor, Governor Linda Lingle of Hawaii. Electric Boat delivered Hawaii to the US Navy on 22 December 2006, ahead of schedule. She was commissioned on 5 May 2007. In July 2009, she changed home port from Groton, CT (Submarine Group Two, Submarine Squadron Two) to Pearl Harbor, HI (Submarine Squadron One).

== History ==
- January 2008 – maiden deployment.
- May 2008 – post-shakedown availability.
- 4 December 2008 – US Navy announces USS Hawaii will be home ported at Pearl Harbor in 2009.
- 8 May 2009 – US Navy announces the ship has earned the U.S. Coast Guard Meritorious Unit Commendation for their work in disrupting drug trafficking from 20 February to 17 April 2008.
- 10 July 2009 – The sub transits the Panama Canal en route to new homeport at Pearl Harbor.
- 23 July 2009 – The sub reaches Pearl Harbor.
- 30 March to 5 May 2010 – The sub receives a $2.5 million refit in a drydock in Pearl Harbor.
- August 2010 – The boat leaves for her first Western Pacific cruise, under temporarily assignment to Seventh Fleet, making her the first Virginia-class submarine to enter the Western Pacific.
- February 2011 – The boat returns from her first Western Pacific cruise.
- August 2024 - The ship arrives at HMAS Stirling, Perth, Australia to conduct the first combined U.S.-Australian submarine tendered maintenance period with the crew of submarine tender USS Emory S. Land.

== See also ==
- List of submarines of the United States Navy
- Submarines in the United States Navy
