= Australia in the Gulf War =

Australian Contribution to the 1991 Gulf War
- Part of Operation Desert Storm
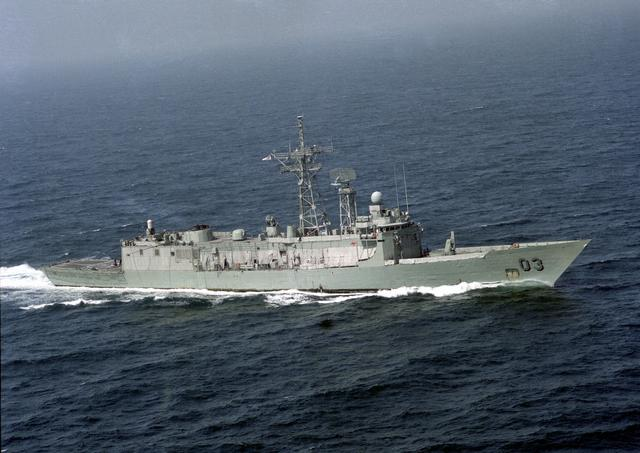
- HMAS Sydney in January 1991
- Location: Middle East, Persian Gulf, Red Sea
- Commanded by: Rear Admiral Kenneth Doolan
- Objective: Providing support to forces engaged in Operation Desert Storm and for the Sanctions against Iraq
- Date: 13 August 1990 – November 2001 (Operation Damask) (11 years, 2 Months)
- Executed by: Royal Australian Navy; Royal Australian Air Force; Australian Army
- Outcome: Coalition victory

Australia was a member of the international coalition which contributed military forces to the 1991 Gulf War, also known as Operation Desert Storm. More than 1,800 Australian Defence Force (ADF) personnel were deployed to the Persian Gulf from August 1990 to September 1991, while contingents from the Royal Australian Navy circulated through the region in support of the sanctions against Iraq until November 2001. In August 1990, two frigates HMAS Adelaide and HMAS Darwin and the replenishment ship HMAS Success left for the Persian Gulf. HMAS Success had no air defences, so the Army 16th Air Defence Regiment was embarked. On 3 December 1990, HMAS Brisbane and HMAS Sydney (IV) relieved HMAS Adelaide and HMAS Darwin. On 26 January 1991, HMAS Westralia replaced HMAS Success. A Navy clearance diving team was also deployed for explosive ordnance disposal and demolition tasks. Australian ships were in danger of sea mines and possible air attacks. In a number of recorded incidents, HMAS Brisbane encountered free floating mines, on one occasion narrowly avoiding a collision. Both HMA Ships Brisbane and Sydney encountered significant air threat warnings from Iran and Iraq throughout the initial period of the commencement of the Desert Storm Campaign. The detection of land based Silkworm anti-ship missiles from Iran throughout the campaign also added to the challenges for both crews as well as the multi-national Naval Forces.

Although Australia's contribution was primarily naval, a small contingent of Australian service personnel were seconded to British and United States ground troops. However, the government's position was not to deploy ground troops with "no boots in the sand". The Royal Australian Air Force deployed a unit of photo interpreters who were based in Saudi Arabia. Four medical teams were also deployed. At the end of Desert Storm, 75 ADF personnel were deployed to Northern Iraq to assist in the provision of humanitarian aid to the Kurds living in the UN-declared exclusion zone.

Whilst there were no casualties of ADF personnel during the conflict, a significant number of Australian Gulf War veterans appear to continue to suffer from Gulf War illness. Overall, Australian forces never officially engaged in open combat with hostile forces.

== Overview ==
Australia's contribution to the 1991 Gulf War centred on a Naval Task Group which formed part of the multi-national fleet in the Persian Gulf and Gulf of Oman, under Operation Damask. In addition, medical teams were deployed aboard a US hospital ship and a navy Clearance diving team took part in de-mining Kuwait's port facilities at the end of the war. Following the end of the war Australia deployed a medical unit on Operation Habitat to northern Iraq as part of Operation Provide Comfort. While there were proposals to deploy other units (including an apparent US request for RF-111 reconnaissance aircraft) these proposals came to nothing and no Australian Army or Royal Australian Air Force combat units were deployed.

The Australian Special Air Service Regiment (SASR) did not take part in the war. In 1993, a book was published on a British SAS patrol Bravo Two Zero with an Australian member using the pseudonym of Stan. Subsequent media reports stated that SASR soldiers on exchange took part in the war, however, in 2005 it was disclosed that Stan was a former Army Reserve Commando who had joined the British Army. As the SASR had long established exchange programmes, a soldier may have served with British or United States special forces units. The total number of personnel deployed between August 1990 and September 1991 was 1,800. In the aftermath of the conflict, Royal Australian Navy warships continued to be deployed to the Persian Gulf periodically to enforce sanctions against Iraq until the 2003 Invasion of Iraq.

== Royal Australian Navy ==
All Royal Australian Navy ships were coordinated from the Maritime Headquarters (MHQ) in the Garden Island Naval Precinct in Sydney. Australia's naval contribution to the 1991 Gulf War and the following period of sanctions manifested in ten incarnations of Operation Damask, that spanned from September 1990 until November 2001.

Operation Damask I (6 September 1990 – 3 December 1990)

Task Group 627.4

- HMAS Adelaide
  - 1 S-70B-2 Seahawk, SITU and 1 AS-350BA Squirrel, 723 Squadron
- HMAS Darwin
  - 1 S-70B-2 Seahawk, SITU and 1 AS-350BA Squirrel, 723 Squadron
- HMAS Success (6 September 1990 – 25 January 1991)
  - Detachment, 111 Battery (Light), 16th Air Defence Regiment
  - 1 AS-350BA Squirrel, 723 Squadron

The first ships to leave port were Adelaide and Darwin on 13 August. The two ships embarked their complement of Fleet Air Arm (RAN) Seahawk and Squirrel helicopters on 14 August. Task Group 627.4 was formed when the Success rendezvoused with Darwin and Adelaide on 15 August, with the commander of the task group being embarked on Success. Upon formation of the group, and during the transit towards HMAS Stirling, a rigorous training exercise was performed. The exercise focused on anti-aircraft warfare, damage control, and Nuclear, Biological, Chemical defence. On one occasion, Darwin and Adelaide boarded Success, which had assumed the role of a non-cooperative merchant ship. RAAF aircraft and Learjet aircraft operated by Fleet Support Services assisted the task group in their exercises. The exercises were paused when the task group arrived at Stirling for an overnight visit on 21 August, and were resumed once the group departed Stirling to transit the Indian Ocean the next day. After a brief stop in Diego Garcia, the task group entered the Middle East Region on 3 September. While Operation Damask officially started on 6 September, Success commenced her replenishment operations on 7 September. Over the course of Operation Damask, the task group interrogated up to 30 merchant vessels a day, as well as aircraft, questioning their origin, identity destination and cargo, as well as conducting naval boarding operations. Most notably, between 26 and 28 October Darwin combined with US Ships USS Ogden and USS Reasoner, and HMS Brazen to intercept the 150,000 tonne oil tanker Amuriyah, whose shipmaster was uncooperative. This was despite numerous warning shots and even a flypast of aircraft from the aircraft carrier USS Independence, which failed to deter the tanker. The tanker adopted a zig-zag course in an apparent attempt to ram Darwin. It was only when a US Marine detachment from Ogden fast-roped from helicopters on to the ship that she was brought to a stop enabling boarding parties from Darwin and Reasoner to conduct a search.

Following Operation Damask I, the three ships left the combat zone on 3 December after being relieved by the ships assigned to Operation Damask II.

Operation Damask II (3 December 1990 – 28 May 1991)

Task Group 627.4

- HMAS Brisbane (until 26 March 1991)
- HMAS Sydney (until 26 March 1991)
  - 1 S-70B-2 Seahawk, SITU, 1 AS-350BA Squirrel, 723 Squadron
- HMAS Westralia (26 January 1991 – June 1991)
  - Detachment, 111 Battery (Light), 16th Air Defence Regiment

On 12 November, Brisbane and Sydney departed for the Middle East via Fremantle and Diego Garcia, arriving on 3 December. Westralia arrived later on 2 January 1991. On 3 December, the three ships were permitted by Australian Prime Minister Bob Hawke to pass through the Strait of Hormuz into the Persian Gulf. They became part of a multi-national task force consisting of around 90 warships, 100 logistical support ships and 800 aircraft from 15 nations. On the morning of 3 December, Sydney and Brisbane rendezvoused with the ships part of Damask I, and conducted a thorough handover. On 16 December, Sydney and Brisbane entered the Persian Gulf along with the rest of the Naval Task Force, and began to conduct maritime interception duties. On 24 December, Sydney joined 5 other coalition ships to assist in the interception of the Iraqi-crewed Ibn Khaldoon, which was attempting to break the United Nations embargo. After failing to respond, Sydney, as well as some of the other warships, inserted a boarding team to stop the ship, which they later found to have been carrying prohibited cargo. On 27 and 28 December, Brisbane came to the assistance of three separate vessels in distress. Sydney boarded another ship on 30 December. Following the passing of the United Nations deadline on 16 December, Brisbane and Sydney became part of Battle Force Zulu, forming part of an air defence screen providing anti-aircraft cover to the four US Navy aircraft carriers in that force. These duties continued until the end of Damask II. During Westralia's time in the Persian Gulf, she conducted 90 replenishment at sea over a period of 120 days.

Operation Damask III (13 June 1991 – 4 September 1991)

- HMAS Darwin
  - 1 S-70B-2 Seahawk, 816 Squadron and 1 AS-350BA Squirrel, 723 Squadron

Darwin arrived in the Persian Gulf on 13 June and immediately commenced escort duties by leading merchant ships to and from Kuwaiti waters. During this time, emphasis was placed on detection of possible mine attacks, with Darwin's helicopters being deployed constantly forward of the vessel in search of mines as well as extra lookouts being posted around the ship. In addition to this, Darwin integrated with the USS Nimitz battle group, and conducted boarding and interception operations.

Operation Damask IV (25 September 1991 – January 1992)

- HMAS Sydney

Operation Damask V (22 February 1992 – 16 July 1992)

- HMAS Darwin

Operation Damask VI (October 1992 – April 1993)

- HMAS Canberra

Canberra was deployed to the Red Sea in October 1992 to enforce an oil embargo against Iraq in accordance with UN sanctions.

Operation Damask VII (20 July 1993 – 9 November 1993)

- HMAS Sydney

Operation Damask VIII (7 May 1996 – 15 August 1996)

- HMAS Melbourne

Operation Damask IX (29 May 1999 – 13 August 1999)

- HMAS Melbourne

Operation Damask X (30 July 2001 – November 2001)

- HMAS Anzac

Other Deployments

- Logistic Support Element (Muscat, Oman)
  - Logistic Support Detachment Bahrain
  - Logistic Support Detachment Dubai

Task Group Medical Support Elements (served aboard USS Comfort)

- TGMSE 1 (13 September 1990 – 4 January 1991)
- TGMSE 2 (31 December 1990 – 15 March 1991)
- TGMSE 3 (13 January 1991 – 15 March 1991)

Clearance Diving Team 3 operated in the theatre from 27 January 1991 to 10 May 1991. It was involved in mine clearing operations in Kuwait from 5 March to 19 April 1991.

== Royal Australian Air Force ==
RAAF C-130 aircraft from No. 36 and No. 37 Squadrons provided a shuttle service between Australia and the Persian Gulf. Boeing 707 aircraft from No. 33 Squadron and VIP aircraft from No. 34 Squadron also flew to the Middle East. A small team of RAAF photo-interpreters was posted to Saudi Arabia. Intelligence analysts from the RAAF and Defence Intelligence Organisation were also posted to Saudi Arabia.

== Australian Army ==
The only formed Australian Army units to participate in the Persian Gulf War were anti-aircraft missile teams from the 16th Air Defence Regiment, Royal Australian Artillery who, equipped with RBS 70 missiles, provided point defence to HMAS Success and HMAS Westralia. A small number of Australians (mainly Army officers) on exchange to US and British units saw action in the Persian Gulf with those units.

== Operation Provide Comfort/Operation Habitat (16 May 1991 – 30 June 1991) ==
The Australian Army and Air Force provided 75 personnel to Operation Habitat, the Australian contribution to Operation Provide Comfort, the delivery of humanitarian aid to Kurds living in the UN-declared exclusion zone in northern Iraq.

- Australian Medical Unit (Gir-I-Pit, Northern Iraq)
  - Headquarters and Administrative Support Group
  - Four Medical Teams
  - Dental Team
  - Preventative Medical Section
  - Engineer Section
