= List of recent Australian warship deployments to the Middle East =

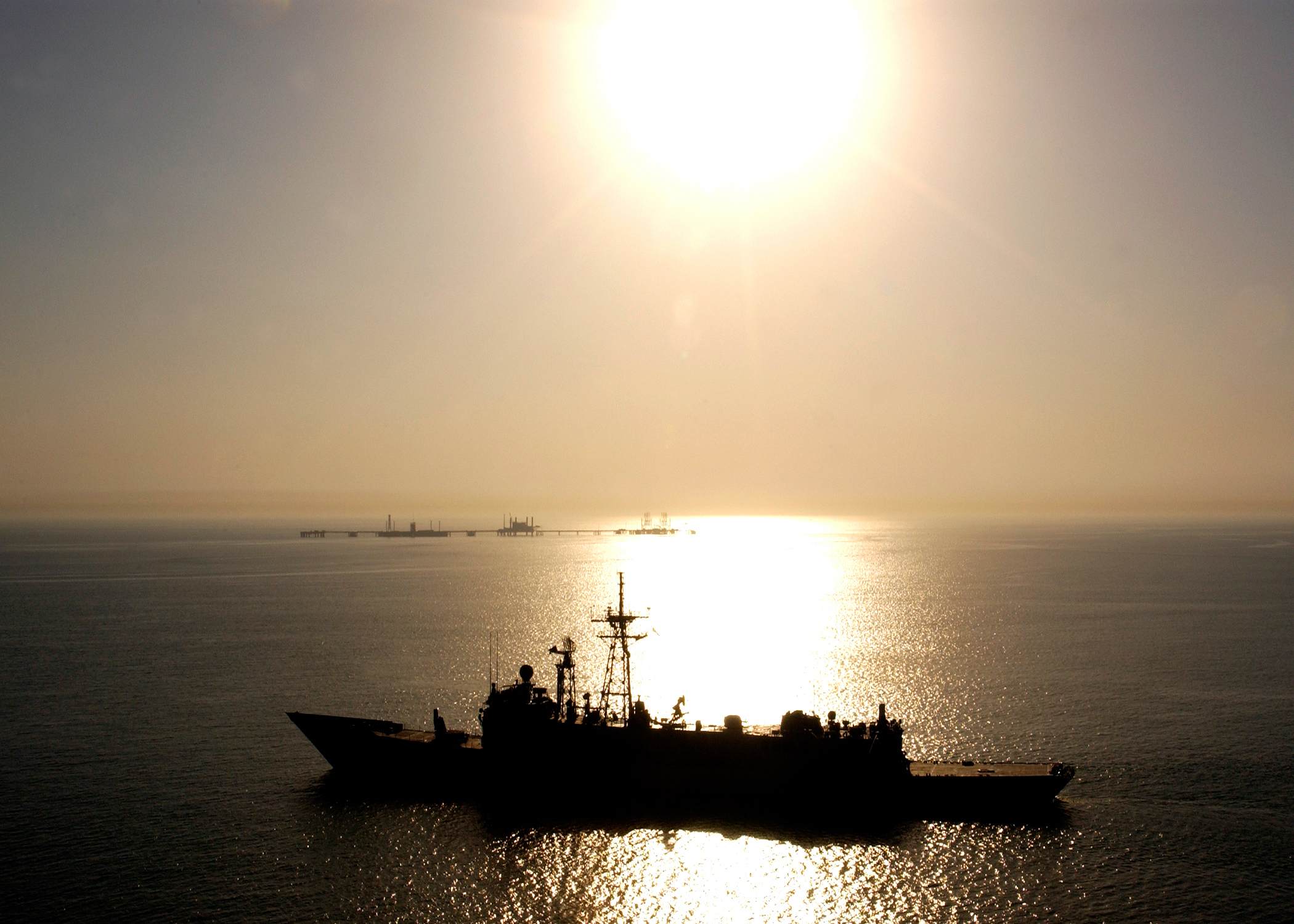
HMAS Adelaide in the Persian Gulf in September 2004.

The Royal Australian Navy has deployed ships to the Middle East over 57 times since 1990. These ships have participated in the 1991 Gulf War, enforced sanctions against Iraq, taken part in the 2003 Invasion of Iraq and provided security for Iraq's oil exports. Since 2009 Australian ships have also been involved in counter piracy operations.

The dates provided are the dates the ship arrived and departed from the Middle East Area of Operations. Please see the Database of Royal Australian Navy Operations 1990–2005 for the dates the ships arrived and departed from Australia. Except where otherwise noted, all ships mainly operated in the Persian Gulf.

== Deployments ==
Ship	Operation(s)	Arrived	Departed	Notes
Adelaide	Damask I	3 September 1990	3 December 1990	Gulf of Oman
Darwin	Damask I	3 September 1990	3 December 1990	Gulf of Oman
Success	Damask I/II	3 September 1990	25 January 1990	
Sydney	Damask II	3 December 1990	26 March 1991	
Brisbane	Damask II	3 December 1990	26 March 1991	
Westralia	Damask II/III	25 January 1991	June 1991	
Darwin	Damask III	13 June 1991	4 September 1991	
Sydney	Damask IV	25 September 1991	31 January 1992	Red Sea
Darwin	Damask V	11 March 1992	16 July 1992	Red Sea
Canberra	Damask VI	13 November 1992	12 March 1993	Red Sea
Sydney	Damask VII	30 July 1993	9 November 1993	Red Sea
Melbourne	Damask VIII	7 May 1996	15 August 1996	
Melbourne	Damask IX	30 May 1999	13 August 1999	
Anzac	Damask X/Slipper	30 July 2001	November 2001	
Sydney	Slipper	9 November 2001	23 February 2002	
Adelaide	Slipper	2 December 2001	4 March 2002	
Kanimbla	Slipper	2 December 2001	4 March 2002	
Canberra	Slipper	14 March 2002	8 July 2002	
Manoora	Slipper	28 February 2002	24 June 2002	
Newcastle	Slipper	8 February 2002	24 June 2002	
Melbourne	Slipper	24 June 2002	8 November 2002	
Arunta	Slipper	8 July 2002	20 November 2002	
Anzac	Slipper/Bastille/Falconer	8 November 2002	27 April 2003	
Darwin	Slipper/Bastille/Falconer	10 November 2002	26 April 2003	
Kanimbla	Bastille/Falconer	13 February 2003	14 June 2003	
Sydney	Falconer/Catalyst	29 April 2003	2 August 2003	
Manoora	Falconer	3 June 2003	16 June 2003	Returned equipment to Australia
Newcastle	Catalyst	5 August 2003	17 November 2003	
Melbourne	Catalyst	27 October 2003	1 April 2004	
Stuart	Catalyst	3 April 2004	13 August 2004	
Adelaide	Catalyst	13 July 2004	12 January 2005	
Darwin	Catalyst	12 January 2005	11 June 2005	
Tobruk	Catalyst	May 2005?	16 May 2005	Transported the Al Muthanna Task Group's vehicles to Kuwait
Newcastle	Catalyst	14 June 2005	November 2005	
Parramatta	Catalyst	November 2005	March 2006	
Ballarat	Catalyst	March 2006	August 2006	
Warramunga	Catalyst	July 2006	January 2007?	
Tobruk	Catalyst and Slipper	January 2007?	March 2007?	Transported military stores and equipment
Toowoomba	Catalyst	January 2007	June 2007	
Anzac	Catalyst	June 2007?	December 2007	
Arunta	Catalyst	December 2007	April 2008	
Stuart	Catalyst	April 2008	August 2008	
Parramatta	Catalyst	August 2008	23 January 2009	
Warramunga	Slipper	23 January 2009	June 2009	last ship assigned exclusively in the Persian Gulf
Toowoomba	Slipper	June 2009	November 2009	first ship to be assigned to anti-piracy, off Somalia
Stuart	Slipper	November 2009	April 2010	anti-piracy
Parramatta	Slipper	April 2010	October 2010	anti-piracy
Melbourne	Slipper	October 2010	January 2011	anti-piracy
Stuart	Slipper	January 2011	June 2011	anti-piracy
Melbourne	Slipper	February 2012	July 2012	anti-piracy
Anzac	Slipper	July 2012	January 2013	anti-piracy/anti-terrorism
Toowoomba	Slipper	January 2013	April 2013	anti-piracy
Darwin	Slipper/Manitou	February 2014	August 2014	anti-piracy – last warlike/Slipper deployment
