= HMAS Sydney (FFG 03) =

1980 Adelaide-class frigate

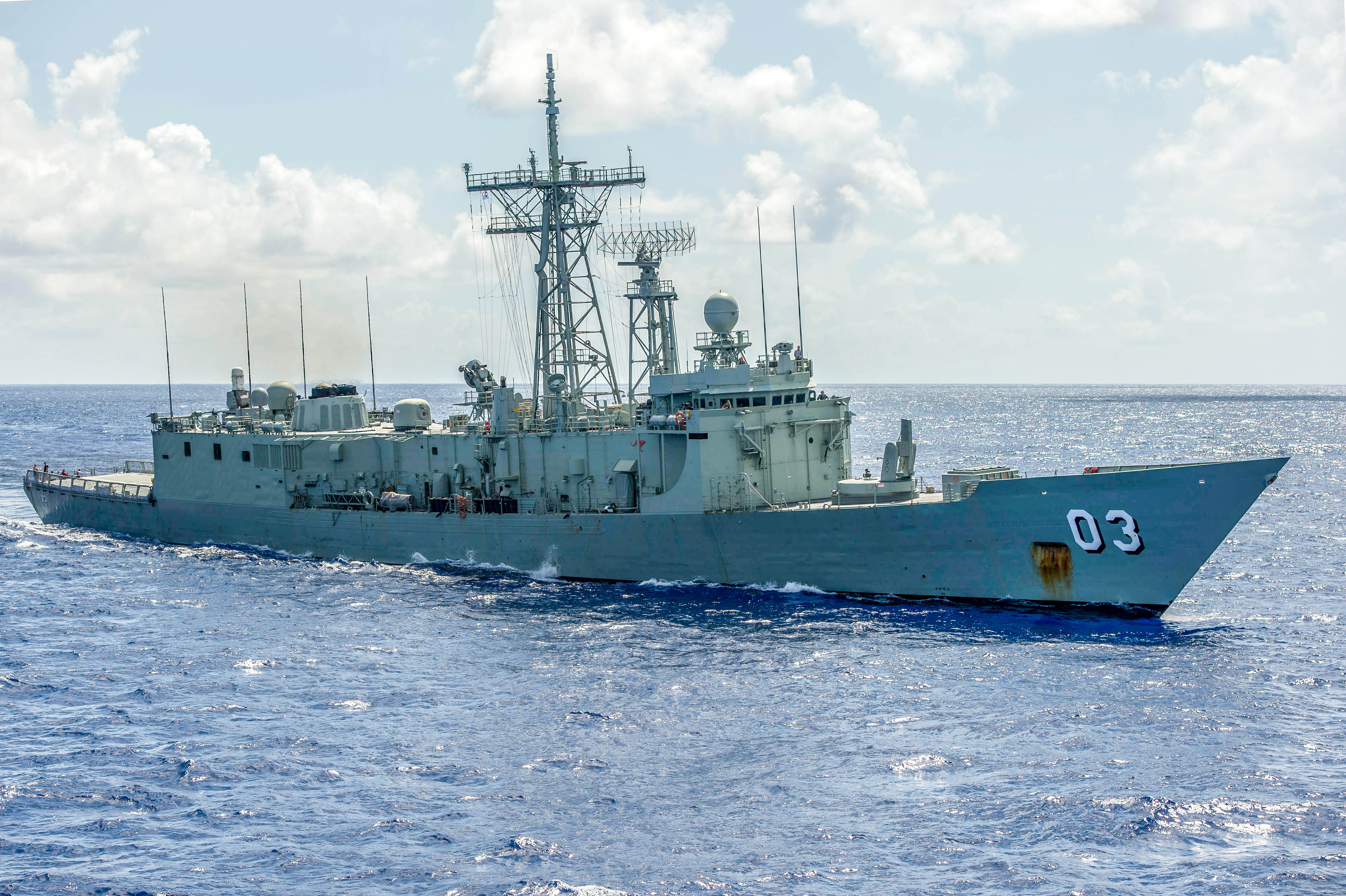
- HMAS Sydney underway in 2013

History

Australia
- Namesake: City of Sydney
- Builder: Todd Pacific Shipyards, Seattle, Washington
- Laid down: 16 January 1980
- Launched: 26 September 1980
- Commissioned: 29 January 1983
- Decommissioned: 7 November 2015
- Identification: MMSI number: 503105000; Callsign: VKML
- Motto: "Thorough and Ready"
- Nickname(s): FFG-35 (US hull designation during construction)
- Honours and awards: Battle honours: Kuwait 1991; East Timor 1999; Persian Gulf 2001–03; Iraq 2003; plus ten inherited honours; Other awards: Meritorious Unit Citation
- Fate: Scrapped 2017
- Notes: Replaced by HMAS Sydney (DDG 42)
- Badge

General characteristics
- Class & type: Adelaide-class guided missile frigate
- Displacement: 4,100 tons
- Length: 138.1 m (453 ft) overall
- Beam: 13.7 m (45 ft)
- Draught: 7.5 m (25 ft)
- Propulsion: 2 × General Electric LM2500 gas turbines, 41,000 horsepower (31,000 kW), 1 shaft; 2 × 650-horsepower (480 kW) auxiliary propulsors
- Speed: 29 knots (54 km/h; 33 mph)
- Range: 4,500 nautical miles (8,300 km; 5,200 mi) at 20 knots (37 km/h; 23 mph)
- Complement: 184 (including 15 officers, not including aircrew)
- Sensors & processing systems: AN/SPS-49 air search radar; AN/SPS-55 surface search and navigation radar; SPG-60 fire control radar (Mark 92 fire control system); AN/SQS-56 hull-mounted sonar
- Armament: 1 × Mark 13 Missile Launcher for Harpoon and Standard missiles; 1 × 8-cell Mark 41 VLS with Evolved Sea Sparrow missiles; 2 × Mark 32 torpedo tubes; 1 × OTO Melara 76 mm naval gun; 1 × 20 mm Phalanx CIWS; Up to 6 x 12.7-millimetre (0.50 in) machine guns; 2 × M2HB .50 calibre Mini Typhoons (fitted as required)
- Aircraft carried: 2 × S-70B Seahawk or 1 × Seahawk and 1 × AS350B Squirrel

HMAS Sydney (FFG 03) was an Adelaide-class guided-missile frigate of the Royal Australian Navy (RAN). The frigate was one of six modified Oliver Hazard Perry-class frigates ordered from 1977 onwards, and the third of four to be constructed in the United States of America. Laid down and launched in 1980, Sydney was named for the capital city of New South Wales, and commissioned into the RAN in 1983.

During her operational history, Sydney has been involved in Australian responses to the 1987 Fijian coups d'état and the Bougainville uprising. The frigate was deployed to the Persian Gulf on five occasions in support of United States operations during the Gulf War, War in Afghanistan, and the 2003 invasion of Iraq, and has completed two round-the-world voyages.

Sydney was originally expected to remain in service until 2013, but was retained in service until 2015; ceasing active deployments on 27 February and serving as a moored training ship until her decommissioning on 7 November. The frigate has been replaced in service by a Hobart-class destroyer.

== Design and construction ==
Following the cancellation of the Australian light destroyer project in 1973, the British Type 42 destroyer and the American Oliver Hazard Perry-class frigate were identified as alternatives to replace the cancelled light destroyers and the Daring-class destroyers. Although the Oliver Hazard Perry class was still at the design stage, the difficulty of fitting the Type 42 with the SM-1 missile, and the success of the Perth class acquisition (a derivative of the American Charles F. Adams-class destroyer) compared to equivalent British designs led the Australian government to approve the purchase of two US-built Oliver Hazard Perry-class frigates in 1976. A third (Sydney) was ordered in 1977, followed by a fourth, with all four ships integrated into the USN's shipbuilding program. A further two ships were ordered in 1980, and were constructed in Australia.

As designed, the ship had a full load displacement of 3,605 tons, a length overall of 135.6 metres (445 ft), a beam of 13.7 metres (45 ft), and a draught of 24.5 metres (80 ft). Starting in February 1989, Sydney was modified from the Oliver Hazard Perry FLIGHT II design to FLIGHT III, requiring a lengthening of the helicopter deck for the RAST helicopter recovery system, which increased displacement to 4,100 tons and pushing the overall length to 138.1 metres (453 ft). Propulsion machinery consisted of two General Electric LM2500 gas turbines, which provided a combined 41,000 horsepower (31,000 kW) to the single propeller shaft. Top speed was 29 knots (54 km/h; 33 mph), with a range of 4,500 nautical miles (8,300 km; 5,200 mi) at 20 knots (37 km/h; 23 mph). Two 650-horsepower (480 kW) electric auxiliary propulsors were used for close manoeuvring, with a top speed of 4 knots (7.4 km/h; 4.6 mph). Standard ship's company was 184, including 15 officers, but excluding the flight crew for the embarked helicopters. Sydney was the first ship of her class to carry female sailors and officers, requiring the installation of partitioning to some mess decks.

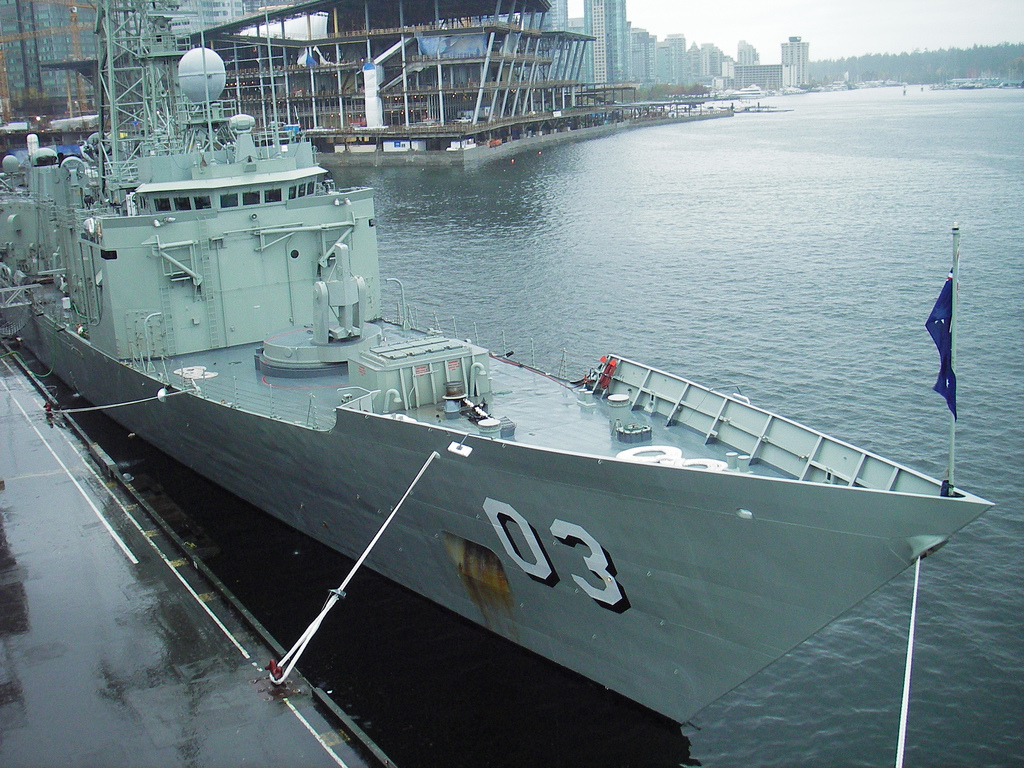
Sydney in Vancouver, Canada, in 2007. The 8-cell Mark 41 Vertical Launch System installed during the FFG Upgrade can be seen forward of the Mark 13 armature missile launcher.

Original armament for the ship consisted of a Mark 13 missile launcher configured to fire RIM-66 Standard and RGM-84 Harpoon missiles, supplemented by an OTO Melara 76-millimetre (3.0 in) gun and a Vulcan Phalanx point-defence system. As part of the mid-2000s FFG Upgrade Project, an eight-cell Mark 41 Vertical Launch System was fitted, with a payload of RIM-162 Evolved Sea Sparrow missiles. For anti-submarine warfare, two Mark 32 torpedo tube sets were fitted; originally firing the Mark 44 torpedo, the Adelaides later carried the Mark 46, then the MU90 Impact following the FFG Upgrade. Up to six 12.7-millimetre (0.50 in) machine guns could be carried for close-in defence, and since 2005, two M2HB .50 calibre machine guns in Mini Typhoon mounts were installed when needed for Persian Gulf deployments. The sensor suite included an AN/SPS-49 air search radar, AN/SPS-55 surface search and navigation radar, SPG-60 fire control radar connected to a Mark 92 fire control system, and an AN/SQS-56 hull-mounted sonar. Two helicopters could be embarked: either two S-70B Seahawk or one Seahawk and one AS350B Squirrel.

The last ship of the Oliver Hazard Perry Flight II design, Sydney was laid down at Todd Pacific Shipyards on 16 January 1980. She was launched on 26 September 1980, and commissioned into the RAN on 29 January 1983. During construction, the ship was identified by the United States Navy hull number FFG-35.

== Operational history ==
From commissioning until mid-1984, Sydney was attached to the United States Navy's Pacific Fleet as a unit of Destroyer Squadron 9. During this time, the frigate conducted working-up and training exercises.

In May 1987, Sydney visited Fiji, and was alongside in Suva when the first of the 1987 Fijian coups d'état occurred on 14 May. Sydney and sister ship Adelaide, alongside in Lautoka, were instructed to remain off Fiji to aid in any necessary evacuation of Australian citizens; the first component of what became Operation Morris Dance. Sydney remained on station until at least 29 May, when a phased withdrawal began.

Following the acquisition of the Vulcan Phalanx close-in weapon system and the Seahawk helicopter, Sydney underwent a modification refit to be capable of using these weapons. This refit occurred over 1987 and 1988, and also saw the installation of fin stabilisation systems.

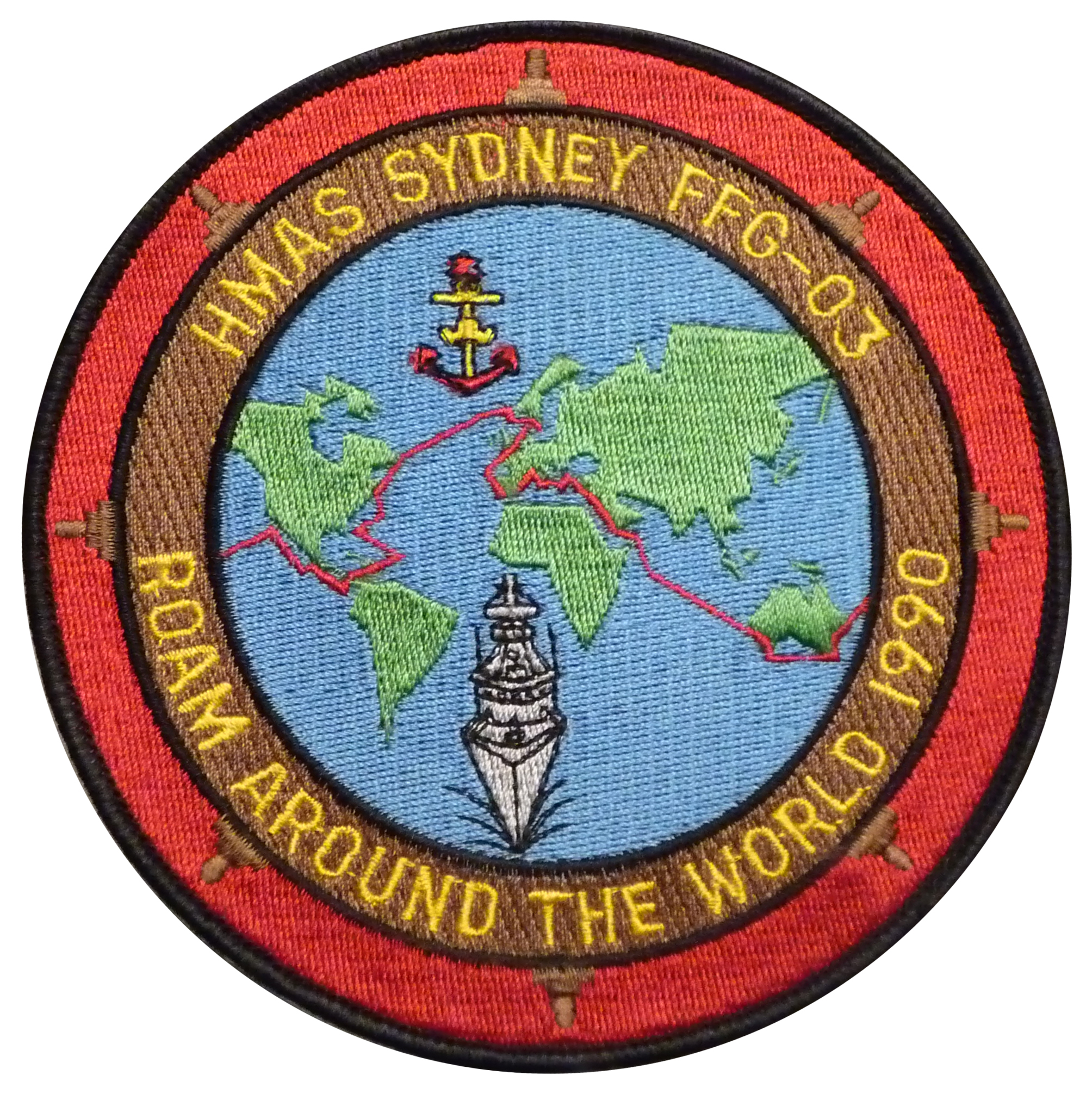
Commemorative badge of the 1990 world voyage, on display in the Australian National Maritime Museum, Sydney.

In January 1990, Sydney, Tobruk, and Jervis Bay were placed on standby to evacuate civilians from Bougainville Island following the Bougainville uprising. Sydney and Tobruk stood down in February, and the two ships departed with the submarine Oxley on a deployment to Turkey to commemorate the 75th anniversary of the landing at Anzac Cove. Following Anzac Day, Sydney continued on a round-the-world voyage, which included numerous diplomatic visits to European and American ports, the first visit of a RAN vessel to Sweden, and participation in a United States counter-narcotics operation in the Caribbean. The frigate arrived home in September.

On 3 December 1990, Sydney and the Perth-class destroyer Brisbane arrived in the Persian Gulf to relieve HMA Ships Adelaide and Darwin as part of Operation Damask; the Australian military contribution to the Gulf War. Sydney was assigned to the escort screen around Battle Force Zulu (Task Force 154), a naval force built around four United States Navy aircraft carriers, and also participated in surveillance and boarding operations. The two Australian warships remained in the area until 26 March 1991. Sydney was awarded the Meritorious Unit Citation on 4 November 1991 for this deployment, and later received the battle honour "Kuwait 1991".

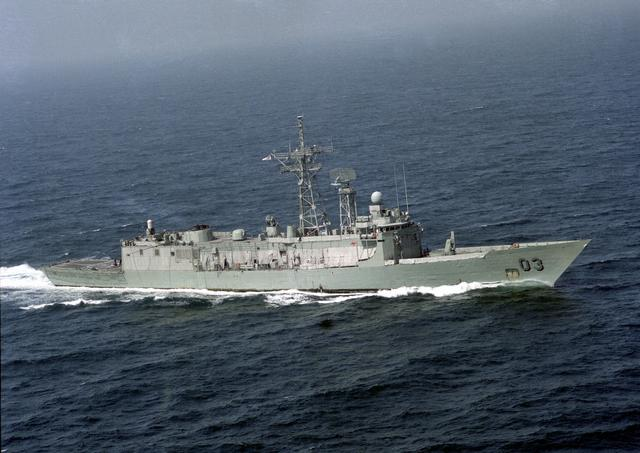
Sydney underway in the Persian Gulf during the Operation Damask deployment

Sydney was deployed back to the Persian Gulf for Operation Damask from September 1991 to February 1992, and again from June 1993 to December 1993.

On 14 March 1994, Sydney rescued the crew of a yacht which had been participating in the Trans-Tasman Yacht Race before encountering difficulties. In early October, the frigate was called on to search for survivors of a light aircraft that ditched into the Tasman Sea.

In May 1995, Sydney became the first RAN warship to visit the Russian port of Vladivostok, as support for a diplomatic and trade mission.

In 1997, Sydney was one of several RAN vessels placed on standby following the outbreak of political disturbances in Papua New Guinea as part of the Sandline affair. No action was required by the Australian warships.

Sydney was deployed to East Timor as part of the Australian-led INTERFET peacekeeping taskforce from 3 November to 19 December 1999. She received the battle honour "East Timor 1999" for this deployment.

On 1 October 2000, Sydney took over from sister ship Newcastle as the RAN vessel assigned to support the peace negotiation process in the Solomon Islands that resulted in the signing of the Townsville Peace Agreement.

In October 2001, Sydney returned to the Persian Gulf to operate in support of Operation Enduring Freedom as part of the War in Afghanistan. The frigate was joined by sister ship Adelaide and the amphibious warfare vessel Kanimbla in early December, and returned to Australia in March 2002. Sydney was sent back to the Gulf in support of 2003 invasion of Iraq, operating from May to August 1993 as part of Operations Falconer and Catalyst. The battle honours "Persian Gulf 2001–03" and "Iraq 2003" recognise these deployments.

Sydney was the first of four frigates selected to go under the A$1 billion FFG Upgrade, with HMA Ships Darwin, Melbourne and Newcastle following. The upgrade features an 8-cell Mark 41 Vertical Launch System (VLS) for 32 Evolved Sea Sparrow Missiles (ESSM), upgrades to fire control and air warning radars, and replacement of the hull-mounted sonar and diesel generators. This refit commenced in 2002, but problems with integrating the frigates' anti-missile and anti-torpedo detection and defence systems meant that when Sydney was finished in 2007, she was initially not accepted back into service. By November 2008, the problems with the upgrade had been solved.

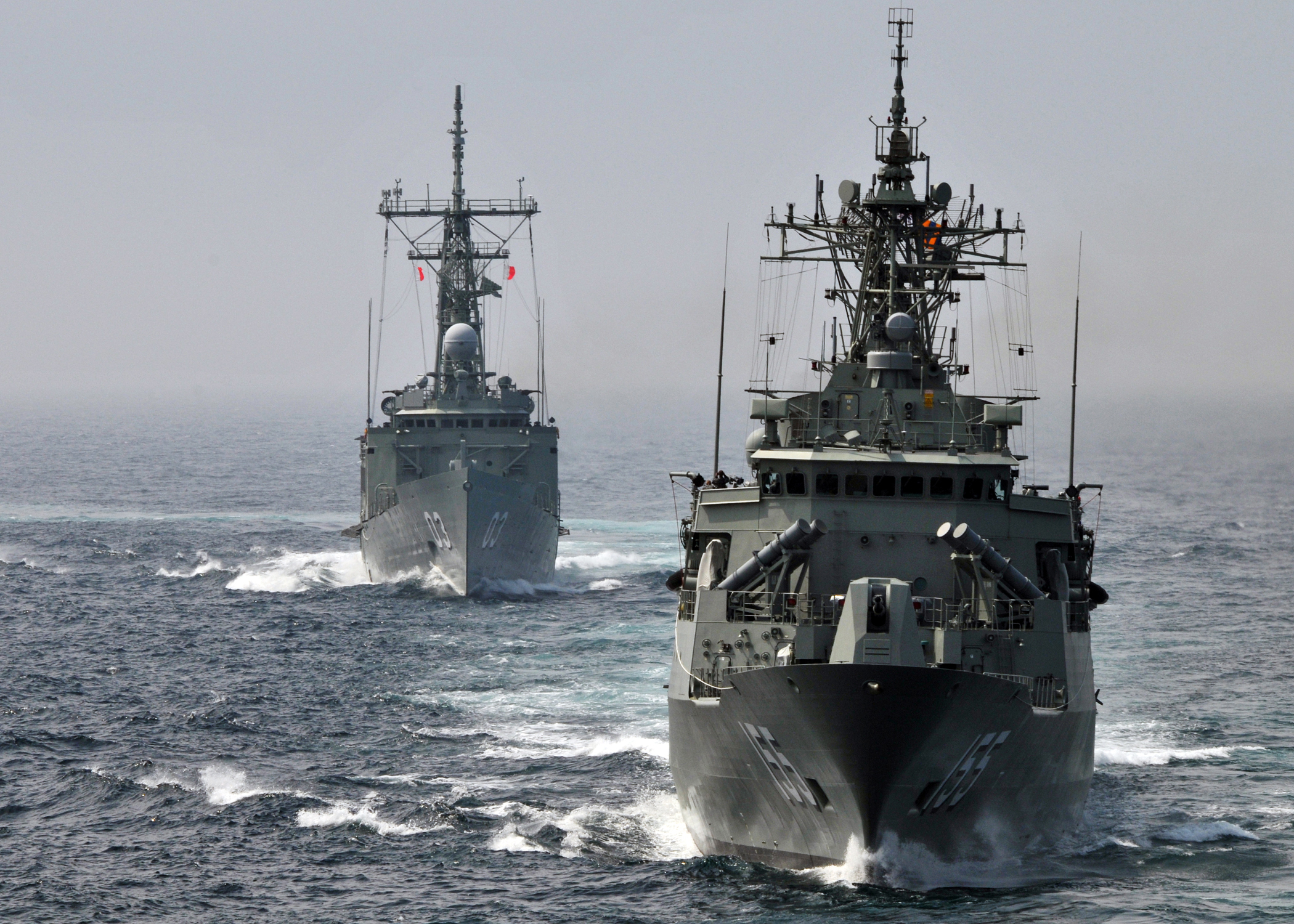
Sydney (rear) maneuvers with Ballarat in 2009

On the morning of 13 March 2009, Sydney was one of seventeen warships involved in a ceremonial fleet entry and fleet review in Sydney Harbour, the largest collection of RAN ships since the Australian Bicentenary in 1988. The frigate led the line of thirteen ships involved in the ceremonial entry through Sydney Heads, and anchored in the harbour for the review.

On 20 April 2009, Sydney and the Anzac-class frigate HMAS Ballarat departed from Sydney as part of Operation Northern Trident, a six-month round-the-world voyage by the two vessels, with numerous diplomatic visits and joint exercises with foreign navies. On 17 May, Sydney and Ballarat provided aid to two merchant vessels in the Gulf of Aden, driving off two separate groups of Somali pirates attacking the ships. Sydney remained in the area to report the incidents to Combined Task Force 151, while Ballarat escorted an impromptu convoy of eight ships, including the two that were attacked, to safety. The two warships visited ports in Western Europe, North America, the Pacific and northern Asia, with Sydney arriving back in her namesake city on 19 September.

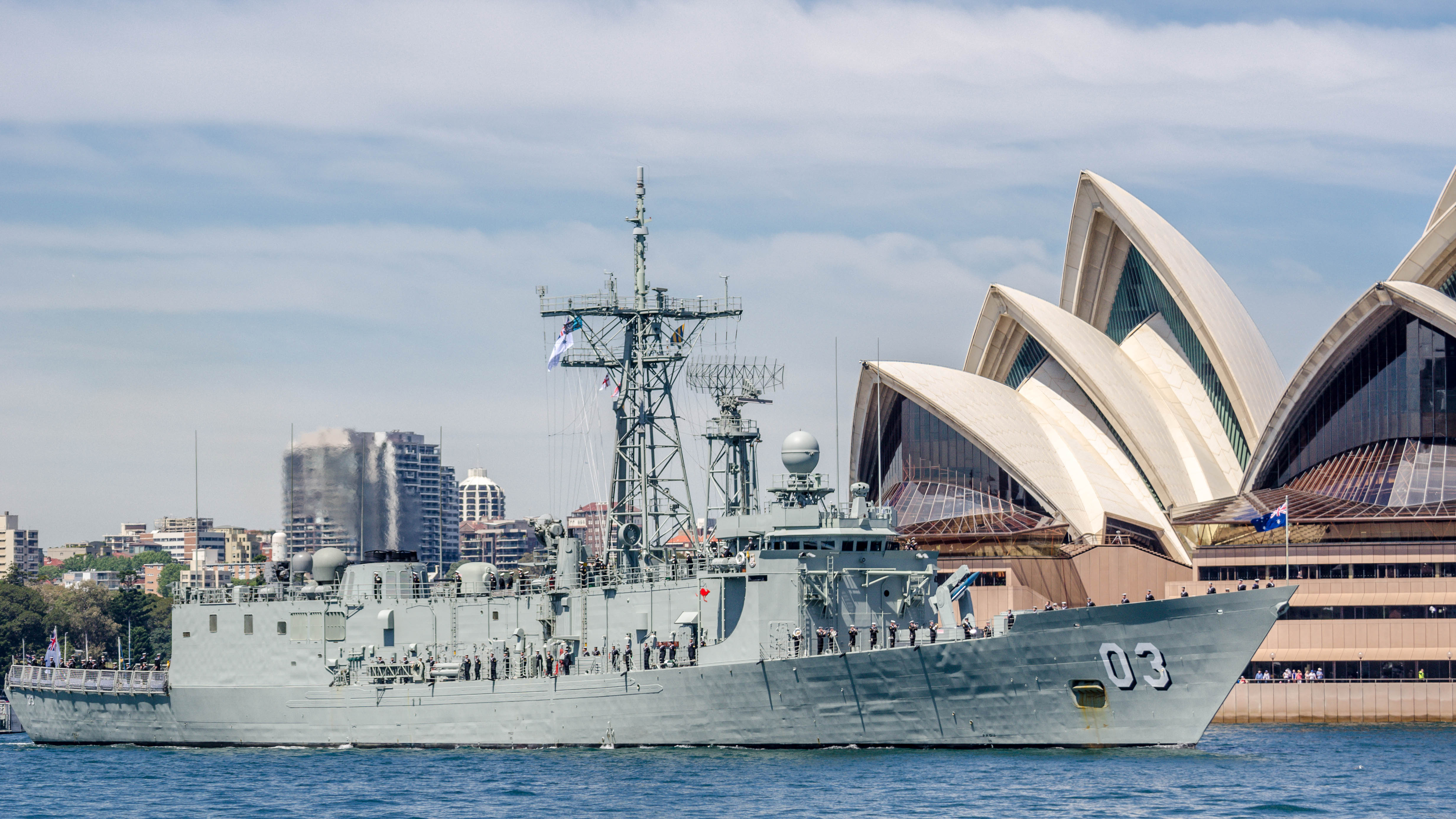
Sydney during the International Fleet Review 2013

In May 2013, Sydney began a three-month deployment with the United States Seventh Fleet, attached to Carrier Strike Group Five as an escort for the carrier USS George Washington.

In October 2013, Sydney participated in the International Fleet Review 2013 in Sydney.

Sydney visited Hobart in February 2015 for the Royal Hobart Regatta. During the weekend of 7–8 February, the frigate was anchored in the River Derwent to free up wharf space for a civilian vessel. On attempting to return to Macquarie Wharf, the anchor chain broke, leaving the anchor 25 metres (82 ft) below. The anchor was later recovered by divers. The loss of the anchor prevented Sydney from fulfilling duties as the regatta flagship, as the ship would be unable to maintain a stationary position during the event.

== Decommissioning and fate ==
Sydney sailed into her namesake city for the final time on 27 February 2015. Despite flying a decommissioning pennant, the ship was not paid off until 7 November 2015; two years later than originally expected. In the interim, she was moored at Fleet Base East as an alongside training ship.

On 6 November, the day prior to paying off, a parade of 350 current and former personnel from the ship marched in Sydney. At the time of decommissioning, Sydney had travelled 959,627 nautical miles (1,777,229 km; 1,104,319 mi). She will be replaced by one of the three Hobart-class destroyers.

In April 2016, the Navy offered Sydney for use as a dive wreck to Australia's states and territories, in the same manner as her sisters Adelaide and Canberra. However, the decision to utilise the ship in this way has been condemned by different organisations, with calls for it to be restored as a memorial to the modern RAN. No organisations expressed interest in using the ship as a dive wreck, and in May 2017 Sydney departed under tow for Western Australia where she was to be scrapped.

In May 2017, the Sydney was towed to Henderson, Western Australia to be scrapped. A former Todd Shipyards employee informed the company doing the scrapping, Birdon, that a miniature of MacNoughton Canadian Whisky "wrapped in insulation tape, was apparently hidden inside the forward starboard leg of the main mast of HMAS Sydney by the team that built her at the Todd Pacific Shipyards in Seattle in 1982. The date, 10 April 1982 was also scribbled on the label." The bottle was retrieved from its hiding place of 35 years.
