= HMAS Adelaide (FFG 01) =

Frigate of the Royal Australian Navy, lead ship of the class

Coordinates: 33°28′0″S 151°27′0″E

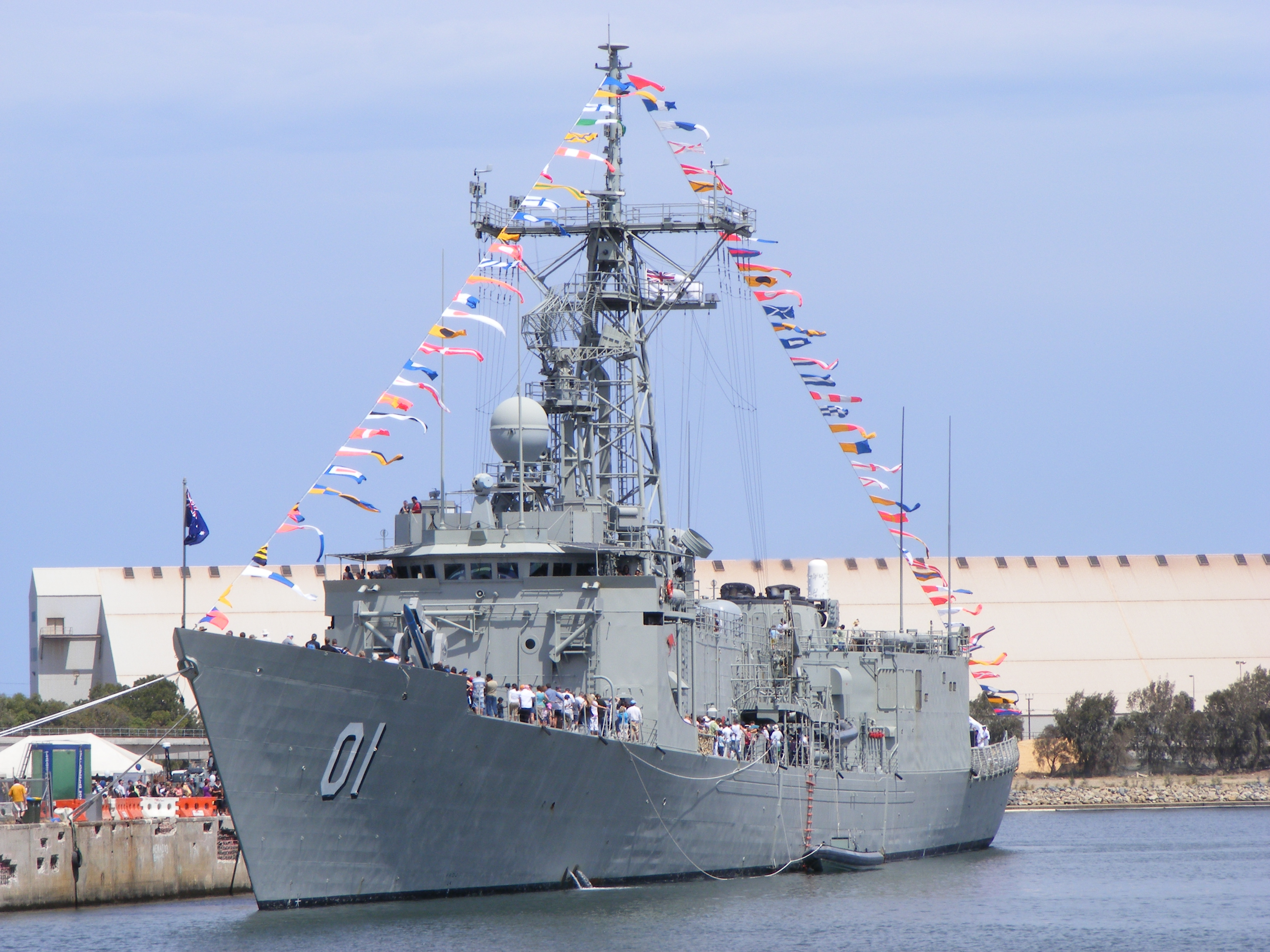
- HMAS Adelaide docked at Port Adelaide for an open day in 2007

History

Australia
- Namesake: City of Adelaide
- Builder: Todd Pacific Shipyards, Seattle
- Laid down: 29 July 1977
- Launched: 21 June 1978
- Commissioned: 15 November 1980
- Decommissioned: 19 January 2008
- Motto: "United For The Common Good"
- Nickname(s): FFG-17 (US hull designation during construction)
- Honours and awards: Battle honours: East Timor 1999; Persian Gulf 2001–02; plus two inherited honours
- Fate: Sunk as dive wreck

General characteristics
- Class & type: Adelaide-class guided missile frigate
- Displacement: 4,100 tons
- Length: 138.1 m (453.1 ft) overall
- Beam: 13.7 m (44.9 ft)
- Draught: 7.5 m (24.6 ft)
- Propulsion: 2 × General Electric LM2500 gas turbines, 41,000 hp (30,574 kW), 1 shaft; 2 × 650 hp (485 kW) auxiliary propulsors
- Speed: 29 knots (54 km/h; 33 mph)
- Range: 4,500 nmi (8,334 km; 5,179 mi) at 20 knots (37 km/h; 23 mph)
- Complement: 184 (including 15 officers, not including aircrew)
- Sensors & processing systems: AN/SPS-49 air search radar; AN/SPS-55 surface search and navigation radar; SPG-60 fire control radar (Mark 92 fire control system); AN/SQS-56 hull-mounted sonar
- Armament: 1 × Mark 13 Missile Launcher for Harpoon and Standard missiles; 2 × Mark 32 torpedo tubes; 1 × OTO Melara 76 mm naval gun; 1 × 20 mm Phalanx CIWS; Up to 6 × 12.7 mm (0.50 in) machine guns; 2 × M2HB .50 calibre Mini Typhoons (fitted as required)
- Aircraft carried: 2 × S-70B Seahawk or 1 × Seahawk and 1 × AS350B Squirrel

HMAS Adelaide (FFG 01) was the lead ship of the Adelaide class of guided missile frigates built for the Royal Australian Navy (RAN), based on the United States Navy's Oliver Hazard Perry-class frigates. She was built in the United States and commissioned into the RAN in 1980.

During her career, Adelaide was part of Australian responses or contributions to the 1987 Fijian coups d'état, the Iraq invasion of Kuwait, the Indonesian riots of May 1998, the INTERFET peacekeeping taskforce, the War in Afghanistan, and the United States-led invasion of Iraq. In 1997, the frigate rescued two competitors in the 1996–97 Vendée Globe solo, round-the-world yacht race. In 2001, a boat carrying suspected illegal immigrants was intercepted by Adelaide; the events of this interception became the centre of the Children overboard affair.

In 2008, Adelaide was the second ship of the class to be decommissioned, in order to offset the cost of an upgrade to the other four vessels. This ship was to be sunk off Avoca Beach, New South Wales as a dive wreck on 27 March 2010, until an appeal to the Administrative Appeals Tribunal by protest groups led to a postponement of the scuttling until additional cleanup work was completed. Despite further attempts to delay or cancel the scuttling, Adelaide was sunk off Avoca on 13 April 2011.

== Design and construction ==
Following the cancellation of the Australian light destroyer project in 1973, the British Type 42 destroyer and the American Oliver Hazard Perry-class frigate were identified as alternatives to replace the cancelled light destroyers and the Daring-class destroyers. Although the Oliver Hazard Perry class was still at the design stage, the difficulty of fitting the Type 42 with the SM-1 missile, and the success of the Perth-class acquisition (a derivative of the American Charles F. Adams-class destroyer) compared to equivalent British designs led the Australian government to approve the purchase of two US-built Oliver Hazard Perry-class frigates (including Adelaide) in 1976. A third was ordered in 1977, followed by a fourth, with all four ships integrated into the USN's shipbuilding program. A further two ships were ordered in 1980, and were constructed in Australia.

As designed, the ship had a full load displacement of 3,605 tons, a length overall of 135.6 metres (444.9 ft), a beam of 13.7 metres (44.9 ft), and a draught of 24.5 metres (80.4 ft). Early in the ship's career, she was modified from the Oliver Hazard Perry Flight I design to Flight III, requiring a lengthening of the helicopter deck for the RAST helicopter recovery system, increasing the displacement to 4,100 tons and pushing the overall length to 138.1 metres (453.1 ft). Propulsion machinery consisted of two General Electric LM2500 gas turbines, which provided a combined 41,000 horsepower (31,000 kW) to the single propeller shaft. Top speed was 29 knots (54 km/h; 33 mph), with a range of 4,500 nautical miles (8,334 km; 5,179 mi) at 20 knots (37 km/h; 23 mph). Two 650-horsepower (480 kW) electric auxiliary propulsors were used for close manoeuvring, with a top speed of 4 knots (7.4 km/h; 4.6 mph). The standard ship's company was 184, including 15 officers, but excluding the flight crew for the embarked helicopters.

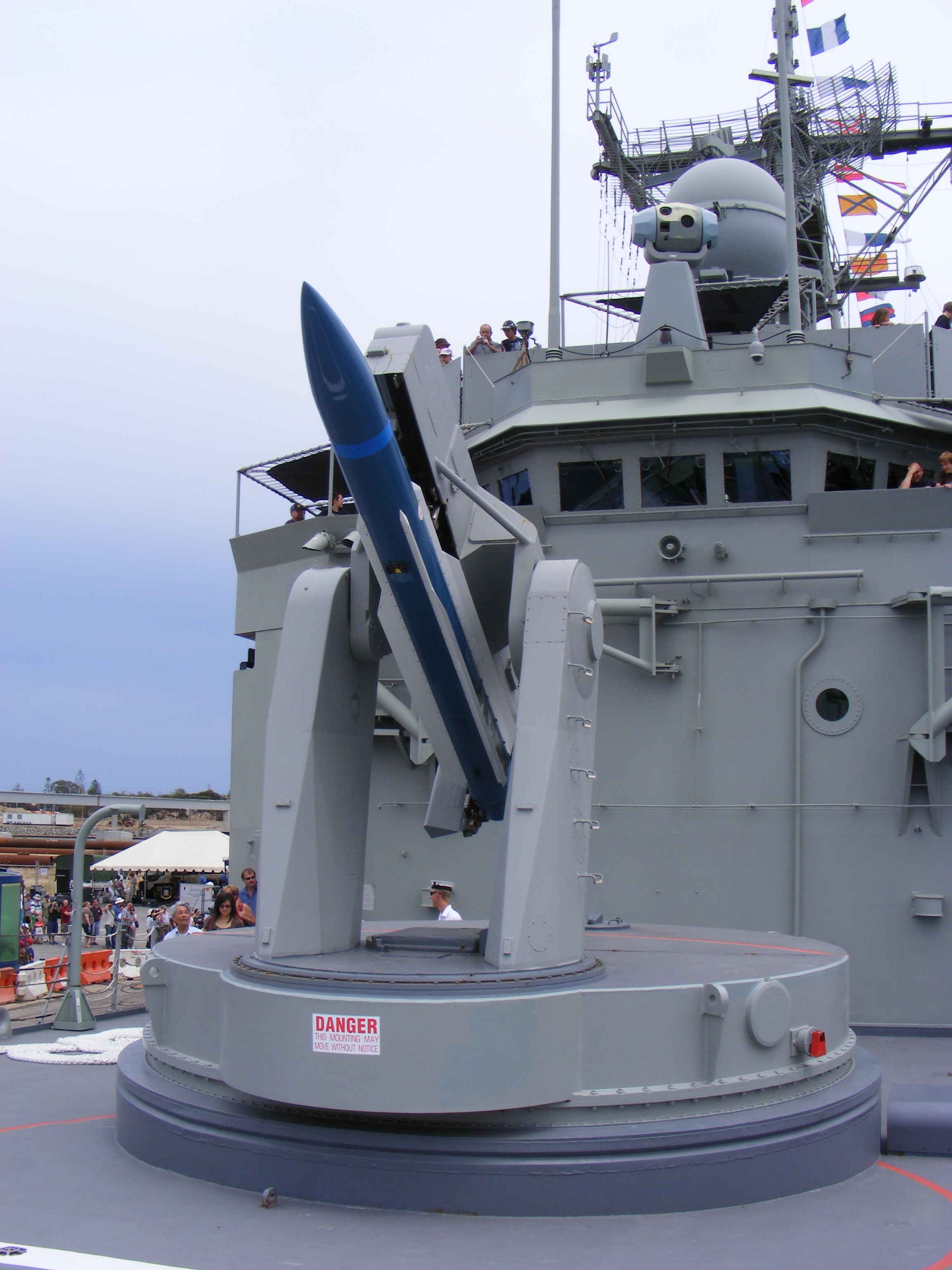
Adelaide's Mark 13 launcher, with a dummy Standard missile loaded

The original armament for the ship consisted of a Mark 13 missile launcher configured to fire RIM-66 Standard and RGM-84 Harpoon missiles, supplemented by an OTO Melara 76-millimetre (3 in) gun and a Vulcan Phalanx point-defence system. For anti-submarine warfare, two Mark 32 torpedo tube sets were fitted; originally firing the Mark 44 torpedo, the Adelaides later carried the Mark 46 torpedoes. Up to six 12.7-millimetre (0.50 in) machine guns were carried for close-in defence, and beginning in 2005, two M2HB .50 calibre machine guns in Mini Typhoon mounts were installed when needed for Persian Gulf deployments. The sensor suite included an AN/SPS-49 air search radar, AN/SPS-55 surface search and navigation radar, SPG-60 fire control radar connected to a Mark 92 fire control system, and an AN/SQS-56 hull-mounted sonar. Two helicopters could be embarked: either two S-70B Seahawk or one Seahawk and one AS350B Squirrel.

Adelaide was laid down to the Oliver Hazard Perry class' Flight I design at Todd Pacific Shipyards at Seattle on 29 July 1977, launched on 21 June 1978 by Lady Ann Synnot (wife of Chief of Naval Staff Admiral Sir Anthony Synnot), and commissioned into the Royal Australian Navy on 15 November 1980. During construction, she was identified with the United States Navy hull number FFG-17. A total of four Adelaide-class ships were constructed by Todd Pacific, with a further two built by Australian shipbuilder AMECON.

== Operational history ==
After commissioning, Adelaide and Canberra remained in the United States to work up; during this time both ships were attached to the United States Navy's Destroyer Squadron 9. The frigate ran aground off Seattle in early 1981, during post-commissioning trials, but was freed with only minor damage.

Following the decommissioning of the aircraft carrier HMAS Melbourne in 1982 and the disbandment of fixed-wing aviation squadrons in 1984, the RAN Fleet Air Arm became focused on helicopter operations, but had minimal experience flying helicopters from small ships. To remedy this, a Bell Kiowa was embarked aboard Adelaide during 1984. Adelaide was awarded the Gloucester Cup for being the most efficient ship in the RAN during 1984.

In May 1987, Adelaide visited Fiji, and was alongside in Lautoka when the first of the 1987 Fijian coups d'état occurred on 14 May. Adelaide and sister ship Sydney, alongside in Suva, were instructed to remain off Fiji to aid in any necessary evacuation of Australian citizens; the first component of what became Operation Morris Dance. Adelaide remained on station until at least 29 May, when a phased withdrawal began.

On 3 July 1990, Adelaide became the first Australian warship to visit Tahiti since 1970. On 10 August, Adelaide, sister ship Darwin, and the replenishment ship Success were deployed to the Middle East as part of Operation Damask, Australia's participation in the international coalition enforcing sanctions against Iraq following that nation's invasion of Kuwait. Adelaide and Darwin remained in the area until 3 December, and was used for surveillance and boarding operations. In October 1992, Adelaide's home port was changed to HMAS Stirling, making her the first ship of the class homeported in Western Australia under the Two-Ocean Policy.

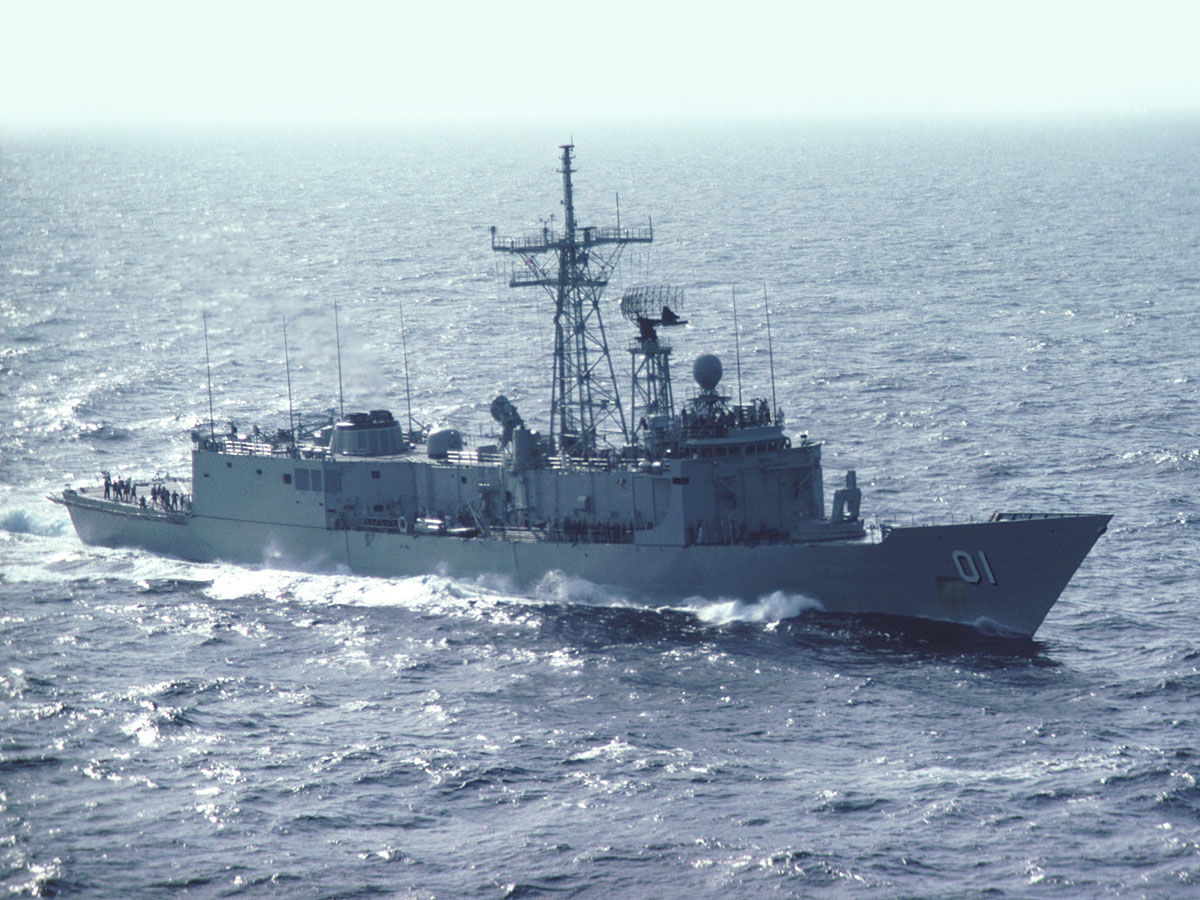
Adelaide underway in 1982

In January 1997, the yachts of Thierry Dubois and Tony Bullimore (competitors in the 1996–97 Vendée Globe solo, round-the-world yacht race), capsized while attempting to cross the Southern Ocean. Adelaide successfully found and rescued the sailors after seven days of searching by ships and aircraft. During late May and early June, the frigate was deployed to the Philippines, and represented Australia at the Philippines Centenary International Naval Review.

Between 17 and 27 May 1998, Adelaide was one of four RAN ships placed on standby, in case Australian citizens required evacuation if the Indonesian riots of May 1998 escalated. The ships were not used. Starting in September, the frigate accompanied the destroyers Hobart and Brisbane on a cruise through South East Asia. During this deployment, the ships were present at a naval review by Indonesian president B. J. Habibie.

In February 1999, Adelaide was awarded the Duke of Gloucester Cup awarded to the most efficient ship in the RAN during the previous year. The frigate was deployed to East Timor as part of the Australian-led INTERFET peacekeeping taskforce from 19 September to 19 October.

On 6 October 2001, Adelaide was the ship which intercepted SIEV 4, the event which sparked the Children overboard affair. Under orders to prevent SIEVs from entering Australian waters, Adelaide attempted to warn the craft, carrying over 200 passengers (including children), against crossing from international waters during the night and into 7 October. When the SIEV failed to heed these warnings, Adelaide fired warning shots and initiated a RHIB boarding action, with the boarding party took control of the craft that afternoon. Between this time and when the craft was manoeuvred from Australian territory late the next morning, several attempts were made to sabotage the craft, and some adult passengers jumped or were thrown overboard while others threatened to do so; the fourteen people that entered the water were recovered by the frigate's RHIB and taken back to the SIEV. Adelaide observed the craft as it headed towards Indonesia, and moved in to provide further assistance a few hours later, after systematic sabotage immobilised the small vessel. Adelaide was instructed to take the vessel in tow and head for Christmas Island. The SIEV began to take on water during the afternoon of 8 October, and despite the appearance that the problem had been rectified, the craft sank without warning at 17:00. All aboard were forced into the water, and were rescued by personnel from Adelaide. Reports of the sinking were conflated with information about those who jumped or were thrown overboard the day previous to give the impression that the threat of throwing children overboard had been made or carried out, a story that was later proven false but taken up at the time by the Howard government during the lead-up to the 2001 election to support their campaign promises to tighten border controls and immigration.

From November 2001 to March 2002, Adelaide and the amphibious warfare ship Kanimbla were deployed to the Middle East as part of Operation Slipper, the Australian contribution to the War in Afghanistan. The ships also contributed to the continuing enforcement of the Iraq sanctions. Adelaide was deployed on border protection operations on multiple occasions until 2004.

Adelaide returned to the Middle East from July 2004 to January 2005 as part of Operation Catalyst, the Australian contribution to the reconstruction of Iraq following the United States-led invasion in 2003. During this deployment, in December 2004, several gunboats of the Iranian Revolutionary Guard attempted to capture a boarding party after it had inspected the freighter MV Sham, which had grounded near the Iraq-Iran maritime boundary. After completing their inspection, the boarding party returned to their two RHIBs, but were approached by an Iranian gunboat. The boarding party climbed back aboard Sham, took up defensive positions, and, according to BBC reporter Frank Gardner, "warned [the Iranians] to back off, using what was said to be 'highly colourful language'." During the next 45 minutes, four more gunboats arrived, and the stand-off lasted for four hours before the Australians were evacuated by Adelaide's Seahawk helicopter. No shots were fired during the incident, and two of the Australians were later awarded the Distinguished Service Medal for their conduct during the stand-off. The Australian Defence Force did not immediately report the incident to the media, as they felt no need to highlight it, and the attempted capture did not come to light until July 2007, when Gardner wrote about it following the capture of 15 British personnel during a similar incident in March 2007.

A March 2010 reorganisation of battle honours awarded to RAN ships saw Adelaide retroactively honoured for her service with INTERFET ("East Timor 1999") and during the War in Afghanistan ("Persian Gulf 2001–02").

== Decommissioning and fate ==
Adelaide was originally scheduled to be paid off in November 2006, but delays with the project to upgrade four of Adelaide's sister ships required that she be kept in service for another fourteen months to minimise the impact on the fleet. Adelaide was decommissioned on 19 January 2008 at HMAS Stirling, before she was towed to Sydney and given to the Government of New South Wales, which planned to sink her as a dive wreck off the coast near Terrigal: the first military ship dive wreck in New South Wales. After spending time alongside at HMAS Kuttabul, Adelaide was towed to White Bay at a point prior to November 2009.

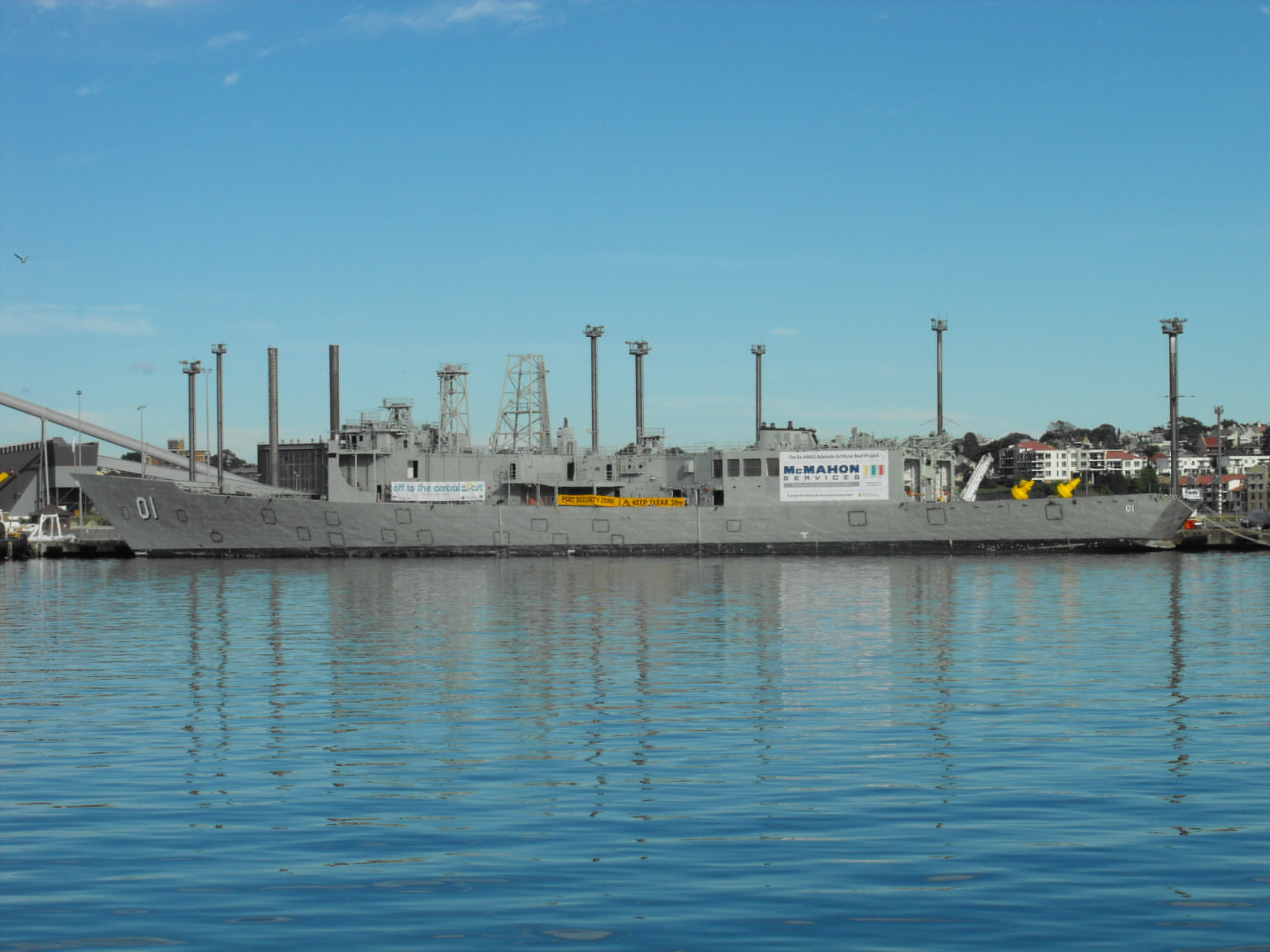
Adelaide tied up at White Bay in April 2010. The vessel has been prepared for scuttling: weapons and systems have been removed, masts have been cut short, and diver access holes have been prepared.

The ship was prepared for scuttling by McMahon Services during late 2009 and early 2010: her mast (which would have become a navigational hazard once the ship was scuttled) was removed, dangerous materials and toxins were removed, and access holes were cut in the ship's flanks. The ship was scheduled to be sunk on 27 March, 1.7 kilometres (1.1 mi) offshore from Avoca Beach, in 32 metres (105 ft) of water. Local resident action groups campaigned to prevent the scuttling, claiming that the wreck would affect tides and littoral sand drift, and that the removal of chemicals and hazardous materials in the ship had not been thorough enough, with the chance that marine life and people could be poisoned.

An appeal by the protest groups to the Administrative Appeals Tribunal three days before the sinking saw the project placed on hold until the case could be heard in full: supporters and opponents of the dive wreck agreed to participate in mediation in the meantime. The case was to be heard on 5 May, but was later postponed to July. On 15 September, the Tribunal ruled that scuttling of the ship could go ahead after the removal of any remaining wiring, which may contain polychlorinated biphenyls, canvas, insulation, and exfoliating red lead paint. The delays caused by the tribunal hearing meant that the original $5.8 million assigned to the scuttling project was expended, and the tribunal hearing, additional cleanup, and berthing fees brought the cost of the scuttling project to $8.5 million.

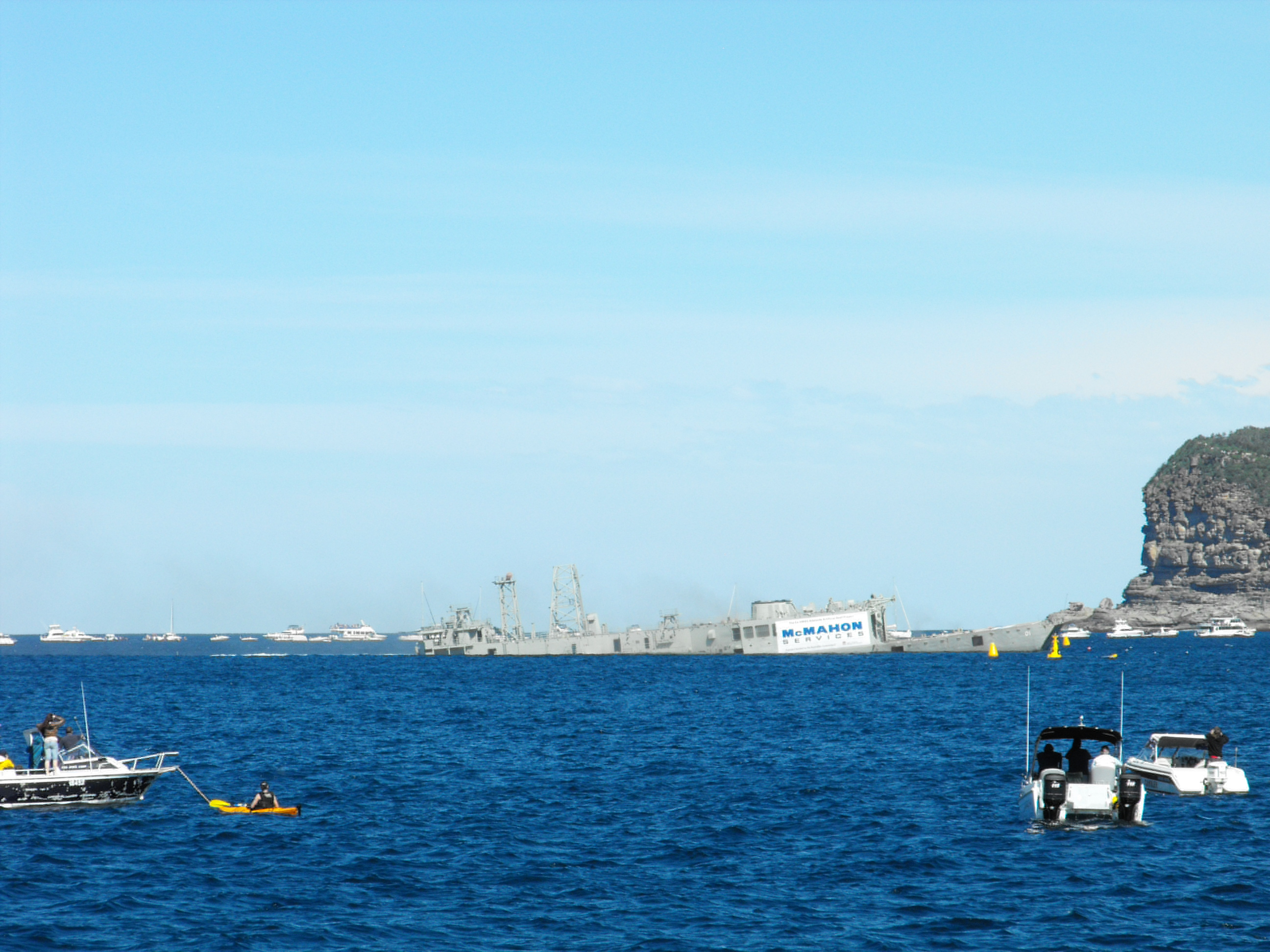
Adelaide submerging after the scuttling charges were fired

A new scuttling date was announced on 24 February 2011 by NSW Lands Minister Tony Kelly, with Adelaide scheduled to be sunk on 13 April 2011, after the additional cleaning ordered by the Administrative Appeals Tribunal was completed in March. Adelaide was towed from Sydney Harbour on the morning of 11 April for the voyage north. The action group attempted to cancel or further delay the sinking of the warship, requesting that the New South Wales Ombudsman investigate the government's handling of the artificial reef project, filing a summons in the Land and Environment Court of New South Wales on the afternoon of 12 April, and asking an Aboriginal 'whale caller' to summon humpback whales to the planned wreck site. Despite this, the sinking went ahead just before midday on 13 April, after being delayed by over an hour by a pod of dolphins inside the 1 kilometre (0.6 mi) exclusion zone. After the scuttling charges were fired, Adelaide submerged within two minutes.

As an artificial reef, the aluminum superstructure of the ship has suffered galvanic corrosion. With the superstructure weakened, a storm and heavy seas in 2024 removed the superstructure from the vessel and deposited it on the seabed on the port side of the vessel. Most reef life was also swept away from the vessel by the storm.
