= Operation Provide Comfort =

1991–1996 Gulf War military operation

Operation Provide Comfort/Provide Comfort II
- Part of the Iraqi no-fly zones conflict
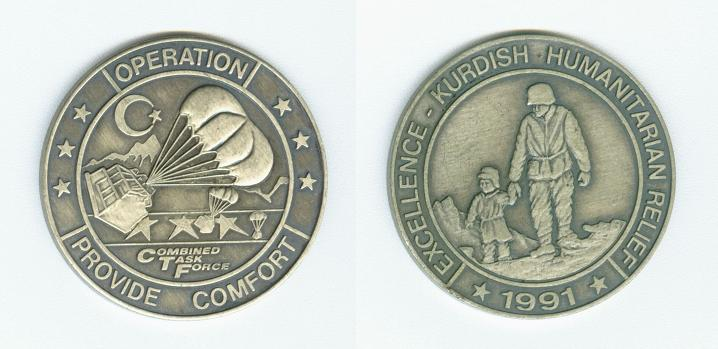
- Commemorative medallion issued to some participating US soldiers
Date	March 1991 – 31 December 1996
Location	Northern Iraq
Result	Establishment of Kurdish de facto autonomous region in northern Iraq

Belligerents
United States; Peshmerga; United Kingdom; Germany; France; Australia; Netherlands; Turkey; Italy; Spain; Portugal	Iraq; Support: Belarus

Commanders and leaders
(United States) John Shalikashvili	(Ba'athist Iraq) Saddam Hussein

Casualties and losses
2 UH-60 Black Hawk helicopters downed by friendly fire with 26 killed 5 US servicemen killed and 25 wounded 3 UK servicemen wounded 2 Dutch servicemen wounded Total: 31 killed, 30 wounded	90 killed, 85 wounded Many air defense systems destroyed 1 MiG-23 Flogger shot down 1–2 Su-22 Fitters shot down

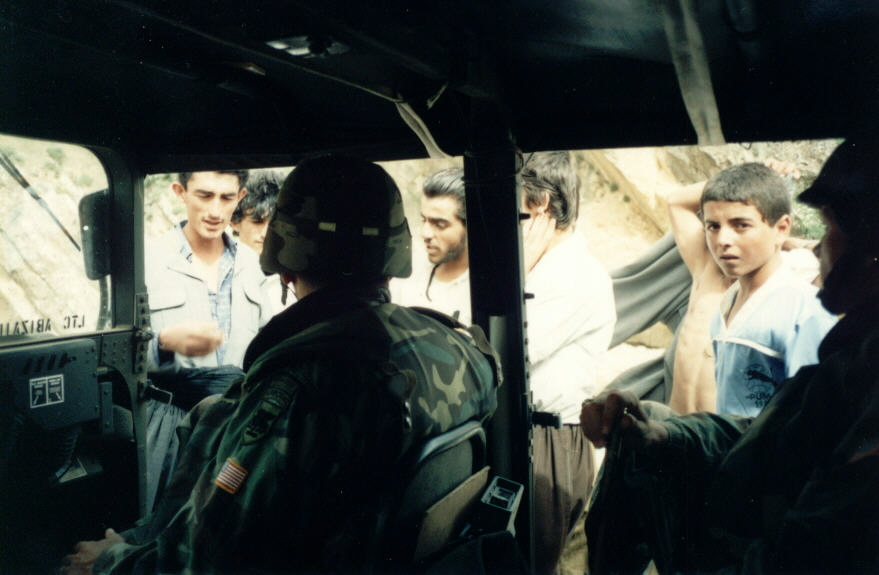
Then-Lt. Col. John Abizaid speaking with some Kurds in Northern Iraq during Operation Provide Comfort, 1991

Operation Provide Comfort and Provide Comfort II were military operations initiated by the United States and other Coalition nations of the Persian Gulf War, starting in April 1991, to defend Kurdish refugees fleeing their homes in northern Iraq in the aftermath of the Gulf War, and to deliver humanitarian aid to them. The no-fly zone instituted to help bring this about would become one of the main factors allowing the development of the semi-autonomous Kurdistan Region.

== Summary ==
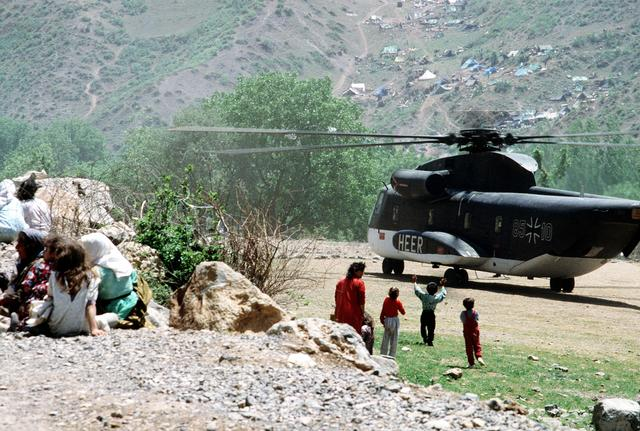
Kurdish refugee children run toward a CH-53G helicopter of the German Army during Operation Provide Comfort

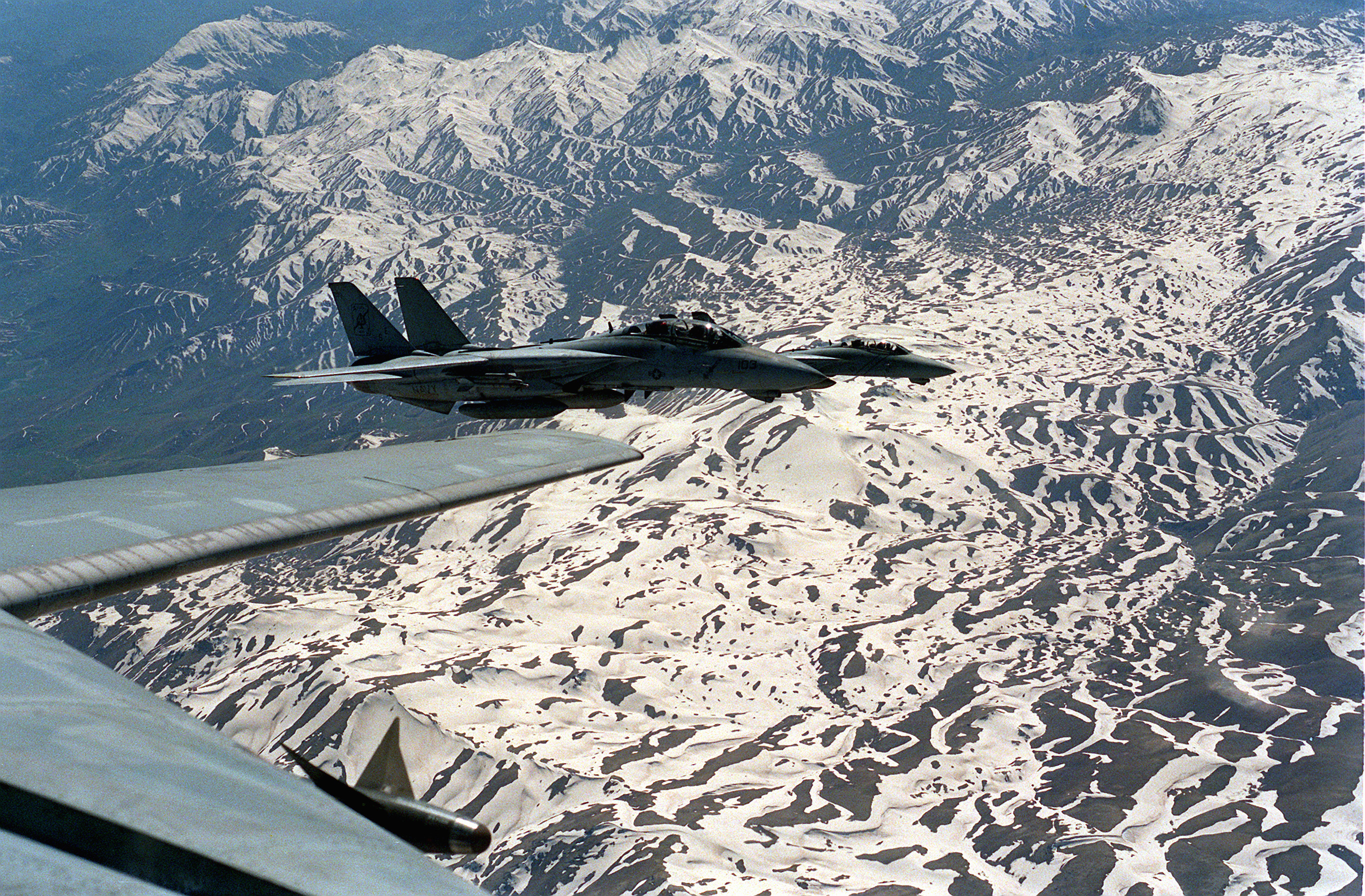
As seen from the cockpit of a Fighter Squadron 41 (VF-41) F-14A Tomcat aircraft, a Fighter Squadron 84 (VF-84) Tomcat, background, and another VF-41 Tomcat fly in formation at an aerial refueling meeting point during Operation Provide Comfort

Operation Haven (the UK's name for the operation) was a UK-headed initiative, made at a time when the US was fundamentally uninterested in any further taking of action in the Persian Gulf region. John Major, the British prime minister at the time, lobbied for other European states to support the mission, which resulted in NATO's support and leveraged the necessary US air support. Then, as Saddam Hussein's retributive activities intensified, US ground and logistic support was also achieved. This was a distinctly UK-headed operation though, with a proposed force of 6,000 personnel, spearheaded by 3 Commando Brigade, Royal Marines, with elements from the UK's army, the Royal Air Force, and other coalition member states. It was deemed dramatically successful, even though it appeared to be risky given the climate of those times, as Operation Haven operated within Iraq. The Coalition's main task was to enter northern Iraq, clear the designated area of any Iraqi threat and establish a safe environment for the Kurdish refugees to return to their homes. The mission was both a military one and humanitarian as once security had been established, the US would provide air support and specialist elements along with other Coalition members, supply and rebuilding of infrastructure would then be initiated. The ground mission within Iraq took 58 days to complete. Operation Provide Comfort (i.e. Haven) officially ended on 24 July 1991, shortly after the enforcement of the "No Fly Zone" continued to ensure Kurdish security in the region.

=== US participation and events ===
The 1991 uprising in northern Iraq resulted in an Iraqi military response towards the rebels in both northern and southern Iraq. Fearing another genocide like what had happened during the 1988 Anfal campaign, millions of Kurds fled towards the border with Iran and Turkey.

On 3 March, General Norman Schwarzkopf warned the Iraqis that Coalition aircraft would shoot down Iraqi military aircraft flying over the country. On 20 March, a US F-15C Eagle fighter aircraft shot down an Iraqi Air Force Su-22 Fitter fighter-bomber over northern Iraq. On 22 March, another F-15 destroyed a second Su-22 and the pilot of an Iraqi PC-9 trainer bailed out after being approached by US fighter planes.

On 5 April, the United Nations Security Council passed Resolution 688, calling on Iraq to end repression of its civilian population. On 6 April, Operation Provide Comfort began to bring humanitarian relief to the Kurds. A no-fly zone was established by the US, the UK, and France north of the 36th parallel, as part of the Iraqi no-fly zones. This was enforced by US, UK, and French aircraft. Included in this effort was the delivery of humanitarian relief of over an estimated 1 million Kurdish refugees by a 6-nation airlift operation commanded from Incirlik Air Base Turkey involving aircraft from the US, UK, France, Germany, Canada, and Italy. Soviet aircraft participated in logistical aspects of the operation. The airlift was commanded by Colonel Dave Wall, Wing Commander, Aviano Air Base, Italy. Intel and Planning Section Chief was Lt. Colonel Mike DeCapua who coordinated drop zone locations and unique aircraft loads. During the 31-day airlift, more tonnage was delivered and more air miles flown than in the entire Berlin Airlift. C-130s and other transport aircraft flew air drop missions under AWACS control with A-10s and F-16s providing air and ground fire support for the airlift aircraft. On several occasions A-10s neutralized Iraqi radar units in the Zaku area.

Units of the 18th Military Police Brigade, commanded by Colonel Lucious Delk, and a forward Headquarters Command Cell led by Captain Alan Mahan, and Sergeant Major Ed Deane, with units of the 709th Military Police Battalion, the 284th Military Police Company, the 527th Military Police Company and 3rd Platoon of the 202d Military Police Company, provided security of the headquarters, Kurdish refugee camps, and convoy security. The brigade was the last unit to leave the area at the conclusion of operations. Several members of the 202d Military Police Company received the Soldier's Medal after calling in and assisting in the medical evacuation of a wounded Iraqi citizen from a minefield near the river not far from the MP headquarters camp.

While Operations Desert Shield and Desert Storm were run by the US Central Command (CENTCOM), Operation Provide Comfort came under the authority of the US European Command (EUCOM), headquartered in Vaihingen, Germany. On-ground humanitarian aid was provided by the 353rd Civil Affairs Command commanded by BG Donald Campbell, and by its subordinate units, 432nd Civil Affairs Battalion, and 431st Civil Affairs Battalion. These units were relocated to Turkey and northern Iraq after completing missions in Kuwait. The 353rd also had liaison officers assigned to HQ EUCOM and to the US Mission to the United Nations, Geneva. The 353rd were soon joined in Iraq by Lieutenant Colonel Ted Sahlin's 96th Civil Affairs Battalion (Airborne) from Fort Bragg, North Carolina, which had only returned to the US two weeks before after having been deployed to Saudi Arabia, Iraq and Kuwait for the past 10 months. The base camps that were established for Kurdish refugees were nicknamed Camp Jayhawk and Camp Badger after college mascots. Other camps were established in Silopi, Turkey. The first troops to arrive were the 36th Civil Engineering Squadron from Bitburg Air Base Germany. Smaller "detachment" camps were also built in and around Zakho, Iraq and Sirsenk, Iraq by these same members and were led by Captain Donald Gleason from Ramstein Air Force base and USAF Security Policemen from RAF Bentwaters and RAF Lakenheath. He led a team of fifteen that is now known as the first Air Force unit to enter Iraq. Supplies for these camps were sourced from a variety of areas including units that were returning to the US, Coalition countries, European military stocks, and civilian contractors in the US. Many supplies had to be airdropped due to restrictions by the Turkish government for entering Iraq through their border.

Also deployed to Zakho from their main-body deployment site in Rota, Spain, was Naval Mobile Construction Battalion 133, homeported in Gulfport, Mississippi, commanded by Commander Donald Hutchins. It provided humanitarian aid, water wells, and minor repairs to Sirsink air field. Like its Air Force counterparts, it was the first Naval Mobile Construction Battalion to enter Iraq prior to Operation Iraqi Freedom. Carrier Strike Group 6 commenced its 21st and final operational deployment on 30 May 1991. During this period it provided air power presence and airborne intelligence support (the airwing flew over 900 sorties over Iraq) to the Combined Joint Task Forces of Operation Provide Comfort and Operation Northern Watch enforcing the northern "no-fly zone" in Iraq. It completed this deployment on 23 December 1991.

Lieutenant General John Shalikashvili commanded the overall operation and later became Chairman of the Joint Chiefs of Staff. Task Force Bravo, the in-country multi-national element of the operation was commanded by Major General Jay Garner, US Army, who was later appointed a Special Representative to Iraq under the George W. Bush administration.

The first conventional units to cross into Iraq and enter Zakho were US marines on April 20, 1991, when two companies of infantry were airlifted into Zakho, where around 300 regular Iraqi Army infantry and armored vehicles from the 66th Special Assault Brigade were still present posing as police. The Marines had been preceded by 1st Battalion, 10th Special Forces Group (who were inserted into Iraq on 13 April 1991). The 24th Marine Expeditionary Unit was commanded by Colonel James L. Jones. The MEU consisted of the 24th MEU command element, Battalion Landing team 2/8 (BLT 2/8) under Lt. Colonel Tony Corwin, Composite Helicopter Squadron 264 (HMM-264) Led by Lt. Colonel Joseph Byrtus Jr. and MEU service support group 24 (MSSG-24) led by Lieutenant Colonel Richard Kohl, counting about 2,000 marines. The Marine Expeditionary Unit had been under the command of Commodore Turner, commander, Mediterranean Amphibious Ready Group 1–91, aboard his flagship USS Guadalcanal, but were transferred to Combine Task Force (CFT) Provide Comfort on 14 April and was 3 months into a 6-month routine Mediterranean deployment. The 24th MEU would initially serve as the command to a regiment sized force consisting of all MEU elements, 697 Royal Marines from 45 Commando (22 April), commanded by Lieutenant Colonel Jonathan Thompson and 400 marines from the Dutch 1st Amphibious Combat Group (1st ACG) commanded by Lieutenant Colonel Cees Van Egmond (arrived 23 April) for purposes of containing Zakho until the Iraqi forces would withdraw from the area. On 29 April, 3rd Commando Brigade took back command of 45 Commando, 29th Commando Regiment, Royal Artillery and the 1st ACG for expanded operations to the east. On 4 May, BLT 2/8 commenced operations to the south of Zakho along the route to Dohuk. The MEU then began to move back to Silopi, beginning with the BLT on June 15. 24th MEU left northern Iraq on July 15 and embarked on 19 July for the United States, ending its 6-month deployment.

The 24th MEU (SOC) along with Joint Task Force Bravo(Task Force Alpha was responsible for the Kurd camps in the mountains) grew in size in the days following April 20. The MEU was joined by 4th Brigade (Aviation), 3rd Infantry Division, 18th Engineer Brigade, Naval Mobil Construction Battalion 133, 18th Military Police Brigade, 418th Civil Affairs Battalion USAR, 432nd Civil Affairs Battalion USAR, and 431st Civil Affairs Battalion USAR, Canadian 4th Field Ambulance, 3d Battalion, 325th Infantry (Airborne)(reinforced)(arriving on 27 April), 40 Commando, 29 Commando Regiment, Royal Artillery, the French 8th Marine Parachute Infantry (Cougar Force), a Spanish expeditionary force formed from the 1st Airborne Brigade, "Roger De Flor" and the Italian Folgore Parachute Brigade. All together military forces from 10 countries participated deploying 20,000 military personnel. The Kurds were housed in Camp Jahawk and Camp Badger. The mayor of Jayhawk was MAJ Carl Fisher and the mayor of Badger was MAJ John Elliott.

The US contributed to the operation with the United Kingdom who providing the initiative and significant ground and air forces with 3 Commando Brigade and the RAF. Other allies included France, the Netherlands and Australia. The UK deployed 40 and 45 Commando Royal Marines and air transport assets to help protect refugees and to deliver humanitarian aid. The UK used the name Operation Haven. France deployed transport aircraft and special forces, the Netherlands deployed troops from the Korps commando troepen and an Army Medical/Engineering Battalion, and Australia contributed transport aircraft and medical, dental and preventive health teams (under the Australian name, Operation Habitat).

In March 1991 at a refugee camp in Yeşilova, Turkish soldiers, instead of cooperating with the Corps of Royal Marines in relief distribution, were charged with stealing blankets, bed linen, flour and food, including sixty boxes of water, intended for the refugees, forcing the Marines to intervene.

== Operation Provide Comfort II ==
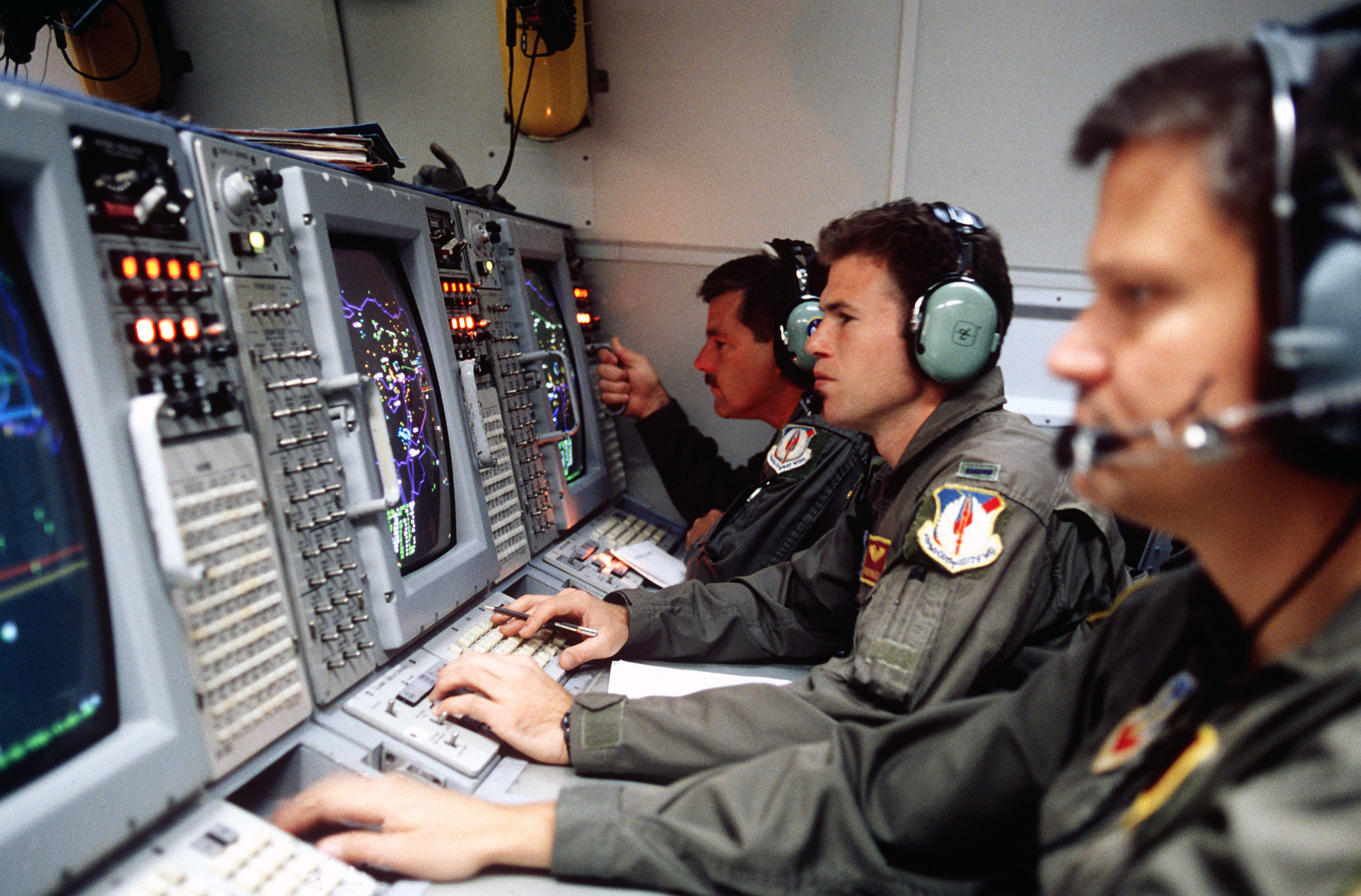
Air controllers aboard an E-3 Sentry in 1995 during Operation Provide Comfort II

Operation Provide Comfort II began on 24 July 1991, the same day Provide Comfort ended. This operation was primarily military in nature, and its mission was to prevent Iraqi aggression against the Kurds.

Partly as a result of Western commitment to the Kurds, Iraqi troops were withdrawn from the Kurdish regions in October 1991 and these areas assumed de facto independence.

On 5 April 1992, the Islamic Republic of Iran Air Force bombed bases in northern Iraq belonging to the Kurdistan Democratic Party of Iran. Iraqi jets were scrambled to intercept the intruders while Coalition aircraft did not interfere.

On 15 January 1993, Iraqi air defense sites opened fire on two USAF F-111 bombers. On 17 January, Iraqi Su-22s fired on two F-16 jets, and a US F-4 Phantom destroyed an Iraqi radar which had been targeting French reconnaissance aircraft. Around a half-hour later, a US F-16 shot down an Iraqi MiG-23 Flogger which had crossed into the no-fly zone. The next day, US F-16s bombed Bashiqah Airfield and F-4 Phantoms attacked Iraqi air defense sites. Over the next few days and months, more Iraqi sites fired on the American patrols, and several were attacked. That August, the USAF deployed the F-15E Strike Eagle aircraft to Turkey, and on 18 August, these aircraft dropped four laser-guided bombs on an Iraqi SA-3 site near Mosul.

On 14 April 1994, two USAF F-15 Eagle fighters on patrol mistakenly downed two US Army Black Hawk helicopters carrying 26 Coalition citizens, killing all aboard.

On 9 December 1995, F-4 Phantom II aircraft of the Idaho Air National Guard finished their tour of duty with Combined Task Force Provide Comfort at Incirlik Air Base. This was the last operational use of the F-4 Phantom by the USAF.

In 31 August 1996, Iraqi troops intervened in the Kurdish regions of Iraq, and the United States responded with Operation Desert Strike against targets in southern Iraq. As a result, some incidents occurred in northern Iraq, and the United States launched an operation to evacuate certain pro-American Kurds from northern Iraq.

The operation ended officially on 31 December 1996 at the request of the Government of Turkey who wanted to improve relations with Iran and Iraq. It was followed by Operation Northern Watch, which began on 1 January 1997 with the mission of enforcing the northern no-fly zone. France declined to participate in Operation Northern Watch.

== See also ==
- Yeşilova incident
