= Operation Habitat =

- Part of Operation Provide Comfort
- Location: Kurdistan, northern Iraq
- Commanded by: Lieutenant Colonel David Ross
- Objective: Humanitarian aid
- Date: 1 May – 30 June 1991
- Executed by: Australian Defence Force

The 1991 uprisings in Iraq were a series of anti-governmental intifada (rebellions) in Southern and Northern Iraq during the aftermath of the Gulf War in March–April 1991. On 16 May 1991, 75 Australian Defence Force (ADF) personnel were deployed to Kurdistan, northern Iraq on Operation Habitat, Australia's contribution to the multinational response known as Operation Provide Comfort.

The goal of this mission was to defend approximately 4 million Kurdish people fleeing their homes in the aftermath of the Gulf War and supply them with humanitarian aid. When the ADF contingent arrived, the situation was improving but was far from normal. The Kurds were living in tents located on the side of the road or in their destroyed villages. Poor water supply and sanitation was a major problem. Temperatures were in the high 40s to low 50s °C and high tens during the night. Accommodation for the ADF personnel consisted of canvas tents.

The ADF contingent was located at Gir-i-Pit, approximately 30 km north of Dahak in northern Iraq. Four medical teams of five personnel each were deployed, each consisting of a medical officer, nursing officer and three medical assistants. Each team had an interpreter attached. A dental team, preventative health team, engineering section and headquarters/administration support group were also deployed. Personnel were sourced primarily from the 2nd Field Ambulance of the Operational Deployment Force (the 3rd Brigade) in Townsville and from various units in the ADF including members from the 1st Health Support Battalion (1HSB).

ADF medical teams operated in an area approximately 500 km^{2}. While one medical team remained at base, the other three medical teams would travel approximately 200 km and treat 60–100 patients each day. More than 3,000 patients were seen by the ADF medical teams, with over 80% of those being paediatric. The common conditions treated included diarrhoea, dehydration, malnutrition, scabies, respiratory tract infections, malaria, typhoid fever, anaemia, and a range of chronic diseases. Fragmentation injuries were also seen due to the vast number of land mines and unexploded ammunition littered across the countryside.

According to Little and Hodge, by the time the ADF personnel had completed Operation Habitat on 30 June 1991, life for the Kurdish people was returning to normal and health in the region was rapidly improving. Kurds were returning to their farms, rebuilding their villages and the children were going back to school.
