= Battle Force Zulu =

Battle Force Zulu is the code-name designation for the following U.S. Navy task forces:

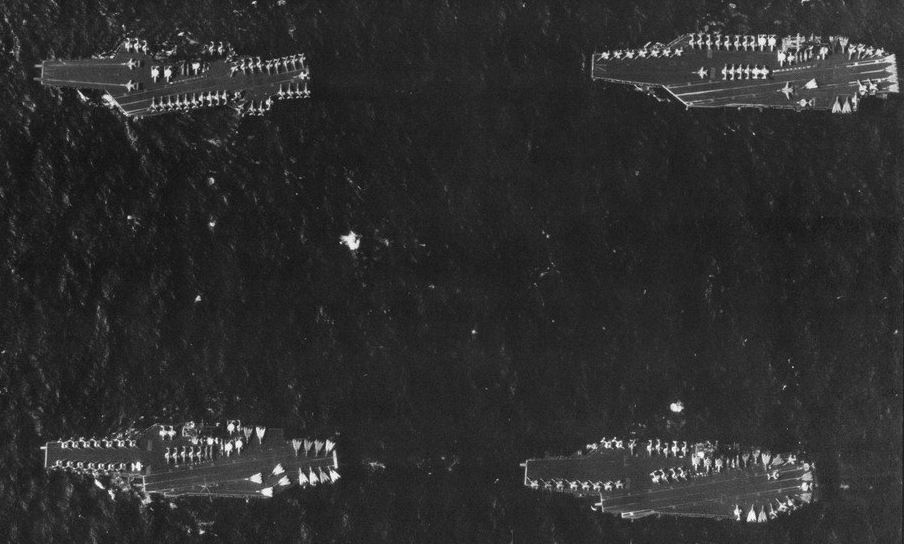
Battle Force Zulu - 1991 Gulf War

- Task Force 60 during 1986's Operation El Dorado Canyon, Operation Prairie Fire, and Attain Document series of freedom of navigation (FON) naval maneuvers in the Gulf of Sidra
- Task Force 154, the carrier battle force that operated in the Persian Gulf during 1991's Operation Desert Storm (pictured)

== See also ==
- Task Force Zulu
