= Australia in the Iraq War =

A Long Range Patrol Vehicle-mounted SASR patrol in western Iraq

Australia joined a U.S.-led coalition in the Iraq War. Declassified documents reveal that the decision to go to war was taken primarily with a view to enhancing its alliance with the United States.

The Howard government supported the disarmament of Iraq during the Iraq disarmament crisis. Australia later provided one of the four most substantial combat force contingents during the 2003 invasion of Iraq, under the operational codename Operation Falconer. Part of its contingent were among the first forces to enter Iraq after the official "execute" order. The initial Australian force consisted of three Royal Australian Navy ships, a 500-strong special forces task group, two AP-3C Orion maritime patrol aircraft, two B707 Air-to-Air refuelling aircraft, C-130 Hercules transport aircraft and No. 75 Squadron RAAF (which included 14 F/A-18 Hornet fighters). Combat forces committed to Operation Falconer for the 2003 Invasion were withdrawn during 2003. Under the name Operation Catalyst, Australian combat troops were redeployed to Iraq in 2005, and assumed responsibility for supporting Iraqi security forces in one of Iraq's southern provinces. These troops began withdrawing from Iraq on 1 June 2008 and were completely withdrawn by 28 July 2009.

== Forces committed ==
F/A-18A aircraft and ground crew from No. 75 Squadron.

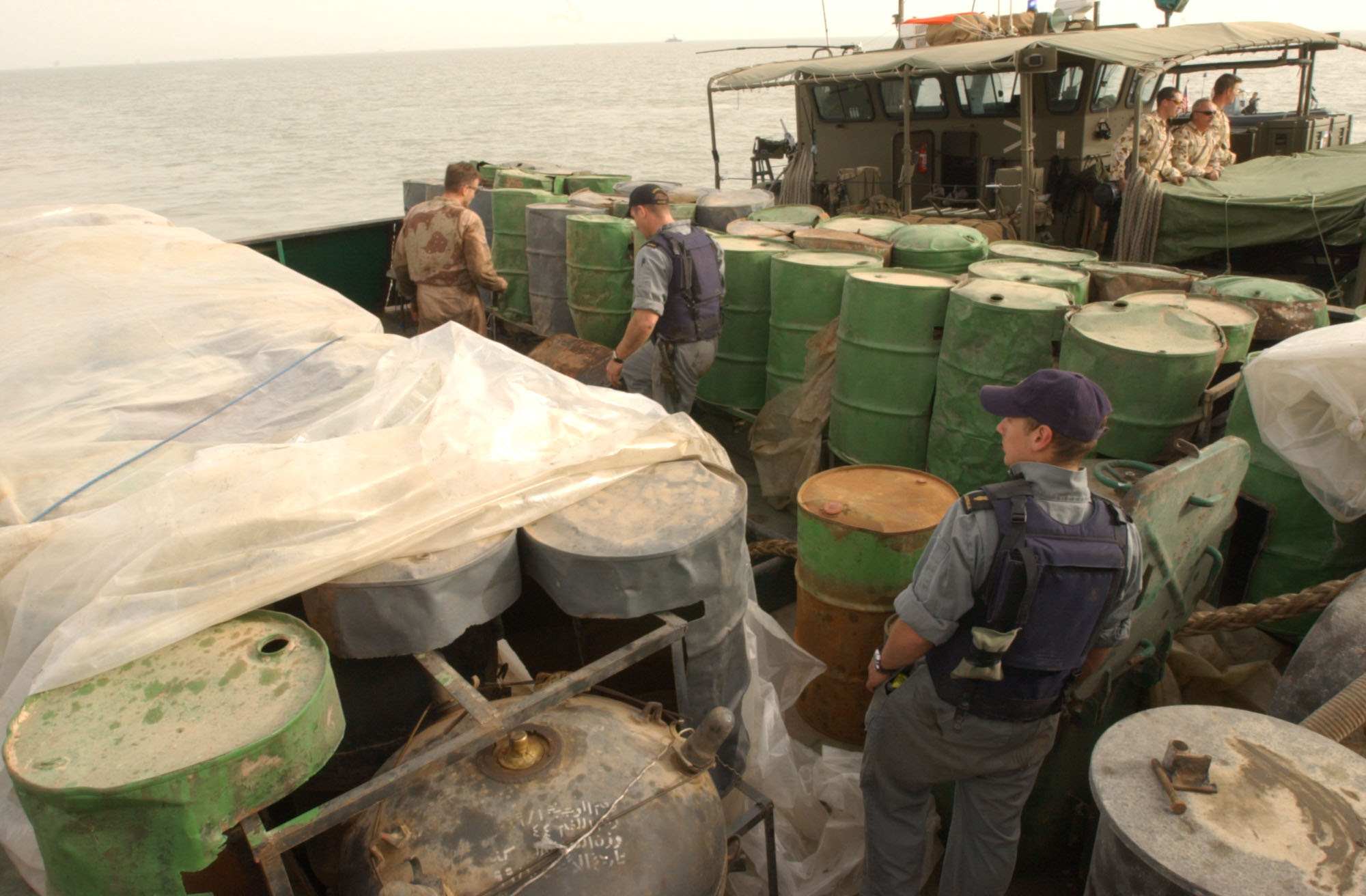
Members of Clearance Diving Team Three and an Army LCM-8 inspecting camouflaged mines, 21 March 2003.

A headquarters staff of about 60 personnel under the command of Brigadier Maurie McNarn.

- Royal Australian Navy
  - Task Group Commander with 16 person staff. He served as the Coalition Maritime Interception Operations Screen Commander.
  - The frigates HMAS Anzac and HMAS Darwin, which were already on-station as part of the Multinational Interception Force enforcing economic sanctions against Iraq before the invasion plan was entered into. Each ship carried a single Seahawk helicopter from 816 Squadron RAN.
  - The transport ship HMAS Kanimbla carrying 350 crew and soldiers, including embarked Australian Army LCM-8 landing craft and an anti-aircraft contingent, a Sea King helicopter from 817 Squadron RAN, and a bomb disposal team. A detachment from the Army's 16th Air Defence Regiment provided point defence to the Kanimbla.
  - Clearance Diving Team Three, which worked alongside divers from several nations to clear Iraqi ports of mines.
- Royal Australian Air Force
  - No. 75 Squadron, operating 14 F/A-18 Hornet fighter jets together with 250 command, coordination, support and aircrew personnel.
  - Three C-130H Hercules transport aircraft from No. 36 Squadron RAAF and 150 support personnel.
  - Two AP-3C Orion maritime patrol aircraft and 150 support personnel (these aircraft may have operated in the electronic intelligence gathering role).
- Australian Army
  - A 500-strong special forces task group consisting of:
    - Forward Command Element
    - Special Forces Task Group attached to Combined Joint Special Operations Task Force-West (CJSOTF-W)
      - 1st Squadron Group, Australian Special Air Service Regiment
      - Platoon (+), 4th Battalion, Royal Australian Regiment (Commando)
      - D Troop, Incident Response Regiment
      - Combat Service Support Group
    - Troop, C Squadron, 5th Aviation Regiment (3 CH-47 Chinook)
    - 2 LCM-8 Landing Craft, 70/71 Troop Water Transport Squadron

== Operations by Australian Forces ==
Planning for the deployment of ADF units to the Middle East began in mid-2002 when Australian officers were attached to United States planning teams. This was before the Government's announcement that Australia would join the United States and British buildup, but was conducted as contingency planning which did not imply a commitment to war.

In keeping with its relatively small size, the Australian force made an important though limited contribution to Coalition operations during the invasion of Iraq. The Australian contribution was also geographically dispersed, with the Australian forces forming part of larger US and British units rather than a concentrated Australian unit. No Australian personnel were killed or taken prisoner during the war.

Brigadier Maurie McNarn on 21 March 2003, was the first Coalition commander to hold an official press conference with the international media in Qatar. Australian contributions at the time were widely quoted owing to the lack of official operational news from other participants.

=== Maritime operations ===
HMAS Anzac firing on Iraqi positions and troop concentrations in Um-Qasr, 2003

Before the outbreak of war, Australian naval forces in the Persian Gulf continued to enforce the sanctions against Iraq. These operations were conducted by boarding parties from the RAN warships and AP-3 Orion patrol aircraft.

Upon the outbreak of war the RAN's focus shifted to supporting the coalition land forces and clearing the approaches to Iraqi ports. HMAS Anzac provided gunfire support to Royal Marines during fighting on the Al-Faw Peninsula and the Clearance Diving Team took part in clearing the approaches to Umm Qasr. Boarding operations continued during the war, and on 20 March boarding parties from HMAS Kanimbla seized an Iraqi ship carrying 86 naval mines. Army LCM-8 Landing Craft were used as forward deployment and support platforms for the Navy boarding parties and were the first regular Maritime assets to the port of Umm Qasr, moving as far north as Basara on the inland waterways collecting intelligence for allied forces. LCM-8 Assets were utilised by British and American forces for various cargo transportation duties during the course of the war.

=== Special forces operations ===
The primary role of the Special Forces Task Group was to secure an area of western Iraq from which it was feared that SCUD missiles could be launched. The SAS successfully entered Iraq by vehicle and United States helicopters and secured their area of responsibility after a week of fighting. Following this the SAS patrolled the highways in the area in order to block the escape of members of the Iraqi government and to prevent enemy foreign fighters from entering the country.

On 11 April the SAS Squadron was concentrated to capture the Al Asad Airbase. While this base proved to be almost undefended, the Australian troops captured over 50 MiG jets and more than 7.9 million kilograms of explosives. After securing the air base the SAS were reinforced by 4 RAR and the IRR elements. The Special Forces Task Group remained at Al Asad until the end of the war, when most of the SAS Squadron and IRR Troop returned home and the 4 RAR platoon (reinforced by elements of the SAS) was deployed to Baghdad to protect Australian diplomats.

=== Air operations ===
No. 75 Squadron's initial role was to escort high-value Coalition aircraft such as tankers and AWACS aircraft. As it became clear that the Iraqi Air Force posed no threat, the role of No. 75 Squadron shifted to providing close air support to Coalition ground forces and air interdiction against Iraqi forces. These missions were initially flown in support of the US Army but the Squadron later switched to supporting the US Marines. As organized Baathist resistance crumbled, the F/A-18s were increasingly tasked to provide 'shows of force' to encourage Iraqi forces to surrender. During the war No. 75 Squadron flew a total of 350 sorties and dropped 122 laser-guided bombs.

Reports indicate that the No. 75 Squadron's activities were somewhat restricted in their military role compared to similarly equipped US forces. Australian aircraft were not permitted to operate in the "Baghdad SuperMEZ" (Missile Exclusion Zone) because of fears that the Hornet's electronic warfare systems were inadequate, though the report indicates that they were identical to American Hornets operating in this area. Furthermore, they were not permitted to conduct close air support missions in urban areas because of fears of collateral damage. These restrictions were in line with the rules of engagement set by the Australian Government, which were reportedly more restrictive than the rules governing the conduct of British and American forces.

The Australian C-130 transports and CH-47 helicopters provided airlift to Coalition forces, including the Australian Special Forces Task Group.

== Post-invasion operations – Operation Catalyst ==
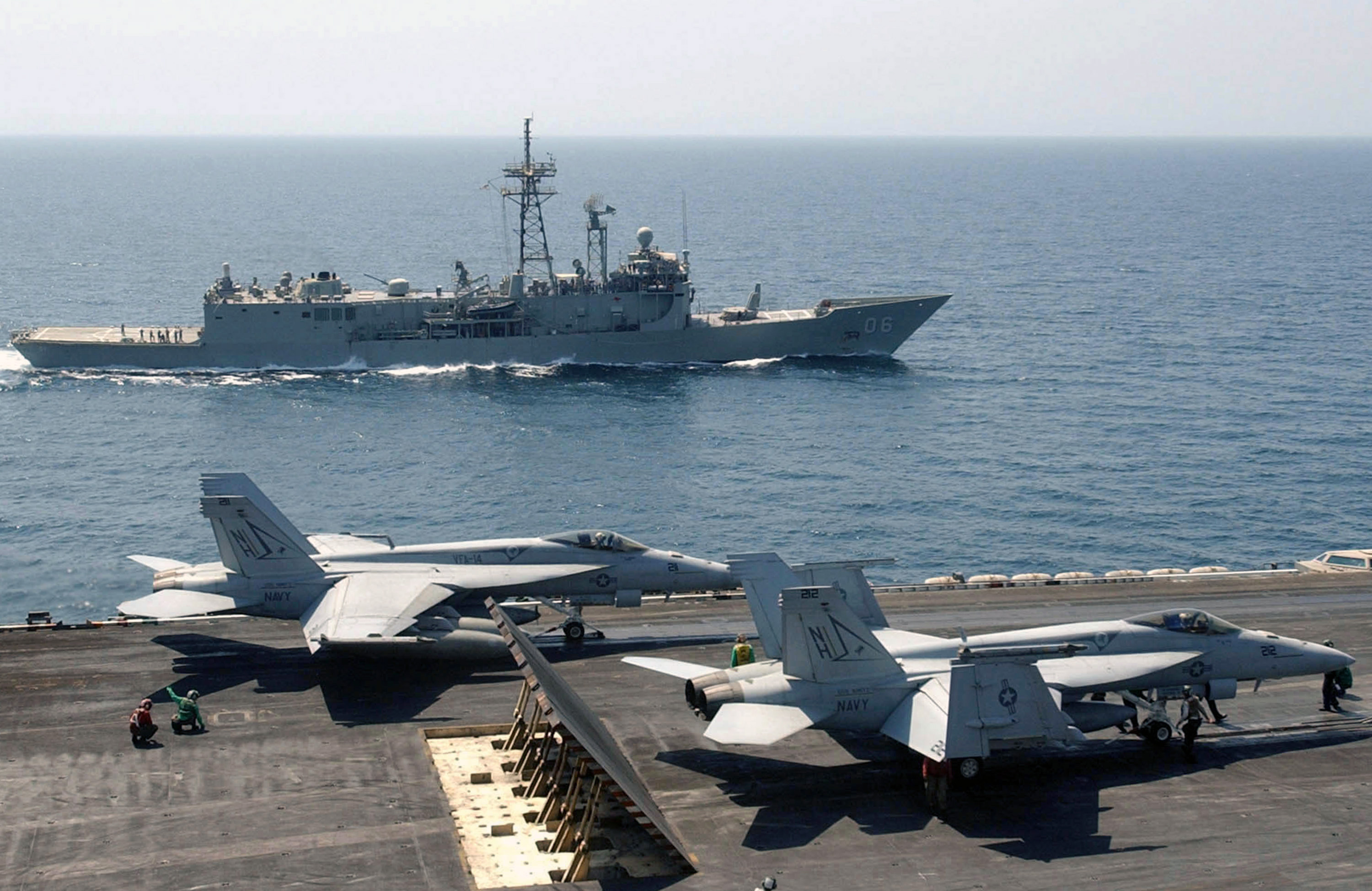
HMAS Newcastle alongside USS Nimitz in the Persian Gulf in September 2005.

An Al Muthanna Task Group patrol in 2005.

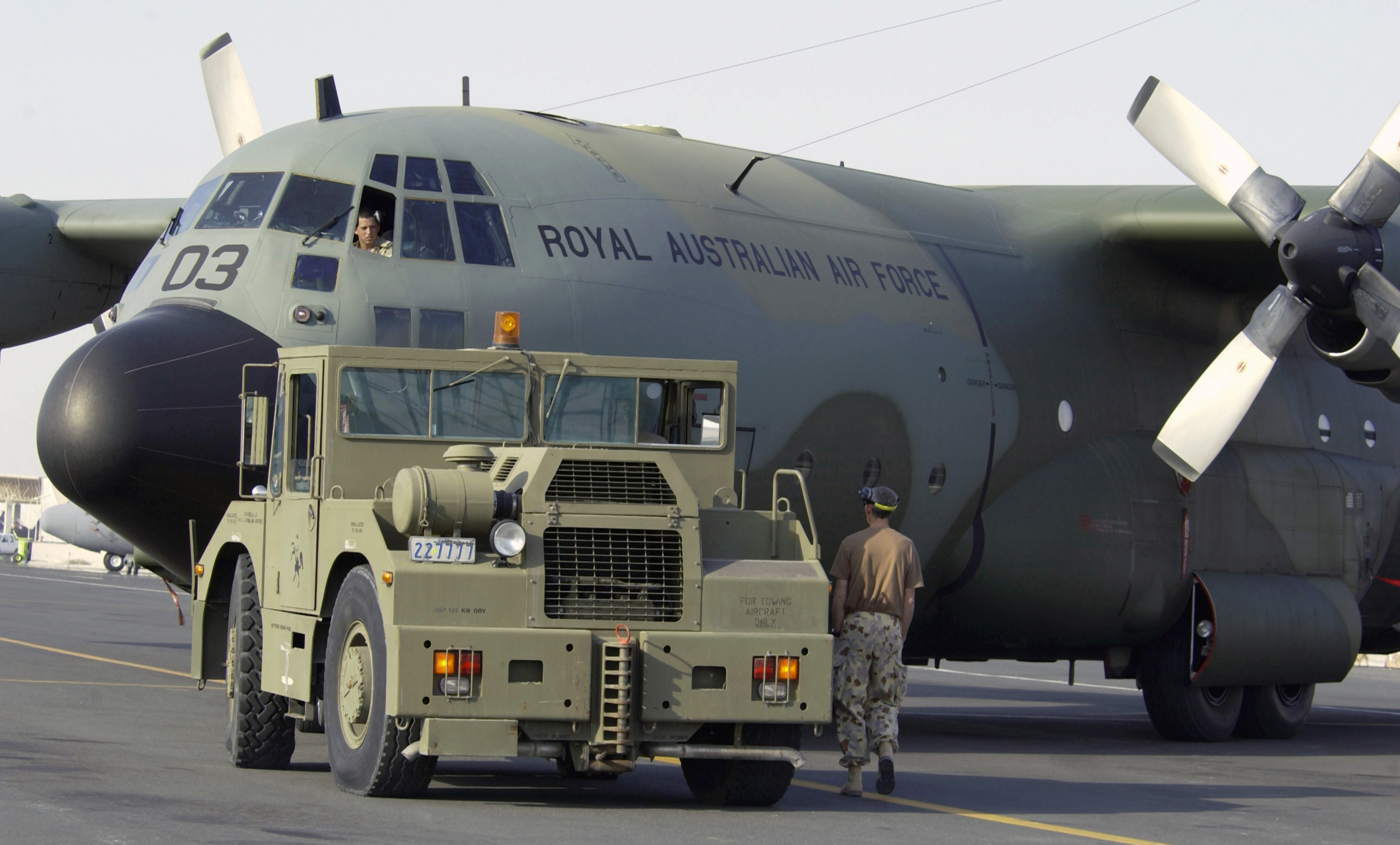
A No. 36 Squadron C-130 Hercules at a Middle Eastern air base in December 2003

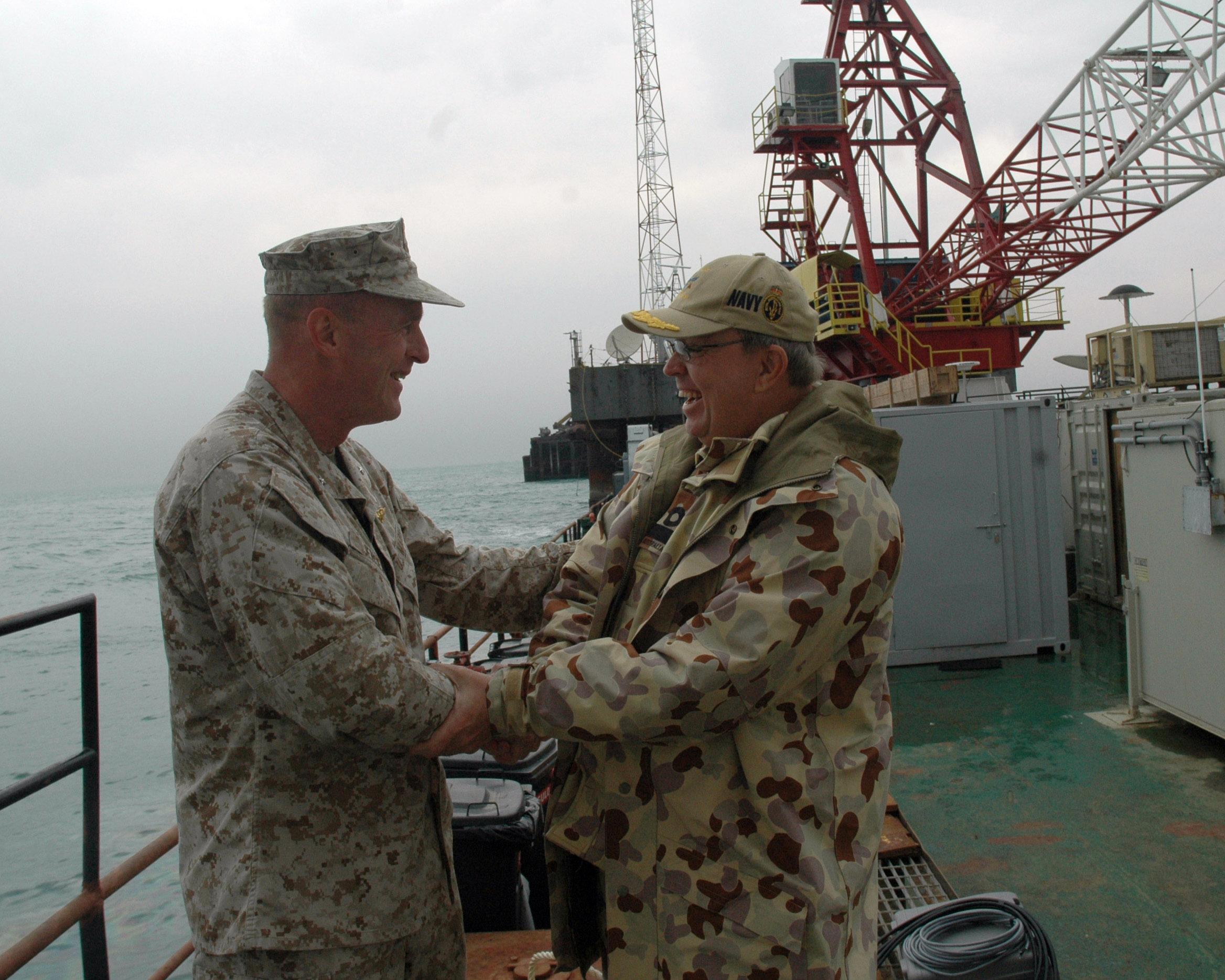
Commodore Peter Lockwood DSC, CSC (right) turning command of Combined Task Force 158 over to U.S. Marine Brig. Gen. Carl Jensen

Following the capture of Baghdad Australian C-130 aircraft flew humanitarian supplies into the city. Almost all the forces deployed for the war returned to Australia shortly after the end of major fighting.

Unlike the three other countries which contributed combat forces to the war, Australia did not immediately contribute military forces to the post-war reconstruction of Iraq. Following victory, the Australian force in Iraq was limited to specialists attached to the Coalition headquarters in Baghdad and the search for Iraq's suspected weapons of mass destruction, a frigate in the Persian Gulf, a party of air traffic controllers at Baghdad International Airport, two C-130 Hercules transport aircraft, two AP-3C Orion aircraft and small Security Detachment (SECDET) consisting of infantry, Armoured and support elements with the Military Police Close Protection Team protecting the Australian military units and diplomats based in Baghdad. This force was later expanded to include an Army training detachment and a small medical detachment attached to a US Air Force hospital. The Royal Australian Navy has also assumed command of coalition forces in the Persian Gulf on two occasions; Combined Task Force 58 in 2005 and Combined Task Force 158 in 2006.

The Australian Government refused requests made during 2003 and 2004 by the United States and United Nations to increase Australia's contribution to the Multinational force in Iraq. In 2004 the government argued that assistance it had provided to prepare a Fijian force for Iraq met its obligation to contribute to security arrangements for the January 2005 Iraqi parliamentary election. In February 2005, however, the Australian government announced that the Australian Army would deploy a battlegroup to Al Muthanna Province to provide security for the Japanese engineers deployed to the province as well as to help train Iraqi security forces. This force — approximately 500 strong and equipped with armoured vehicles including ASLAVs and Bushmasters – named the Al Muthanna Task Group, commenced operations in April 2005. Following the withdrawal of the Japanese force and the transition of Al Muthanna to Iraqi control the Australian battlegroup relocated to Tallil Air Base in neighbouring Dhi Qar province in July 2006. The name AMTG was subsequently abandoned in favour of the title Overwatch Battle Group (West), reflecting the unit's new role. Al Muthana and Dhi Qar are the westernmost of the four southern provinces and OBG(W) became the prime coalition intervention force in the western sector of the British Multi-National Division (South-East) (Iraq) (MND-SE) Area of Operations, with MND-SE based in the southern port city of Basrah. Responsibility for overwatch in Dhi Qar was subsequently assumed from the withdrawing Italian contingent in late October 2006, whilst OBG(W) continued to train Iraqi security forces. By late 2006 overall personnel numbers committed to Operation Catalyst (Iraq) had risen to 1400.

After the Labor Party achieved a landslide victory in the 2007 election, Prime Minister Kevin Rudd's government withdrew Australian combat forces began from Iraq on 1 June 2008 and the Overwatch Battle Group (West) and Australian Army Training Team formally ceased combat operations on 2 June 2008, having helped train 33,000 Iraqi soldiers. Approximately 200 Australian personnel will remain in Iraq on logistical and air surveillance duties. All personnel other than those in SECDET and two officers attached to the United Nations will be withdrawn in July 2009.

== Casualties ==
No Australian military personnel were killed in direct combat action during Operation Falconer or Operation Catalyst. One Australian soldier died in 2015 as a direct result of injuries sustained in an IED blast in 2004, three died in accidents or during service with British forces; many more have been wounded. Additionally as many as six Australians have been killed whilst working as private security contractors.

Matthew Millhouse, 36, was a trooper serving in the 2nd Cavalry Regiment, when the ASLAV he was driving was struck by a VBIED on the 25th of October 2004. He was knocked unconscious, but awoke and ran to the aid of LT Garth Callender who was severely injured. LT Callander later recovered from his physical wounds, but as a result of the blast TPR Millhouse was diagnosed with younger-onset dementia which claimed his life on 28 August 2015. He has since been listed on the Australian War Memorial Honour Roll as a casualty of the Iraq War.

Paul Pardoel, 35, was a flight lieutenant serving as a navigator in the RAF. He died when his C-130 Hercules from No 47 Squadron crashed in Iraq on 30 January 2005 killing all ten crew aboard. He was an Australian citizen serving in the British Armed Forces, having transferred from the RAAF in 2002. He was originally from Victoria.

David Nary, 42, was a warrant officer with the Australian Special Air Service Regiment. He was killed on 5 November 2005 after being struck by a vehicle during a training exercise in Kuwait prior to deployment to Iraq and Afghanistan.

Jake Kovco, 25, was a private serving in the 3rd Battalion, Royal Australian Regiment (3 RAR). He was part of the security detachment (SECDET) in Baghdad when he was killed on 21 April 2006 from a gunshot wound to the head that was believed to have been accidentally self-inflicted.

== Australian contribution in context ==
=== Scale of the Australian force commitment ===
The Australian military contribution was relatively small in proportional terms, around 2,000 personnel in total, or 2.42% of its military compared to the United States 4.85% and the United Kingdom's 12%.

With one obvious exception, the particular forces committed by the Australian Government can be seen by some as modest and to follow past practice closely. Australia committed special forces to the US-led invasion of Afghanistan in roughly similar numbers to those above. The two RAN frigates were already on-station for the Afghanistan campaign; Kanimbla was a relatively small addition to the naval force. RAN clearance divers also took part in the Gulf War.

Australia sent Hercules and Orion aircraft to assist in the Afghanistan campaign—but also Boeing 707 tankers, which had not been committed to the Gulf War, despite a marked Coalition shortage of probe/drogue capable tanker aircraft. The absence of the 707s was likely caused by technical rather than policy reasons: the RAAF has only four second-hand 707 tankers; all are at the end of their service lives, very difficult to maintain and soon to be replaced.

The commitment of No. 75 Squadron and its supporting personnel, however, was a major change from past practice. Australia did not commit combat aircraft to the 1991 Gulf War, and although a small detachment of Hornets was deployed to Diego Garcia during the Afghanistan campaign to provide airfield defence for the joint United States-United Kingdom military facility present there, this was not a true combat role, however, but simply a precaution against possible suicide attacks by hijacked civil aircraft. The commitment of No. 75 Squadron was the first combat deployment of Australian aircraft since the Vietnam War.

No official statement has been made on the reasons behind the choice of F/A-18 fighters as Australia's primary combat commitment, but it is commonly assumed that the obvious alternative of sending a substantial land force instead was considered to involve an unacceptably high risk of casualties, particularly given the possibility of house-to-house fighting in Iraqi cities. Iraq is largely landlocked, and Australia no longer has a fixed-wing naval aviation component; thus, a larger naval commitment could not be considered particularly helpful. The choice of the F/A-18 deployment rather than of the F-111 tactical bomber may have been due to the higher cost of operation of the F-111, and its use being limited to more politically contentious ground attack missions rather than more uncontentious tasks like combat air patrols.

=== Financial costs ===
The cost of the Iraq war to Australian taxpayers is estimated to have exceeded A$5 billion. The cost of Australia's involvement in Iraq has risen since the initial invasion gave way to a protracted insurgency. Excluding debt relief, the annual cost has risen from just over $400 million in 2003–04 to $576.6 million in the 2007 financial year. Ancillary costs included:

- $494.5 million in the base wage and personnel costs for Australian Defence Force troops deployed in Iraq not included in the net additional spending figures;
- $211.5 million spent by Foreign Affairs and other departments on aid, reconstruction, Australia's diplomatic presence in Baghdad and tax concessions for soldiers; and
- $668 million in Iraqi debts waived by Australia.
