= 2026 National Defence Strategy =

Australian 2026 defence plan

- The Boeing MQ-28 Ghost Bat was a major part of the National Defence Strategy and co-published Integrated Investment Program
- Presented: 16 April 2026
- Commissioned by: Minister for Defence Richard Marles; Minister for Defence Industry Pat Conroy
- Subject: Australian Defence Force; Australian Army; Royal Australian Air Force; Royal Australian Navy
- Supersedes: 2024 National Defence Strategy; 2023 Defence Strategic Review

The 2026 National Defence Strategy is an Australian Department of Defence white paper published in April 2026 and commissioned by the Albanese government that details future plans for the Australian Defence Force, building on the 2023 Defence Strategic Review and the 2024 National Defence Strategy.

Co-published alongside the 2026 Integrated Investment Program, the white paper outlines increased defence spending, aiming to reach 3% of GDP by 2033 using the NATO definition, new acquisition priorities, furthering deterrence by denial as Australia's military strategy, long-range strike, ballistic missile defence and drone warfare programs.

== Background ==
In 2023, the government commissioned the 2023 Defence Strategic Review, an independent review which made recommendations to government regarding improvements for defence posture, basing, acquisition priorities, and a more domestic-focused defence industry. This review also lead to a further Australian Surface Fleet Review, focusing on the future of the Royal Australian Navy. This report emphasised building the largest Australian surface fleet since World War II, making the following major recommendations:

- Upgrading the Hobart-class destroyers to Aegis Baseline 9, enabling ballistic missile defence;
- Cutting back the Hunter-class heavy frigate program from 9 to 6 ships;
- Acquiring 11 general purpose frigates
- Acquiring 6 large optionally-crewed arsenal vessels.

As of 2026, the first Hunter-class frigate, HMAS Hunter, has begun construction, and the general-purpose frigate program was awarded to Japanese companies to produce the New FFM.

The 2024 National Defence Strategy focused on an integrated force, international alliances, deterrence by denial, and increasing the capability of Australia's northern bases.

The 2026 strategy was also influenced by the Russo-Ukrainian war, the Middle Eastern crisis including the 2026 Iran war and a militarily-rising China.

== Acquisition ==
=== Australian Army ===
==== Ground-launched ballistic missiles ====
Australia is a partner in the Precision Strike Missile (PrSM) program alongside the United States. The PrSM is a family of short- and medium-range ballistic missiles which are ground-launched through the M142 HIMARS. PrSM variants are referred to as increments:

- Increment I - a 500-km class missile used to strike stationary targets. Australia has been shown to possess this variant and it has been used in the 2026 Iran war. The United States has expended their entire stockpile of this missile and are awaiting further delivery.
- Increment II (Land-Based Anti-Ship Missile) - a 1000-km class missile that has the ability to strike moving naval targets. In testing.
- Increment III - a 1000-km class missile that expands the range of payloads from previous variants. To be produced after variants I, II and IIII.
- Increment IV - an extended-range class of more than 1,000 km range using advanced propulsion.
- Increment V - a future variant that can be launched from autonomous vehicles.

Australia intends to procure all variants, and produce them locally. It is also implied that the ADF intends to progressively expand stockpiles of the missiles. In 2025, Australia also expanded its order of HIMARS systems, to a total of 90 launchers, which would make Australia the second-largest international customer behind Poland.

=== Royal Australian Air Force ===
==== Air Defence ====
The review prioritised the acquisition of a medium-range ground-based air defence system capable of targeting high-speed ballistic missiles targeting defence infrastructure, facilities or bases. Through an accelerated AIR6502 Phase I, the program will develop a middle-tier of a future Integrated Air and Missile Defence system. Australia will also explore opportunities to acquire further air defence in the short-term.

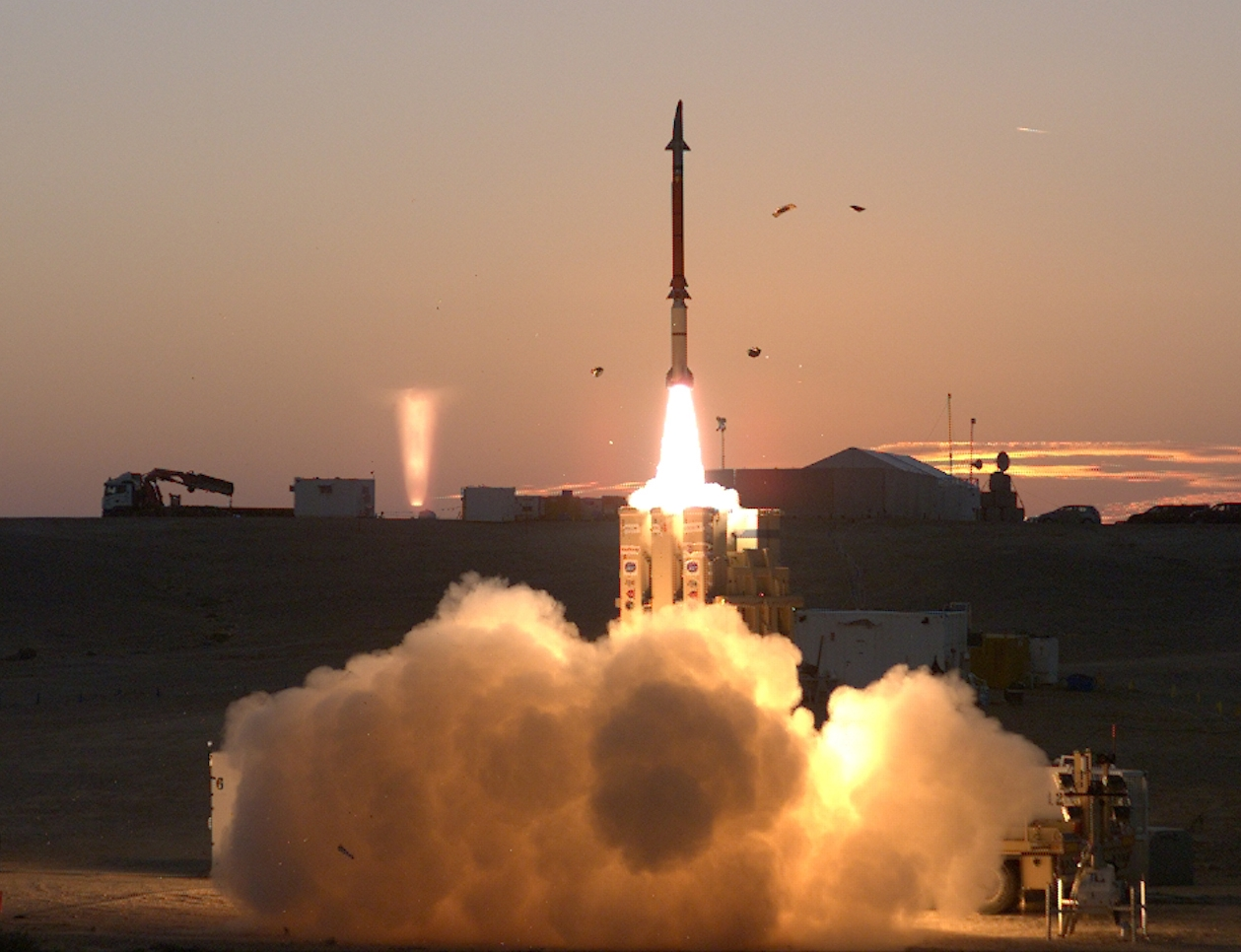
David's Sling interceptor systems have been proposed for Australia's MRGBAD requirement

In 2023, Israel Aerospace Industries put forward a bid for the program for the Barak MX system. Raytheon and Rafael Advanced Defense Systems intend to bid the SkyCeptor system, which is the same missile used for Israel's David's Sling air defence system.

==== Munitions ====
In order to expand the range at which the Royal Australian Air Force (RAAF) can persecute naval targets, the RAAF plans to integrate the AGM-158C LRASM stealth anti-ship missile onto the Boeing F/A-18F Super Hornet, Boeing P-8A Poseidon and Lockheed Martin F-35A Lightning II aircraft. To increase capability to strike radar systems, the RAAF will integrate the AARGM-ER missile onto Boeing EA-18G Growler and F-35A Lightning II aircraft. The AGM-158 JASSM will be integrated onto the F/A-18F Super Hornet and the F-35A Lightning II to increase the RAAF's ability to persecute land targets. The Joint Strike Missile will be integrated onto the F-35A Lightning II and hypersonic weapons such as the Hypersonic Attack Cruise Missile will be accelerated and integrated onto the F/A-18F Super Hornet.

== Strategy ==
=== Military budget ===
As a result of the 2026 National Defence Strategy, Australia will increase its defence spending to 3% of gross domestic product by 2033, including an extra A$14bn over the next 4 years and A$53bn over the next decade. The spending will rise to approximately A$63.4bn in 2026, to $112bn in 2035.

ABC Projection of defence spending to priority areas to 2036
Priority Area	Spending
Undersea warfare	A$130bn
Maritime capabilities	A$77bn
Amphibious warfare	A$59bn
Long-range missile forces	A$35bn
Expeditionary air operations	A$41bn
Space warfare and cyberwarfare	A$38bn
Guided Weapons and Explosive Ordnance	A$36bn
Missile defence	A$30bn
Theatre logistics and health	A$21bn
Theatre Command and Control	A$19bn
Northern Bases	A$16bn
Uncrewed and autonomous systems	A$15bn
Advanced Strategic Capabilities Accelerator	A$4.3bn

=== Military strategy ===
The 2026 National Defence Strategy furthers Australia's adopted military strategy of detterence through denial. The cornerstone of this strategy is the Australian Defence Force being able to use its systems to deter an adversary from attacking due to it being to costly, difficult or unlikely to succeed.
