= Australian Surface Fleet Review =

Australian Government program to outline the future of the Navy

Surface Fleet Review Enhanced Lethality Surface Combatant Review
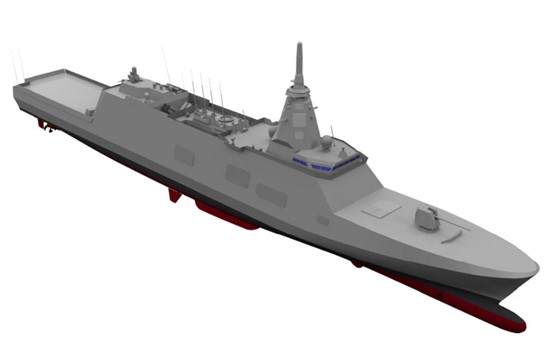
- New FFM – the frigate chosen for the general purpose frigate program
- Presented: 20 February 2024
- Commissioned by: Albanese government
- Signatories: Richard Marles; Pat Conroy
- Subject: Royal Australian Navy
- Purpose: To determine the future of the Royal Australian Navy surface fleet

The Enhanced Lethality Surface Combatant Review (or the Surface Fleet Review) was a 2024 independent review of the surface fleet of the Royal Australian Navy (RAN), that was authorised as a result of the larger Defence Strategic Review. It considered and recommended actions the RAN needed to take to solidify Australia's war-fighting capabilities on the maritime front. The review aims to counteract China and 'Chinese coercion' in the region. It was announced by Deputy Prime Minister and Minister for Defence Richard Marles and Minister for Defence Industry Pat Conroy on 20 February 2024.

Upon governmental approval, the review established several programs, including a General Purpose Frigate Program, an optionally-crewed arsenal ship program, as well as various programs to improve the capability of existing ship classes. These programs were divided into three tiers, each corresponding to different levels of ship capability. The review also focused on shipbuilding programs and infrastructure, and on the procurement of missiles.

== Background ==
The Surface Fleet Review, as well as the Defence Strategic Review, aim to counteract the increasing military power of a belligerent China. This coupled with the major focus and prioritisation of the Australian Army over other branches has created a ground for focus on the neglected Royal Australian Navy. In 2019, the Chinese People's Liberation Army Navy had a fleet of 335 ships, 55% larger than in 2005. Although Australia has a much smaller navy at 11 surface combatants, the SFR sets out a range of actions that Australia should take to increase the firepower and effectiveness of its naval assets. In 2021, Prime Minister Scott Morrison announced that Australia would cancel its contract with the French Naval Group for 12 Attack-class conventionally-powered submarines for the SSN-AUKUS nuclear-powered design in collaboration with the UK and US. France described the renegotiation as a 'stab in the back' ("poignarder dans le dos").

In response to the recommendations of the larger military-wide Defence Strategic Review, the Australian Government commissioned an "Independent Analysis into Navy's Surface Combatant Fleet" to consolidate and consider what changes should be made to make the naval fleet more lethal and efficient. The review was announced on 20 February 2024 by Defence Minister and Prime Minister, Richard Marles, alongside Minister for Defence Industry, Pat Conroy. Marles stated that the plans of the review would enable Australia to 'deter Chinese coercion' and maintain 'Australia['s] way of life'.

== Outcome and response ==
=== 'Tier 1' surface combatants ===
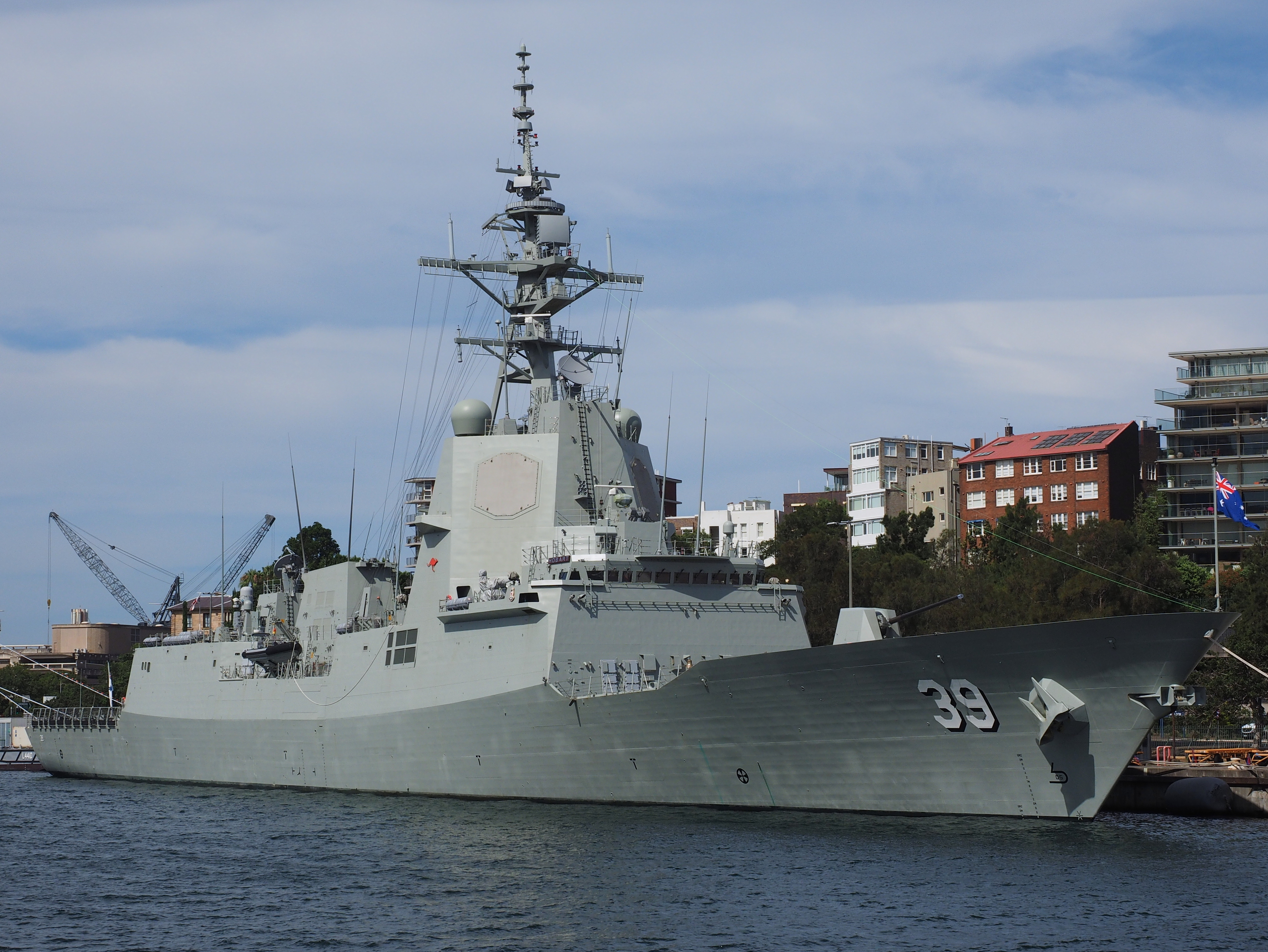
HMAS Hobart in 2017

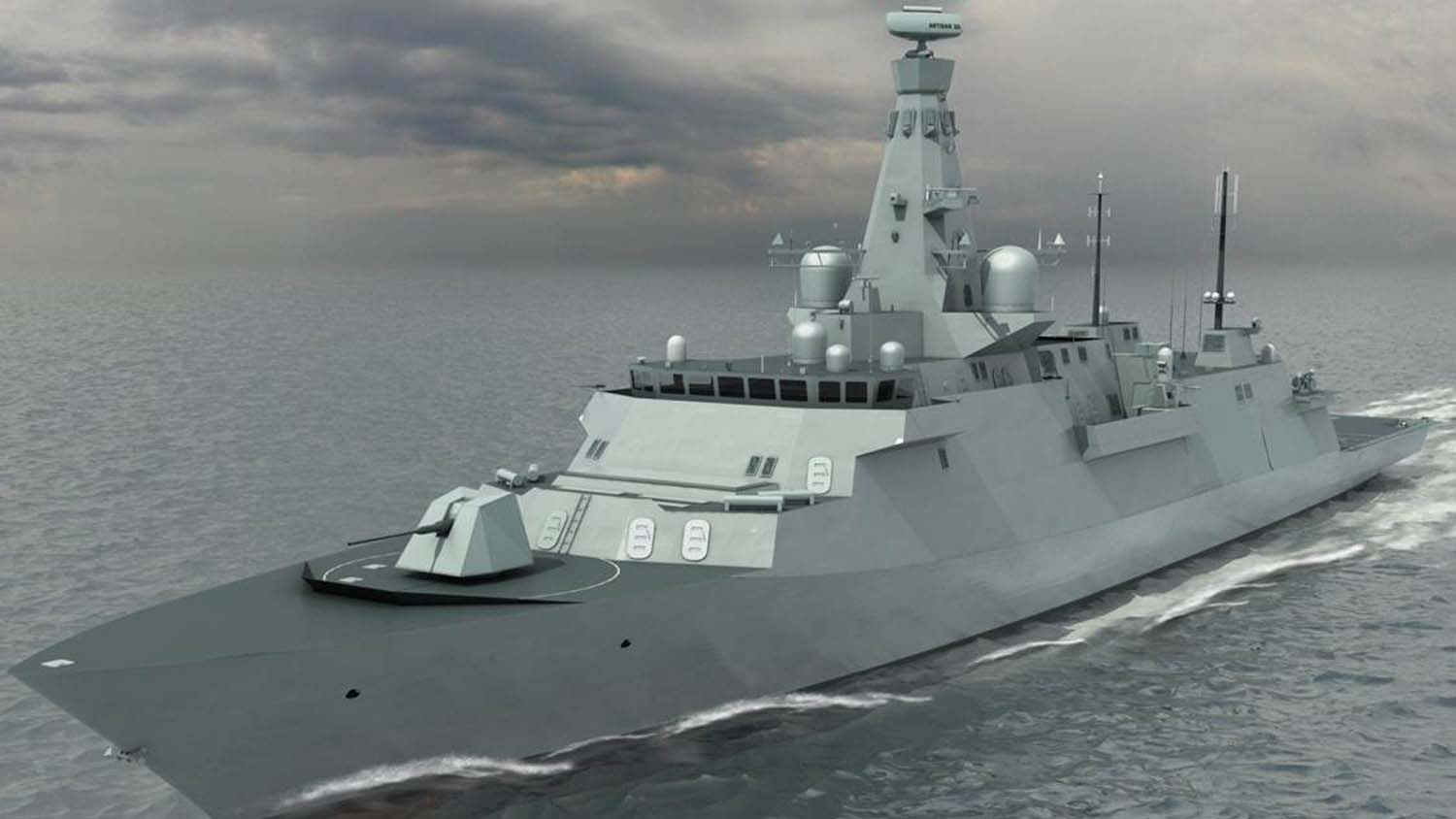
The Type 26 is the base platform of the Hunter-class

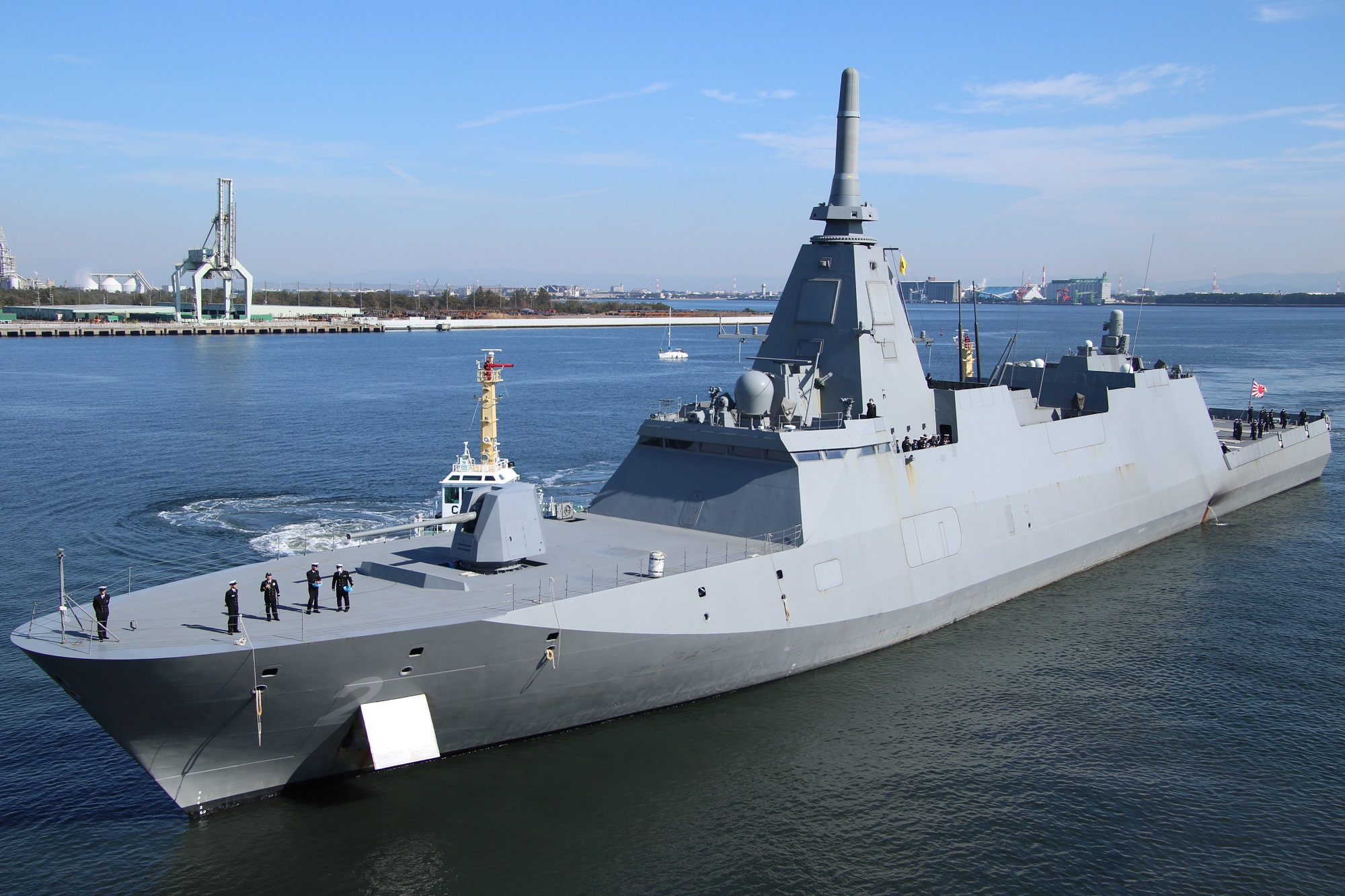
Mogami-class frigate, of which the New FFM (Upgraded Mogami) was chosen for the general purpose frigate program

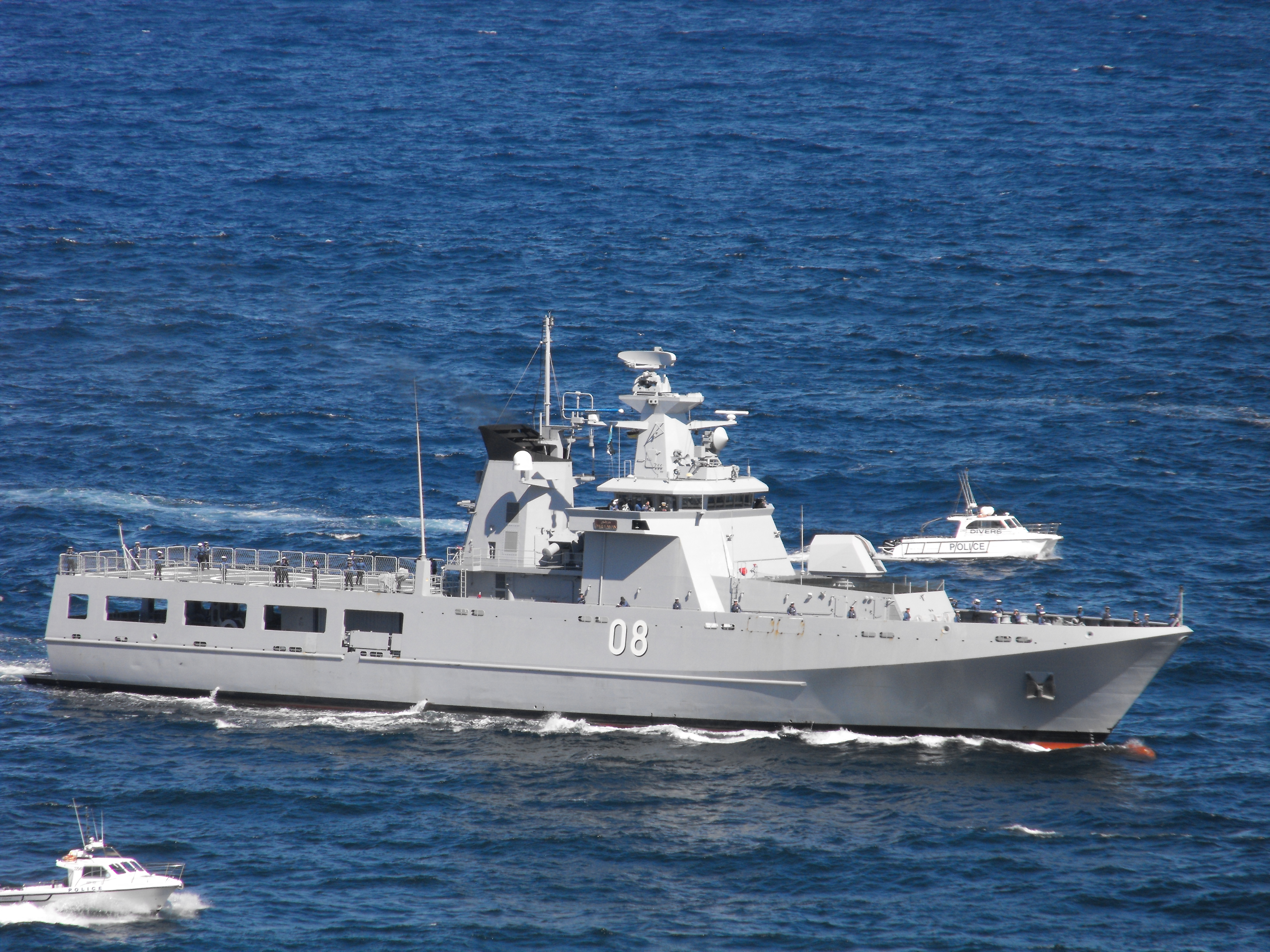
Base ship of the Arafura-class

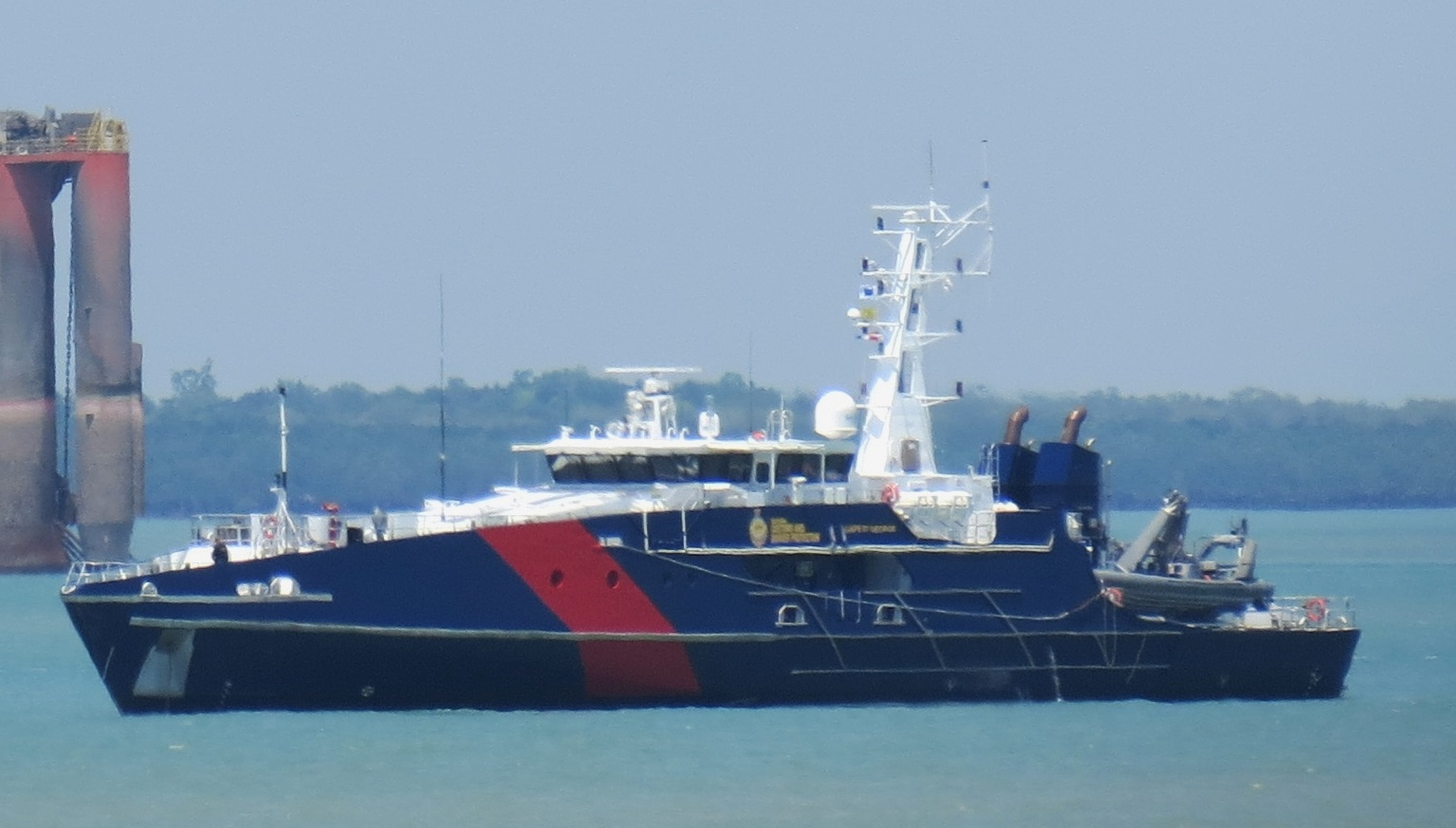
Cape-class vessel in Darwin Harbour, 2014

The government plans to upgrade the Tier 1 Hobart-class destroyers. The major upgrades include increasing the Aegis Combat System from Baseline 8 to 9 and possibly upgrading the radar system. The shipbuilders will also alter the missile cells so as to accommodate for more advanced missiles such as the Tomahawk, the Naval Strike Missile, and the SM-6 anti-ballistic missile.

As a result of the review, the Department of Defence (DoD) has agreed to make various concessions to the Hunter-class frigate program, the largest of which perhaps being the reduction of the total order of vessels, of which the DoD has announced their intent to slash the program to six vessels instead of the original nine that were planned. The DoD also followed the recommendation of the review to assess the feasibility of adapting the frigate to allow for the launching of the Tomahawk cruise missile.

=== 'Tier 2' surface combatants ===
In response to the aging nature of the current Anzac-class frigates of the RAN and in accordance with the recommendations of the review, the DoD has announced their intent to procure 11 'General Purpose Frigates (GPFs)'. They are intended to form part of a 'tier 2' fleet: less expensive than their 'tier 1' counterparts whilst still retaining adequate firepower, especially when it comes to Vertical launching system (VLS) cells. The GPFs will gradually replace the Anzac frigates as they come out of service, and the first batch is to be built in an accelerated manner overseas, and later transition to Henderson Naval Base for construction. The DoD has outlined four shortlisted ships to be considered for the program:

- German MEKO A-200, an upgraded design used for the Anzac-class frigates.
- Japanese New FFM (Upgraded Mogami) 06FFM stealth frigate.
- South Korean Daegu FFX or Chungnam FFX frigate.
- Spanish ALFA3000 corvette, the same design used before the review to advocate for a 'Tasman-class' corvette.

In November 2024, it was reported that the government had shortlisted the Japanese and German designs, with a final decision expected in 2025. In August 2025, the Japanese New FFM was selected.

The DoD has announced as a result of the review their program to acquire six large optionally-crewed surface vessels. The intended role of these vessels is to act as crewed arsenal ships; they will have 32 vertical-launch cells, but few close-in weapons. The DoD plans to purchase the ships from the United States contractors on their similar program, but to have them built in Australia. The 32 VLS cells on the ship will allow the system to act as a launch arena for anti-ballistic missiles such as SM-3 and RIM-174 Standard ERAM as well as land-strike missiles and anti-air munitions.

=== 'Tier 3' surface combatants ===
The review emphasised the belief that the Arafura-class is under-gunned and does not possess significant offensive or defensive capability, and as such, the DoD has agreed to reduce the amount of Arafura vessels from the planned twelve down to six vessels. They also agreed to investigate whether the vessels could be used in a specialised role, such as mine countermeasure.

The DoD has agreed to use the Cape-class primarily as an Australian Border Force vessel, as well as manufacture capability on a number of the vessels that would prove useful to the Navy. The government has also agreed to put in place a framework that would allow for all Cape-class vessels to be under the overall responsibility of the Department of Defence, yet maintenance would be funded by the appropriate organisation (ABF or Navy).

=== Shipbuilding ===
The review emphasised that the government of the day must commit to continuing Australia's domestic shipbuilding industry. As a result of this, the government made various concessions to accommodate this with projects divided across Australia's two naval manufacturing bases. These projects are:

- At the Osborne Naval Shipyard in South Australia;
  - Upgrading all Hobart-class destroyers;
  - Ensure all six Hunter-class frigates be built efficiently;
  - Life of Type Extension (LOTE) upgrades of Collins-class submarines;
  - Three replacement destroyers for the Hobart-class to be built following completion of the Hunter program;
- At the Australian Marine Complex in Western Australia;
  - Construct 8 out of the 11 General Purpose Frigates;
  - Build all of the six Large Optionally-Crewed Surface Vessels; and
  - Two additional Evolved Cape-class patrol boats.

South Australian Premier, Peter Malinauskas praised the government's allocation of shipbuilding programs to South Australia.

== Execution of the review ==
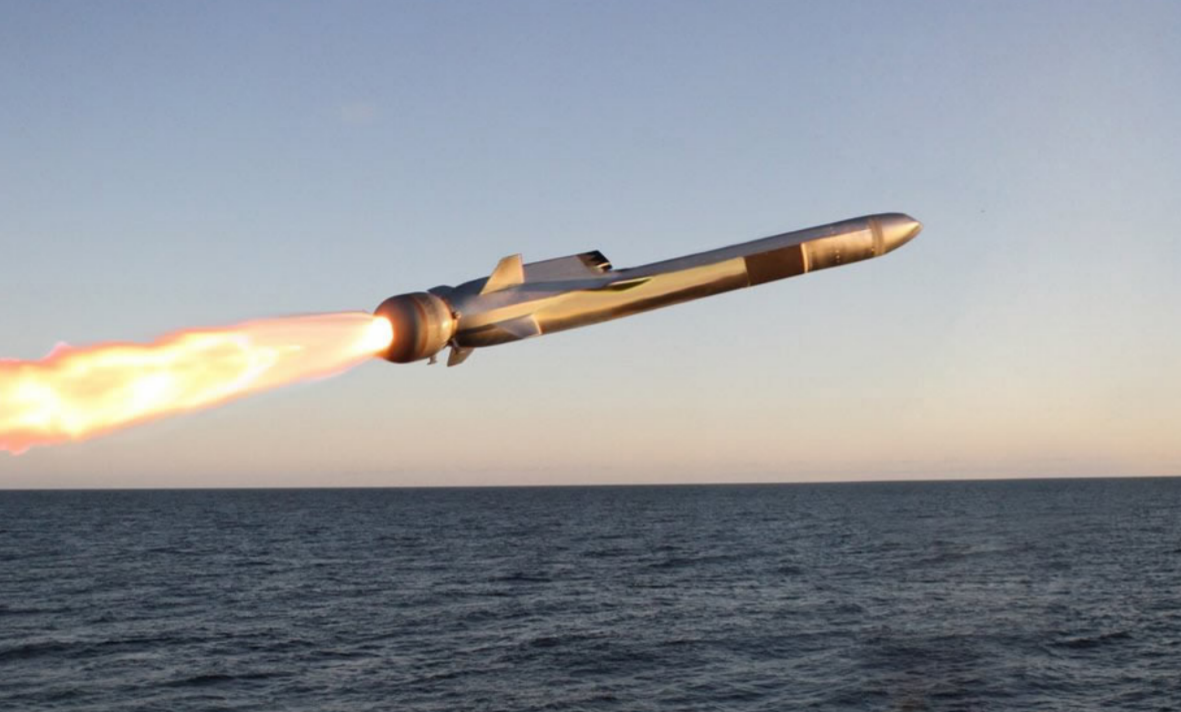
HMAS Sydney and HMAS Brisbane have been fitted with the Naval Strike Missile and the Tomahawk Land Attack Missile, respectively, in 2024.

=== 2024 ===
In May 2024, it was proven that the newest destroyer of the RAN, HMAS Sydney, was fitted with Naval Strike Missile launchers. According to the SIPRI arms transfers database, Australia placed an order for an unknown quantity of the Block-1A NSMs with delivery to begin in 2024. In July 2024, during Exercise RIMPAC, HMAS Sydney successfully fired its first NSM in the waters surrounding Hawaii. Sydney contributed to the SINKEX of the USS Tarawa with an NSM during RIMPAC 2024.

The first ship of the Hunter-class frigate program, HMAS Hunter, had its steel cut on 21 June 2024 and is expected to be launched in 2029-30, and commissioned in 2034.

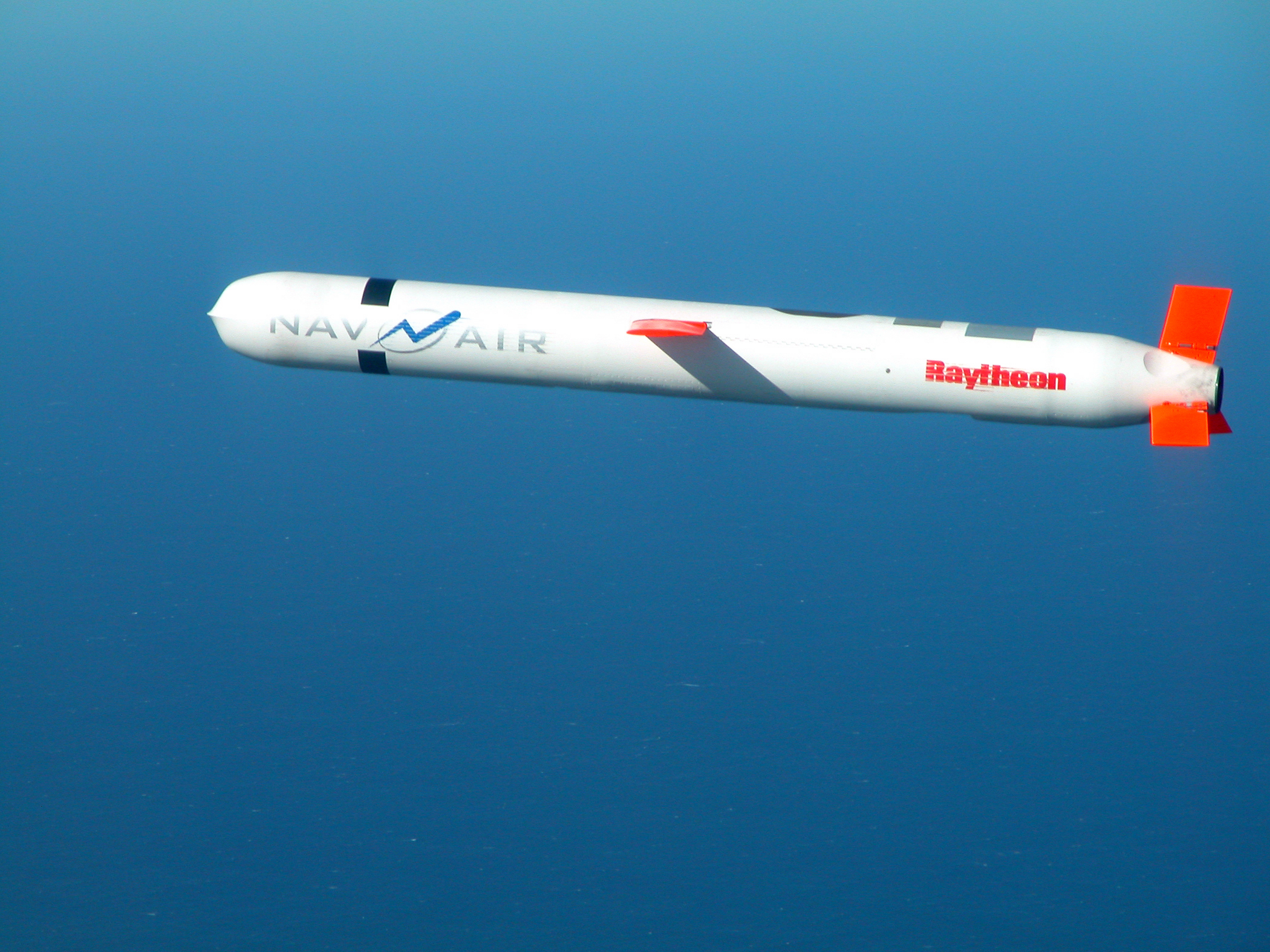

On 4 September 2024, Australia and Japan signed a deal to further collaborate on long-range missiles, especially for ship use. Australia agreed to allow Japan to use Australian missile testing ranges for Japanese experiments.

In November 2024, Australia announced its intention to purchase $7 billion worth of SM-2 and SM-6 missiles, both manufactured by Raytheon. SM-6 is a multipurpose sea-to-air missile, however its use in the RAN has been prioritised towards terminal ballistic missile defence.

In December 2024, for the first time Australia fired a Tomahawk cruise missile off the coast of the United States using the ship HMAS Brisbane, striking a test range in California successfully. According to the Department of Defence, the milestone testing of the Tomahawk missile extends Australia's strike missile capability to beyond 2,500km, much further than the previous range of 200km.

=== 2025 ===
On 5 August 2025, Defence Minister Richard Marles officially announced that the New FFM was selected as the general purpose frigate design.

== See also ==
- Future of the Royal Australian Navy
- Australian general purpose frigate program
- Australian large optionally-crewed surface vessel program
