= Large Unmanned Surface Vehicle =

Unmanned sea vessel

Class overview
- Operators: United States Navy
- Cost: $250 million
- Planned: 10

General characteristics
- Class & type: Fleet
- Type: Unmanned surface vehicle
- Displacement: 2,000 t (2,000 long tons; 2,200 short tons)
- Length: 300 ft (91 m)
- Range: 3,500 nmi (4,000 mi; 6,500 km)

The Large Unmanned Surface Vehicle (LUSV) or the Large Optionally-Crewed Surface Vessel (LOSV) in the Australian context is an unmanned surface vessel designed for the United States Navy and set to begin construction in 2020. Designed to be low-cost, high-endurance, reconfigurable ships based on commercial designs, they will have the capacity for modular payloads such as anti-ship, anti-submarine or anti-air weapons. Capable of operating with human operators in the loop, the Navy envisions the ships operating alongside fleets as scouts and magazine ships.

$209.2 million of funding for the initial two LUSVs, set to begin construction in 2020, was included in the 2020 Defense Appropriations Bill, with plans to buy eight more over the five-year projection known as the Future Years Defense Program.

As of September 2023, the US Navy budget submission for financial year (FY) 2024 planned for one LUSV to be procured in FY2025, two in FY2026, and three each in FY2027 and 2028, at costs of around US$250 million each.

Australia plans to procure 6 vessels based on the American LUSV design following the Australian Surface Fleet Review

== See also ==
- Future of the United States Navy
- Future of the Royal Australian Navy
- TRIFIC-program
