= Australian large optionally-crewed surface vessel program =

Royal Australian Navy program

Class overview
- Builders: Australian Marine Complex (Austal)
- Operators: Royal Australian Navy (planned)
- Built: TBA
- In commission: TBA
- Planned: 6
- Completed: 0

General characteristics
- Type: Optionally-crewed arsenal ship
- Complement: Optionally-crewed; RAN intends to crew them
- Sensors & processing systems: Aegis Baseline 9
- Armament: Missiles: 32-cell Mk41 VLS

The Australian large optionally-crewed surface vessel program (LOSV) is a procurement program of the Royal Australian Navy aimed at delivering 6 large optionally crewed arsenal ships, armed with 32 Mark 41 vertical launching system cells hosting a range of surface-to-air, land-attack, anti-ship and possibly anti-ballistic missiles. The requirement for these vessels was outlined in the 2024 Surface Fleet Review.

The vessels were speculated to be of the same class as the related American program, however in November 2025 Australian shipbuilder Austal revealed their pitch, the Vantage-class

== Design ==
The ships are intended to be based on the United States' future Large Uncrewed Surface Vehicle, nonetheless, shipbuilder Austal released a pitch for the program. The vessels are intended to be crewed, however the optionally-crewed nature allows for the ships to be autonomous when required. The ships are slated to have 32 strike-length Mark 41 VLS cells, the same number as the much larger New-FFM-class ships ordered for the RAN as well.

== Ships ==
Name	Pennant	Builder	Ordered	Laid down	Launched	Commissioned	Status
TBA		Australian Marine Complex					Not yet ordered
TBA		Australian Marine Complex					Not yet ordered
TBA		Australian Marine Complex					Not yet ordered
TBA		Australian Marine Complex					Not yet ordered
TBA		Australian Marine Complex					Not yet ordered
TBA		Australian Marine Complex					Not yet ordered

== See also ==
- Australian general purpose frigate program
- Large Unmanned Surface Vehicle
- SSN-AUKUS
- Australian Surface Fleet Review
- Future of the Royal Australian Navy
