= New FFM =

Japanese frigate class

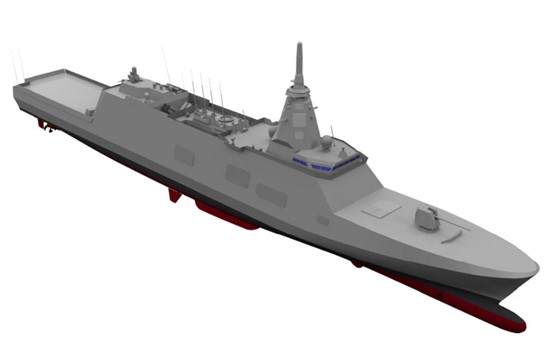
- CGI rendering of the ship by Mitsubishi Heavy Industries

Class overview
- Builders: Mitsubishi Heavy Industries; Japan Marine United
- Operators: Japan Maritime Self-Defense Force; Royal Australian Navy
- Preceded by: Mogami class (Japan); Anzac class (Australia)
- Subclasses: Australian GP frigate
- Built: 2025–present
- In commission: 2028
- Planned: 23 total: 12 (JMSDF); 11 (RAN)
- Building: 2

General characteristics
- Type: Frigate
- Displacement: 4,880 t (4,800 long tons) (standard); 6,200 t (6,100 long tons) (full load)
- Length: 142 m (465 ft 11 in)
- Beam: 17 m (55 ft 9 in)
- Propulsion: CODAG setup: 1 × Rolls-Royce MT30 gas turbine engine (made under licence by Kawasaki; 2 × MAN Diesel V28/33DD STC diesel engines; Two shafts and screw propellers
- Speed: > 30 kn (56 km/h; 35 mph)
- Range: 10,000 nmi (19,000 km)
- Complement: 90
- Sensors & processing systems: Combat systems; Mitsubishi Electric OYQ-1 CMS; OYX-1 operator consoles; Sonars: ASW: TACTASS (TACtical Towed Array Sonar System); ASW: VDS (Variable Depth Sonar); Mine detection: hull mounted sonar; Radars: OPY-2 X-band AESA radar; Electro-optical sensors: TBD; Communications: Communications mast UNICORN (UNIfied COmplex Radio aNtenna); Navigation: TBD
- Electronic warfare & decoys: NOLQ-3E suite
- Armament: VLS: 32-cell Mk 41 VLS; Japan: Type 23 A-SAM; Australia: RIM-162 ESSM (4 × ESSM per cell); Other missiles: Japan: Anti-ship missile canisters; Australia: 1 × RIM-116 RAM; Anti-ship missiles: NSM; Guns: Japan: TBD; Australia: 1 × Mk45 (127 mm); 2 × RCWS (12.7×99mm NATO); Torpedoes: Japan: Type 97 (G-RX4) lightweight ASW; Australia: Mk 54 lightweight ASW
- Aircraft carried: Helicopters: Japan: 1 × MH-60K; Australia: 1 × MH-60R

The New FFM (Japanese: 新型FFM, Hepburn: Shingata FFM), also known as 06FFM or the Upgraded Mogami, is a frigate class planned to be built for the Japan Maritime Self-Defense Force (JMSDF) and the Royal Australian Navy.

The New FFM frigates were ordered instead of continuing with the original production run of the Mogami-class frigates, reducing the planned total of Mogami frigates from 22 to 12. A total of 12 New FFM frigates will be built for the JMSDF. Australia is set to receive up to 11 ships, with the first planned to be commissioned in 2030.

== Background and development ==
The Japan Maritime Self-Defense Force began constructing the Mogami-class (30FFM) frigates in 2018. These vessels were designed for mine countermeasure operations in addition to various littoral missions currently undertaken by destroyers and destroyer escorts of the 10th Escort Squadron, which is not part of the Fleet Escort Force. The original plan was to build 22 ships to replace the eight destroyers and six destroyer escorts of the 10th Escort Squadron, as well as the eight minesweeping vessels of the Mine Warfare Force.

However, on 25 January 2023, the Defense Acquisition Agency announced the "Guidelines for soliciting participants for the 'Planning and Proposal Contract for New FFMs'", and construction from fiscal year 2024 onward would switch to the new ships. On 31 March of the same year, Japan Marine United and Mitsubishi Heavy Industries completed the planning contract. The government, having received proposals from each company on 15 June, decided on 25 August the procurement partner for the class, with MHI being the main supplier, while the JMU would be the subcontractor. On 31 August of the same year, a total of 12 new FFMs were to be built starting with the 2024 planned ships, and 174.7 billion yen will be invested into the construction of two ships in the following fiscal year's budget. The first two ships are scheduled to be commissioned in 2028.

On 11 April 2025, it is reported that the first FFM was already being fitted with the Mk 41 VLS.

The Mogami-class frigates are being built at a rate of two ships per year, but the new FFMs will be built at a faster pace, with a total of 12 ships planned to be procured over a five-year period from 2024 to 2028.

== Design ==
=== Hull ===
Compared to the Mogami class' 3,900-ton standard displacement, the New FFM is heavier at 4,880 tons. The stealth-design hull is also larger in terms of width and length. In addition, the Mogamis have a stealth shear, which was omitted from the new FFM design. The bridge structure appears to have been heavily altered from the one seen on the Mogami-class.

On 21 October 2025, Palfinger was contracted to supply slipway systems for the FFM, having a previous contract to supply the slipways for the Mogami class.

=== Engine configuration ===
The New FFMs would be propelled by a gas turbine engine and two diesel engines in a CODAG arrangement, in order to achieve the 30-knot (56 km/h; 35 mph) top speed. This arrangement is shared with the Mogami class, with a pair of conventional screw propellers.

== Equipment ==
=== C4ISR system ===
As the ship will be equipped with the Type 23 surface-to-air guided missile as shown below, it will be fitted with an illuminator for missile guidance to the multi-function radar, as well as an FC network, which is essentially the Japanese version of the Naval Integrated Fire Control Counter-Air (NIFC-CA). Since the multi-function radar is based on the OPY-2, which is originally designed for individual ship air defense, it has been suggested that it will be necessary to improve its capabilities in the future.

The ship will be equipped with a multi-function sonar that functions both as a vessel and mine detector.

=== Weapon systems ===
==== Japan ====
The Type 23 ship-to-air missile is the ship's primary air defence weapon. The ship is also equipped with the ship-board version of the Type 12 surface-to-ship missile (12SSM). The Type 23 missile, along with the Type 07 (07VLA) anti-submarine missiles, will be housed in a 32-cell VLS on the bow deck.

Other equipment will be similar to that of the Mogami class.

==== Australia ====
On 5 August 2025, the New FFM was selected by the Royal Australian Navy. Rear Admiral Hughes, Head of Naval Capability RAN, commented at Indo Pacific 2025 that the Australia Mogami frigates would be equipped with the Kongsberg Naval Strike Missile instead of the Type 17 anti-ship missile. It will be equipped with the Mark 54 Torpedo, SeaRAM, and deploy RIM-162 ESSM in the Mk 41 VLS.

On 11 May 2026, Raytheon was awarded a contract to provide SeaRAMs.

== Partnerships ==
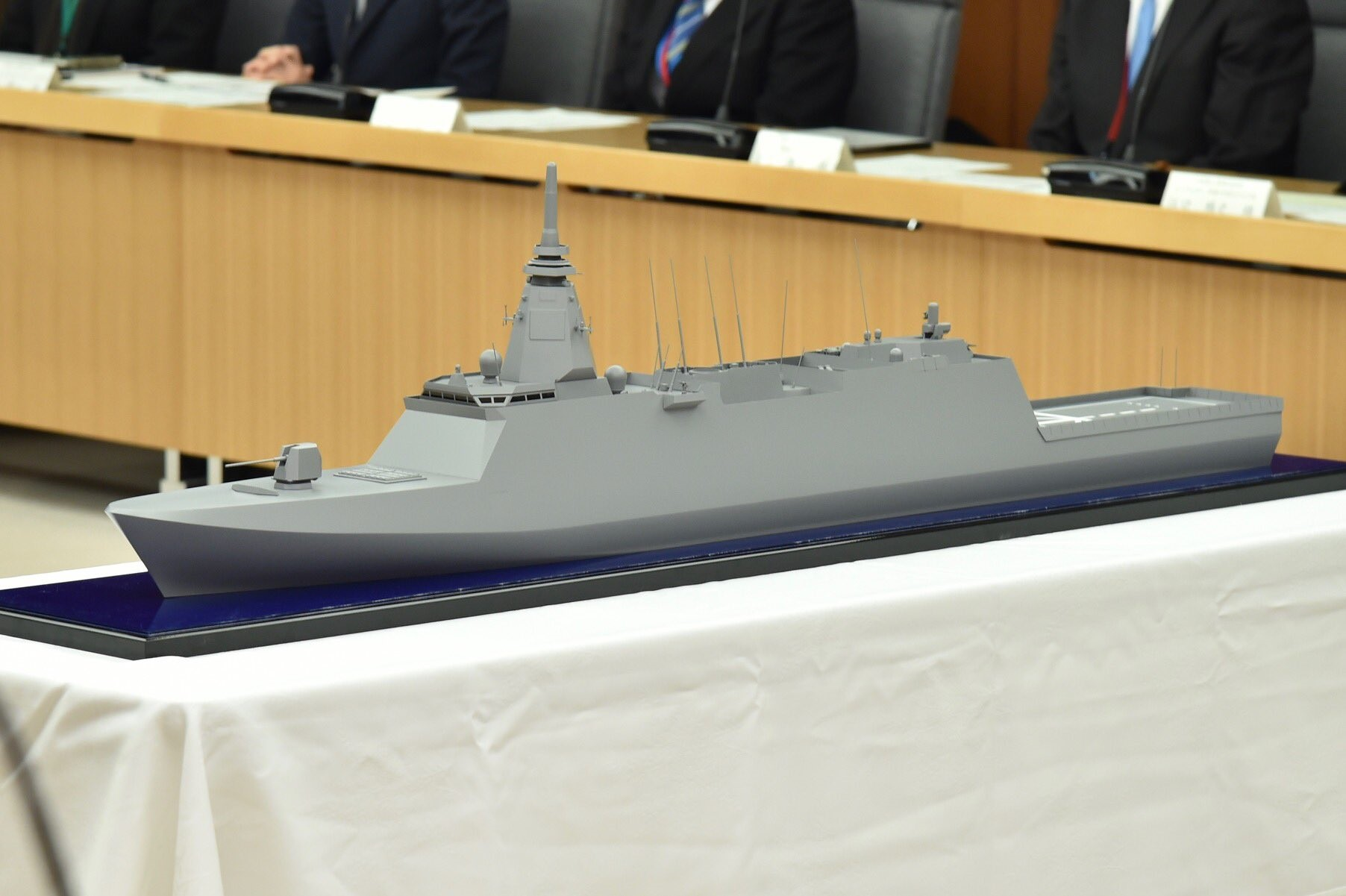
A model of the New FFM on display at the Australian General Purpose Frigate Promotion Committee, December 2024

=== Australia ===
The Acquisition, Technology & Logistics Agency and Mitsubishi Heavy Industries displayed a model of the new surface combat ship "FFM-AAW" at the Indo Pacific 2023 maritime defense exhibition held at the International Convention Centre in Sydney, Australia from 7 to 9 November 2023. The FFM-AAW is a derivative model of the New FFM for overseas markets, and was presented to overseas countries.

On 21 February 2024, the Australian Department of Defence announced it was seeking a replacement for the ageing Anzac-class frigates. Four international designs were shortlisted: Japan's Mogami-class frigate, Germany's MEKO A-200, Spain's ALFA3000, and South Korea's Daegu-class frigate.

By 8 November 2024, the shortlist had narrowed to just two options — Japan and Germany. The Australian Broadcasting Corporation reported that the government planned to invest AUD$11 billion (around ¥1.12 trillion) over the next ten years in the project.

On 5 August 2025, Defence Minister Richard Marles confirmed that Australia had officially selected Japan's New FFM.

On 21 April 2026, the MT30 will be supplied by Rolls Royce to power the ships.

== Potential exports ==
=== India ===
In April 2026, Japan has offered the upgraded Mogami-class frigates under licence production to Indian shipyards. They could complement the larger Project 17B-class frigates being developed by the Indian Navy.

=== New Zealand ===
The New Zealand government has reportedly begun talks with Japan in the sidelines of the Indo Pacific 2025 defence expo in Sydney, Australia about a potential acquisition of the "Upgraded Mogami" for the Royal New Zealand Navy (RNZN) as a replacement for their in-service Anzac-class frigates. On 7 May 2026, the New Zealand Ministry of Defense announced that the Type 31 frigate and the Upgraded Mogami were the two contenders to replace the RNZN's Anzac-class frigates. On 26 May 2026, it was announced that discussions on potentially acquiring the Mogami would take place in Singapore during the Shangri-La Dialogue security forum in a trilateral dialogue with Japanese Defense Minister Shinjiro Koizumi, New Zealand Defense Minister Chris Penk and Australian Defense Minister Richard Marles.

=== Taiwan ===
On 15 April 2026, Taiwanese media reported that the ROC Navy is considering the New FFM to replace their Kang Ding-class frigates and Cheng Kung-class frigates.

=== Indonesia ===
In late August 2026, Japan, Indonesia, and Australia held a first-ever trilateral defense ministers' meeting involving Japanese Defense Minister Shinjiro Koizumi, Indonesian Defense Minister Sjafrie Sjamsoeddin, and Australian Defense Minister Richard Marles. During the meeting, Australia shared its procurement insights regarding its ongoing SEA 3000 program for 11 Upgraded Mogami-class frigates to assist Jakarta's evaluation of the platform.

The trilateral talks followed a renewed interest from Indonesia in acquiring up to eight Upgraded Mogami-class (New FFM) frigates—leveraging Australia's export precedent to address its naval modernization needs. The revived proposal outlines a plan to construct four vessels in Japan and co-produce the remaining four domestically at the state-owned shipyard PAL Indonesia through technology transfers. However, working-level discussions are tentative, as Indonesia is expected to finalize its parallel negotiations with Tokyo regarding the acquisition of second-hand Asagiri-class destroyers before committing to a commercial contract for the New FFM program.

== Ships of the class ==
No.	Name	Builder	Status	Contract	Laid down	Launched	Comm.	Homeport	Notes
Japan Maritime Self-Defense Force
FFM-13	TBA	Mitsubishi Heavy Industries	Under contract	Mar 2025 (FY 2024)	2028 (planned)	–	–	TBA	
FFM-14	TBA	Japan Marine United	Under contract	Mar 2025 (FY 2024)	2028 (planned)	–	–	TBA	
FFM-15	TBA	Mitsubishi Heavy Industries	2032	Feb 2026 (FY 2025)	–	–	–	TBA	
FFM-16	TBA	Mitsubishi Heavy Industries	2032	Feb 2026 (FY 2025)	–	–	–	TBA	
FFM-17	TBA	Japan Marine United	2032	Feb 2026 (FY 2025)	–	–	–	TBA	
FFM-18	TBA	–	Planned contract	TBA (FY 2026)	–	–	–	TBA	
Royal Australian Navy
TBA	TBA	Mitsubishi Heavy Industries	Under contract	Apr 2026	2026 (planned)	2029 (planned)	2030 (planned)	TBA	
TBA	TBA	Mitsubishi Heavy Industries	Under contract	Apr 2026	–	–	–	TBA	
TBA	TBA	Mitsubishi Heavy Industries	Under contract	Apr 2026	–	–	–	TBA	
TBA	TBA	Australian Marine Complex	–	–	2026 (planned)	–	–	TBA	–
TBA	TBA	Australian Marine Complex	–	–	–	–	–	TBA	–
TBA	TBA	Australian Marine Complex	–	–	–	–	–	TBA	–
TBA	TBA	Australian Marine Complex	–	–	–	–	–	TBA	–
TBA	TBA	Australian Marine Complex	–	–	–	–	–	TBA	–
TBA	TBA	Australian Marine Complex	–	–	–	–	–	TBA	–
TBA	TBA	Australian Marine Complex	–	–	–	–	–	TBA	–
TBA	TBA	Australian Marine Complex	–	–	–	–	Before 2040	TBA	–

== See also ==
- List of active Japan Maritime Self-Defense Force ships
- Aegis system equipped vessels (ASEV)
- Sakura-class patrol ship

=== Equivalent modern general purpose frigates ===
- Thaon di Revel class
- FDI class
- Tamandaré class
- Formidable class
- Victory class
- Pohjanmaa class
- Nilgiri class
