= Australian general purpose frigate program =

Program to produce eleven frigates for the Royal Australian Navy

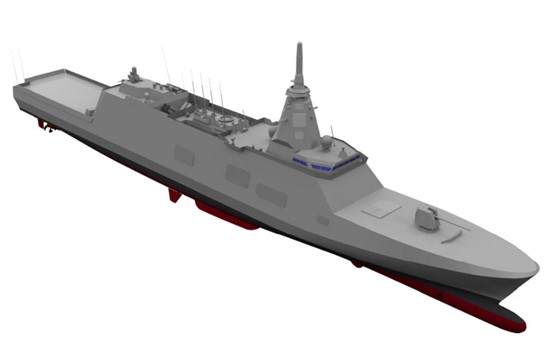
- CGI rendering of the New FFM by Mitsubishi Heavy Industries

Class overview
- Builders: Mitsubishi Heavy Industries (3); Australian Marine Complex (8)
- Operators: Royal Australian Navy (planned)
- Preceded by: Anzac-class frigate
- Built: From 2026 (planned)
- In commission: From 2030 (planned)
- Planned: 11
- Completed: 0

General characteristics
- Type: Frigate
- Displacement: 4,880 t (4,800 long tons) (standard); 6,200 t (6,100 long tons) (full load)
- Length: Approx. 142 m (465 ft 11 in)
- Beam: Approx. 17 m (55 ft 9 in)
- Propulsion: CODAG setup: 1 × Rolls-Royce MT30 gas turbine engine; 2 × MAN V28/33DD STC diesel engines; Two shafts and screw propellers; Electric generation: MTU Series 4000
- Speed: Over 30 kn (56 km/h; 35 mph)
- Range: 10,000 nmi (19,000 km; 12,000 mi) at economic speed
- Complement: 90 (with accommodation for up to 138)
- Sensors & processing systems: Systems: OYQ-1 (Combat management system with OYX-1-29 console display systems); Sonars: OKI OQQ-25 ASW towed array sonar; OQQ-11 anti-mine hull mounted sonar; Radars: OPY-2 (X-band, multi-purpose AESA GaN radar); Electro-optical sensors: Mitsubishi Electric OAX-3 EO/IR sensor; Communications: Advanced Tactical Data Links; Navigation:
- Electronic warfare & decoys: Electronic attack: NOLQ-3E (Passive radar system + Electronic attack capability is integrated into the main radar antenna)
- Armament: Missiles: 4 × 8-cell Mk41 VLS with: up to 128 RIM-162 ESSM; other sea-to-air / sea-to-surface missiles; 1 × 11-cell SeaRAM CIWS; 2 × 4-canister Naval Strike Missile launchers; Torpedoes: 2 × 3-tube Mark 32 torpedo launchers for Mk54 LWTs; Guns: 1 × 5"/62 caliber Mark 45 mod 4 main gun (127 mm)
- Aircraft carried: 1 × MH-60 Romeo Seahawk, VTOL UAVs
- Aviation facilities: Helicopter flight deck; Enclosed hangar
- Notes: Can launch USVs and MCM UUVs

In February 2024, the Australian Government announced a program to acquire 11 general purpose frigates for the Royal Australian Navy (RAN). These warships arose from the Surface Fleet Review, and along with the significantly larger Hunter-class frigates, will replace the Anzac-class frigates. The program is referred to as Project SEA 3000.

The new general purpose frigates are intended to be 'Tier 2 surface combatant' vessels that are less expensive and capable than the Hunter-class frigates and Hobart-class destroyers. They will be used to escort other vessels, provide air defence and conduct attacks against surface targets. Four suitable designs were identified by an independent panel, with the government selecting a winning design in August 2025: the Japanese Mitsubishi Heavy Industries' New FFM. Contracts will be confirmed and construction of the ships will commence in 2026. The first three of the frigates will be built in Japan, with the first ship completed by 2029. The remaining eight ships will be built in Australia at the Australian Marine Complex in Henderson, WA from 2030.

== Planning ==
The 2023 Australian Defence Strategic Review raised concerns over the plans to acquire nine Hunter-class frigates for the Royal Australian Navy. The review also noted that other navies were tending to build larger numbers of smaller warships. In response, the Australian Government commissioned an independent review of the structure of the RAN's future surface fleet. The review panel was led by the retired United States Navy Vice Admiral William Hilarides and also included the retired Australian public servant Rosemary Huxtable and the retired Australian Vice Admiral Stuart Mayer.

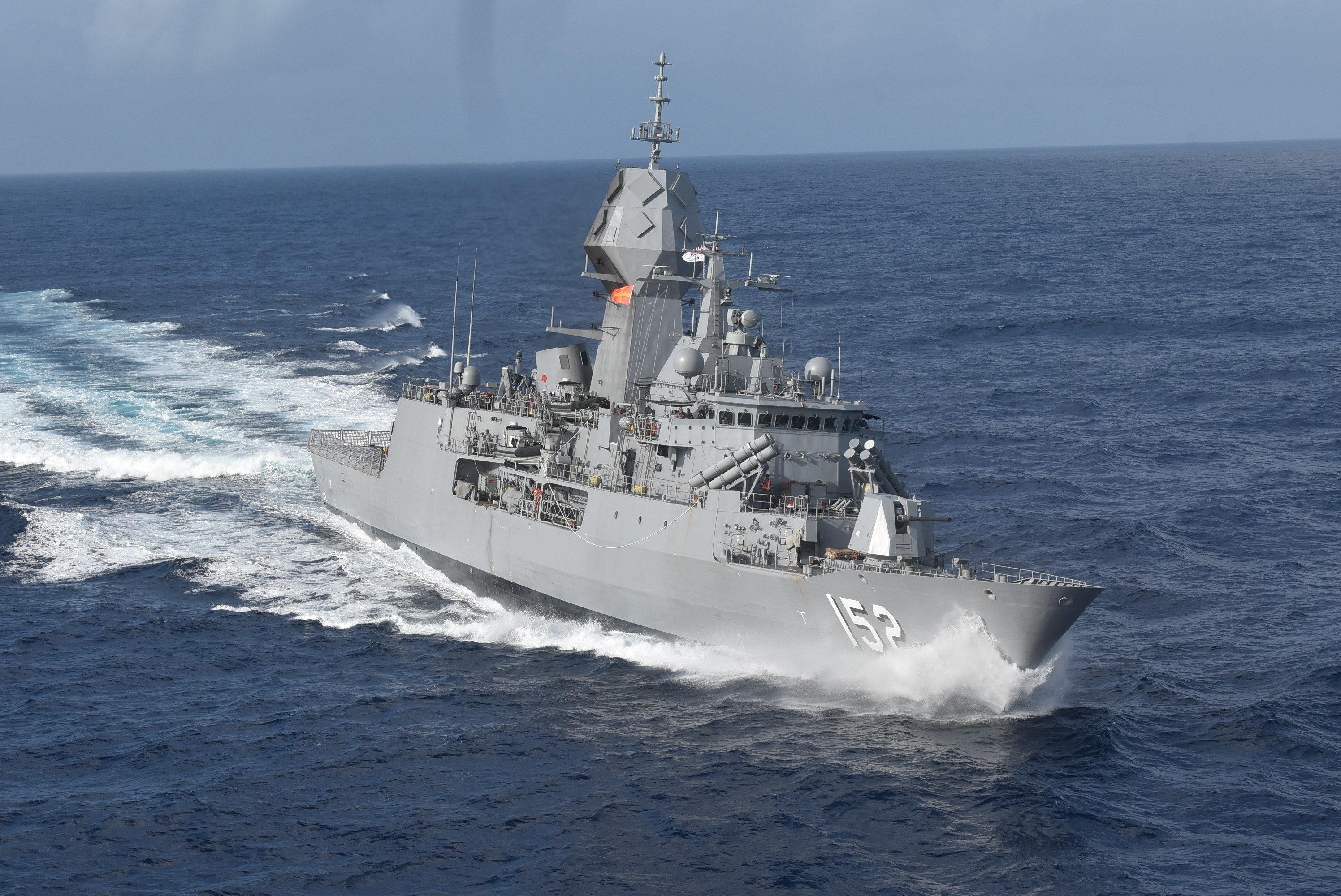
Anzac-class frigate HMAS Warramunga in 2021

The Surface Fleet Review and the government's response to it were released on 20 February 2024. Among a range of other recommendations, the panel called for the acquisition of "at least seven, and optimally 11, 'Tier 2' ships, optimised for undersea warfare, to operate both independently and in conjunction with the 'Tier 1' ships to secure maritime trade routes, northern approaches and escort military assets". They noted that the ships should be capable of operating a helicopter, be able to provide air defence "through a limited number of point and self-defence systems" and have the ability to attack targets on the land. Due to the deteriorating material condition of the Anzac-class frigates, the panel also recommended that the new ships be rapidly acquired.

The Australian Government accepted these recommendations, and announced as part of its response that eleven general purpose frigates would be built in order to "address the risk presented by an ageing and increasingly fragile surface combatant fleet". The government also agreed to reduce the number of Hunter-class frigates to be acquired from nine to six and to build six large optionally crewed surface vessels which will support the crewed warships. This will result in a fleet made up of nine 'Tier 1' warships (six Hunter-class frigates and three Hobart-class destroyers), with the general purpose frigates being among the navy's less capable 'Tier 2' warships.

In order to bring the general purpose frigates into service as quickly as possible, the government intended for the first three ships in the class to be built by the selected winning bidder in their own shipyards, with the remainder being constructed at the Australian Marine Complex in Western Australia. In April 2024, the government committed between A$7 billion and A$10 billion between the 2024–25 and 2033–34 financial years for the first three of the general purpose frigates.

== Design ==
=== Proposed designs ===
The independent review identified four designs as "combatant exemplars" and recommended that they "should form the basis of a deliberate selection process". The government agreed to this. All four of these designs were under construction at the time for foreign navies.

The designs were:

- Spanish ALFA3000
- South Korean Daegu class FFX Batch II or Batch III
- German MEKO A-200
- Japanese New FFM (Upgraded Mogami)

Based on these designs, it was evident that the general purpose frigates will have a displacement of between 3,000 and 5,000 tonnes. Similar to the Anzac class, which have a displacement of 3,600 tonnes, and much smaller than the Hunter class which will displace 10,000 tonnes. The frigates were to have at least 16 vertically launched missile cells, twice as many as the Anzac class.

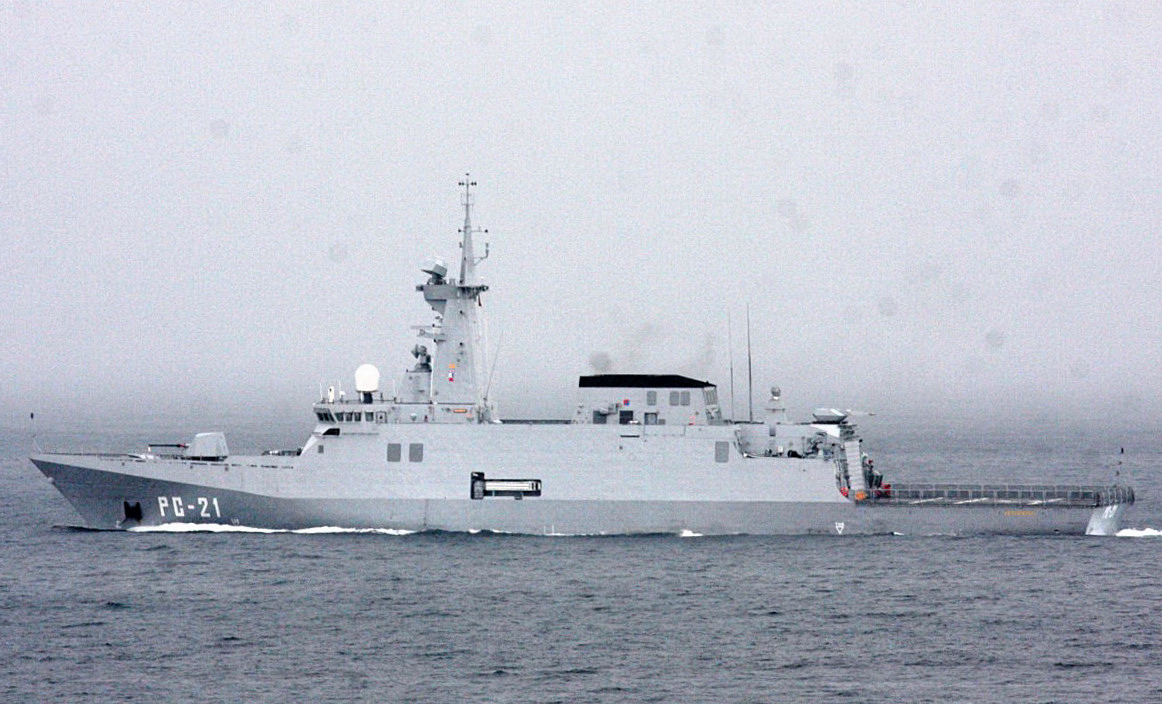
The Venezuelan patrol boat Guaiquerí, a variant of the ALFA3000 design

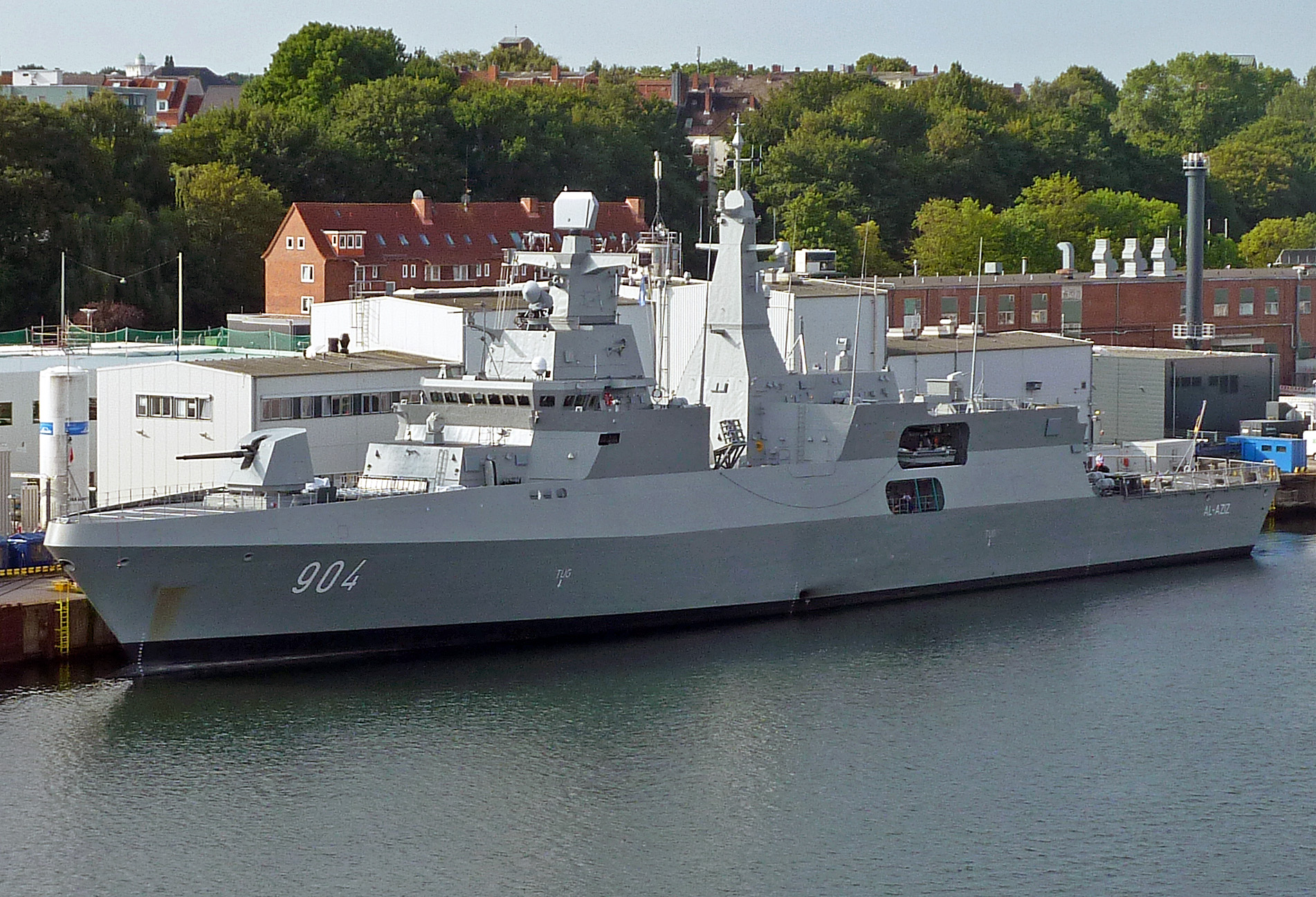
ENS Al-Aziz, a MEKO A-200 frigate

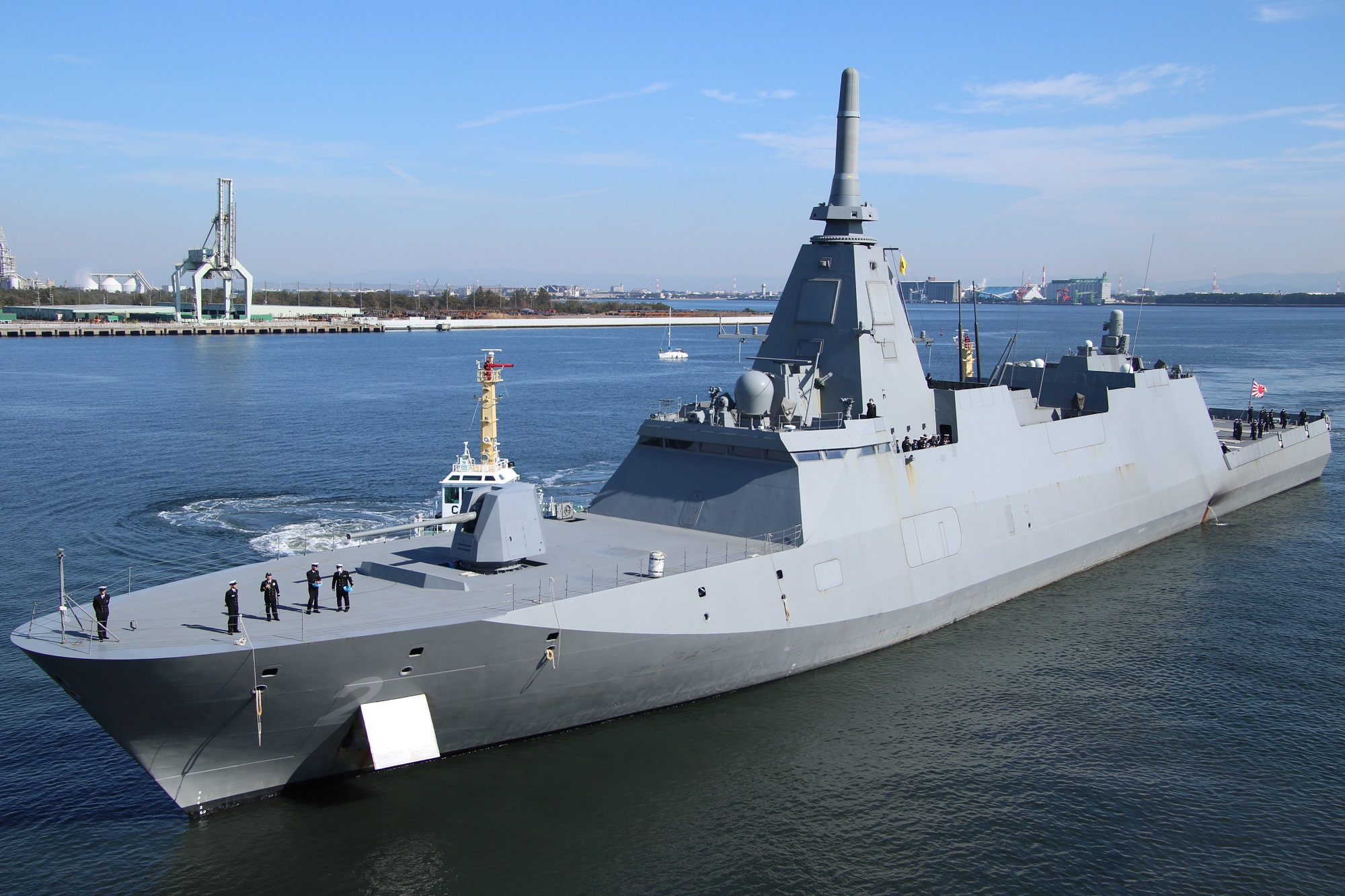
JS Kumano, a Mogami 30FFM frigate

=== Selection ===
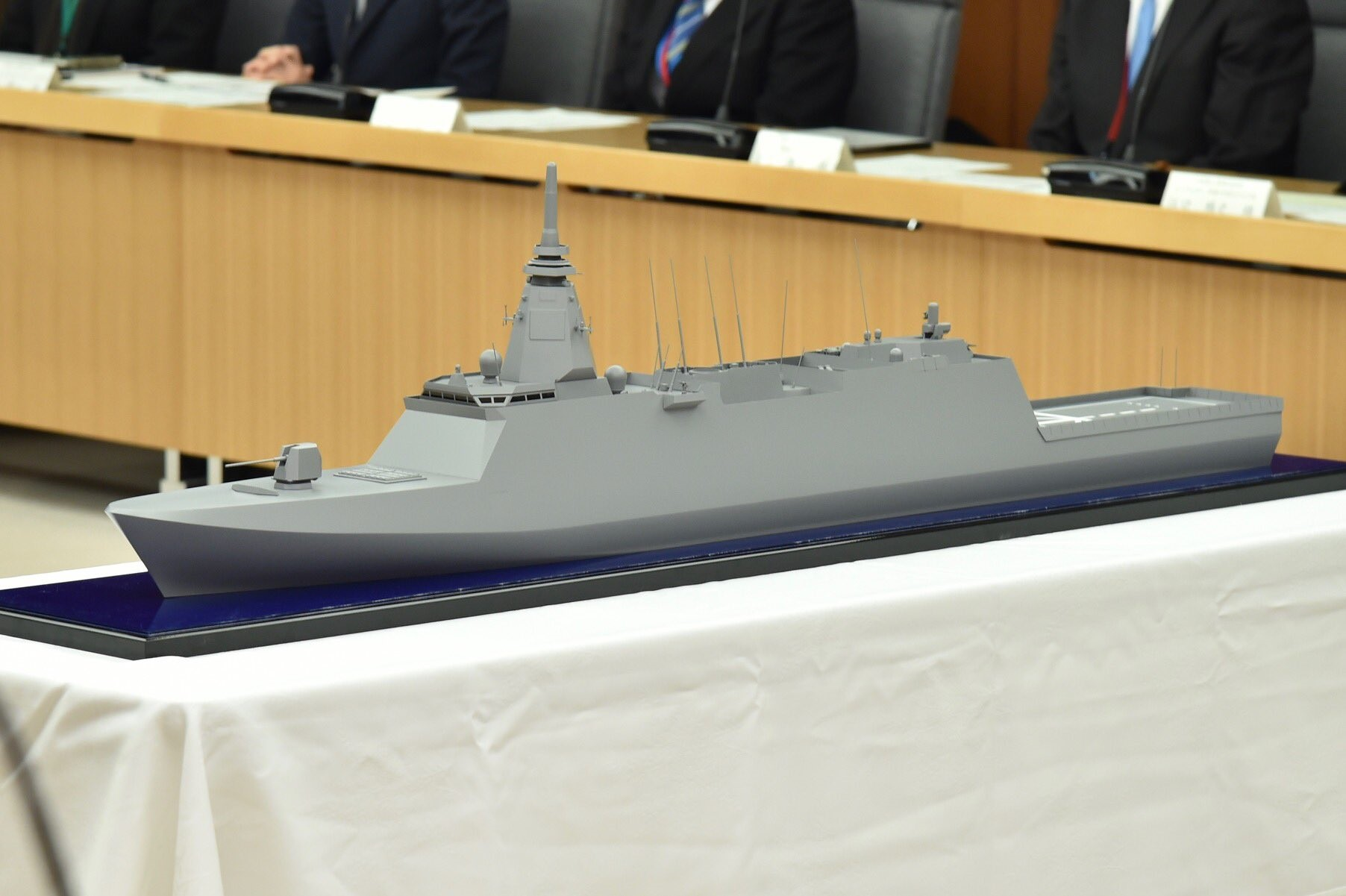
A model of the New FFM design on display at the Australian Parliament in December 2024

On 24 May 2024, the Department of Defence sent five shipbuilders an 'approach to market' asking them to provide information on their proposed designs and how the frigates would be built for the RAN. The companies were asked to provide this information within three weeks. This covered the first three ships in the intended class only. The government intends to conduct a separate process to ask the companies for plans to build the remaining ships in Australia. The companies that were approached were Hanwha Ocean, Hyundai, Mitsubishi Heavy Industries, Navantia and TKMS.

As part of the approach to market, it was specified that the designs that are submitted must be based closely on ships that are currently in service with foreign navies. The only changes that the Department of Defence will accept are to replace obsolete equipment or meet Australian safety standards. The project office was required to seek agreement from the National Security Committee for all changes that deviate from foreign designs. The Chief of Navy has not been asked by the government to propose modifications but has responsibility for ensuring that the final design meets the necessary safety standards. As a result, the ships will not be fitted with radars produced by the Australian company CEA Technologies, despite the Australian government being the majority owner of the firm.

After the proposals are received in mid-2024, the project office evaluated each proposals viability. Those that were judged to be viable were further evaluated and the final design was intended to be selected in late 2024. This stage of the project and subsequent stages were intended to be run as a standard RAN acquisition program.

On 7 November 2024, it was reported that bids from Japan's Mitsubishi Heavy Industries and Germany's TKMS were selected ahead of bids from South Korea's HHI and Hanwha Ocean, and Spain's Navantia. Three designs were reportedly selected with TKMS offering two MEKO A200 designs, one based on an unmodified Egyptian Navy's Al Aziz-class frigates and an "Australianised" variant featuring Saab Australia's 9LV combat system and with MHI offering the New FFM. The final decision was expected to be made by the end of 2025 with the contract to be signed in early 2026 to begin construction of the first three frigates.

On 5 August 2025, Defence Minister Richard Marles revealed that the New FFM had officially been chosen for the program.

Rear Admiral Hughes, Head of Naval Capability RAN, commented at Indo Pacific 2025 that the Australia Mogami frigates would be equipped with the Kongsberg Naval Strike Missile instead of the type 17 anti-ship missile. It would also be equipped with the Mk 54 lightweight torpedo, SeaRAM, and deploy ESSM in the Mk 41 VLS. It was also confirmed that the Australian New FFM would utilise the NOLQ-3E UNICORN electronic warfare mast and the OPY-2 X-band phased array radar, as used on JMSDF vessels.

The Australian and Japanese governments signed a contract for the construction of the first three ships on 18 April 2026. The ceremony for this event took place on board a Mogami-class frigate that was visiting Melbourne.

On 21 April 2026, the MT30 will be supplied by Rolls Royce to power the ships.

== Commentary ==
Australian Financial Review journalist Andrew Tillet wrote that the ALFA3000 and Mogami 30FFM designs best meet the government's requirements. He argued that this is because the two shipbuilders (Navantia and Mitsubishi respectively) have experience integrating the American Aegis Combat System and American missiles. Writing in the Asia-Pacific Defence Reporter, journalist Kym Bergmann argued that the panel had made a mistake by recommending both the Daegu class FFX Batch II and Batch III, as the two designs are quite different, and that the government was also mistaken in not identifying this error at the time it developed its response to the review. He argued that the Batch III is the only one of the two designs that meets the panel's specifications. Australian Strategic Policy Institute analyst Euan Graham suggested in February 2024 that New Zealand might join the frigate program in order to replace the Royal New Zealand Navy's pair of Anzac-class frigates.

Following the approach to market, Michael Shoebridge from the defence consulting firm Strategic Analysis Australia raised concerns about the project's management. He believes that rushing the selection of the ships could cause problems later in the project and that the reluctance to accept design changes might mean that the frigates do not meet the RAN's safety standards.

== Ships ==
The initial three ships are set to be constructed in Japan using the original design. The remaining eight ships will be built at a shipyard in Henderson, Western Australia.

Name	Pennant	Builder	Ordered	Laid down	Launched	Commissioned	Status	Namesake
Japanese construction
TBD		Mitsubishi Heavy Industries, Japan	18 April 2026	2026	2028	2030		
TBD		Mitsubishi Heavy Industries, Japan	18 April 2026					
TBD		Mitsubishi Heavy Industries, Japan	18 April 2026		2034	2035		
Australian construction
TBD		Australian Marine Complex, Henderson						
TBD		Australian Marine Complex, Henderson						
TBD		Australian Marine Complex, Henderson						
TBD		Australian Marine Complex, Henderson						
TBD		Australian Marine Complex, Henderson						
TBD		Australian Marine Complex, Henderson						
TBD		Australian Marine Complex, Henderson						
TBD		Australian Marine Complex, Henderson						
*Italics indicate planned date

== See also ==
- Future of the Royal Australian Navy
- Australian light destroyer project
- Australian large optionally-crewed surface vessel program
