= NSM =

NSM may refer to:

== Businesses ==
- New Seasons Market, a chain of grocery stores
- Nack, Schulze und Menke, a German manufacturer of jukeboxes
- NASDAQ Stock Market
- Nederlandsche Stoomboot Maatschappij, a Dutch shipping line
- Nederlandsche Scheepsbouw Maatschappij, a Dutch shipbuilder

== Computing ==
- N-ary storage model, of database management systems
- Network and Systems Management, software made by Computer Associates
- Network security monitor or intrusion detection system
- Network Status Monitor protocol, of the Network File System

== Military ==
- Nasjonal Sikkerhetsmyndighet, the Norwegian National Security Authority
- Naval Strike Missile, a cruise missile developed by Kongsberg Defence & Aerospace 1997–2007
- Nausena Medal, an Indian military award

== Politics ==
- National Socialist Movement, various neo-Nazi organizations
- New Socialist Movement, an Indian political party in Gujarat
- New social movements, which depart from conventional paradigms

== Science and medicine ==
- National Science Museum of Japan's collection code
- Natural semantic metalanguage, in linguistics
- Neurogenic stunned myocardium
- New Smoking Material, tobacco substitutes
- Nipple-sparing mastectomy, a type of surgery

== Other uses ==
- Norseman Airport, Western Australia (IATA code:NSM)
- Non-Stipendiary Minister, an unpaid priest
- New Sector Movements, a British music project
