= Future of the Royal Australian Navy =

The Royal Australian Navy, although a significant force in the Asia-Pacific region, is nonetheless classed as a medium-sized navy. Its fleet is based around two main types of surface combatant, with limited global deployment and air power capability. However, in 2009, a white paper, Defending Australia in the Asia Pacific Century: Force 2030, was produced by the Australian government which set out a programme of defence spending that will see significant improvements to the RAN's fleet and capabilities. Australia released its Surface Fleet Review in 2024, which analysed the future of the RAN and outlined a procurement plan.

The Defence White Papers released in 2013 and 2016, along with the 2020 Defence Strategic Update, maintained a relatively conservative approach to the Royal Australian Navy's force structure. These documents reaffirmed plans for a modest fleet comprising two landing helicopter docks, twelve diesel-electric submarines, twelve frigates and destroyers, and twelve offshore patrol vessels (OPVs). However, the establishment of AUKUS in 2021, the release of the Defence Strategic Review in 2023, and the Independent Surface Combatant Fleet Review in 2024 have marked a significant shift in naval planning. The plans proposed to expand the Royal Australian Navy to a size not seen since the end of the Second World War, including eight nuclear-powered attack submarines, three Hobart-class air warfare destroyers, six Hunter-class anti-submarine warfare frigates, eleven general-purpose frigates, six large optionally-crewed surface vessels equipped with a vertical launch system, six offshore patrol vessels, and ten patrol boats. This major expansion was projected to be complete by the 2040s.

== Future vessels ==
The following is a list of vessels currently (as of June 2026) ordered or under construction for the Royal Australian Navy:

Class	Ship	Pennant No.	Builder	Type	Displacement	Launched	Commissioning	Status
Arafura class	Pilbara	OPV 205	Civmec, Australian Marine Complex	Offshore patrol vessel	1,640 tonnes	31 October 2025	2026	Under construction
Arafura class	Gippsland	OPV 206	Civmec, Australian Marine Complex	Offshore patrol vessel	1,640 tonnes		2027	Under construction
Arafura class	Illawarra	OPV 207	Civmec, Australian Marine Complex	Offshore patrol vessel	1,640 tonnes		2028	Under construction
Arafura class	Carpentaria	OPV 208	Civmec, Australian Marine Complex	Offshore patrol vessel	1,640 tonnes		2029	Under construction
Sail training ship	Young Endeavour II		Birdon Group, Port Macquarie	Barquentine				Under construction
General Purpose Frigate	TBD		Mitsubishi Heavy Industries, Japan	Frigate, guided missile	6,200 tonnes	2029	2030	Ordered
General Purpose Frigate	TBD		Mitsubishi Heavy Industries, Japan	Frigate, guided missile				Ordered
General Purpose Frigate	TBD		Mitsubishi Heavy Industries, Japan	Frigate, guided missile		2034		Ordered
General Purpose Frigate	TBD		Australian Marine Complex	Frigate, guided missile				Planned
General Purpose Frigate	TBD		Australian Marine Complex	Frigate, guided missile				Planned
General Purpose Frigate	TBD		Australian Marine Complex	Frigate, guided missile				Planned
General Purpose Frigate	TBD		Australian Marine Complex	Frigate, guided missile				Planned
General Purpose Frigate	TBD		Australian Marine Complex	Frigate, guided missile				Planned
General Purpose Frigate	TBD		Australian Marine Complex	Frigate, guided missile				Planned
General Purpose Frigate	TBD		Australian Marine Complex	Frigate, guided missile				Planned
General Purpose Frigate	TBD		Australian Marine Complex	Frigate, guided missile			Before 2040	Planned
Hunter class	Hunter		BAE Systems Maritime Australia, Osborne Naval Shipyard	Frigate, guided missile	8,200 tonnes		2032	Under construction
Hunter class	Flinders		BAE Systems Maritime Australia, Osborne Naval Shipyard	Frigate, guided missile	8,200 tonnes			Ordered
Hunter class	Tasman		BAE Systems Maritime Australia, Osborne Naval Shipyard	Frigate, guided missile	8,200 tonnes			Ordered
Hunter class	TBD		BAE Systems Maritime Australia, Osborne Naval Shipyard	Frigate, guided missile	8,200 tonnes			Planned
Hunter class	TBD		BAE Systems Maritime Australia, Osborne Naval Shipyard	Frigate, guided missile	8,200 tonnes			Planned
Hunter class	TBD		BAE Systems Maritime Australia, Osborne Naval Shipyard	Frigate, guided missile	8,200 tonnes			Planned

The following is a list of vessels currently planned for the Royal Australian Navy:

Programme	Ship	Builder	Type	Displacement	Launched	Commissioning
Virginia class	TBD	General Dynamics Electric Boat, Newport News Shipbuilding, United States	Attack submarine, nuclear-powered	7,900 tonnes		2032
Virginia class	TBD	General Dynamics Electric Boat, Newport News Shipbuilding, United States	Attack submarine, nuclear-powered	7,900 tonnes		
Virginia class	TBD	General Dynamics Electric Boat, Newport News Shipbuilding, United States	Attack submarine, nuclear-powered	7,900 tonnes		
SSN-AUKUS	TBD	ASC Pty Ltd and BAE Systems Maritime Australia, Osborne Naval Shipyard	Attack submarine, nuclear-powered	10,000 tonnes		Early 2040s
SSN-AUKUS	TBD	ASC Pty Ltd and BAE Systems Maritime Australia, Osborne Naval Shipyard	Attack submarine, nuclear-powered	10,000 tonnes		
SSN-AUKUS	TBD	ASC Pty Ltd and BAE Systems Maritime Australia, Osborne Naval Shipyard	Attack submarine, nuclear-powered	10,000 tonnes		
SSN-AUKUS	TBD	ASC Pty Ltd and BAE Systems Maritime Australia, Osborne Naval Shipyard	Attack submarine, nuclear-powered	10,000 tonnes		
SSN-AUKUS	TBD	ASC Pty Ltd and BAE Systems Maritime Australia, Osborne Naval Shipyard	Attack submarine, nuclear-powered	10,000 tonnes		
ADV Ocean Protector replacement	TBD					
Salvage and repair vessel	TBD					
Australian large optionally-crewed surface vessel program	TBD	Australian Marine Complex	Optionally Crewed Surface Vessel			
Australian large optionally-crewed surface vessel program	TBD	Australian Marine Complex	Optionally Crewed Surface Vessel			
Australian large optionally-crewed surface vessel program	TBD	Australian Marine Complex	Optionally Crewed Surface Vessel			
Australian large optionally-crewed surface vessel program	TBD	Australian Marine Complex	Optionally Crewed Surface Vessel			
Australian large optionally-crewed surface vessel program	TBD	Australian Marine Complex	Optionally Crewed Surface Vessel			
Australian large optionally-crewed surface vessel program	TBD	Australian Marine Complex	Optionally Crewed Surface Vessel			
Hobart class replacement	TBD	Osborne Naval Shipyard				
Hobart class replacement	TBD	Osborne Naval Shipyard				
Hobart class replacement	TBD	Osborne Naval Shipyard				

== Surface combatants ==
=== Anzac-class helicopter frigate ===
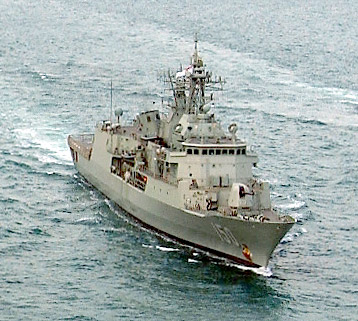
Anzac-class frigate HMAS Anzac

The Anzac-class frigate is the main surface combatant of the Royal Australian Navy. The first unit was commissioned in 1996 and the last entered service in 2006. Starting in November 2003, all eight frigates underwent extensive upgrades under Project SEA 1448 Phase 2, the Anzac Ship Anti-Ship Missile Defence upgrade. Completed in two phases, the following systems were upgraded and installed:

- Upgrade to the Saab Systems 9LV 453 Combat Management System.
- Installation of a SAGEM Vampir NG Infra-Red Search and Track System capable of detecting anti-missile and low-flying aircraft near land.
- Installation of an Australian CEAFAR S-band phased array radar and CEAMOUNT X-band multi-channel phased array missile illuminator to deliver enhanced target detection and better tracking, allowing Evolved Sea Sparrow missiles to engage multiple targets simultaneously.
- Installation of an I-Band navigation radar to replace existing target indication and Krupp Atlas 9600 radar systems.

Final Operating Capability was scheduled for October 2017. The vessels were expected to remain in service until 2032 where they will be replaced with up to nine frigates designed primarily for anti-submarine warfare. Further upgrades under the Anzac Midlife Capability Assurance Program, AMCAP, started in 2018 and were completed in 2026.

The upgrades included using CEAFAR L-band long-range air search radar also planned for use on the Hunter-class frigates.

Other major work as part of AMCAP upgrade included:

- Upgraded ventilation systems; new sewage systems;
- Improvements to the Control and Monitoring System;
- Engine modifications to improve power and efficiency;
- New communications suite (SEA1442);
- Upgraded LESCUT;
- Upgraded AN/SLQ-25C torpedo self-defence systems; and
- Technical insert for the Saab 9LV 453 combat management system migrating its operating system from Windows to Linux.

=== Hobart-class destroyer ===
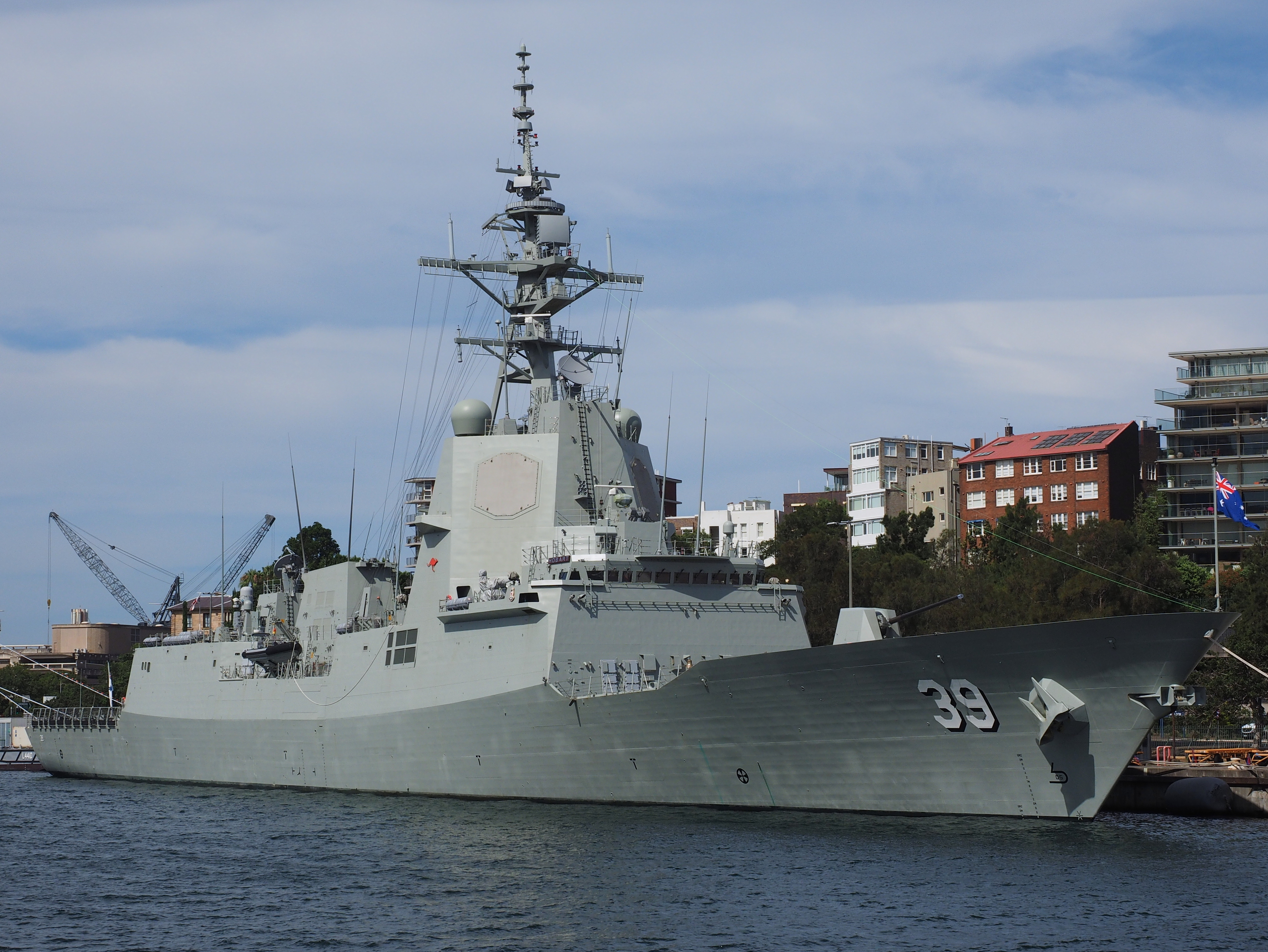
Hobart-class destroyer HMAS Hobart

The Hobart-class destroyers replaced the Adelaide-class frigates. Although the 2009 Defence White Paper and original contract provided for four ships in this class, but the 2016 Defence White Paper resulted in only three being built. Each destroyer was fitted with the Aegis combat system and was based on the F100 design by Spanish shipbuilding company Navantia. Each vessel had cruise missiles and the SM-6 anti-aircraft missile. Hobart was commissioned on 23 September 2017, with the following vessels delivered in 2018 and 2019. The destroyers were built by ASC Pty Ltd. Upgrades to this class include an upgraded Aegis Combat System with an Australian developed tactical interface which will be the same as on the Hunter-class FFG. Future potential upgrades include the integration of the SM-6 and the acquisition of the Naval Strike Missile as a replacement of the RGM-84 Harpoon anti-ship missile. The government will invest up to $5.1 billion in upgrades to the Hobart-class destroyer combat management system upgrades at Osborne from 2024.

=== Hunter-class frigate ===
With the Anzac-class frigates due to begin retiring in the late 2020s, work on a replacement program has begun. The program is expected to cost AU$35 billion and a request for tender for the vessel design was released in March 2017 to three contenders: Navantia, Fincantieri, and BAE Systems as part of a competitive evaluation process. In June 2018, Prime Minister Malcolm Turnbull announced that a variation of the BAE design had been selected as the preferred tender for the Hunter-class frigates. Construction will begin in Adelaide, South Australia in 2020. Australian shipbuilding company BAE Systems Maritime Australia will become a subsidiary of BAE Systems Australia for the duration of the build. It was announced in February 2024 that only six Hunter-class vessels would be built and would serve alongside three upgraded Hobart-class vessels forming the Navy's 'Tier 1' vessels.

=== Tier 2 Force ===
With the announced changes to the future Navy's Force Structure discussions around what would form the components of the class, or classes, composing the 'Tier 2' force. While the announced changes included increasing the surface fleet from 11 to 26 vessels the majority of the change would come from within this 'Tier 2' force - a combined 17 vessels in this category. The 17 vessels would consist of six new "optionally crewed" vessels to "significantly enhance" the Navy's long-range strike capabilities along with a fleet of 11 'general purpose frigates' with designs from Japan, South Korea, Germany and Spain being considered.

== Amphibious warfare ==
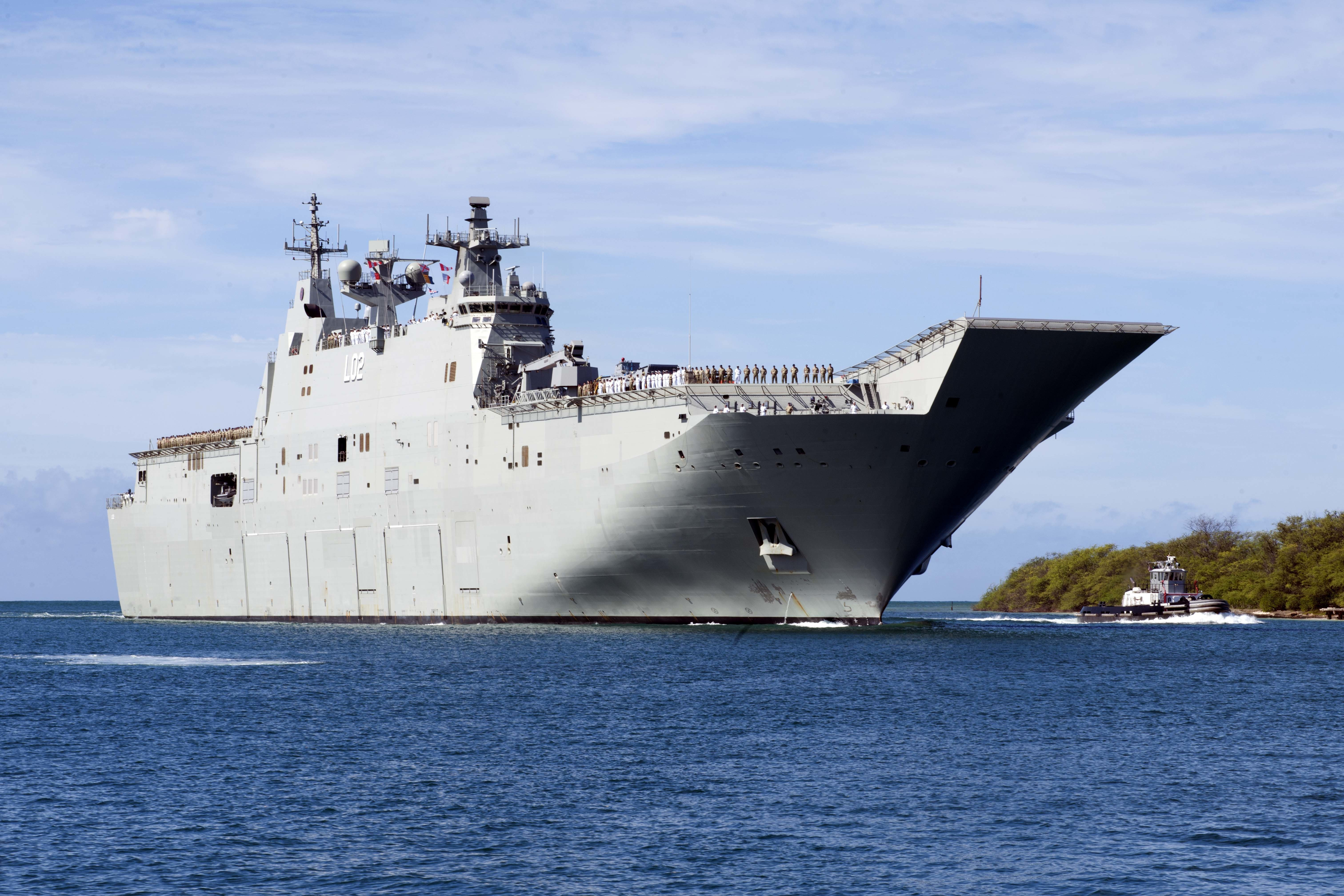
HMAS Canberra in 2016

The RAN's amphibious capabilities was greatly increased by a new class of two Canberra-class landing helicopter dock. These ships, based on Navantia's Strategic Projection Ship (later commissioned into the Spanish Navy as Spanish ship Juan Carlos I), displace approximately 27,000 tonnes, can transport 1,000 personnel and 150 vehicles, and can transport these ashore through landing craft carried in a well deck, or helicopters, with up to six operating simultaneously from each ship's flight deck. The new ships, named HMAS Canberra and HMAS Adelaide, their hulls were built at Navantia's shipyard in Spain, then transported to BAE Systems Australia (BAE acquired Tenix Defence after contract awarded) facilities at Williamstown Dockyard for finishing. The two ships replaced the Kanimbla-class amphibious vessels. HMAS Tobruk was to be replaced by a strategic sealift vessel of 10,000 to 15,000 tons displacement, which will provides the capacity to transport equipment, supplies, helicopters, and soldiers into zones of operation, and embark or disembark these without port facilities. .In the 2016 defence white paper it revealed that HMAS Choules would fulfill this role. Following the early decommissioning of both Kanimblas and Tobruk being out of action, multiple ships were purchased and or leased to cover the lack of amphibious capability. The RAN planned also replace the six Balikpapan-class heavy landing craft with six larger vessels. In mid-2011, the RAN acquired the former British Royal Fleet Auxiliary landing ship RFA Largs Bay, which entered service in December 2011 as HMAS Choules.

== Minor vessels ==
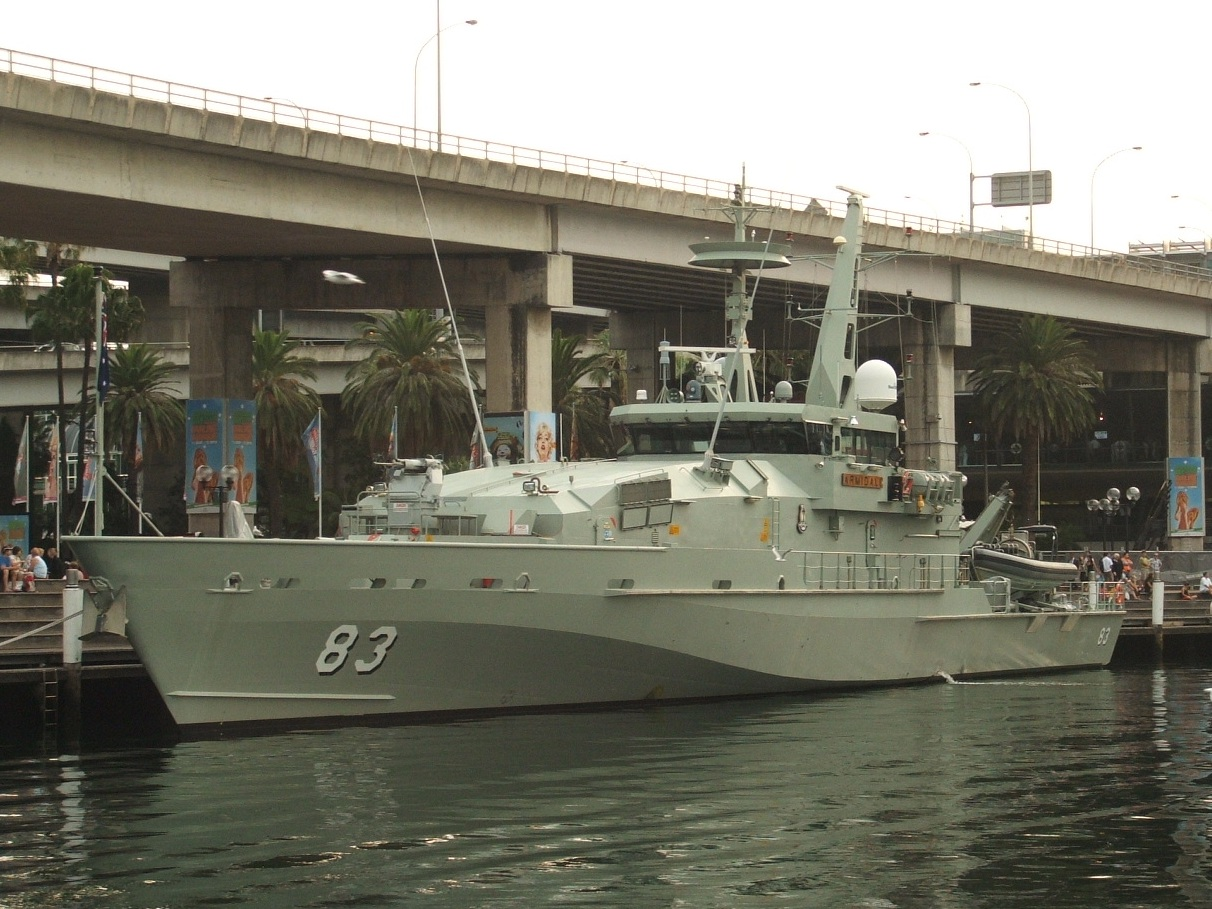
The Armidale-class patrol boat HMAS Armidale

Between 1999 and 2003, the RAN acquired six Huon-class minehunters. Based on Intermarine's Gaeta-class minehunters, each ship is equipped with a variable depth sonar, and a pair of Bofors Double Eagle underwater clearance vehicles.

The RAN's main patrol force is the Armidale class. The first of these, HMAS Armidale, was commissioned in June 2005, and was the first of fourteen. HMAS Glenelg, the last ship of the class was commissioned in 2008. Two ships have been decommissioned. HMAS Bundaberg in 2014 as a result of extensive damage caused by a fire and HMAS Pirie in 2021.

The 2009 Defence White Paper announced that a new class of 20 offshore combatant vessels would replace the Armidale and Huon classes, along with the Leeuwin and Paluma-class survey ships. The multi-role ships are predicted to displace anywhere up to 2,000 tonnes, and may be equipped with a helicopter or unmanned aerial vehicle. However the 2016 Defense White Paper decreased the amount of planned vessels to twelve and stated that they would only replace the Armidales while the other classes would see life-extension work. Lurssen's OPV 80 design was chosen. The class was named Arafura-class offshore patrol vessel (OPV). The first ship will be named Arafura. It was determined that this class would be reduced, both in terms of vessel count down from 12 to 6, but also in role with their focus shifting to civil maritime security operations.

During the 2019 election campaign, Scott Morrison announced that one hydrographic survey ship and two minehunters would be constructed from the mid-2020s in the Henderson Shipyard Precinct Under SEA 1905 and SEA 2400. SEA 2400 Hydrographic Data Collection Capability Program which includes the introduction of a Strategic Military Survey Capability (SMSB) to replace the Leeuwin-class survey vessels. While SEA 1905 is the acquisition of a further two Arafura-class offshore patrol vessels in a mine counter-measures configuration. This was expanded in the 2020 Defence Strategic Update and 2020 Force Structure Plan released on 30 June 2020 for up to 8 vessels optimised for mine countermeasures and hydrographic survey roles potentially based on the Arafura design.

The Government announced that six evolved Cape-class patrol boats from Austal to be built in Henderson, Western Australia will be acquired for A$350 million on 1 May 2020 to boost patrol capability.

== Submarines ==
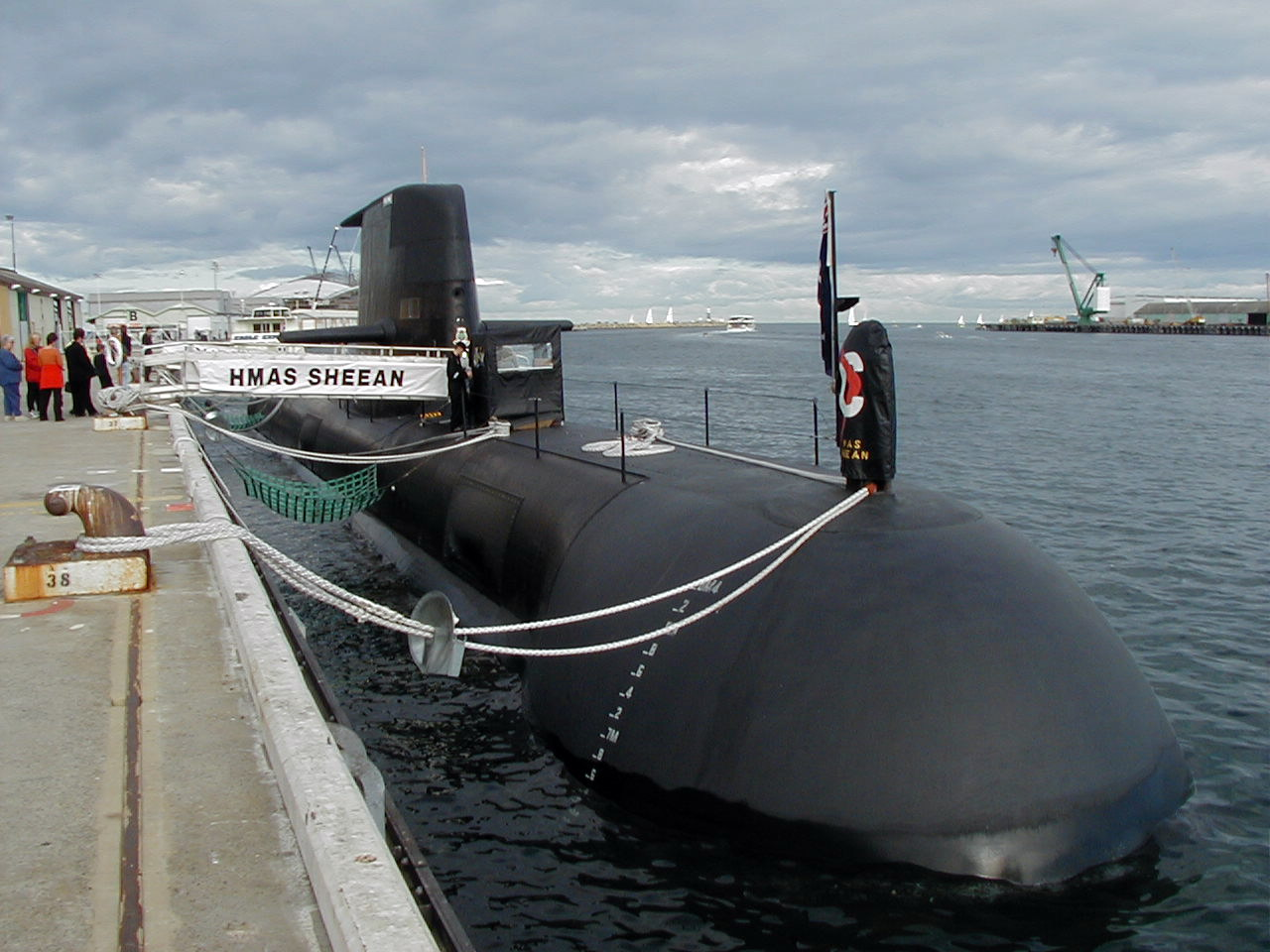
Collins-class submarine HMAS Sheean

The Collins-class submarines, the first of which entered service in 1996, are due to receive a major upgrade to their combat systems, with technology based on the US Navy's Virginia class. This new system will be introduced in conjunction with the new heavyweight torpedo.

In the longer term, the Collins-class submarines will begin to reach the end of their useful life in 2026. To meet an in-service date of 2026, advanced design work on the next generation of Australian submarines will begin by 2014–2015. The submarines are likely to be Australian-built, conventional submarines equipped with air independent propulsion and advanced combat and communications systems. Defence Minister Joel Fitzgibbon ordered planning to begin on the next generation of submarines to replace the Royal Australian Navy's Collins-class fleet. The 17-year project will be the largest, longest and most expensive defence acquisition since Australia's Federation, potentially costing up to $25 billion. The submarines are expected to be capable of carrying long-range cruise missiles and midget-subs.

According to the 2009 Defence White Paper, the submarine fleet is to be expanded to 12. The submarines will be equipped with cruise missiles and the world's most advanced torpedoes, sonars, combat systems, intelligence gathering systems as well as also being able to support special forces operations. The first submarine is expected to be in service by 2030. The 2009 White Paper predicted the cost of the new submarines at $35 billion.

=== Collins class ===
To avoid a capability gap prior to the anticipated entry into service of the first of 12 Attack-class submarines, Defence Minister Peter Dutton has confirmed that all 6 of the Collins-class submarines will undergo major life-of-type extensions (LOTEs). Approximately $6 billion would be invested in the program. It is expected to involve rebuilding each submarine once it achieves 30 years of service, with each upgrade scheduled to take approximately two years.

=== SSN-AUKUS ===
On 15 September 2021, Australian, US, and UK leaders announced the AUKUS agreement which included the construction of nuclear powered submarines for the RAN replacing the previous plan to acquire 12 French designed diesel-electric powered Attack-class submarine A specific plan for the acquisition of nuclear-powered submarines was outline in March 2023 and will proceed in three phases.

In the first phase RAN personnel will be trained by the US and UK, while Australia develops submarine shipyard infrastructure and maintenance facilities. Starting in 2027 the US and UK will deploy Virginia-class and Astute-class submarines to Australia as part of "Submarine Rotational Force West". The second phase, starting from 2032, will then see the RAN acquire three Virginia-class submarines, with the option to acquire two more. The final phase will involve Australia and the United Kingdom jointly developing the SSN-AUKUS. Australia will build five SSN-AUKUS boats by 2055 and eight by the mid-2060s.

=== Autonomous underwater and surface vehicles ===
The RAN has three active undersea, robotic platform programs of record currently underway, including the Anduril Ghost Shark Extra Large Autonomous Underwater Vehicle (XL-AUV), the jointly developed Cellula Robotics / Trusted Autonomous Systems SeaWolf Extra-Large Unmanned Underwater Vehicle (XLUUV), an evolution of the Solus-LR (now the Envoy AUV), and the C2 Robotics Speartooth Large Uncrewed Underwater Vehicle (LUUV).

Three prototype Ghost Shark XL-AUVs were ordered for the RAN in May 2022. The first prototype was publicly revealed in April 2024, with the RAN acquiring a fleet of 'dozens' of Ghost Shark XL-AUVs in a A$1.7 billion investment, entering service from early 2026.

Surface autonomous robotic programs are spearheaded by the Ocius Bluebottle Uncrewed Surface Vessel (USV) surveillance platform, which is designed to conduct long-endurance surveillance missions. The Bluebottle can also act as a communications gateway for underwater vehicles.

== Afloat Support ==
The RAN currently has two ships used for afloat support/replenishment at sea: HMAS Supply and HMAS Stalwart. Supply, replaced the former support ship HMAS Success in April 2021, while Stalwart replaced the fleet oiler HMAS Sirius in November 2021. Supply and Stalwart are based on the Navantia built Spanish Navy's replenishment vessel Cantabria.

The 2020 Defense Strategic Update And 2020 Force Structure Plan announced the planned procurement of two new additional multi-role sealift and replenishment ships, a replacement of the ADV Ocean Protector, a large salvage and repair vessel, a replacement for the youth training ship STS Young Endeavour and a new vessel to support the Pacific Step-Up. The two announced multi-role sealift and support ships - Project Sea2200 - would be domestically built and replace HMAS Choules and enhance the logistical support of the RAN. As of May 2022 BMT Group was the sole company having submitted a proposal based on their ELLIDA design, adapted from the Royal Fleet Auxiliary designated as Tide class, however, the Damen Group reportedly had also shown interest in submitting a design based on their joint support ship class.

== Fleet Air Arm ==
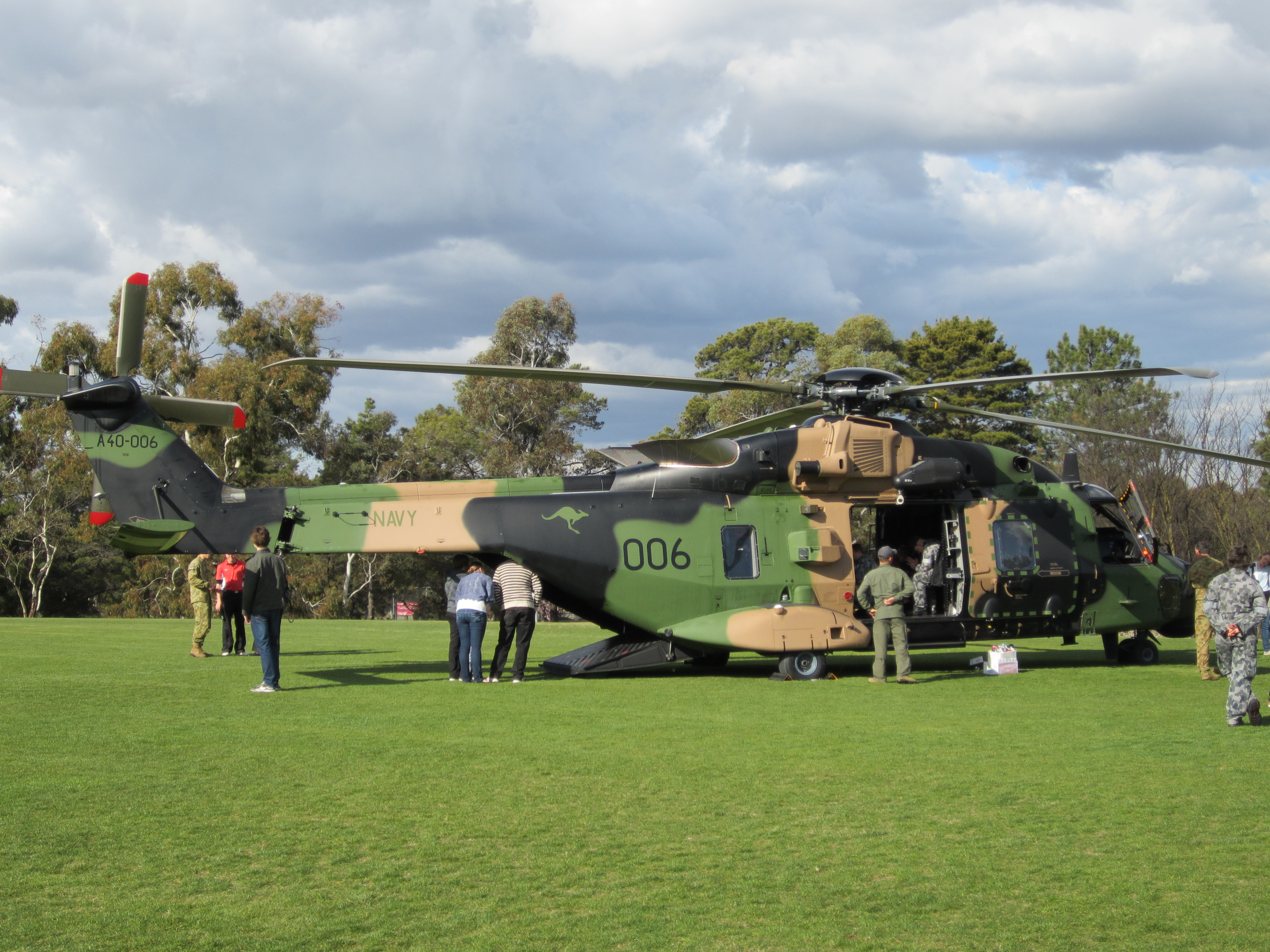
One of the RAN's MRH-90s in 2011

The Fleet Air Arm is currently an all-rotary winged organisation. The RAN operates 23 MH-60R "Romeo" Seahawk helicopters.

The RAN plans to expand and rationalise its support and logistics helicopter fleet by replacing the 6 MRH-90s and operating only one type of helicopter to ease maintenance and training, with an additional 12 MH-60R helicopters. In May 2022, the Morrison government announced that it would purchase 12 MH-60Rs to replace the MRH-90 fleet and a 13th to replace a MH-60R that was ditched in the Philippine Sea in October 2021. In September 2022, the Albanese government placed an order for 12+1 MH-60Rs.

== List of major projects ==
(Updated to reflect changes made in the Defence Capability Plan – June 2011 Supplement)

- 2009: JP 2048 – Amphibious Deployment and Sustainment program
  - Phase 5: Balikpapan-class landing craft replacement – 6 new LCH design
    - RFI assessment completed. RFP to be issued early 2012.
    - Army has taken over the program with LAND 8710 Phase 2 Landing Craft Heavy project in 2024.
- Sea 1000 – Design and Procurement of Future Submarine
  - Phase 1 & 2: Phase 1 (Design) and Phase 2 (Acquisition) has been combined. Decision not due until 2017–2020 or so.
- Sea 1180 – Arafura-class offshore patrol vessel.
- Sea 1360 – Maritime Extended Range Air Defence (Standard SM-6 for Hobart-class destroyer)
  - Phase 1: Project definition stage. Budget for capability reduced from $1–$2b to $500m-$1b.
- Sea 1439 – Installation of new combat system for Collins-class submarines
  - Phase 4A: Replacement Combat System.
    - Currently underway, IOC has been achieved and FOC expected by 2013.
    - Replacement system is the same AN/BYG-1v8 system fitted to the Virginia-class SSN.
  - Phase 4B: Weapon & Sensor Enhancements.
    - Currently underway.
  - Phase 6: Sonar Replacement.
    - Given first-pass approval.
- Sea 1450 – Collins-class Life Of Type Extension (LOTE) program.
- Sea 1448 – Anzac-class frigate capability upgrades
  - Phase 2B: Anzac-class Anti-Ship Missile Defence upgrade
    - HMAS Perth successfully completed trials of ASMD upgrade in July 2011.
    - The upgrade of the other seven Anzac-class frigates has been given government approval. The upgrade is due to begin early 2012 and be complete by 2017.
  - Phase 4A: ES system improvement given first-pass approval.
  - Phase 4B: AN/SPS-49 (Air Search Radar) replacement budget increased from $100–$300m to $300–$500m.
    - CEAFAR-L has replaced the AN/SPS-49 radar on all ships as of 2024.
- Sea 1654 – Maritime Operational Support Capability
  - Phase 3: HMAS Success replacement
    - Keel laid for HMAS Supply on 18 November 2017; she commissioned in April 2021. Second vessel of the class, HMAS Stalwart, commissioned in November 2021.
- Sea 4000 – Hobart-class destroyer program
  - Phase 6: Combat Systems Upgrade Program intended to upgrade the destroyers' Aegis CMS from Baseline 7.1 Refresh to Baseline 9.
- Sea 5000 – Hunter-class frigate program
  - Phase 1: Project definition stage. Contract awarded to BAE Systems Australia June 2018, 9 ships to enter service 2027 - 2042
- Sea 3000 – General Purpose Frigate Program
  - Phase 1: An RFI have been released to 5 shipbuilders (Hanhwa, Hyundai, TKMS, Navantia and Mitsubishi asking how they would build the first 3 ships overseas and how the following 3 ships of similar design will be built in Australia. The RFI for the last 5 ships will be released at a later date. Decision on the design will be made in 2025.

A full listing of all current projects is available at the Capability Acquisition and Sustainment Group (CASG) website.

=== Recently completed projects ===
- JP 3030 – HMAS Choules procurement
- JP 2048 – Amphibious Deployment and Sustainment program
- Sea 4000 – Design and procurement of new Air Warfare Destroyers
- Air 9000 – Future Naval Aviation Combat System

== See also ==
- Future of the United States Navy
- Future of the Royal Navy
- Future of the Indian Navy
- Future of the Russian Navy
