= Arsenal ship =

Conceptual floating missile platform

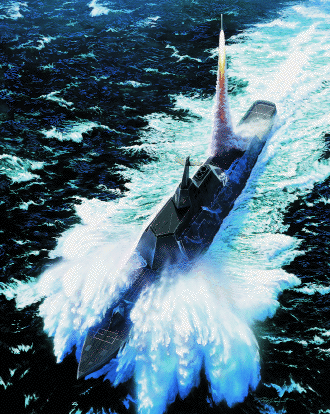
Depiction of a surface combatant launching a missile

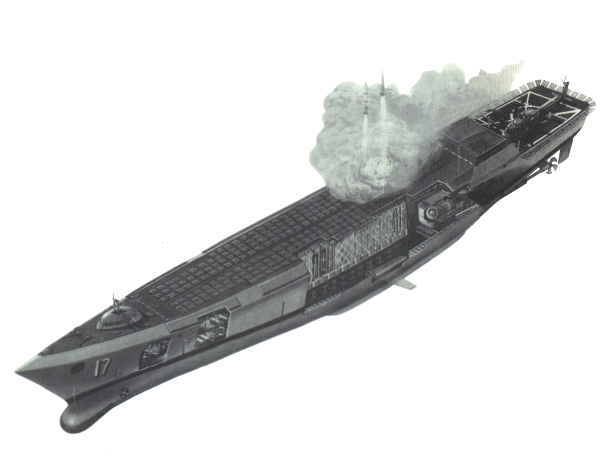
1988 depiction of an arsenal ship

An arsenal ship is a naval concept for a warship intended to serve as a floating missile launcher platform with as many as five hundred vertical launch bays for large-sized guided missiles, most likely cruise missiles. In current U.S. naval thinking, such a ship would initially be controlled manually by an Aegis Cruiser, although plans that have long since been scrapped included control by AEW&C aircraft such as the E-2 Hawkeye and E-3 Sentry.

== History ==
Originally proposed by VADM Joseph Metcalf, DCNO Surface Warfare, as a component of the "Surface Combatants of the 21st Century" initiative in the mid-1980s. Later, proposed by the U.S. Navy in 1996, the arsenal ship had funding problems, with the United States Congress canceling some funding, and the Defense Advanced Research Projects Agency (DARPA) providing some funding to individual contractors for prototypes. Some concept artwork of the Arsenal Ship was produced, with some images bearing the number "72", possibly hinting at an intent to classify the arsenal ships as a battleship, since the last battleship ordered (but never built) was USS Louisiana (BB-71).

The arsenal ship would have a small crew and as many as 500 vertical launch tubes for missiles to provide ship-to-shore bombardment for invading troops. The Navy calculated a $450 million price for the arsenal ship, but Congress scrapped funding for the project in 1998.

The U.S. Navy has since modified the four oldest Ohio-class Trident submarines to SSGN configuration, allowing them to carry up to 154 Tomahawk cruise missiles using vertical launching systems installed in the tubes which previously held strategic ballistic missiles, creating a vessel roughly equivalent to the arsenal ship concept.

In 2013, Huntington Ingalls Industries revived the idea when it proposed a Flight II version of the LPD-17 hull with a variant carrying up to 288 VLS cells for the ballistic missile defense and precision strike missions.

China has conducted studies and tested models of partially and completely submersible arsenal ship concepts. South Korea is also planning to deploy three arsenal ships by the late 2020s. These South Korean arsenal ships are designated "Joint Strike Ships", or "JSS".

== See also ==
- Kirov-class battlecruiser
- Strike cruiser
