= Australian Marine Complex =

Marine maintenance facility in Western Australia

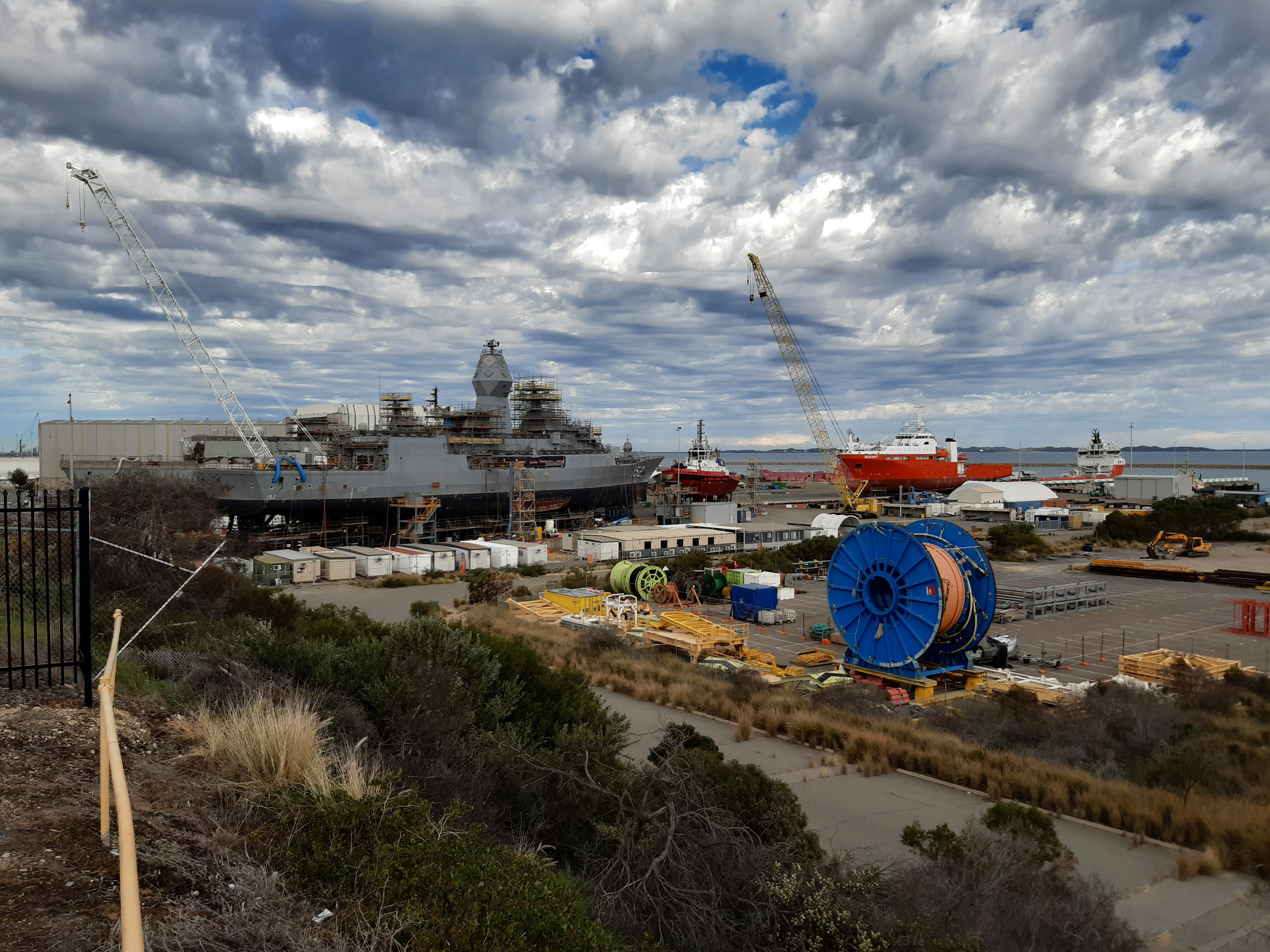
- HMAS Warramunga (FFH 152), HMAS Perth (FFH 157), MV Besant and MMA Responder at the AMC in July 2020, with Garden Island and HMAS Stirling in the background
- Interactive map of Australian Marine Complex
- Coordinates: 32.158°S 115.7662°E
- Country: Australia
- State: Western Australia
- City: Perth
- LGA: City of Cockburn
- Location: 23 km (14 mi) SW of Perth

The Australian Marine Complex (AMC) is a marine industry precinct located at Henderson, Western Australia, 23 kilometres (14 mi) south of the Perth central business district. It is located on Cockburn Sound.

== Overview ==
The complex was established in 2003 when the Common User Facility, owned by the Western Australian Government, commenced operations. It is home to approximately 150 businesses in five designated zones. The facility is operated by Western Australian's state government-owned property developer DevelopmentWA and AMC Management (WA) Pty Ltd.

The complex is divided into shipbuilding, technology, support industry, fabrication and recreational boating precincts.

The recreational boating precinct, at the northern end of the complex, consists of the Jervoise Bay boat harbour. The fabrication precinct is located at the southern end of the complex, while the shipbuilding precinct is located along the coast between the two. The technology and support precincts are located inland, to the east. The shipbuilding precinct serves as a maintenance facility for the Royal Australian Navy's Collins-class submarines and Anzac-class frigates, being located across Cockburn Sound from HMAS Stirling on Garden Island.

Major tenants of the facility include Austal, BAE Systems Australia and Civmec.

In 2010, the A$60 million floating dock Yargan commenced operations at the Australian Marine Complex, Yargan being the Noongar word for 'tortoise'. The dock is capable of lifting up to 12,000 tonnes (26 million pounds) from the water and to transfer up to 3,500 tonnes (7.7 million pounds) from water to land. The dock's initial purpose was to serve as a maintenance facility for the Collins class submarines.

In March 2022, Prime Minister of Australia Scott Morrison announced a A$4.3 billion investment to establish a large vessel dry dock at the Australian Marine Complex. Construction of the facility was scheduled to start in 2023. After being paused for review by the new Albanese ministry, in September 2025 it was confirmed the upgrade would proceed as part of the AUKUS project.

== Anzac Mid-Life Capability Assurance Program ==
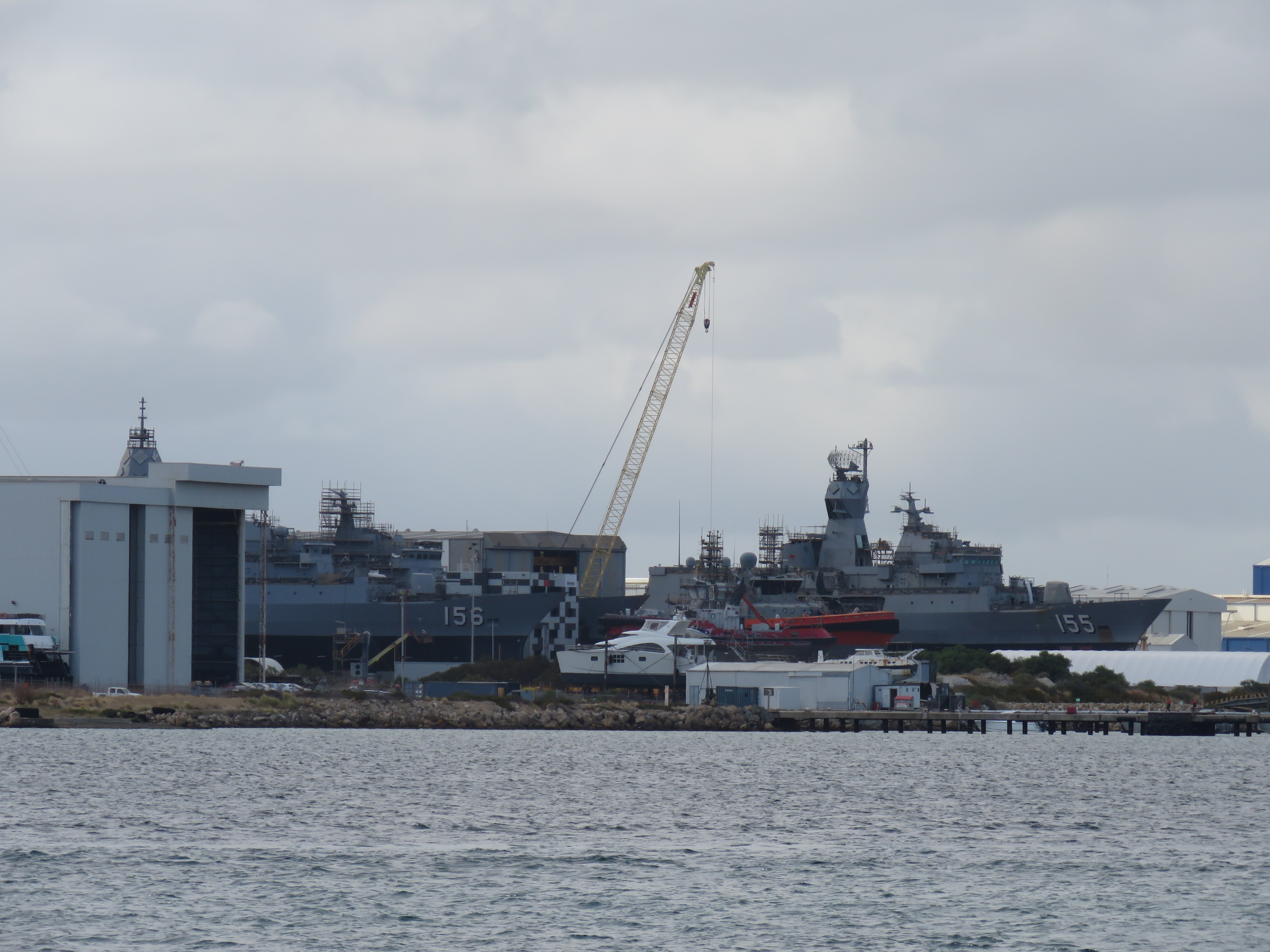
HMAS Toowoomba (FFH 156) and HMAS Ballarat (FFH 155) at Australian Marine Complex in March 2022

The Anzac-class frigates of the Royal Australian Navy currently undergo their Mid-Life Capability Assurance Program (AMCAP) at the Australian Marine Complex, with HMAS Arunta (FFH 151) being the first of the eight ships to complete this upgrade by 2019. HMAS Anzac (FFH 150) was the second ship to complete this program, returning to service in 2020, HMAS Warramunga (FFH 152) the third and HMAS Perth (FFH 157) the fourth to complete this service.

As of March 2022, HMAS Toowoomba (FFH 156), HMAS Stuart (FFH 153) and HMAS Ballarat (FFH 155) are undergoing their upgrade and are scheduled to finish in this order. HMAS Parramatta (FFH 154) is yet to undergo the process.

The upgrade is being carried out by the Warship Asset Management Agreement Alliance, an alliance of the Commonwealth of Australia, BAE Systems, SAAB Australia and Naval Ship Management Australia.

== Austal ==
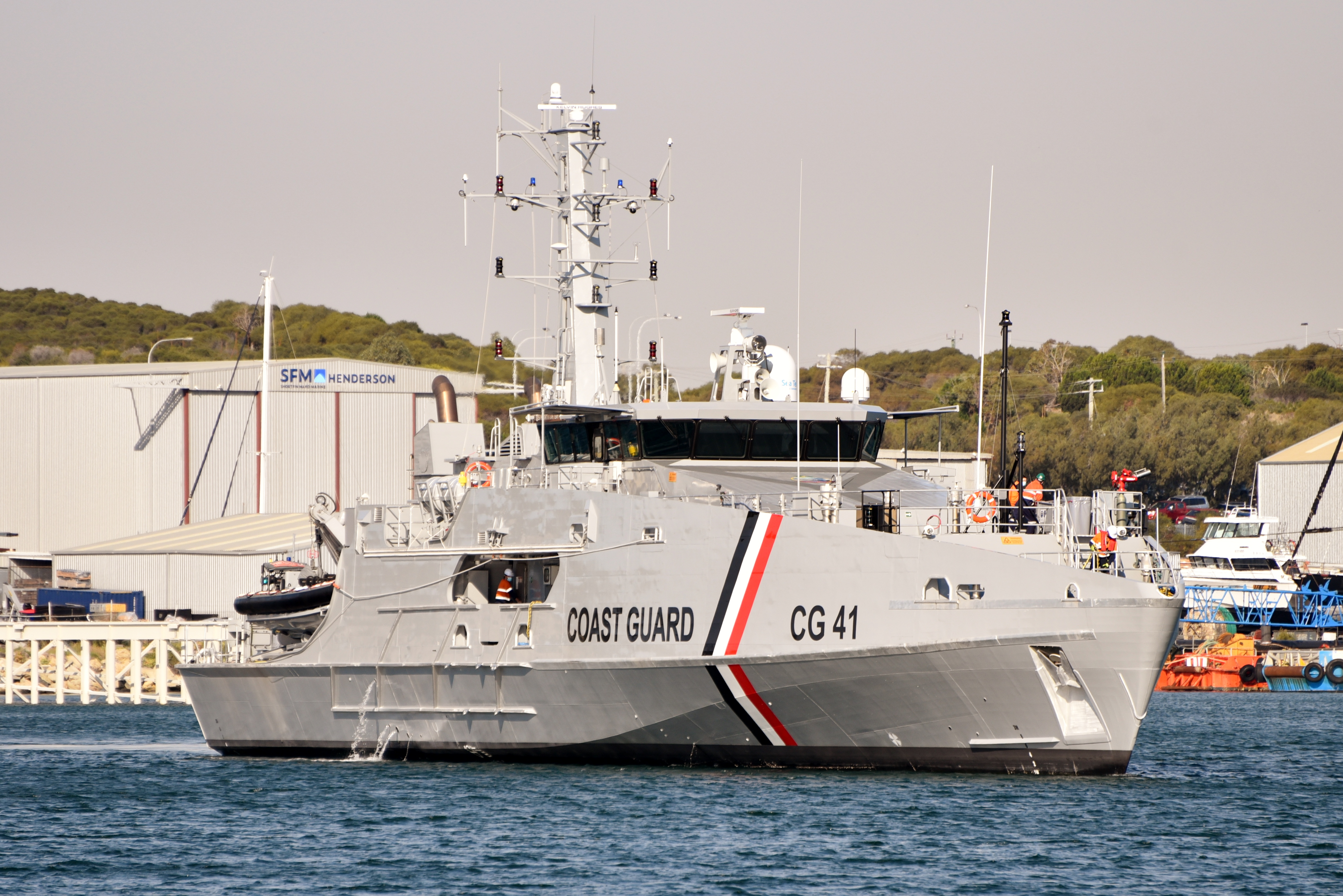
The TTS Port of Spain (CG41) of the Trinidad & Tobago Defence Force in Henderson in May 2021

The Austal shipyard at the Australian Marine Complex built and delivered five Guardian-class patrol boats and Cape-class patrol boats in 2021, with the later two built for the Trinidad & Tobago Defence Force while the former are destined for Pacific Island nations, having been ordered and financed by the Australian Department of Defence. In 2022, Austal is scheduled to deliver a further five Guardian-class patrol boats and four Cape-class patrol boats, the later for the Royal Australian Navy. All up, 21 Guardian-class patrol boats are scheduled to be built at the complex for twelve Pacific Island nations.
