= Hunter-class frigate =

Frigates for the Royal Australian Navy

- Artist's impression of the BAE Systems Type 26 frigate.

Class overview
- Builders: BAE Systems Maritime Australia, Osborne Naval Shipyard
- Operators: Royal Australian Navy
- Preceded by: Anzac-class frigate
- Cost: A$40 billion (2024) to be spent as of 2024 (Note: A$7.25 billion (2024) design and productionisation phase, A$11.1 billion (2024) for the construction of the first 3 ships, A$19.87 billion (2024) to support the construction and training for all 6 ships)
- Built: From 2024
- In service: From 2032
- Planned: 6
- On order: 3
- Building: 1

General characteristics
- Type: Heavy frigate
- Displacement: 8,167 t (8,038 long tons) Stability Lightship; 8,800 t (8,700 long tons) full load displacement
- Length: 151.4 m (496 ft 9 in)
- Beam: 21.4 m (70 ft 3 in)
- Propulsion: CODLOG configuration; 1 × Rolls-Royce MT30 gas turbine; 4 × MTU Type 20V 4000 M53B high-speed diesel generators; 2 × electric motors
- Speed: 27+ knots
- Range: 7,000 nmi (13,000 km; 8,100 mi) in electric motor drive
- Boats & landing craft carried: 1 × 9.5m RHIB in starboard boat bay
- Complement: 180 personnel, with accommodation for 208
- Sensors & processing systems: Command & Control: Aegis combat system; Saab 9LV tactical interface; Sensors: CEA Technologies CEAFAR-2 radar suite; CEAFAR-2L (L-band (IEEE), AESA, GaN, 4D, early-warning radar); CEAFAR-2S ((S-band (IEEE), AESA, multi-function radar (surveillance / initial fire control); CEAMOUNT fire control illuminator; Chess Dynamics SeaEagle FCEO electro-optical system; Sonars: Ultra S2150 hull-mounted sonar; Thales Captas-4 (S2087) towed array and variable depth sonar; Communication systems: Rohde & Schwarz Australia / BAESMA NAVICS integrated communications system; Navigation systems: Anschütz WINBS
- Electronic warfare & decoys: Electronic Warfare; RESM and CESM; 3 × MASS Omnitrap passive IR and RF decoy launchers; 4 × quad Nulka active RF decoy launchers; Anti-torpedo; Surface Ship Torpedo Defence
- Armament: Missiles: 32-cell Mk41 VLS firing: RIM-66 Standard 2; RIM-162 ESSM; BGM-109 Tomahawk; 2 × 4-canister Naval Strike Missile launchers; 2 × 21-cell Mk49 GMLS firing RIM-116C RAM; Torpedoes: 2 × twin torpedo launchers firing MU90 Impact torpedoes; Guns: 1 × 5"/62 caliber Mark 45 mod 4 main gun (127 mm); 2 × 30mm Mk44 Bushmaster II Typhoon Mk-30C RWS
- Aircraft carried: 1 × MH-60R 'Romeo' Seahawk armed with: 2 × Mk 54 MAKO Torpedo; 4 × AGM-114 Hellfire
- Aviation facilities: Large Chinook capable flight deck; Enclosed hangar; Facilities for UAVs
- Notes: Flexible Mission Bay: Rolls-Royce Mission Bay Handling System; 2nd helicopter (MH-60R); 4 × 11m RHIB; 10 × 20 foot containers; UAVs and UUVs

The Hunter-class frigate is an under construction class of six heavy frigates for the Royal Australian Navy.

The genesis of the Future Frigate Program came in 2009, when the Rudd government's Defence White Paper signalled Australia's intent to "acquire a fleet of eight new Future Frigates, which will be larger than the Anzac-class vessels" with a focus on anti-submarine warfare. With an initial tender expected in 2019–20, in 2014 the Abbott government announced that work had been brought forward, funding a preliminary design study focused on integrating a CEAFAR radar and Saab combat system on the hull of the Hobart-class destroyer.

Following a report by the RAND Corporation into options for Australia's naval shipbuilding industry, the government announced an $89 billion naval shipbuilding plan. This plan brought the schedule of the Future Frigate Program forward by three years and announced a "continuous onshore build program to commence in 2020" in South Australia. A competitive evaluation process was announced in April 2016, and a request for tender was released in March 2017 to three contenders: Navantia, Fincantieri, and BAE Systems as part of a competitive evaluation process. The program is expected to cost AU$35 billion.

In June 2018, the BAE Systems Type 26 frigate was selected as the winner.

In June 2024, construction began at the Osborne Naval Shipyard and the first delivery is expected in 2032.

== Project history ==
=== Planning ===
The 2009 Defence White Paper outlined "ambitious plans for the Navy's surface fleet." At its centre was the requirement for twelve Future Submarines and "eight new Future Frigates, which will be larger than the Anzac-class vessels" with a focus on anti-submarine warfare. The accompanying Defence Capability Plan stated that a Government decision would be expected "beyond 2019."

The 2013 Defence White Paper reaffirmed the Future Frigate program and suggested that the replacement of the Anzac-class vessels could be brought forward. In the early 2010s, there was significant concern over the 'valley of death' in Australian shipbuilding following the conclusion of the Hobart-class destroyer program. With concerns both over the cost and management of the Hobart-class program and a union campaign calling for job security at government-owned shipyard ASC, the Abbott government committed over $78 million to preliminary studies to determine whether the Hobart-class hull could be utilised for the Future Frigate.

The 2016 Defence White Paper increased the number of future frigates by one to a total of nine ships.

Against this backdrop, the Abbott government commissioned a study by the RAND Corporation to determine options for the future of naval shipbuilding in Australia. The report found that:

- Australia could sustain a naval ship building industrial base by carefully managing a continuous ship building strategy in the longer–term, with a regular pace of delivering the new ships. But this would need to be premised on reform of the Australian naval ship building industry and significant improvement in productivity.
- Australian naval ship builders can sustain an 18–24 month pace of large ship construction starts if Defence carefully manages its acquisition program and keeps the Future Frigates operational for 25 to 30 years.
- The gap between the completion of the Air Warfare Destroyer project and the start of the Future Frigate cannot be overcome, but the impact could be lessened. The cost of building naval ships in Australia is 30–40 per cent greater than United States benchmarks, and even greater against some other naval ship building nations. Australia is currently one of the most expensive places to build naval vessels. This premium can be reduced by improved productivity.

In response to the RAND report, the Government announced a $89 billion shipbuilding program. This included bringing forward the Future Frigate program with a "continuous onshore build programme to commence in 2020." The budget for the program has been confirmed as "more than $35 billion" and the Government claims it will "directly create over 2,000 jobs." All nine vessels will be constructed in Adelaide, South Australia.

=== Tender process ===
In April 2016 the government announced a competitive evaluation process between Navantia, Fincantieri and BAE Systems for the Future Frigate Program. Additionally, a tender for the combat system was also held between Saab and Lockheed Martin. In October 2017, the government announced that the Aegis combat system and a Saab tactical interface would be used for the class.

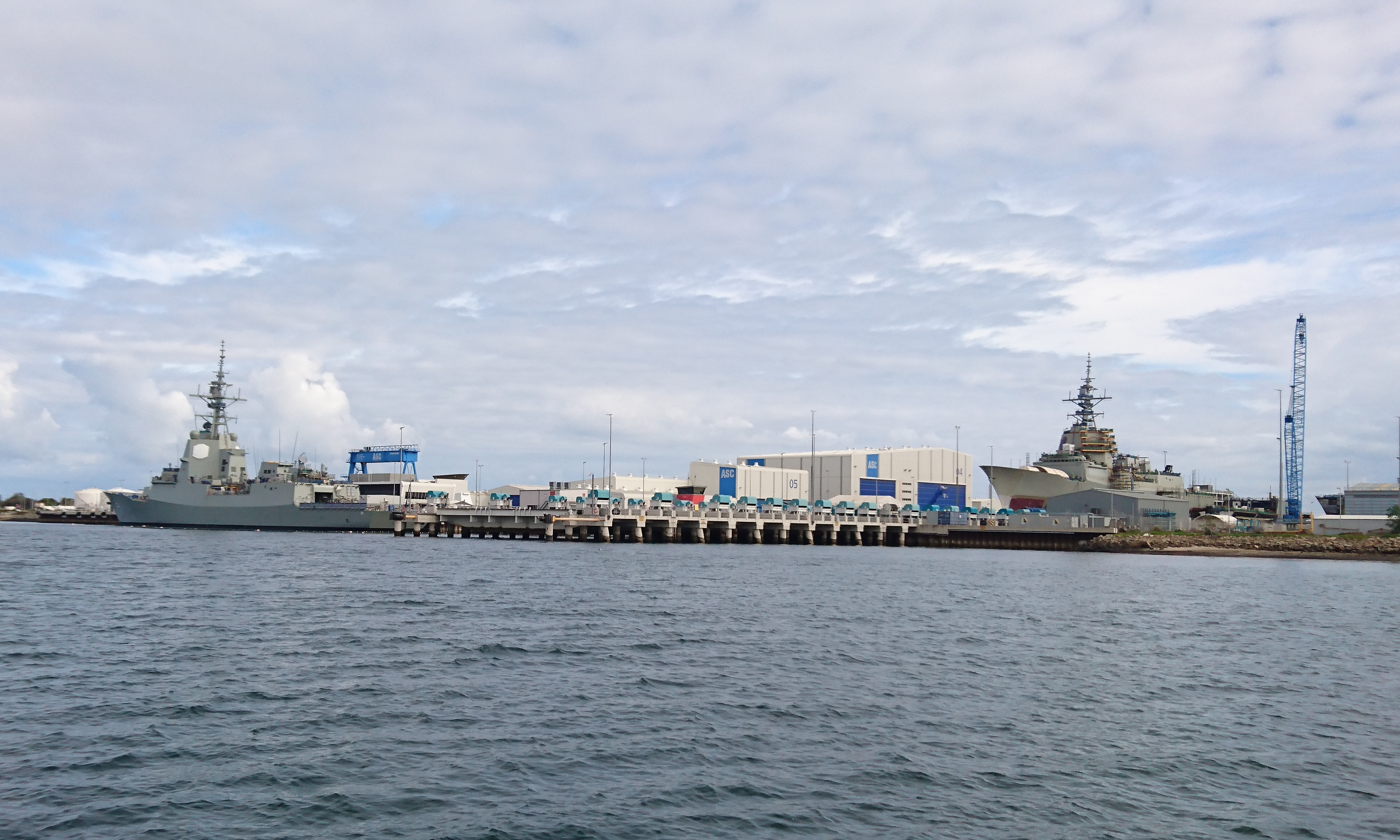
Two Hobart-class destroyers being fitted out / built in South Australia. HMAS Hobart is in the water, HMAS Brisbane is in dock.

==== Navantia (F-5000) ====
Navantia offered an evolution of its F-100 base design, which forms the basis for the Hobart-class destroyers currently being built in Adelaide for the Royal Australian Navy. In 2014, the Australian Government commissioned a study to use the Hobart-class hull which Navantia claims shows it could be adapted to meet the requirements of the Future Frigate program, including integration of the CEAFAR radar and Saab 9LV combat system. Based on this study, a Navantia-designed Future Frigate would have 75 per cent systems commonality with the Hobart-class destroyers. Systems on the Hobart class include a 48-cell Mark 41 vertical launch system, five-inch Mark 45 naval gun, undersea warfare capabilities including a hull mounted sonar and active and passive towed variable depth sonar, as well as the capability to operate a Sikorksy MH-60R "Romeo" Seahawk.

The Hobart-class Air Warfare Destroyer program has attracted criticism for cost and schedule over-runs: by 2015 the program was three years behind schedule and $800 million over budget. In late 2015, Navantia was selected to bring a shipbuilding management team into government-owned shipyard ASC as part of the AWD reform program. Following the reform program, initiated by ASC prior to Navantia management integration, ASC has stated that "when we reach our budget on ship three...we will be as good as the other Aegis yards in the world."

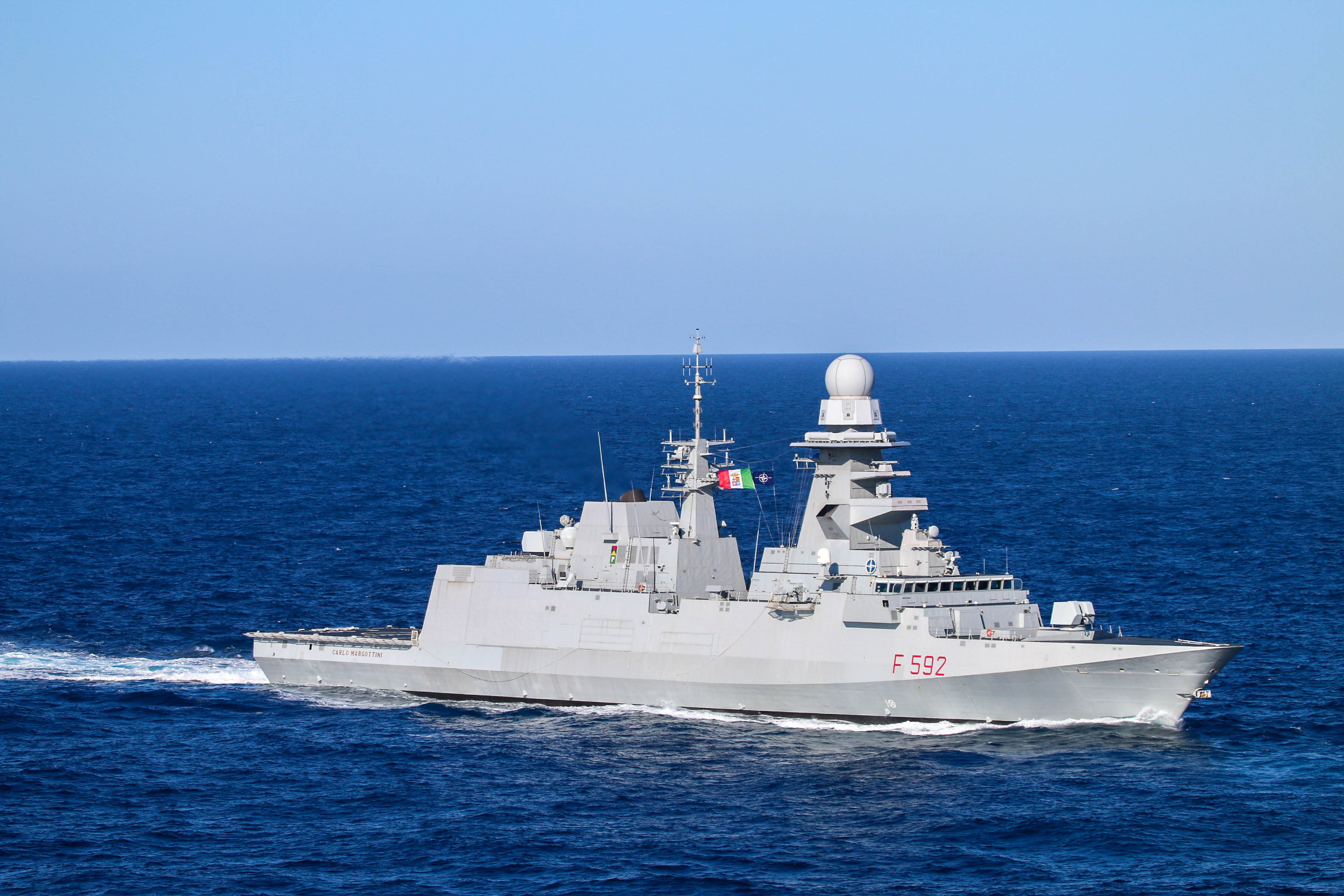
The Italian FREMM Carlo Margottini

==== Fincantieri (Modified FREMM) ====
Fincantieri offered the anti-submarine warfare (ASW) variant of its FREMM frigate (Bergamini class). Fincantieri originally said that the general hull configuration of the Bergamini design will require little or no modification to meet Australian requirements, including the incorporation of the CEAFAR radar, although it has confirmed that some redesign would have been required to incorporate the US Navy Mark 45 five inch naval gun. In 2016, then Australian Defence Minister Christopher Pyne stated that "one of the advantages for this company is that this vessel has been built, it is already in operation. One of the disadvantages is that the company doesn't operate here."

==== BAE Systems (Type 26/Global Combat Ship) ====
BAE Systems offered an export variant of its Type 26. The Type 26 and the smaller, cheaper Type 31 will replace the Royal Navy's Type 22 and Type 23 frigate fleets.

The Type 26 in UK service will be equipped with an advanced anti-submarine warfare (ASW) capability, a 24-cell strike length Mk 41 VLS for long-range strike weapons such as the Tomahawk, a 48-cell vertical launch silo (VLS) for Sea Ceptor anti-air missiles, a 5-inch gun, and is capable of landing a Chinook helicopter on its flight deck.

On 29 June 2018, the Australian Government announced that the Type 26 had been selected to fulfil the Royal Australian Navy's Future Frigate requirement. The Government also announced that the ships were to be built in Australia with Australian-specific modifications and would be named the "Hunter Class" in Australian service. The Government stated the following about the ships:

The Hunter class will provide the Australian Defence Force with the highest levels of lethality and deterrence our major surface combatants need in periods of global uncertainty. The Hunter class will have the capability to conduct a variety of missions independently or as part of a task group, with sufficient range and endurance to operate effectively throughout the region. The frigates will also have the flexibility to support non-warfare roles such as humanitarian assistance and disaster relief. Incorporating the leading edge Australian-developed CEA Phased-Array Radar and the US Navy's Aegis combat management system, with an Australian interface developed by Saab Australia, the Hunter class will be one of the most capable warships in the world.

— Australian Government,

=== 2024 review ===
In February 2024, Deputy Prime Minister and Defence Minister Richard Marles announced major changes in the surface fleet of the Royal Australian Navy with the Hunter class order reduced from nine to six ships. The six planned vessels would continue to replace the outgoing Anzac class which would start being retired immediately and another class of 11 new general-purpose frigates would be selected to supplement the Hobart-class destroyers and Hunter-class frigates.

== Design ==
The Hunter-class frigate will have a 8,800-tonne (8,700-long-ton) full load displacement and will be approximately 150 metres (492 ft 2 in) in length. The vessel will be capable of sailing in excess of 27 knots (50 km/h; 31 mph) and will have a full complement of 180 crew.

A Saab tactical interface with the Aegis combat management system will be used. The vessel will be able to carry one MH-60R ASW helicopter, and has the ability to host a second helicopter or other unmanned systems from its mission bay.

The Royal Australian Navy is reportedly looking to replace Phalanx with the Rolling Airframe Missile system across its fleet, with reports suggesting in May 2026 that the SeaRAM system had also been confirmed for the Hunter Class in place of the Phalanx System.

=== Guided Missile Destroyer Variant ===
During Indo-Pacific 2023, BAE Systems Maritime Australia revealed a version of the Hunter-class frigate with an increased number of VLS cells. This was done by removing the Flexible Mission Bay and elements of its ASW capability (including the towed VDS), and replacing it with a 64 Mk41 VLS module for a total of 96 Mk41 VLS cells making it equal the USN Arleigh Burke-class destroyers. In addition, the number of anti-ship missiles was also increased from 8 to 16 Naval Strike Missiles. The VLS cell count is flexible and 16, 48 or 64 cells could be added depending on the requirement. It was also proposed that should the Royal Australian Navy require it, an additional 32 VLS cells could be added in place of the 5 inch Mk45 main gun for a total of 128 VLS cells. BAE Systems Australia claims that this variant retains 85% commonality with the original Hunter-class design. They also claim that there would be a minimal impact on cost and negligible impact on the schedule of the build so long as the modification to the design commenced with Batch II rather than Batch I vessels.

== Construction ==
The ships will be built by BAE Systems Australia at Osborne Naval Shipyard. First steel was cut on prototype blocks in December 2021. This was followed in June 2024 with first steel being cut, signalling the start of construction.

As of 2022, the Hunter-class frigate project was running four years behind schedule and the cost of the ships was $15 billion higher than originally expected. These issues led the acquisition to be added to the Defence 'Projects of Concern' list.

First steel was officially cut for the program on 21 June 2024, and on the same day, the contract was signed for the first batch of three Hunter-class frigates. The first-in-class ship, HMAS Hunter is expected to be commissioned in 2032. However, 6 Schedule Protection Blocks (prototype blocks intended to be outfitted and used on the first ship to recover schedule slippage) were already in various stages of construction with some having finished construction and waiting to be outfitted.

In October 2025, BAE Systems Australia celebrated the milestone of having more than half of future HMAS Hunter under construction 15 months after steel cut.

== Ships ==
=== List of ships ===
Builder	Order (date)	Status	Name	No.	Steel cut	Laid down	Launched	Comm.	Namesake	Notes
BAE Systems Maritime Australia, Osborne Naval Shipyard, Adelaide	Batch 1; 14 Dec 2018	Under construction	HMAS Hunter	–	21 Jun 2024	24 Aug 2026	–	2032	Hunter region of New South Wales	
BAE Systems Maritime Australia, Osborne Naval Shipyard, Adelaide	Batch 1; 14 Dec 2018	On order	HMAS Flinders	–	–	–	–	–	Flinders Ranges region of South Australia	
BAE Systems Maritime Australia, Osborne Naval Shipyard, Adelaide	Batch 1; 14 Dec 2018	On order	HMAS Tasman	–	–	–	–	–	Tasman Peninsula region of Tasmania	
BAE Systems Maritime Australia, Osborne Naval Shipyard, Adelaide	Batch 2 No order yet	Planned	–	–	–	–	–	–		
BAE Systems Maritime Australia, Osborne Naval Shipyard, Adelaide	Batch 2 No order yet	Planned	–	–	–	–	–	–		
BAE Systems Maritime Australia, Osborne Naval Shipyard, Adelaide	Batch 2 No order yet	Planned	–	–	–	–	–	–		

Planned / expected dates

== See also ==
- Type 26 frigate
- River-class destroyer (2034)
- F110-class frigate
- Australian general purpose frigate program
