= HMAS Flinders (FFG) =

Hunter-class frigate

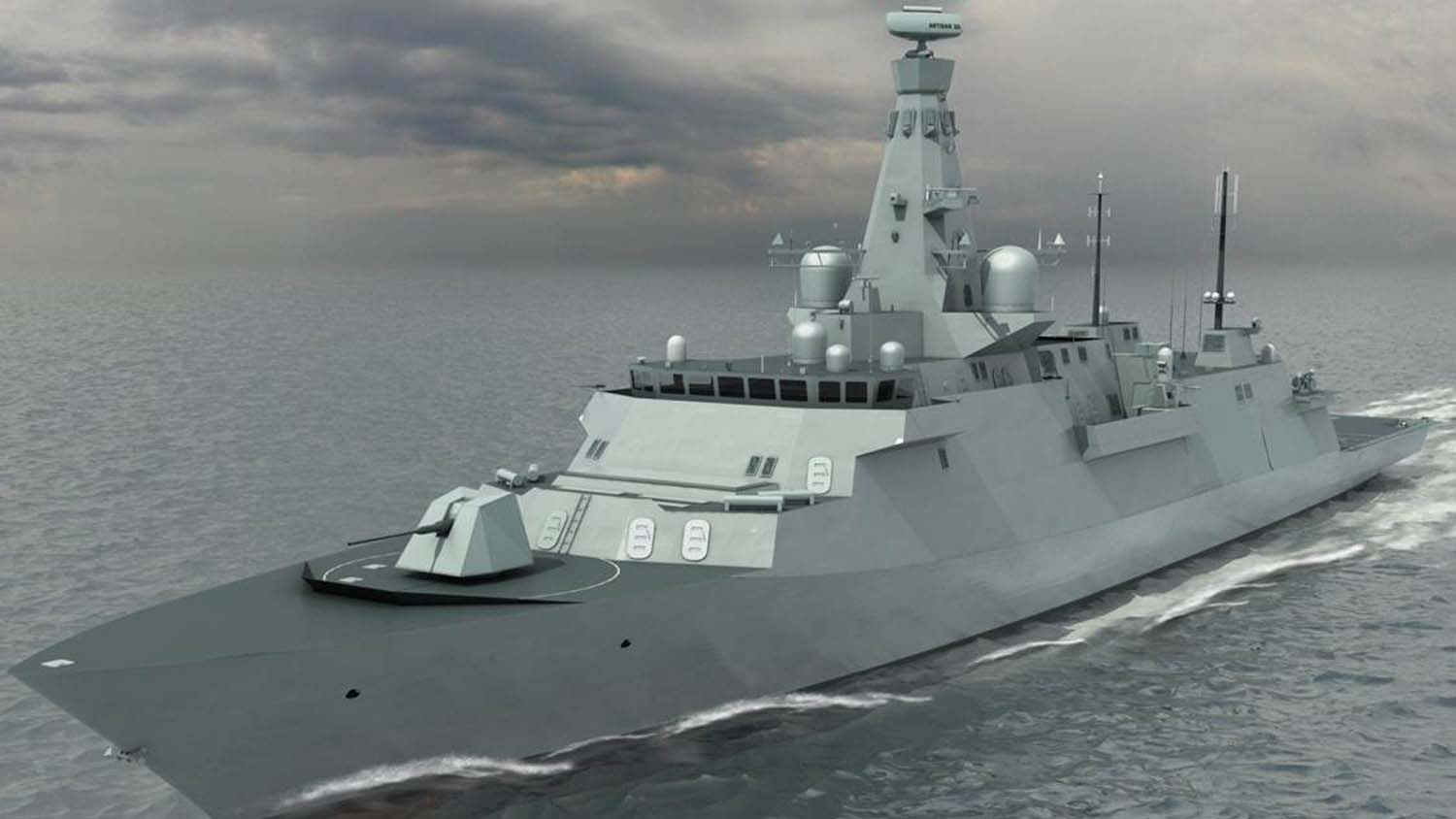
- Type 26 frigate

History

Australia
- Name: Flinders
- Namesake: Matthew Flinders
- Ordered: 21 June 2024
- Builder: BAE Systems Australia, Osborne
- Cost: AU$3.9 billion
- Identification: Pennant number:
- Status: Ordered

General characteristics
- Type: Hunter-class frigate
- Displacement: 8,800 t (8,700 long tons; 9,700 short tons) full load displacement
- Length: 151.4 m (497 ft)
- Beam: 21.4 m (70 ft)
- Propulsion: CODLOG configuration; 1 × Rolls-Royce MT30 gas turbine; 4 × MTU Type 20V 4000 M53B high-speed diesel generators; 2 × electric motors
- Speed: 27+ knots
- Range: 7,000 nautical miles (13,000 km; 8,100 mi) in electric motor drive
- Complement: 180 personnel, with accommodation for 208
- Sensors & processing systems: Command & Control: Aegis combat system; Saab 9LV tactical interface; Surveillance & Weapon Sensors: CEA Technologies CEAFAR2 phased array radar; CEAFAR-L L-band long range surveillance radar; CEAFAR-S S-band multi-function radar; CEAMOUNT fire control illuminator; Underwater Warfare Systems; Ultra S2150 hull-mounted sonar; Thales Sonar 2087 towed array and variable depth sonar
- Electronic warfare & decoys: Nulka decoy launchers
- Armament: Missiles: 2 x 4-canister advanced anti-ship missiles; 32 Mark 41 Vertical Launch System firing: RIM-66 Standard 2; RIM-162 ESSM; Torpedoes: MU90 Impact torpedoes; Guns: 1 × 5-inch 54 calibre Mark 45 Mod 4 dual purpose gun; 2 × 30mm short-range gun systems; 2 × 20mm Phalanx CIWS
- Aircraft carried: 1 × MH-60R ‘Romeo’ Seahawk armed with: 2 × Mk 54 MAKO Torpedo; 4 × AGM-114 Hellfire
- Aviation facilities: Large Chinook capable flight deck; Enclosed hangar; Facilities for UAVs
- Notes: Flexible Mission Bay: Rolls-Royce Mission Bay Handling System; 2nd helicopter (MH-60R); 4 x 11m RHIB; 10 x 20 foot containers; UAVs and UUVs

HMAS Flinders (FFG) is the second ship of the Hunter-class frigate of the Royal Australian Navy.

== Development and design ==
The Hunter-class frigate is a future class of frigates for the Royal Australian Navy (RAN) to replace the Anzac-class. Construction is expected to begin in 2020, with the first of nine vessels to enter service in the late 2020s. The Program is expected to cost AU$35 billion and a request for tender was released in March 2017 to three contenders: Navantia, Fincantieri, and BAE Systems as part of a competitive evaluation process.

The Hunter-class frigate will be an Australian variation of the Type 26 class frigate that is to be operated by the Royal Navy from the mid-2020s. The class will have a 8,800-tonne (8,700-long-ton; 9,700-short-ton) full load displacement and will be approximately 150 metres (490 ft) in length. The vessel will be capable of sailing in excess of 27 knots (50 km/h; 31 mph) and will have a full complement of 180 crew.

== Construction and career ==
Flinders was ordered on 30 June 2018 (that is, the BAE Systems proposal for new Australian frigates was accepted then) and named after Captain Matthew Flinders. She will be built by BAE Systems Australia in Osborne. Contract was signed on 21 June 2024.
