= Raytheon Australia =

- Industry: Defence Systems
- Founded: 1999; 27 years ago
- Headquarters: Canberra, Australia
- Revenue: AU$735.5 million (2012)
- Number of employees: 1500
- Parent: Raytheon

Raytheon Australia is the Australian arm of Raytheon Technologies. It was established in 1999 and has grown to become the largest US owned defence contractor operating in Australia. In 2012 Raytheon Australia recorded a turnover of $735.5 million. In 2015, Raytheon Australian was ranked fourth in Australian Defence Magazine's "Top 40 Defence Contractors" behind Thales Australia, ASC and BAE Systems Australia. As of 2016, the company's Managing Director is Michael Ward until 30 May 2024.

== Combat systems integration ==
The company's combat systems integration arm has been a key contributor to Australia's Air Warfare Destroyer project. The arm employs 500 combat systems professionals of 1500 total staff. Raytheon Australia provides "combat system design, development, integration and test as well as complex project management, integrated logistics support and technical governance." Raytheon's combat systems workforce is concentrated at Techport, Adelaide with additional combat systems centres at Macquarie Park, Sydney and Henderson, south of Perth where work is undertaken on Collins-class submarines.

In 2016, the company opened a new Naval and Integration Headquarters in Adelaide.

== Security Solutions ==
In January 2010, Raytheon Australia bought assets previously owned by Compucat Research Pty. Ltd., in order "to enhance Raytheon's ability to meet the future information security needs of the Australian intelligence community."

The acquisition included intellectual property, staff and a secure location in Canberra adjacent to two universities where cyber security training is provided. In July 2010, Raytheon Australia launched its Security Solutions business unit. General Manager of Security Solutions, Andrew Pyke, said in an interview with Momentum that the company had seized the opportunity after market research had identified future growth in intelligence markets. He said "This has been something that Michael Ward and Gerard Foley, in particular, have been working on for several years as part of our company strategy, with strong support from Lynn Dugle and the Raytheon Intelligence and Information Systems team in the US."

At its formation, Security Solutions' main market was defined as the civil and defence agencies of the Australian Intelligence Community (AIC) and the intelligence community of Allied nations. Five key areas were identified for Security Solutions to capitalise upon: cybersecurity, information and communications technology (ICT), intelligence, surveillance and reconnaissance (ISR), intelligence operations support and geospatial solutions.

Pyke said the unit would focus on building government-grade solutions while partnering with other companies better suited to commercial markets. He described the business unit as "one of major importance in keeping our nation and allies safe through use of our leading edge technology."

== Woomera test range ==
As of 2016, Raytheon Australia is upgrading the Woomera Test Range in partnership with the Australian Defence Force and several Australian contractors including CEA Technologies, Daronmont Technologies and Cirrus Technologies. Once complete, the project is expected to deliver "the world’s largest, and most advanced overland test range." The range will be used to test F-35 Joint Strike Fighters and support the United States Armed Forces.

== Acquisitions ==
- 1999 - Aerospace Technical Services, to expand its aeronautical engineering and flight test capabilities
- 2000 - Boeing Naval Systems
- 2003 - Honeywell Aerospace and Defence Services
- 2010 - Business assets previously owned by Compucat Research Pty. Ltd.

== Key contracts ==
- 2001 - Electronic Warfare Training Services contract for the Royal Australian Navy
- 2002 - Collins Submarine Replacement Combat Systems
- 2005 - Avionics Workshop
- 2007 - Qantas Defence Services Avionics Business Unit contract
- 2007 - Air Warfare Destroyer Combat System Systems Engineer
- 2007 - Navy Aviation Retention and Motivation Initiative (followed by a new four-year contract in 2011)
- 2011 - provision of "tactical data radios as the first phase in providing the Australian Defence Force with the land elements of an integrated battlespace communications system"
- 2011 - provision of operations, maintenance and support services for the Naval Communications Station Harold E Holt in Exmouth, WA.

== Alliances ==
In June 2016, Raytheon Australia established a strategic alliance with Australia's Defence Science and Technology Group. The alliance allows for a research interaction, exchange of information, staff secondments and access to the other parties' facilities and equipment.

== Locations ==
Raytheon Australia maintains presences at sixteen locations around Australia, including all mainland capital cities. The company is headquartered in Canberra. It has facilities at RAAF bases at Edinburgh (South Australia), Amberley (Queensland) and Tindal (Northern Territory) and another facility at Naval Communication Station - Harold E. Holt in Exmouth, Western Australia. In New South Wales, Raytheon Australia is located at Macquarie Park, Nowra and Williamtown. In South Australia it has facilities at Osborne, Techport and Mawson Lakes. Additional facilities exist at Murarrie (Queensland), Port Melbourne (Victoria) and Henderson (Western Australia).

== Sanctions ==
Raytheon Australia was sanctioned by the Chinese government on 27 December 2024 due to arm sales to Taiwan.
