= BAE Systems Maritime Australia =

Shipbuilding company in Australia

- Company type: Subsidiary
- Industry: Shipbuilding
- Headquarters: Osborne, Adelaide, South Australia, Australia
- Products: Naval vessels
- Parent: BAE Systems Australia (for duration of contract)

BAE Systems Maritime Australia, formerly known as ASC Shipbuilding when it was the shipbuilding division of ASC Pty Ltd, is a subsidiary of BAE Systems Australia and will remain a subsidiary for the duration of the contract to build the Hunter class frigates. It was structurally separated from ASC Pty Ltd in December 2018 and became a subsidiary of BAE Systems Australia. In 2021, it was renamed to BAE Systems Maritime Australia.

== History ==
ASC Shipbuilding had been one of the wholly owned subsidiary companies owned by ASC Pty Ltd, and had been involved in the construction of the Air Warfare Destroyer and Offshore Patrol Vessel projects under ASC's lead role.

To establish ASC Shipbuilding a number of assets and obligations were transferred from ASC Group. These included a new company named ASC OPV Shipbuilder Pty Ltd which has direct responsibility for completing the Offshore Patrol Vessel contract to build the first two Arafura-class ships under licence from Luerssen Australia. Some employees were moved between the various companies, along with their entitlements. Two subsidiaries of ASC Shipbuilding (ASC AWD Shipbuilder and ASC Modules) were transferred out of ASC Shipbuilding to the parent group. Finally, ASC Shipbuilding was removed from ASC Group to direct ownership by the Commonwealth by way of an in specie dividend.

After BAE Systems Australia won the contract to build Hunter class frigates for the Royal Australian Navy at ASC's shipyard, ASC Shipbuilding was structurally separated from the rest of ASC Pty Ltd and transferred to BAE Systems Australia in December 2018. ASC Pty Ltd retained responsibility for completion of the Air Warfare Destroyer and Offshore Patrol Vessel contracts. At the completion of the contract, the control of ASC Shipbuilding will be returned to the Commonwealth of Australia. Under its new ownership, ASC Shipbuilding expanded its scope from only assembling modules for naval ships to undertaking full design and construction work. Following the selection of four Australian companies to help fast track manufacturing processes to support the Hunter Class Frigate Program, ASC Shipbuilding, was renamed as BAE Systems Maritime Australia.

== Operations ==
ASC Shipbuilding occupies the ASC South site of the Osborne Naval Shipyards. It is the responsible entity for building the Hunter class frigates. It also provides contract workforce to its neighbour and former parent ASC Pty Ltd to complete the Hobart-class Air Warfare Destroyer (AWD) and Arafura-class offshore patrol vessels (OPV) programs.

ASC Shipbuilding established a new collaboration with Flinders University in 2019 to establish a test and trial laboratory for evaluating and developing technology for use in building the Hunter-class frigates.

At the end of the building program for the Hunter-class frigates, 100% ownership of ASC Shipbuilding will return to the Commonwealth of Australia, including the intellectual property developed during the design and construction. The Commonwealth retains a sovereign share during the build, which also provides rights in relation to decisions with national security or strategic implications during the build.

== Vessels Built ==
- Hobart-class destroyers – 3 ships (unit blocks and final block consolidation)
- Arafura-class offshore patrol vessels – 2 ships
- Hunter-class frigates – 6 ships (under construction)
