= Osborne Naval Shipyard =

Shipbuilding facility in South Australia

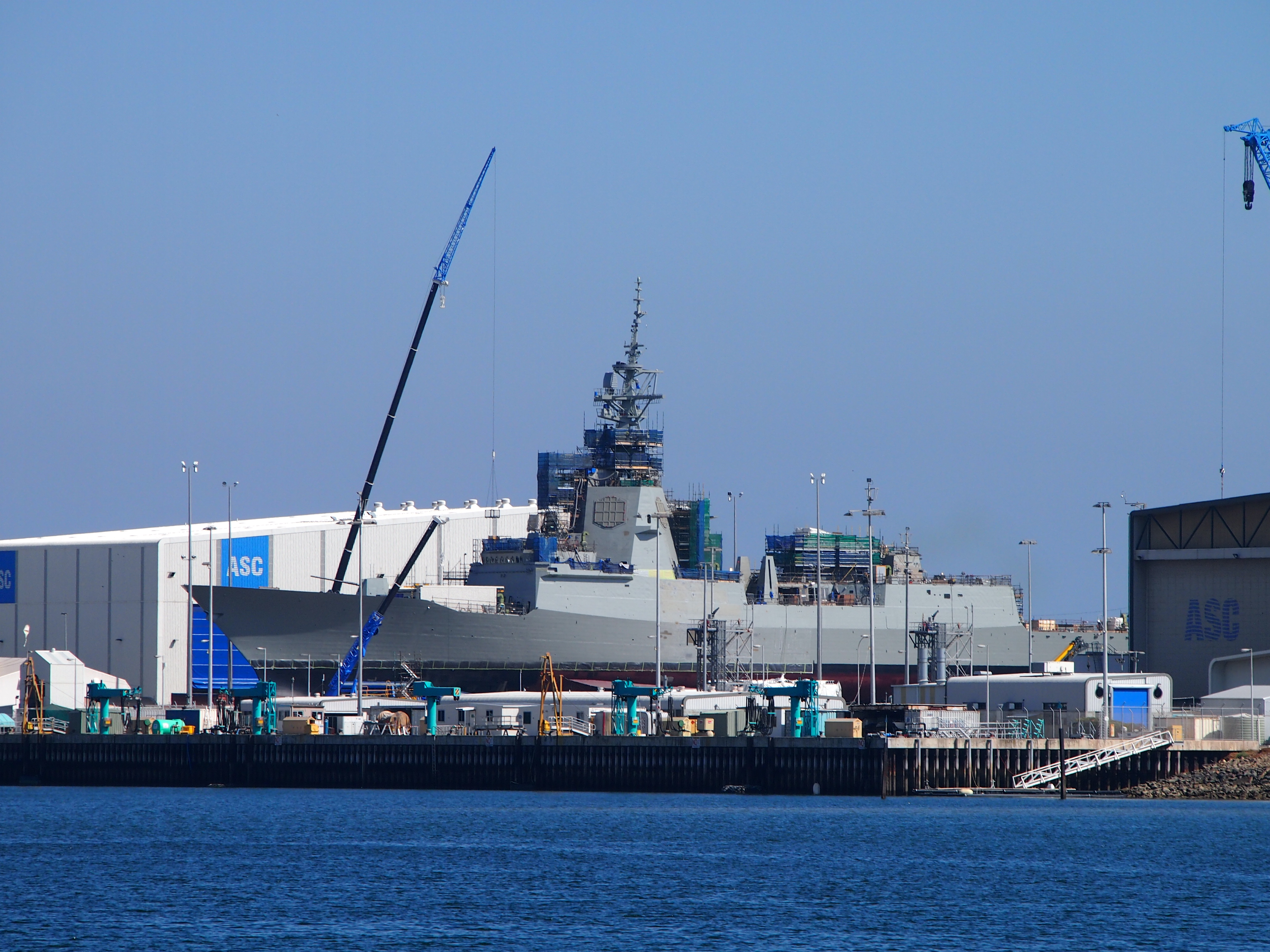
- View of shipyard from the Port River

- Location within Australia Location within South Australia Location within Greater Adelaide
- Location: Osborne, Adelaide
- Coordinates: 34.785°S 138.511°E
- Industry: Naval Shipbuilding
- Products: Royal Australian Navy ships
- Owner: Australian Naval Infrastructure (ANI)

The Osborne Naval Shipyard is a Royal Australian Navy multi-user ship construction facility on the Lefevre Peninsula at Osborne, South Australia. It is the most advanced shipbuilding facility in both Australia and the Southern Hemisphere, and has produced several classes of major surface combatants and submerged vessels, such as destroyers, frigates, patrol boats and submarines for the Royal Australian Navy fleet.

The facility was established by the direction of the Australian government in 1987 for the Australian Submarine Corporation in order to construct the six Collins-class submarines. Since then, it has expanded significantly, incorporating a vast array of technology and facilities as the main supplier of naval vessels for the RAN. The Osborne Naval Shipyard is widely regarded as one of the most technologically advanced naval shipbuilding facilities in the world, with "digital twin" ship building methods. The shipyard will be the location for the construction of the SSN-AUKUS submarines from the 2030s onwards, as the primary manufacturing hub of the trilateral AUKUS security pact. The facility currently administers Collins-class submarine full-cycle docking and 'Life of Type' extension program and the Hunter-class frigate program.

As of 2026, $30 Billion AUD worth of upgrades and extensions of the facility are in progress in order to triple the size of the shipyard to accommodate SSN-AUKUS submarine construction activities. Once completed, the facility will be one of only a handful across the world which will have the capacity to produce large surface combatant vessels and nuclear-powered submarines simultaneously. According to preliminary plans for the new shipyard, Osborne will receive a third shiplift and potentially a graving dock to the north of the site for construction and maintenance of SSN-AUKUS submarines.

== Facilities ==
The ship building precinct includes a number of discrete facilities, as it has grown over the time it has existed.

The Government of South Australia built a "common user facility" that includes a wharf and Shiplift constructed between 2007 and 2010, known as Techport Australia. It was designed by Aurecon and constructed by McConnell Dowell and Built Environs. Techport was sold by the state government to the Federal Government in 2017 for A$230 million.

The shiplift was supplied by Rolls-Royce and is 156 metres (512 ft) long and 34 metres (112 ft) wide. It can lift 9,300 tonnes (9,200 long tons; 10,300 short tons) from a water depth of 18 metres (59 ft). It is designed to allow for future expansion to 210 metres (690 ft) length and lifting capacity of 20,000 tonnes (20,000 long tons; 22,000 short tons).

Between 2017 and 2020, an extension was built behind Osborne South to construct the Hunter-class frigates. The largest building in the new complex is known as Building 22, and is 80 metres (260 ft) high with a footprint of 170 by 50 metres (560 ft × 160 ft), large enough for assembly of two frigates other than the upper superstructure. Parts of Osborne South were designed by Odense Maritime Technologies.

In September 2021, the Morrison government scrapped the French multi-billion-dollar deal to build the Attack-class submarines, instead signing a monumental agreement with the United Kingdom and the United States to build 8 SSN-AUKUS submarines at the Osborne Naval Shipyard Adelaide for the Royal Australian Navy. The first submarine is expected in the early 2040s.

In November 2023, the Australian government performed a land swap with the state government, trading land on three nearby military sites for 60 acres of land around Osborne Naval Shipyard for the construction of the nuclear submarine shipyard facilities (Osborne North) and a workforce skills training centre, the federal government expect spades in the ground for the construction of site access roads and utilities diversions before the end of 2023.

== Tenants ==
- Saab Kockums
- ASC Pty Ltd
- BAE Systems Australia

== Shipyard Activity ==
The list of ships constructed or ordered from the Osborne facility include:

- 6 Collins-class submarine
- 3 Hobart-class destroyer
- 2 Arafura-class offshore patrol vessel
- 6 Hunter-class frigate (construction commenced in 2024 with first delivery in 2031)
- 8 SSN-AUKUS submarines (commencing 2030's for delivery in 2040s)
