= 2016 Defence White Paper =

- Published front cover
- Presented: 24 February 2016
- Commissioned by: Department of Defence
- Signatories: Senator The Hon. Marise Payne, Minister for Defence

The 2016 Defence White Paper is a white paper published by the Australian Department of Defence outlining a strategic plan for the Australian Defence Force (ADF) over the following decade. The paper describes the need for improvement in the capabilities of the ADF, and includes a commitment to A$195 billion in spending on new equipment and resources, as well as plans for restructure and review of the Royal Australian Navy, the Royal Australian Air Force and the Australian Army.

== Background ==
The first Defence White Paper was published in 1976 under the Whitlam government, and new papers were published in 1987, 1994, 2000, 2003, 2009 and 2013.

The Department of Defence issued a press release on 4 April 2014 stating that it had been instructed to develop a new white paper.

== Recommendations ==
=== Strategic objectives ===
The paper outlines three "Strategic Defence Interests" as fundamentals for further planning:

1. A "secure, resilient Australia" – the capability to "deter, deny and defeat" an attack on Australian territory by a foreign military power. A key part of this objective is Australia's military alliance with the United States.
2. A "secure nearer region" – including security partnerships with the governments and militaries of Papua New Guinea, Timor Leste, and other Pacific island nations.
3. A "stable Indo-Pacific region and rules based global order" – primarily, addressing rising tensions in the Asia-Pacific region, including the increased military power of the People's Republic of China.

=== Acquisitions ===
The paper sets out a number of specific intended purchases of materiel and weaponry over the following 20 years, though some had been announced prior to the release of the paper. These include:

- 12 new submarines, described as "regionally superior" by Prime Minister Malcolm Turnbull, to replace the Collins class submarines
- 8 Boeing P-8 Poseidon maritime surveillance aircraft, and a further 7 aircraft of similar design
- 12 surface vessels, including 3 Hobart-class destroyers and 9 frigates of a new design
- 12 "offshore patrol vessels" to replace the Armidale-class patrol boats
- 7 MQ-4C Triton surveillance unmanned aerial vehicles
- 72 F-35A Lightning II Joint Strike Fighters
- A new ground-based radar system
- 1,100 Hawkei infantry mobility vehicles, and later a replacement for the Bushmaster IMV
- A new rocket artillery system with a range of up to 300 kilometres (190 mi)
- 2 additional KC-30A air-to-air refuelling aircraft
- 3 CH-47 Chinook helicopters
- 2 new replenishment vessels
