= Australian Industry Development Corporation =

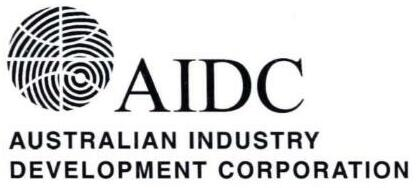
- Formation: 1970
- Type: Investment company State-owned enterprise
- Headquarters: Canberra, Australia
- Owner: Government of Australia (100% until 1989)

The Australian Industry Development Corporation (AIDC) was an investment company and state-owned enterprise of the Australian Government for most of its existence. It was established by the Gorton government in 1971 as a pet project of deputy prime minister John McEwen, tasked with helping develop Australia's resources industry. The corporation later functioned as more of a general investment bank and was partially privatised by the Hawke government in 1989. Most of its operations were spun off into AIDC Limited, which listed on the Australian Securities Exchange (ASX), and its assets were progressively sold down by the Keating and Howard governments in the 1990s.

== Creation ==
In 1967, during the Holt government, trade and industry minister John McEwen put forward a cabinet proposal for a state-owned Industry Development Corporation (IDC) that would provide financial support for Australia's resources industry. McEwen, an economic nationalist concerned about foreign ownership, believed that Australia's existing banks had failed to properly support the resources sector, forcing companies to turn to overseas lenders and ultimately leading to foreign control over Australia's natural resources. McEwen and his protectionist Department of Trade & Industry came into conflict with the more economically liberal Treasury Department, with cabinet eventually approving a competing proposal put forward by treasurer William McMahon for a smaller-scale Resources Development Bank (RDB).

In February 1969, McEwen wrote to Harold Holt's successor John Gorton proposing that his original IDC proposal be revived. Gorton, an economic nationalist like McEwen, agreed to his suggestion and the pair put forward a joint cabinet proposal in January 1970 for an IDC that would borrow funds overseas and on-lend them to companies in the resources and manufacturing industries. It was distinguished from the RDB in that it would not be solely a lending institution but would take equity stakes and become an active investor in projects. Cabinet approved the proposal only after several weeks of debate, with a number of ministers regarding it as socialistic.

== Operations ==
In 1979, the Canberra Times reported that the AIDC had "drifted away from its original concept, which was to replace overseas equity capital with loan capital, and towards becoming yet another merchant banking operation". It reported gross profit of $10.4 million for the previous year (equivalent to $55.3 million in 2022) and total assets of $403.6 million (equivalent to $2.1 billion in 2022). However, in 1980 a House of Representatives committee led by Liberal MP Kevin Cairns found that the AIDC had lost $25 million (equivalent to $133 million in 2022) between 1970 and 1979.

In the early 1980s the AIDC reportedly played a "leading role" in securing funding for the $1.1 billion (equivalent to $4.9 billion in 2022) expansion of the North West Shelf Venture. It also acquired stakes in Richard Pratt's box manufacturing company Visy, Alcan's Kurri Kurri aluminium smelter, and the Kewarra Beach Resort in Cairns. In 1986, the AIDC was Australia's 19th-largest financial institution, with gross assets of $2.5 billion (equivalent to $7.4 billion in 2022), and the seventh-largest government-owned institution after the Commonwealth Bank, four state banks, and New South Wales State Super. Following the Black Monday stock crash of 1987, the AIDC was left with a number of bad loans, but unlike traditional banks had no buffer of household mortgages to fall back on.

AIDC Limited obtained a 10 percent stake in telecommunications provider Optus in 1992. In the following year, the company reportedly had "significant exposure to the commercial property sector" and had lost significant sums from the failure of investments, including Perth-based property developers Tower Corp and Dayton group, plastics group Sabco and hardware retailer McEwans Holdings.

== Privatisation ==
In mid-1989, the Hawke government partially privatised the AIDC, with its loan and investment operations spun off into AIDC Limited, a publicly listed company. The initial public offer was for 19 percent of the new entity, with the AIDC holding the remaining share capital. In 1993, the Keating government announced it would sell down the government's stake to 51 percent. However, in 1995 the government conducted a share buyback of all publicly held shares in order to smooth the way for full privatisation.

The Coalition committed to the full privatisation of the AIDC prior to the 1996 federal election. The Howard government's AIDC Act 1997 allowed for the sale of AIDC Limited and the winding-up of its parent entity, with the Australian Democrats introducing a successful amendment to require that the AIDC's stake in the Australian Submarine Corporation be retained by the government. The majority of AIDC's assets were sold to Babcock & Brown and Union Bank of Switzerland in 1997, although certain key assets were retained for individual sale, including AIDC's stakes in the Australian Submarine Corporation and Optus.

== See also ==
- Future Fund
