= ASC Pty Ltd =

Australian shipbuilder

- Formerly: Australian Submarine Corporation
- Industry: Shipbuilding
- Founded: 1985
- Founder: Kockums; Chicago Bridge & Iron; Wormald International; Australian Industry Development Corporation
- Headquarters: Osborne Naval Shipyard, South Australia
- Key people: Bruce Carter (Chairman); Stuart Whitley (CEO)
- Products: Naval Vessels
- Revenue: $977 million (2025)
- Net income: $16 million (2025)
- Owner: Government of Australia
- Number of employees: 2,600 (2025)
- Website: www.asc.com.au

ASC Pty Ltd, formerly the Australian Submarine Corporation, is an Australian government business enterprise involved with Australian naval shipbuilding, headquartered at the Osborne Naval Shipyard in South Australia. It is notable for building the Collins-class submarines and Hobart-class destroyers for the Royal Australian Navy.

== History ==
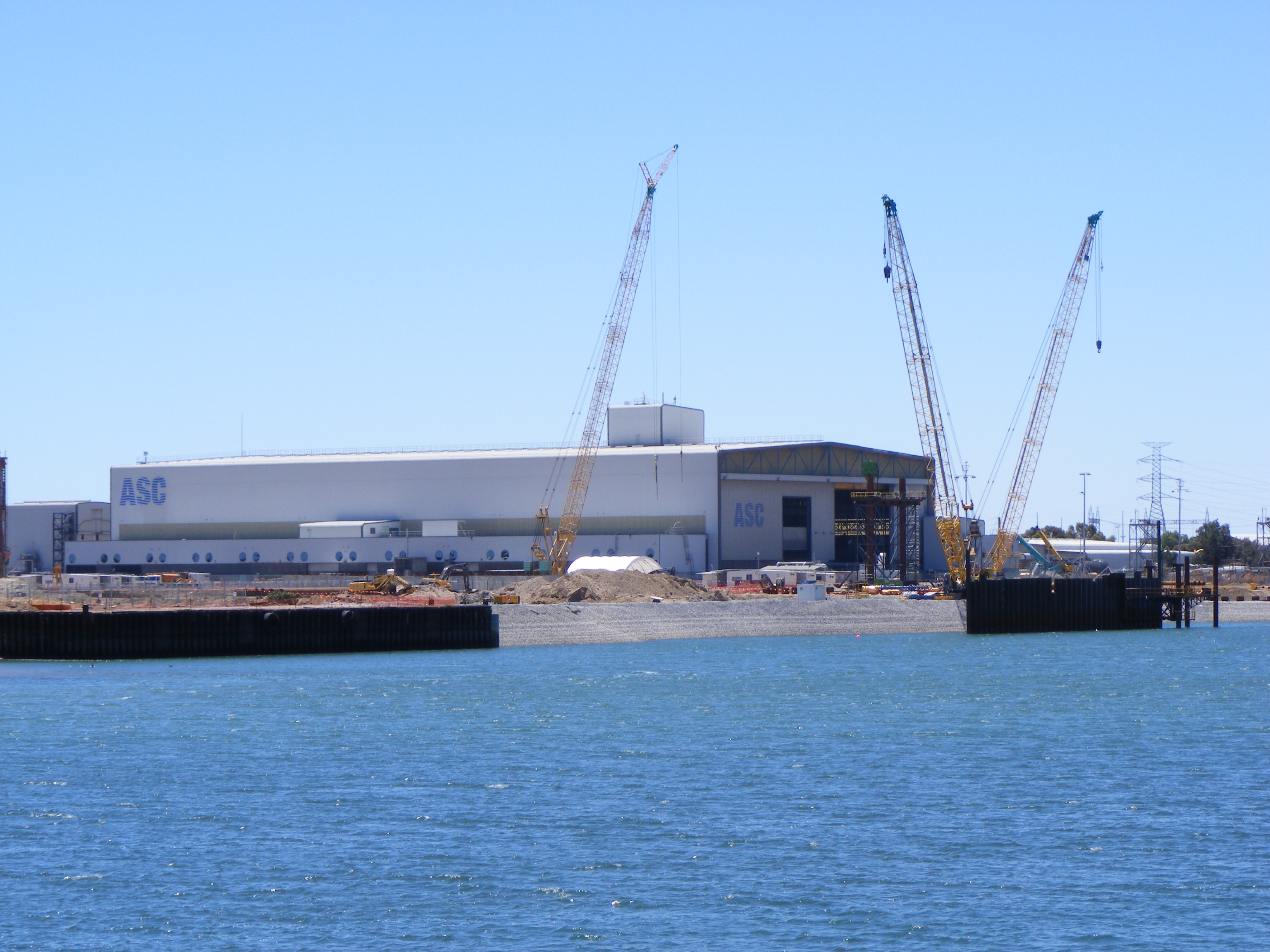
The ASC construction facility on the Port River

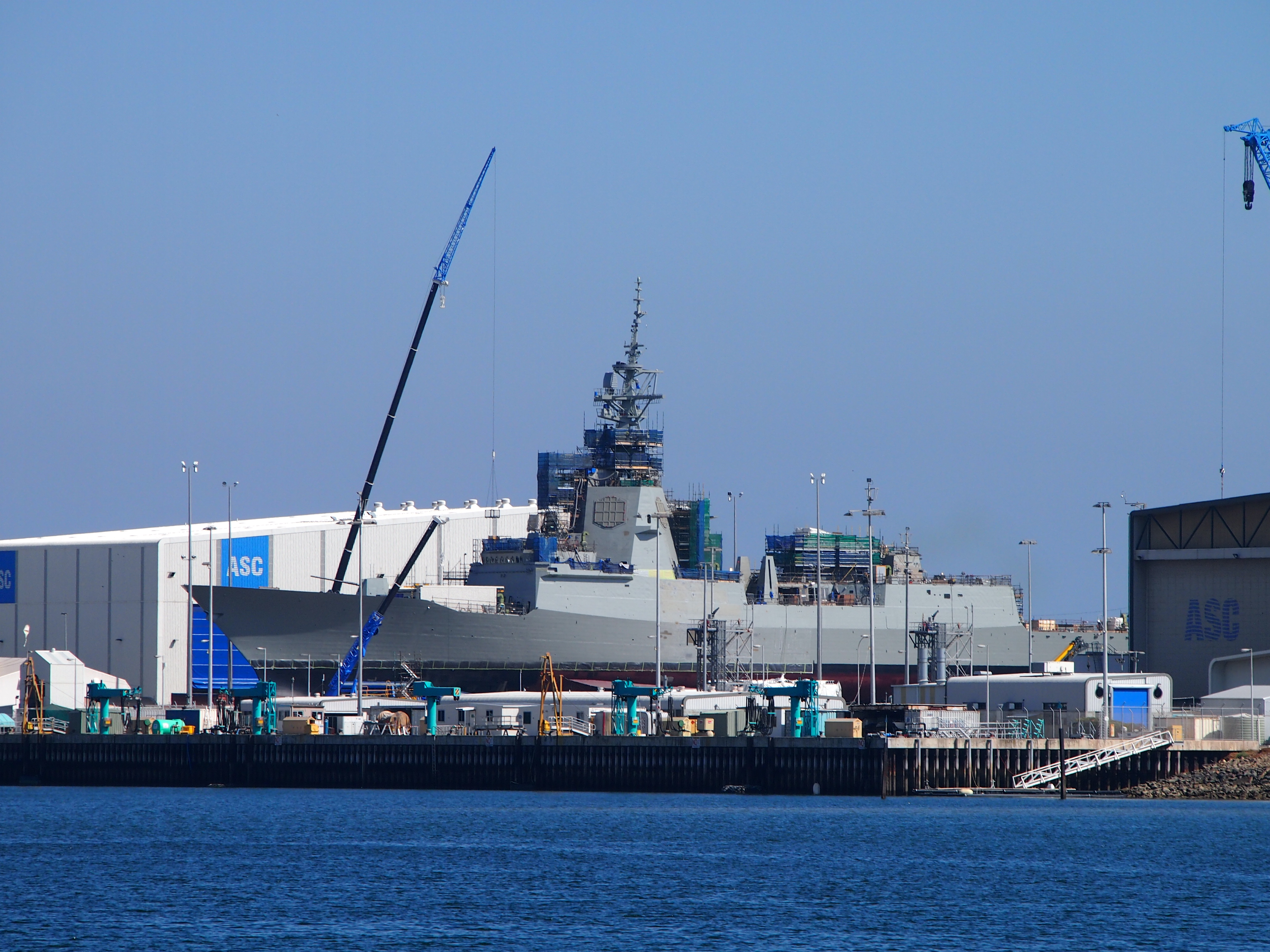
HMAS Hobart under construction by ASC at Osborne

The Australian Submarine Corporation was formed when Kockums (designer of the Collins-class submarine) formed a joint venture with Chicago Bridge & Iron, Wormald International and the Australian Industry Development Corporation to construct the six vessels.

The ASC construction facility was established on previously undeveloped land on the bank of the Port River, at Osborne, South Australia. Work on the site began on 29 June 1987, and it was opened in November 1989. South Australia had been selected as the site of the construction facility based on the proposed location of the facility and promises by the State Government to help minimise any problems caused by workers unions.

By the end of 1990, Chicago Bridge & Iron and Wormald International had both sold their shares in ASC. The shares were bought up by Kockums and the Australian Industry Development Corporation, with some of Kockums' shares then sold to James Hardie to maintain an Australian majority ownership of the company. On 5 April 2000, the shares in ASC held by Kockums were bought out and the company was nationalised, despite a trend by the Howard government towards privatisation of government-owned companies. In 1991 the company had brought the insolvent Carrington Slipways in New South Wales to expand operations.

The company's name was changed from the Australian Submarine Corporation Pty Ltd to ASC Pty Ltd on 1 October 2004 to position it as a supplier of naval combat vessels in addition to being a specialist submarine supplier and maintainer. The name was specifically selected to reflect "the company’s future business and shipbuilding activities" and the establishment of their shipbuilding operations.

On 31 May 2005, ASC was selected by the Australian Government as the preferred shipbuilder for RAN's Air Warfare Destroyers (AWDs) under the SEA 4000 acquisition contract, one the largest in Australian Defence history. The Australian Government granted first pass approval for the project and provided $455 million to ASC towards "the next phase of activities including further design work, workforce skilling, initial infrastructure investment and facilities construction."

In October 2016, the Federal Government confirmed that ASC would be dissolved into three companies focused on different elements of current ASC works. One would be dedicated to the Air Warfare Destroyers, one to continued submarine sustainment and development and one to infrastructure development. Dissolution was expected to be complete by 2017.

Under agreements struck with the South Australian Government, the newly formed infrastructure owner and manager, Australian Naval Infrastructure Pty Ltd (ANI), completed the acquisition of the Techport business in November 2017, enabling it to effectively consolidate ownership of the newly named Osborne Naval Shipyard precinct. Assets acquired included the Common User Facility and all shipyard infrastructure.

On 27 July 2018, ASC delivered the second Air Warfare Destroyer, HMAS Brisbane, to the Australian Defence Force. In December 2018, ASC Shipbuilding was structurally separated from ASC Pty Ltd, and acquired by BAE Systems Australia. In 2021, ASC Shipbuilding is officially re-named BAE Systems Australia Maritime.

In 2020, ASC and the CSIRO begin a two-year research collaboration looking to more efficiently repair precision submarine components by perfecting ‘cold spray’ additive manufacturing techniques. On 28 Feb 2020, ASC delivered the third and final Air Warfare Destroyer, HMAS Sydney, to the ADF, marking the end of the shipbuilding for the Air Warfare Destroyer project SEA 4000.

In August 2022 ASC announced the opening of a new science and technology hub at Lot Fourteen in the Adelaide central business district, where research projects in fields such as robotics, artificial intelligence and machine learning would be undertaken.

== Products ==
ASC rose to prominence in 1987 when it was contracted by the Australian Government to design and manufacture a fleet of six Collins-class submarines for the Royal Australian Navy (RAN) in what was the largest defence contract ever signed in Australia. Although the submarine project was marred with difficulties throughout the 1990s, upon completion the Collins class were hailed as the most advanced diesel-electric submarines in the world. The difficulties continued, however, and the very expensive Collins-class submarines have been plagued with troubles and controversy ever since. ASC maintains the six Collins-class submarines for their operational lifespans under a A$3.5 billion contract with RAN. To date, no other navy has expressed interest in buying a Collins-class submarine.

In 2005, the company was selected by the Australian Government, ahead of two other bidders, as the preferred shipbuilder for three new AEGIS-based Australian air warfare destroyers (AWD) under the Sea 4000 Project. The AWDs are scheduled to begin service in 2013.

ASC was also set to construct twelve Shortfin Barracuda Block 1A diesel-electric submarines to replace the Collins-class submarine currently in service with the Royal Australian Navy. However, this was later cancelled in favour of a nuclear-powered attack submarine fleet.

ASC also has contracts for production of Keka-class coastal patrol boats, produced in Hong Kong for use of Hong Kong maritime police, and the Series T.81 produced in Thailand for the use of the Royal Thai Navy.

== Possible privatisation ==
In February 2014, the National Commission of Audit recommended in its Phase One Report that the Commonwealth sell its interest in ASC.
