= Defending Australia in the Asia Pacific Century: Force 2030 =

2009 Australian Government white paper

- Author: Australian Government
- Language: English
- Genre: Defence white paper
- Publisher: Department of Defence
- Publication date: 2009
- Publication place: Australia
- Pages: 140 pp.
- ISBN: 978-0-642-29702-0
- OCLC: 426475923

Defending Australia in the Asia Pacific Century: Force 2030 is an Australian Government white paper released on 2 May 2009. The publication seeks to provide guidance for Australia's defence policy and the Australian Defence Force (ADF) during the period 2009–2030.

== Background ==
In 2000, the then Coalition government released a defence white paper in response to the East Timor crisis that saw Australia deploying and leading a peacekeeping force in South-East Asia. The paper called for an increased expeditionary capability, and marked a departure from the defensive military posture (primacy of the air-sea gap) of the Defence of Australia Policy, that had been in place since the end of the Vietnam War.

A commitment to develop a new Defence white paper was one of the Australian Labor Party's (ALP's) policies during the 2007 Australian federal election. At the time the policy was launched, Labor's leader Kevin Rudd argued that the Howard government had over-committed the ADF and conducted insufficient planning. Rudd promised that if elected his government would commission a new white paper to clarify the ADF's role and force structure.

In December 2007, shortly after the ALP Rudd government was sworn in, the Minister for Defence, Joel Fitzgibbon, directed the Department of Defence to begin work on the white paper. While the white paper was originally due to be completed in December 2008, it was delayed until 2009 due to the volume of work required.

== Key elements ==
Defending Australia in the Asia Pacific Century: Force 2030 was based around assumptions that China will become increasingly dominant in Australia's region and that Australia cannot rely on the United States for protection. The white paper outlines the Government's preferred ADF force structure, with specific elements for each of the three services.

=== Royal Australian Navy ===
The RAN is planned to undergo significant expansion:

- Replacing the current six Collins-class submarines with twelve new submarines
- Replacing the eight Anzac-class frigates with nine larger frigates
- Developing a class of twenty corvettes to replace the RAN's patrol boats and survey ships
- Replacing the Navy's heavy lift ship and replenishment ship
- Buying 24 new naval combat helicopters

The previously approved construction of at least three Hobart-class destroyers and two Canberra-class landing helicopter docks will also go ahead.

=== Royal Australian Air Force ===
The RAAF is planned to be re-equipped with up to 100 F-35 Lightning II combat aircraft, eight new maritime patrol aircraft, up to seven unmanned aerial vehicles and ten new light tactical transport aircraft along with an additional two C-130J Hercules.

=== Australian Army ===
There will be relatively few changes to the Army, which is to be organised into three brigades each with about 4,000 soldiers. The main new equipment for the Army will be up to 1,100 light armoured vehicles, seven new CH-47F Chinook helicopters to replace the current CH-47D models and new self-propelled and towed 155mm artillery guns.

== Reception ==
The white paper received a mixed response from governments in Australia's region, Australian political parties and defence commentators.

Malcolm Turnbull, the then leader of the Federal opposition, said the document did not provide details on how the plans it described would be funded. Senator Bob Brown, leader of the Australian Greens was critical of increasing defence expenditure during an economic downturn and said that these resources would be better used to counter climate change.

Australian Department of Defence officials briefed the Chinese, Indian, Indonesian, Japanese and United States governments as well as the governments of several other countries in Australia's region before the white paper was released. The Chinese Government was reported to be concerned about the white paper's identification of China as a possible threat to Australia's security. The Indonesian Government was supportive of the plan.

Brookings Federal Executive Fellow of the John Angevine has argued that the concept of defence self-reliance in the white paper is wrong and that Australia should seek closer defence ties with the United States instead.
