= Hobart-class destroyer =

Class of destroyer of Royal Australian Navy

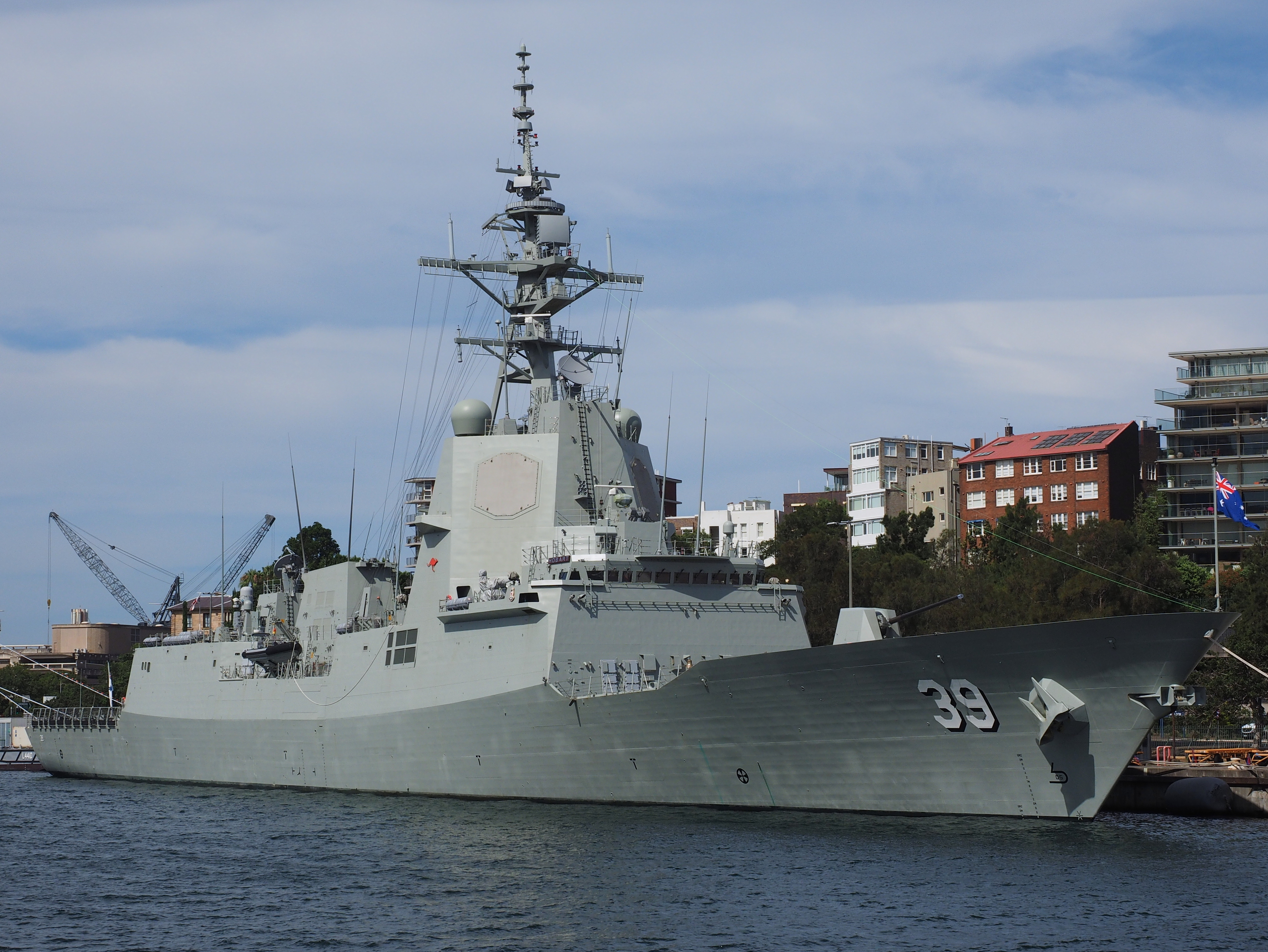
- HMAS Hobart in December 2017

Class overview
- Name: Hobart class
- Builders: Navantia (designer); AWD Alliance (project coordinator); ASC (primary shipbuilder); Forgacs Group and BAE Systems Australia (module builders)
- Operators: Royal Australian Navy
- Preceded by: Perth-class destroyer and Adelaide-class frigate
- Subclasses: Álvaro de Bazán-class frigate (parent)
- Cost: A$9.1 billion (2020) for 3 units + ToT (est.); A$3.03 billion (2020) per unit (est.)
- Built: 2009–2020
- In commission: 2017–present
- Completed: 3
- Active: 3

General characteristics (as designed)
- Type: Guided-missile destroyer
- Displacement: 7,000 tonnes (6,900 long tons; 7,700 short tons) full load
- Length: 147.2 metres (483 ft)
- Beam: 18.6 metres (61 ft) maximum
- Draught: 5.17 metres (17.0 ft)
- Propulsion: Combined diesel or gas (CODOG) arrangement; 2 × General Electric Marine model 7LM2500-SA-MLG38 gas turbines, 17,500 kilowatts (23,500 hp) each; 2 × Caterpillar Bravo 16 V Bravo diesel engines, 5,650 kilowatts (7,580 hp) each; 2 × controllable pitch propellers
- Speed: Over 28 knots (52 km/h; 32 mph)
- Range: Over 5,000 nautical miles (9,300 km; 5,800 mi) at 18 knots (33 km/h; 21 mph)
- Boats & landing craft carried: 2 x 7.2m RHIBs
- Complement: 186 + 16 aircrew; Accommodation for 234
- Sensors & processing systems: Aegis combat system; Lockheed Martin AN/SPY-1D(V) S-band radar; Northrop Grumman AN/SPQ-9B X-band pulse Doppler horizon search radar; Raytheon Mark 99 fire-control system with two AN/SPG-62 continuous wave illuminating radars; 2 × L-3 Communications SAM Electronics X-band navigation radars; Ultra Electronics Sonar Systems, hull mounted sonar and towed sonar; Ultra Electronics Series 2500 electro-optical director; Sagem VAMPIR IR search and track system; Rafael Toplite stabilised target acquisition sights
- Electronic warfare & decoys: ITT EDO Reconnaissance and Surveillance Systems ES-3701 ESM radar; SwRI MBS-567A communications ESM system; Ultra Electronics Avalon Systems multipurpose digital receiver; Jenkins Engineering Defence Systems low-band receiver; 4 × quad Nulka decoy launchers; 4 × Mk36 SRBOC 6-tube 130mm multipurpose decoy launchers
- Armament: Missiles: 48-cell Mark 41 Vertical Launch System firing: SM-2 Standard missile; RIM-162 Evolved Sea Sparrow missile; SM-6 missile; Tomahawk cruise missile; 2 x 4-canister Naval Strike Missile launchers; Torpedoes: 2 × 2-tube Mark 32 Mod 9 torpedo launchers firing MU90 Impact torpedoes; Guns: 1 × 5"/62 calibre Mark 45 mod 4 main gun; 2 × 25mm M242 Bushmaster Mk 38 mod 2 Typhoon RWS; 1 × 20mm Phalanx CIWS
- Aircraft carried: 1 × MH-60R Seahawk

The Hobart class is a ship class of three air warfare destroyers (AWDs) built for the Royal Australian Navy (RAN). Planning for ships to replace the Adelaide-class frigates and restore the capability last exhibited by the Perth-class destroyers began by 2000, initially under acquisition project SEA 1400, which was re-designated SEA 4000. Although the designation "Air Warfare Destroyer" is used to describe ships dedicated to the defence of a naval force (plus assets ashore) from aircraft and missile attack, the destroyers are expected to also operate in anti-surface, anti-submarine, and naval gunfire support roles.

Planning for the Australian Air Warfare Destroyer (as the class was known until 2006) continued through the mid-2000s, with the selection of the Aegis combat system as the intended combat system and ASC Pty Ltd (ASC) as the primary shipbuilder in 2005. In late 2005, the AWD Alliance was formed as a consortium of the Defence Materiel Organisation (DMO), ASC, and Raytheon. Between 2005 and 2007, Gibbs & Cox's Evolved Arleigh Burke-class destroyer concept and Navantia's Álvaro de Bazán-class frigate competed for selection as the AWD design. Although the Arleigh Burke design was larger and more capable, the Álvaro de Bazán design was selected in June 2007 as it was an existing design and would be cheaper, quicker, and less risky to build.

Three ships were ordered in October 2007, and were assembled at ASC's facility in Osborne, South Australia, from 31 pre-fabricated modules (or 'blocks'). An option to build a fourth destroyer was included in the original contract but was not exercised. ASC, NQEA, and Forgacs Group were selected in May 2009 to build the blocks, but within two months, NQEA was replaced by BAE Systems Australia. Construction errors and growing delays led the AWD Alliance to redistribute the construction workload in 2011, with some modules to be built by Navantia. Increasing slippage pushed the original planned 2014-2016 commissioning dates out by at least three years, with lead ship Hobart to be completed by June 2017, Brisbane in September 2018, and Sydney by March 2020. The AWD Alliance, Navantia, and the involved shipyards were criticised for underestimating risks, costs, and timeframes; faulty drawings and bad building practices leading to repeated manufacturing errors; and blame-passing. The alliance concept was panned for having no clear management structure or entity in charge, and having the DMO simultaneously acting as supplier, build partner, and customer for the ships.

== Planning ==
The 1992 Force Structure Review contained plans to replace the three Perth-class guided-missile destroyers and four of the six Adelaide-class guided-missile frigates with air defence vessels. The initial proposal – to build an additional six Anzac-class frigates configured for wide-area anti-aircraft warfare – did not go ahead as the Anzac design was too small to effectively host all the required equipment and weapons. Instead, the RAN began to upgrade the Adelaides in 1999 to fill the anti-aircraft capability that would be lost when the Perths left service between 1999 and 2001. The frigate upgrade was only intended as a stop-gap (only four ships were upgraded, and all four were due to decommissioning during the mid-2010s), and by 2000, the Australian Defence Force had begun a project to replace the three Perth-class destroyers. The acquisition of the dedicated air warfare destroyers was initially identified as Project SEA 1400, then redesignated Project SEA 4000.

The main role of the air warfare destroyer is air defence of a naval task group, in addition to assets ashore and operating in the littoral. Although specifically designed for air warfare, the AWDs also had to be capable of facing other threats and were to be fitted with ship-to-ship missiles, a gun for naval gunfire support of soldiers ashore, and anti-submarine capability through sonar systems and above-water-launched torpedoes. The ships had to be able to operate a helicopter for both surveillance and combat duties.

In 2004, the Department of Defence identified that the future air warfare destroyer class would be built around the United States Navy's Aegis Combat System. The use of Aegis was formally approved in April 2005, and Raytheon Australia was brought into the AWD project with the responsibility of integrating the Aegis system into the selected design, along with modifications to accommodate RAN-preferred electronic warfare equipment, underwater sensors, and weapons. In May 2005, the ASC shipyard at Osborne, South Australia, was identified as the primary shipbuilder for the project. In late 2005, the AWD Alliance was formed to organise and implement the project. The Alliance is a consortium including the Defence Materiel Organisation (DMO), ASC's project-dedicated subsidiary, and Raytheon.

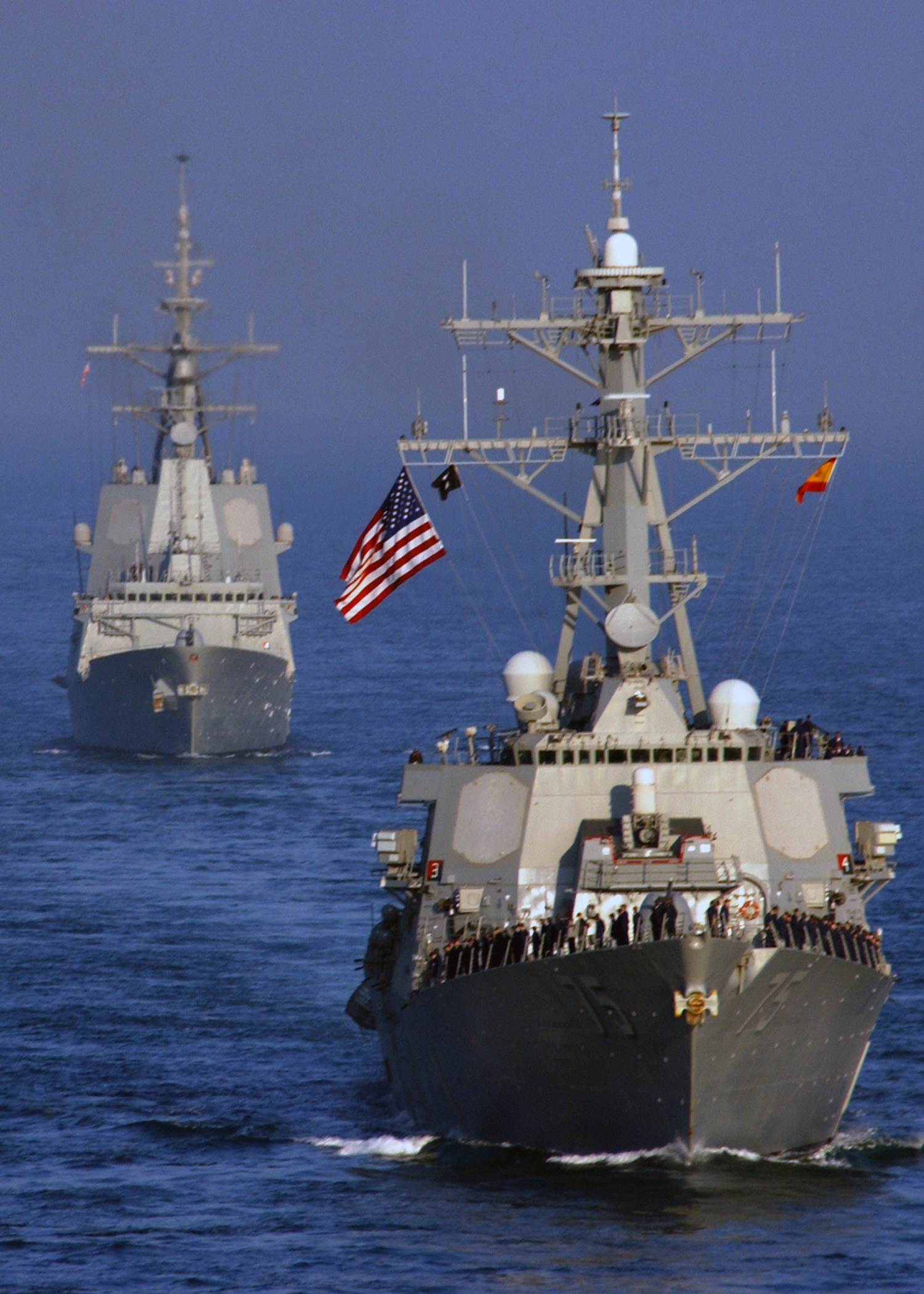
The two competing designs for the Australian AWD project: Arleigh Burke-class destroyer USS Donald Cook leading Álvaro de Bazán-class frigate Álvaro de Bazán in 2005

After receiving tenders from Blohm + Voss, Navantia, and Gibbs & Cox, among others, the Australian government identified Gibbs & Cox's Evolved Flight II Arleigh Burke-class destroyer as the preferred design in August 2005. The Álvaro de Bazán-class frigate, designed by Navantia, was identified as the official alternative, and both designs began further testing and modification as part of a two-year selection process. The two ship designs were equivalent in many areas, including length, speed and weapons outfit, although the Arleigh Burke class was larger with a displacement 2,200 tons greater than the Spanish frigate, and had superior capabilities in regards to range (700 nautical miles (1,300 km; 810 mi) greater), helicopter operations (two embarked helicopters instead of one), primary armament is rather comparable (2 x 32-cell (64 total cells) Mark 41 Vertical Launch System compared to a 48-cell launcher), and close-defence (with a second close-in weapons system). The Chief of Navy, Vice Admiral Russ Shalders, believed the American design would provide the RAN with a greater long-term capability, as there was greater scope for upgrades and modifications later in the ships' careers. Despite the American destroyer being the preferred option, the conclusion of the selection process in late June 2007 saw Navantia's Álvaro de Bazán design selected: the Spanish ships were considered a less-risky design as, unlike the Evolved Arleigh Burkes (which at this point only existed as an on-paper design), vessels of the Spanish design had been built and were operational. The Álvaro de Bazán derivatives were predicted to be in service four years earlier than the American-designed ships, and would cost A$1 billion less to build, with further financial and technical benefits in ordering the AWDs and the Canberra-class landing helicopter dock ships from the same supplier.

The contract for the ships was signed on 4 October 2007. The A$8 billion three-ship deal included the option to order a fourth ship at a later date. This option was due to expire in October 2008. The Australian government sought to extend the offer into early 2009, so as to review the recommendations of the Defending Australia in the Asia Pacific Century: Force 2030 white paper due for completion at the end of 2008, and to enquire about acquiring a fourth Aegis system from the USN, before ordering or cancelling the fourth destroyer. The Navy League of Australia has consistently supported the acquisition of a fourth AWD. According to the Navy League, building a fourth destroyer would be relatively cheap (money for design and other 'start-up' costs would have already been spent) and improve RAN capabilities (by offering increased flexibility and redundancy, particularly in the event of a Falklands War-like armed conflict). Along with the Navy League, the Australian defence industry has supported a fourth destroyer, to keep workers employed for longer while reducing the gap to the next major defence construction projects (the Collins-class replacement and the Anzac-class replacement).

The Australian Minister for Defence announced on 20 January 2006 that the Air Warfare Destroyers will be named HMAS Hobart (DDG 39), HMAS Brisbane (DDG 41), and HMAS Sydney (DDG 42). The Navy League of Australia suggested several possible names for a possible fourth destroyer; one was to name the ship Melbourne; another involved taking the Adelaide name from the second Canberra-class landing helicopter dock ship, and renaming the larger vessel Australia.

In April 2022, Navantia Australia made an unsolicited bid to build an additional three Hobart-class air warfare destroyers for the Royal Australian Navy due to possible delays to the Hunter-class frigate program.

== Design ==
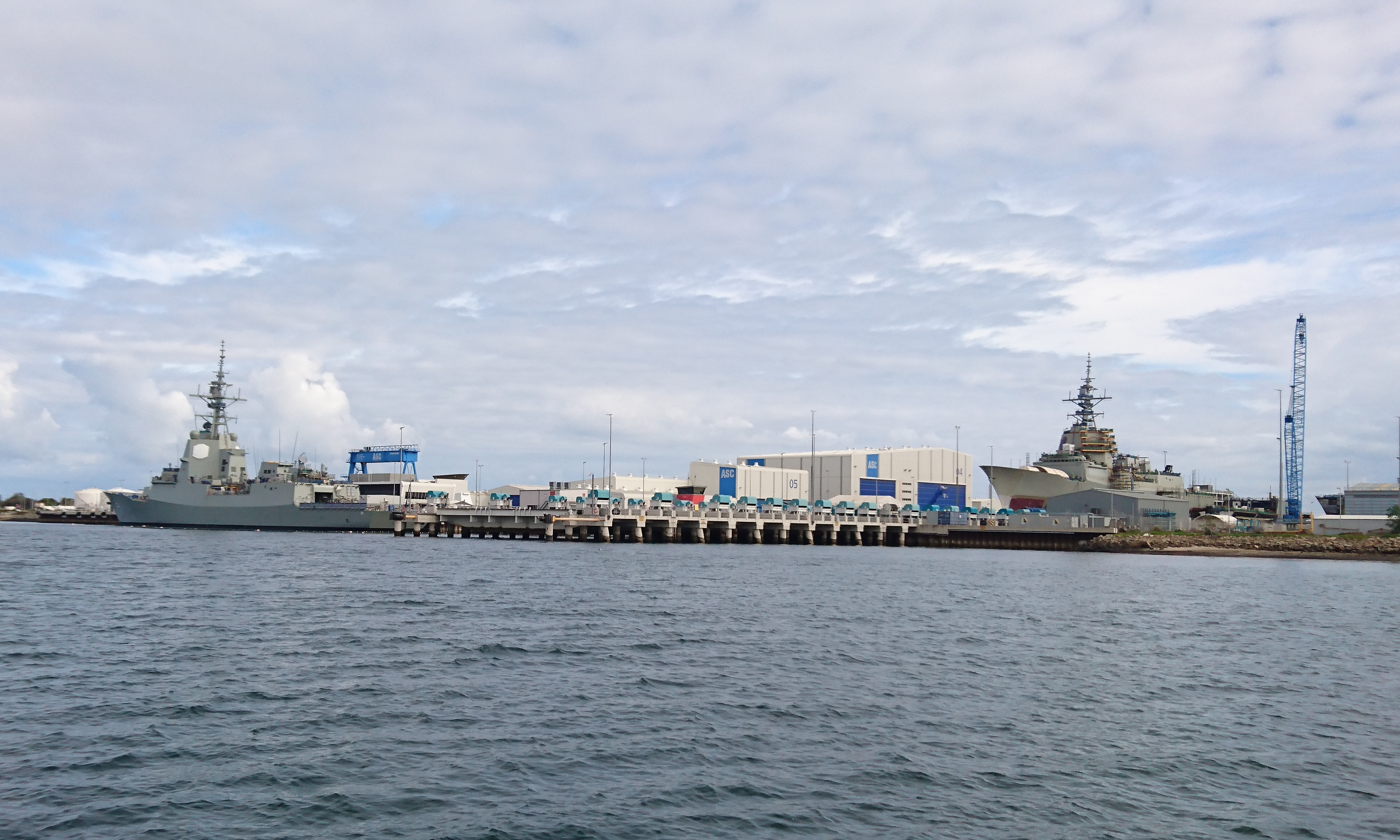
HMAS Hobart, left, and HMAS Brisbane at ASC Osborne in June 2016.

Each destroyer will have a length overall of 147.2 metres (483 ft), a maximum beam of 18.6 metres (61 ft), and a draught of 5.17 metres (17.0 ft). At launch, the ships will have a full-load displacement of 6,250 tonnes (6,150 long tons; 6,890 short tons). The Hobarts have been designed to allow for upgrades and installation of new equipment, with a theoretical maximum displacement of 7,000 tonnes (6,900 long tons; 7,700 short tons).

The Hobarts use a more powerful propulsion system than their Spanish predecessors. The combined diesel or gas turbine (CODOG) propulsion arrangement consists of two General Electric Marine model 7LM2500-SA-MLG38 gas turbines, each generating 17,500 kilowatts (23,500 hp), and two Caterpillar Bravo 16 V Bravo diesel engines, each providing 5,650 kilowatts (7,580 hp). These drive two propeller shafts, fitted with Wärtsilä controllable pitch propellers. The ships' maximum speed is over 28 knots (52 km/h; 32 mph), with a range of over 5,000 nautical miles (9,300 km; 5,800 mi) at 18 knots (33 km/h; 21 mph); although not fast enough to keep pace with an American carrier battle group, the RAN is happy with the speed/range tradeoff, as endurance is more important for Australian operating conditions. For in-harbour manoeuvring, each destroyer is fitted with a bow thruster.

The standard ship's company is 186-strong, plus 16 additional personnel to operate and maintain the ship's helicopter. Additional accommodation increases the maximum potential complement to 31 officers and 203 sailors. Onboard electricity requirements (the hotel load) are supplied by four MTU prime mover diesel motors connected to Alconza alternators.

=== Armament ===
Each ship's main weapon is a 48-cell Mark 41 Vertical Launch System. The cells are capable of firing the SM-2 Block IIIB Standard anti-aircraft missile or the quad-packed RIM-162 Evolved Sea Sparrow point-defence missile.

The missiles are supplemented by two four-canister launchers for Harpoon anti-ship missiles, and a BAE Systems Mark 45 (Mod 4) 5-inch gun with a 62-calibre barrel. The 5-inch gun has a maximum range of 23.6 kilometres (14.7 mi). Two Babcock Mark 32 Mod 9 two-tube torpedo launchers will be carried, and used to fire Eurotorp MU90 torpedoes at submarines. For close-in defence, the ships will carry an aft-facing Phalanx CIWS system, plus two M242 Bushmasters in Typhoon mounts sited on the bridge wings.

In November 2006, the Australian Government commissioned research on whether the AWDs should be equipped with anti-ballistic missile capabilities, most likely linked to the United States Department of Defense's Aegis Ballistic Missile Defense System.

The Hobarts carry a single MH-60 Romeo version of the Seahawk. Two rigid-hulled inflatable boats are carried.

In 2009, the government announced in the 2009 Defence Whitepaper that the Hobarts would be armed with the Standard Missile 6 (SM-6). In August 2024, HMAS Sydney became the first of the Hobarts to fire a Standard Missile 6.

In 2021, the government announced that the Hobarts would be armed with Tomahawk cruise missiles to enable them to strike land targets at greater distances up to 2,500 km (1,553.43 mi). In December 2024, HMAS Brisbane became the first of the Hobarts to fire a Tomahawk cruise missile.

In 2022, the government announced that the Hobarts would be armed with the Naval Strike Missile to replace the RGM-84 Harpoon Block II which would more than double the strike range of the Hobarts. In June 2024, HMAS Sydney became the first of the Hobarts to fire a Naval Strike Missile.

In 2024, the government announced that the Hobarts would be armed with the SM-2 Block IIIC missile.

=== Sensors and systems ===
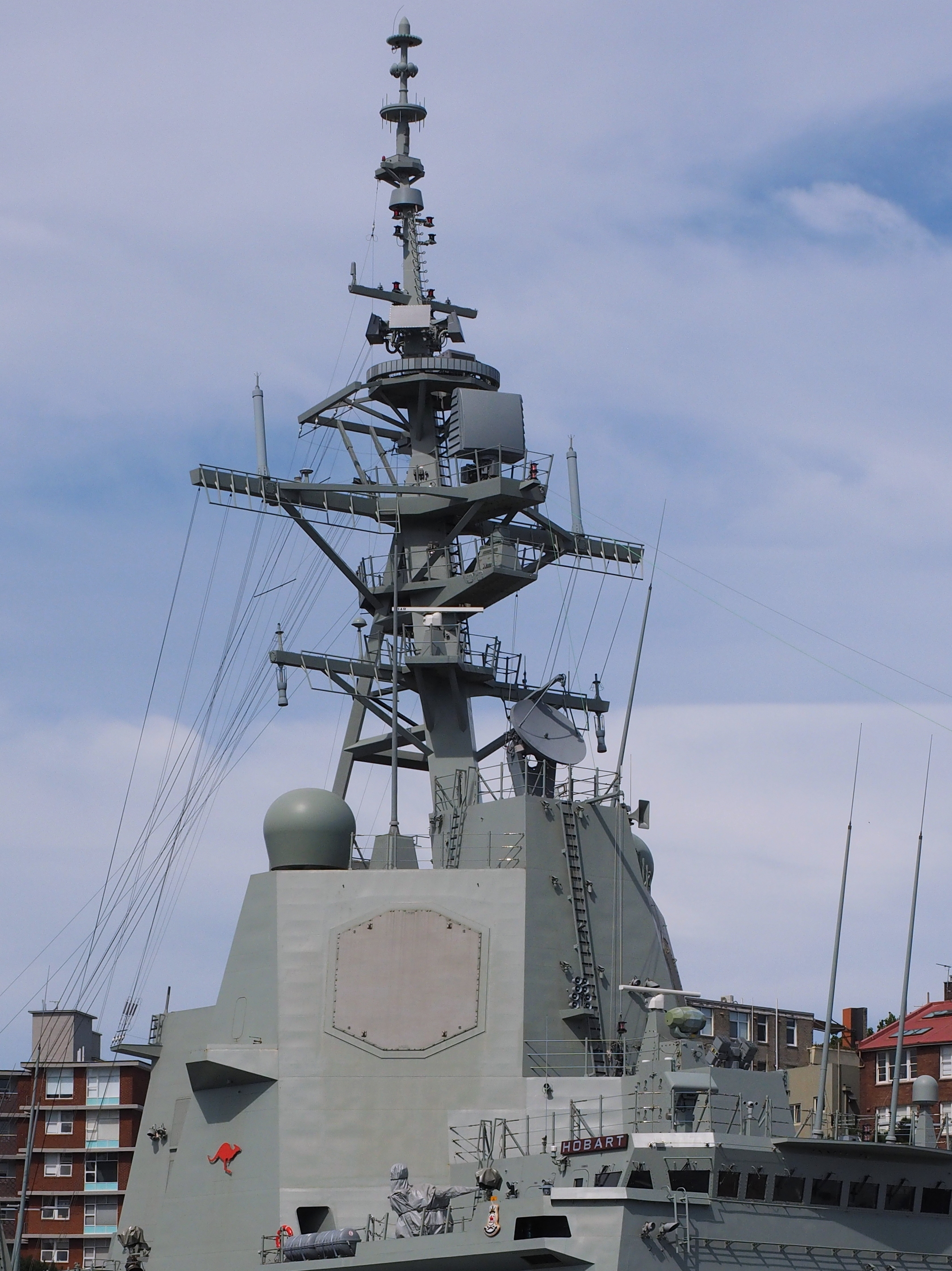
HMAS Hobart's mast and upper superstructure, showing many of the ship's sensors

The Hobarts are built around the Aegis combat system, specifically the Aegis Baseline 7.1 Refresh 2 version. The system has been 'Australianised' to be more capable in regard to non-aviation threats. The system feeds into the Australian Tactical Interface; six multi-function consoles that are capable of handling the destroyer's sonar, electronic warfare, and close-defence functions in addition to Aegis. The main radar system is the Lockheed Martin AN/SPY-1D(V) S-band radar. The combination of the AN/SPY-1D(V) radar, Aegis system, and Standard 2 missile will allow each destroyer to fire on enemy aircraft or missiles over 150 kilometres (93 mi) away.

In addition to the main radar, the Hobarts will be fitted with a Northrop Grumman AN/SPQ-9B X-band pulse Doppler horizon search radar, a Raytheon Mark 99 fire-control system with two continuous wave illuminating radars for missile direction, and two L-3 Communications SAM Electronics X-band navigation radars. The ships are fitted with an Ultra Electronics Sonar Systems' Integrated Sonar System, which includes a hull-mounted sonar and a towed variable depth sonar built up from a quad directional active-passive receive array, a passive torpedo detection array and a high-powered towed sonar source. Other sensors include an Ultra Electronics Series 2500 electro-optical director, a Sagem VAMPIR IR search and track system, and Rafael Toplite stabilised target acquisition sights for each ship's Typhoons.

Electronic warfare sensors consist of the ITT EDO Reconnaissance and Surveillance Systems ES-3701 electronic support measures (ESM) radar, a SwRI MBS-567A communications ESM system, an Ultra Electronics Avalon Systems multipurpose digital receiver, and a Jenkins Engineering Defence Systems low-band receiver. Countermeasures include four launchers for Nulka decoy missiles, plus four six-tube launchers for radio frequency, infrared, and underwater acoustic decoys.

Communications equipment includes HF, VHF, and UHF radios, Link 11 and Link 16 tactical data exchange uplinks, ASTIS MCE (Advanced SATCOM Terrestrial Infrastructure System Maritime Communications Elements) terminals, and Inmarsat equipment.

In September 2020, the government announced that the Aegis combat system would be upgraded. The upgrade will cost up to A$5.1 billion. As of August 2024, the Hobarts are yet to receive the Aegis Baseline 9 upgrade.

=== Control system ===
The control system for this class is provided by Navantia and is a version of the Integrated Platform Management System (IPMS) designed specifically for the Hobart Class Destroyers. The implementation of Navantia's IPMS uses COMPLEX / SIMPLEX, a framework developed by Navantia for new ship builds and all future modernisations. This system allows for the automation, control, and supervision of all the equipment that is installed on the ship with the exception of the combat system.

Currently within the Royal Australian Navy (RAN), the IPMS is installed on the Canberra-class landing helicopter docks, Hobart-class guided missile destroyers, and the Supply-class replenishment oiler platforms, as well as on-board more than 60 ships across multiple navies.

== Construction ==
Each ship is assembled from 31 pre-fabricated modules or 'blocks', averaging 200 tonnes (200 long tons; 220 short tons) in weight and 15 by 12 by 9 metres (49 by 39 by 30 ft) in size. The nine blocks making up the forward superstructure of each destroyer, containing the most sensitive or classified equipment, are manufactured by ASC's shipyard at Osborne, South Australia, where the final assembly of each destroyer will occur. The other 22 blocks for each ship were subcontracted out. On 9 May 2009, two companies were selected to fabricate the additional blocks: NQEA (building the twelve blocks of each ship's hull) and Forgacs Group (building the ten aft superstructure blocks per ship). However, during June, NQEA advised the AWD Alliance that the shipbuilder was undergoing restructuring and may have difficulty in meeting its contracted obligations. The Department of Defence went into negotiations with NQEA and BAE Systems Australia (which had been shortlisted during the initial subcontractor selection process), and at the end of June, transferred all of NQEA's work to BAE.

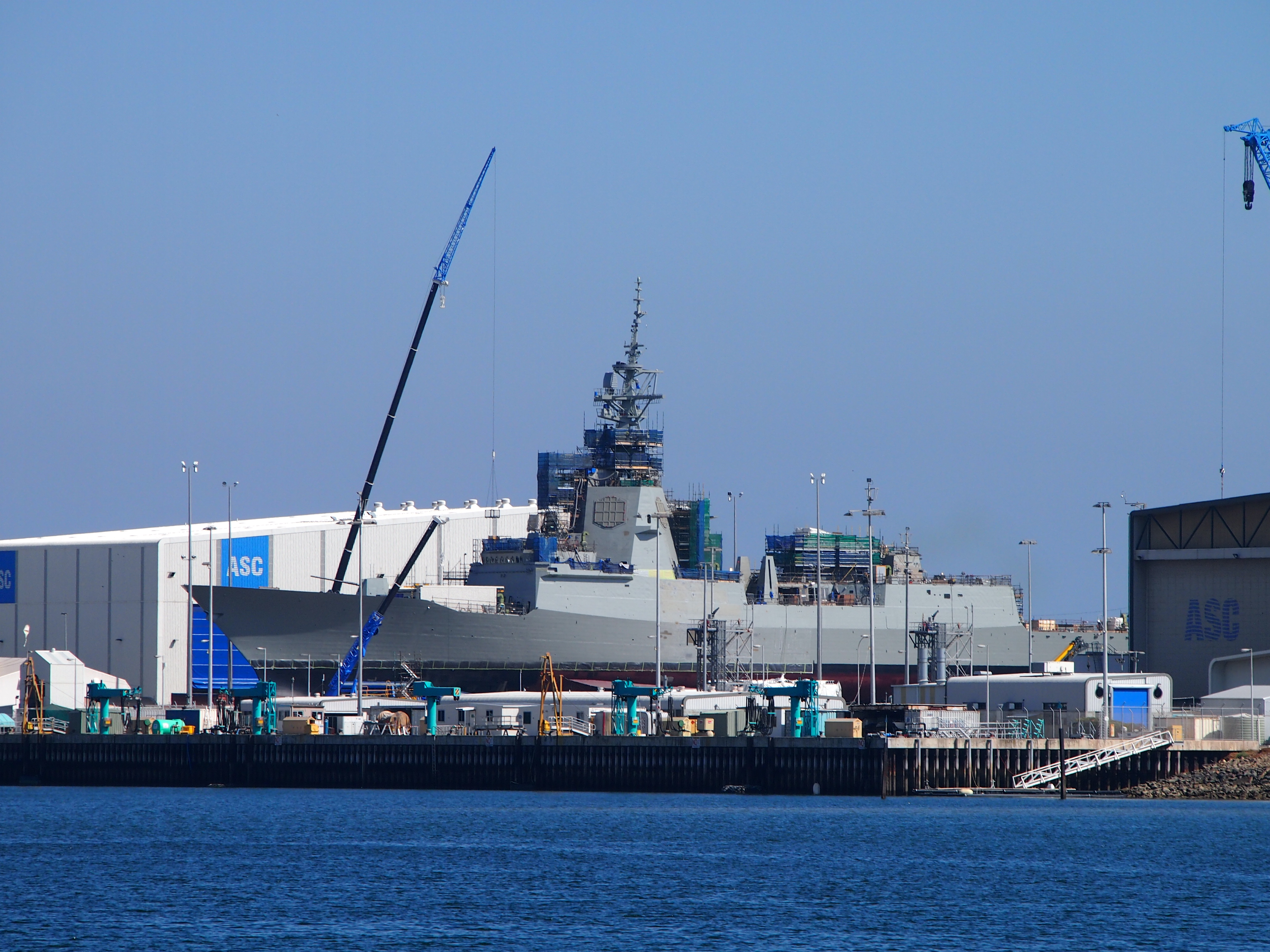
Hobart under construction in April 2015

In October 2010, the 20-by-17-metre (66 by 56 ft) central keel block manufactured by BAE for Hobart was found to be distorted and incompatible with other hull sections. The cause of the fabrication errors is unknown: BAE blamed incorrect drawings from designer Navantia, while the AWD Alliance claimed the other two shipyards have not experienced similar problems, when in fact they had, and suggested first-of-kind manufacturing errors were made by BAE. However, a report in 2014, by the Australian National Audit Office (ANAO) confirmed that 'errors resulting from a sub-standard technology transfer procedure (passing on specific techniques relative to the design) & drawings that were not localised by designer Navantia' were to blame. The delay in reworking the keel block was predicted to set construction back by at least six months. Other major issues during Hobart's construction included the need to replace 25% of the internal pipework due to faulty manufacture, and the initial rejection of the ship's mainmast block because of defects in the cabling and combat system equipment. Brisbane's construction has been marred by numerous defects requiring rework.

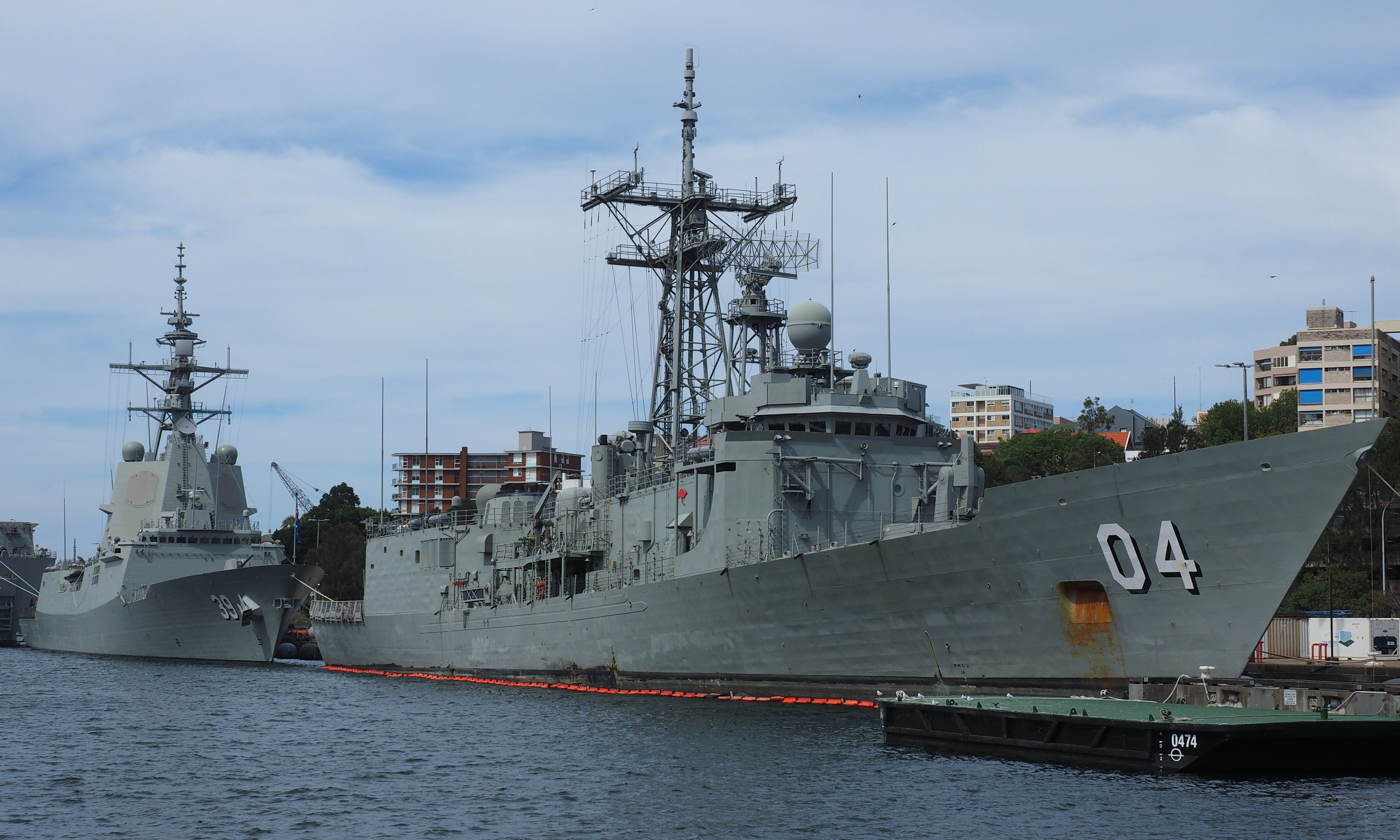
Hobart alongside HMAS Darwin in December 2017

In late May 2011, the government announced that the delay in building Hobart had increased to between one and two years, and would attempt to reduce the workload on BAE (which is also responsible for superstructure work on the Canberra-class amphibious ships) by redistributing up to 13 of the 24 hull blocks the company was slated to build for the first two ships to the other two shipyards. In addition, the three blocks containing each destroyer's hull-mounted sonar are being assembled by Navantia in Spain and the United Kingdom, with the possibility another two hull blocks could be assigned to the Spanish shipyard. An additional nine-month delay was announced in September 2012; this was intended to create a better transition of labour from the destroyers to following shipbuilding projects (replacements for the Collins-class submarines and the Anzac-class frigates), and achieve some savings in the federal budget.

A March 2014 report by the ANAO heavily criticised the DMO and the AWD Alliance for underestimating the risks in redesigning the ships for Australian operations, and building them in shipyards with no recent warship construction experience. The ANAO report also criticised designer Navantia and the shipyards involved in block construction over poor drawings, repeated errors, and bad building practices. As a result of further delays and growing costs, the Hobart-class destroyer project was added to the government's "Projects of Concern" list in June 2014. Follow-up government reports identified unrealistic time and cost estimates as additional factors. The overarching alliance concept has been repeatedly denounced, with no effective management structure or entity in charge, (allowing for repeated blame-passing between the individual alliance partners, Navantia, and the subcontracted shipyards), and the DMO locked in a contradictory role (simultaneously acting as supplier, build partner, and customer).

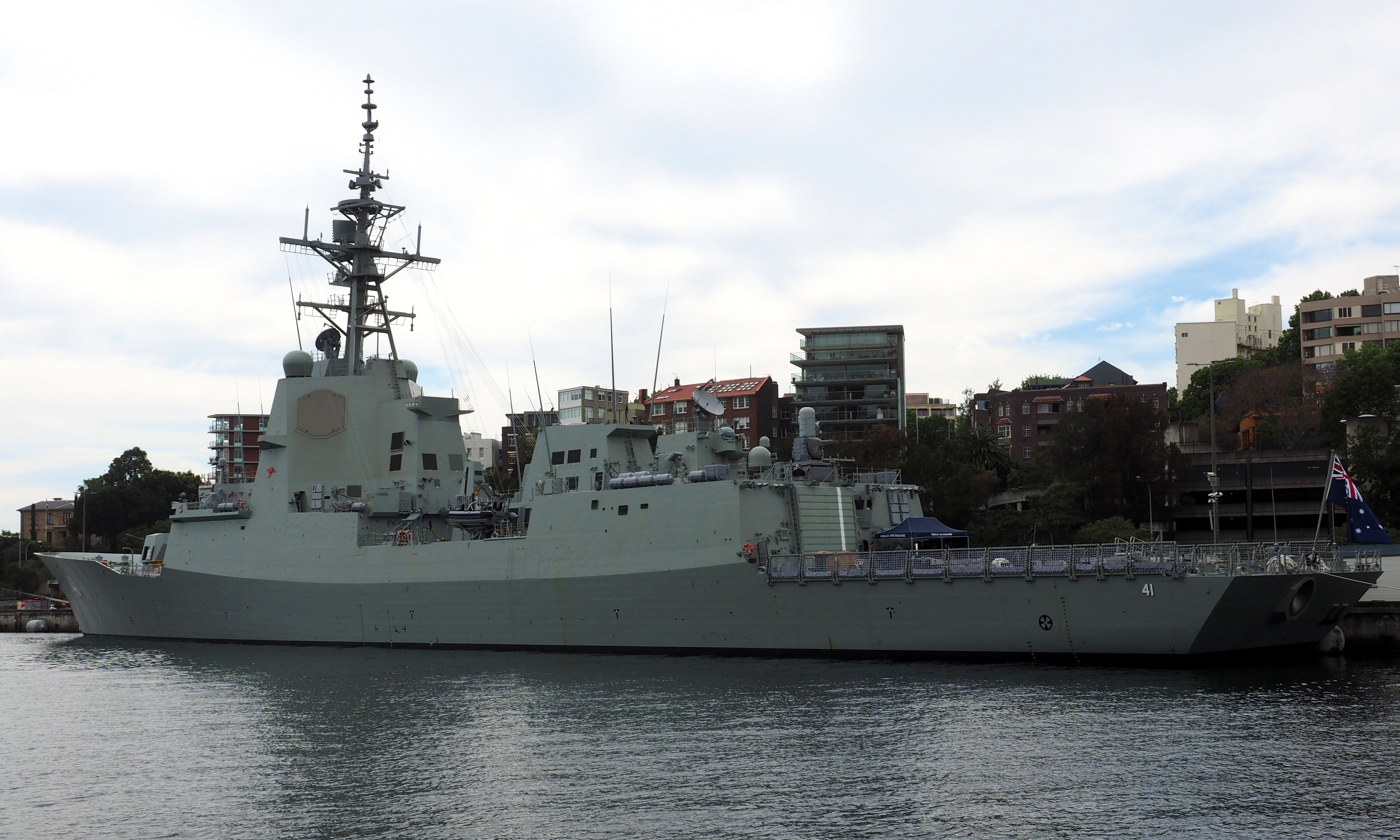
Brisbane moored alongside in Sydney just prior to her commissioning in October 2018

Hobart's keel was laid down on 6 September 2012, and the ship was launched on 23 May 2015, with 76% of construction complete. Brisbane was laid down on 3 February 2014, and by October 2015 was 68% complete. Sydney was laid down on 19 November 2015 (two weeks after the Adelaide-class frigate of the name was decommissioned, and on the anniversary of the loss of the second Sydney during World War II), with block fabrication due to complete in early 2016.

Originally, the Hobart-class destroyers were to be operational between December 2014 and June 2017. In September 2012, the ongoing delays prompted revision of the entry-to-service dates to March 2016, September 2017, and March 2019. In May 2015, the DMO announced additional schedule slippage, with Hobart to be handed over to the RAN in June 2017, Brisbane due in September 2018, and Sydney by December 2019. The original contract cost was about A$7.9 billion for the three ships. By March 2014, the project was running A$302 million over budget. By May 2015, this had increased to A$800 million, with a predicted minimum cost overrun by project end of A$1.2 billion.

In February 2018, the Hobart-class was removed from the "Projects of Concern" list, after long-term reform arrangements were put in place. In May 2018, the third and final Hobart-class ship, Sydney, was launched.

== Upgrade ==
The Royal Australian Navy's Hobart-class destroyers are undergoing a comprehensive upgrade under the SEA4000 Phase 6 project, aimed at enhancing their combat capabilities and ensuring interoperability with allied forces. A central component of this upgrade is the transition from the Aegis Baseline 8 to the more advanced Baseline 9 combat system, which introduces improved missile defense, radar tracking, and integrated fire control systems. Lockheed Martin Australia has played a pivotal role in this modernization, completing the Combat System Design Agent contract that integrates the new Aegis architecture into the destroyers' systems.

Navantia Australia, as the original designer of the Hobart-class destroyers, has been appointed the Platform Systems Designer for the SEA4000 Phase 6 upgrade. The company has released the first set of Ship Alterations drawings, which are essential for the physical modifications required to install new systems and equipment on the in-service warships. This work is being carried out in collaboration with Navantia's Technical Partner Network and involves a dedicated team of engineers and designers working to ensure the successful implementation of the upgrades.

Saab Australia is contributing significantly to the combat system upgrades by introducing a new Australian Interface (AI) that integrates with the Aegis Combat System. This interface aims to enhance the Royal Australian Navy's ability to deter, protect, and defend by increasing commonality across the surface fleet, thereby delivering operational, training, and sustainment efficiencies. Saab's involvement is part of a broader collaboration under the Combat Systems Integration – Integrated Project Team (CSI-IPT), which includes BAE Systems Australia and Lockheed Martin Australia, working together to deliver these advanced capabilities.

The Hobart-class upgrade is part of a broader initiative to enhance the Royal Australian Navy's surface combatant fleet in response to evolving regional security challenges. The 2023 Defence Strategic Review emphasized the need for increased firepower and advanced capabilities to address potential threats. The upgraded destroyers will feature enhanced missile systems, including the integration of the Naval Strike Missile and Tomahawk cruise missiles, providing greater offensive capabilities. These enhancements aim to ensure that the Hobart-class destroyers remain a formidable component of Australia's naval defense strategy.

== Ships ==
Name	Pennant number	Builder	Laid down	Launched	Commissioned	Status
Hobart	DDG 39	Navantia, ASC Pty Ltd, Osborne	6 September 2012	23 May 2015	23 September 2017	Active
Brisbane	DDG 41	Navantia, ASC Pty Ltd, Osborne	3 February 2014	15 December 2016	27 October 2018	Active
Sydney	DDG 42	Navantia, ASC Pty Ltd, Osborne	19 November 2015	19 May 2018	18 May 2020	Active

== See also ==
- List of active Royal Australian Navy ships
- List of destroyer classes in service

Equivalent destroyers of the same era

- Maya class
- Visakhapatnam class
- Zumwalt class
- Type 055
