= CEA Technologies =

Australian defence contractor

CEA Technologies Pty Ltd
- Industry: Defense, Electronic design, Radar, Communications, Coastal surveillance
- Founded: 1983; 43 years ago
- Founders: Ian Croser; David Gaul
- Headquarters: Canberra, Australia
- Area served: Worldwide
- Products: phased array radar missile guidance integrated communications data-fusion antenna systems
- Owner: Government of Australia
- Number of employees: 600 (2023)
- Website: CEA Technologies

CEA Technologies is an Australian government business enterprise that primarily supplies the Royal Australian Navy. The company was established in 1983. Its phase array radars, which are fitted to the Royal Australian Navy's fleet of warships, are regarded by Australians as the best in the world.

== History ==
CEA Technologies was established in 1983, founded by two retired Royal Australian Navy personnel, Ian Croser and David Gaul. Employing over 600 employees, it is Australia's largest majority owned defence company. CEA specialises in the design, development and manufacture of radar and communications systems for civil and military applications.

In 2016 Ian Croser was the inaugural recipient of the Australian Naval Institute McNeil Prize, presented to an individual from Australian industry who has made an outstanding contribution to the capabilities of the Royal Australian Navy.

In April 2023, it was announced that the Australian government would be purchasing a majority stake in CEA Technologies. The government stated that it was taking this step to ensure that the technology behind the radars CEA produces is controlled by Australia. It is intended that the government will not exercise direct control over the company, meaning that it will need to compete for business in Australia and be able to seek opportunities in the United States. In October 2023 the government revealed that it had spent $A365m on the transaction and it will own a 72 percent stake in the company with the option to buy the remaining share.

== Facilities ==
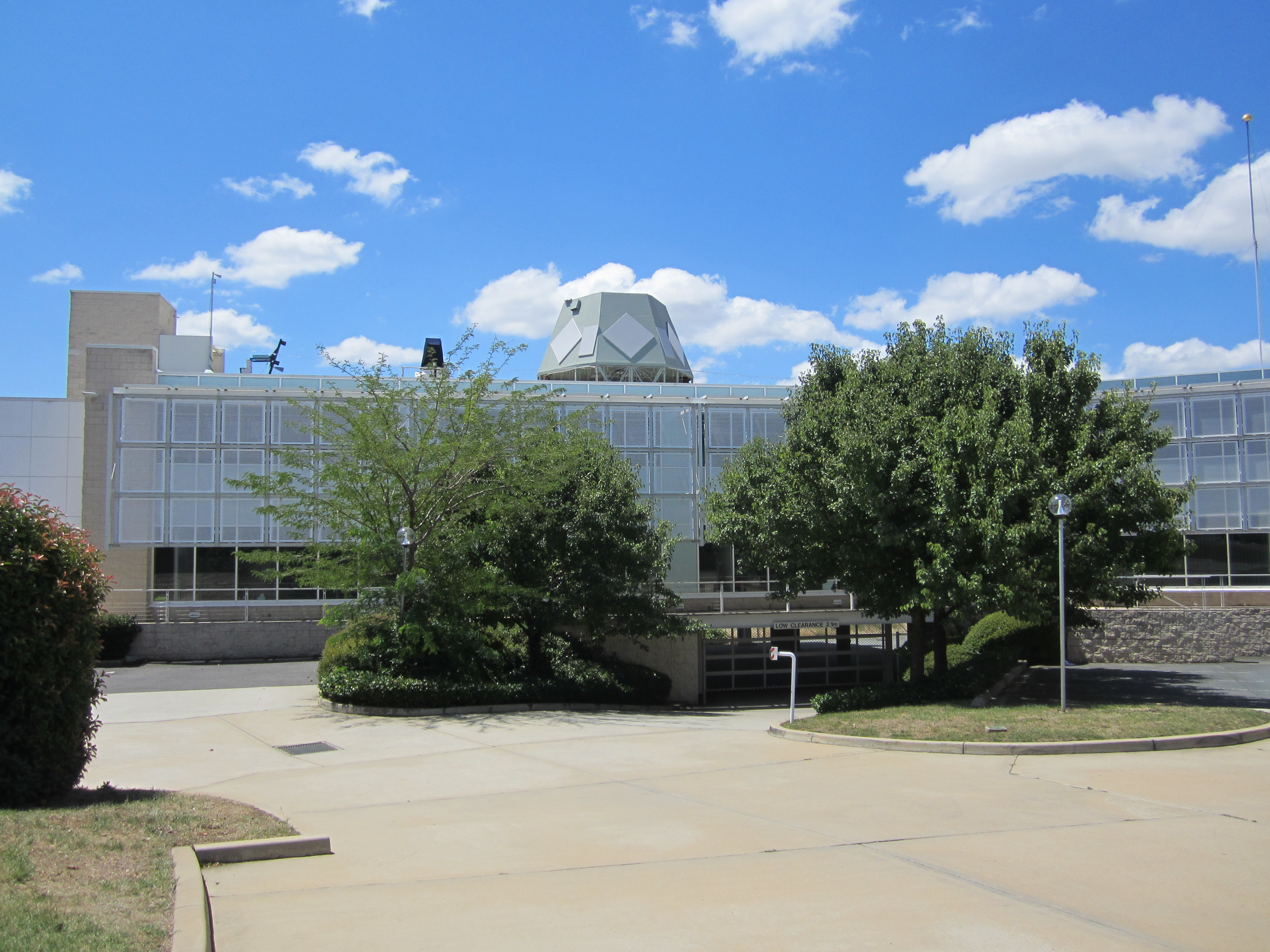
CEA Technologies' main building

The head office of CEA Technologies is located in Fyshwick, Australian Capital Territory where the organisation has a number of buildings, three of which are linked. Approximately one third of the staff are engineers, covering all necessary disciplines needed to design and develop leading edge radar and military grade communications products.

A skilled production group produce printed circuit board assemblies and mechanical assemblies in small to medium production runs. In addition to the administration and engineering offices and laboratories, the buildings house a small manufacturing and assembly facility, and an indoor antenna test facility. A mobile outdoor antenna test facility is used to support field testing and proving of radar and antenna systems.

CEA has facilities/offices in Adelaide, Melbourne, Perth and Hanover, Maryland.

== Products and services ==
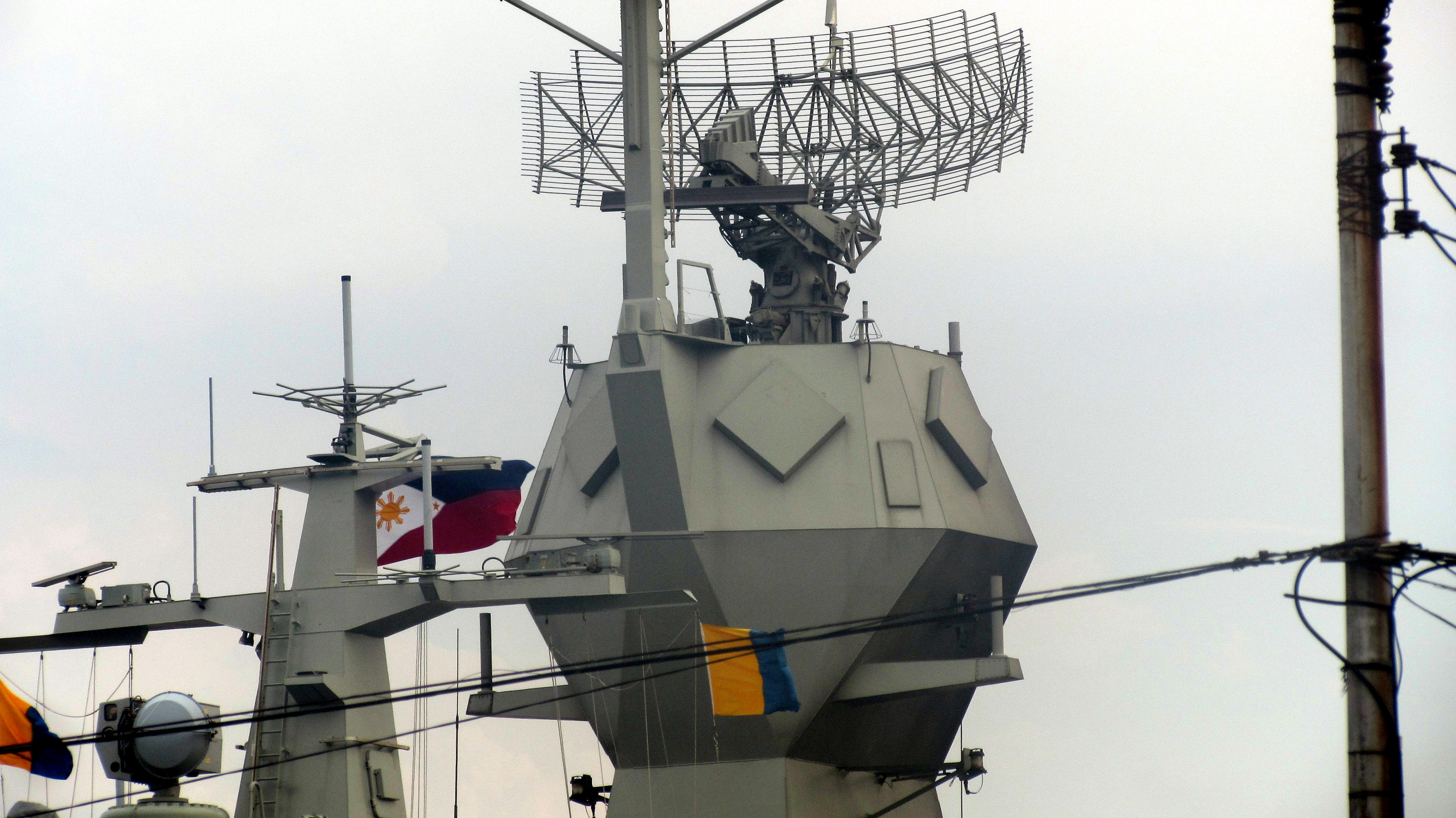
CEAFAR radar on an Anzac-class frigate

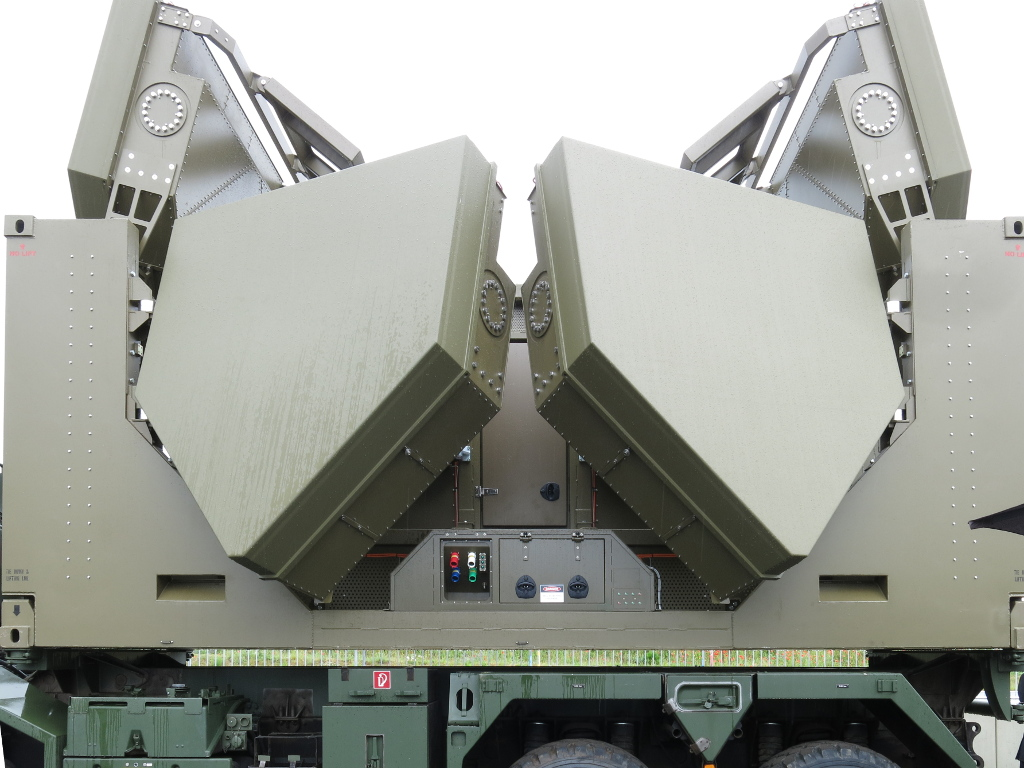
Ground Based Multi-Mission Radar (GBMMR) at ILA Berlin 2016

In 2011 CEA Technologies was selected to develop the CEAFAR Active Phased Array Radar and CEAMOUNT Active Phased Array Illuminator, as part of the Anti-Ship Missile Defense upgrade to the Anzac-class frigate. The program is listed as one of the Top 30 projects of the DoD's Defence Materiel Organisation. CEAFAR uses six square, fixed-face arrays installed in the ship's deckhouse.

A land-based variant of CEAFAR, named Ground Based Multi-Mission Radar (GBMMR), uses six enlarged fixed-face AESA arrays mounted on a heavy truck. It was shown to operate with IRIS-T SL medium-range ground-based air defense system during its test launches in 2014. It was subsequently offered for Egypt's purchase of IRIS-T SL systems, but lost to TRML-4D and TwinVis radars produced by Hensoldt.

Australian version of NASAMS 3 ground-based air defense system, to be deployed by 2023, will include CEAFAR tactical (CEATAC) and CEAFAR operational (CEAOPS) radars, developed from maritime CEAFAR2 AESA radar program for the Hunter-class frigate. CEATAC includes four small fixed-face AESA arrays mounted on a Hawkei PMV-L. CEAOPS is a scaled version with a large single-faced rotating AESA array and four small fixed-face arrays mounted on a HX77 heavy truck.

CEA has provided integrated communications systems to the Armidale class patrol boat.

CEA originally supplied and now supports vessel traffic service systems to several sites around Australia, and internationally.

CEA also researches, develops, and manufactures missile fire-control systems, wideband antenna systems, maritime integrated communications systems, and Harbour and coastal surveillance systems.
