= Nulka =

Naval missile decoy system

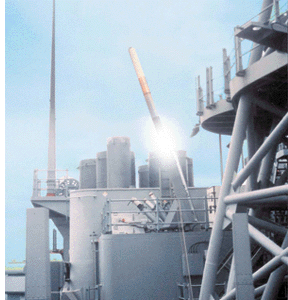
A Nulka decoy being launched from a warship

USCGC Bertholf tests its Nulka decoy system at the Pacific Missile Range (SoCal OPAREA), circa 2009

Nulka is an Australian-designed and developed active missile decoy built by an American/Australian collaboration. Used aboard warships of the United States Navy, Royal Australian Navy, United States Coast Guard and Royal Canadian Navy, Nulka is a rocket-propelled, disposable, offboard, active decoy designed to lure anti-ship missiles away from their targets. It has a unique design in that it hovers in mid-air while drawing the incoming anti-ship missile. The hovering rocket concept was initiated in Australia by the Defence Science and Technology Group (DSTG), and the system was designed, developed and then manufactured by AWA Defence Industries (now BAE Systems Australia). BAE refers to Nulka as a "soft-kill defence system". The word "Nulka" is of Australian Aboriginal origin and means "be quick".

The Nulka consists of the missile itself enclosed in a hermetically sealed canister. This canister is then contained in a dedicated launcher module, adjacent to and used in tandem with the Mark 36 launcher (if fitted).

By July 2017, Nulka had been fitted to more than 150 Australian, Canadian, and United States warships, and over 1,400 decoys had been produced. As of October 2010, it was expected that the system would be fitted to U.S. Navy's Nimitz-class aircraft carriers as well as Australia's future destroyers. This made the system Australia's most successful defence export.

In 2012, Lockheed Martin announced that it had successfully tested its new ExLS (Extensible Launching System) for Nulka. The tests were conducted at the RAAF Woomera Range Complex, Australia.

At around 19:00 local time on 9 October 2016, when off the Yemeni coast, the guided-missile destroyer USS Mason deployed its Nulka decoy when it and two other US warships, USS Ponce and USS Nitze, came under fire by two missiles fired by Houthi rebels.

== See also ==
- Aegis Ballistic Missile Defense System
- Electronic countermeasure
- Electronic warfare
- Naval Decoy IDS300
- Sonar decoy
- C-GEM
- Hilton Gumbys
