= BAE Systems Australia =

Defence contractor in Australia

BAE Systems Australia Limited
- Type: Subsidiary
- Industry: Aerospace and defence
- Founded: 1953
- Headquarters: Edinburgh Parks, Adelaide, Australia
- Key people: Sir Roger Carr (Chairman); Ben Hudson (CEO)
- Number of employees: Approximately 4,000
- Parent: BAE Systems
- Divisions: BAE Systems Maritime Australia
- Website: www.baesystems.com/en-aus/home

BAE Systems Australia, a subsidiary of BAE Systems, is one of the largest defence contractors in Australia. It was formed by the merger of British Aerospace Australia and GEC-Marconi Systems and expanded by the acquisitions of Armor Holdings in 2007 and Tenix Defence in June 2008.

== History ==
BAE Systems' Australian heritage dates back to testing of the first generation air defence missile systems at the Woomera Test Range in the early 1950s. Weapons testing at Woomera began in 1953 by the Bristol Aeroplane Company and English Electric. Both companies merged to become the British Aircraft Corporation (BAC). In 1977, BAC was nationalised and operations in Australia were renamed British Aerospace Australia.

British Aerospace Australia doubled in size in April 1996 with the purchase of AWA Defence Industries (AWADI). AWADI was formed in October 1988 by the merger of the defence electronics business of AWA, Thorn EMI Electronics Australia and Fairey Australasia.

BAE Systems was formed on 30 November 1999, following the merger of British Aerospace with the General Electric Company's (GEC) defence arm, Marconi Electronic Systems. BAE Systems Australia expanded with its parent company's acquisition of Armor Holdings in 2007 and doubled in size with the purchase of Tenix Defence in June 2008.

== Products and services ==
BAE Systems Australia provides many products and services to the Australian Defence Force (ADF) including: Fast Jet support, Military Flight Training, Autonomous Systems, Guided Weapons (naval air defence) and Communications, Command & Support.

BAE Systems Australia operates two business units: Aerospace and Maritime & Integrated Systems (M&IS).

=== Naval ===
BAE Systems inherited the Canberra-class landing helicopter dock project from Tenix Defence.

On 22 October 2008, BAE Systems was selected to continue with the Royal Australian Navy's Guided Missile Frigate Maintenance Contract (FFG IMS). BAE Systems replaced the existing company Thales Australia on 1 January 2009. This contract was expected to run until the last guided missile frigate (HMAS Newcastle) would be decommissioned in 2021. HMAS Newcastle was decommissioned on 30 June 2019 and later sold to Chile, where she entered service in 2020 as Capitán Prat (FFG 11). The last of the Adelaide-class guided missile frigates to leave Australian service was in fact HMAS Melbourne, which also was decommissioned in 2019, sold to Chile and entered service there in 2020 as Almirante Latorre.

BAE Systems' bid for work on the Hobart-class destroyers was rejected in May 2009, when the Air Warfare Destroyer Alliance subcontracted 70% of construction of the destroyers to NQEA and the Forgacs Marine & Defence. However, on 29 June 2009, the work allocated to NQEA was transferred to BAE Systems Australia due to the former being unable to meet its financial obligations to the project. BAE Systems will build a total of 36 blocks for the three destroyers at Williamstown Dockyard. These are the hull machinery compartments, and bow and stern sections of the ships.

BAE Systems was announced on 29 June 2018 as the preferred tenderer to build the Hunter-class frigates, through ASC Shipbuilding and building the nine ships in South Australia.

ASC Shipbuilding was acquired by BAE Systems in December 2018, and renamed BAE Systems Maritime Australia in 2021.

=== Aerospace ===
BAE Systems, along with several other defence contractors, is developing the MQ-28 Ghost Bat. They have also showcased the STRIX VSTOL drone at the Australian International Airshow.

BAE Australia is also developing the Razer low-cost PGM for the RAAF and export customers, and has gone through trials as of January 2025. The Razer is designed, developed and manufactured in Australia.

== Corporate and community ==
BAE Systems Australia is headquartered at Edinburgh Parks, South Australia. As of 19 November 2015 the company employs approximately 4,000 people Australia-wide. BAE Systems Australia's partner charity since 2015 is Soldier On with whom they work to support the health, employment and rehabilitation of Australia's veterans, service personnel and their families.
