= HMAS Farncomb =

1995 Collins-class submarine

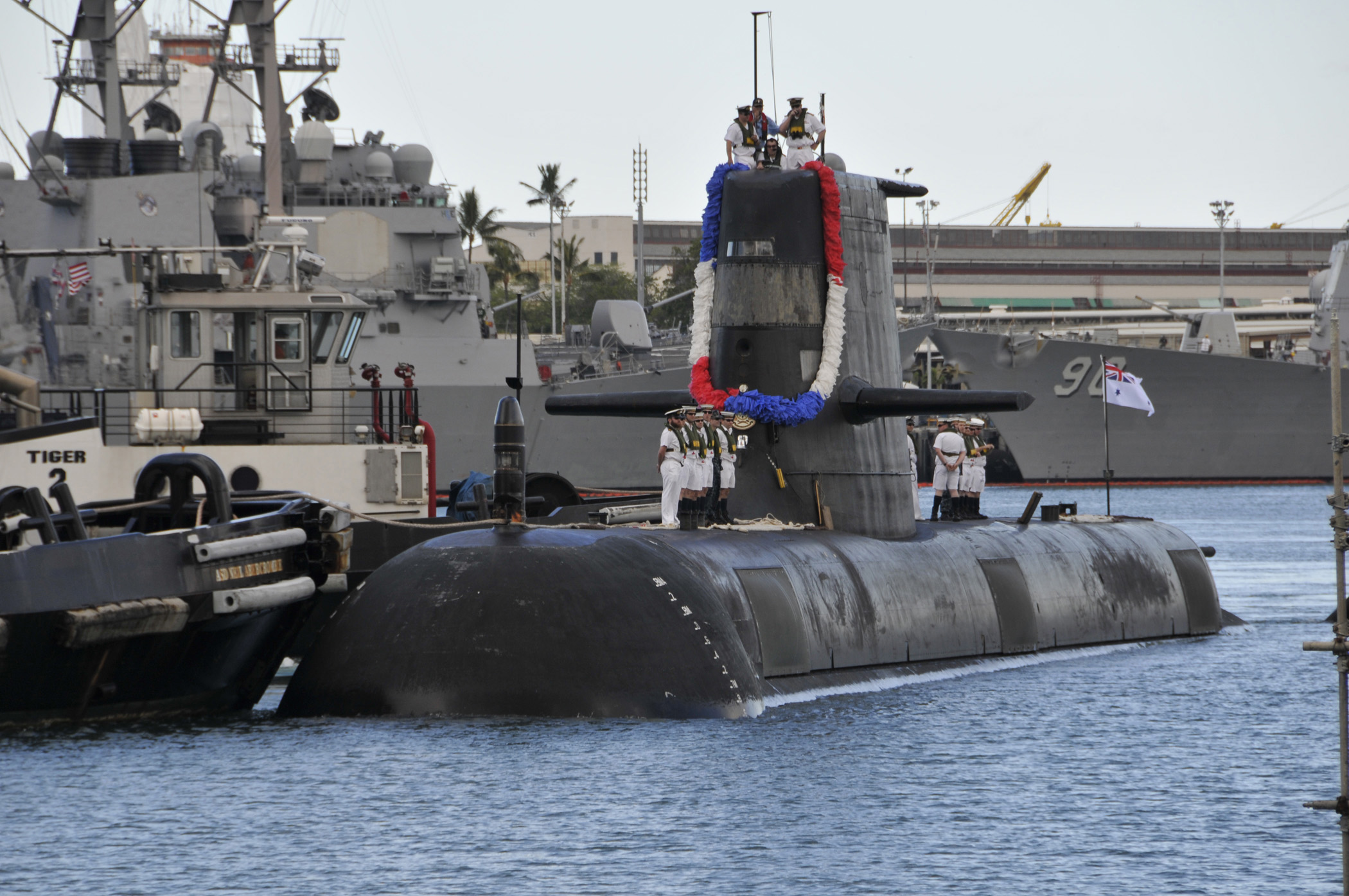
- Farncomb arriving at Pearl Harbor, Hawaii ahead of the RIMPAC 2012 exercise

History

Australia
- Name: Farncomb
- Namesake: Rear Admiral Harold Farncomb
- Builder: Australian Submarine Corporation, Osborne
- Laid down: 3 March 1991
- Launched: 15 December 1995
- Commissioned: 31 January 1998
- Home port: Fleet Base West, Perth
- Motto: "With Skill and Resolve"
- Status: Active as of 2018
- Badge

General characteristics
- Class & type: Collins-class submarine
- Displacement: 3,051 tonnes (surfaced); 3,353 tonnes (submerged)
- Length: 77.42 m (254.0 ft)
- Beam: 7.8 m (26 ft)
- Draught: 7 m (23 ft) at waterline
- Installed power: 3 × Garden Island-Hedemora HV V18b/15Ub (VB210) 18-cylinder diesel motors, 3 × Jeumont-Schneider generators (1,400 kW, 440-volt DC)
- Propulsion: Main: 1 × Jeumont-Schneider DC motor (7,200 shp), driving 1 × seven-bladed, 4.22 m (13.8 ft) diameter skewback propeller; Emergency: 1 × MacTaggart Scott DM 43006 retractable hydraulic motor
- Speed: 10.5 knots (19.4 km/h; 12.1 mph) (surfaced and snorkel depth); 21 knots (39 km/h; 24 mph) (submerged)
- Range: 11,000 nautical miles (20,000 km; 13,000 mi) at 10 knots (19 km/h; 12 mph) (surfaced); 9,000 nautical miles (17,000 km; 10,000 mi) at 10 knots (19 km/h; 12 mph) (snorkel); 32.6 nautical miles (60.4 km; 37.5 mi) at 21 knots (39 km/h; 24 mph) (submerged); 480 nautical miles (890 km; 550 mi) at 4 knots (7.4 km/h; 4.6 mph) (submerged)
- Endurance: 70 days
- Test depth: Over 180 m (590 ft) (actual depth classified)
- Complement: Originally 42 (plus up to 12 trainees); Increased to 58 in 2009
- Sensors & processing systems: Radar: GEC-Marconi Type 1007 surface search radar; Sonar: Thales Scylla bow and distributed sonar arrays; Thales Karriwarra or Namara towed sonar array; ArgoPhoenix AR-740-US intercept array; Combat system: Modified Raytheon CCS Mk2
- Armament: 6 × 21-inch (530 mm) bow torpedo tubes; Payload: 22 torpedoes, mix of: Mark 48 Mod 7 CBASS torpedoes; UGM-84C Sub-Harpoon anti-ship missiles; Or: 44 Stonefish Mark III mines
- Notes: The sonars and combat system are in the process of being updated across the class, to be completed by 2010. These characteristics represent the updated equipment.

HMAS Farncomb (SSG 74) is the second of six Collins-class submarines operated by the Royal Australian Navy (RAN). Named for Rear Admiral Harold Farncomb, the submarine was laid down in 1993 and launched in December 1995—the first submarine to be completely constructed in Australia. A combination of factors led to Farncomb being the only vessel of her class in operational condition in mid-2009.

== Characteristics ==
The Collins class is an enlarged version of the Västergötland-class submarine designed by Kockums. At 77.42 metres (254.0 ft) in length, with a beam of 7.8 metres (26 ft) and a waterline depth of 7 metres (23 ft), displacing 3,051 tonnes when surfaced, and 3,353 tonnes when submerged, they are the largest conventionally powered submarines in the world. The hull is constructed from high-tensile micro-alloy steel, and are covered in a skin of anechoic tiles to minimise detection by sonar. The depth that they can dive to is classified: most sources claim that it is over 180 metres (590 ft).

The submarine is armed with six 21-inch (530 mm) torpedo tubes, and carry a standard payload of 22 torpedoes: originally a mix of Gould Mark 48 Mod 4 torpedoes and UGM-84C Sub-Harpoon, with the Mark 48s later upgraded to the Mod 7 Common Broadband Advanced Sonar System (CBASS) version.

Each submarine is equipped with three Garden Island-Hedemora HV V18b/15Ub (VB210) 18-cylinder diesel engines, which are each connected to a 1,400 kW, 440-volt DC Jeumont-Schneider generator. The electricity generated is stored in batteries, then supplied to a single Jeumont-Schneider DC motor, which provides 7,200 shaft horsepower to a single, seven-bladed, 4.22-metre (13.8 ft) diameter skewback propeller. The Collins class has a speed of 10.5 knots (19.4 km/h; 12.1 mph) when surfaced and at snorkel depth, and can reach 21 knots (39 km/h; 24 mph) underwater. The submarines have a range of 11,000 nautical miles (20,000 km; 13,000 mi) at 10 knots (19 km/h; 12 mph) when surfaced, 9,000 nautical miles (17,000 km; 10,000 mi) at 10 knots (19 km/h; 12 mph) at snorkel depth. When submerged completely, a Collins-class submarine can travel 32.6 nautical miles (60.4 km; 37.5 mi) at maximum speed, or 480 nautical miles (890 km; 550 mi) at 4 knots (7.4 km/h; 4.6 mph). Each boat has an endurance of 70 days.

== Construction and trials ==
Farncomb was laid down by Australian Submarine Corporation (ASC) on 3 March 1991. She was named for Rear Admiral Harold Farncomb; the first Australian-trained officer promoted to captain, and commanding officer of the flagship HMAS Australia from 1941 to 1944. Work on the boat was delayed by the need to complete sister boat and class lead Collins to a launchable condition by her set launch date of 28 August 1993. To free up resources at ASC for Collins, Farncomb's bow section was sent to Newcastle for completion.

Farncomb was launched on 15 December 1995: as she was the first submarine to be completely constructed in Australia (two sections of Collins had been assembled in Sweden), the submarine wore a large Made In Australia logo on the fin. The submarine commenced sea trials in September 1996. Lessons learned from the trials of lead boat Collins benefitted Farncomb, with training materials improved and the trials crew instructed to familiarise themselves with the submarine while she was being completed (the crew of Collins had the option to, but most personnel did not). The trial program was impacted on by problems with Collins.

Farncomb was provisionally accepted into service by the RAN at the end of 1997. She was formally commissioned into the RAN on 31 January 1998.

== Operational history ==
In May 1997, two groups of six female sailors were posted to Collins and Farncomb as a test on the feasibility of mixed-sex crews aboard submarines. Following the trial's success, eleven female sailors and one female officer commenced training for the submarine service in 1998.

In 1998, while returning from Timor, all three of Farncomb's diesel generators broke down. The submarine limped to Darwin, where she waited several weeks for replacement parts to be organised and transported.

As part of combat system trials, Farncomb fired a live Mark 48 Mod 4 torpedo at HMAS Torrens on 14 June 1999, sinking the decommissioned destroyer escort.

On 19 March 2007, during a five-month intelligence-gathering mission in Asian waters, fishing lines became entangled in Fancomb's propeller. The submarine surfaced in international waters during the night, and five sailors were out on the casing attempting to free the propeller when the weather suddenly worsened and the sailors were washed overboard. A rescue party, involving three volunteer swimmers was successful in retrieving the five sailors during a ninety-minute effort, and the submarine continued on without detection. The incident remained classified until August 2009, when the RAN nominated the three rescue swimmers for bravery decorations, the first submariners to be nominated since a 1981 incident aboard HMAS Onslow.

In 2008 and 2009, personnel shortages reduced the number of submarines able to be deployed to three, with the maintenance schedule and battery malfunctions on several boats combining to reduce this to one, Farncomb in mid-2009.

On the morning of 13 March 2009, Farncomb was one of seventeen warships involved in a ceremonial fleet entry and fleet review in Sydney Harbour, the largest collection of RAN ships since the Australian Bicentenary in 1988. The submarine did not participate in the fleet entry, but was anchored in the harbour for the review.

In January 2010, Farncomb was forced to return to port for urgent repairs after a generator failure. This left sister boat Waller as the only fully operational submarine, with Collins on restricted duties, and the other three submarines undergoing repairs or maintenance.

In August 2011, Farncomb suddenly lost propulsion while using the schnorkel at periscope depth off Rottnest Island. The restart did not function, and the boat began falling backwards. A full emergency ballast blow brought the submarine to the surface, and the engine was restarted.

Farncomb was deployed to Hawaii to participate in the 2012 Rim of the Pacific (RIMPAC) multinational exercise. On 22 July, the submarine fired a Mark 48 torpedo at the former ammunition ship USNS Kilauea, breaking the ship in two and sinking her. A few days later, a hose in the submarine's weight compensation system split while the boat was recharging her batteries, causing flooding. Farncomb surfaced from periscope depth without major incident and sailed to Pearl Harbor for repairs.

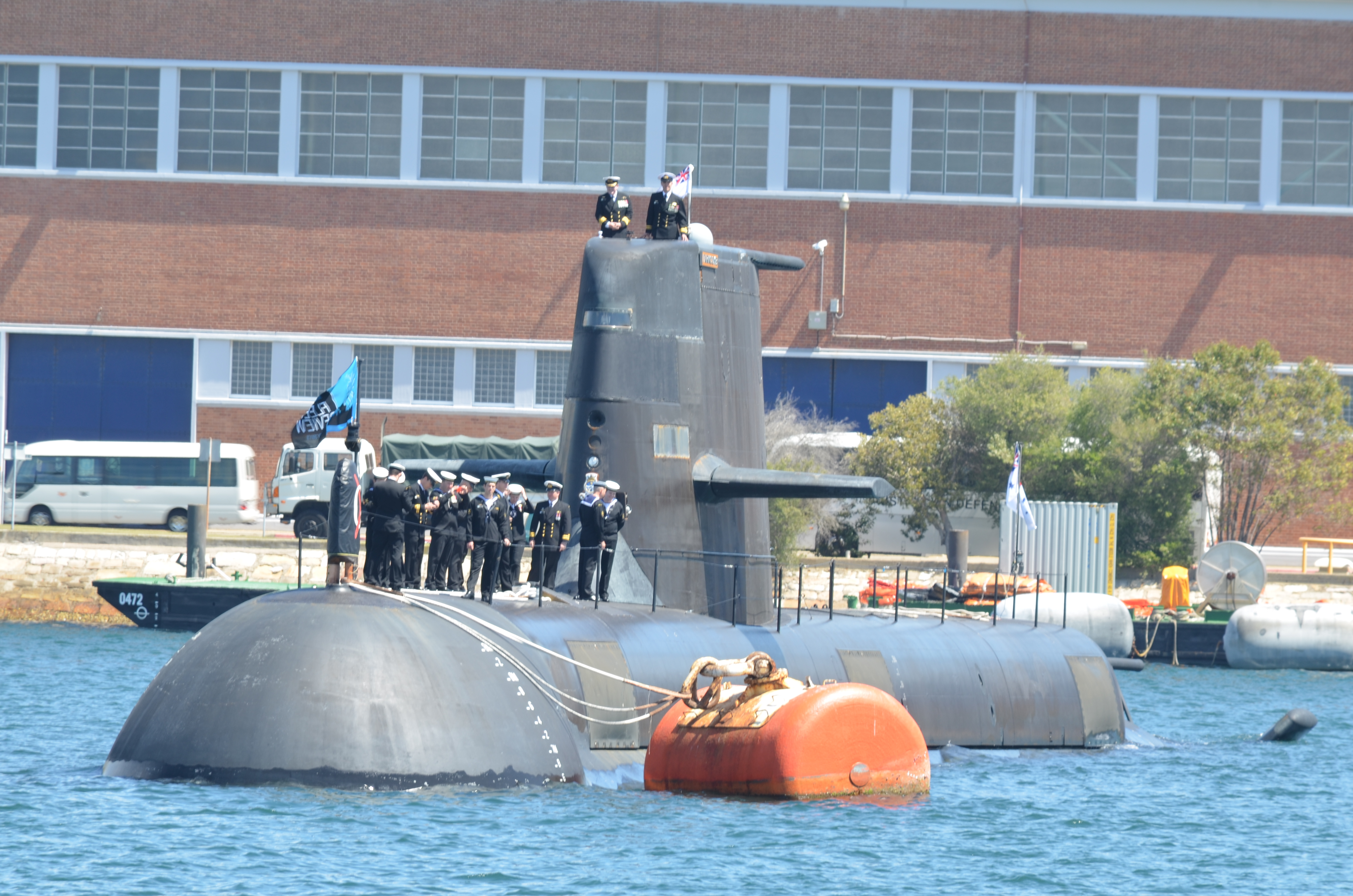
Farncomb moored in Sydney Harbour in October 2013

In October 2013, Farncomb was the only submarine to participate in the International Fleet Review 2013 in Sydney. During November 2013, Farncomb participated in the Black Carillion 2013 submarine escape training exercise. She began a full docking cycle refit in 2014, with most of her crew transferring across to HMAS Rankin. She returned to the Fleet in August 2016.

Farncomb returned to base at Fleet Base West, Rockingham, in August 2019 after a five month deployment during which she participated in the international exercises Bersama Shield, Pacific Vanguard and Talisman Sabre.

In October 2022 Farncomb visited Yokosuka in Japan to participate in an international fleet review organised to mark the 70th anniversary of the Japanese Maritime Self Defense Force.

In September 2023, Farncomb suffered a small electrical fire while on routine patrol. The Australian Defence Forces stated that the crew quickly extinguished the fire and no crew members were injured. The ship continued on patrol.

HMAS Farncomb is expected to undergo sustainment and capability enhancements under the Life-of-Type Extension (LOTE) program in 2026, extending her service life into the 2030s. She will be the first Collins-class submarine to receive the upgrades.

== Bibliography ==
=== Books ===
- Jones, Peter (2001). "A Period of Change and Uncertainty". In Stevens, David (ed.). The Royal Australian Navy. The Australian Centenary History of Defence. Vol. III. South Melbourne, VIC: Oxford University Press. ISBN 0-19-555542-2. OCLC 50418095.
- Spurling, Kathryn (2001). "The Era of Defence Reform". In Stevens, David (ed.). The Royal Australian Navy. The Australian Centenary History of Defence. Vol. III. South Melbourne, VIC: Oxford University Press. ISBN 0-19-555542-2. OCLC 50418095.
- Yule, Peter; Woolner, Derek (2008). The Collins Class Submarine Story: Steel, Spies and Spin. Port Melbourne, VIC: Cambridge University Press. ISBN 978-0-521-86894-5. OCLC 213111359 – via Google Books.
- Wertheim, Eric, ed. (2013). Combat Fleets of the World (16th ed.). Annapolis, Md.: Naval Institute Press. ISBN 978-1-59114-954-5.

=== Journal and news articles ===
- Brooke, Michael (2 April 2009). "Marching into History". Navy News. Department of Defence.
- Brower, J. Michael (June 2000). "The Enemy [Below]... The Brass Above". U.S. Naval Institute Proceedings. 126 (6). United States Naval Institute: 33. ISSN 0041-798X.
- Fish, Tim (8 April 2009). "Australia moves to avert submarine manning crisis". Jane's Navy International. Jane's Information Group.
- Grazebrook, A.W. (1 December 1995). "RAN prepares for Collins class". Jane's Navy International. 100 (6). Jane's Information Group.
- Grazebrook, A.W. (1 January 1998). "Collins class comes up Down Under". Jane's Navy International. 103 (1). Jane's Information Group.
- McPhedran, Ian (21 May 2009). "Only one submarine left to defend Australia". The Advertiser. Archived from the original on 23 May 2009.
- Oakes, Dan (11 February 2010). "Two subs out of action for 9 years". The Age. Fairfax Media. Archived from the original on 21 March 2016.
- Stewart, Cameron (19 September 2009a). "How freak wave hit secret submarine mission of HMAS Farncomb". The Australian. Archived from the original on 23 September 2009.
- Stewart, Cameron (19 September 2009b). "Sailors washed off submarine as rescue kept quiet". The Australian. Archived from the original on 30 September 2009.
- Woolner, Derek (18 September 2001). "Procuring Change: How Kockums was Selected for the Collins Class Submarine" (PDF). Research Paper. 2001–02 (4). Canberra: Department of the Parliamentary Library. ISSN 1328-7478. Archived from the original (PDF) on 13 October 2010.
