= HMAS Rankin =

Diesel-electric submarine of the Australian navy

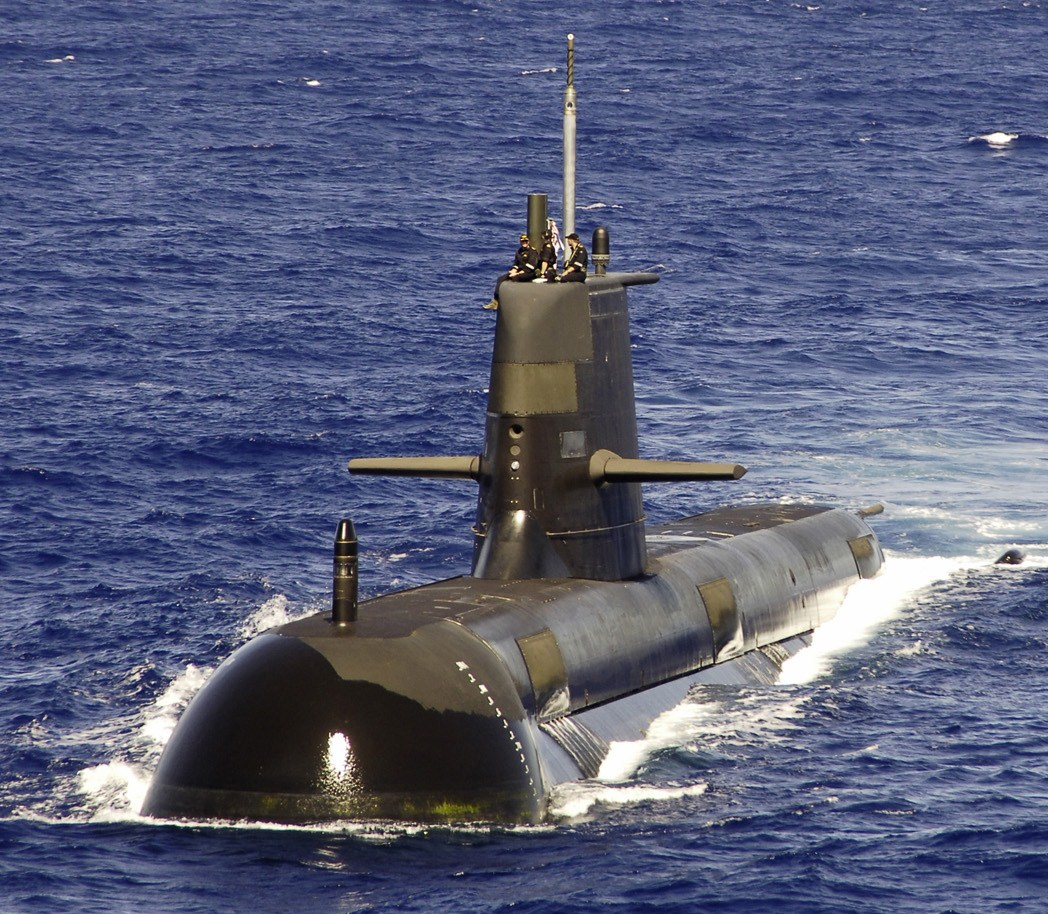
- HMAS Rankin underway in 2006

History

Australia
- Name: Rankin
- Namesake: Lieutenant Commander Robert Rankin
- Builder: Australian Submarine Corporation, Osborne
- Laid down: 12 May 1995
- Launched: 7 November 2001
- Acquired: 18 March 2003
- Commissioned: 29 March 2003
- Home port: Fleet Base West, Perth
- Motto: "Defend the Weak"
- Nickname(s): The Black Knight
- Status: Active as of 2016
- Badge

General characteristics
- Class & type: Collins-class submarine
- Displacement: 3,051 tonnes (surfaced); 3,353 tonnes (submerged)
- Length: 77.42 m (254.0 ft)
- Beam: 7.8 m (26 ft)
- Draught: 7 m (23 ft) at waterline
- Installed power: 3 × Garden Island-Hedemora HV V18b/15Ub (VB210) 18-cylinder diesel motors, 3 × Jeumont-Schneider generators (1,400 kW, 440-volt DC)
- Propulsion: Main: 1 × Jeumont-Schneider DC motor (7,200 shp), driving 1 × seven-bladed, 4.22 m (13.8 ft) diameter skewback propeller; Emergency: 1 × MacTaggart Scott DM 43006 retractable hydraulic motor
- Speed: 10.5 knots (19.4 km/h; 12.1 mph) (surfaced and snorkel depth); 21 knots (39 km/h; 24 mph) (submerged)
- Range: 11,000 nautical miles (20,000 km; 13,000 mi) at 10 knots (19 km/h; 12 mph) (surfaced); 9,000 nautical miles (17,000 km; 10,000 mi) at 10 knots (19 km/h; 12 mph) (snorkel); 32.6 nautical miles (60.4 km; 37.5 mi) at 21 knots (39 km/h; 24 mph) (submerged); 480 nautical miles (890 km; 550 mi) at 4 knots (7.4 km/h; 4.6 mph) (submerged)
- Endurance: 70 days
- Test depth: Over 180 m (590 ft) (actual depth classified)
- Complement: Originally 42 (plus up to 12 trainees); Increased to 58 in 2009
- Sensors & processing systems: Radar: GEC-Marconi Type 1007 surface search radar; Sonar: Thales Scylla bow and distributed sonar arrays; Thales Karriwarra or Namara towed sonar array; ArgoPhoenix AR-740-US intercept array; Combat system: Modified Raytheon CCS Mk2
- Armament: 6 × 21-inch (530 mm) bow torpedo tubes; Payload: 22 torpedoes, mix of: Mark 48 Mod 7 CBASS torpedoes; UGM-84C Sub-Harpoon anti-ship missiles; Or: 44 Stonefish Mark III mines
- Notes: The sonars and combat system have been modernized since its entry into service

HMAS Rankin is the sixth and final submarine of the Collins class, which are operated by the Royal Australian Navy (RAN). Named for Lieutenant Commander Robert William Rankin, the boat was laid down in 1995, and commissioned into the RAN in March 2003, following major delays.

Early in her career, Rankin was the subject of a documentary series and a coffee table book. She was the first submarine since 1987 to be awarded the Gloucester Cup.

== Construction ==
Rankin was laid down by Australian Submarine Corporation on 12 May 1995. The boat was launched on 7 November 2001. She was delivered to the RAN on 18 March 2003 and commissioned on 29 March 2003, 41 months behind schedule, after major delays in the completion and fitting out of the boat due to the diversion of resources to the "fast track" submarines Dechaineux and Sheean and repeated cannibalisation for parts to repair the other five Collins-class boats.

Rankin was named for Lieutenant Commander Robert William Rankin, who died when the ship he commanded, HMAS Yarra, engaged a force of five Japanese warships on 4 March 1942, to allow an Allied convoy to escape. The boat is nicknamed "The Black Knight".

== Characteristics ==
The Collins class is an enlarged version of the Västergötland-class submarine designed by Kockums. At 77.42 metres (254.0 ft) in length, with a beam of 7.8 metres (26 ft) and a waterline depth of 7 metres (23 ft), displacing 3,051 tonnes when surfaced, and 3,353 tonnes when submerged, they are the largest conventionally powered submarines in the world. The hull is constructed from high-tensile micro-alloy steel, and are covered in a skin of anechoic tiles to minimise detection by sonar. The depth that they can dive to is classified: most sources claim that it is over 180 metres (590 ft),

The submarine is armed with six 21-inch (530 mm) torpedo tubes, and carry a standard payload of 22 torpedoes: originally a mix of Gould Mark 48 Mod 4 torpedoes and UGM-84C Sub-Harpoon, with the Mark 48s later upgraded to the Mod 7 Common Broadband Advanced Sonar System (CBASS) version.

Each submarine is equipped with three Garden Island-Hedemora HV V18b/15Ub (VB210) 18-cylinder diesel engines, which are each connected to a 1,400 kW, 440-volt DC Jeumont-Schneider generator. The electricity generated is stored in batteries, then supplied to a single Jeumont-Schneider DC motor, which provides 7,200 shaft horsepower to a single, seven-bladed, 4.22-metre (13.8 ft) diameter skewback propeller. The Collins class has a speed of 10.5 knots (19.4 km/h; 12.1 mph) when surfaced and at snorkel depth, and can reach 21 knots (39 km/h; 24 mph) underwater. The submarines have a range of 11,000 nautical miles (20,000 km; 13,000 mi) at 10 knots (19 km/h; 12 mph) when surfaced, 9,000 nautical miles (17,000 km; 10,000 mi) at 10 knots (19 km/h; 12 mph) at snorkel depth. When submerged completely, a Collins class submarine can travel 32.6 nautical miles (60.4 km; 37.5 mi) at maximum speed, or 480 nautical miles (890 km; 550 mi) at 4 knots (7.4 km/h; 4.6 mph). Each boat has a endurance of 70 days.

== Operational history ==
During a multinational exercise in September 2003, which was attended by Rankin and sister boat Waller, Rankin successfully "sank" a Singaporean anti-submarine warfare vessel.

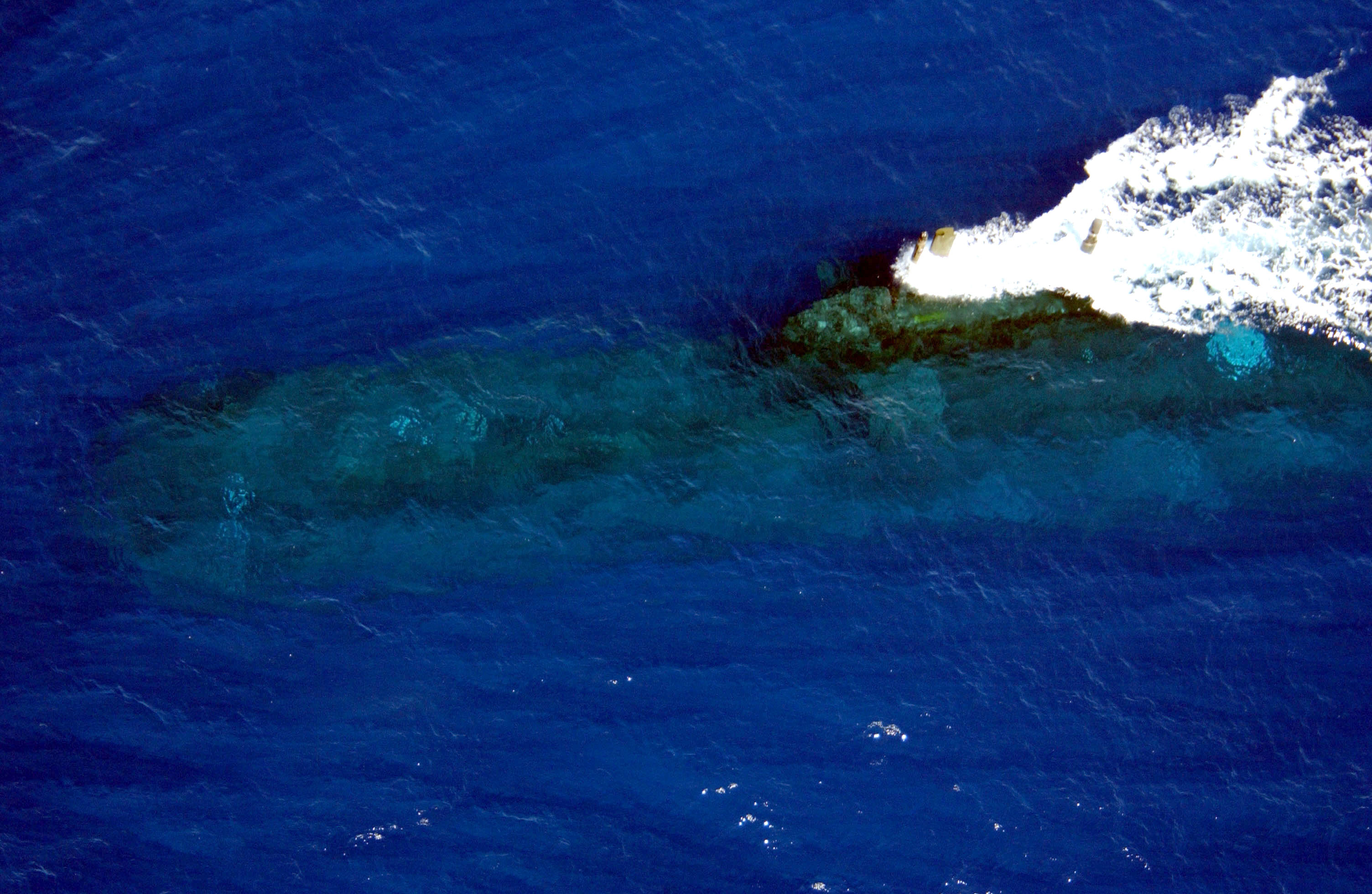
Rankin underway at periscope depth during the boat's participation in RIMPAC 04

In 2004, a film crew was embarked aboard Rankin for the creation of Submariners, a six-part documentary aired by SBS in 2005 and depicting life aboard a submarine. The film crew was on board from February to April 2004, during which the boat completed pre-deployment trials, participated in the submarine rescue exercise Pacific Reach, and made a diplomatic visit to Kure, Japan. They later rejoined Rankin during the submarine's deployment to Hawaii for RIMPAC 04 in June and July. Later that year, Rankin was also the subject of the book Beneath Southern Seas. The coffee table book, which encompasses the history of the Royal Australian Navy Submarine Service, was primarily based on photographs and interviews of Rankin and those aboard taken by the authors during a twelve-day voyage from Sydney to Fremantle, concluding the six-month deployment started during the filming of Submariners. The 20,000 nautical miles (37,000 km; 23,000 mi) voyage—the longest undertaken by a Collins-class submarine to that date—began with workups in February, and saw the submarine visit Korea, Japan, and Hawaii, and participate in various multinational exercises before returning to Fremantle via Sydney. Rankin was at sea for 126 days, 80% of which was spent underwater.

On 10 June 2005, Rankin was presented with the Gloucester Cup. Presented to the RAN vessel with the greatest overall efficiency over the previous twelve months, Rankin was the first Collins-class submarine to earn the Cup, and the first submarine to receive it since Orion in 1987. The award was again presented to Rankin in 2008.

Rankin was docked for a long maintenance period in 2008, but workforce shortages and malfunctions on other submarines requiring urgent attention have drawn this out: in 2010 RAN and ASC officials predicted that she would not be back in service until 2013. At the end of the works on Rankin, personnel were transferred from HMAS Farncomb (which was commencing a similar period of maintenance and upgrades), and Rankin arrived at Fleet Base West on 1 October 2014.
