= Collins-class submarine =

Australian underwater naval vessel

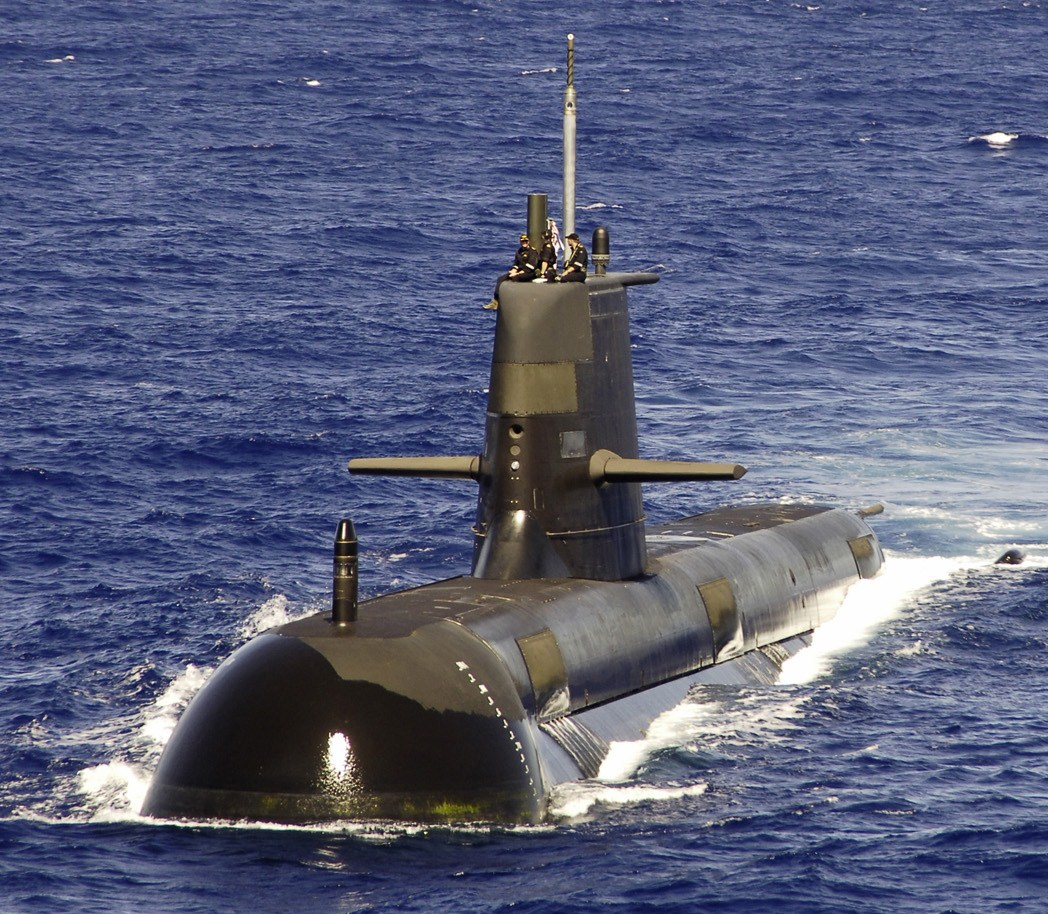
- HMAS Rankin, sixth submarine of the Collins class, underway in 2006

Class overview
- Builders: Australian Submarine Corporation; Kockums; Civmec
- Operators: Royal Australian Navy
- Preceded by: Oberon class
- Succeeded by: Attack class (cancelled); Virginia class and SSN-AUKUS (planned)
- Cost: A$5.1 billion (1999) for 6 units; A$850 million (1999) per unit
- Built: 14 February 1990–18 March 2003
- In commission: 27 July 1996–present
- Completed: 6
- Active: 6

General characteristics
- Type: Diesel-electric submarine
- Displacement: 3,100 tonnes (3,100 long tons) (surfaced); 3,407 tonnes (3,353 long tons) (submerged)
- Length: 77.42 m (254.0 ft)
- Beam: 7.8 m (26 ft)
- Draught: 7 m (23 ft) at waterline
- Installed power: 3 × Garden Island-Hedemora HV V18b/15Ub (VB210) 18-cylinder diesel motors, 3 × Jeumont-Schneider generators (1,400 kW, 440-volt DC)
- Propulsion: Main: 1 × Jeumont-Schneider DC motor (7,200 hp or 5,400 kW), driving 1 × seven-bladed, 4.22 m (13.8 ft) diameter skewback propeller; Emergency: 1 × MacTaggart Scott DM 43006 retractable hydraulic motor
- Speed: 10 knots (19 km/h; 12 mph) surfaced and periscope depth; 20 kn (37 km/h; 23 mph) submerged
- Range: 11,500 nautical miles (21,300 km; 13,200 mi) at 10 knots (19 km/h; 12 mph) surfaced; 9,000 nmi (17,000 km; 10,000 mi) at 10 kn (19 km/h; 12 mph) periscope; 480 nmi (890 km; 550 mi) at 4 kn (7.4 km/h; 4.6 mph) submerged
- Endurance: 70 days
- Test depth: Over 180 m (590 ft) – actual depth classified
- Complement: Originally 42 (plus up to 12 trainees); Increased to 58 in 2009
- Sensors & processing systems: Sonar: Thomson Sintra Scylla bow and distributed sonar arrays; Thales SHORT-TAS towed sonar array; Thales intercept array; Radar: Kelvin Hughes Type 1007 surface search radar; Periscopes: Thales CK043 search periscope; Thales CH093 attack periscope; Combat system: Modified Raytheon CCS Mk2 (AN/BYG-1)
- Electronic warfare & decoys: Condor CS-5600 ESM; 2 × SSE decoys
- Armament: 6 × 21-inch (530 mm) bow torpedo tubes; Payload: 22 torpedoes, mix of: Mark 48 Mod 7 CBASS torpedoes; UGM-84C Sub-Harpoon anti-ship missiles; Or: RWM Italia smart sea mines

The Collins-class submarines are Australian-built diesel-electric submarines operated by the Royal Australian Navy (RAN). The Collins class takes its name from Australian Vice Admiral John Augustine Collins; each of the six submarines is named after significant RAN personnel who distinguished themselves in action during World War II. The six vessels were the first submarines built in Australia, prompting widespread improvements in Australian industry and delivering a sovereign (Australian controlled) sustainment/maintenance capability.

Planning for a new design to replace the RAN's Oberon-class submarines began in the late 1970s and early 1980s. Proposals were received from seven companies; two were selected for a funded study to determine the winning design, which was announced in mid-1987. The submarines, enlarged versions of Swedish shipbuilder Kockums' Västergötland class and originally referred to as the Type 471, were constructed between 1990 and 2003 in South Australia by the Australian Submarine Corporation (ASC).

The submarines have been the subject of many incidents and technical problems since the design phase, including accusations of foul play and bias during the design selection, improper handling of design changes during construction, major capability deficiencies in the first submarines, and ongoing technical problems throughout the early life of the class. These problems have been compounded by the inability of the RAN to retain sufficient personnel to operate the submarines—by 2008, only three could be crewed, and between 2009 and 2012, on average two or fewer were fully operational. The resulting negative press has led to a poor public perception of the Collins class. After 20 years of service issues, the boats have eventually provided high availability to the RAN since 2016.

The Collins class was expected to be retired about 2026; however, the 2016 Defence White Paper extended this into the 2030s. The Collins class life will now be extended and will receive an unplanned capability upgrade, including sonar and communications.

The initial replacement for the Collins-class was to be a conventionally-powered version of the SSN Suffren-class submarine, the Shortfin Barracuda-class submarine, proposed by Naval Group of France and dubbed the Attack-class submarine.

On 15 September 2021, the Australian government announced the cancellation of the contract with Naval Group, and that the replacement will be at least eight nuclear-powered submarines armed with conventional weapons acquired through the new AUKUS security partnership with the United Kingdom and the United States.

== Development and design ==
The proposal for a new type of submarine to replace the Oberon class of diesel-electric submarines began in July 1978, when the RAN director of submarine policy prepared a paper detailing the need to start considering a replacement for the ageing Oberons. The paper also raised the suggestion that the majority of the submarines be constructed in Australia and that the number of submarines be increased beyond the six Oberons. Building the submarines in Australia was initially met with reactions predicting an impossible task because of the poor state of the Australian shipbuilding industry, and Australian industry in general, although campaigning by several figures in Australian industry who thought it could be done came to the attention of those spearheading the project to design the Oberon-class replacement, and led to the view that it was both possible and feasible. The campaign to build submarines in Australia was also met with support from the Australian Labor Party and several trade unions.

The proposal was accepted by the defence operational requirements committee in August 1978, and the project was given the procurement designation of SEA 1114. Approval for the development phase of the project was given in the 1981–82 federal budget. The RAN had four main requirements: that the submarines were tailored to operating conditions in the Australasian region, that they be equipped with a combat system advanced enough to promote a long service life, that appropriate and sustainable infrastructure be established in Australia to construct the boats, then provide maintenance and technical support for their operational lifespan, and that the submarines were capable of peacetime and emergency operations in addition to their hunter-killer role. Ten submarines were envisioned, a number which was revised to between four and eight boats by the start of 1983, and later settled on the acquisition of six submarines, with the option to order two more.

=== Requests for tenders ===
The development of the submarine commenced in May 1983, when the government released a request for tender and approached seven of the world's nine diesel-electric submarine manufacturers for submissions. The submissions would be narrowed down to two based on the provided information, with these undergoing a funded study to determine the winning design. Tendering companies had to demonstrate how Australian industries would be incorporated into the project, and that they were willing to establish an Australia-based consortium to construct the submarines. All seven companies responded by the end of the year: the combined submissions totalling four tonnes (9,000 lb) of paper.

- Directions Techniques Des Constructions Naval of France originally supplied a design modified from the Agosta class, but the submission review board did not view this favourably, as the submarine was of the same vintage as the Oberons. Their submission was altered to a conventionally powered version of the Rubis-class nuclear submarine.
- The German companies Ingenieur Kontor Lübeck (IKL) and Howaldtswerke-Deutsche Werft (HDW) collaborated to offer an enlarged version of the Type 209 submarine, designated the Type 2000. Submarines based on the Type 209 design had been exported to several nations, but were not operated by the German Navy.
- Thyssen Nordseewerke, another German company, offered their TR-1700-class submarine. Like the Type 209, the TR-1700 was an export-only submarine design.
- Cantieri Navali Riuniti of Italy proposed a design based on their Sauro-class submarine, scaled up by 25%. The age of the early 1970s design was a concern, and the proposal was withdrawn early in the process.
- The Dutch partnership of United Shipbuilder Bureaux and Rotterdamsche Droogdok Maatschappij submitted the Walrus class. Their offer was identical to that constructed for the Royal Netherlands Navy, minus the Dutch combat system.
- Swedish shipbuilder Kockums submitted the Type 471 design, an enlarged version of the Västergötland-class submarine operated by the Swedish Navy.
- The United Kingdom company Vickers Shipbuilding & Engineering offered a design referred to as the Type 2400, that later became the Upholder class.

The review board concluded that the IKL/HDW Type 2000 was the best design offered, the Walrus class was rated as 'fair', while Kockums' and Vickers' proposals were considered 'marginal' contenders. However, none of the tenders completely matched the desired RAN specifications, and the two proposals selected would have to be redesigned during the funded study.

The combat data system was procured separately to the submarine design; 14 companies were identified as capable of providing what the RAN wanted, from which eight were approached in January 1983 with a separate request for tender. Five responded: a consortium led by Rockwell International of the United States, Plessey of the United Kingdom, Signaal of the Netherlands, Sintra Alcatel of France, and a collaboration between the German Krupp Atlas Elektronik and the British Ferranti. Each tender was required to offer a system with a distributed architecture, despite the absence of an accepted definition for 'distributed computing' at that time, and had to show the cost of programming the software in Ada, although they could offer additional cost breakdowns for other programming languages.

=== Funded studies ===
By May 1985, three months behind schedule, the review board narrowed the tenders down to two contenders in each group: IKL/HDW and Kockums for the submarine, Rockwell and Signaal for the combat system. The Walrus and Type 2400 submarine designs were considered to be too expensive to manufacture because of inefficient building practices, while the combat data system tenders had been narrowed down by unjustified development risk in the Plessey and Krupp/Ferranti proposals, and the dual problems in the Sintra Alcatel tender of excessive power usage and incompatibility with the proposed American weapons system. On 9 May, the Australian cabinet approved the selections for the funded studies and decided that six submarines would be built, with the option for two more, all in Australia.

The companies were granted funding for project definition studies, from which the final selections would be made. Liaison teams were sent to each of the four companies to observe the development of the concepts presented in the initial proposals. As part of this process, the two submarine designers were required to establish a consortium with at least 50% Australian ownership: IKL/HDW joined with Eglo Engineering to form Australian Marine Systems, while Kockums (which had originally planned to work with Eglo) became part of a joint venture with the Australian branch of Chicago Bridge & Iron, Wormald International, and the Australian Industry Development Corporation to create the Australian Submarine Corporation.

During the study, various accusations of foul play by or unsuitability of both submarine designers were made by Australian politicians and the media. These included claims that the centre-left Australian Labor Party (ALP) and the Swedish Social Democratic Party, both in power at the time, would lead to a pro-Kockums bias, investigations into perceived coaching of IDL/HDW representatives in the questions to be asked at an ALP Caucus briefing session on the project, and public emphasis on security incidents in both Sweden and West Germany. These incidents either lacked supporting evidence or were proven false, and were the result of the Liberal Party attempting to discredit the Labor government, or pro-British politicians and organisations who believed both submarines were inferior to the Vickers Type 2400 offering.

The Dibb Report on the state of the Australian Defence Force was released in March 1986; it included advice that if the submarine project cost increased too much, the boats' capabilities should be scaled back to save money. Around the same time, Federal Treasurer Paul Keating began efforts to tighten fiscal policy and cut government spending across all portfolios. Consequently, despite his enthusiastic support for the project as a means to improve Australia's defence and industrial capabilities, Minister for Defence Kim Beazley advised the project heads that he would not be able to secure Cabinet approval for construction of the submarines if the predicted cost "started with a 4 [A$4 billion]".

=== Evaluation and final selection ===
The four tenders resulting from the study were submitted during October and November 1986. Although the IKL/HDW design was rated highest during the initial inspection, the evaluation team found that the German proposal was less attractive than previously thought. Although IKL/HDW claimed that their boat could meet the RAN's performance requirements, the evaluators concluded from the information provided that doing so would require the deactivation of all non-essential and some essential systems. Conversely, Kockums' proposal conceded that they did not meet the requirements, although evaluators found that the figures failed by only narrow margins, and believed that these were conservative. The evaluation team recalculated the capability statistics for both submarines to a common baseline, portraying the predicted Australian operating conditions, which generally saw Kockums' figures revised upwards, and those from IKL/HDW downwards. This resulted in growing support for the Type 471 bid, and outcries from the IKL and HDW groups, which questioned the validity of the recalculations and if the Australian evaluators had the experience to do this correctly.

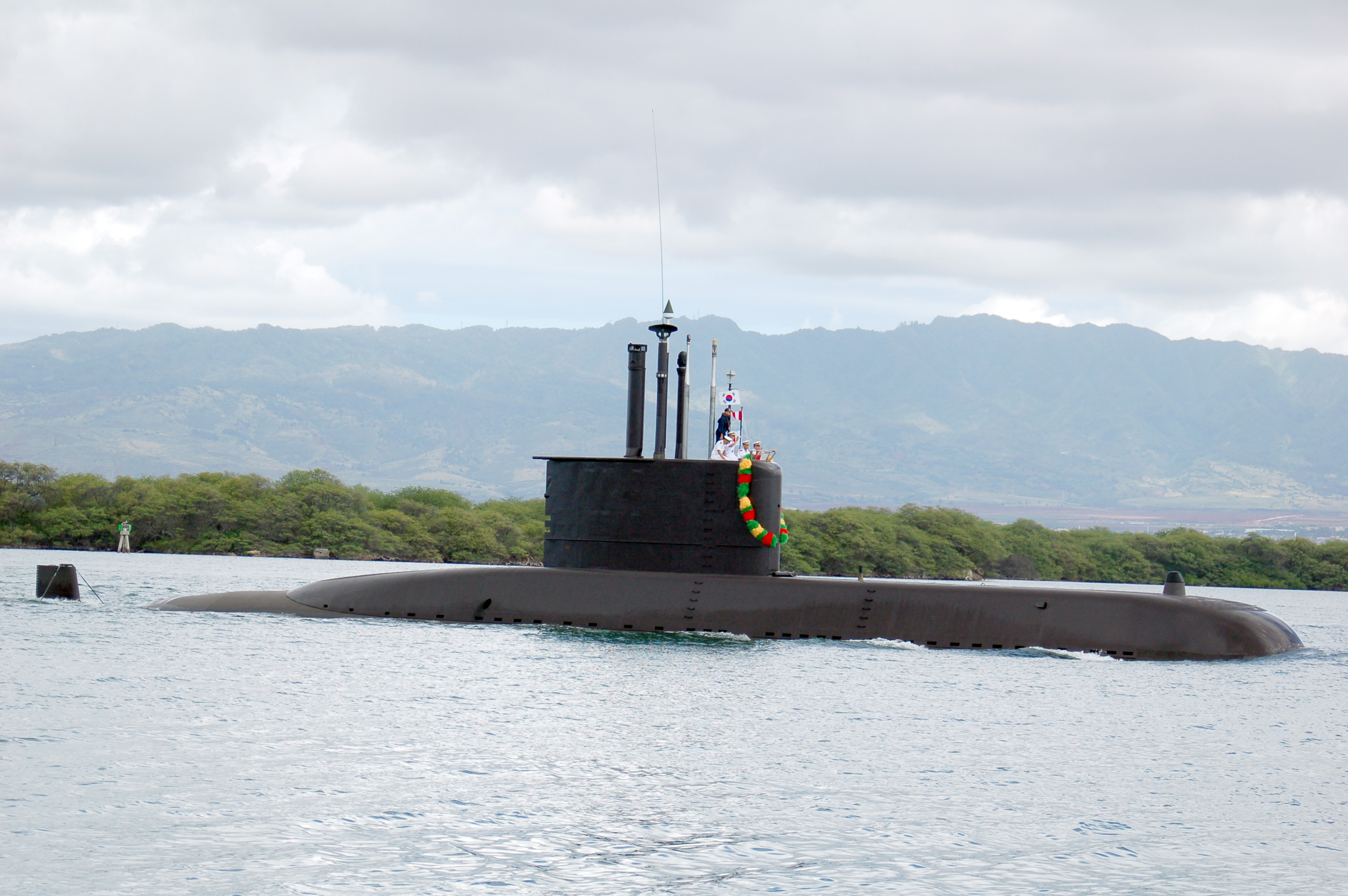
ROKS Lee Sunsin, a South Korean submarine based on the IKL/HDW Type 209 design. The Type 209 unsuccessfully competed against the Kockums Type 471 for selection as the basis of the Collins class

Analysis of the two combat system proposals saw Signaal fall out of favour with the tender reviewers. This was primarily attributed to a cost-reducing re-design late in the process: the changes were not fully documented because of time constraints. Supporting documentation was further criticised by the reviewers for being vaguely worded and not using milspec terminology and standards. In addition, the system proposed by Rockwell appeared to have greater performance capabilities, and would be cheaper to implement.

On 18 May 1987, the Australian Cabinet approved the final design: Kockums' Type 471 submarine, fitted with the Rockwell combat system and Diesel-Electric propulsion units provided by the French engineering firm Jeumont-Schneider. The contract for construction of six submarines was signed on 3 June and valued at A$3.9 billion in 1986 prices, with allowances for inflation and the changing value of the Australian dollar. The submarine acquisition project was at the time the most expensive project ever undertaken by the Australian Defence Force, but was unseated from this title by the Anzac-class frigate project a few years later.

== Construction ==
The Australian Submarine Corporation construction facility was established on previously undeveloped land on the bank of the Port River, at Osborne, South Australia. Work on the site began on 29 June 1987, and it was opened in November 1989. South Australia was selected as the site of the construction facility based on the proposed location of the facility and promises by the State Government to help minimise any problems caused by workers' unions. The state's bid was aided by careful promotion to both Kockums and IKL/HDW during early in the project, and problems with the other states' proposals: Tasmania and Western Australia lacked the necessary industrial base, New South Wales could not decide on the location of the construction facility, Victoria's proposed site was poorly sited, and building in Liberal-led Queensland would have been politically unwise for the project when Labor was in power both federally and in all other states.

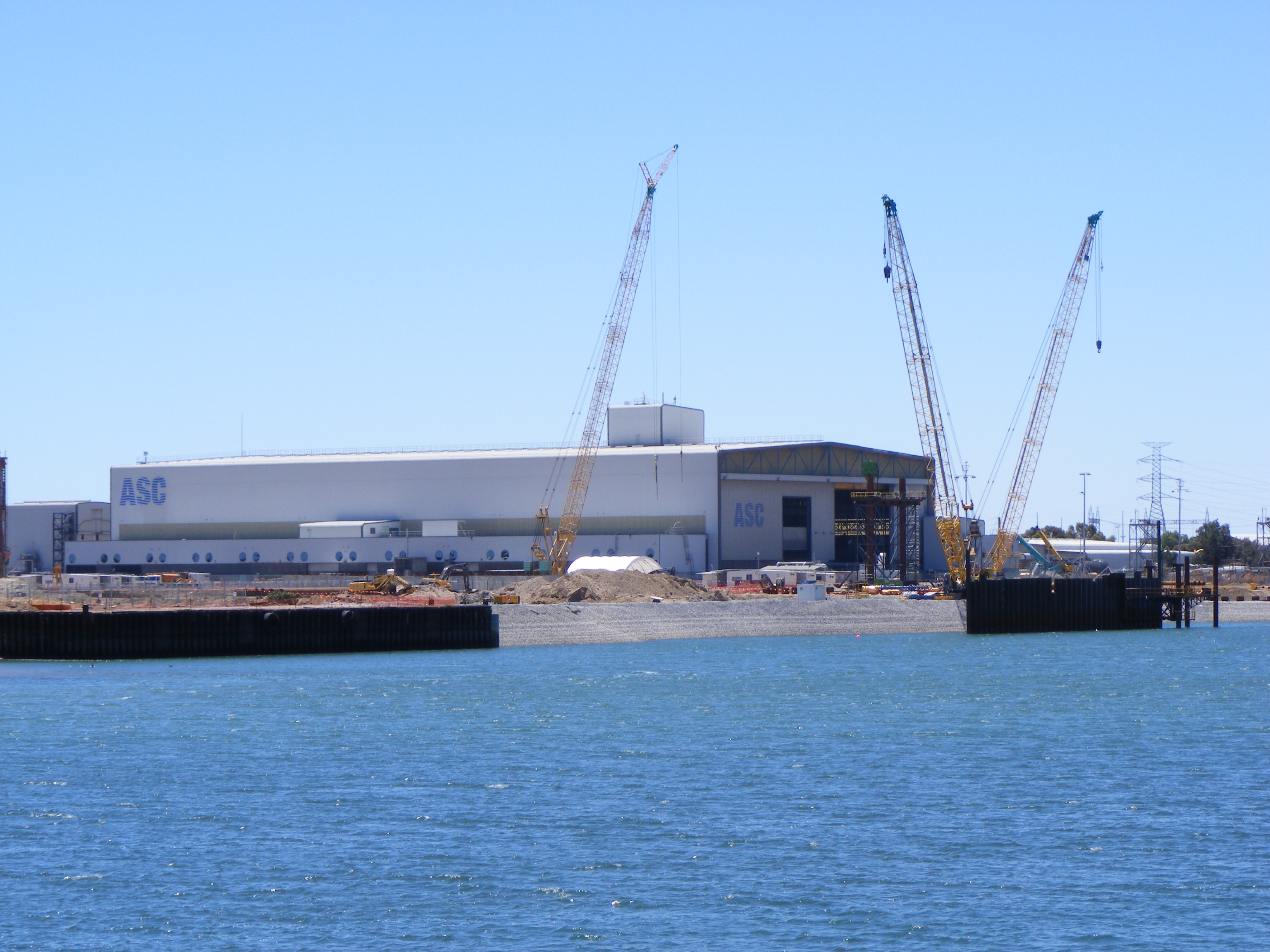
The Australian Submarine Corporation construction facility, where the six submarines were assembled

Each submarine was constructed in six sections, each consisting of several sub-sections. One of the main criteria of the project was that Australian industries contribute to at least 60% of the work; by the conclusion of the project 70% of the construction and 45% of the software preparation had been completed by Australian-owned companies. Work was sub-contracted out to 426 companies across twelve countries, plus numerous sub-sub-contractors. In many cases, components for the first submarine were constructed by companies outside Australia, while those for the following five boats were replicated by an Australian-owned partner or subsidiary. The project prompted major increases in quality control standards across Australian industries: in 1980, only 35 Australian companies possessed the appropriate quality control certifications for Defence projects, but by 1998 this had increased to over 1,500.

Although the acquisition project organisers originally planned for the first submarine to be constructed overseas, the Cabinet decided as part of the project's approval that all six submarines would be built in Australia; the increases in construction time and cost from not building the lead ship in the winning designer's home shipyard was considered to be offset by the additional experience provided to Australian industries. Even so, two sections of the first submarine were constructed by Kockums' shipyard in Malmo, Sweden.

By the end of 1990, Chicago Bridge & Iron and Wormald International had both sold their shares in ASC. The shares were bought up by Kockums and the Australian Industry Development Corporation, with some of Kockums' shares then sold to James Hardie Industries to maintain an Australian majority ownership of the company. On 5 April 2000, the shares in ASC held by Kockums were bought out and the company was nationalised, despite a trend at the time to privatise government-owned companies. At the end of 2003, a contract to maintain the Collins class worth $3.5 billion over 25 years was awarded to ASC.

As of April 1996, the option to order the seventh and eighth submarines was still under consideration, but was looked on unfavourably by the Department of Defence at the time, as the additional cost would require the diversion of funding from the Australian Army and Royal Australian Air Force, resulting in an imbalance in the capabilities of the Australian Defence Force. The option was cancelled outright by late 2001.

=== Entry into service ===
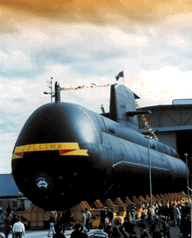
Launching of HMAS Collins, lead boat and namesake of the class, on 28 August 1993

The first submarine, HMAS Collins, was laid down in February 1990. Collins' launch was originally planned for 1994, but was later set for 28 August 1993. Although launched on schedule, she was not complete: the design of the submarine had not been finalised, important internal pipes and fittings were not installed, the components of the combat system had yet to be delivered, and some hull sections were actually sheets of timber painted black so the submarine would appear complete in photographs of the launching ceremony. Within weeks of the launch, Collins was removed from the water, and it was not until June 1994 that the submarine was completed. Progress on the other five submarines was delayed by the extra effort required to meet Collins' launching date and the subsequent work to complete her. Collins was not commissioned into the RAN until 27 July 1996; eighteen months behind schedule, because of several delays and problems, most relating to the provision and installation of the combat data system software. Collins was not approved for operational deployments until 2000.

The other five submarines were scheduled for completion at 12-month intervals. However, the series of defects and problems encountered during sea trials of the submarines (particularly Collins) resulted in the repeated diversion of resources from those still under construction, adding to delays. Consequently, delivery of the submarines ran significantly behind schedule; submarines were presented to the RAN between 21 and 41 months late, and the entire class was not cleared for full operational service until March 2004, a year after the last boat was commissioned. These delays forced the RAN to keep several Oberon-class submarines and the submarine base HMAS Platypus in service beyond their planned decommissioning dates.

=== McIntosh-Prescott Report and Fast Track program ===
Following his appointment as Minister for Defence following the 1998 federal election, John Moore decided that the only way to solve the various problems of the Collins class was for an independent report to be prepared on them. He appointed Malcolm McIntosh, chief executive of the CSIRO and an unofficial advisor to Moore, and John Prescott, a former BHP director, to investigate the project, uncover the problems with the submarines, and suggest ways of solving them.

The Report to the Minister for Defence on the Collins class submarine and related matters (commonly referred to as the McIntosh-Prescott Report) was compiled in ten weeks, and released on 1 June 1999. This report concluded that the Collins class was incapable of performing at the required level for military operations. Although the report highlighted several elements of the submarine design that performed to or beyond expectations, and acknowledged that many of the publicised problems had been or were in the process of being fixed, it presented the propulsion system, combat system, and excessive noise as ongoing problems across the class. After identifying the combat system as the central problem, McIntosh and Prescott recommended that it be scrapped entirely and replaced with a system based on commercially available equipment and software. They also claimed that these problems were caused by poor design and manufacture; inappropriate design requirements; deficiencies in the structure of the contract, particularly with regards to modifying the contract to meet changing requirements; and problems between the various parties involved in the construction of the submarines, with a lack of overall direction and conflicts of interest causing avoidable hostility and uncooperativeness. Despite the report being promoted by the government as 'ground-breaking', many people involved with the Collins-class project later claimed that large sections of the report could have been copied from reports previously submitted by the RAN or ASC.

The report, along with the planned December 2000 decommissioning of the final Oberon-class submarine, Otama, prompted the establishment of an A$1 billion program to bring the fourth and fifth submarines (Dechaineux and Sheean) up to operational standards, then retrofit the modifications to the other boats. Referred to as the "fast track" or "get well" program, the program also included solving the problems preventing various parties from cooperating fully, and improving the negative media coverage and public perception of the class by responding to criticism and providing more information to reporters.

== Submarines in class ==
Name	Pennant	Laid down	Launched	Delivered	Commissioned	Namesake
Collins	S73	14 February 1990	28 August 1993	15 July 1996 (18 months late)	27 July 1996	Vice Admiral Sir John Collins KBE, CB
Farncomb	S74	1 March 1991	15 December 1995	15 December 1997 (22 months late)	31 January 1998	Rear Admiral Harold Farncomb CB, DSO, MVO
Waller	S75	19 March 1992	14 March 1997	30 April 1999 (27 months late)	10 July 1999	Captain Hector Waller DSO and Bar
Dechaineux	S76	4 March 1993	12 March 1998	21 July 2000 (31 months late)	23 February 2001	Captain Emile Dechaineux DSC
Sheean	S77	17 February 1994	1 May 1999	25 August 2000 (21 months late)	23 February 2001	Ordinary Seaman Edward Sheean VC
Rankin	S78	12 May 1995	26 November 2001	18 March 2003 (41 months late)	29 March 2003	Lieutenant Commander Robert Rankin

== Problems during construction and trials ==
The Collins-class submarines experienced a wide range of problems during their construction and early service life. Many of these were attributed to the submarines being a new, untested design, and were successfully addressed as they were discovered. Most systems and features worked with few or no problems, while the boats' maximum speed, manoeuvrability, and low-speed submerged endurance were found to exceed specifications. The ship control system, which during development had been marked as a major potential problem, functioned beyond positive expectation: for example, the autopilot (which aboard Collins was nicknamed 'Sven') was found to be better at maintaining depth during snorting than most helmsmen.

However, problems with the combat system, excessive noise, and engine breakdowns were recurring and appeared across the entire class. These and other shortcomings were often made harder to solve by disagreements between Kockums, ASC, Rockwell, the RAN, and the Australian Government over the nature of problems, their causes, and who was responsible for solving them. Media reporting of the problems during the mid-1990s was often negative and exaggerated, creating poor public perception. This was aided by politicians, who used the shortcomings to politically attack the Labor Party and Kim Beazley, particularly after Labor was defeated by the Liberal-National Coalition in the 1996 federal election, and Beazley became Leader of the Opposition. During the mid-1990s, it was recommended on several occasions that the submarine project be abandoned, and the completed submarines and incomplete hulls be broken up for scrap.

Following the McIntosh-Prescott Report, which indicated the long-term faults with the class that still required solving, successful efforts were made to bring the submarines to operational standard. As part of this, a public relations plan was implemented to provide up-to-date information on the submarines to the media, to improve the public perception of the class by providing factual information on the status of the project and responding to queries and incidents. This same period saw the dispelling of the idea, widely held within the RAN, that the Collins-class boats would be like any other vessel previously ordered by the RAN: in service with another navy, well tested, and with all the problems solved before they entered Australian hands. The RAN began to realise that as the parent navy for the class, they had a greater responsibility than normal in ensuring that the boats were at an operational standard.

=== Welding of Collins ===
During assembly of Collins' bow and escape tower sections in Sweden, multiple defects in the hull welding were discovered. Different reasons were given by different parties for the problems: to speed production, Kockums employed welders who were not qualified to work on high strength steels; the Qualified Welding Procedures developed by Kockums for these steels were not followed in production; the steel alloy used for the hull required different welding techniques to those normally used by Kockums; the Swedish navy always requested partial penetration welds for their submarines, while the RAN wanted full penetration welding, but had not made this clear; delays in delivering the steel plates to Kockums resulted in rushed work and a resulting drop in quality. Kockums engineers proposed that the section be kept in Sweden for repairs, but to minimise delays it was accepted as-is, with repairs attempted at ASC during full assembly of the first boat. Kockums sent welders and inspection technicians to ASC in order to assist in undertaking these repairs.

However, when Collins returned to the ASC facility in April 2001 for a year-long maintenance docking, multiple welding defects were found in the bow and escape tower sections of the submarine (the two sections constructed by Kockums), while almost no problems were found in the welding of the four Australian-built sections. Repairing these welds quadrupled the time Collins spent in dock.

=== Noise signature ===
The noise made by the submarines, which compromised their ability to stay hidden, was another major problem with the design. In the original requisition, the RAN guidelines for the noise signature of the new submarines were vague; for example, asking that they be "twice as quiet" as the Oberons. Expectations and operational requirements also changed between the 1987 contract signing and when the submarines began operating in the late 1990s. The major element of the noise signature for the Oberon class was machinery noise transmitted through the hull; this was successfully avoided during construction of the Collins class by mounting machinery on platforms isolated from the hull.

Noise testing during 1996 and 1997 found that the hydrodynamic noise signature—the noise made by a submarine passing through the water—was excessive, particularly at high speed. The shape of the hull was the main cause: although a scale model of the design had been tested during the funded study and was found to have a minimal signature, the hull shape was changed after the contract was signed, primarily by a 2-metre (6.6 ft) lengthening of the submarine and a redesign of the bow dome to accommodate the larger-than-expected main sonar and reduce its blind spot (the baffles). The design had not been retested, as who would pay for this could not be agreed on. Propeller cavitation, caused by water flow over control surfaces onto the propeller at certain speeds, was the other main noisemaker. Cavitation had not been a problem with earlier Swedish submarine designs or during early testing of the Type 471 design, but the propeller had to be redesigned late in the process to provide more power, and like the redesigned hull, was not retested.

During the year 2000, an unusual meeting took place with a next door neighbour (Francis 'Frank' Smith) of the then HMAS Stirling Naval Base commander. He was an Aircraft Maintenance Engineer (originally trained at Government Aircraft Factories Fisherman's bend) who had been aware of the fluid dynamics issues of the Collins class for some time, purely by interest and observation on television. After a lengthy discussion, he was invited to discuss and demonstrate where possible, his observations at the Stirling Naval Base with Navy and Defence Science and Technology Organisation (DSTO) staff who were there at that time as part of an investigative group. He showed on a white board the aerofoil issue with the dorsal-sail conning tower structure, showing that the aspect ratio (span (length) to chord (width)) was too short and that severe turbulence / cavitation would be generated by such a design. This was demonstrated again on the white board using aircraft aerofoil wing shapes as a basis for the discussion. That the turbulence / cavitation generated would, by natural rearward flow, move down the rear upper surface deck of the hull and be drawn into the propeller. He was also able to demonstrate that the design of the bow section would not pass a flow test for generated turbulence / cavitation, with the change in shape from circular bow section to long hull, being ill-conceived. He made recommendations that would be cost-effective and possible: (1) to lengthen and taper the dorsal fin and create a more streamlined integration of the dorsal to flat upper hull deck section; and (2) to 'fill in' the hollow section of hull aft of the bow curvature. Both these could be achieved with carbon fibre or fibreglass covers, as no load bearing strength would be required. Subsequent studies by the DSTO showed that the submarine's hull shape, particularly the redesigned sonar dome, the fin, and the rear of the submarine, focused the displaced water into two turbulent streams; when the seven propeller blades hit these streams, the propeller's vibration was increased, causing cavitation. These problems were fixed by modifying the casing of the submarine with fibreglass fairings.

=== Propulsion system ===
During trials of the first submarines, the propulsion system was found to be prone to failure for a variety of reasons. Most failures were attributed to the fifteen-tank diesel fuel system: the tanks were designed to fill with salt water as they were emptied to maintain neutral buoyancy, but water would regularly enter the engines due to a combination of poor design, gravity separation of the fuel and water being insufficient, and operator error resulting from poor training. Problems were also caused by bacterial contamination of the diesel fuel, which, along with the salt water, would cause the fuel pumps to rust and other components to seize. The fuel-related issues were solved by installing coalescers, improving training and operational procedures, and adding biocides to the fuel.

Propeller shaft seals were a significant problem on Collins and Farncomb. Although designed to allow for a leak of 10 litres (2.2 imp gal; 2.6 US gal) per hour, during trials it was found that the seals would regularly misalign and allow hundreds of litres per hour into the boat—during one deep diving test the flow rate was measured at approximately 1,000 litres (220 imp gal; 260 US gal) a minute. ASC claimed that solving these problems could be done by manually adjusting the seals as the submarine dived and rose, but this would have required a sailor dedicated solely to that task, affecting efforts to minimise the required number of personnel. It was found that the problem could be temporarily alleviated by running the propeller in reverse for 100 revolutions, pulling the seal back into alignment, although initially a permanent solution could not be found, as ASC refused to accept responsibility for the problem, and the original manufacturer of the seals had closed down. New suppliers were found, with modified seals fitted to the first two submarines in late 1996, before completely re-designed seals were fitted to the boats in late 1997, solving the problem.

The propellers themselves were also found to be poorly manufactured, having been shaped by hand, with at least one of them cast at the wrong pitch. This was rectified by using a five-axis milling machine for future shaping work and replacing the miscast propeller. The material used for the propellers was also found to be weaker than expected, developing fatigue cracks after only a few years of use. Instead of going to Kockums, which had started to go into decline after the end of the Cold War, the submarine project office sent the propeller to the United States Navy for redesigning. Despite the Americans fixing the problems with the propeller design, resulting in significant performance improvements, the Swedish company was dissatisfied with the Australian actions; the dispatch of the propellers was one of the points of contention in the company's legal action in the mid-2000s against the Australian government over ownership of the intellectual property rights to the submarine's design.

Other propulsion problems included excessive motor vibrations at certain speeds which damaged various components (which was attributed to the removal of a flywheel and to corrosion caused by the fuel problems), and excessive fuel consumption in Collins at high speed (found to be caused by manufacturing problems with the turbines and turbochargers). The propulsion system was also found to be a secondary source of noise: poor design of the exhaust mufflers, weight-saving measures in the generator mountings, and an incorrect voltage supply to the battery compartment exhaust fans were noise-creating factors found and eliminated during studies by the DSTO.

In March 2010, the Department of Defence revealed that the generators in five of the submarines were flawed and had to be replaced. The three generators aboard each of the five submarines were to be replaced in the submarines as they came in for their next maintenance docking.

=== Periscopes and masts ===
The periscopes had two problems, the first of which was shared with the other masts. They were not streamlined; raising a periscope while moving would create enough drag and turbulence to shake the entire submarine. As with many elements of the submarine, there were disagreements as to who was responsible for the problem. It was solved by modifying the masts to redirect the water flow around them (for example, a spiral wrap was fixed around the head of each periscope).

The periscopes also had problems with their optics: periscope users reported difficulty in refocusing after changing magnification, duplication of images, and bands across the field of vision. These problems were attributed to RAN demands that the optical view be the first exposed when a periscope was raised above the water, instead of placing the infrared sensor and single-pulse radar at the head as on other submarines, requiring the optical path to be routed around these components. The periscopes were gradually improved, and were no longer a problem by the time the fast track submarines entered service.

=== Combat system ===
Despite the public focus on the various physical issues with the boats, the major problem with the submarines was the development of the Rockwell combat system. The problems had started during the funded study, when Singer Librascope and Thomson-CSF, who were partnering with Rockwell to develop the combat system, refused to release their intellectual property or their software code for Rockwell to sell. It was proposed that Computer Sciences of Australia, a division of Computer Sciences Corporation and a minor partner in the consortium, take over the role of writing the software for the combat system, although this meant that Singer Librascope, which had prior experience in creating submarine combat systems, was reduced to a minor role in the project. Other major problems with the system, to which most of the later difficulties were attributed, were that the original concept was beyond the technology of the day, and that the system architecture required by the RAN was both overly ambitious and flawed. This was compounded by the rate of advancement in computer technology: equipment had to be designed from scratch and custom manufactured at the start of the project, but by the time these were installed, they were obsolete compared to commercially available hardware and software.

Australian Submarine Corporation was made responsible for the delivery of the Rockwell combat system, but had little ability to enforce this. Rockwell was contracted to deliver the combat system by 9 September 1993, but was unlikely to do so. ASC's management board voted to issue a default notice to Rockwell as the American company had defaulted on the contract, but was ordered by the Department of Defence to retract the default notice and accept gradual delivery of partially completed versions of the combat system—referred to as 'releases' and 'drops'—until the complete system had been delivered. Sea trials of Collins were unable to commence until Release 1.5 of the combat system software was delivered; because of ongoing delays in the provision of the software, the early phases of the trials were completed using stand-alone equipment By March 1994, the combat system had become the major area of concern for the submarine project: assembly of the system was almost nine months behind schedule, and at least 20% of the software had not been compiled. The combat system continued to be a problem during the next few years, with progressive drops offering little improvements in performance over the previous version, and the completion date of Release 2—the designation for the full contractual realisation of the combat system software—was continually postponed.

In 1996, Rockwell sold its military and aerospace division, including responsibility for the Collins combat system, to Boeing. Boeing attempted to produce a workable combat system, but believed that this could only be done if the changes in technology were accounted for in a contract alteration, which the RAN and the Australian Government initially refused to do. Boeing then requested assistance from Raytheon, and after further negotiations with the Government resulted in a reduction of the system capabilities, the companies were able to stabilise the system and deliver Release 2.0 at the end of 1999. Boeing sold its naval systems division to Raytheon in May 2000, making the latter company solely responsible for completion of the combat system. After this, the submarine project began investigating ideas for a new combat system. Because there was not enough time to evaluate the replacement system to include it in the "fast track" program, Dechaineux and Sheean were fitted with the old Rockwell combat system, which was enhanced by the addition of sub-systems developed during the early 1980s for the Oberon-class mid-life upgrade and commercial off-the-shelf components. Even with the enhanced system, it was believed that the capabilities of the fast track Collins boats was at best equivalent to the Oberons.

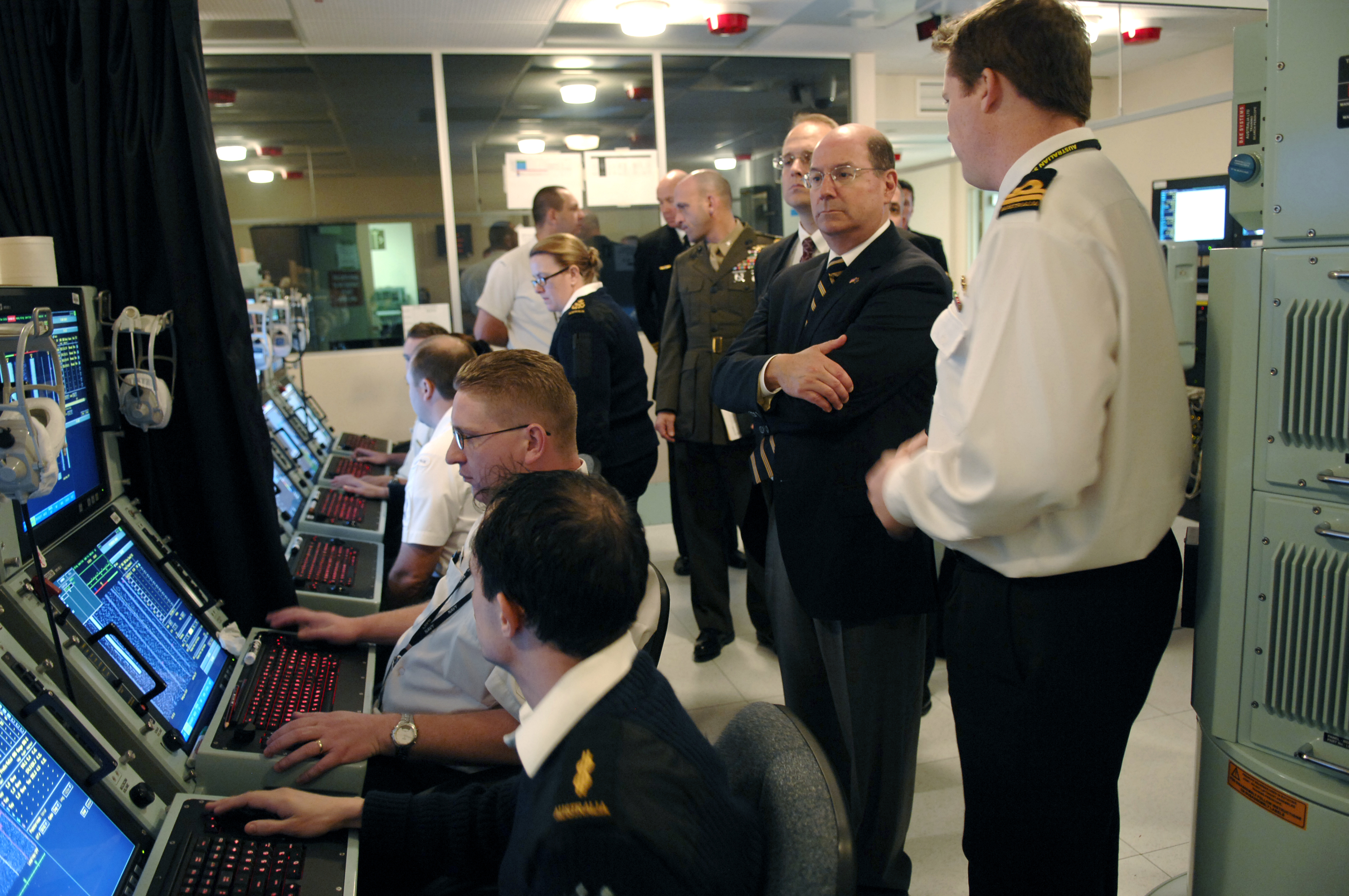
U.S. Secretary of the Navy Donald C. Winter observing the Collins Weapon System Trainer Facility at HMAS Stirling in August 2007

Lockheed Martin, Thales, STN Atlas, and Raytheon were approached to provide tenders to design and assemble a new combat system for the submarines, with all four submitting proposals during early 2000. In May 2000, after the DSTO tested operational versions of the proposed combat software packages, the Lockheed and Thales tenders were eliminated, despite the Thales proposal being rated better than Raytheon's. After indepth testing of the remaining systems and observations of the systems in action, the German STN Atlas ISUS 90-55 aboard an Israeli Dolphin-class submarine and the American Raytheon CCS Mk2 aboard a USN Los Angeles-class submarine, it was decided that the STN Atlas system was the best for the class. However, political pressure from both the United States and Australia, questions about the security problems and possible leaks involved with a European combat system linked to American weapons, and desires to increase the political and military ties between Australia and the United States resulted in the cancellation of the tender program in July 2001 and the decision to enter a joint development program with the United States, with a formal agreement signed on 10 September 2001 at the Pentagon. The replacement program received Australian government approval in September 2002.

The second combat system development program proceeded with far fewer problems, and took the tactical and fire control components from the CCS Mk2 system, and the sonar interface component from the fast track program. The system is the AN/BYG-1 that was developed for the new USN Virginia-class submarine and has since been retrofitted to the whole USN fleet. The first of class installation was Waller in 2008 and the final installation was Collins in 2018. The program was to be completed by 2010 in conjunction with modifications for the new Mk48 Mod 7 torpedo but was hampered by changes to the maintenance cycle. The system can receive new software releases and hardware can be upgraded with new versions of the system regularly released with the version operated by a boat dependent on its full cycle docking schedule.

=== Budget ===
Several newspaper articles and commentators have incorrectly claimed that the project ran significantly over the contract cost. As of the launch of the first submarine, the project cost had increased from A$3.892 billion in 1986 dollars to A$4.989 billion in 1993 dollars, which corresponded to the rate of inflation during that period. By 2006, A$5.071 billion had been spent to build the submarines (excluding the fast track program); after taking inflation into account, the project had run less than A$40 million over contract.

Of the A$1.17 billion allocated to the fast track program, only A$143 million was required to fix problems where the submarines did not correspond with the original contract: the rest was used to update components that were technologically obsolete and make changes to the submarines beyond the contract specifications. When the fast track program is factored in, the Collins class cost just under 20% more than the inflation-adjusted contract value; a smaller increase than other contemporary defence projects.

== Characteristics ==
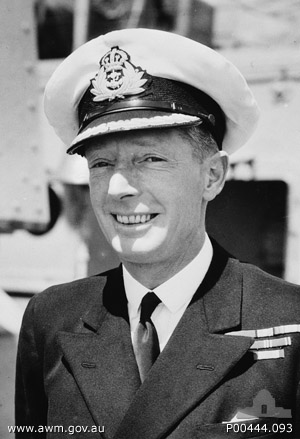
Captain (later Vice Admiral Sir) John Augustine Collins, namesake of the Collins class

The Collins class is an enlarged version of the Kockums Västergötland-class submarine. The design was referred to as the Type 471 Submarine until it was decided to name the lead boat, HMAS Collins, after RAN Vice Admiral Sir John Augustine Collins. The names of the six submarines were first announced during Collins' laying down ceremony: Collins, Farncomb, Waller, Dechaineux, Sheean, and Rankin; all named after Australian naval personnel who distinguished themselves during World War II. The Collins-class submarines are classified by the RAN as SSGs, or guided missile carrying submarines, although some defence industry websites refer to the boats as hunter-killer submarines, or SSKs.

At 77.8 metres (255 ft 3 in) in length, with a beam of 7.8 metres (25 ft 7 in) and a waterline depth of 7 metres (23 ft 0 in), the six boats were the largest conventionally powered submarines in the world at the time of their commissioning. The submarines are single-hulled, and have two continuous decks. Each boat displaces 3,100 tonnes (3,100 long tons) when surfaced, and 3,407 tonnes (3,353 long tons) when submerged. The depth that the submarines can dive to is classified. Following the near-loss of Dechaineux in 2003 when a seawater hose burst during a deep dive, the diving depth was reduced.

The hull is constructed from a high-tensile micro-alloy steel, developed by Swedish steel manufacturer SSAB, and improved by BHP of Australia, which was lighter and easier to weld than the HY-80 or HY-100 nickel-alloy steel used in contemporary submarine construction projects, while providing better results in explosion bulge testing. The submarines are covered in a skin of anechoic tiles to minimise detection by sonar: Collins was retrofitted with the tiles after the standard sonar signature of the submarine had been established, while the other five boats were covered during construction. These tiles were developed by the Australian Defence Science and Technology Organisation (DSTO) as the United States and United Kingdom would not share their information on the tiles used on their nuclear submarines, Australian researchers had to develop the tiles from scratch. The tiles were moulded in the shape of the hull, and are secured by a commercial adhesive normally used to fix cat's eyes to road surfaces: although British and American submarines are often seen with missing tiles, as of March 2007, none have been lost from a Collins-class boat.

=== Armament ===
The Collins-class submarines are armed with six 21-inch (530 mm) torpedo tubes, and carry a standard payload of 22 torpedoes. Originally, the payload was a mixture of Gould Mark 48 Mod 4 torpedoes and UGM-84C Sub-Harpoon anti-ship missiles; previously carried by the Oberon-class boats. In 2003, the RAN and the United States Navy signed a memorandum of understanding to cooperatively develop the Mark 48 Mod 7 Common Broadband Advanced Sonar System (CBASS) torpedo. The first of class boat to be modified for the new torpedo was Waller in 2008 and Collins was the last boat to be modified in 2018. The modifications were to be completed by 2010. Waller was the first vessel of either navy to fire an armed Mod 7, sinking the decommissioned Spruance-class destroyer USS Fletcher on 16 July 2008, during RIMPAC 08.

In lieu of a torpedo payload 44 mines can be carried. The RAN does not identify the mine for security reasons. In 2000, the Stonefish Mk III mine was selected under Project 2045 Phase 1A for the RAN, however, the project was cancelled. In a project cancelled in 2001, the RAN and the United States Navy were cooperatively developing the Improved Submarine Launched Mobile Mine (ISLMM) Mk 76. The mine was based on the Mark 48 torpedo and was to replace the United States Navy SLMM Mk 67 mine. Under Project SEA 2000, the RAN will acquire RWM Italia smart sea mines with deliveries expected in 2023. The type of RWM Italia sea mine the Collins-class will use is classified.

During the construction phase, consideration was given to acquiring submarine-launchable Tomahawk cruise missiles; giving the boats the capability to attack land targets after minor modifications. Plans to acquire Tomahawk or similar land-attack missiles remained under consideration until 2009, when the Defending Australia in the Asia Pacific Century: Force 2030 white paper was released; stating that land-attack missiles will instead be incorporated into the armament of the Collins-class replacement. In 2022, the RAN said that it was conducting a feasibility study on arming the Collins-class with Tomahawk cruise missiles. In June 2024, the Minister for Defence Industry said that it was not viable and did not represent value for money to add a Tomahawk cruise capability to the Collins-class.

=== Propulsion ===
Each submarine is equipped with three Garden Island-Hedemora HV V18b/15Ub (VB210) 18-cylinder diesel engines, which are each connected to a 1,400 kW, 440-volt DC Jeumont-Schneider generator. The combined electrical generation capability of each submarine is 4.2 Megawatts. The Hedemora diesels were chosen because of modular construction, which made servicing easier; they could be installed three across in the available space, while other contenders required at least two banks of two; and they had turbochargers driven by the exhaust gas. Fifteen fuel tanks are located throughout the submarine: they must be used in specific sequences to preserve the submarine's buoyancy and trim.

Electricity is stored in four lead-acid battery packs, totalling 400 tonnes, assembled by Pacific Marine Batteries, a joint venture between VARTA of Germany and Pacific Dunlop of Australia. These supply a single Jeumont Schneider DC motor, which provides 7,200 shaft horsepower to a seven-bladed, 4.22-metre (13.8 ft) diameter skewback propeller. The propeller design is classified Top Secret, and must be covered before a Collins-class submarine can be removed from the water for maintenance. Emergency propulsion is provided by a MacTaggart Scott DM 43006 retractable hydraulic motor. The aft control surfaces are mounted on an X-shaped structure, giving the boats the ability to outmanoeuvre most warship and submarine classes.

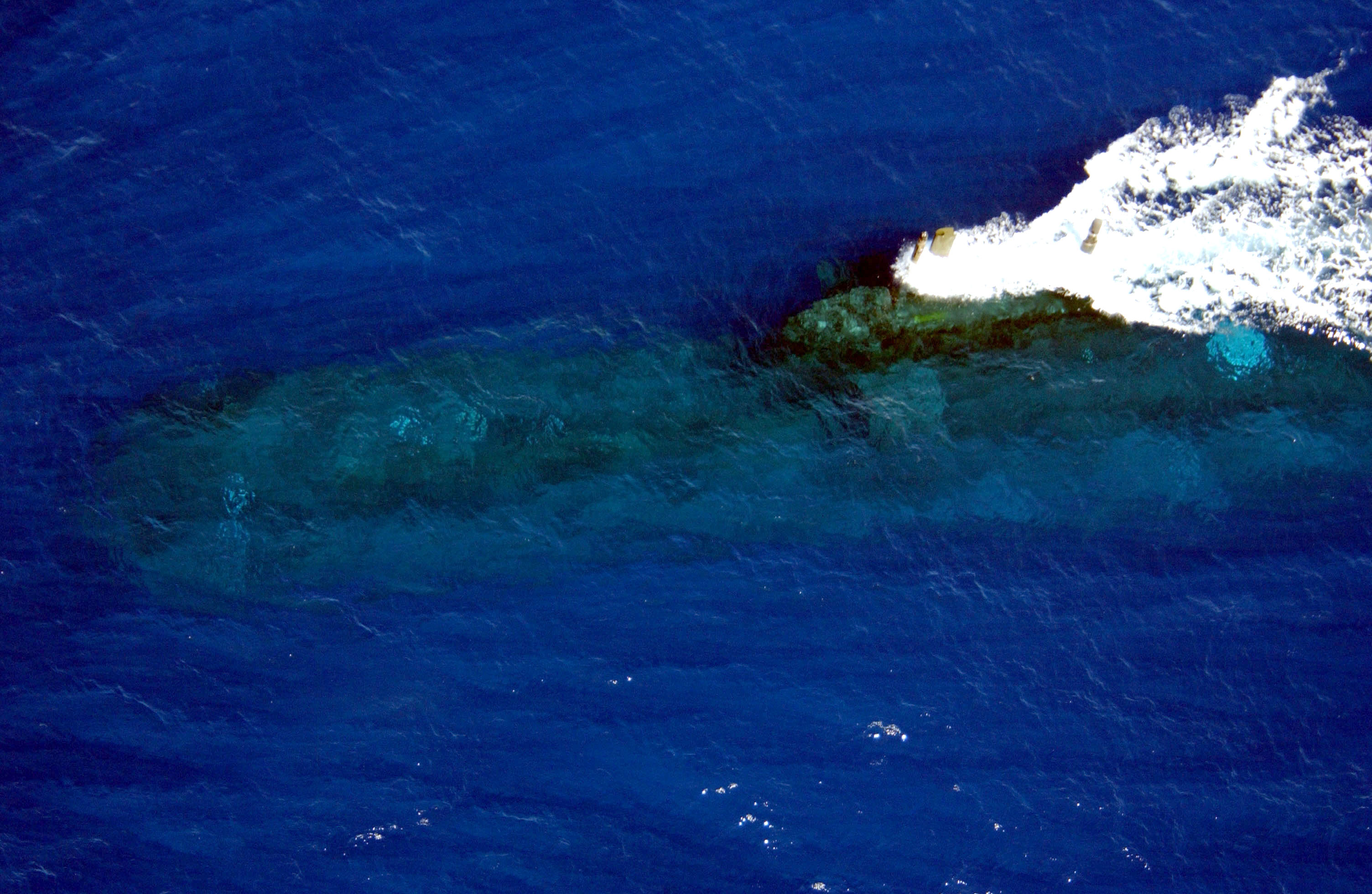
Rankin underway at snorkel or periscope depth during RIMPAC 04

The Collins class has a speed of 10 knots (19 km/h; 12 mph) when surfaced and at snorkel depth, and can reach 20 knots (37 km/h; 23 mph) underwater. When travelling at 10 knots (19 km/h; 12 mph), the submarines have a range of 11,500 nautical miles (21,300 km; 13,200 mi) along the surface, or 9,000 nautical miles (17,000 km; 10,000 mi) at snorkel depth. When fully submerged, a Collins-class submarine can travel 480 nautical miles (890 km; 550 mi) at 4 knots (7.4 km/h; 4.6 mph).

Nuclear propulsion was ruled out at an early stage of the project, because supporting nuclear submarines without a nuclear power industry in Australia and public opposition to such infrastructure would be extremely difficult. Air-independent propulsion (AIP) was also considered for the class, and the submarines were designed to be retrofitted with an AIP system. The AIP plan was cancelled in July 1996, after it was demonstrated during sea trials that during constant operations, the boat's snorkel was exposed for only a few minutes in a 24-hour period; officials from ASC claimed that any Collins-class submarine spotted while snorting would be because the boat was "dead unlucky". Installation of AIP was not believed to provide enough of an improvement on this to justify the predicted A$100 million cost.

=== Sensors and systems ===
The main sonar array is a Thomson Sintra Scylla active/passive bow sonar, linked to a passive intercept and ranging array distributed along the flanks of the submarine; three panels on each side. Collins and Farncomb were originally fitted with Thales Karriwarra passive towed sonar arrays, while the other four boats could be fitted with the Karriwarra or Thales' Namara array. These were later replaced across the class with the Thales SHOR-TAS towed passive array, deployed through the horizontal 'pipe' at the stern. When surfaced or at periscope depth, the Collins-class boats can use a Kelvin Hughes Type 1007 surface search radar, which is situated in a retractable mast on the fin.

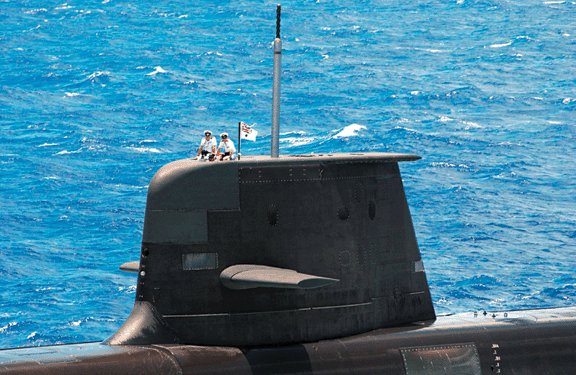
The fin of Sheean. The CH093 attack periscope mast is extended, and one of the panels for the distributed sonar array can be seen at the bottom right of the image.

Each submarine is fitted with a CK043 search periscope and CH093 attack periscope. The periscopes were manufactured by Pilkington Optronics (now Thales Optronics), and experienced several problems early in the submarines' service lives. In 2022, Safran was selected to replace the CK043 with their Series 30 search optronic mast. Rankin is scheduled to be fitted with the optronic mast in 2024.

The hardware for the original combat system was based around the Motorola 68000 family of processors. The replacement combat system consists of the tactical and fire control components from the Raytheon CCS Mk2 system, combined with the sonar interfaces developed for the improved combat system used aboard Sheean and Dechaineux. Countermeasures include a Condor CS-5600 ESM intercept and warning unit, and two SSE decoys. The boats are fitted with a Marconi SDG-1802 degaussing system, and a receive-only Link 11 combat information exchange datalink. In October 2006, Sagem Défense Sécurité was selected to fit the Collins class with SIGMA 40XP gyrolaser inertial navigation systems.

=== Special forces support ===
The Collins class was not designed to support special forces operations providing a limited capability similar to the Oberon class. In 2005, Collins received a special forces upgrade to provide three capabilities of multi swimmer release, float on/float off and exit and reentry. However, there were issues with exit and reentry during sea trials. Originally only one submarine was planned to receive the upgrade. In 2014, Dechaineux was upgraded and the issue with exit and reentry was rectified. Collins is scheduled on its next maintenance docking to receive the safety upgrade for exit and reentry. However, the full special forces upgrade is yet to be reached with outboard stowage of equipment, such as for inflatable boats, still in the design phase.

=== Ship's company ===
Originally, the standard complement of each submarine was six officers and thirty-six sailors, with facilities to carry an additional twelve personnel (usually trainees). This number was minimised by the RAN during design, which insisted that functions be automated where possible; the RAN also requiring that each sailor have his own rack and did not need to 'hot bunk'. It was originally intended that multiple ship's companies be established per submarine, and that these be rotated to maximise the submarines' time at sea without adversely affecting personnel, but difficulties in maintaining submariner numbers made this plan unworkable. Enlisted submariners are accommodated in six-bunk cabins.

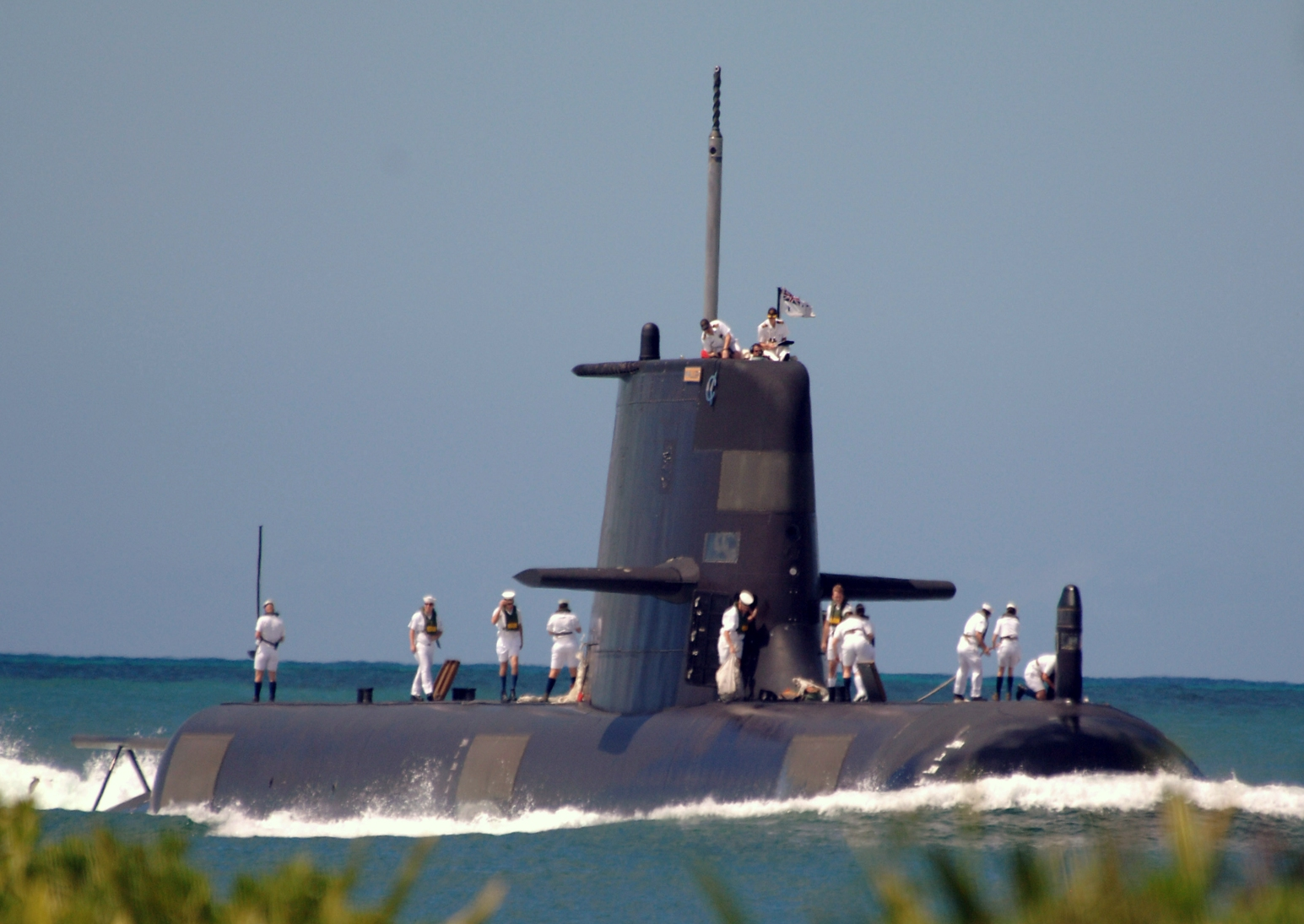
Members of HMAS Waller's complement working on the boat as she enters Pearl Harbor in 2008

In May 1997, two groups of six female sailors were posted to Collins and Farncomb to test the feasibility of mixed-sex submarine companies. Following the trial's success, eleven female sailors and one female officer commenced submarine training in 1998. Officers and senior enlisted submariners slept in mixed accommodation, but junior enlisted submariners could be deployed in groups of only six: one of the enlisted cabins was set aside, and all six bunks in the cabin had to be filled. Mixed accommodation for all female submariners was approved in June 2011, in order to increase posting opportunities and help make up shortfalls in submarine complements.

During the late 1990s, a combination of low recruitment and retention rates across the RAN resulted in the number of trained submariners falling below 40% of that required. As an attempt to retain submariners, the RAN offered a one-off A$35,000 bonus in 1999. Other measures introduced around the same time included priority transfer of volunteers for submarine training and rotating submariners between sea and shore assignments to relieve them from continual sea service and prevent burnout. A year later, these measures had increased submariner numbers to 55% of requirements.

However, the problem with submarine crewing continued; by 2008 the RAN could provide complete companies for only three of the six submarines. A review by Rear Admiral Rowan Moffitt during 2008 (the Submarine Workforce Sustainability Review or Moffitt Report) found that poor leadership and a culture of "mission achievement at almost any cost" resulted in submariners who were regularly stressed and fatigued from working for up to 22 hours in a stretch, under conditions worse than those experienced by the Special Air Service during the Afghanistan conflict. Submariners were also found to have lower morale and job satisfaction levels than any other position in the RAN, with these factors combining to cause a high rate of personnel burnout, while resignations meant that the average experience level in those remaining decreased. The report, publicly released in April 2009, made 29 recommendations to improve conditions and stabilise or increase submariner numbers; all of which the RAN agreed to adopt. These measures included increasing each boat's complement to 58 to spread workload (a practice successfully employed aboard Farncomb since December 2008), reducing the length of patrols and increasing shore leave, paying bonuses for submariners who remain in the submarine service for at least eighteen months, and providing internet access aboard the submarines. A dedicated recruiting program was also suggested, promoting the submarine service as an elite unit, and targeting RAN personnel aboard surface ships, former submariners whose civilian jobs may have been affected by the 2008 financial crisis, and submariners in foreign navies. The program was successful; by June 2010, three expanded ship's companies were active, while a fourth was undergoing training. By December 2012, the fourth company was active, and was preparing to bring a submarine out of deep maintenance in 2013.

=== Sustainment, maintenance and upgrade ===
The Collins-class submarines are maintained at the ASC North facility at Osbourne in South Australia and at the ASC West facility at Henderson in Western Australia. The maintenance cycle for the submarines known as a Usage Upkeep Cycle was initially six years in operational service then a nineteen month major overhaul and refit at Osbourne known as a full cycle docking (FCD), and in between, at Henderson a four month mid cycle docking (MCD) and two two and half month intermediate dockings (ID). The cycle was later changed to eight years in operational service with a three year FCD, six month MCD and one three month ID. In 2013, the government adopted the 2012 Coles Report recommendation to change the cycle to ten years in operational service with a two year FCD, a twelve month MCD and one six month ID. During these dockings, the submarines are fitted with any enhancements or new technologies as part of the Collins Continuous Improvement Program (part of Defence procurement project SEA 1439).

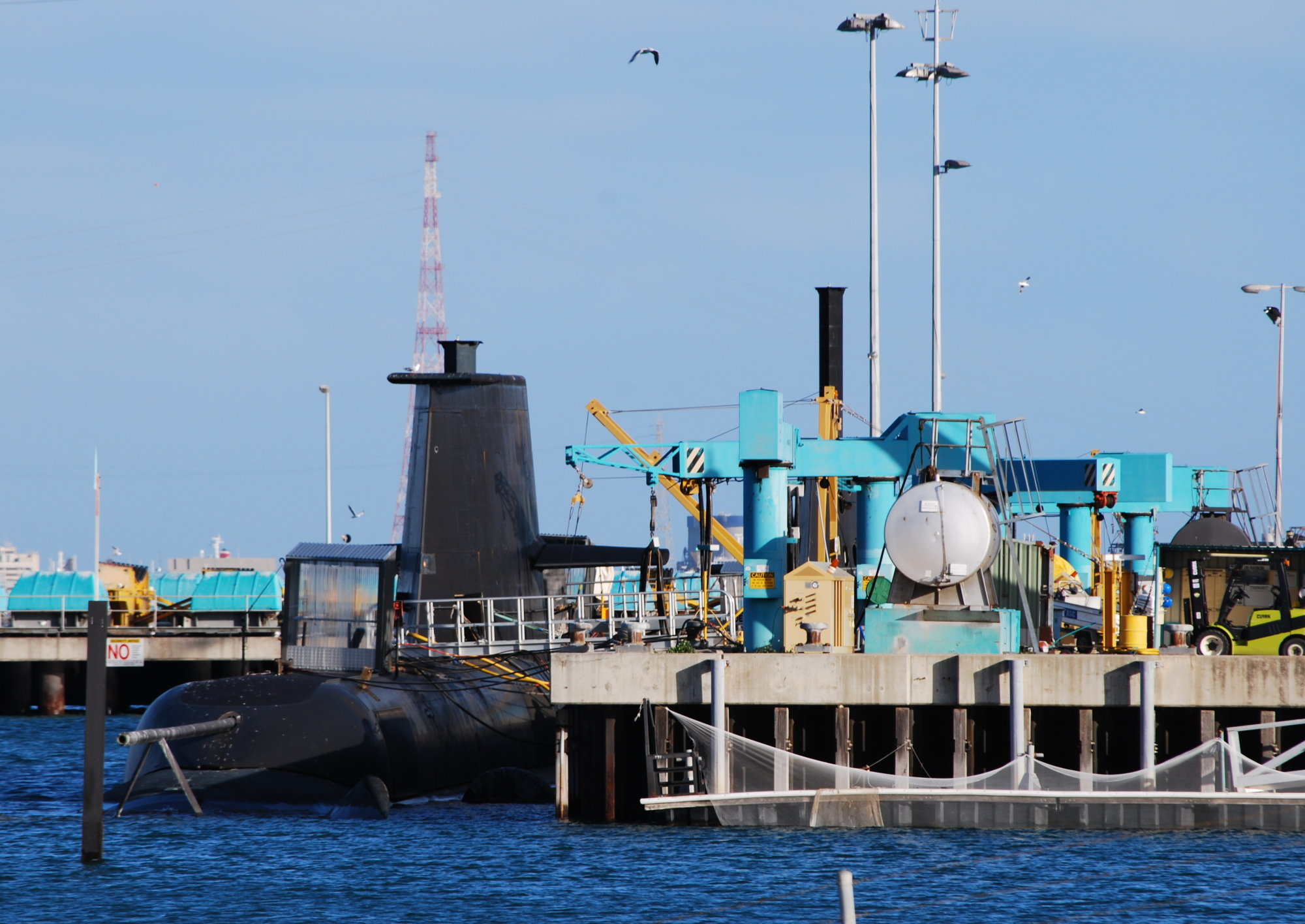
A Collins-class submarine alongside at ASC in 2008

The sustainment, maintenance and upgrade of the Collins-class fleet underwent a Federal Government-commissioned root-and-branch review from 2011 by Dr John Coles, and major reforms were instituted in the following years, including an innovation program across deep maintenance operations at ASC in Osborne. ASC later was recognised by Engineers Australia with an award for the innovation and effectiveness of its improvements to Collins sustainment.

The result of the system-wide reform by the Submarine Enterprise has been a "dramatic turnaround" in submarine availability for the RAN and the Collins-class program performing as an "exemplar".

The latest review by Dr Coles found that ASC and the Submarine Enterprise were achieving submarine sustainment and availability at or exceeding international benchmarks.

== Operations and deployments ==
The entire class is based at HMAS Stirling, also known as Fleet Base West, which is located on Garden Island, off the coast of Western Australia. The decision to locate all six submarines at Stirling was prompted by the lack of suitable long-term facilities on the east coast of Australia (although individual submarines can use Fleet Base East in Sydney Harbour as a forward staging facility), and the proximity to Australian offshore interests, including most of the nation's external territories, the oil and natural gas resources of the North West Shelf, and the Indian Ocean sea lines of communication, through which the majority of Australia's seaborne trade passes. The submarines' primary missions are patrolling the waters of Australia and nearby nations, and gathering intelligence through the interception of electronic communications by foreign nations and the deployment/retrieval of special forces operatives.

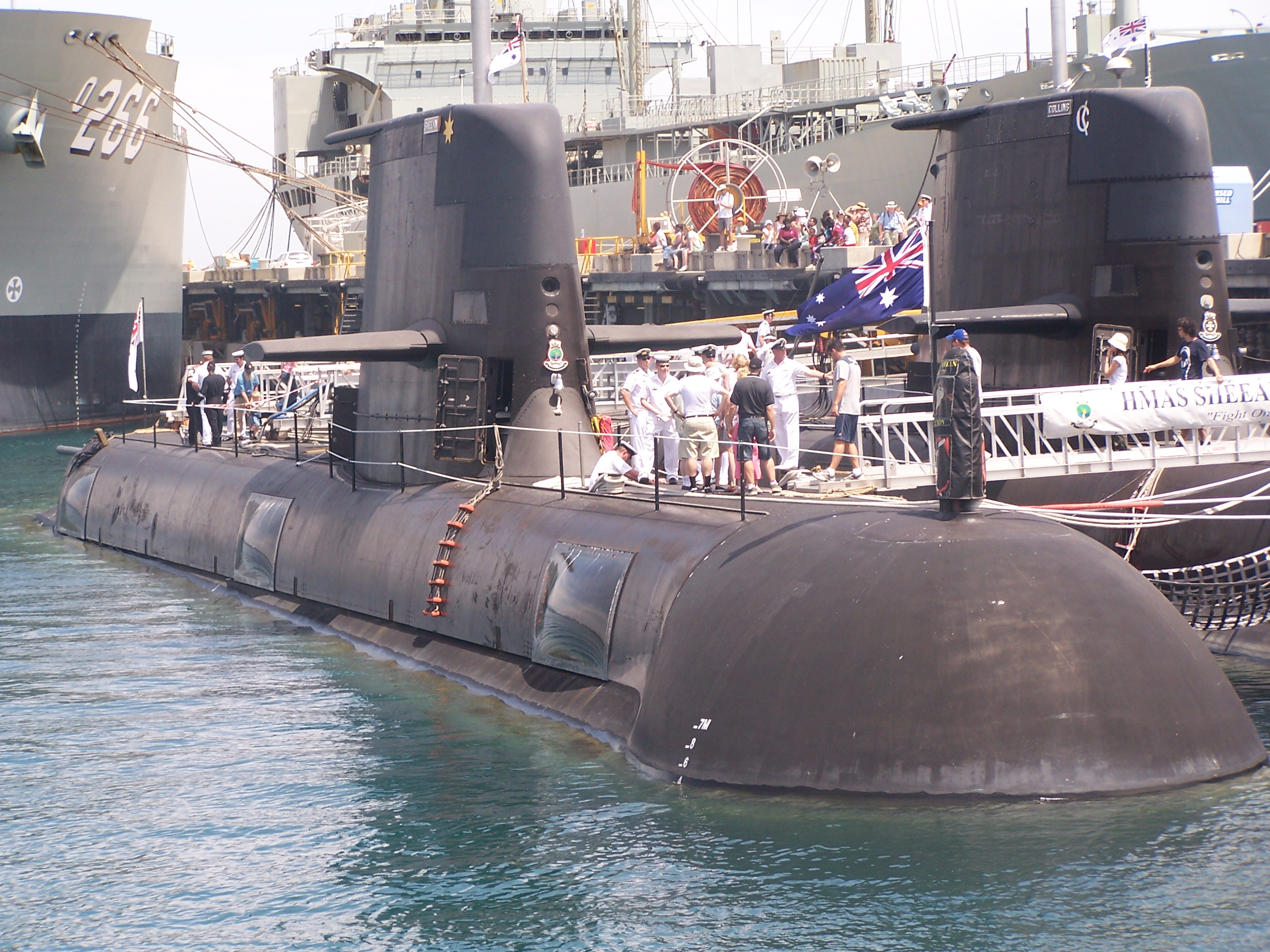
HMAS Sheean (left) and Collins (right) at the 2006 HMAS Stirling open day

=== Operational history ===
Two boats, including Waller, reportedly operated in support of the International Force for East Timor (INTERFET) in 1999 providing an escort for transport ships and monitored Indonesian communications.

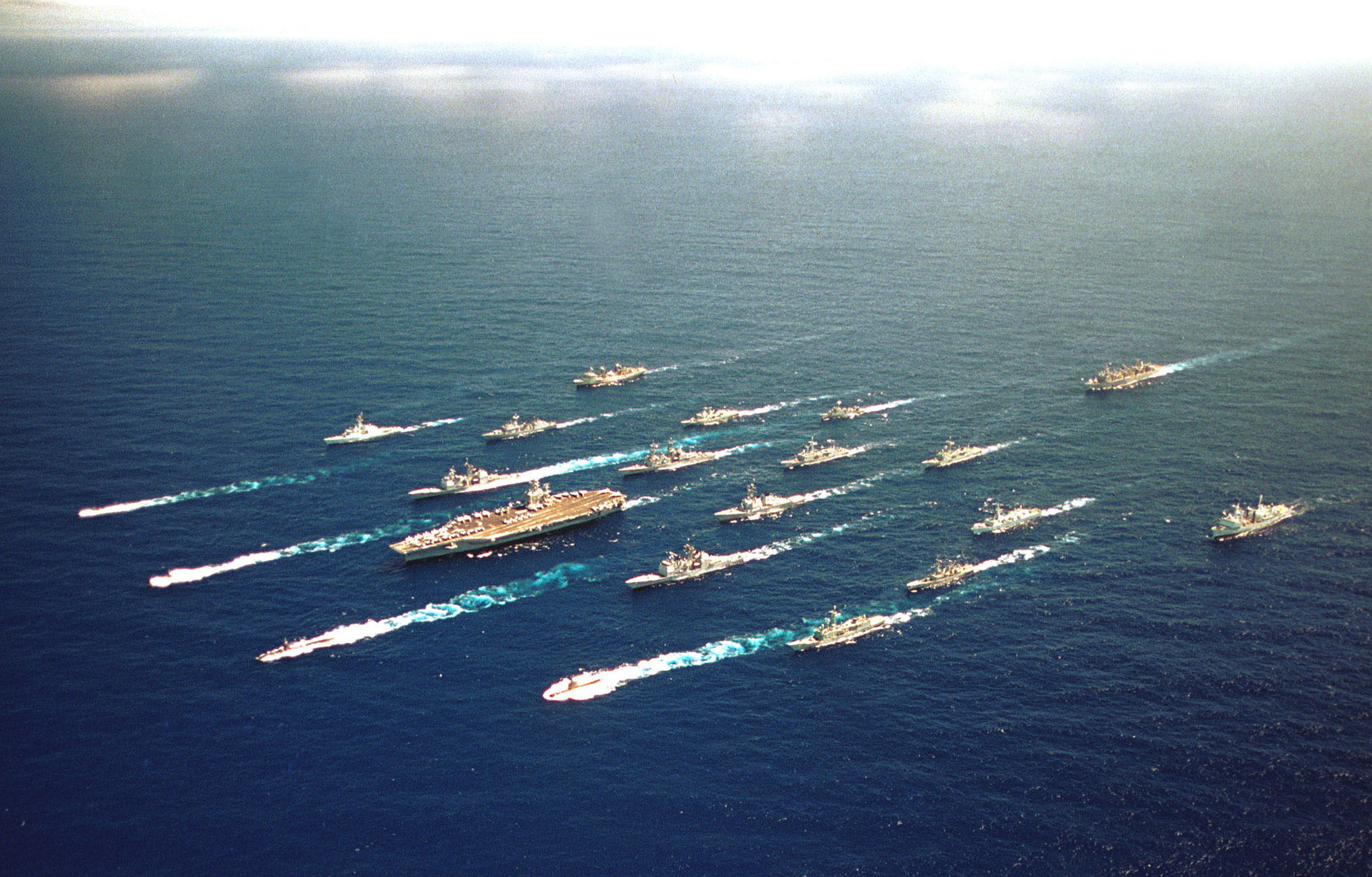
The Abraham Lincoln battle group during RIMPAC 2000. Waller operated with this force during late May 2000, becoming the first Australian submarine to be integrated into a carrier battle group.

During several multinational exercises and wargames, the Collins class has demonstrated its effectiveness in the hunter-killer role by successfully attacking both surface warships and other submarines. In late May 2000, Waller became the first Australian submarine to operate as a fully integrated component of a USN carrier battle group during wargames. Waller's role was to search for and engage opposing submarines hunting the aircraft carrier USS Abraham Lincoln, a role in which she performed better than expected. A few days later, as part of the multinational exercise RIMPAC 2000, Waller was assigned to act as an 'enemy' submarine, and was reported to have successfully engaged two USN nuclear submarines before almost coming into attacking range of Abraham Lincoln. Waller performed similarly during the Operation Tandem Thrust wargames in 2001, when she 'sank' two USN amphibious assault ships in waters just over 70 metres (230 ft) deep, although the submarine was 'destroyed' herself later in the exercise. Waller's second feat was repeated by Sheean during RIMPAC 02, when the boat was able to penetrate the air and surface anti-submarine screens of an eight-ship amphibious task force, then successfully carry out simulated attacks on both the amphibious assault ship USS Tarawa and the dock landing ship USS Rushmore.

Later that year, during two weeks of combat trials in August, Sheean demonstrated that the class was comparable in the underwater warfare role to the Los Angeles-class nuclear-powered attack submarine USS Olympia. The two submarines traded roles during the exercise and were equally successful in the attacking role, despite Olympia being larger, more powerful, and armed with more advanced torpedoes. In 2003, a Collins-class boat carried out successful attacks on two USN nuclear submarines and an aircraft carrier during a multinational exercise. The repeated successes of the class in wargames and multinational exercises earned the Collins class praise from foreign military officers for being "a very capable and quiet submarine", and recognition of the boats as a clear example of the threat posed to navies by modern diesel submarines.

On 12 February 2003, Dechaineux was operating near her maximum safe diving depth off the coast of Western Australia when a seawater hose burst. The high-pressure seawater flooded the lower engine room before the hose was sealed off: it was estimated that if the inflow had continued for another twenty seconds, the weight of the water would have prevented Dechaineux from returning to the surface. The RAN recalled the Collins-class submarines to base after the incident; after engineers were unable to determine any flaws in the pipes that could have caused the incident, the maximum safe diving depth of the class was reduced.

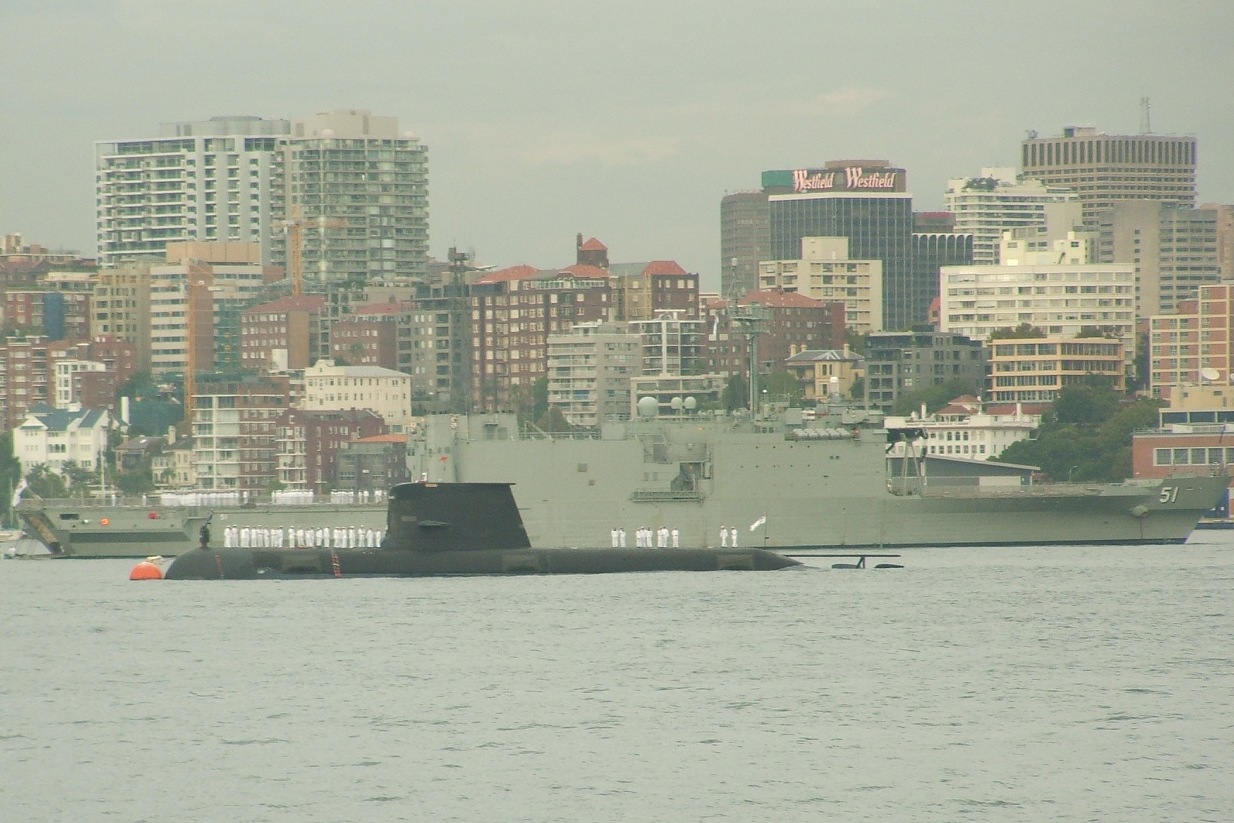
Farncomb and the amphibious transport ship HMAS Kanimbla anchored in Sydney Harbour following a ceremonial fleet entry in March 2009

On 10 June 2005, Rankin became the first submarine since Orion in 1987 to receive the Gloucester Cup, an award presented to the RAN vessel with the greatest overall efficiency during the previous year. The award was subsequently presented to Sheean in 2006, and again to Rankin in 2008.

In March 2007, Farncomb had an emergency when crew were washed overboard while attempting to remove fishing line from the propeller. The boat was reportedly conducting surveillance on Chinese Navy submarines in the South China Sea.

In 2008 and 2009, personnel shortages reduced the number of submarines able to be deployed to three; the maintenance cycles of Sheean, Rankin, and Dechaineux, and problems with Collins and Waller further reducing this to one, Farncomb, in mid-2009. Farncomb was docked for repair after a generator malfunction in February 2010, by which point Collins and Waller were active (the former on limited duties because of defects), and Dechaineux was slated to re-enter service by May 2010. Workforce shortages and malfunctions on other submarines during the preceding two years impacted heavily on the maintenance of Sheean and Rankin, with RAN and ASC officials predicting that they would not be active until 2012 and 2013, respectively. In June 2011, The Australian newspaper claimed despite two submarines (Waller and Dechaineux) designated as operational, neither was in sailable condition. The initial findings from the Coles Review revealed significant, systemic problems with the submarines and noted the need for their management to be reformed. A 2014 statement by Vice Admiral Ray Griggs indicated that up to four submarines had been operational on most occasions since 2012.

== Replacement ==
The submarines originally had a predicted operational life of around 30 years, with Collins to decommission around 2025. The Submarine Institute of Australia released a report in July 2007 arguing that planning for the next generation of Australian submarines had to begin soon. In December 2007, shortly after the 2007 federal election, the Australian government announced that planning for a Collins-class replacement (procurement project SEA 1000) had commenced. The 2009 Defending Australia in the Asia Pacific Century: Force 2030 white paper confirmed the replacement project, and announced that the submarine fleet would be increased to twelve vessels to sustain submarine operations in any conflict, and counter the growing potency of Asian-Pacific naval forces.

The 2009 white paper outlined the replacement submarine as a 4,000-ton vessel fitted with land-attack cruise missiles in addition to torpedoes and anti-ship missiles, capable of launching and recovering covert operatives while submerged, and carrying surveillance and intelligence-gathering equipment. The project initially had four options: a Military-Off-The-Shelf (MOTS) design without modification, a MOTS design modified for Australian conditions, an evolution of an existing submarine, or a newly designed submarine. Nuclear propulsion was ruled out because of the lack of nuclear infrastructure and public opposition to nuclear technology. Designs initially considered for purchase or modification included the Spanish S-80 class, the French-designed Scorpène class, the German-designed Type 214, and Japan's Sōryū class, along with an evolution of the Collins.

There were long delays in organising the replacement project. Originally, preliminary designs were to be established for selection by 2013, with detailed design work completed by 2016. However, meetings to clarify concepts and intended capabilities did not occur until March 2012, and initial design phase funding was not approved until May 2012, pushing construction start out to 2017. By November 2014, initial capabilities still had not been decided on, with recommendations to be made across 2015. The best case prediction for seeing the first new submarine enter service, made in 2012, was "after 2030", with the lack of decision making partly attributed to politicians fearing being held responsible for a repeat of the issues surrounding the Collins class.

Throughout 2014, there was increasing speculation that the Sōryū class (or a derivative) was the most likely candidate for the replacement. Defence technology sharing deals between Japan and Australia, along with the loosening of Japanese defence export restrictions, were seen as preliminary steps towards such a deal. The close personal relationship between the then-Australian Prime Minister Tony Abbott and Japanese Prime Minister Shinzō Abe was also cited as a factor in the likeliness of such a deal. In response to the rumours of the Japanese deal, unsolicited proposals were made by ThyssenKrupp Marine Systems (its Type 216 submarine concept), Saab (an enlarged version of the A26 submarine), and Thales and DCNS (a diesel-electric variant of the Barracuda-class submarine).

In January 2015, a three-way "competitive evaluation process" between the Japanese proposal, ThyssenKrupp's plan, and the Thales-DCNS offer was announced. A 2012 study of the Collins class concluded that the submarines' lifespan could be extended by one maintenance cycle (seven years) to cover any capability gap, with lead submarine Collins to be retired in the early 2030s.

=== Attack-class submarine ===
On 26 April 2016, Prime Minister Malcolm Turnbull announced the Shortfin Barracuda by French firm DCNS as the winner. Up to 12 submarines were to be procured.

=== Virginia-class and SSN-AUKUS class submarines ===
On 15 September 2021, Prime Minister Scott Morrison announced the trilateral security partnership named AUKUS between Australia, the United States and the United Kingdom under which Australia intended to procure at least eight nuclear-powered submarines armed with conventional weapons. On 13 March 2023, AUKUS announced that the fleet would be a combination of US built Virginia class submarines and a new nuclear powered submarine class to be built in the UK and Australia to be called the SSN-AUKUS. The US intends to sell three Virginia class submarines to Australia and Australia intends to build five SSN-AUKUS class submarines in Australia.

== See also ==
- List of submarine classes in service

Equivalent submarines of the same era

- Oyashio class
- Walrus class
- Project 636
- Hai Lung class
- Upholder/Victoria class
