= John Augustine Collins =

Royal Australian Navy officer (1899–1989)

Vice-Admiral Sir John Augustine Collins KBE CB
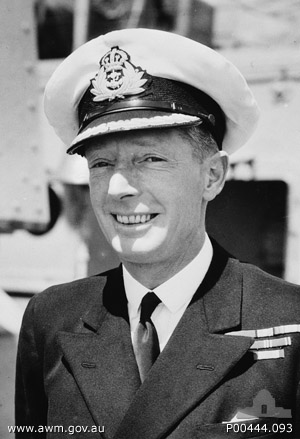
- Captain John Collins in 1943
- Born: 7 January 1899; Deloraine, Tasmania
- Died: 3 September 1989 (aged 90); Sydney, New South Wales
- Military career
- Allegiance: Australia
- Branch: Royal Australian Navy
- Service years: 1913–1955
- Rank: Vice-Admiral
- Commands: Chief of Naval Staff (1948–1955); HM Australian Squadron (1944, 1945–1946); Task Force 74 (1944–1945); HMAS Shropshire (1943–1944); China Force (1942); HMAS Sydney (1935–1937, 1939–1941)
- Conflicts: First World War; Second World War; Battle of the Mediterranean; Battle of Cape Spada; Dutch East Indies Campaign; Bougainville Campaign; Battle of Cape Gloucester; Battle of Noemfoor; Battle of Leyte Gulf
- Awards: Knight Commander of the Order of the British Empire; Companion of the Order of the Bath; Mentioned in Despatches; Commander of the Order of Orange-Nassau (Netherlands); Officer of the Legion of Merit (United States)
- Other work: High Commissioner to New Zealand (1956–1962)

Vice-Admiral Sir John Augustine Collins, KBE, CB (7 January 1899 – 3 September 1989) was a Royal Australian Navy (RAN) officer who served in both World Wars, and who eventually rose to become a vice admiral and Chief of Naval Staff. Collins was one of the first graduates of the Royal Australian Naval College to attain flag rank. During the Second World War, he commanded the cruiser HMAS Sydney in the Mediterranean campaign. He led the Australian Naval Squadron in the Pacific theatre and was wounded in the first recorded kamikaze attack, in 1944.

== Early life and education ==
John Augustine Collins was born in Deloraine, Tasmania, to an English (Anglican) mother and an Irish (Catholic) father in 1899. His father died seven months before he was born, on 31 May 1898, and the family soon after moved to St Kilda, in Victoria. In 1913, at age 14, Collins joined the first intake to the RAN College. He became a midshipman in January 1917, in time to see war service while attached to the Royal Navy. His elder brother became the well known author, Cuthbert Quinlan Dale Collins, known as Dale Collins.

== Second World War ==
In the early Second World War, Collins commanded HMAS Sydney in the Battle of the Mediterranean. Sydney led Allied ships which sank an Italian cruiser, Bartolomeo Colleoni, in the Battle of Cape Spada, in July 1940. For this action, in 1940 he was appointed a Companion of the Order of the Bath.

Relations between the RAN and British Royal Navy were close at the time, with frequent exchanges of officers between the two and in June 1941, Collins was transferred to Singapore, as Assistant Chief of Staff to the British Naval Commander in Chief, China Station, Vice Admiral Geoffrey Layton.

Following the outbreak of war with Japan, Collins was appointed Commodore Commanding China Force, the RN-RAN cruiser and destroyer force based in Batavia, Dutch East Indies, under the American-British-Dutch-Australian Command.

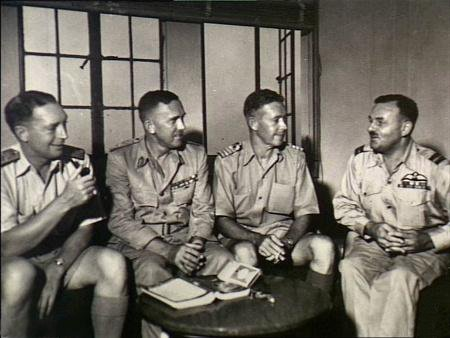
Members of the Australian Mission Group at the Japanese surrender talks. Left to right: Commodore John Collins; Lieutenant General Frank Berryman; Captain Roy Dowling; Air Commodore Raymond Brownell.

After the fall of Singapore and the Allied defeat in the Battle of the Java Sea, it became clear that the Dutch East Indies would be occupied by Japan. Collins organised the evacuation of Allied civilians and military personnel from Batavia, and was on one of the last ships to leave, before the city fell, in March 1942. As a result, he was Mentioned in Despatches, and was later made a Commander of the Dutch Order of Orange-Nassau.

Collins was then appointed Senior Naval Officer, Western Australia, based at Fremantle.

During 1943, Collins commanded HMAS Shropshire and took part in the Bougainville campaign, the Battle of Cape Gloucester, and operations off the Admiralty Islands and Hollandia (Dutch New Guinea).

In mid-1944, Collins was made commander of the Australian-US Navy Task Force 74, and commander of the Australian Naval Squadron, with HMAS Australia as his flagship. He became the first graduate of the RAN College to command a naval squadron in action, during the bombardment of Noemfoor, on 2 July 1944.

Collins was badly wounded in the first kamikaze attack in history, which hit Australia on 21 October 1944, in the lead up to the Battle of Leyte Gulf. He did not resume his command until July 1945. When the war ended Collins was the RAN's representative at the surrender ceremony in Tokyo Bay.

== Post-war service and legacy ==
Collins was appointed Chief of Naval Staff in 1948, succeeding Sir Louis Keppel Hamilton, and held the position until 1955. He was knighted as a Knight Commander of the Order of the British Empire in the 1951 New Year Honours. He later served as Australia's High Commissioner to New Zealand (1956–1962).

The latest class of Australian submarine, the Collins class bears his name. The lead submarine, HMAS Collins, was launched by his widow on 28 August 1993. Collins Road, a street in the north Sydney suburb of St Ives, and another in the town of Narooma were also named in his honour.

Military offices
Preceded by Admiral Sir Louis Hamilton	First Naval Member & Chief of Staff; 1948–1955	Succeeded by Vice Admiral Sir Roy Dowling
Preceded by Commodore Harold Farncomb	Rear Admiral Commanding HM Australian Squadron; 1945–1946	Succeeded by Rear Admiral Harold Farncomb
Preceded by Rear Admiral Victor Crutchley	Rear Admiral Commanding HM Australian Squadron; June – October 1944	Succeeded by Captain Charles Nichols
Diplomatic posts
Preceded by Peter Heydon	Australian High Commissioner to New Zealand; 1956–1962	Succeeded by Donald Alastair Cameron
