= HMAS Collins =

1993 Collins-class submarine

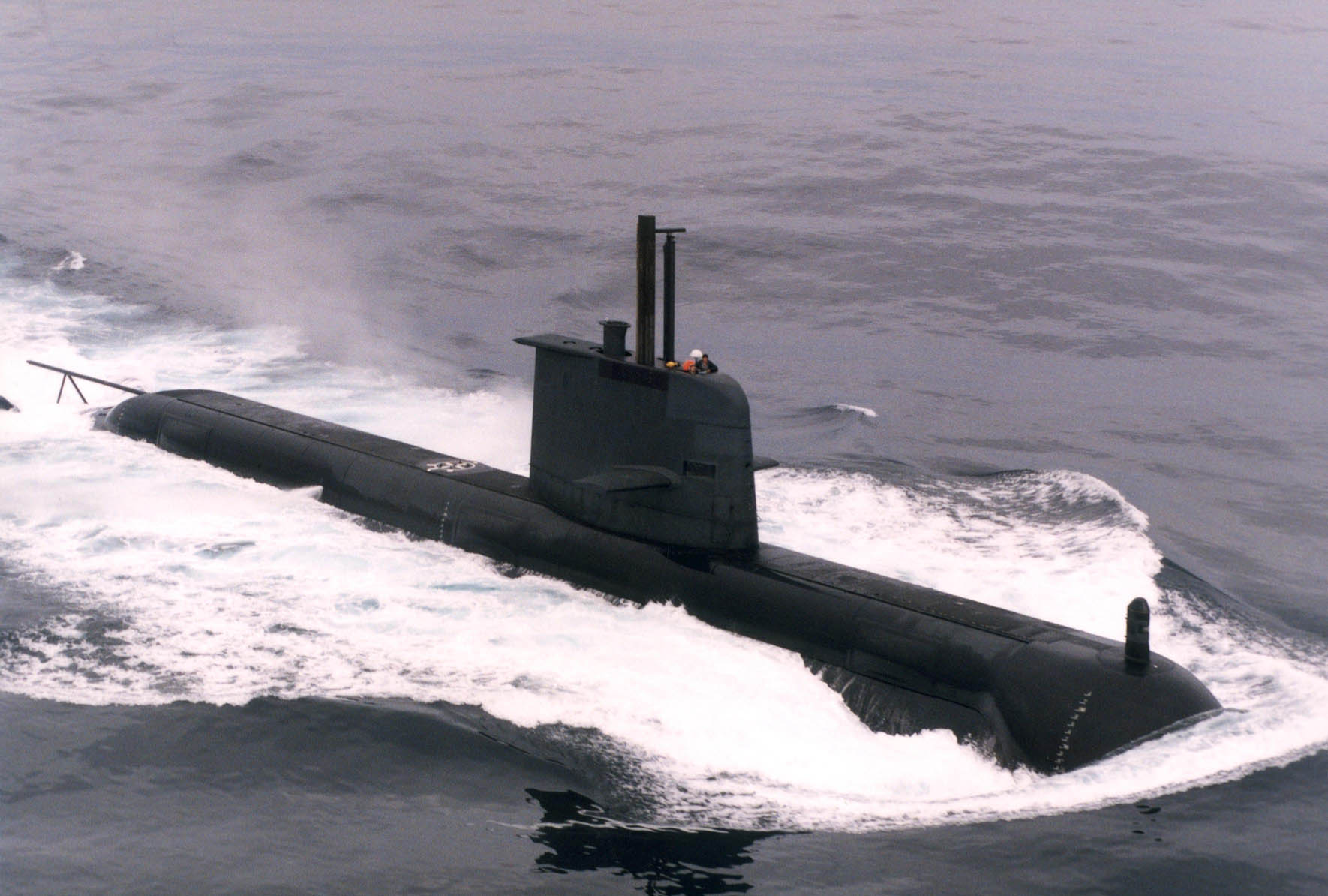
- HMAS Collins at sea

History

Australia
- Name: Collins
- Namesake: Vice Admiral Sir John Augustine Collins
- Builder: Australian Submarine Corporation, Osborne
- Laid down: February 1990
- Launched: 28 August 1993
- Completed: June 1994
- Commissioned: 27 July 1996
- Home port: Fleet Base West, Perth
- Motto: "Vanguard"
- Status: Active
- Badge

General characteristics
- Class & type: Collins-class submarine
- Displacement: 3,051 tonnes (surfaced); 3,353 tonnes (submerged)
- Length: 77.42 m (254.0 ft)
- Beam: 7.8 m (26 ft)
- Draught: 7 m (23 ft) at waterline
- Installed power: 3 × Garden Island-Hedemora HV V18b/15Ub (VB210) 18-cylinder diesel motors, 3 × Jeumont-Schneider generators (1,400 kW, 440-volt DC)
- Propulsion: Main: 1 × Jeumont-Schneider DC motor (7,200 shp), driving 1 × seven-bladed, 4.22 m (13.8 ft) diameter skewback propeller; Emergency: 1 × MacTaggart Scott DM 43006 retractable hydraulic motor
- Speed: 10.5 knots (19.4 km/h; 12.1 mph) (surfaced and snorkel depth); 21 knots (39 km/h; 24 mph) (submerged)
- Range: 11,000 nautical miles (20,000 km; 13,000 mi) at 10 knots (19 km/h; 12 mph) (surfaced); 9,000 nautical miles (17,000 km; 10,000 mi) at 10 knots (19 km/h; 12 mph) (snorkel); 32.6 nautical miles (60.4 km; 37.5 mi) at 21 knots (39 km/h; 24 mph) (submerged); 480 nautical miles (890 km; 550 mi) at 4 knots (7.4 km/h; 4.6 mph) (submerged)
- Endurance: 70 days
- Test depth: Over 180 m (590 ft) (actual depth classified)
- Complement: Originally 42 (plus up to 12 trainees); Increased to 58 in 2009
- Sensors & processing systems: Radar: GEC-Marconi Type 1007 surface search radar; Sonar: Thales Scylla bow and distributed sonar arrays; Thales Karriwarra or Namara towed sonar array; ArgoPhoenix AR-740-US intercept array; Combat system: Modified Raytheon CCS Mk2
- Armament: 6 × 21-inch (530 mm) bow torpedo tubes; Payload: 22 torpedoes, mix of: Mark 48 Mod 7 CBASS torpedoes; UGM-84C Sub-Harpoon anti-ship missiles; Or: 44 Stonefish Mark III mines
- Notes: The sonars and combat system are in the process of being updated across the class, to be completed by 2010. These characteristics represent the updated equipment.

HMAS Collins (SSG 73) is the lead vessel of the six-submarine Collins class operated by the Royal Australian Navy (RAN).

Named for Vice Admiral Sir John Augustine Collins, Collins was laid down in February 1990, and was the only submarine of the class to be partially constructed by Kockums' Malmo shipyard. The boat was launched in August 1993, but was not completed until ten months later. Numerous problems with the class were exposed by the lengthy sea trials period undertaken by the boat; Collins was not commissioned into the RAN until mid-1996, eighteen months behind schedule, and the submarine was not cleared for operational deployments until 2000.

With the decommissioning of HMAS Anzac on 18 May 2024, Collins became the First Lady of the Fleet as the longest serving commissioned RAN vessel.

== Construction ==
Collins was laid down in February 1990. The two most complex sections of the first submarine were constructed by Kockums' shipyard in Malmö, Sweden, while the other four sections and complete assembly of the submarine occurred at Australian Submarine Corporation's facility in Port Adelaide, South Australia. It was originally planned to construct the first submarine completely overseas, but by the time the tender was awarded, it had been decided to build all six submarines in Australia; the increase in cost by not building the lead ship in the winning designer's home shipyard were believed to be offset by the additional experience provided to Australian industries.

While the bow section of the first boat was being assembled in Sweden, multiple defects in the hull welding were discovered. Different reasons were given by different parties for the problems: the steel alloy used for the hull required different welding techniques to those normally used by Kockums; the Swedish navy always requested partial penetration welds for their submarines, while the RAN wanted full penetration welding but failed to make this clear; delays in delivering the steel plates to Kockums resulted in rushing the work and the resulting drop in quality. It was proposed that the section be kept by Kockums to repair the welds, but it was decided to accept the section as-is and repair the welds at ASC to minimise delays in the project.

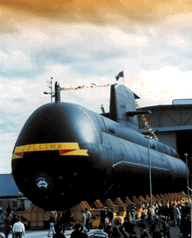
Launching of HMAS Collins

The launch of Collins was originally planned for 1994, but was later set for August 1993. The submarine was launched by shiplift on 28 August 1993. Although launched on schedule, she was not complete: the design of the submarine had not been finalised, important internal pipes and fittings had not been installed, the components of the combat system had not been delivered, and some sections of 'hull' were sheets of timber painted black so the submarine would appear complete in photographs of the launching ceremony. Within weeks of the launch, the boat was removed from the water, and it was not until June 1994 that she was completed. Work on the other submarines in the class was delayed by the extra effort put in for Collins to meet her launching date, and by the subsequent work to complete her. The submarines are covered in a skin of anechoic tiles to minimise detection by sonar: Collins was retrofitted with the tiles after the standard sonar signature of the submarine had been established, while the other five boats were covered during construction.

Collins was named for Vice Admiral Sir John Augustine Collins; famous for commanding HMAS Sydney during her Mediterranean deployment in 1940–41, and becoming the first Australian to command a naval squadron in 1944.

== Characteristics ==
The Collins class is an enlarged version of the Västergötland-class submarine designed by Kockums. At 77.42 metres (254.0 ft) in length, with a beam of 7.8 metres (26 ft) and a waterline depth of 7 metres (23 ft), displacing 3,051 tonnes when surfaced, and 3,353 tonnes when submerged, they are the largest conventionally powered submarines in the world. The hull is constructed from high-tensile micro-alloy steel, and are covered in a skin of anechoic tiles to minimise detection by sonar. The depth that they can dive to is classified: most sources claim that it is over 180 metres (590 ft),

The submarine is armed with six 21-inch (530 mm) torpedo tubes, and carry a standard payload of 22 torpedoes: originally a mix of Gould Mark 48 Mod 4 torpedoes and UGM-84C Sub-Harpoon, with the Mark 48s later upgraded to the Mod 7 Common Broadband Advanced Sonar System (CBASS) version.

Each submarine is equipped with three Garden Island-Hedemora HV V18b/15Ub (VB210) 18-cylinder diesel engines, which are each connected to a 1,400 kW, 440-volt DC Jeumont-Schneider generator. The electricity generated is stored in batteries, then supplied to a single Jeumont-Schneider DC motor, which provides 7,200 shaft horsepower to a single, seven-bladed, 4.22-metre (13.8 ft) diameter skewback propeller. The Collins class has a speed of 10.5 knots (19.4 km/h; 12.1 mph) when surfaced and at snorkel depth, and can reach 21 knots (39 km/h; 24 mph) underwater. The submarines have a range of 11,000 nautical miles (20,000 km; 13,000 mi) at 10 knots (19 km/h; 12 mph) when surfaced, 9,000 nautical miles (17,000 km; 10,000 mi) at 10 knots (19 km/h; 12 mph) at snorkel depth. When submerged completely, a Collins-class submarine can travel 32.6 nautical miles (60.4 km; 37.5 mi) at maximum speed, or 480 nautical miles (890 km; 550 mi) at 4 knots (7.4 km/h; 4.6 mph). Each boat has an endurance of 70 days.

== Sea trials ==
=== Training ===
Assembly of the crew for Collins began in 1992. Problems with the Collins trials began in mid-1992, when it was discovered that appropriate training materials and courses in the operation of the new submarine design had been poorly prepared, was inadequate, and often did not reflect the reality of operating the boats.

Several causes were identified: the late completion of the design made preparing training materials difficult, subcontractors did not always provide detailed information on the operation of their equipment, the combat system training was based on the completed version of the software and not the partial system installed in Collins, and the training assumed that none of the systems would break down. The last problem was part of an overall attitude that the first boat would be perfect off the production line and that no breakdowns would occur, and as a result, early equipment manuals tended to be light on content, and Collins would be sent to sea with few spare parts.

During sea trials, the submarine was often forced back to port because of equipment problems, where the Navy personnel found that ASC engineers would diagnose and repair systems using a combination of supplier data and diagnostic tools not available to the sailors. Problems with the training were compounded by an attitude from ASC that problems were always the fault of the Navy operators. However, most were the result of equipment failure, and the problems caused by operator error could be attributed to poor training or a lack of training, both of which were the responsibility of ASC.

To supplement this training, several officers and sailors assigned to Collins were sent to Sweden to train with the Swedish Navy aboard the Västergötland-class submarines; the class on which the Collins-class design was based.

=== Trials ===
Evaluation of the submarine was based on attaining a series of licenses, gradually testing the capabilities of Collins and those operating her from surface sailing to deep, unaccompanied dives. The main motor was started for the first time on 8 August 1994, as part of a series of 'basin trials'. Collins officially commenced sea trials at when she departed the ASC wharf at 10:00 on 31 October 1994. By the time the submarine had exited Port Adelaide, two of the three diesel generators had broken down. The submarine submerged for the first time on 9 November, remaining underwater for twelve hours.

The submarine was removed from the water at the end of 1994 to allow ASC to further complete the fitting out of the boat and perform repairs to the hull. Although sea trials resumed in early 1995, Collins did not dive again until 9 June, when it was decided that the status of the combat system drop was sufficient to allow further underwater tests of the submarine. The tests went without difficulty until the next day, when the anchor cable snapped in poor weather, forcing Collins to return to port. When approaching the ASC wharf, a programming problem with the propulsion switchboard caused the main motor to cut out. Collins drifted into the wharf, hitting the construction facility's shiplift at 2 to 3 knots (3.7 to 5.6 km/h; 2.3 to 3.5 mph). The backup motor then belatedly engaged, causing the submarine to collide with HMAS Protector, the ship assigned to assist in the submarine's sea trials. Repairs to the sonar dome cost A$250,000.

Deep diving tests were delayed until the acquisition of the submarine rescue vessel Remora in December 1995. Collins performed her first deep dive on 19 January 1996 without any problems. However, during a later deep dive trial, the propeller shaft seal began to leak excessively. Although designed to leak at 10 litres (2.2 imp gal; 2.6 US gal) an hour, the seal had previously shown itself to be faulty, with an hourly leak rate in the hundreds of litres. On this occasion, the water pressure meant the flow rate was significantly greater, to the point where the aft bilge pump was barely keeping up. When the senior engineer entered the compartment, he found personnel trying to stem the flow, including one sailor who was underneath the shaft, attempting to tighten the seal manually. The engineer instructed the commander to take the submarine to the surface as quickly as possible, but keep the boat level—had the engineer instead informed the commander that the submarine was flooding, Collins would have blown all ballast and driven for the surface at a steep angle, likely drowning the sailor under the shaft. Collins reached the surface without further incident. Modified seals were fitted to all submarines to bring the leak back to the accepted rate. It was later calculated that the submarine was taking on water at over 1,000 litres (220 imp gal; 260 US gal) a minute.

Multiple mechanical problems appeared during the sea trials. Many of the problems encountered in Collins were quickly repaired, and did not occur again or in the other five submarines. Recurring issues were usually associated with diesel engines, propeller shaft seals, periscopes and masts, hydraulic couplings, and the combat system. At the same time, many of the systems worked with few or no problems, with the submarine meeting or exceeding design specifications for maximum speed, manoeuvrability, and submerged endurance, particularly at low speeds. The ship control system, which had been a major concern during development of the class, functioned beyond positive expectation. The submarine's autopilot (which aboard Collins was nicknamed 'Sven') was found to be better at depth keeping during snorting than many of the operators.

Collins was due to be commissioned in November 1995. The submarine was not commissioned into the RAN until 27 July 1996; eighteen months behind schedule, because of several delays and problems, most relating to the provision and installation of the combat data system software. Collins was not approved for operational deployments until 2000.

== Operational history ==
In May 1997, two groups of six female sailors were posted to Collins and Farncomb as a test on the feasibility of mixed-sex crews aboard submarines. Following the trial's success, eleven female sailors and one female officer commenced training for the submarine service in 1998.

In mid-2000, Collins was sent to Ketchikan, Alaska for noise testing with the United States Navy. Although noise testing in Australia was believed to have been affected by natural background noise, the Alaskan tests confirmed the Australian results. Low-speed testing showed that the Collins class was almost undetectable at patrol speed.

In August 2000, Collins became the first of her class to fire a Harpoon missile.

When Collins returned to the ASC facility in April 2001 for a year-long maintenance docking, multiple welding defects were found in both the bow and escape tower sections of the submarine—the two sections constructed by Kockums, while almost no problems were found in the welding of the four Australian-built sections. Repairing these welds quadrupled the time Collins spent in dock.

Collins completed a full-cycle docking at ASC on 29 July 2005. During this period she was modified to improve her ability to land special forces personnel.

In July 2009, while exercising in the Great Australian Bight, two of the three diesel generators aboard Collins failed, forcing the submarine to limp back to base. The cause was believed to be errors during the submarine's last refit, with the boat undergoing major maintenance as of December 2009. Although back in service by February 2010, the boat was limited in her duties, but was predicted to be fully operational by May 2010. The Australian government is seeking A$5 million in compensation from ASC for the error.

During the first part of 2012, Collins participated in numerous naval exercises, before commencing a full-cycle maintenance docking.

The submarines are predicted to have an operational life of around 30 years, with Collins to be decommissioned around 2025.
