= Microalloyed steel =

Type of steel with small amounts of alloying elements

Microalloyed steel is a type of alloy steel that contains small amounts of alloying elements (0.05 to 0.15%), including niobium, vanadium, titanium, molybdenum, zirconium, boron, and rare-earth metals. They are used to refine the grain microstructure or facilitate precipitation hardening.

In terms of performance and cost, microalloyed steels are between a carbon steel and a low alloy steel. Their yield strength is between 275 and 750 MPa (40 and 110 ksi) without heat treatment. Weldability is good, and can even be improved by reducing carbon content while maintaining strength. Fatigue life and wear resistance are superior to similar heat-treated steels. The disadvantages are that ductility and toughness are not as good as quenched and tempered (Q&T) steels. They must also be cooled enough for all of the alloys to be in solution; after forming, the material must be quickly cooled to 540 to 600 °C (1,004 to 1,112 °F).

Cold-worked microalloyed steels do not require as much cold working to achieve the same strength as other carbon steel; this also leads to greater ductility. Hot-worked microalloyed steels can be used from the air-cooled state. If controlled cooling is used, the material can produce mechanical properties similar to Q&T steels. Machinability is better than Q&T steels because of their more uniform hardness and their ferrite-pearlite microstructure.

Because microalloyed steels are not quenched and tempered, they are not susceptible to quench cracking, nor do they need to be straightened or stress relieved. However, because of this, they are through-hardened and do not have a softer and tougher core like quench and tempered steels.
