= Kokuryu =

Kokuryu may refer to:

- Kokuryū A Japanese form of Martial Arts founded in the mid-1970s as a new combination of several existing arts
- Goguryeo - A Korean kingdom
- Kokuryū (S 506) - sixth of Japan's Sōryū-class submarines launched in 2013
- Black Dragon Society "Kokuryukai" - Japanese paramilitary society
- JS Kokuryū (SS-506), a Japanese Sōryū-class submarine
