= Attack class =

Attack class may refer to:

- Attack-class patrol boat, a former class of coastal defence vessels operated the Royal Australian Navy
- Attack-class submarine, a proposed Australian class of conventional submarines
