= JS Sekiryū =

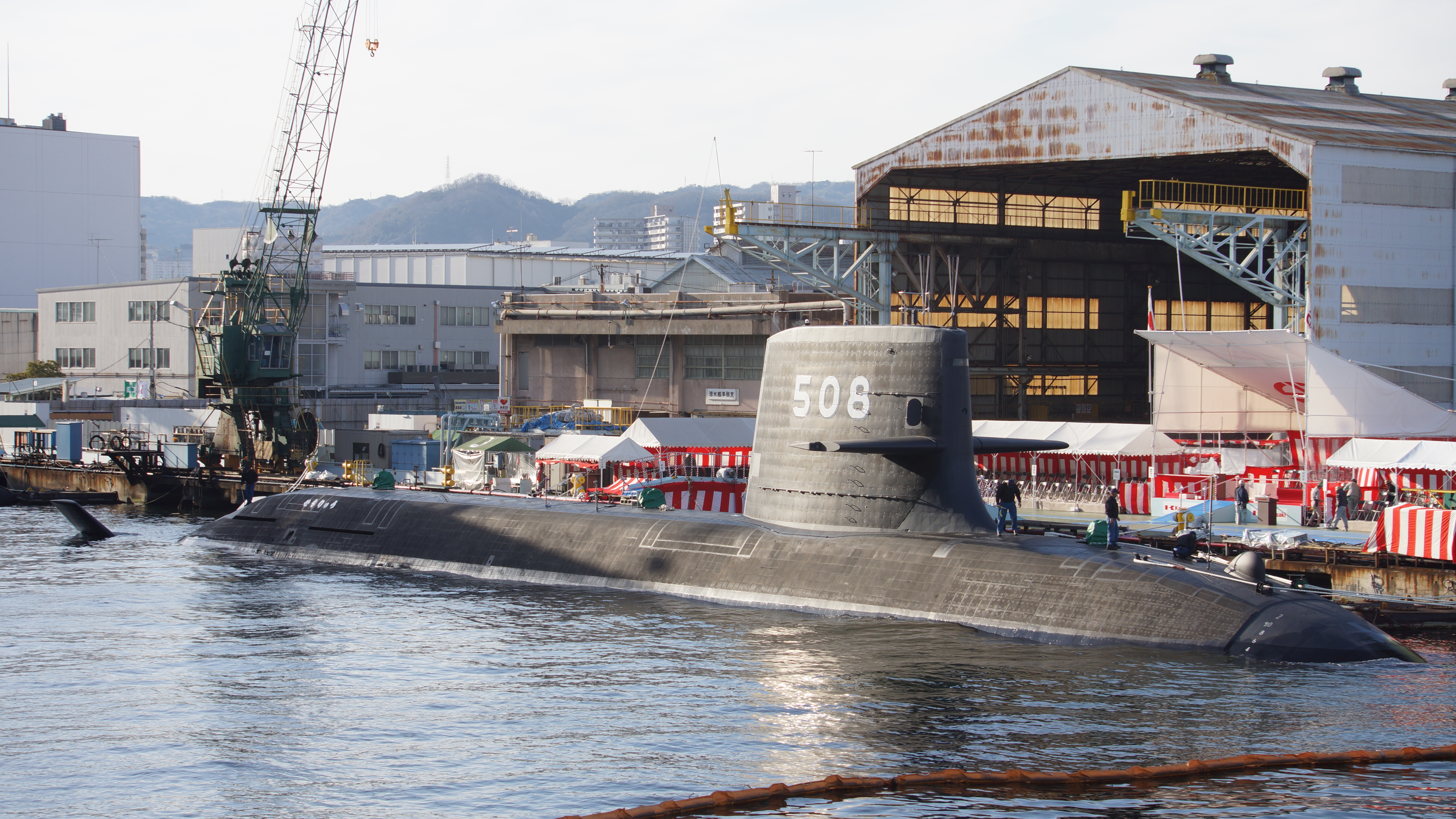
- JS Sekiryū at Kobe on 12 March 2017

History

Japan
- Name: Sekiryū; (せきりゅう)
- Namesake: Red dragon (赤龍)
- Ordered: 2012
- Builder: Kawasaki Heavy Industries
- Cost: ¥64.3 billion
- Laid down: 15 March 2013
- Launched: 2 November 2015
- Commissioned: 13 March 2017
- Home port: Kure
- Identification: SS-508
- Status: Active

General characteristics
- Class & type: Sōryū-class attack submarine
- Displacement: Surfaced: 2,900 tonnes (2,854 long tons); Submerged: 4,200 t (4,134 long tons)
- Length: 84.0 m (275 ft 7 in)
- Beam: 9.1 m (29 ft 10 in)
- Draught: 8.5 m (27 ft 11 in)
- Propulsion: 1-shaft 2× Kawasaki 12V 25/25 SB-type diesel engines diesel-electric; 4× Kawasaki Kockums V4-275R Stirling engines; 3,900 hp (2,900 kW) surfaced; 8,000 hp (6,000 kW) submerged
- Speed: Surfaced: 13 kn (24 km/h; 15 mph); Submerged: 20 kn (37 km/h; 23 mph)
- Range: AIP endurance (est.): 6,100 nautical miles (11,300 km; 7,000 mi) at 6.5 knots (12.0 km/h; 7.5 mph)
- Complement: 65 (9 officers, 56 enlisted)
- Sensors & processing systems: ZPS-6F surface/low-level air search radar; Hughes/Oki ZQQ-7 Sonar suite: 1× bow-array, 4× LF flank arrays and 1× Towed array sonar
- Electronic warfare & decoys: ZLR-3-6 ESM equipment; 2× 3-inch underwater countermeasure launcher tubes for launching of Acoustic Device Countermeasures (ADCs)
- Armament: 6 × HU-606 21 in (533 mm) torpedo tubes with 30 reloads for: 1.) Type 89 torpedo; 2.) Harpoon (missile); Mines

JS Sekiryū (SS-508) is the eighth boat of Sōryū-class submarines. She was commissioned into the Japan Maritime Self-Defense Force on 13 March 2017.

== Construction and career ==
Sekiryū was laid down at Kawasaki Heavy Industries Kobe Shipyard on March 15, 2013, as the 2012 plan 2900-ton submarine No. 8123 based on the medium-term defense capability development plan. At the launching ceremony, it was named Sekiryū and launched on 2 November 2015. She was commissioned on 13 March 2017 and deployed to Kure.

Sekiryū homeport is Kure.

== Gallery ==
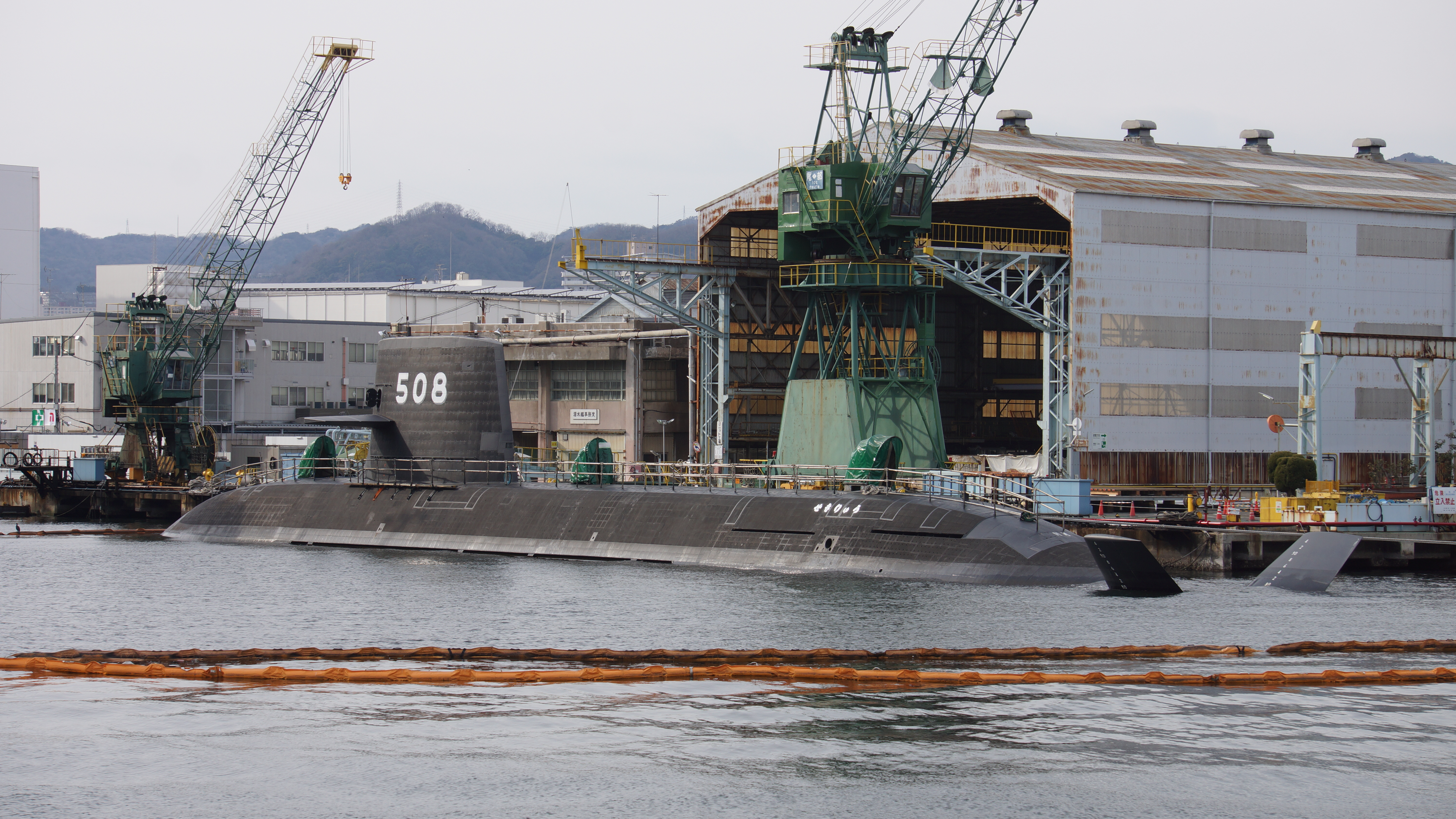
JS Sekiryū at Kobe on 26 February 2017.

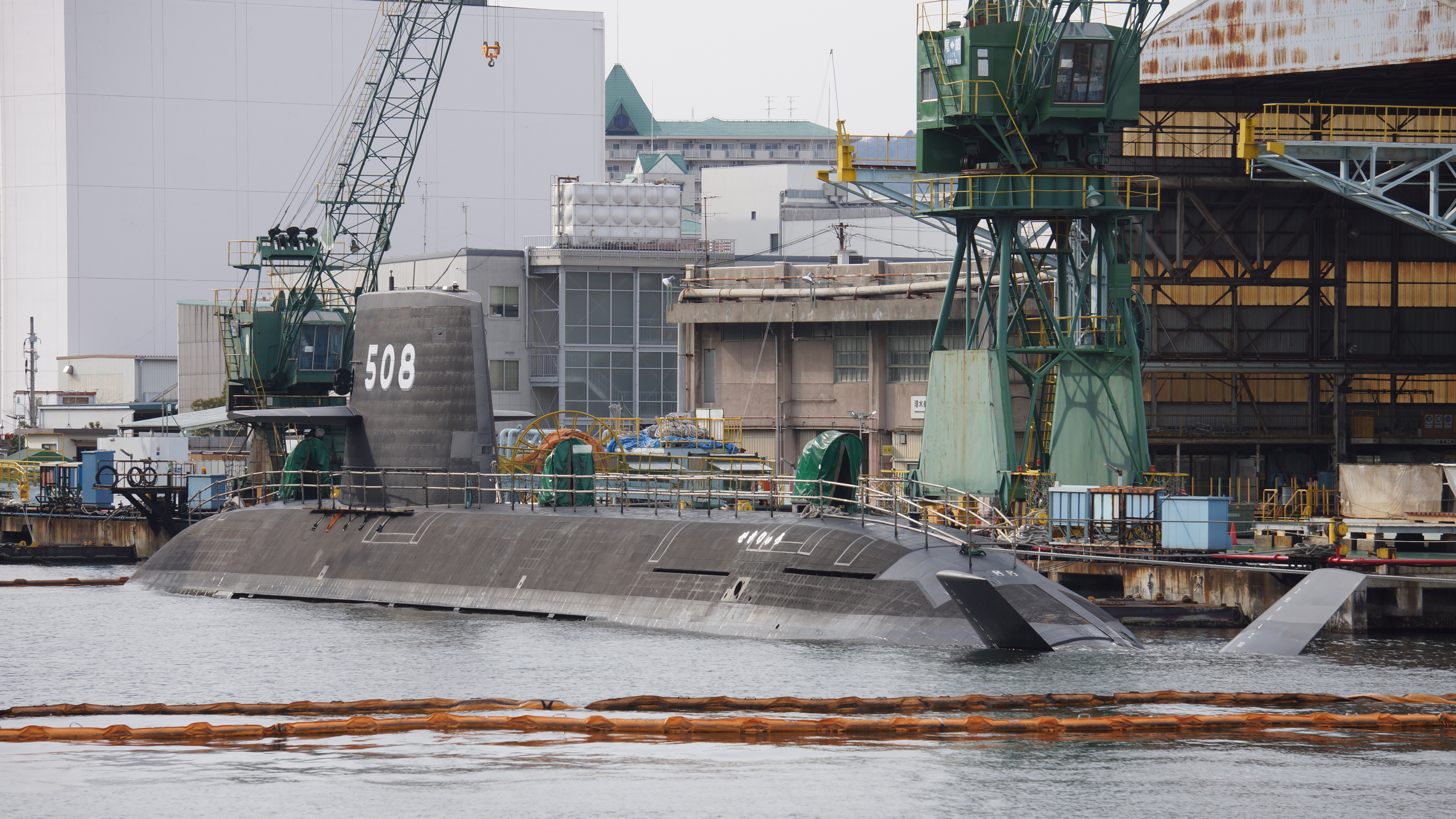
JS Sekiryū at Kobe on 26 February 2017.
