= JS Shōryū =

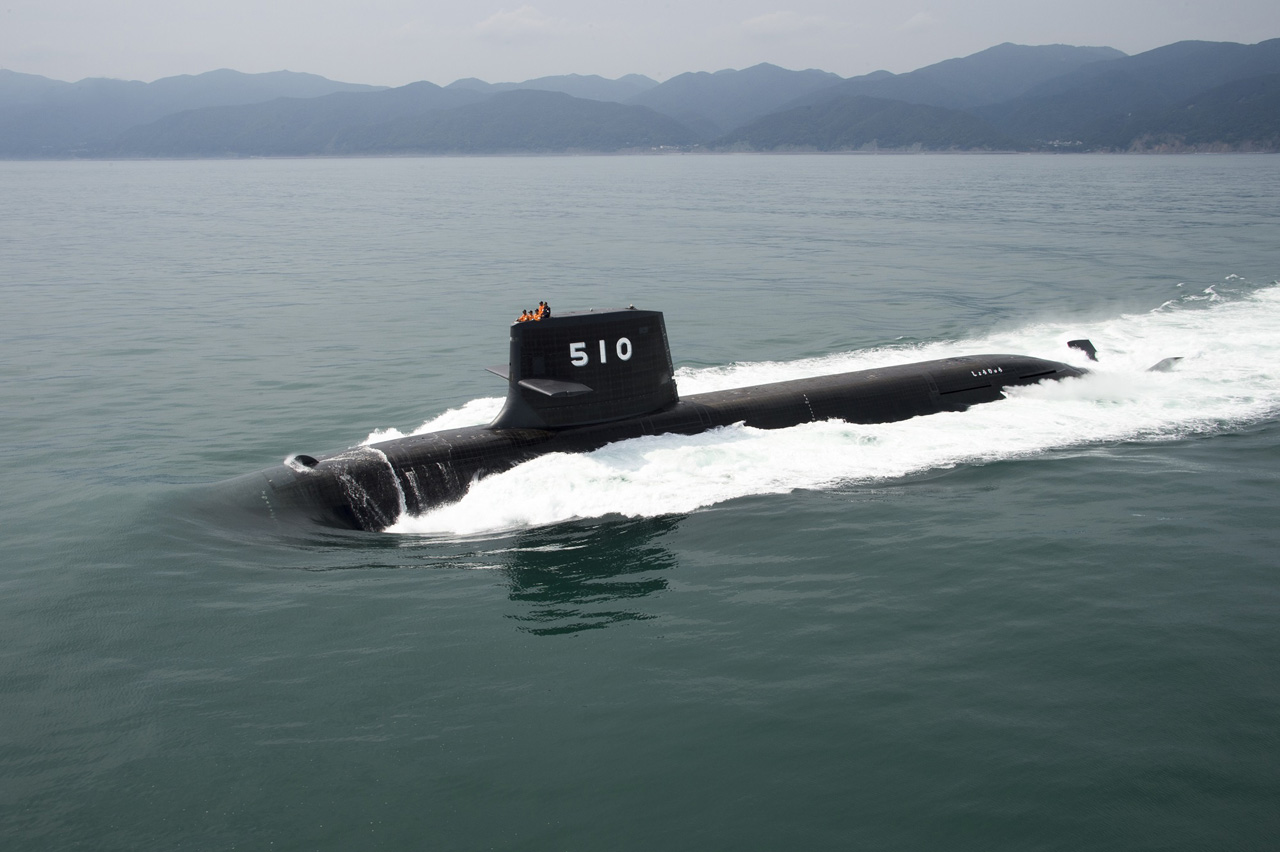
- JS Shōryū

History

Japan
- Name: Shōryū; (しょうりゅう)
- Namesake: Dragon overlooking the ground (翔龍)
- Ordered: 2014
- Builder: Kawasaki Heavy Industries
- Cost: ¥64.3 billion
- Laid down: 28 January 2015
- Launched: 6 November 2017
- Commissioned: 18 March 2019
- Home port: Kure
- Identification: SS-510
- Status: Active

General characteristics
- Class & type: Sōryū-class attack submarine
- Displacement: Surfaced: 2,900 tonnes (2,854 long tons); Submerged: 4,200 t (4,134 long tons)
- Length: 84.0 m (275 ft 7 in)
- Beam: 9.1 m (29 ft 10 in)
- Draught: 8.5 m (27 ft 11 in)
- Propulsion: 1-shaft 2× Kawasaki 12V 25/25 SB-type diesel engines diesel-electric; 4× Kawasaki Kockums V4-275R Stirling engines; 3,900 hp (2,900 kW) surfaced; 8,000 hp (6,000 kW) submerged
- Speed: Surfaced: 13 kn (24 km/h; 15 mph); Submerged: 20 kn (37 km/h; 23 mph)
- Range: AIP endurance (est.): 6,100 nautical miles (11,300 km; 7,000 mi) at 6.5 knots (12.0 km/h; 7.5 mph)
- Complement: 65 (9 officers, 56 enlisted)
- Sensors & processing systems: ZPS-6F surface/low-level air search radar; Hughes/Oki ZQQ-7 Sonar suite: 1× bow-array, 4× LF flank arrays and 1× Towed array sonar
- Electronic warfare & decoys: ZLR-3-6 ESM equipment; 2× 3-inch underwater countermeasure launcher tubes for launching of Acoustic Device Countermeasures (ADCs)
- Armament: 6 × HU-606 21 in (533 mm) torpedo tubes with 30 reloads for: 1.) Type 89 torpedo; 2.) Harpoon (missile); Mines

JS Shōryū (SS-510) is the tenth boat of Sōryū-class submarines operated by the Japan Maritime Self-Defense Force. She was commissioned on 18 March 2019.

== Construction and career ==
Shōryū was laid down at Kawasaki Heavy Industries Kobe Shipyard on January 28, 2015, as the 2014 plan 2900-ton submarine No. 8125 based on the medium-term defense capability development plan. At the launching ceremony, she was named Shōryū and launched on 6 November 2017. She was commissioned on 18 March 2019 and deployed to Kure.

Shōryū homeport is Kure.

On October 9, 2020, anti-submarine warfare training was conducted with the escort vessels JS Kaga and JS Ikazuchi which were participating in the Reiwa 2nd Indo-Pacific dispatch training in the South China Sea.

== Gallery ==
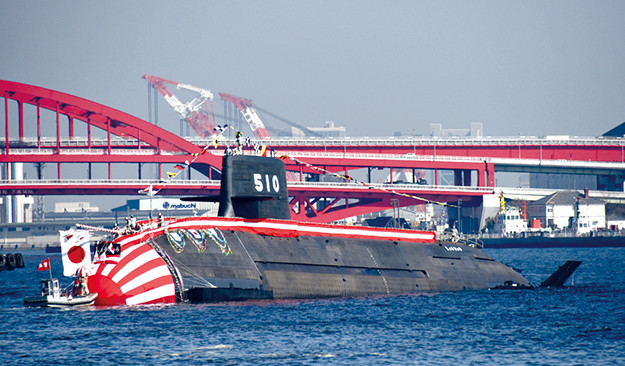
JS Shōryū being launched at Kobe on 1 December 2017.

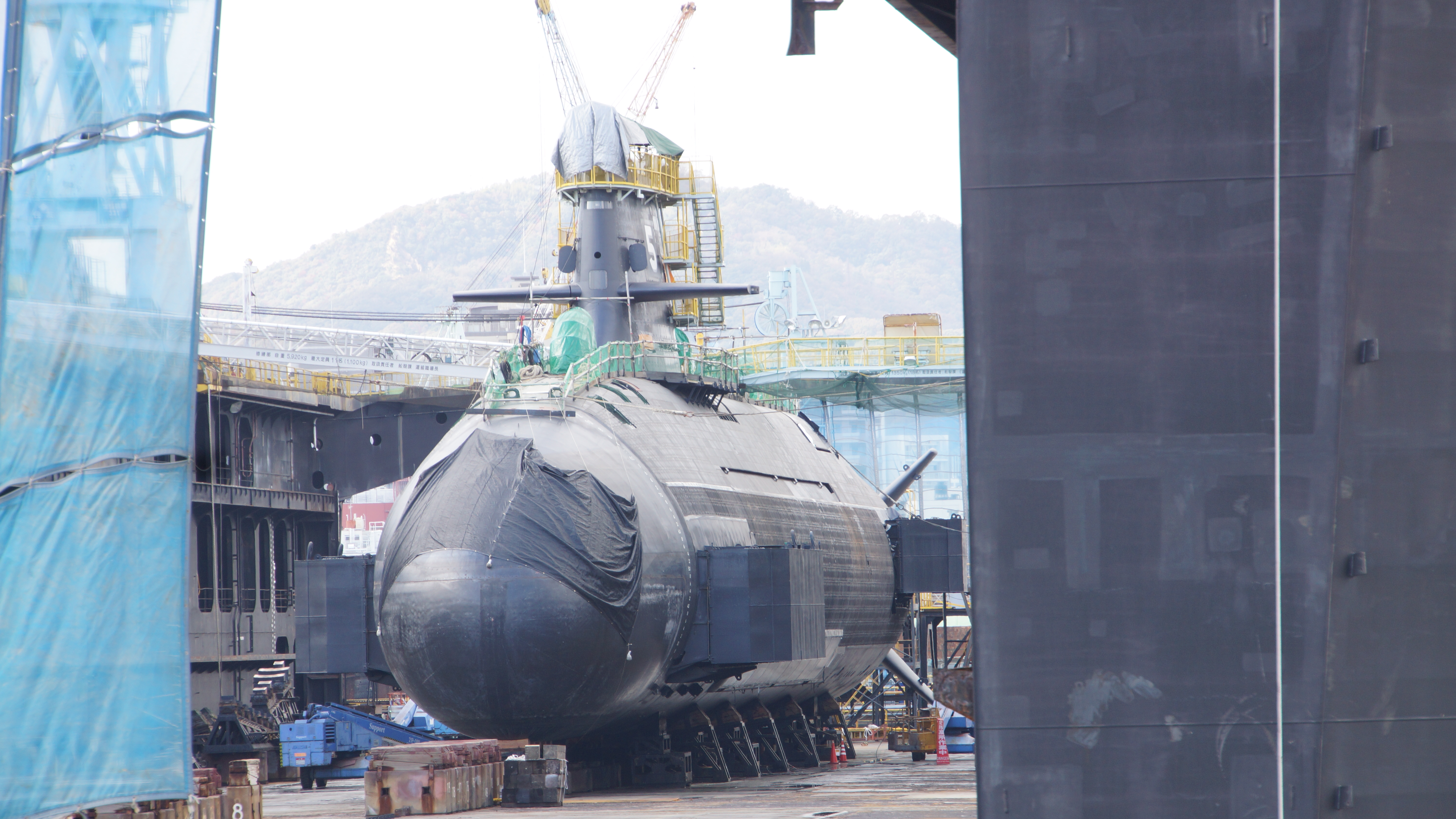
JS Shōryū at Kobe on 11 November 2017.

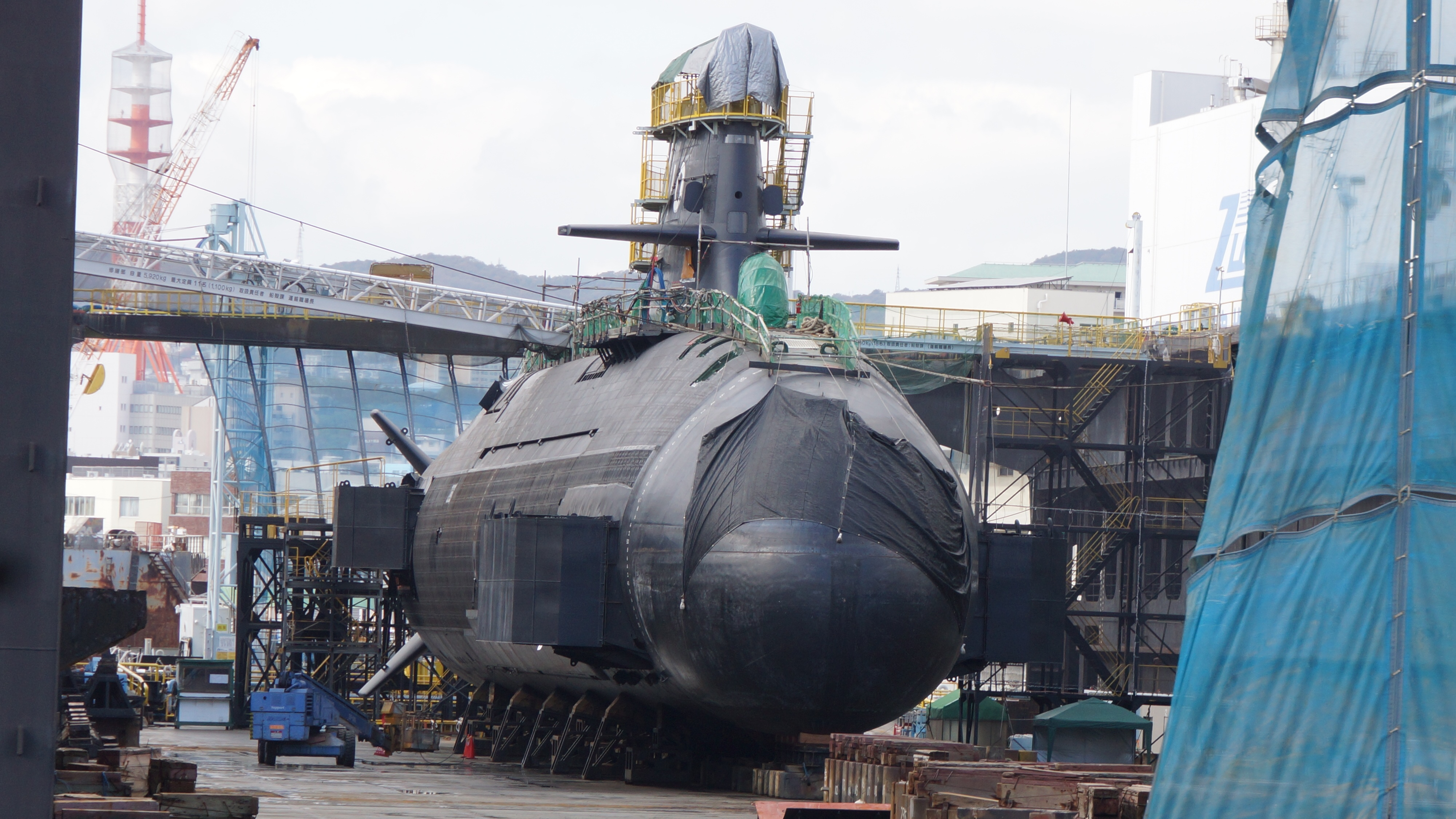
JS Shōryū at Kobe on 11 November 2017.
