= JS Zuiryū =

Sōryū-class submarine of the Japanese Navy (2008)

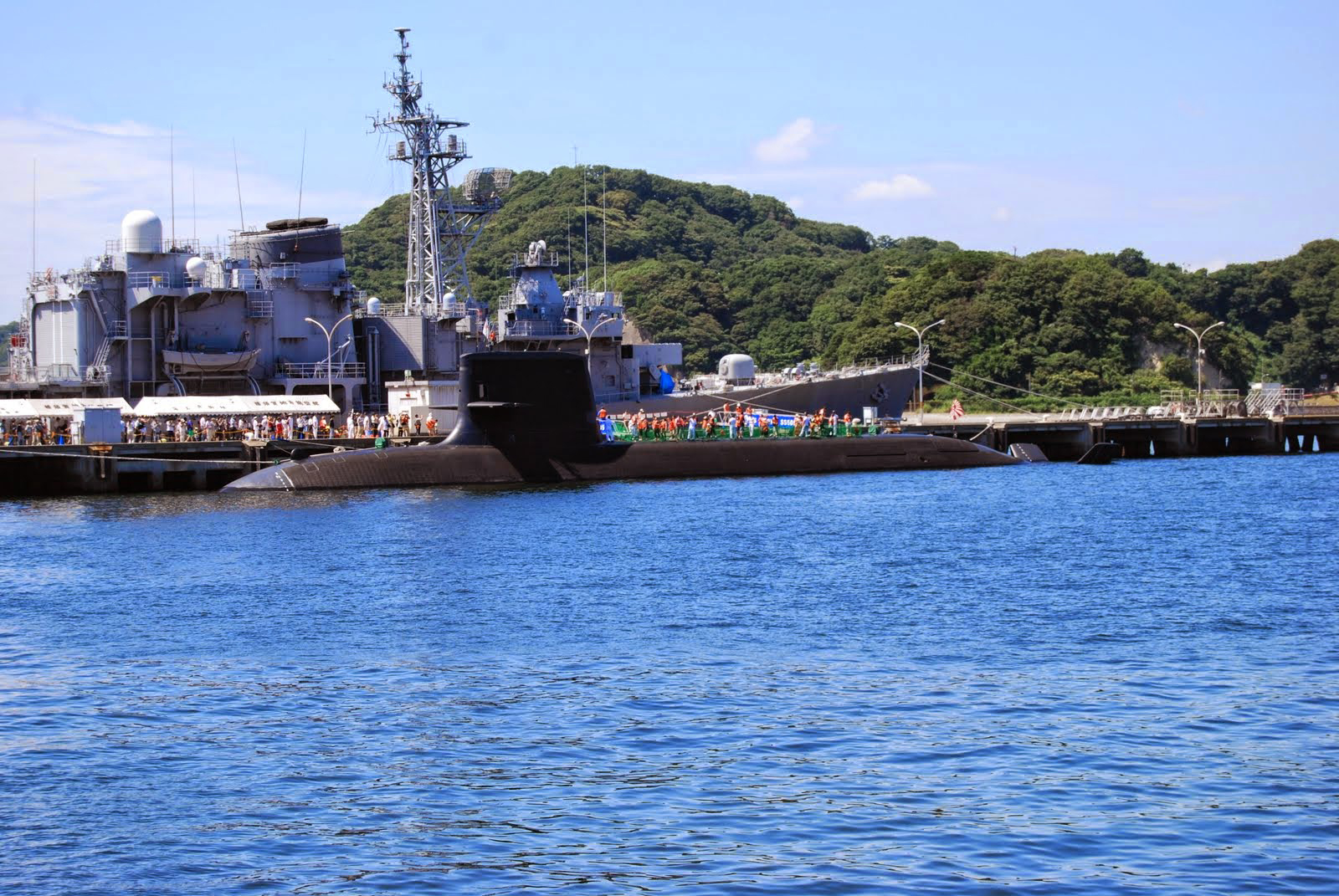
- JS Zuiryū at Yokosuka on 2 August 2014

History

Japan
- Name: Zuiryū; (ずいりゅう)
- Namesake: Auspicious dragon
- Ordered: 2008
- Builder: Mitsubishi Heavy Industries
- Cost: ¥64.3 billion
- Laid down: 16 March 2009
- Launched: 20 October 2011
- Commissioned: 6 March 2013
- Home port: Yokosuka
- Identification: SS-505
- Status: Active

General characteristics
- Class & type: Sōryū-class attack submarine
- Displacement: Surfaced: 2,900 tonnes (2,854 long tons); Submerged: 4,200 t (4,134 long tons)
- Length: 84.0 m (275 ft 7 in)
- Beam: 9.1 m (29 ft 10 in)
- Draught: 8.5 m (27 ft 11 in)
- Propulsion: 1-shaft 2× Kawasaki 12V 25/25 SB-type diesel engines diesel-electric; 4× Kawasaki Kockums V4-275R Stirling engines; 3,900 hp (2,900 kW) surfaced; 8,000 hp (6,000 kW) submerged
- Speed: Surfaced: 13 kn (24 km/h; 15 mph); Submerged: 20 kn (37 km/h; 23 mph)
- Range: AIP endurance (est.): 6,100 nautical miles (11,300 km; 7,000 mi) at 6.5 knots (12.0 km/h; 7.5 mph)
- Complement: 65 (9 officers, 56 enlisted)
- Sensors & processing systems: ZPS-6F surface/low-level air search radar; Hughes/Oki ZQQ-7 Sonar suite: 1× bow-array, 4× LF flank arrays and 1× Towed array sonar
- Electronic warfare & decoys: ZLR-3-6 ESM equipment; 2× 3-inch underwater countermeasure launcher tubes for launching of Acoustic Device Countermeasures (ADCs)
- Armament: 6 × HU-606 21 in (533 mm) torpedo tubes with 30 reloads for: 1.) Type 89 torpedo; 2.) Harpoon (missile); Mines

JS Zuiryū (SS-505) is the fifth boat of Sōryū-class submarines, operated by the Japan Maritime Self-Defense Force. She was commissioned on 6 March 2013.

== Construction and career ==
Zuiryū was laid down at Mitsubishi Heavy Industries Kobe Shipyard on 16 March 2009, as the 2008 plan 2900-ton submarine No. 8120 based on the medium-term defense capability development plan. At the launching ceremony, she was named Zuiryū and launched on 20 October 2011. She was commissioned on 6 March 2013 and deployed to Yokosuka.

From 1 July to 3 October 2017, she participated in US dispatch training and conducted offshore training and facility utilization training in the Guam and Hawaiian Islands areas.

On 30 September 2018, the ship provided Shigeru Joshima and Tomoya Nagase with Navy curry on the NTV TV program "The! Tetsuwan! DASH !!"

From 12 September to 18 December 2019, she would participate in US dispatch training and conduct offshore training and facility use training in the Hawaiian Islands area.

Zuiryū's homeport is Yokosuka.

== Gallery ==
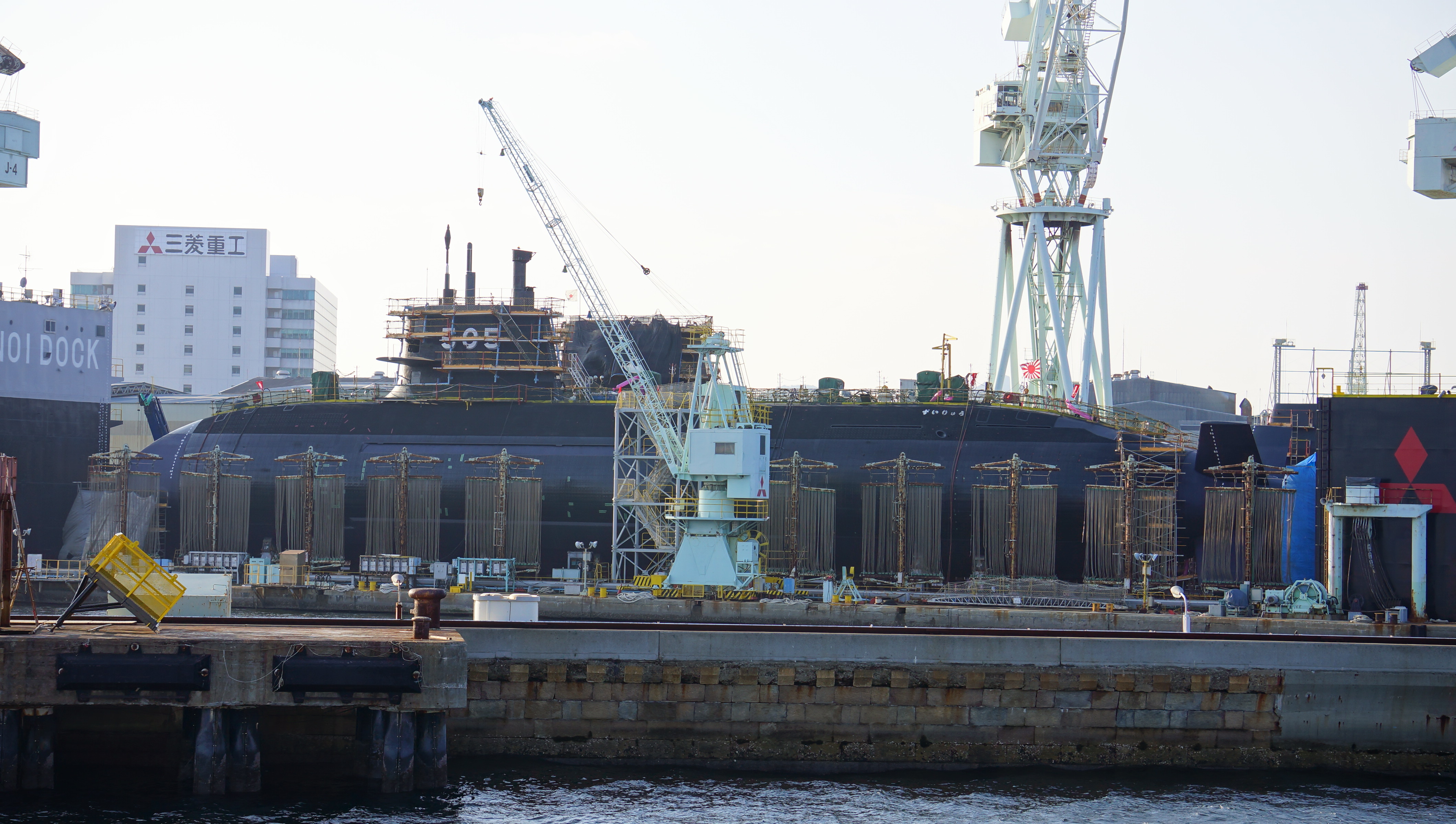
JS Zuiryū at Kobe on 16 December 2012.

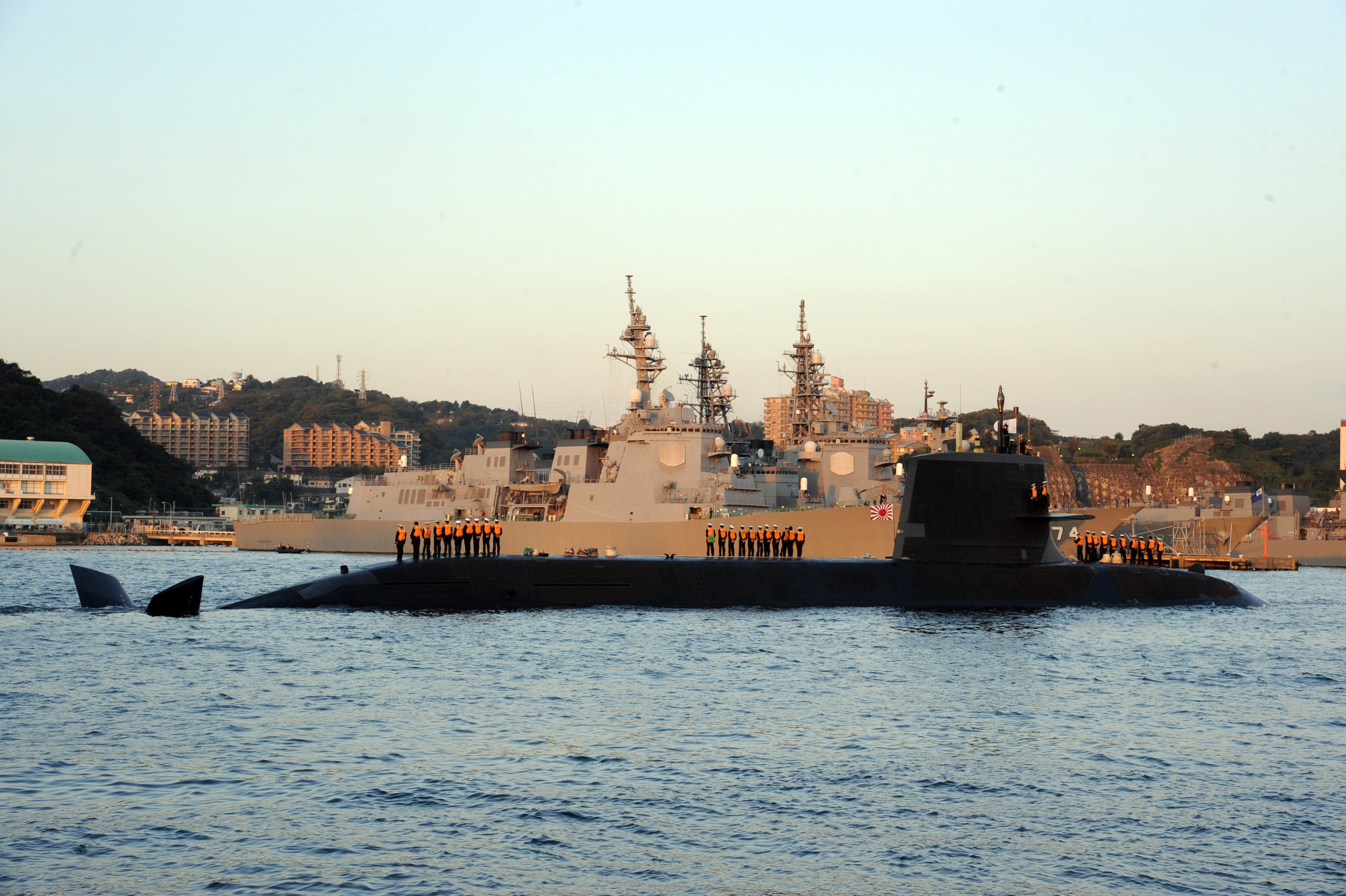
JS Zuiryū, date unknown.

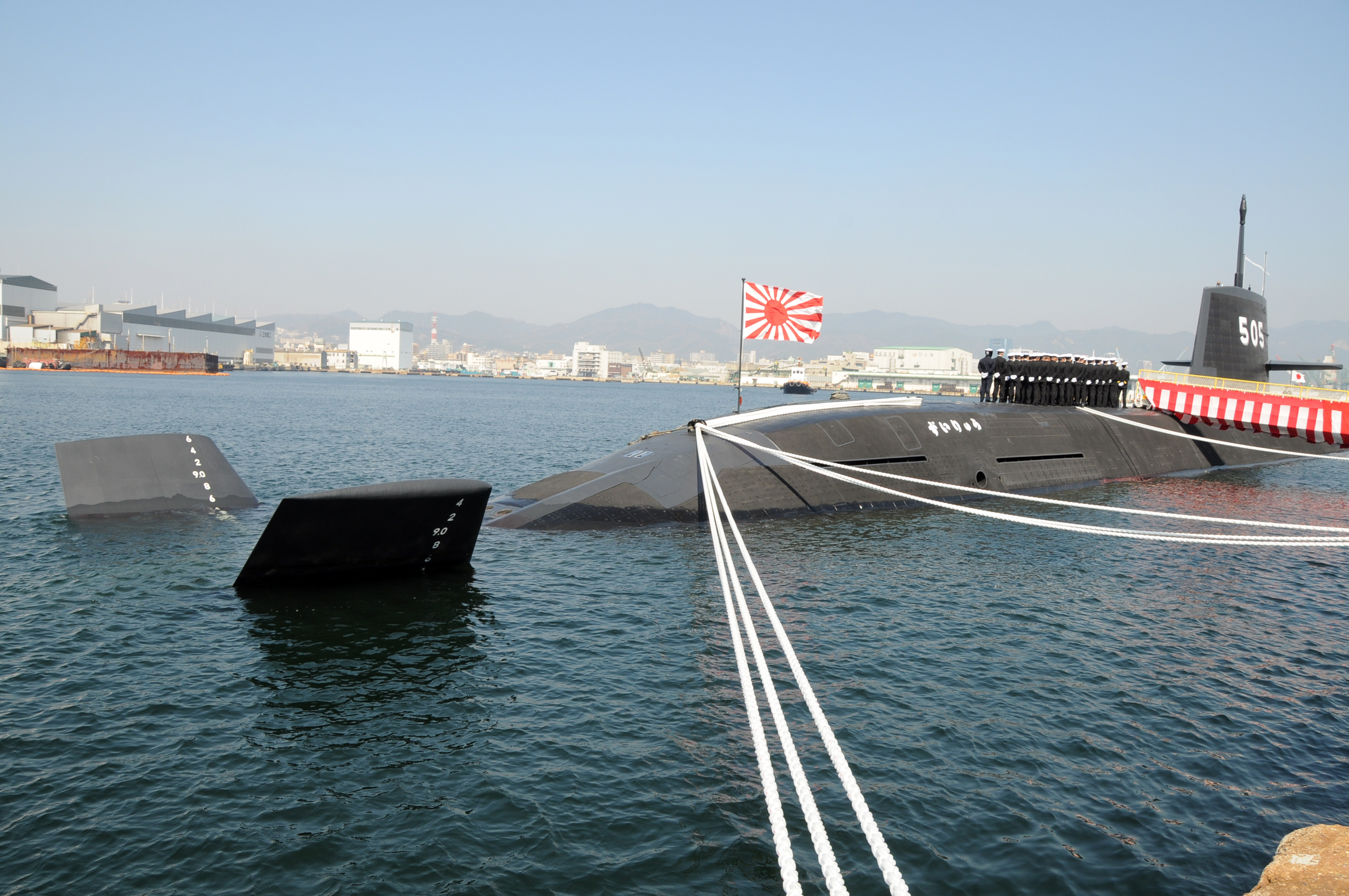
JS Zuiryū, date unknown.
