= JS Seiryū =

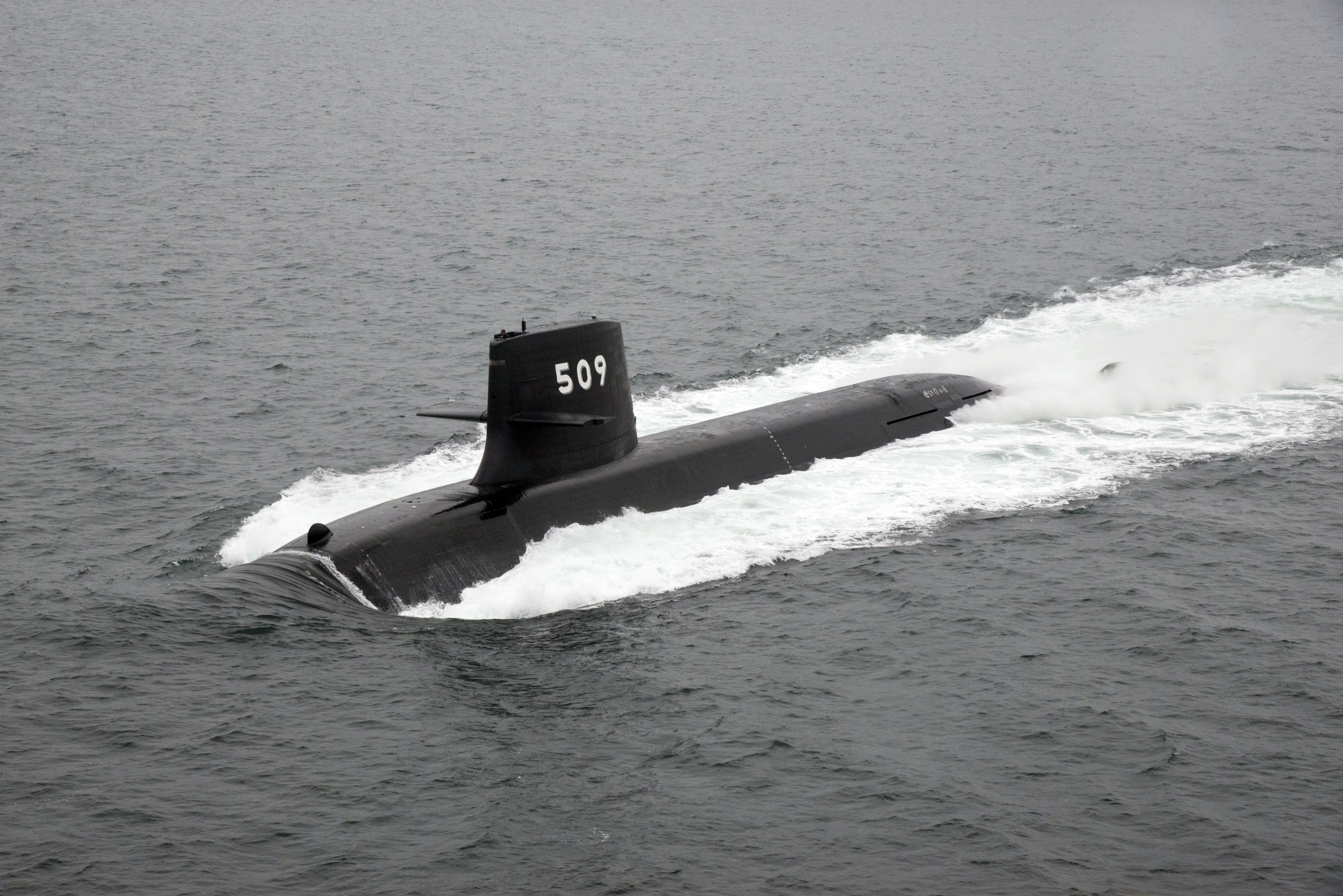
- JS Seiryū

History

Japan
- Name: Seiryū; (せいりゅう)
- Namesake: Seiryūgongen (清瀧権現)
- Ordered: 2013
- Builder: Mitsubishi Heavy Industries
- Cost: ¥64.3 billion
- Laid down: 22 October 2013
- Launched: 12 October 2016
- Commissioned: 12 March 2018
- Home port: Yokosuka
- Identification: SS-509
- Status: Active

General characteristics
- Class & type: Sōryū-class attack submarine
- Displacement: Surfaced: 2,900 tonnes (2,854 long tons); Submerged: 4,200 t (4,134 long tons)
- Length: 84.0 m (275 ft 7 in)
- Beam: 9.1 m (29 ft 10 in)
- Draught: 8.5 m (27 ft 11 in)
- Propulsion: 1-shaft 2× Kawasaki 12V 25/25 SB-type diesel engines diesel-electric; 4× Kawasaki Kockums V4-275R Stirling engines; 3,900 hp (2,900 kW) surfaced; 8,000 hp (6,000 kW) submerged
- Speed: Surfaced: 13 kn (24 km/h; 15 mph); Submerged: 20 kn (37 km/h; 23 mph)
- Range: AIP endurance (est.): 6,100 nautical miles (11,300 km; 7,000 mi) at 6.5 knots (12.0 km/h; 7.5 mph)
- Complement: 65 (9 officers, 56 enlisted)
- Sensors & processing systems: ZPS-6F surface/low-level air search radar; Hughes/Oki ZQQ-7 Sonar suite: 1× bow-array, 4× LF flank arrays and 1× Towed array sonar
- Electronic warfare & decoys: ZLR-3-6 ESM equipment; 2× 3-inch underwater countermeasure launcher tubes for launching of Acoustic Device Countermeasures (ADCs)
- Armament: 6 × HU-606 21 in (533 mm) torpedo tubes with 30 reloads for: 1.) Type 89 torpedo; 2.) Harpoon (missile); Mines

JS Seiryū (SS-509) is the ninth boat of Sōryū-class submarines. She was commissioned into the Japan Maritime Self-Defense Force on 12 March 2018.

== Construction and career ==
Seiryū was laid down at Mitsubishi Heavy Industries Kobe Shipyard on October 22, 2013, as the 2013 plan 2900-ton submarine No. 8124 based on the medium-term defense capability development plan. At the launching ceremony, she was named Seiryū and launched on 12 October 2016. She was commissioned on 12 March 2018 and deployed to Yokosuka, which became her homeport.

== Gallery ==
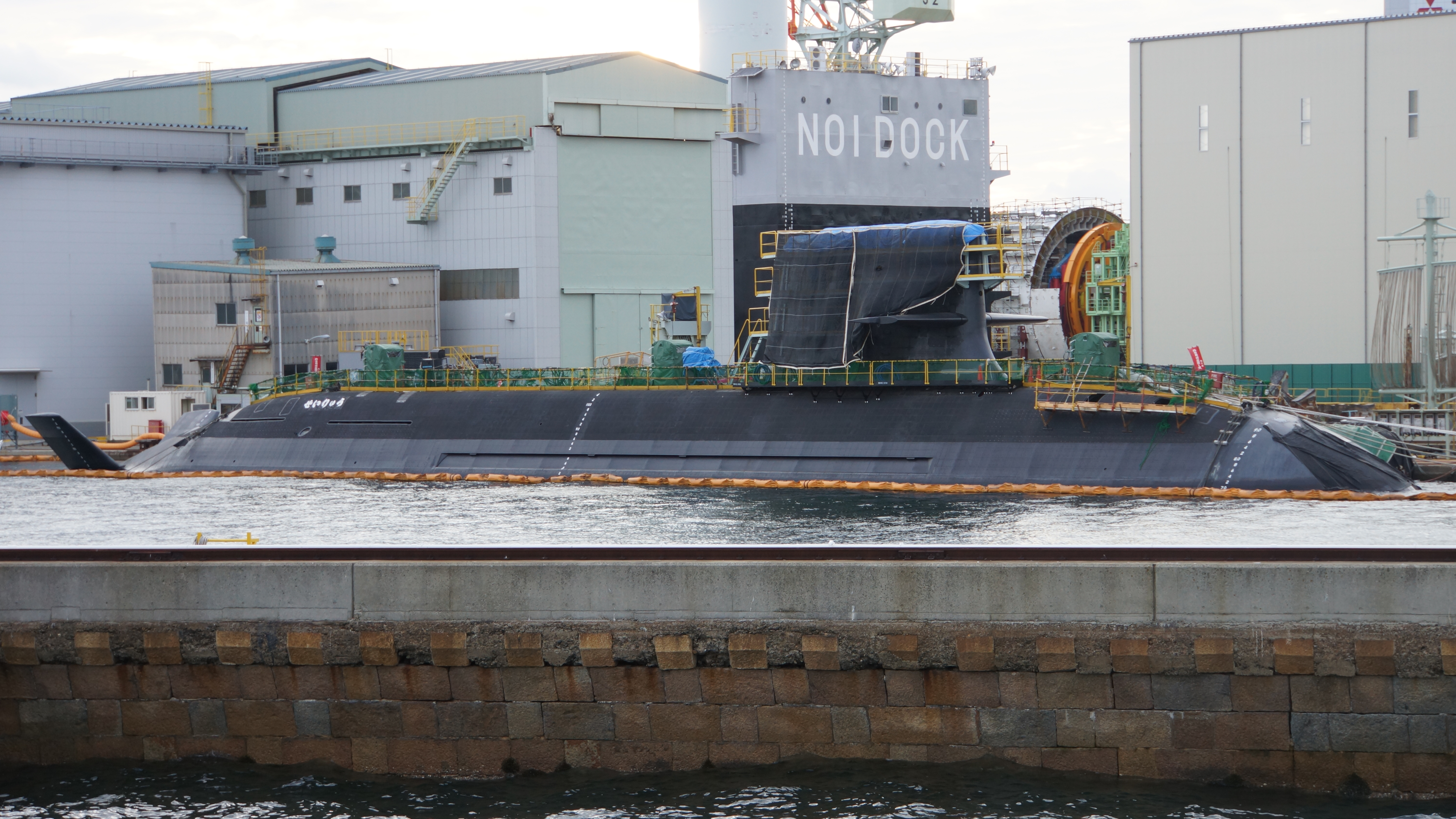
JS Seiryū at Kobe on 23 October 2016.

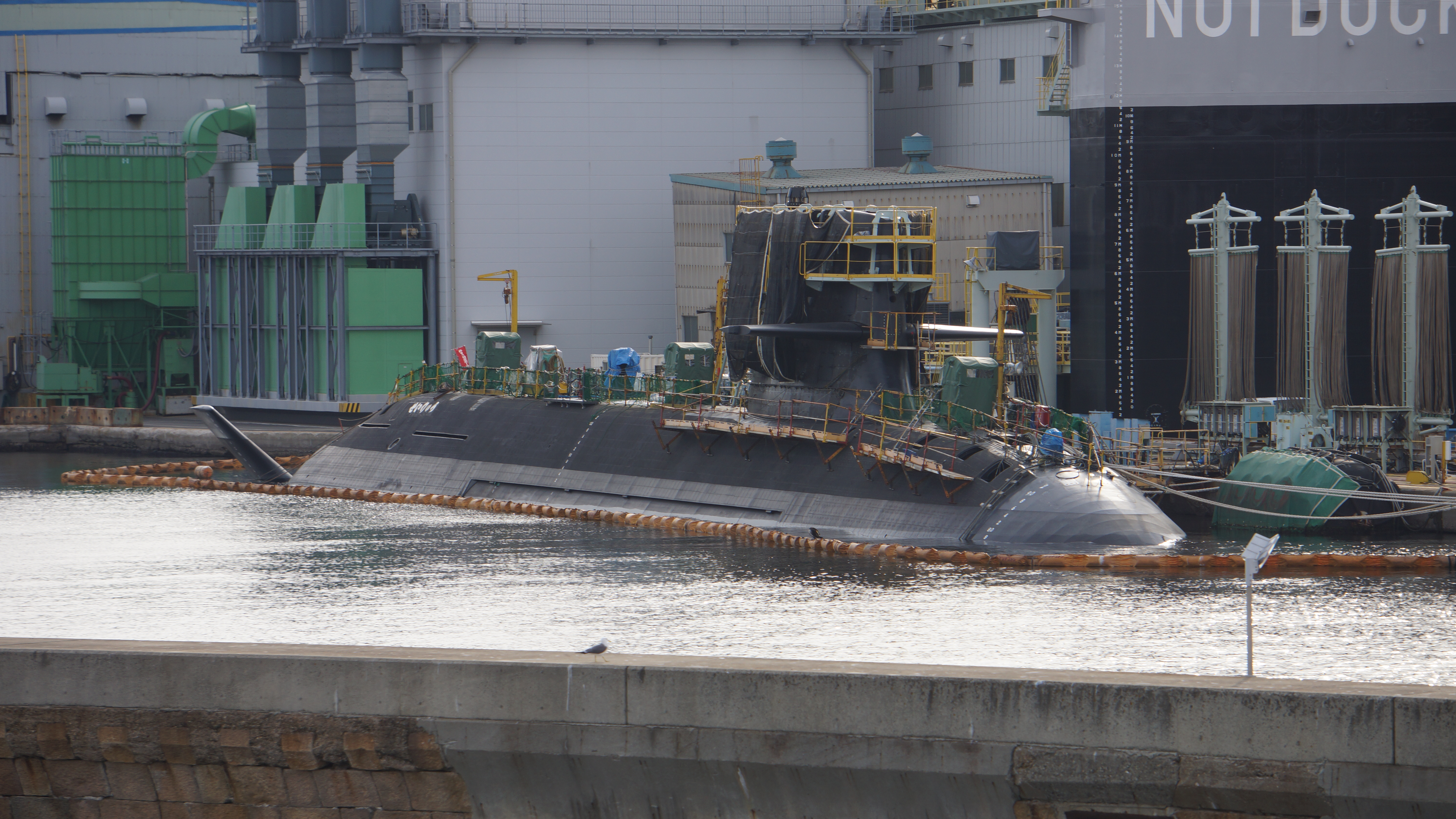
JS Seiryū at Kobe on 23 October 2016.

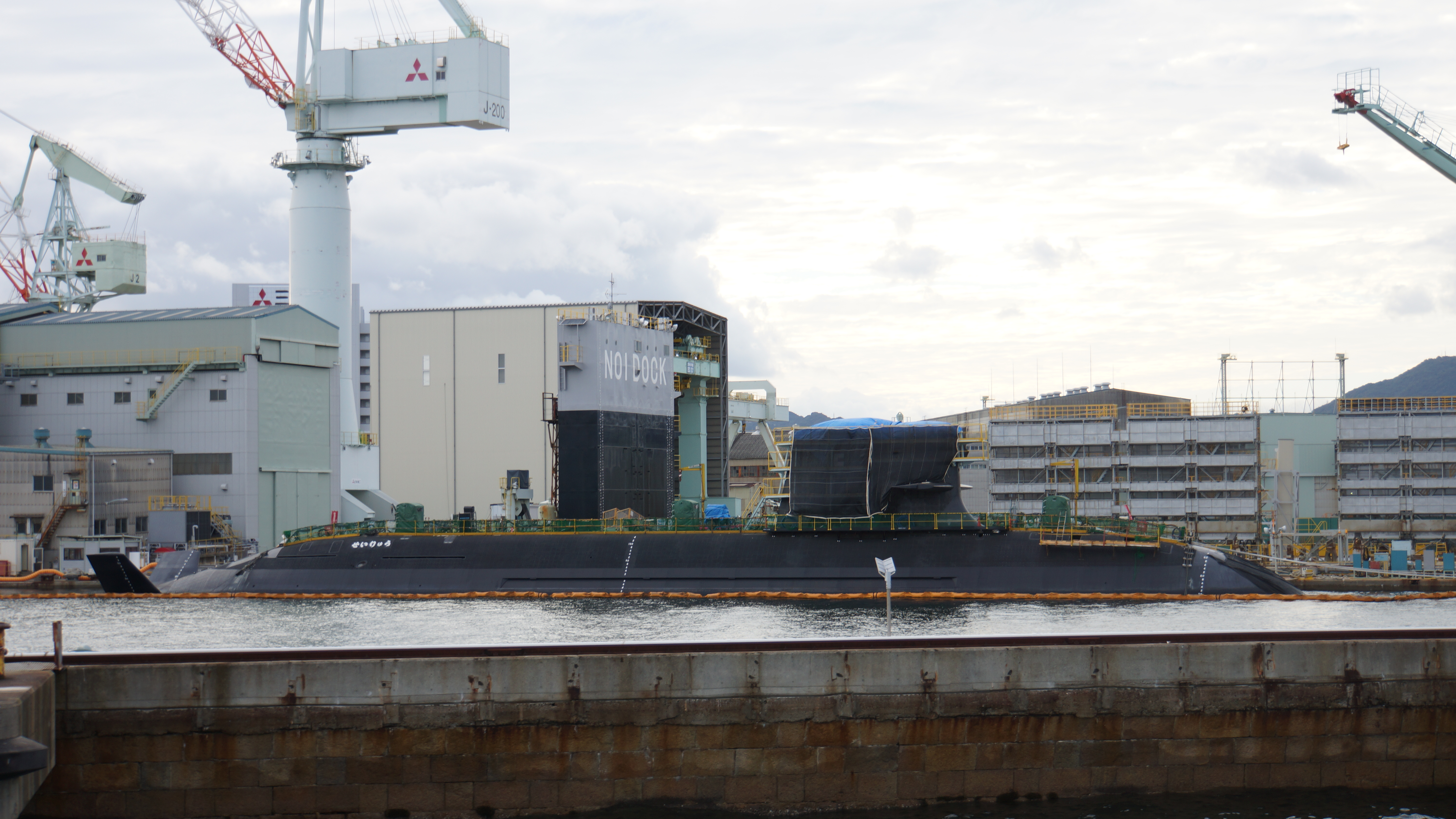
JS Seiryū at Kobe on 23 October 2016.
