= Attack-class submarine =

Canceled Australian submarine class

Class overview
- Builders: Naval Group
- Operators: Royal Australian Navy
- Preceded by: Collins class
- Succeeded by: SSN-AUKUS class
- Cost: A$89.7 billion (2020) for twelve units + TOT (est.)
- Planned: 12
- Cancelled: 12

General characteristics
- Type: Diesel-electric attack submarine
- Displacement: 4,500 t surfaced
- Length: 97 m (318 ft 3 in)
- Beam: 8.8 m (28 ft 10 in)
- Installed power: Diesel electric with lead acid batteries
- Propulsion: Pump-jet
- Speed: In excess of 20 knots (37 km/h; 23 mph)
- Range: 18,000 nmi (33,000 km; 21,000 mi) at 10 kn (19 km/h; 12 mph) surfaced
- Endurance: 80 days
- Complement: 60
- Sensors & processing systems: AN/BYG-1 combat system
- Armament: 8 × 533 mm (21 in) torpedo tubes; 28 torpedoes: Mark 48 MOD 7 heavyweight torpedo, Harpoon anti-ship missiles or Mk III Stonefish mines

The Attack-class submarine was a planned class of French-designed submarines for the Royal Australian Navy (RAN), expected to enter service in the early 2030s with construction extending until 2050. The project, which would have replaced the Collins-class submarines, began in 2007 as the Future Submarine program. In 2020 it was estimated to cost A$90 billion and would have been the largest and most complex defence acquisition project in Australian history.

Australia's unique operating environment (including significant variations in ocean climate and conditions) and rejection of nuclear marine propulsion had led it to operate the Collins-class, the world's largest diesel-electric submarines, capable of transiting the long distances from HMAS Stirling to their deployment areas. In the early phases of the project, four design options were identified: purchase a military off-the-shelf (MOTS) design, modify a MOTS design for Australian conditions, design an evolution of the Collins class, or create a new design.

In 2009, the Australian Government's defence white paper announced that a new class of twelve submarines would be built. The selected design was to be built at the ASC Pty Ltd shipyard in South Australia, but, if a company other than ASC was selected to build the submarines, they would be granted access to the government-owned facility. Early plans suggested the first submarine would be completed before 2025. However, there were significant delays in the project and by the end of 2014, operational capabilities had still not been defined. In February 2015 the Abbott government announced a competitive evaluation process between competing Japanese, French, and German designs. On 26 April 2016, Prime Minister Malcolm Turnbull announced the Shortfin Barracuda, a conventionally-powered variant of the Barracuda-class nuclear submarine by French firm DCNS (now Naval Group), as the winner.

On 16 September 2021, Prime Minister Scott Morrison announced the cancellation of the contract with Naval Group and the creation of AUKUS, a trilateral security pact between the United States, the United Kingdom, and Australia, that will help Australia to acquire nuclear-powered submarines: the SSN-AUKUS, expected to enter service in the early 2040s.

== Background ==
Australian diesel-electric submarines operate in a wide range of geographic and oceanographic conditions, from the cold Southern Ocean to the tropics of the Coral, Arafura, and Timor Seas – requiring the submarines to handle significant variances in temperature, salinity, density, and climate. Australian submarines provide a deterrent towards military aggression against Australia by patrolling the waters of Australia and nearby nations; in addition, they gather intelligence through the interception of electronic communications by foreign nations and assist in the deployment and retrieval of special forces operatives. Because RAN submarines operate from HMAS Stirling, Australian submarines have to transit long distances to reach some of their potential patrol areas. This requirement for range and endurance resulted in the 1980s Collins-class design incorporating a large fuel load, large engines and sufficient batteries to transit these long distances; technological improvements since then have enabled smaller diesel-electric submarines such as the German Type 214 submarine and Dutch Walrus-class submarine to achieve similar range and endurance as the Collins class. It has also been noted that the transit distances Australian submarines travel could be reduced by operating the submarines from HMAS Coonawarra in Darwin, rather than HMAS Stirling in Western Australia.

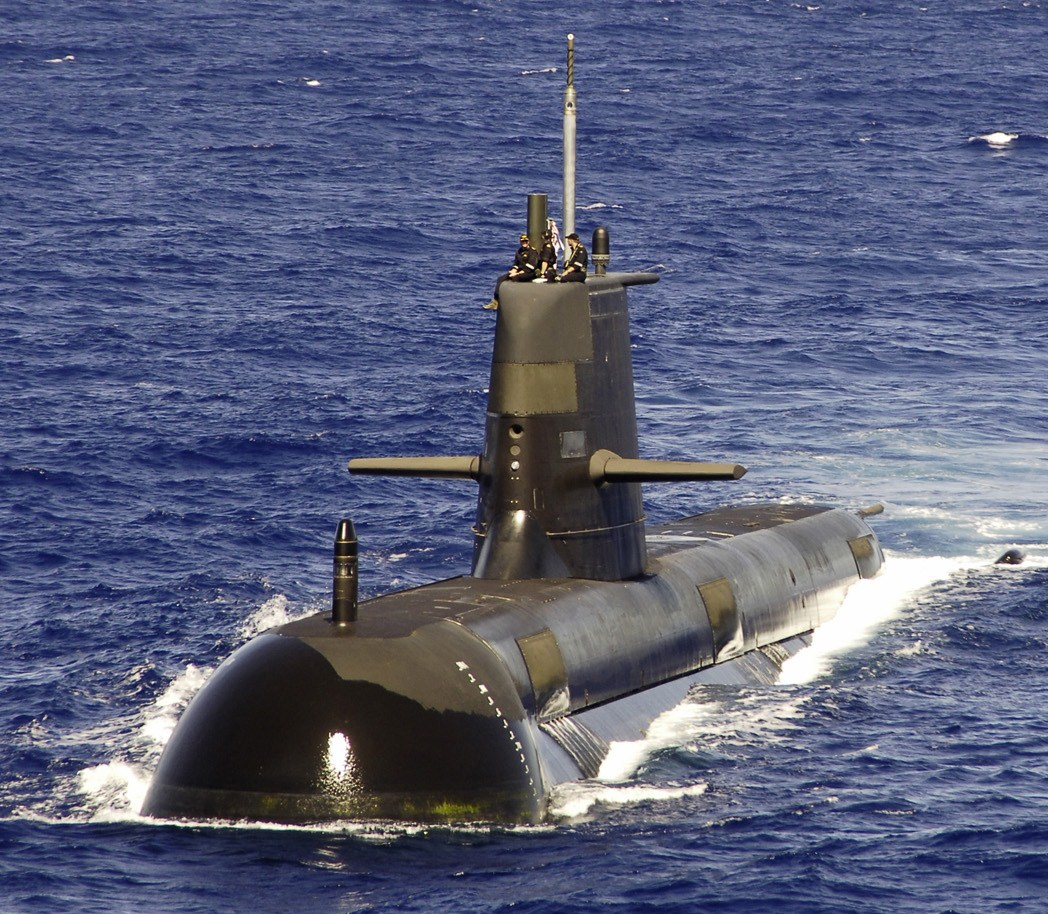
The Collins-class submarine HMAS Rankin. The SEA 1000 project was to replace the six Collins-class boats.

The Collins class were the first diesel-electric submarines specifically designed for Australian conditions of long transit distances and diverse sea states, and thus represent an 'orphan' design with no evolved design to replace them. The submarines were enlarged and heavily modified versions of Swedish shipbuilder Kockums' Västergötland class. Built during the 1990s and 2000s, the Collins-class submarines have a predicted operational life of around 30 years, with the lead boat HMAS Collins due to be decommissioned around 2025.

== Project history ==
The Submarine Institute of Australia released a report in July 2007 arguing that planning for the next generation of Australian submarines had to begin soon if they were to be replaced by the 2020s. In December 2007, a month after coming into office, Minister for Defence Joel Fitzgibbon announced that planning for the Collins-class replacement (designated SEA 1000) had commenced. The SEA 1000 project office was established within the Defence Materiel Organisation in October 2008, and was being jointly administered with Defence's Capability Development Group. In February 2009, Rear Admiral Rowan Moffitt was appointed as project head.

=== 2009 defence white paper ===
The 2009 Defending Australia in the Asia Pacific Century: Force 2030 white paper confirmed the replacement project, and announced that the submarine fleet would be increased to twelve vessels. Reasons for this included the growing quantity and sophistication of Asian-Pacific naval forces (particularly submarine forces), the need to sustain submarine operations in any conflict, and the greater deterrent an increased submarine force would provide.

Originally, the planned timeline called for concept work to start in 2009, preliminary designs to be established between 2011 and 2013, then detailed design work completed in time for construction to start in 2016. This was to ensure that the new class would be in service before the Collins class began decommissioning in 2025. However, meetings between Moffitt and the National Security Committee to clarify concept details and intended capabilities scheduled for November 2009 did not go ahead until March 2012. On 3 May 2012, the Australian government announced funding for the initial design phase. The initial phase would encompass studies to select the new submarines' design, Defence Science and Technology Organisation projects to establish parameters for propulsion, combat system, and stealth capabilities, along with initiating programs to develop the required industry skills for the actual construction. Under the 2012 revised timeline, the preliminary phase would conclude in 2013, with 'first pass approval' to be done by early 2014, and 'second pass approval' in 2017. The best case prediction for seeing the first new submarine enter service, made in 2012, was "after 2030". Some of the slow pace and lack of decision making has been attributed to politicians fearing being held responsible for a repeat of the problems experienced by the Collins class during their construction and early career.

In September 2013, Rear Admiral Greg Sammut AO was appointed as Head Future Submarine Program.

=== Speculation of a Sōryū class decision ===
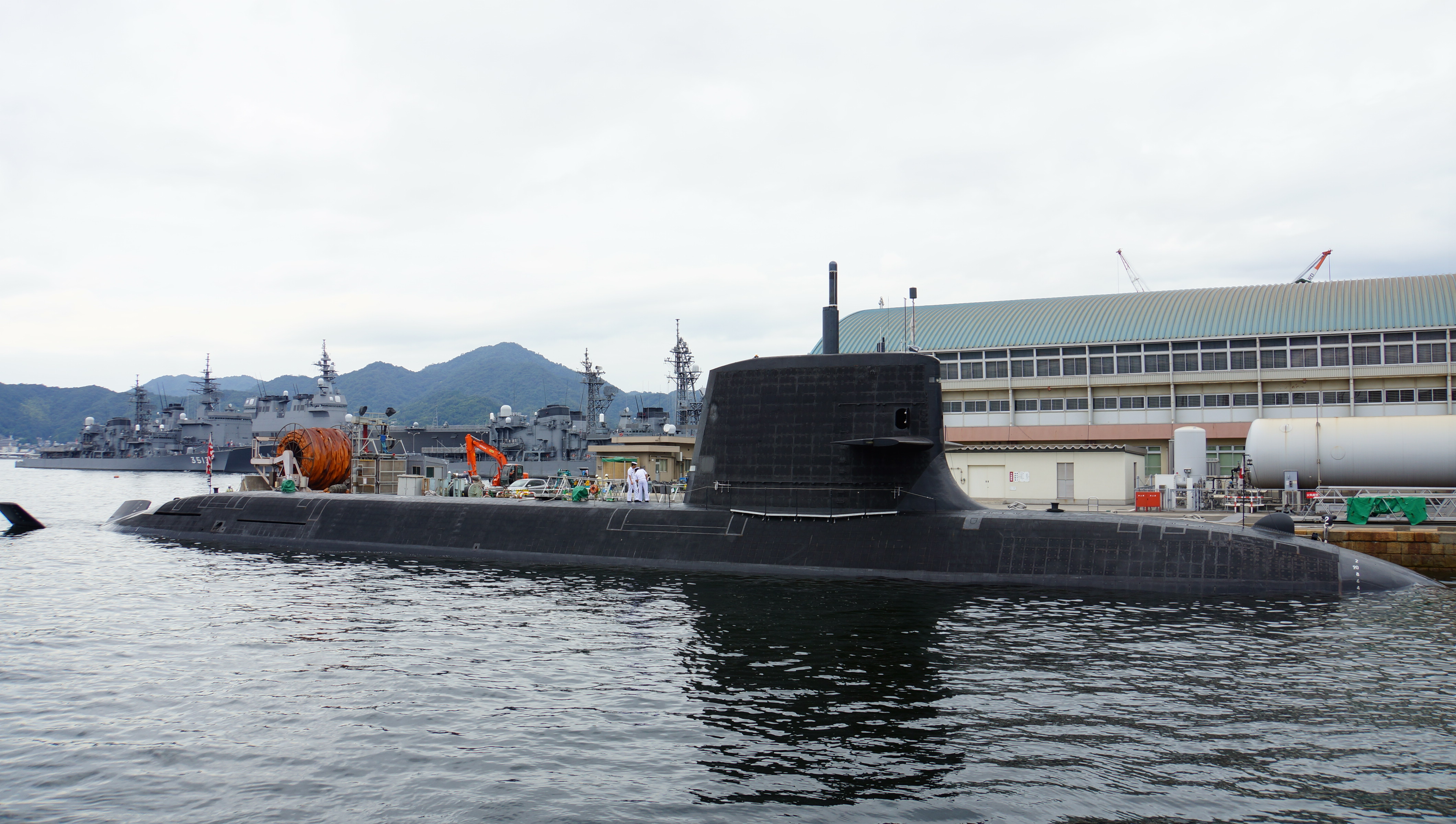
The Sōryū-class submarine Unryū in 2014. The Japanese submarines had been widely speculated as the forerunner for the replacement project.

Although the German Type 214 submarine has comparable range and endurance to the Collins class, and superior range and endurance compared to the Sōryū class, throughout 2014 there was increasing speculation that a Japanese design had been pre-selected as the Collins-class replacement, leading to criticism that the Japanese submarines did not have the range or endurance that Australia required.

A September 2012 weapons technology swap deal and a July 2014 agreement on the sharing of defence technology were seen as preliminary steps towards Australian-Japanese collaboration on a submarine design, or towards integrating technologies like the Sōryū's Kockums-designed air-independent propulsion Stirling engines and research into incorporating the Japanese boats' hydrodynamic capabilities into a potential SEA 1000 design. Advantages in such a deal between the nations include the attention that securing the SEA 1000 project would bring to Japanese arms manufacturers (particularly after loosening of defence export restrictions in 2014), the provision of a proven high-end submarine design to the Australian military, and improved relations, both directly and as mutual allies of the United States of America. However, it has been noted that cooperation on such a major defence project would be high risk due to Japan's lack of previous arms export experience, and any deal could negatively impact on both nations' relations with China. The close personal relationship between the then-Australian Prime Minister Tony Abbott and Japanese Prime Minister Shinzō Abe was also cited as a factor in the likeliness of such a deal, although with the caveat that a change in government in either nation would compromise any potential deal for construction, or the ongoing maintenance support of the submarines: the Australian Labor Party has a greater interest in supporting local shipbuilding than Abbott's Coalition government, while a souring of China-Japan relations is something the Democratic Party of Japan is less likely to risk than the Liberal Democratic government led by Abe.

By November 2014, initial capabilities had not been decided on, and recommendations were to be made throughout 2015. In December 2014, the Australian Coalition government ruled out using a tender process to identify a new submarine design, blaming the limited time left before the Collins class were scheduled to begin leaving service. Although there was speculation at the time that the Australian government would purchase directly from Japanese shipbuilders, in January 2015, Defence Minister Kevin Andrews stated that the government was still considering the options offered by European shipbuilders: ThyssenKrupp Marine Systems of Germany, Saab of Sweden, and a partnership of the French companies Thales and DCNS.

In mid-December 2015, the Japanese Maritime Self Defence Force allowed a journalist from the Australian Broadcasting Corporation (ABC) to tour the newest of the class, Kokuryū, at its base at Yokoska and speak to the commanding officer, Commander Takehiko Hirama, and several other personnel.

=== 2015 policy announcements ===
On 8 February 2015 the Abbott government signalled that both the selection of a design and selection of construction options would be competitive, and on 9 February 2015 announced a "competitive evaluation process" with the possibility of construction in Australia. On 20 February 2015 the Australian Government announced three key strategic considerations that would be taken into account in the competitive evaluation process: that the future submarines would have a similar range and endurance to the Collins class, superior sensor performance and stealth compared to the Collins class, and that the combat system and Mark 48 Mod 7 torpedo jointly developed between the United States and Australia would be the future submarines' preferred combat system and main weapon. The government also announced a three-way competition between ThyssenKrupp, the Thales-DCNS partnership and a Japanese design, while Saab was excluded.

== Technical considerations ==
=== Propulsion ===
Deciding the future submarines' propulsion system is closely tied to determining its operational range, underwater endurance, and stealthiness. Two basic options are presented in submarine propulsion: nuclear propulsion, and conventional, diesel-electric propulsion. The option of nuclear propulsion effectively gives submarines an unlimited range and endurance, only restrained by maintenance and human crew requirements for resupply and rest. It also removes the necessity for surfacing to recharge batteries, an unstealthy and risky process. Australian governments have repeatedly rejected the nuclear propulsion option due to the lack of an Australian nuclear power industry (Australia would be the only non-nuclear nation to operate nuclear submarines), related issues of operational sovereignty were Australia to operate an American nuclear-powered submarine such as the Virginia class, rendering it dependent on American technical support, and public opposition to nuclear technology.

The second alternative is to operate a conventional diesel-electric submarine with sufficient fuel and battery power to transit the large operational ranges required by Australia, and to provide maximum range, endurance and stealth (operating underwater), before having to resurface to snorkel and recharge batteries. Previously, this design brief led to the construction of a relatively large conventionally powered submarine, the Collins class, possessing a large diesel electric engine, fuel load and sufficient batteries capable of transporting the submarines to their operational areas, without having to resurface for extended periods.

A further innovation in diesel electric propulsion which might have been considered for the Collins-class replacement was air independent propulsion which is used in a number of modern submarine designs including the German Type 214, Japanese Sōryū class, and French Scorpène class. Air independent propulsion performs the role of an auxiliary engine, providing submarines with increased stealth by allowing them to operate submerged for longer. The German Type 214 submarine employs advanced polymer electrolyte membrane fuel cells that assist in delivering it comparable range and endurance to the Collins class.

=== Batteries ===
Batteries are an important component of diesel-electric submarines, propelling them and operating electric equipment underwater for long periods before having to surface to recharge the batteries. Improvements in battery technology in the 21st century have allowed smaller diesel-electric submarines to operate with greatly improved range and endurance. Lithium-ion battery technology was being planned for submarines by Japan in 2014. The Collins-class replacement may have operated battery technology superior to that of the existing Collins class.

The Australian Government's announcement on 20 February 2015 that the future submarines would have a similar range and endurance to the Collins class increased the likelihood that an evolved MOTS or completely new design would be selected.

=== Weapons capabilities ===
The 2009 defence white paper identified a land strike capability as an important addition to torpedo, mine and anti-ship missile weapons. In February 2015 the Australian Government identified its preference for the future submarines to have a US weapon system and heavyweight torpedo.

- Torpedo
- Mine
- Anti-ship missile
- Land attack cruise missile

== Design ==
=== Candidates ===
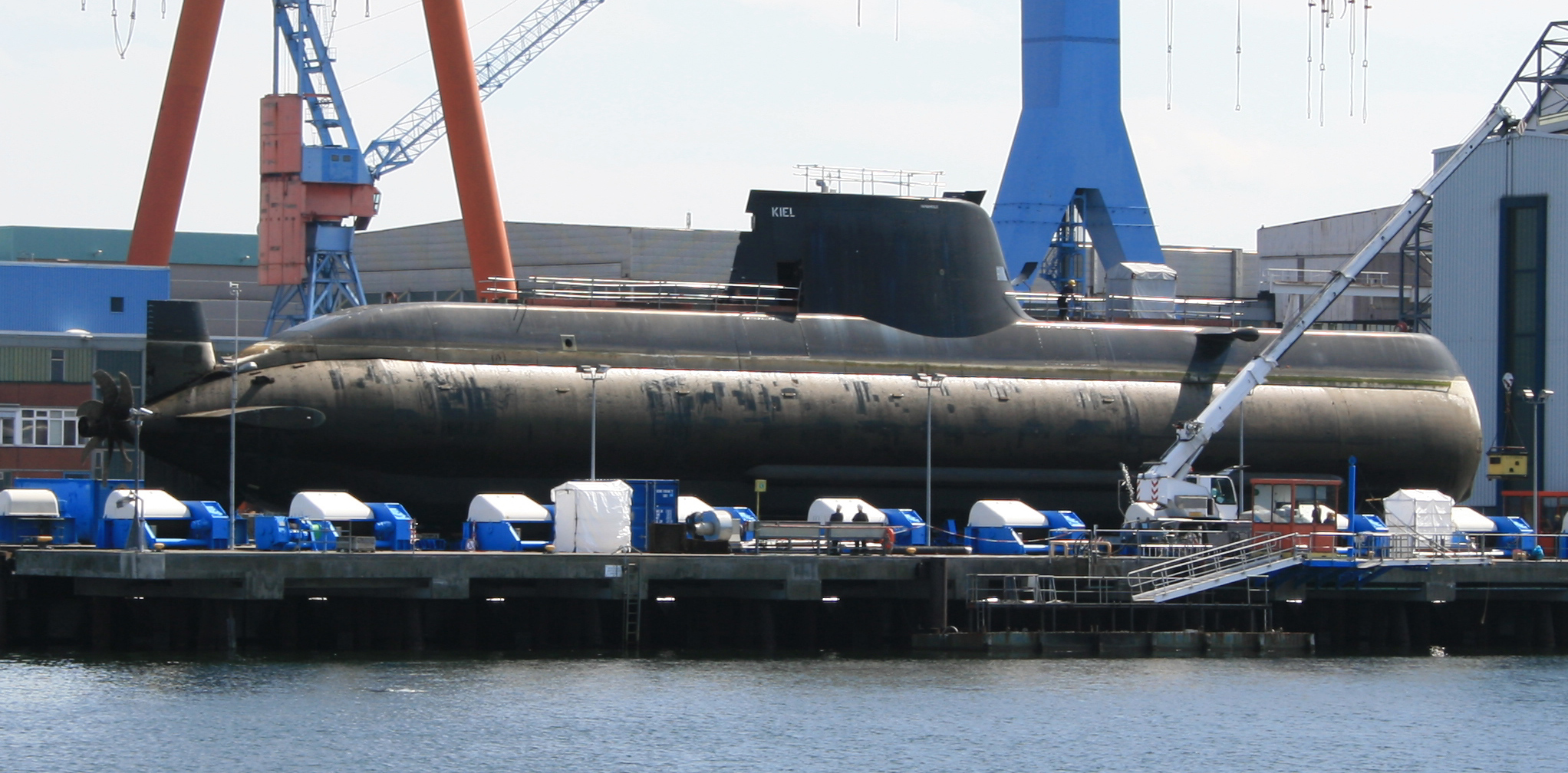
A German designed Type 214 submarine at the HDW building yard in Kiel, 2008. An evolved Type 214 was one of the options under consideration for the replacement program.

In the 2009 Defence white paper, the replacement submarines were outlined as a class of twelve vessels of up to 4,000 tons displacement, fitted with land-attack cruise missiles in addition to torpedoes and anti-ship missiles, capable of launching and recovering covert operatives while submerged, and carrying surveillance and intelligence-gathering equipment. The submarines would likely be fitted with the United States AN/BYG-1 combat system.

There were four possible routes for the SEA 1000 project to take, in order of increasing design complexity and risk:

- Buy a Military-Off-The-Shelf (MOTS) design without modification
- Develop a modified MOTS design to better suit Australian service conditions
- Design an evolution of the Collins class
- Design an entirely new submarine

Designs initially considered for the various MOTS routes included the German-designed Type 214, Japan's Sōryū class, the French-designed Scorpène class, the Spanish S-80 class, and an evolved Collins class. An evolved Collins-class design was also considered in 2013 but was officially dropped from consideration in 2015, due to it being assessed that the work required equated to a brand new design. In addition, Saab pushed an enlarged variant of its Swedish A26 submarine, but was excluded from further consideration in February 2015 due to Sweden having not designed and built a submarine independently for twenty years. Pure MOTS submarines were initially ruled out by the project in March 2011, but were put back on the table in December 2011.

Evolved designs of the Scorpène class were offered, while ThyssenKrupp Marine Systems, in additions to options for an evolved Type 214, proposed the development of a brand new design, the Type 216, to specifically match Australian requirements.

=== Selected: Shortfin Barracuda (France; DCNS) ===
On 30 November 2015, DCNS with Thales delivered its proposal for the Shortfin Barracuda Block 1A design (a diesel-electric variant of the Barracuda-class nuclear submarine under construction for the French Navy) to the Australia's Department of Defence. It includes a Government to Government Agreement from the Ministry of the Armed Forces's Direction générale de l'armement (DGA) with a binding written agreement for aspects of the deliverables.

DCNS was chosen by the Australian Government on 26 April 2016 to build 12 of the Shortfin Barracuda Block 1A variant at a projected A$50 billion. Much of the works were to be undertaken in Adelaide, South Australia.

According to the Royal Australian Navy the Shortfin Barracuda would displace 4,500 tons (surfaced), measure 97 m (318 ft) in length, have an 8.8 m (29 ft) beam, use pump-jet propulsion, have a range of 18,000 nautical miles, a top speed of greater than 20 knots (37 km/h; 23 mph), an endurance of 80 days and a crew of 60.

== Construction ==
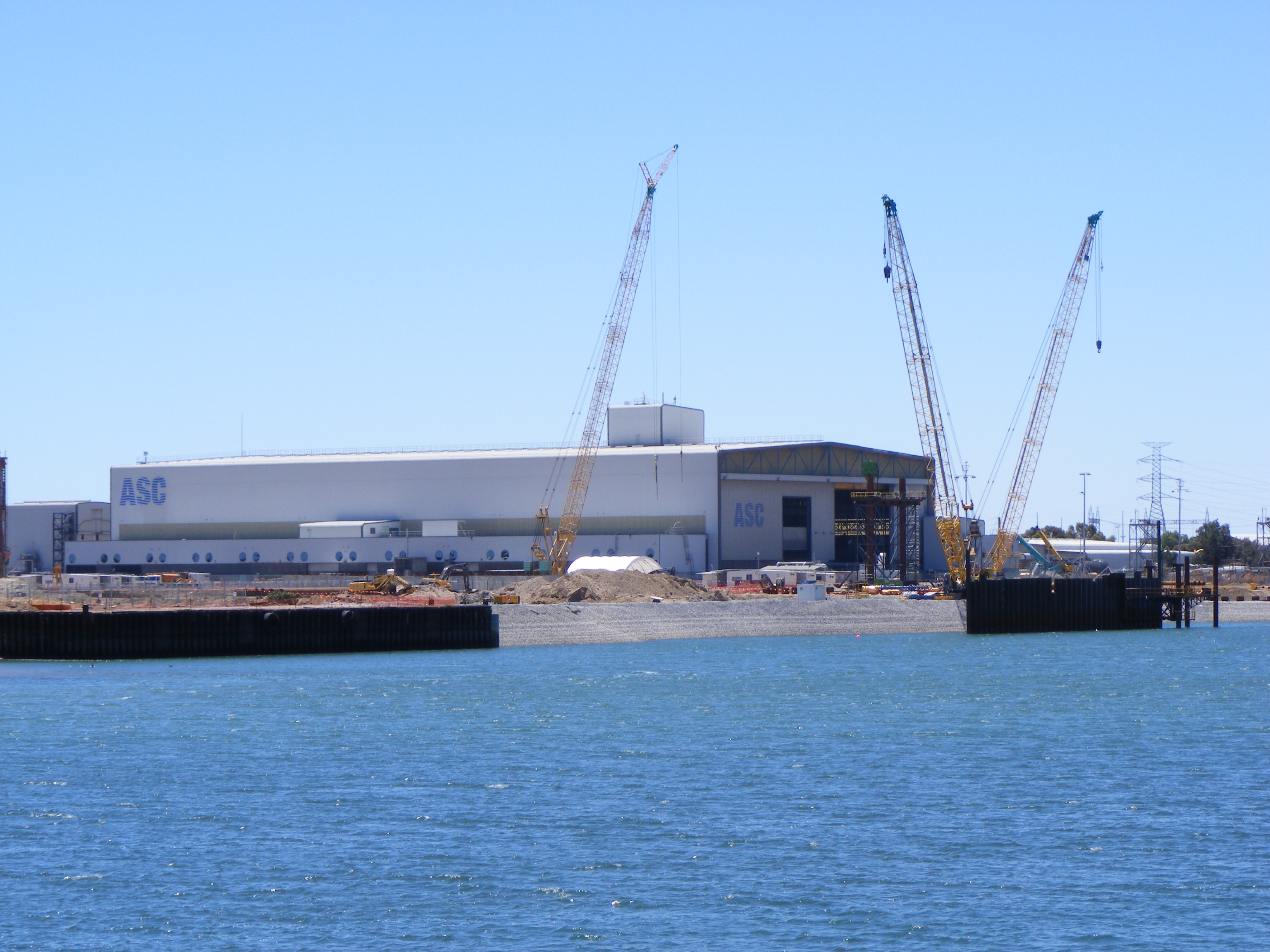
The ASC shipyard in Osborne, South Australia. The original intention was to build the new submarines at this government-owned shipyard, even if ASC was not the successful tenderer.

Initially, the Australian government promised that the government-owned ASC, the company responsible for building the Collins class, would build the new submarines. In a May 2009 announcement about plans to release a request for tender, the Labor government indicated that if a company other than ASC was the successful tenderer, that company would be granted access to ASC's shipyard in Osborne, South Australia. Despite ongoing support for the submarines to be built in South Australia by successive Coalition and Labor governments, in July 2014, the Abbott-led Coalition government abandoned their pre-election commitment to ASC-based construction and opened up the possibility of building the submarines at a foreign shipyard. In February 2015 the Abbott government in announcing a 'competitive evaluation process' noted that the government would not approach the submarine decision with an 'open cheque book', but would rather allow a competitive process in which various construction options would be explored, including construction in Australia, overseas, or a 'hybrid approach' of foreign and local construction, along with estimated costs and schedules.

Original plans for construction indicated a 25-year period from work starting to final completion. Because of the lengthy construction period, building the submarines in evolving 'batches' was under consideration; ongoing research and innovation would see updated equipment and designs incorporated into new submarines as built, then added to existing submarines during refits. As of 2021, construction of the submarines was scheduled to begin in 2023. The SEA 1000 submarines were predicted to remain in service until the 2070s.

In July 2017, Malcolm Turnbull opened the Future Submarine Project office in Cherbourg.

The class was named the Attack class in December 2018, with the first of class to have been designated HMAS Attack.

== Cost ==
When announced, the Collins replacement project was identified as the most expensive ever undertaken by the Australian Defence Force. In December 2010, an update to the 2009 Defence Capability Plan forecast the cost of the project as over A$10 billion. However, the Australian Strategic Policy Institute has predicted that the new submarines would cost over A$36 billion to design and build, with construction of each submarine valued between A$1.4 and A$3.04 billion. Government predictions in 2014 estimated a total cost of up to A$80 billion for 12 Collins derivatives built by ASC, although ASC contested this with claims of a cost of A$18–24 billion.

An unspecified number of Sōryū-class submarines, built in Japan by Mitsubishi Heavy Industries and Kawasaki Shipbuilding Corporation was estimated at A$25 billion. European shipbuilder offers in 2014 were valued by the shipbuilders as costing around $A20 billion or otherwise being competitive with the Japanese valuation.

In 2020 the Department of Finance indicated that the real cost would be in excess of $80 billion, which had been known as early as October 2015.

From the original €35 billion cost, only €8 billion would go to French companies.

== Submarines in class ==
Estimated dates in Italics

Name	Pennant	Builder	Laid down	Launched	Delivered	Commissioned	Status	Namesake
Batch 1
Attack		Naval Group Australia and ASC Pty Ltd, Osborne	Projected 2023		2030s	2030s	Cancelled	To act against aggressively with armed force. She would have been the second vessel in the RAN named "Attack".

== Cancellation ==
On 16 September 2021, Australia cancelled the contract with Naval Group. Less than three weeks earlier, on 30 August, the French and Australian defence and foreign affairs ministers had released a joint statement reaffirming the project, stating that the "Ministers underlined the importance of the Future Submarine program." Prime Minister Scott Morrison said that Australia now required a nuclear-powered submarine which has the advantages of greater speed, remaining underwater for longer and carrying heavier loads than a conventionally powered submarine, based on a change in the strategic situation in the Indo-Pacific and that the Attack class would have been "the most capable and lethal conventional submarine ever built."

Australia had invested A$2.4 billion into the program. The strategic partnership agreement contained "control gates" with "off-ramps" at which point Australia could withdraw from the contract. The program had been intensively criticised in Australia because of its alleged increase in costs and failure to place most of the work in Australia.

Morrison said when announcing the contract cancellation that Australia had "advised Naval Group and of course, the Government of France and President Macron of that decision". He later said that he had tried to call the President hours before the announcement.

=== AUKUS ===
The Telegraph reported that in March 2021 the Australian navy chief Vice Admiral Michael Noonan met in London with his British counterpart Admiral Tony Radakin and requested assistance from the UK and the US in acquiring nuclear-powered submarines. A trilateral discussion was held between British prime minister Boris Johnson, US president Joe Biden and Morrison at the June 2021 G7 summit in Cornwall, England. The talks took place without Macron's knowledge. On the day the contract was cancelled, Morrison, Johnson and Biden jointly announced the creation of the AUKUS trilateral security pact. Morrison separately announced the contract cancellation.

Under the AUKUS pact, the US and UK will share nuclear propulsion technology with Australia, as they have with each other since 1958 under the 1958 US–UK Mutual Defence Agreement. Australia will now acquire at least eight nuclear-powered submarines armed with conventional weapons. The submarines will be built by ASC in Osborne. The basic design and key technologies will be decided by the Nuclear-Powered Submarine Task Force, an 18-month Department of Defence research project headed by Vice Admiral Jonathan Mead, begun in September 2021 with assistance from the US and UK.

Australia considered purchasing French nuclear submarines which use nuclear reactors fuelled by low-enriched uranium (LEU) at less than 6% enrichment. However, French reactor designs have to be refuelled every ten years, and Australia does not have a civil nuclear capability with nuclear energy prohibited. In contrast, American and British designs power the submarines for the expected life of the submarines using nuclear reactors fuelled by highly enriched uranium (HEU) at 93% enrichment.

=== Reaction ===
Naval Group said that Australia had "terminated the contract for convenience". The French Ministry of Defense claimed that on the day that the contract was cancelled, Australia had written to France stating that "they were satisfied with the submarine's achievable performance and with the progress of the program." The French foreign minister Jean-Yves Le Drian said that Australia told France one hour before the public announcement of the cancellation. He called the decision to cancel the contract and the secret AUKUS negotiations a "stab in the back". He said in regards to NATO alliance partners the US and the UK that "In a real alliance you talk to each other, you don't hide things, you respect the other party." Christian Cambon, chairman of the Committee of the French Senate's Foreign Affairs, Defence and Armed Forces, said the decision to cancel the contract must lead France "to wonder about the recurrent attitude from some of our allies, behaving as adversaries rather than fair competitors". On 17 September 2021, Le Drian announced that President Macron had recalled the French ambassadors to Australia and the United States.

=== Settlement ===
On 11 June 2022, Australia's newly elected Labor-led government agreed a €555 million ($583.58 million) settlement with Naval Group. French defense minister Sébastien Lecornu welcomed the settlement and stated that France was willing to rebuild its relationship with Australia. In addition, the Australian Prime Minister Anthony Albanese announced plans to travel to France to repair bilateral relations between the two countries.

== See also ==
- Dolphin-class submarine
- Orka-class submarine
