= Sōryū-class submarine =

JMSDF submarine

- Soryu-class profile

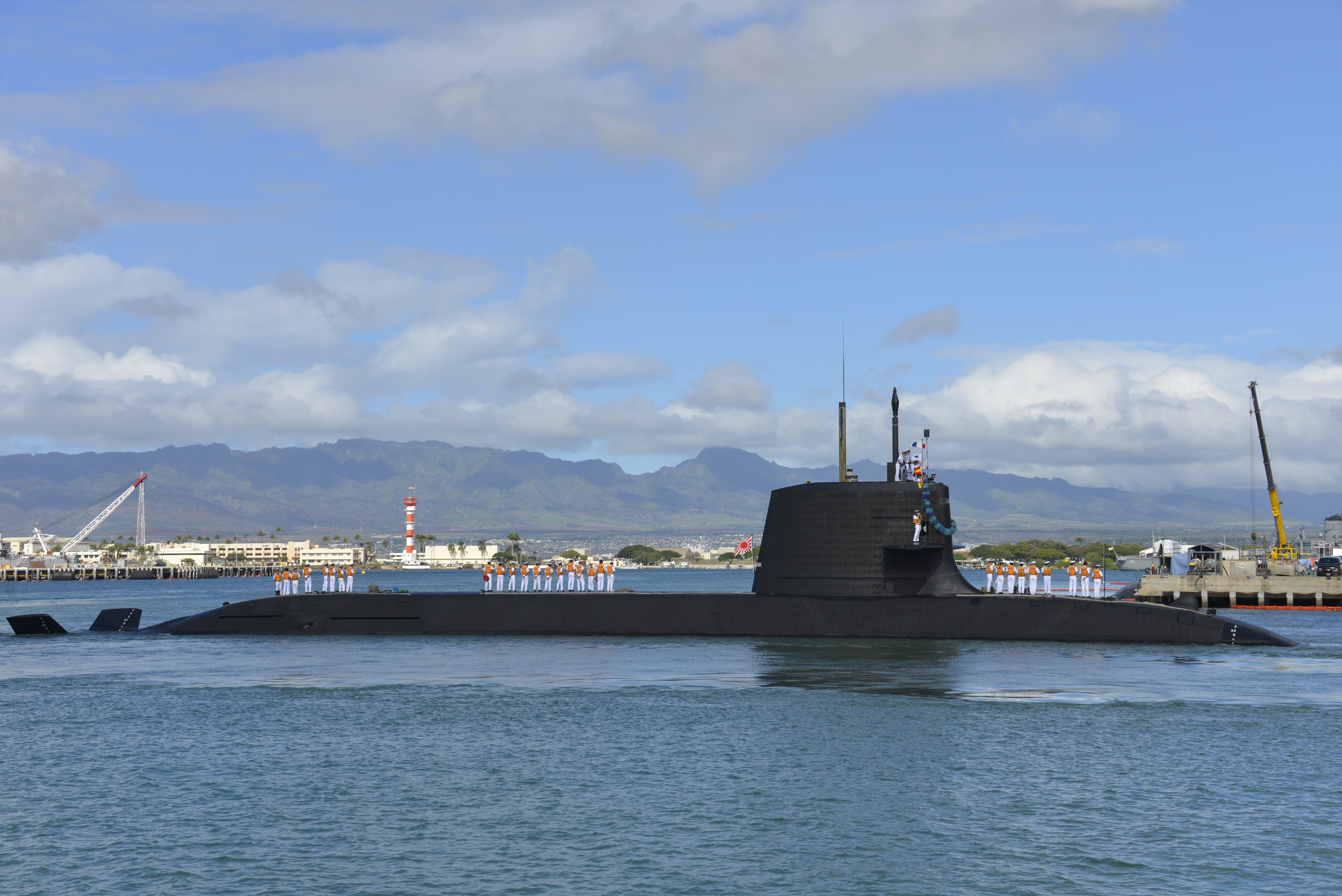
- Hakuryū (SS-503) visits Pearl Harbor, Feb 2013

Class overview
- Name: Sōryū
- Builders: Mitsubishi Heavy Industries; Kawasaki Shipbuilding Corporation
- Operators: Japan Maritime Self-Defense Force
- Preceded by: Oyashio-class submarine
- Succeeded by: Taigei-class submarine
- Built: 2005 – 2019
- In commission: 2009 – Present
- Planned: 12
- Completed: 12
- Active: 12

General characteristics
- Type: Attack submarine
- Displacement: Surfaced: 2,900 tonnes (2,854 long tons); Submerged: 4,200 t (4,134 long tons)
- Length: 84.0 m (275 ft 7 in)
- Beam: 9.1 m (29 ft 10 in)
- Draught: 8.5 m (27 ft 11 in)
- Propulsion: 1-shaft 2× Kawasaki 12V 25/25 SB-type diesel engines diesel-electric; 4× Kawasaki Kockums V4-275R Stirling engines - up to Shōryū; 3,900 hp (2,900 kW) surfaced; 8,000 hp (6,000 kW) submerged
- Speed: Surfaced: 13 kn (24 km/h; 15 mph); Submerged: 20 kn (37 km/h; 23 mph)
- Range: AIP endurance (est.): 6,100 nautical miles (11,300 km; 7,000 mi) at 6.5 knots (12.0 km/h; 7.5 mph)
- Complement: 65 (9 officers, 56 enlisted)
- Sensors & processing systems: ZPS-6F surface/low-level air search radar; Hughes/Oki ZQQ-7 Sonar suite: 1× bow-array, 4× LF flank arrays and 1× Towed array sonar
- Electronic warfare & decoys: ZLR-3-6 ESM equipment; 2× 3-inch underwater countermeasure launcher tubes for launching of Acoustic Device Countermeasures (ADCs)
- Armament: 6 × HU-606 21 in (533 mm) torpedo tubes with 30 reloads for: Type 89 torpedo; Harpoon (missile); Mines

The Sōryū-class submarines (16SS) are diesel-electric attack submarines. The first boat in the class entered service with the Japan Maritime Self-Defense Force (JMSDF) in 2009. The design is an evolution of the Oyashio class, from which it can most easily be distinguished by its X-shaped stern combination diving planes and rudders. At the time of launching, the Sōryūs had the largest displacement of any submarine used by post-war Japan.

The Sōryū class is Japan's first air-independent propulsion submarine class. From Sōryū to Shōryū are fitted with Kockums Naval Solutions Stirling engines license-built by Kawasaki Heavy Industries, allowing them to stay submerged for longer periods of time. The 11th submarine of the class, Ōryū, is the world's first lithium-ion battery submarine. The cost of the sixth submarine (Kokuryū) was estimated at US$540 million.

In 2023, the first of the replacements for the Sōryūs, the Taigei class, entered service.

== Naming convention ==
Japanese submarines since World War II were named after ocean currents. The JMSDF changed its naming convention with the Sōryū, and submarines will now be named after mythological creatures. Sōryū (そうりゅう) means blue dragon in Japanese and shares its name with the World War II aircraft carrier Sōryū, sunk during the Battle of Midway.

== Variants ==
The eleventh Sōryū-class submarine (Ōryū) is the first Japanese submarine in the fleet to mount lithium-ion batteries. The JS Ōryū was given a budget of ¥64.3 billion (equivalent to ¥71.35 billion or US$471.36 million in 2024) under the 2015 Japanese Defense Budget.

Lithium-ion batteries have almost twice the electric storage capacity of traditional lead-acid batteries. Updated Sōryū-class boats also added more batteries by placing them within hull spaces previously occupied by AIP system machinery. These upgraded boats benefited by increasing both the size and energy density of their battery storage. The change to lithium-ion improved the underwater endurance significantly and will be an advantage over the slow recharge capability of the AIP system.

In any event, JMSDF believes that lithium-ion is the way forward and intends to 'trial' this new system and compare it to the previous AIP system for operational effectiveness.

== Exports ==
Japan offered Sōryū-class submarines to Australia as replacements for the Royal Australian Navy's Collins-class submarines, as part of the Collins-class submarine replacement project. On 9 April 2014, then-Australian Minister for Defence, David Johnston, described the Sōryū class as "extremely impressive" while discussing Australia's future submarine options. On 26 April 2016, Australian Prime Minister Malcolm Turnbull announced that the Australian contract had been awarded to the French-designed Shortfin Barracuda, though this deal was eventually rescinded.

India, Morocco, Norway, Netherlands, and Taiwan have also approached Japan, and expressed an interest in buying Sōryū-class submarines. During a visit to Japan, India's then-Union Minister of Defence, Manohar Parrikar, invited the Japanese government to participate in their US$8.1 billion Project 75I-class submarine procurement program.

On July 7, 2025, it was reported that the Indonesian Navy was looking at potentially acquiring Sōryū-class submarines.

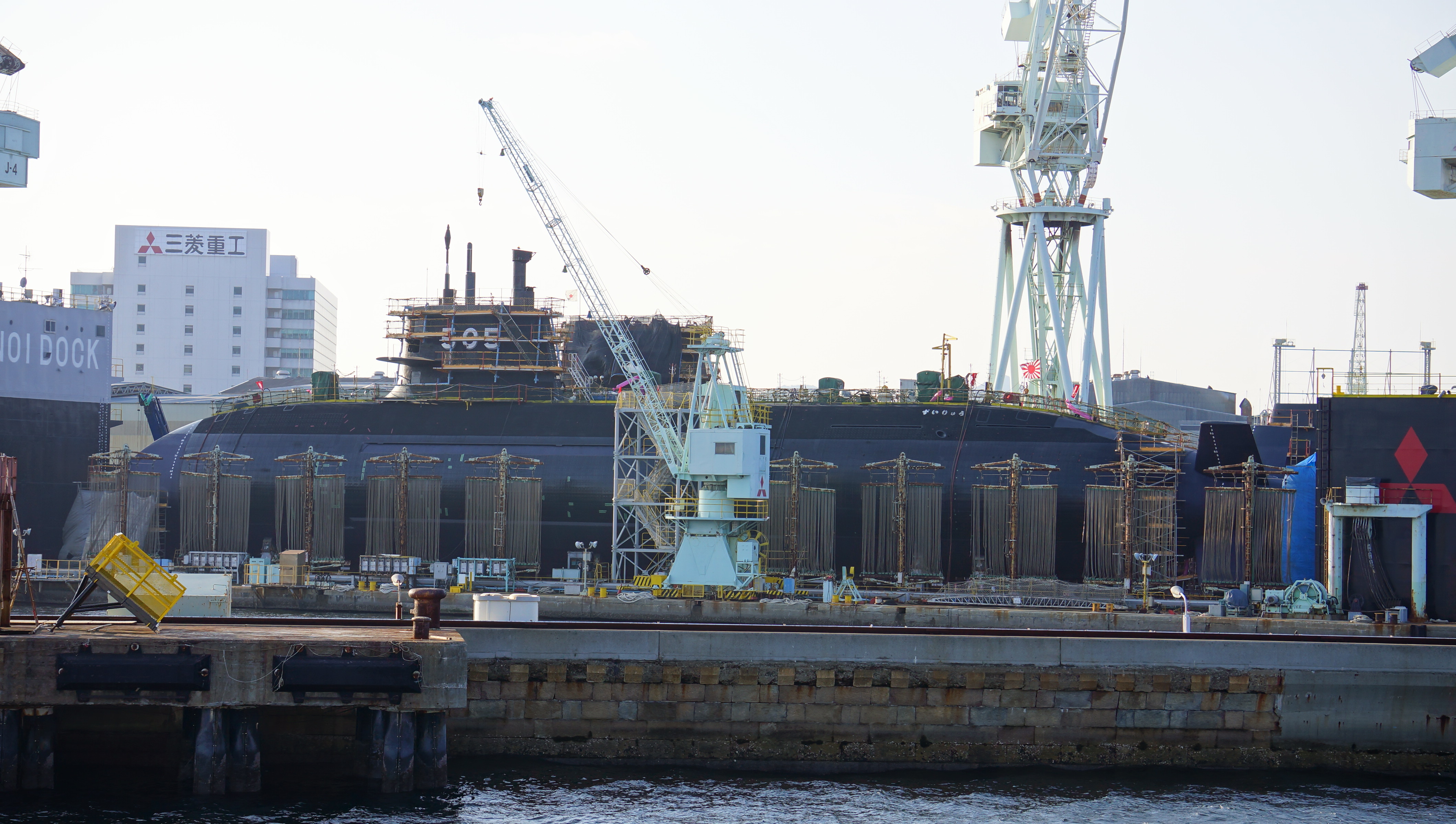
Zuiryū (SS-505) under construction

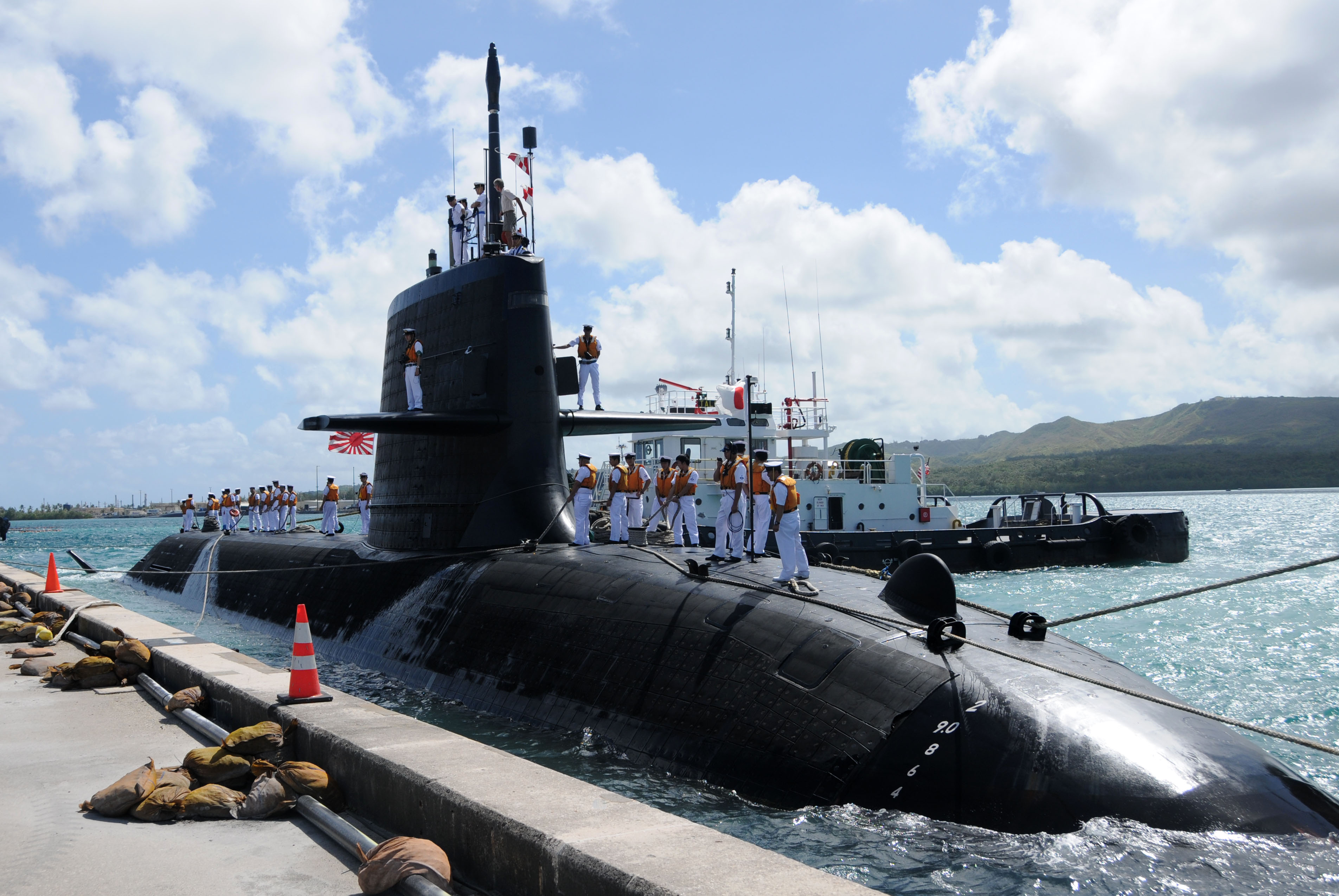
Hakuryū (SS-503) visiting Guam in 2013

== Boats ==
Project no.	Building no.	Pennant no.	Name	Japanese	Namesake	Laid down	Launched	Commissioned	Home port	Notes
S131	8116	SS-501	Sōryū	そうりゅう	Blue Dragon	31 March 2005	5 December 2007	30 March 2009	Kure	
S131	8117	SS-502	Unryū	うんりゅう	Cloud Dragon	31 March 2006	15 October 2008	25 March 2010	Kure	These five submarines are equipped with a new sonar ZQQ-7B.
S131	8118	SS-503	Hakuryū	はくりゅう	White Dragon	6 February 2007	16 October 2009	14 March 2011	Kure	These five submarines are equipped with a new sonar ZQQ-7B.
S131	8119	SS-504	Kenryū	けんりゅう	Sword Dragon	31 March 2008	15 November 2010	16 March 2012	Kure	These five submarines are equipped with a new sonar ZQQ-7B.
S131	8120	SS-505	Zuiryū	ずいりゅう	Auspicious Dragon	16 March 2009	20 October 2011	6 March 2013	Yokosuka	These five submarines are equipped with a new sonar ZQQ-7B.
S131	8121	SS-506	Kokuryū	こくりゅう	Black Dragon	21 January 2011	31 October 2013	9 March 2015	Yokosuka	These five submarines are equipped with a new sonar ZQQ-7B.
S131	8122	SS-507	Jinryū	じんりゅう	Benevolent Dragon	14 February 2012	8 October 2014	7 March 2016	Kure	This submarine is equipped with a new sonar ZQQ-7B and a new satellite communication device.
S131	8123	SS-508	Sekiryū	せきりゅう	Red Dragon	15 March 2013	2 November 2015	13 March 2017	Kure	These three submarines are equipped with a new sonar ZQQ-7B, a new satellite communication device and new torpedo counter measures.
S131	8124	SS-509	Seiryū	せいりゅう	Pure Dragon	22 October 2013	12 October 2016	12 March 2018	Yokosuka	These three submarines are equipped with a new sonar ZQQ-7B, a new satellite communication device and new torpedo counter measures.
S131	8125	SS-510	Shōryū	しょうりゅう	Soaring Dragon	28 January 2015	6 November 2017	18 March 2019	Kure	These three submarines are equipped with a new sonar ZQQ-7B, a new satellite communication device and new torpedo counter measures.
S131	8126	SS-511	Ōryū	おうりゅう	Phoenix Dragon	16 November 2015	4 October 2018	5 March 2020	Kure	These two submarines utilize Li-ion battery propulsion technology
S131	8127	SS-512	Tōryū	とうりゅう	Fighting Dragon	27 January 2017	6 November 2019	24 March 2021	Yokosuka	These two submarines utilize Li-ion battery propulsion technology

== See also ==
- List of submarine classes in service

Equivalent submarines of the same era

- Type 039B
- Project 636.3
- Dosan Ahn Changho class
