= G-class frigate =

Frigate class of the Turkish Navy

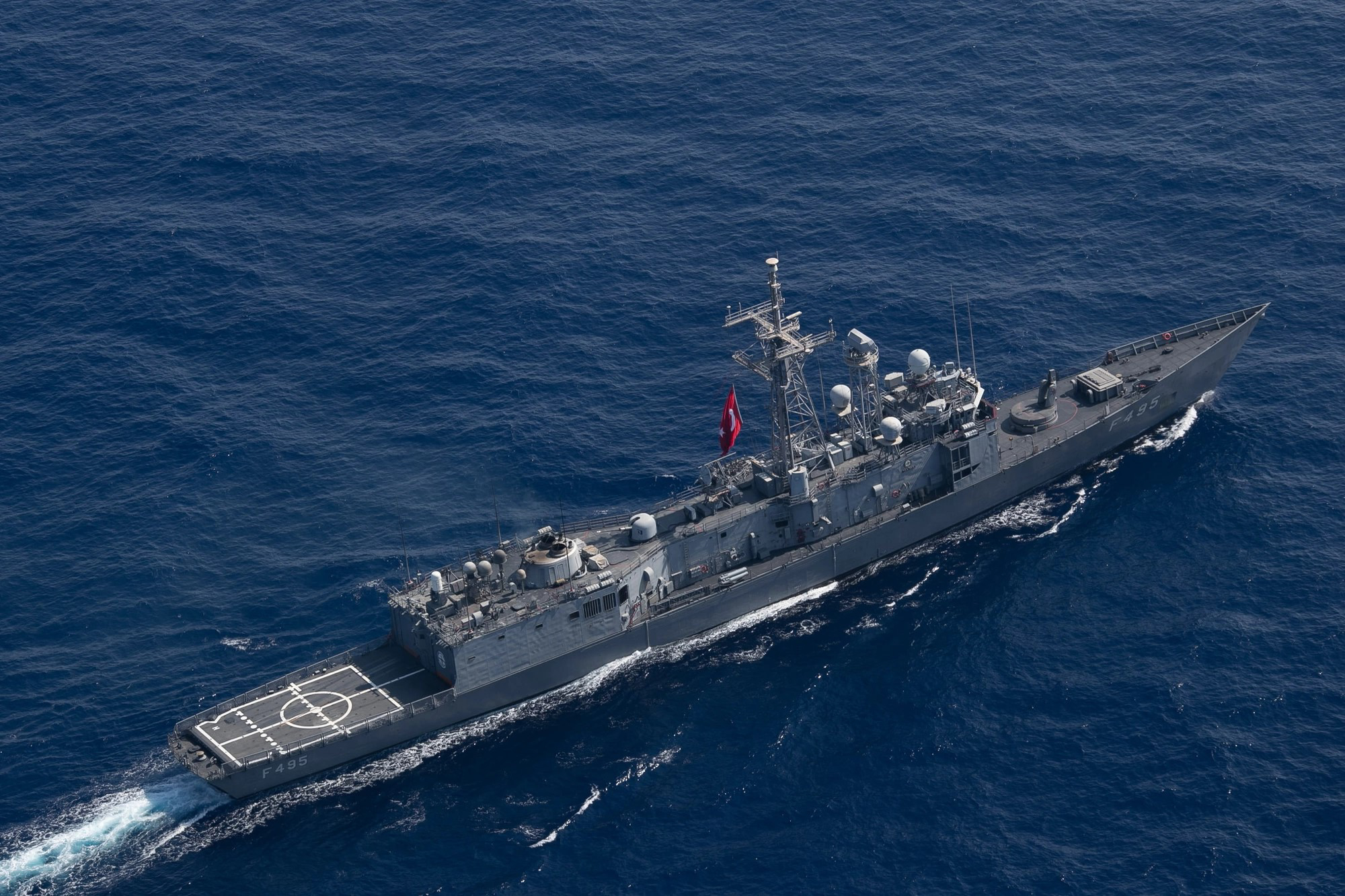
- TCG Göksu (F-497) in the Mediterranean Sea on 21 August 2023. The G-class frigates are equipped with the GENESIS combat management system, SMART-S Mk2 3D radar and Mk. 41 VLS, which has been installed in front of the Mk. 13 GMLS.

Class overview
- Name: G class
- Operators: Turkish Navy
- Succeeded by: Yavuz class
- Built: 1979–1981
- In commission: 1997–present
- Planned: 8
- Completed: 8
- Active: 8

General characteristics
- Type: Frigate
- Displacement: 4,100 long tons (4,166 t) full load
- Length: 135.6 m (444 ft 11 in)
- Beam: 13.7 m (44 ft 11 in)
- Draught: 6.7 m (22 ft 0 in)
- Propulsion: 2 × GE LM 2500 gas turbines, 41,000 hp (31 MW); 1 propeller and 2 × bow thrusters
- Speed: 30 knots (56 km/h; 35 mph)
- Range: 5,000 nmi (9,300 km) at 18 kn (33 km/h)
- Complement: 222 (19 officers, 203 men)
- Sensors & processing systems: Combat Management System: GENESIS (Gemi Entegre Savaş İdare Sistemi); Search radar: SMART-S Mk2
- Armament: 1 × Mk 15 Phalanx CIWS; 1 × Oto Melara 76mm DP gun; 8 × Harpoon SSM; 40 × SM-1 MR SAM; 32 × ESSM launched from Mk-41 VLS (4 ESSM missiles per MK-41 cell through the use of MK25 Quadpack canisters, total of 8 cells); Two triple Mark 32 Anti-submarine warfare torpedo tubes with Mark 46 or Mark 50 anti-submarine warfare torpedoes
- Aircraft carried: 1 × S-70B Seahawk or AB-212 (ASW/ASuW/EW)

The G class (Turkish: Gabya sınıfı fırkateyn(ler)) is one of the frigate classes of the Turkish Navy. They are extensively modernized versions of ex-Oliver Hazard Perry-class guided-missile frigates of the US Navy, mainly designed for air defense with a weapons configuration that is optimized for general warfare.

== Modernization ==
The G-class frigates have undergone a major modernization program which included the retrofitting of a Turkish digital combat management system named GENESIS (Gemi Entegre Savaş İdare Sistemi). The system was designed and implemented jointly by the Turkish Navy and HAVELSAN, a Turkish electronic hardware systems and software company. The first GENESIS upgraded ship was delivered in 2007, and the last delivery is scheduled for 2011.

The GENESIS advanced combat management system includes the following characteristics and abilities:

- A modern and reliable system
- High performance
- Open architecture
- Capacity of tracking more than 1,000 tactical targets
- Modern digital sensor data fusion
- Automatic threat evaluation
- Weapon engagement opportunities
- Link-16/22 system integration

The modernization program also includes:

- The addition of an 8-cell Mk-41 VLS for Evolved Sea Sparrow, including the upgrade of the Mk-92 fire control system by Lockheed Martin
- The retrofitting of a new advanced SMART-S Mk2 3D air search radar to replace AN/SPS-49
- The addition of a new long range sonar

The Mk-41 vertical launching system (VLS) has been fitted in front of the Mk.13 launcher, similar to their installation on the Adelaide-class frigates of the Royal Australian Navy, which are Australian-built derivatives of the Oliver Hazard Perry-class frigates. TCG Gediz became the first ship in the class to receive the Mk 41 VLS installation.

The "short hull" ex-Perry class frigates that are currently being operated by the Turkish Navy were modified with the ASIST landing platform system at the Istanbul Naval Shipyard, so that they can accommodate the S-70B Seahawk helicopter.

== Ships ==
- TCG Gaziantep (F 490) ex-USS Clifton Sprague (FFG-16)
- TCG Giresun (F 491) ex-USS Antrim (FFG-20)
- TCG Gemlik (F 492) ex-USS Flatley (FFG-21)
- TCG Gelibolu (F 493) ex-USS Reid (FFG-30)
- TCG Gökçeada (F 494) ex-USS Mahlon S. Tisdale (FFG-27)
- TCG Gediz (F 495) ex-USS John A. Moore (FFG-19)
- TCG Gökova (F 496) ex-USS Samuel Eliot Morison (FFG-13)
- TCG Göksu (F 497) ex-USS Estocin (FFG-15)

In addition, the ex-USS Duncan (FFG-10) was sold to the Turkish Navy as a parts hulk.

== See also ==
- List of major surface ships of the Turkish Navy
- List of frigate classes in service

Equivalent frigates of the same era

- Karel Doorman class
- Brandenburg class
- Anzac class
- Type 23
- Vasco da Gama class
- Neustrashimy class
- Halifax class
- Kang Ding class
