= USS Carr =

Oliver Hazard Perry-class frigate

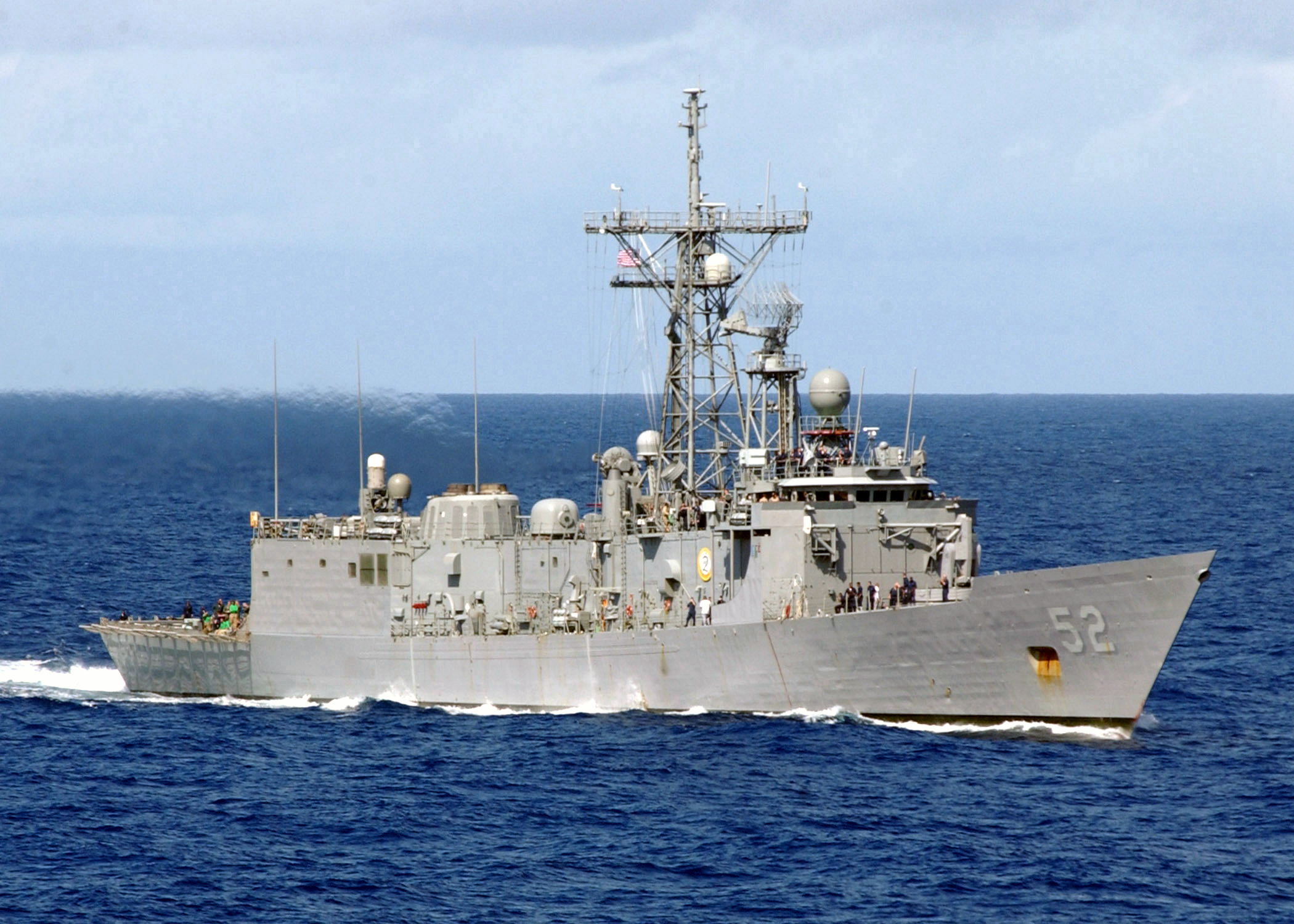
- USS Carr (FFG-52)

History

United States
- Name: Carr
- Namesake: Gunner's Mate Third Class Paul H. Carr
- Awarded: 22 May 1981
- Builder: Todd Pacific Shipyards, Seattle, Washington
- Laid down: 26 March 1982
- Launched: 26 February 1983
- Sponsored by: Goldie Carr Bensilhe
- Commissioned: 27 July 1985
- Decommissioned: 13 March 2013
- Identification: Hull symbol:FFG-52; Code letters:NCAR
- Motto: "Courage, Will, Determination"
- Nickname(s): "Carr-Toon"; "Carr-tel" (Unofficial)
- Status: Slated for sale to Taiwan by the Naval Vessel Transfer Act of 2013
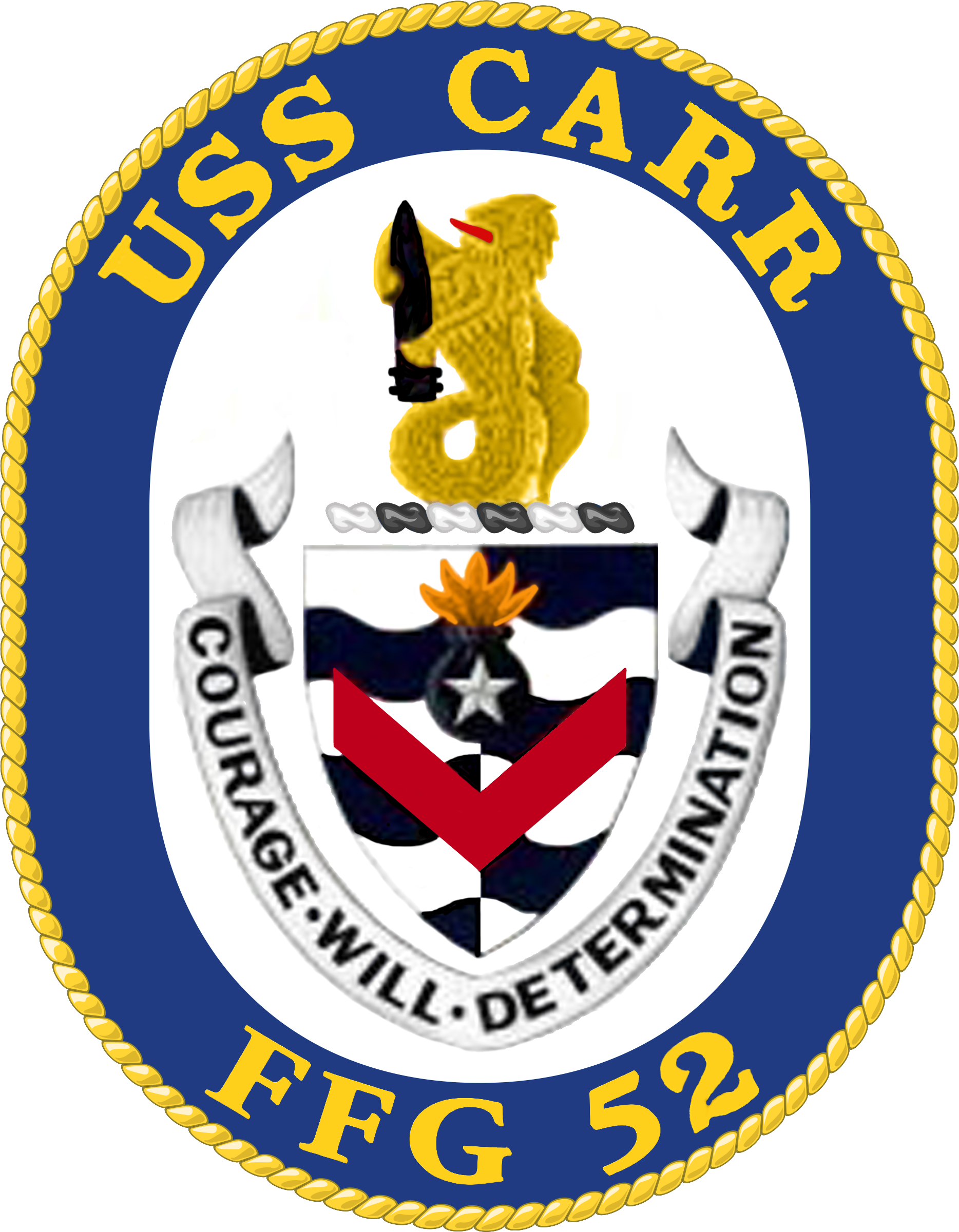
- Badge

General characteristics
- Class & type: Oliver Hazard Perry-class frigate
- Displacement: 4,100 long tons (4,200 t), full load
- Length: 453 feet (138 m), overall
- Beam: 45 feet (14 m)
- Draught: 22 feet (6.7 m)
- Propulsion: 2 × General Electric LM2500-30 gas turbines generating 41,000 shp (31 MW) through a single shaft and variable pitch propeller; 2 × Auxiliary Propulsion Units, 350 hp (260 kW) retractable electric azimuth thrusters for maneuvering and docking.
- Speed: over 29 knots (54 km/h)
- Range: 5,000 nautical miles at 18 knots (9,300 km at 33 km/h)
- Complement: 15 officers and 190 enlisted, plus SH-60 LAMPS detachment of roughly six officer pilots and 15 enlisted maintainers
- Sensors & processing systems: AN/SPS-49 air-search radar; AN/SPS-55 surface-search radar; CAS and STIR fire-control radar; AN/SQS-56 sonar.
- Electronic warfare & decoys: AN/SLQ-32
- Armament: As built: 1 × OTO Melara Mk 75 76 mm/62 caliber naval gun; 2 × Mk 32 triple-tube (324 mm) launchers for Mark 46 torpedoes; 1 × Vulcan Phalanx CIWS; 4 × .50-cal (12.7 mm) machine guns.; 1 × Mk 13 Mod 4 single-arm launcher for Harpoon anti-ship missiles and SM-1MR Standard anti-ship/air missiles (40 round magazine); Note: As of 2004, Mk 13 systems removed from all active US vessels of this class.
- Aircraft carried: 2 × SH-60 LAMPS III helicopters
- Aviation facilities: 2 × hangars; RAST helicopter hauldown system

USS Carr (FFG-52), is a decommissioned Oliver Hazard Perry-class frigate of the United States Navy.

== Namesake ==
Paul Henry Carr was born on 13 February 1924, at Webbers Falls, Oklahoma, and moved to Checotah, Oklahoma, early in his childhood. After joining the Navy on 27 May 1942, he received orders to join the USS Samuel B. Roberts in April 1944. During the Battle off Samar, on 25 October 1944, Gunners Mate Third Class Carr served as gun captain of the aft gun, Mount 52. After firing about 300 rounds, Mount 52 lost power. After managing to fire several more shots from the overheated gun, a round suddenly cooked off, blowing the gun apart and killing several of the crew. Although grievously wounded, Carr remained at his station, repeatedly attempting to load the last remaining shell into the destroyed gun by hand. With the battle still raging around him, Carr died of his wounds shortly before Samuel B. Roberts sank due to Imperial Japanese Navy shellfire. Carr was posthumously awarded the Silver Star.

== Construction and commissioning ==
Carr was laid down on 26 March 1982 by the Todd Pacific Shipyards Co., Seattle Division, Seattle, Wash.; launched on 26 February 1983; sponsored by Goldie Carr Bensilhe, GM3 Carr's widow; and commissioned on 27 July 1985, Commander Robert J. Horne in command.

== History ==
=== Operation Earnest Will ===
Carr's original homeport was in Charleston, South Carolina. Her first operational deployment was to the Persian Gulf, where she was involved in Operation Earnest Will, escorting reflagged oil tankers through the Strait of Hormuz. While Commander, Destroyer Squadron 14, was the senior officer present, Commander Wade C. Johnson, the captain of Carr, was the next senior officer in the area and was routinely assigned the duties of convoy commander during escort missions. During one of these, Iranian small boats approached the tankers and were chased off by bullets from Carr's deck-mounted M2 .50-caliber machine guns and the Bushmaster 25 mm chain gun on the starboard main deck.

=== Bonefish disaster ===
Carr returned to Charleston in late March 1988, and 31 days later, was ordered underway to replace another ship that had been unable to get underway. She was sent to sea to conduct antisubmarine exercises with the aircraft carrier John F. Kennedy and submarine Bonefish. On 24 April 1988, Carr was first on the scene to help rescue the crew of the attack submarine Bonefish, which had suffered a battery fire while submerged. Deploying her 26-foot (8 m) whaleboat and five inflatable life rafts, Carr helped rescue 89 of Bonefish's crew, using the whaleboat, life rafts, its embarked SH-60B Seahawk of Helicopter Squadron (Light) HSL-44 with crew LT Lee, AWs Laster and Hendrix, and the SH-3H Sea King helicopters from John F. Kennedy. The ship communicated to the land-based commander, Atlantic Fleet watch center using the Joint Operational Tactical System's "opnote" capability. Crew muster lists were sent ashore as rescued crew members were identified. For her professionalism in the rescue, Carr was awarded a Meritorious Unit Commendation.

=== Exercises in the Caribbean ===
In October 1988, Carr made a port visit to Tampa, Florida, at the request of the local Navy League chapter, mooring at Harbor Island pier. Public tours were held for several days in celebration of Navy Week, honoring the Navy's birthday. The commissioning commanding officer, Captain Robert Horne, was stationed at MacDill Air Force Base in Tampa and was there to greet the ship.

In March 1989, Carr was sent to Fleet Training Group, Guantanamo Bay, Cuba, for refresher training. While the ship conducted exercises in all departments, Mikhail Gorbachev was making a visit to Havana, Cuba. News crews from NBC, headed by Henry Champ, and ABC, by Bob Zelnick, each spent a day aboard Carr to observe the training.

In summer 1989, while Carr was heading to the Puerto Rican Operation Area for the Middle East Force Exercise (MEFEX), both of the ship's laundry washers broke down. With the permission of the squadron commodore running MEFEX, Carr's Seahawk helicopter flew into Naval Station Roosevelt Roads, Puerto Rico, and the supply officer purchased a household washing machine from the Navy Exchange. The washer was unboxed on the ramp at the airfield, loaded in the helicopter, and flown to the ship, where it was plumbed into the water system and served as the crew laundry for the next several weeks.

=== Hurricane Hugo ===
On 18 September 1989, Carr sailed from Charleston to be on station off the Naval Station Mayport for the week to provide a practice flight deck for the SH-60B Seahawk squadrons. That night, an officer of HSL-44 came aboard and informed the captain that the helicopters would be flying to Georgia the following day in preparation for the impending arrival of Hurricane Hugo. On the morning of 19 September, Carr entered Naval Station Mayport and moored, awaiting further instructions. At midnight on the 20th, Carr got underway and headed south to the Strait of Florida to avoid the storm. Once the hurricane safely passed, the captain ordered the ship to sail towards Charleston.

Carr was the first Navy vessel to return to the port of Charleston the morning after Hurricane Hugo made landfall there. Carr remained anchored for three days, unable to enter port, as essentially all navigation aids were moved or destroyed by the hurricane. One of the Coast Guard ships at anchor sent a small boat to the USCG Station in Charleston, taking along Carr's Sonar Technician Chief Petty Officer Steven Hatherly. STGC Hatherly made his way to the Naval Station, where he phoned most of the crew's families and reported their status to the ship via bridge-to-bridge VHF radio that evening. From their anchorage, the crew could easily see the bridge between the Isle of Palms and the mainland in the air, as well as the demolished houses along the shore. Local television stations were returning the transmitting, and the crew had little to do besides considering the condition of their families and possessions ashore.

Carr was ordered to proceed to Naval Station Mayport. Arriving the next morning, the local community had staged relief supplies to be taken to Charleston. The next day, Carr was directed to return to her homeport. Upon arrival, no shore services were available, so the engineering department kept the engineering plant online to provide power, air conditioning, fresh water, and other support services. Crew members were dispatched, during the day, to assist in the clean-up of the Naval Station, the Naval Weapons Station, and the local community. As time permitted, they also helped each other's families secure their belongings and clean up their homes. For this response to the natural disaster, Carr was awarded the Humanitarian Service Medal.

=== Change of command and return to the Persian Gulf ===
In early October 1989, the first formal ceremony of any type at the Naval Station held was the change of command for Carr, with Commander Edward "Ned" Bagley, III, USN, relieving Commander Wade C. Johnson, USN. The change of command was held in the morning and that afternoon, Commander, Destroyer Squadron 4 held their change of command.

On 31 October 1991, Carr sailed from Charleston for her third operational deployment, assigned to the commander, Middle East Force. En route the Red Sea, Carr made port visits to the Alicante, Palma Majorca, Spain; Naples Italy; Athens Greece; and Haifa, Israel, then transited the Suez Canal. During this deployment, Carr spend the first half assigned to tanker escort duties in the Strait of Hormuz and Maritime Interdiction Force in support of UN sanctions of Iraq. The latter part of the cruise was spent operating in the northern Red Sea, conducting electronic surveillance and early-warning duties for the units operating to the south. Carr left the Red Sea the end of March 1991 and returned to Charleston a month later.

=== Cooperative engagement capability ===
The Carr underwent major upgrades in 1995, leading to two dual-missile firing operations near Puerto Rico, testing a new generation of wireless-networked targeting and weapons systems.

=== Change of command and final two deployments ===
In October 2010, Carr's final change of command took place pier side in Norfolk, Virginia when Commander Patrick Kulakowski relieved Commander Eric Ver Hage. Carr completed a dry-docking availability at NORSHIPCO in Norfolk to close out 2010 before completing a January–February COMPTUEX in preparation for deployment. In June, 2011 Carr arrived in Staten Island, NY for New York City Fleet Week and Boston, MA for Dorchester Day. On 14 June 2011 (returned 15 Nov 2011) Carr departed for a combined Northern European Theater Security Cooperation Deployment and Caribbean Countering Illicit Traffic deployment. Countries visited included the Azores, England, Russia, Finland, Estonia, Lithuania, Latvia, Poland, Norway, Scotland, Cuba, Panama, Costa Rica, and Curaçao.

On 1 June 2012 (returned 30 Nov 2012) Carr departed Norfolk, VA on its final deployment to conduct Counter Illicit Trafficking in the Caribbean and Eastern Pacific. On 30 November 2012, Carr delivered 1.5 tons of cocaine and almost two tons of marijuana to Mayport, Florida, before continuing back to Norfolk.

=== Decommissioning ===
On 13 March 2013, Carr was decommissioned pierside at Naval Station Norfolk. She was subsequently towed to the Naval Inactive Ship Maintenance Facility in Philadelphia to await possible foreign military sale.
