= Oliver Hazard Perry-class frigate =

Class of guided-missile frigates

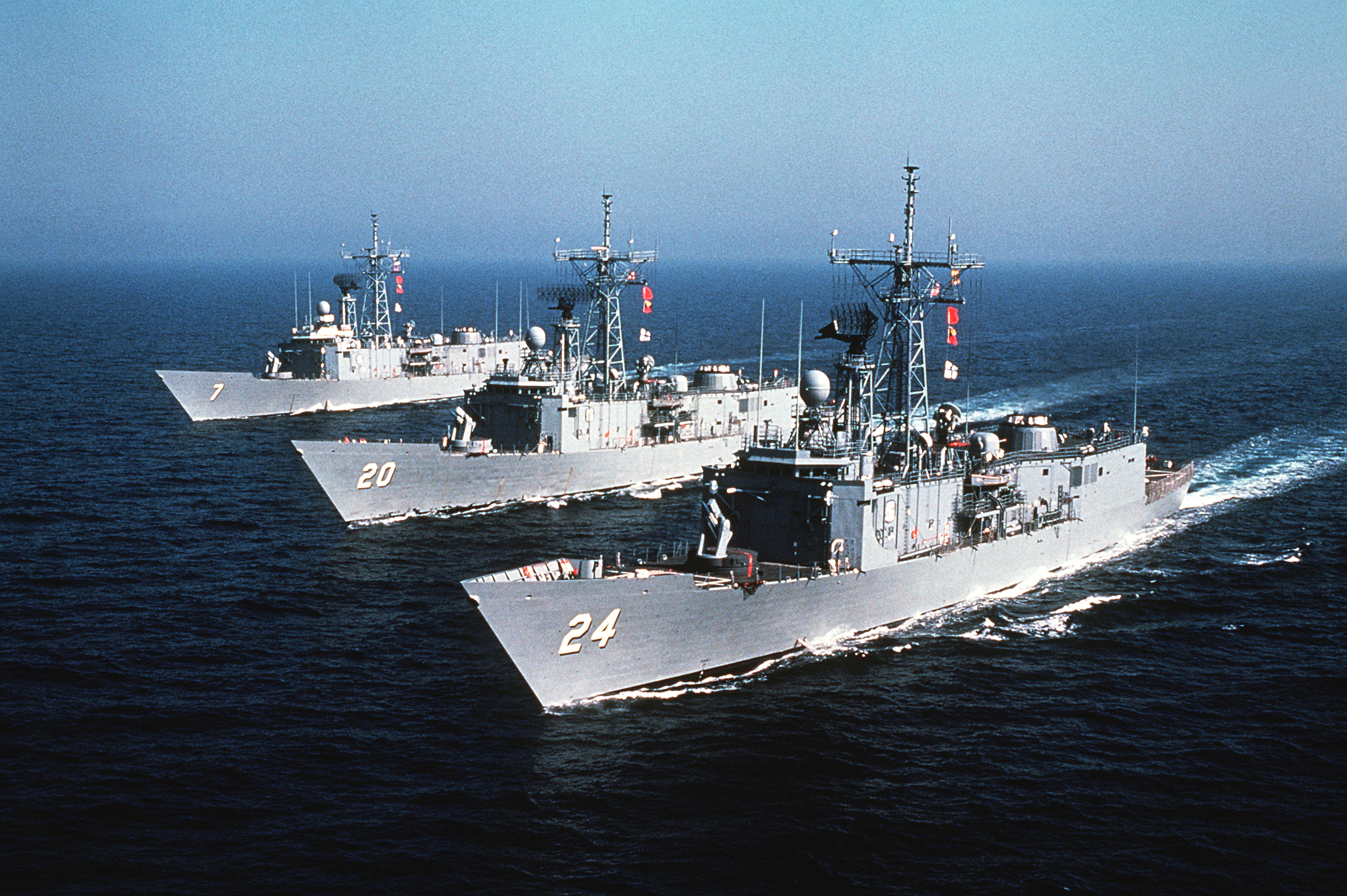
- The frigates Oliver Hazard Perry, Antrim, and Jack Williams in 1982

Class overview
- Name: Oliver Hazard Perry class
- Builders: Bath Iron Works; Todd Pacific Shipyards San Pedro; Todd Pacific Shipyards Seattle; Australian Marine Engineering Consolidated; Bazan; CSBC Corporation, Taiwan
- Operators: Turkish Navy; Royal Australian Navy (former); Royal Bahraini Naval Force; Republic of China Navy; Egyptian Navy; Pakistan Navy; Polish Navy; Spanish Navy; Chilean Navy; United States Navy (former)
- Preceded by: Brooke class
- Succeeded by: Constellation class
- Subclasses: Adelaide class (Australia); Cheng Kung class (Taiwan); G class (Turkey); Santa María class (Spain)
- Cost: US$122 million
- Built: 1975–2004
- In commission: 1977–present
- Planned: 71
- Completed: 71
- Active: 8 (Turkey); 4 (Egypt); 2 (Poland); 1 (Pakistan); 6 (Spain); 10 (Taiwan); 2 (Bahrain); 2 (Chile)
- Laid up: 5
- Retired: 51 (USN); some were transferred to other countries where they are in active service

General characteristics
- Type: Guided-missile frigate
- Displacement: 4,100 long tons (4,200 t) full load
- Length: 408 ft (124 m) waterline, 445 ft (136 m) overall, 453 ft (138 m) for "long-hull" frigates
- Beam: 45 ft (14 m)
- Draft: 22 ft (6.7 m)
- Installed power: 4 Detroit Diesel 16V149TI generator sets (750 kW (1,010 hp) each)
- Propulsion: 2 × General Electric LM2500-30 gas turbines generating 41,000 shp (31 MW) through a single shaft and variable pitch propeller; 2 × Auxiliary Propulsion Units, 350 hp (260 kW) retractable electric azimuth thrusters for maneuvering and docking.
- Speed: 30 knots (56 km/h; 35 mph)
- Range: 4,500 nmi (8,300 km; 5,200 mi) at 20 knots (37 km/h; 23 mph)
- Complement: 176
- Sensors & processing systems: Radar: AN/SPS-49, AN/SPS-55, Mk 92 fire-control system; Sonar: SQS-56, SQR-19 Towed Array
- Electronic warfare & decoys: AN/SLQ-32; Mark 36 SRBOC; AN/SLQ-25 Nixie
- Armament: 1 × single-arm Mk 13 Missile Launcher with a 40-missile magazine that contains SM-1MR anti-aircraft guided missiles and Harpoon anti-ship missiles. Removed from the U.S. Navy ships starting in 2003 on retirement of the SM-1 missile.; Mk 38 Mod 2 Machine Gun Systems installed on platforms over the removed MK 13 launchers; 2 × triple Mark 32 Anti-submarine warfare torpedo tubes with Mark 46 or Mark 50 anti-submarine warfare torpedo (24 torpedoes); 1 × OTO Melara 76 mm/62 caliber naval gun; 1 × 20 mm Phalanx CIWS; 8 × Hsiung Feng II SSM or 4 HF-2 and 4 HF-3 supersonic AShM, plus 2 Bofors 40 mm/L70 guns (on Taiwanese vessels only)
- Aircraft carried: 2 × LAMPS multi-purpose helicopters (the SH-2 Seasprite LAMPS I on the short-hulled ships or the SH-60B Seahawk LAMPS III on the long-hulled ships)

The Oliver Hazard Perry class is a class of guided-missile frigates named after U.S. Commodore Oliver Hazard Perry, a commander noted for his role in the Battle of Lake Erie. Also known as an "OHP" or FFG-7 (commonly "fig seven") class, the warships were designed in the United States in the mid-1970s as general-purpose escort vessels inexpensive enough to be bought in large numbers to replace World War II-era destroyers and complement 1960s-era Knox-class frigates.

In Admiral Elmo Zumwalt's "high low fleet plan", the FFG-7s were the low-capability ships, with the Spruance-class destroyers serving as the high-capability ships. Intended to protect amphibious landing forces, supply and replenishment groups, and merchant convoys from aircraft and submarines, they were also later part of battleship-centered surface action groups and aircraft carrier battle groups/strike groups. 55 ships were built in the United States: 51 for the United States Navy and four for the Royal Australian Navy (RAN). Eight were built in Taiwan, six in Spain, and two in Australia for their navies. Former U.S. Navy warships of this class have been sold or donated to the navies of Bahrain, Egypt, Poland, Pakistan, Taiwan, and Turkey.

The first of the 51 U.S. Navy-built Oliver Hazard Perry frigates entered into service in 1977, and the last remaining in active service, USS Simpson, was decommissioned on 29 September 2015. The retired vessels were mostly mothballed with some transferred to other navies for continued service and some used as weapons targets and sunk. Some of the U.S. Navy's frigates, such as USS Duncan (14.6 years in service), had fairly short careers, while a few lasted as long as 30+ years in active U.S. service, with some lasting even longer after being sold or donated to other navies. In 2020, the Navy announced the new Constellation class as their latest class of frigates. The Constellation-class frigate was cancelled in 2025, though the two ships being built will be completed. It will be replaced with the FF(X) variant of the United States Coast Guard's National Security Cutter and a possible foreign-sourced in production frigate design.

== Design and construction ==
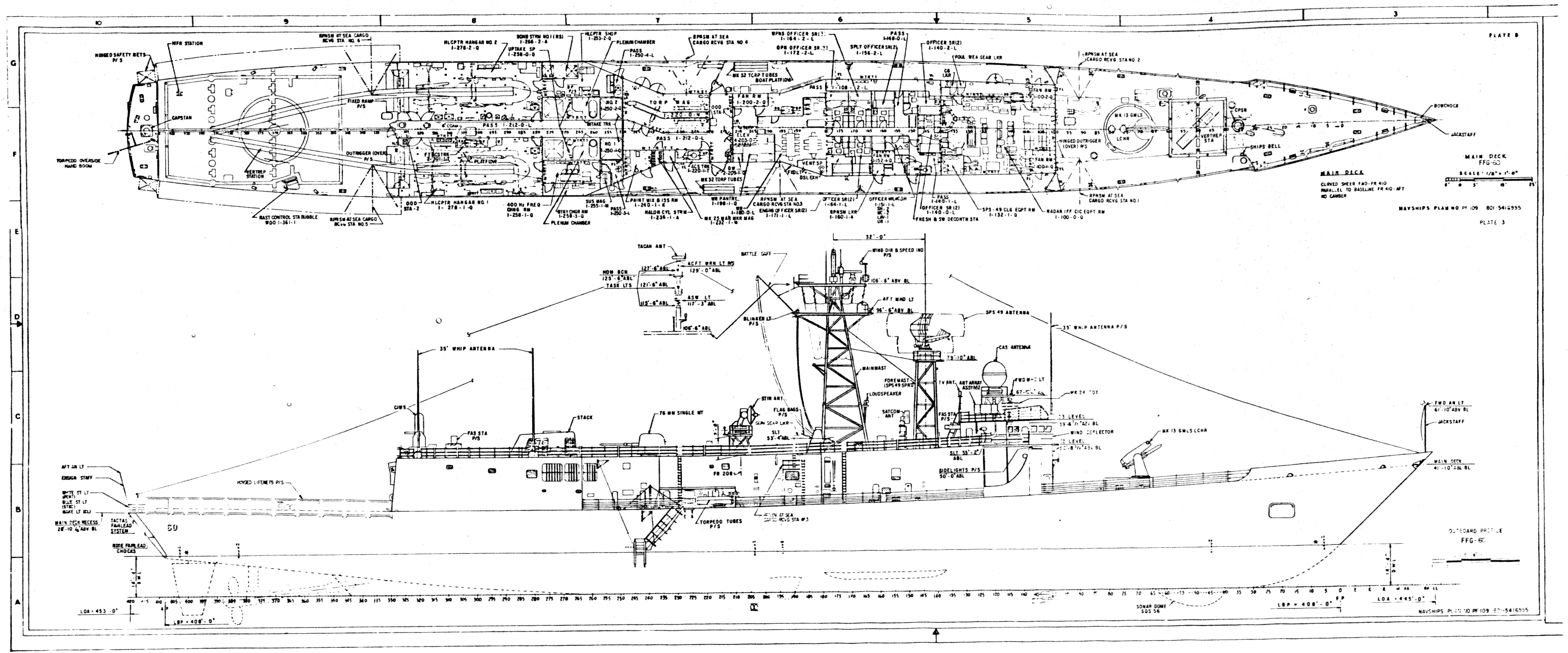
Outboard profile of the "long-hull" design

The ships were designed by the Bath Iron Works shipyard in Maine in partnership with naval architects Gibbs & Cox. The design process was notable as the initial design was accomplished with the help of computers in 18 hours by Raye Montague, a civilian U.S. Navy naval engineer, making it the first ship designed by computer.

The Oliver Hazard Perry-class ships were produced in 445-foot (136 m) long "short-hull" (Flight I) and 453-foot (138 m) long "long-hull" (Flight III) variants. The long-hull ships (FFG 8, 28, 29, 32, 33, and 36–61) carry the larger SH-60 Seahawk LAMPS III helicopters, while the short-hulled warships carry the smaller and less-capable SH-2 Seasprite LAMPS I. Aside from the lengths of their hulls, the principal difference between the versions is the location of the aft capstan: on long-hull ships, it sits a step below the level of the flight deck to provide clearance for the tail rotor of the longer Seahawk helicopters.

The long-hull ships carry the RAST (Recovery Assist Securing and Traversing) system (also known as a Beartrap (hauldown device)) for the Seahawk. It is a hook, cable, and winch system that can reel in a Seahawk from a hovering flight, expanding the ship's pitch-and-roll range in which flight operations are permitted. The FFG 8, 29, 32, and 33 were built as "short-hull" warships but were later modified into "long-hull" warships.

Oliver Hazard Perry-class frigates were the second class of surface ships (after the Spruance-class destroyers) in the U.S. Navy to be built with gas turbine propulsion. The gas turbine propulsion plant was more automated than other Navy propulsion plants at the time, and it could be centrally monitored and controlled from a remote engineering control center away from the engines. The gas turbine propulsion plants also allowed the ship's speed to be controlled directly from the bridge via a throttle control, a first for the U.S. Navy.

American shipyards constructed Oliver Hazard Perry-class ships for the U.S. Navy and the Royal Australian Navy (RAN). Early American-built Australian ships were originally built as the "short-hull" version, but they were modified during the 1980s to the "long-hull" design. Shipyards in Australia, Spain, and Taiwan produced several warships of the "long-hull" design for their navies.

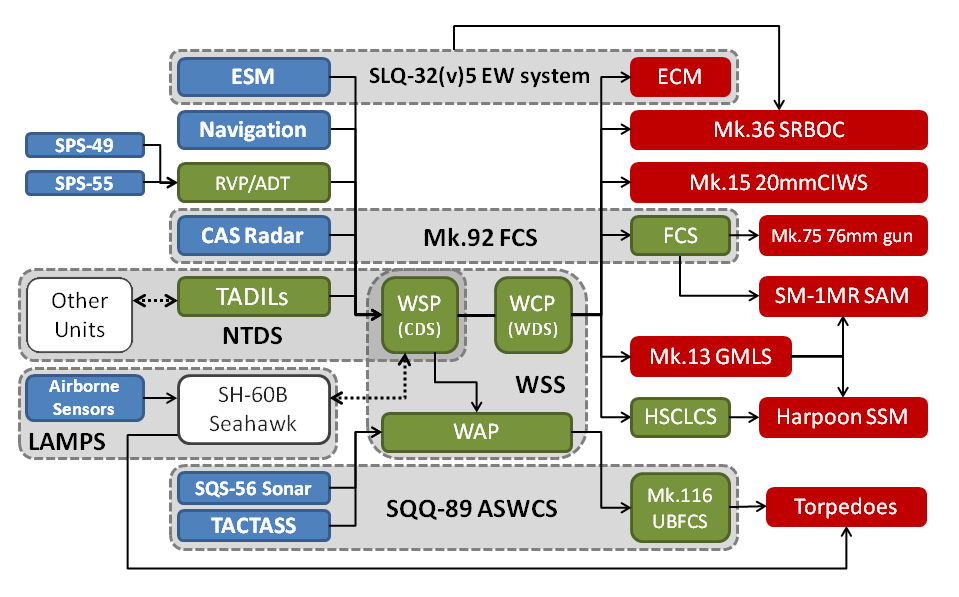
Scheme of the combat systems of the Oliver Hazard Perry-class frigate

Although the per-ship costs rose greatly over the period of production, all 51 ships planned for the U.S. Navy were built.

During the design phase of the Oliver Hazard Perry class, the head of the Royal Corps of Naval Constructors, R.J. Daniels, was invited by an old friend, U.S. Chief of the Bureau of Ships, Admiral Robert C. Gooding, to advise upon the use of variable-pitch propellers in the class. During this conversation, Daniels warned Gooding against the use of aluminium in the superstructure of the FFG-7 class as he believed it would lead to structural weaknesses. A number of ships subsequently developed structural cracks, including a 40 ft (12 m) fissure in USS Duncan, before the problems were remedied.

The Oliver Hazard Perry-class frigates were designed primarily as anti-aircraft and anti-submarine warfare guided-missile warships intended to provide open-ocean escort of amphibious warfare ships and merchant ship convoys in moderate threat environments in a potential war with the Soviet Union and the Warsaw Pact countries. They could also provide air defense against 1970s- and 1980s-era aircraft and anti-ship missiles. These warships are equipped to escort and protect aircraft carrier battle groups, amphibious landing groups, underway replenishment groups, and merchant ship convoys. They can conduct independent operations to perform tasks such as surveillance of illegal drug smugglers, maritime interception operations, and exercises with other nations.

The addition of the Naval Tactical Data System, LAMPS helicopters, and the Tactical Towed Array System (TACTAS) gave these warships a combat capability far beyond the original expectations. They are well suited for operations in littoral regions and most war-at-sea scenarios.

== Notable combat actions ==
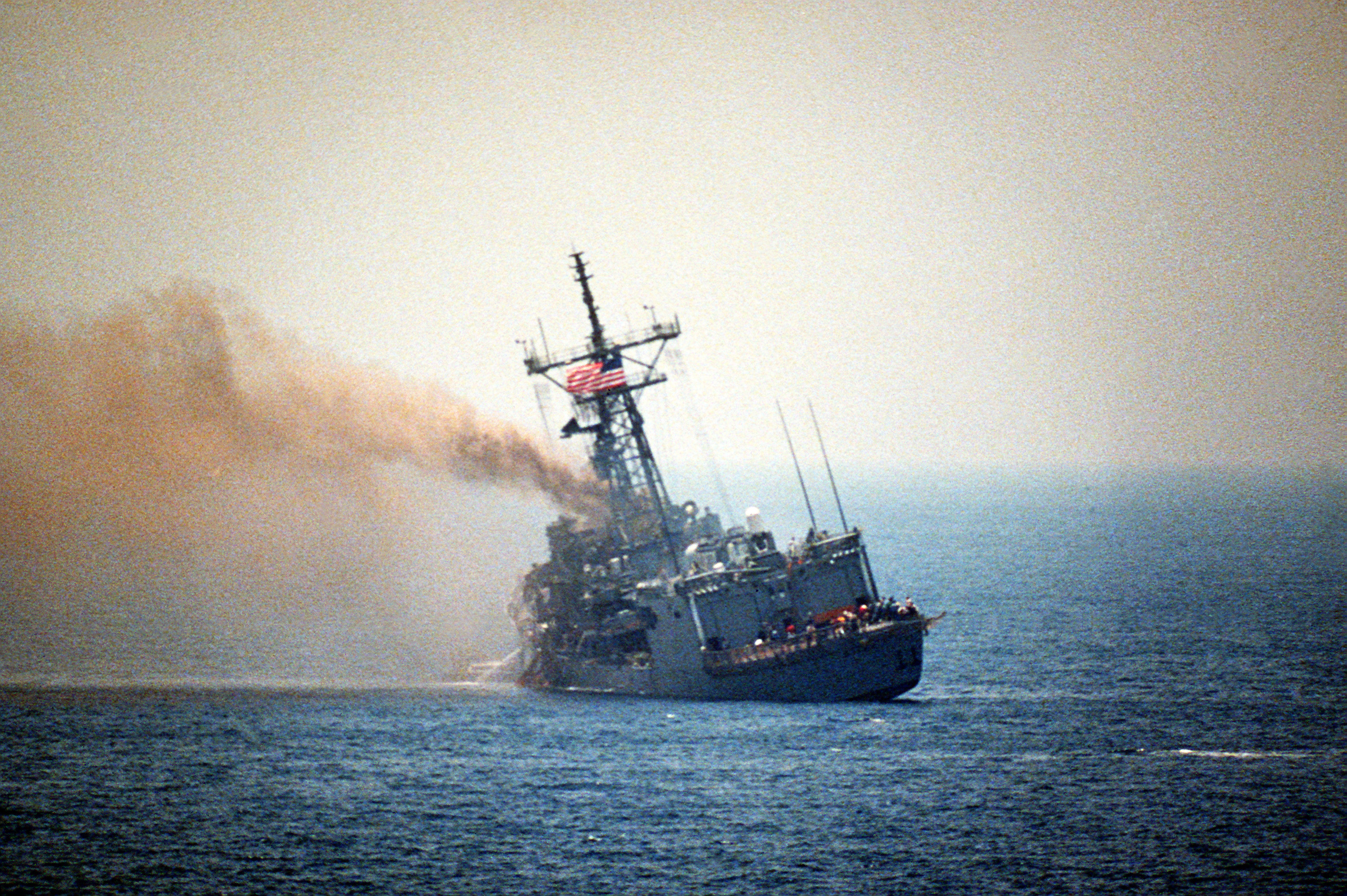
USS Stark listing to port following an air attack during the Iran-Iraq War

Oliver Hazard Perry-class frigates made worldwide news during the 1980s. Despite being small, these frigates were shown to be very durable. During the Iran–Iraq War, on 17 May 1987, USS Stark was attacked by an Iraqi warplane and struck by two Exocet anti-ship missiles. Thirty-seven U.S. Navy sailors died in the deadly prelude to the American Operation Earnest Will, the reflagging and escorting of oil tankers through the Persian Gulf and the Straits of Hormuz.

Less than a year later, on 14 April 1988, USS Samuel B. Roberts was nearly sunk by an Iranian mine. There were no deaths, but ten sailors were evacuated from the warship for medical treatment. The crew of Samuel B. Roberts battled fire and flooding for two days, ultimately managing to save the ship. The U.S. Navy retaliated four days later with Operation Praying Mantis, a one-day attack on Iranian oil platforms being used as bases for raids on merchant shipping. Those had included bases for the minelaying operations that damaged Samuel B. Roberts. Stark and Roberts were each repaired in American shipyards and returned to full service. Stark was decommissioned in 1999 and scrapped in 2006. Roberts was decommissioned at Mayport on 22 May 2015.

On 18 April 1988, USS Simpson was accompanying the cruiser USS Wainwright and frigate USS Bagley when they came under attack from the Iranian gunboat Joshan, which fired a U.S.-made Harpoon anti-ship missile at the ships. With Simpson having the only clear shot, the frigate fired an SM-1 standard missile, which struck Joshan. Simpson fired three more SM-1s, and with later naval fire from Wainwright, sank the Iranian vessel.

== Modifications ==
=== United States ===
The United States Navy and Royal Australian Navy modified their remaining Perrys to reduce their operating costs, replacing Detroit Diesel 16V149TI electrical generators with Caterpillar 3512B diesel engines.

Upgrades to the Perry class were problematic due to "little reserved space for growth (39 tons in the original design), and the inflexible, proprietary electronics of the time", such that the "US Navy gave up on the idea of upgrades to face new communications realities and advanced missile threats". The U.S. Navy decommissioned 25 "FFG-7 Short" ships via "bargain basement sales to allies or outright retirement, after an average of only 18 years of service".

From 2004 to 2005, the U.S. Navy removed the frigates' Mk 13 single-arm missile launchers because the primary missile, the Standard SM-1MR, had become outmoded. It would supposedly have been too costly to refit the Standard SM-1MR missiles, which had little ability to bring down sea-skimming missiles. Another reason was to allow more SM-1MRs to go to American allies that operated Perrys, such as Poland, Spain, Australia, Turkey, and Taiwan. As a result, the "zone-defense" anti-aircraft warfare (AAW) capability of the U.S. Navy's Perrys had vanished, and all that remained was a "point-defense" type of anti-air warfare armament, so they relied upon cover from AEGIS destroyers and cruisers.

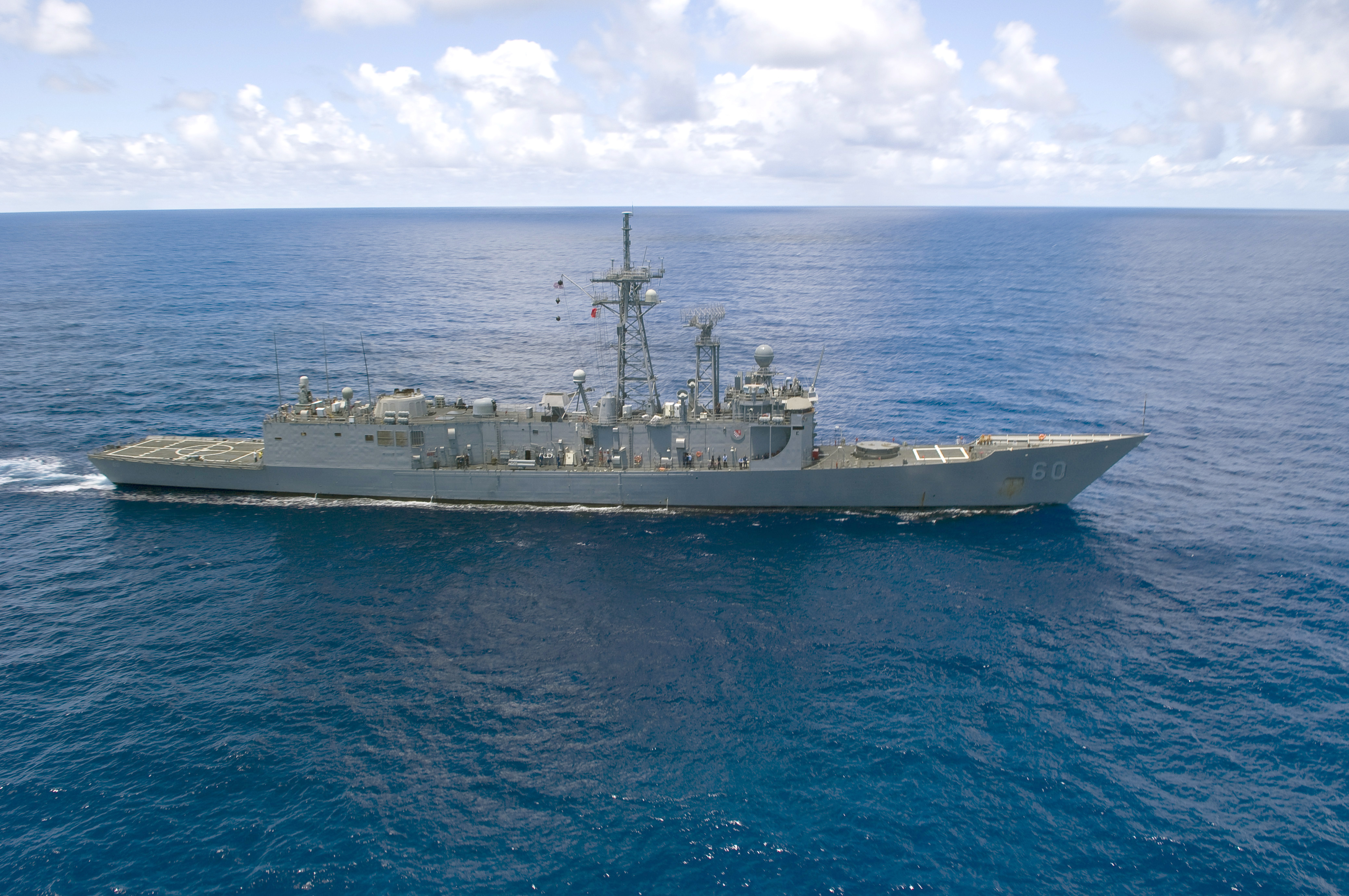
USS Rodney M. Davis after the removal of her foredeck Mk 13 missile launcher

The removal of the Mk 13 launchers also stripped the frigates of their Harpoon anti-ship missiles. However, their Seahawk helicopters could still carry the much shorter-range Penguin and Hellfire anti-ship missiles. The last nine ships of the class had new remotely operated 25 mm Mk 38 Mod 2 Machine Gun Systems (MGSs) installed on platforms over the old Mk 13 launcher magazine.

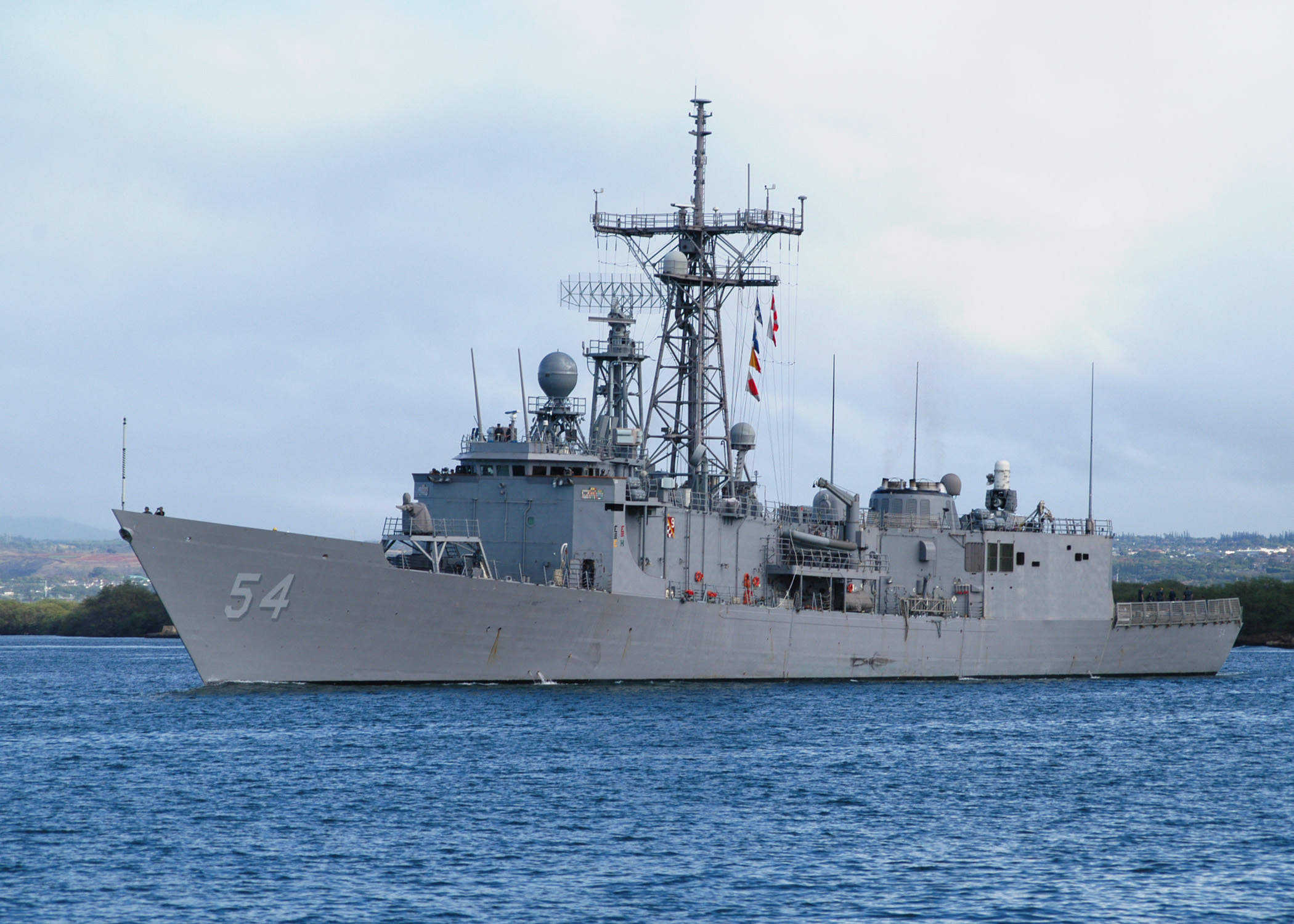
USS Ford with Mk 38 Mod 2 MGS

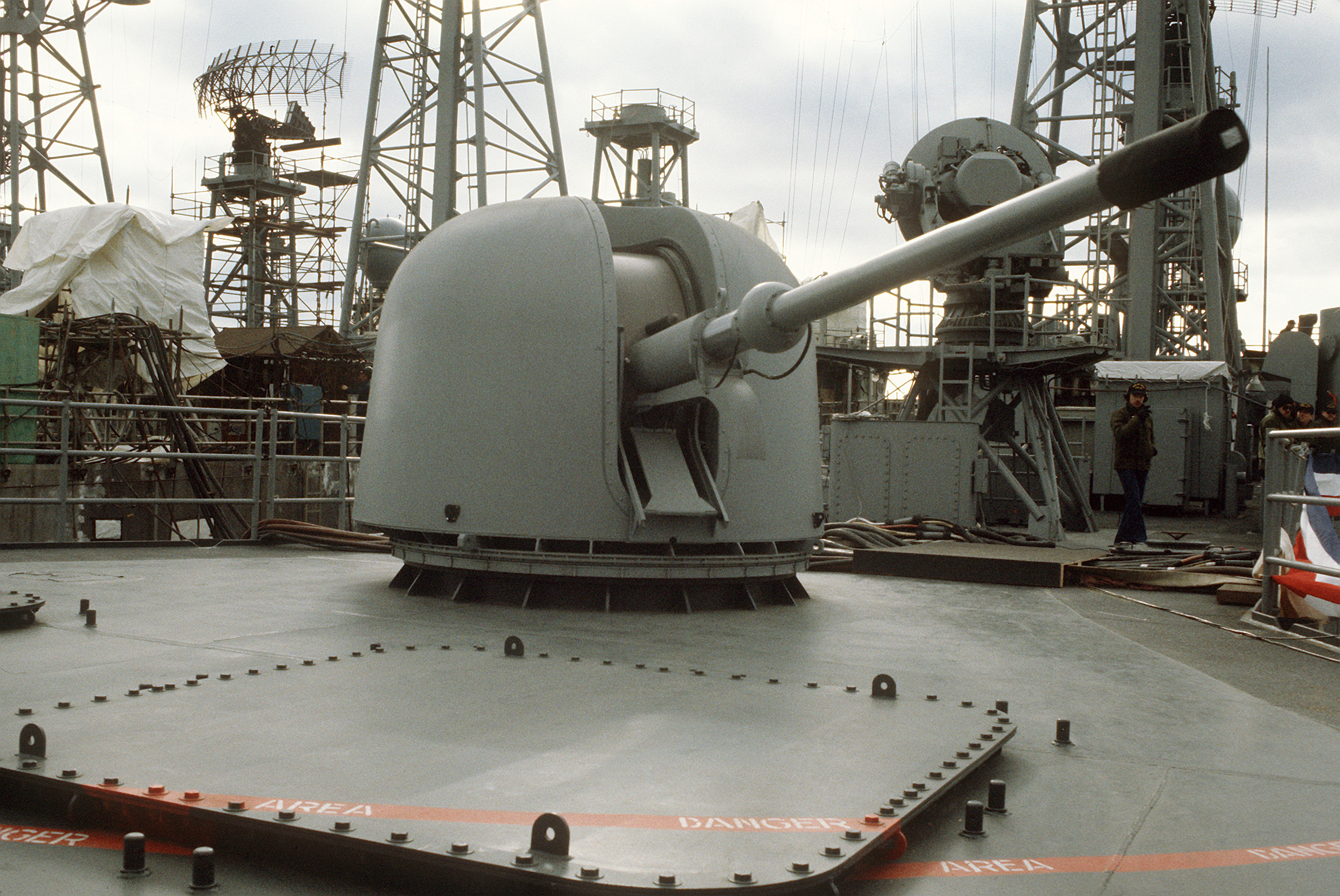
Oliver Hazard Perry-class frigate 76 mm 62-caliber Mk 75 anti-aircraft gun

Up to 2002, the U.S. Navy updated the remaining active Oliver Hazard Perry-class warships' Phalanx CIWS to the "Block 1B" capability, which allowed the Mk 15 20 mm Phalanx gun to shoot at fast-moving surface craft and helicopters. They were also to have been fitted with the Mk 53 Decoy Launching System "Nulka" in place of the SRBOC (Super Rapid Blooming Offboard Chaff) and flares, which would have better protected the ship against anti-ship missiles. It was planned to outfit the remaining ships with a 21-cell RIM-116 Rolling Airframe Missile launcher at the location of the former Mk 13, but this did not occur.

On 11 May 2009, the first International Frigate Working Group met at Mayport Naval Station to discuss maintenance, obsolescence, and logistics issues regarding Oliver Hazard Perry-class ships of the U.S. and foreign navies.

On 16 June 2009, Vice Admiral Barry McCullough turned down the suggestion of then-U.S. Senator Mel Martinez (R-FL) to keep the Perrys in service, citing their worn-out and maxed-out condition. However, U.S. Representative Ander Crenshaw (R-FL) and former U.S. Representative Gene Taylor (D-MS) took up the cause to retain the vessels.

The Oliver Hazard Perry-class frigates were to have been eventually replaced by Littoral Combat Ships by 2019. However, the worn-out frigates were being retired faster than the LCSs were being built, which may lead to a gap in United States Southern Command mission coverage. According to Navy deactivation plans, all Oliver Hazard Perry-class frigates would be retired by October 2015. Simpson was the last to be retired (on 29 September 2015), leaving the Navy devoid of frigates for the first time since 1943. The ships will either be made available for sale to foreign navies or dismantled.

Perry-class frigate retirement was accelerated by budget pressures, leading to the remaining 11 ships being replaced by only eight LCS hulls. With the timeline LCS mission packages will come online unknown, there is uncertainty if they will be able to perform the frigates' counter-narcotics and anti-submarine roles when they are gone. The Navy is looking into Military Sealift Command to see if the Joint High Speed Vessel, Mobile Landing Platform, and other auxiliary ships could handle low-end missions that the frigates performed.

The U.S. Coast Guard harvested weapons systems components from decommissioned Navy Perry-class frigates to save money. Harvesting components from four decommissioned frigates resulted in more than $24 million in cost savings, which increases with parts from more decommissioned frigates. Equipment including Mk 75 76 mm/62 caliber gun mounts, gun control panels, barrels, launchers, junction boxes, and other components was returned to service aboard Famous-class cutters to extend their service lives into the 2030s.

In June 2017, Chief of Naval Operations Admiral John Richardson revealed the Navy was "taking a hard look" at reactivating 7-8 out of 12 mothballed Perry-class frigates to increase fleet numbers. While the move was under consideration, there would be difficulties in returning them to service given the age of the ships and their equipment, likely requiring a significant modernization effort. Although bringing the frigates out of retirement would have provided a short-term solution to fleet size, their limited combat capability would restrict them to acting as a theater security cooperation, maritime security asset. Their likely role would have been serving as basic surface platforms that stay close to U.S. shores, performing missions such as assisting drug interdiction efforts or patrolling the Arctic so an extensive upgrade to the ships' combat systems would not need to be undertaken. An October 2017 memo recommended against reactivating the frigates, claiming it would cost too much money, taking funding away from other Navy priorities for ships with little effectiveness.

=== Australia ===
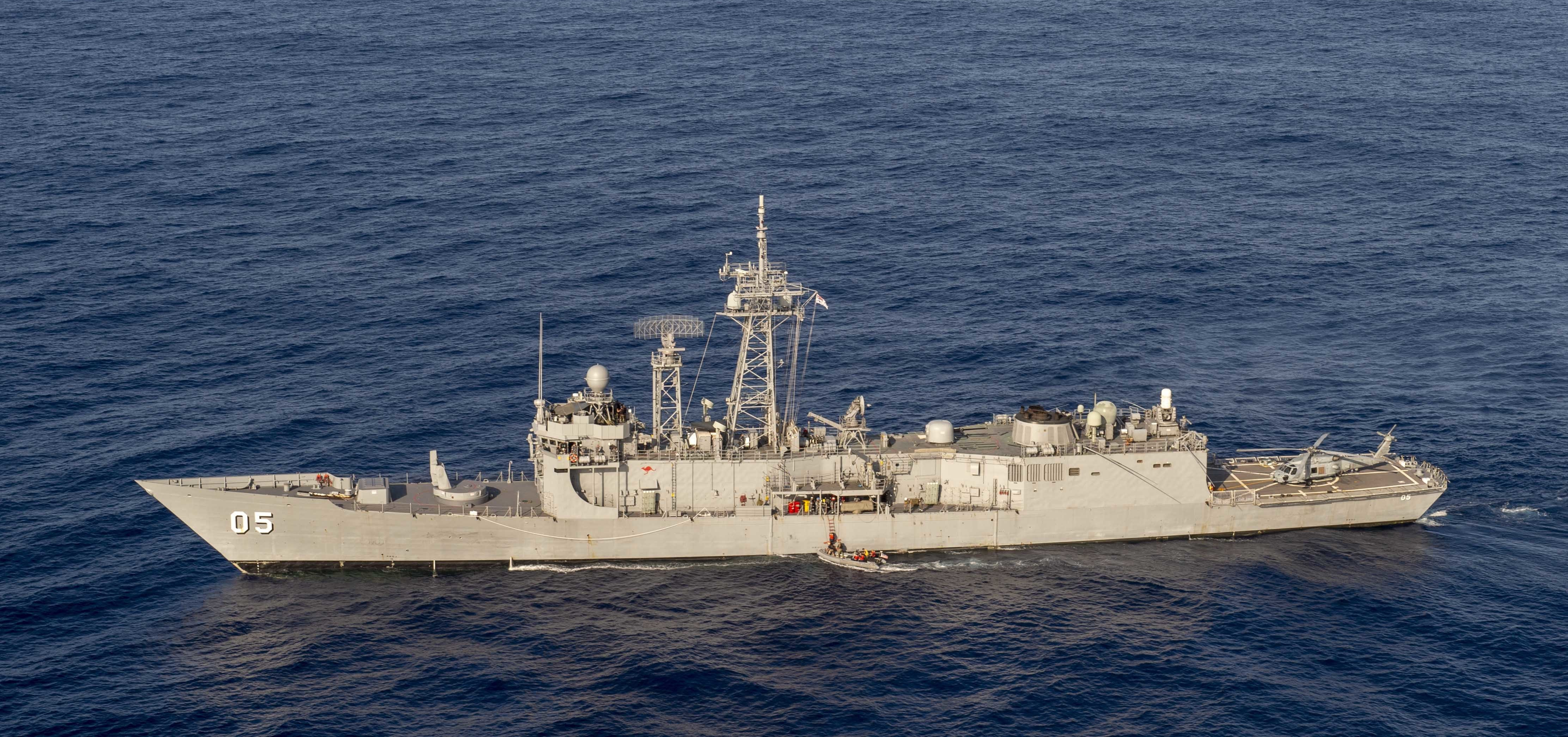
HMAS Melbourne at sea in 2019. The eight-cell Mark 41 installation can be seen on the ship's foredeck, just ahead of the single arm Mark-13 launcher.

Australia spent A$1.46bn to upgrade the Royal Australian Navy's (RAN) Adelaide-class guided-missile frigates, including equipping them to fire the SM-2 version of the Standard missile, adding an eight-cell Mark 41 Vertical Launching System (VLS) for Evolved Sea Sparrow Missiles (ESSMs), and installing better air-search radars and long-range sonar. The RAN had opted to retain their Adelaide frigates rather than purchase the U.S. Navy's Kidd-class destroyers; the Kidds were more capable but more expensive and manpower intensive. However, the upgrade project ran over budget and fell behind schedule.

The first of the upgraded frigates, HMAS Sydney, returned to the RAN fleet in 2005. Four frigates were eventually upgraded at the Garden Island shipyard in Sydney, Australia, with the modernizations lasting between 18 months and two years. The cost of the upgrades was partly offset, in the short run, by the decommissioning and disposal of the two older frigates. HMAS Canberra was decommissioned on 12 November 2005 at naval base HMAS Stirling in Western Australia, and HMAS Adelaide was decommissioned at that same naval base on 20 January 2008. HMAS Sydney was decommissioned at the Garden Island naval base in 2016. HMAS Darwin was also decommissioned at Garden Island in 2018.

The Adelaide-class frigates were replaced by three Spanish-designed Hobart-class air warfare destroyers equipped with the AEGIS combat system. HMAS Melbourne and Newcastle were transferred in May 2020 to the Chilean Navy and serve as Capitan Prat and Almirante Latorre.

=== Turkey ===
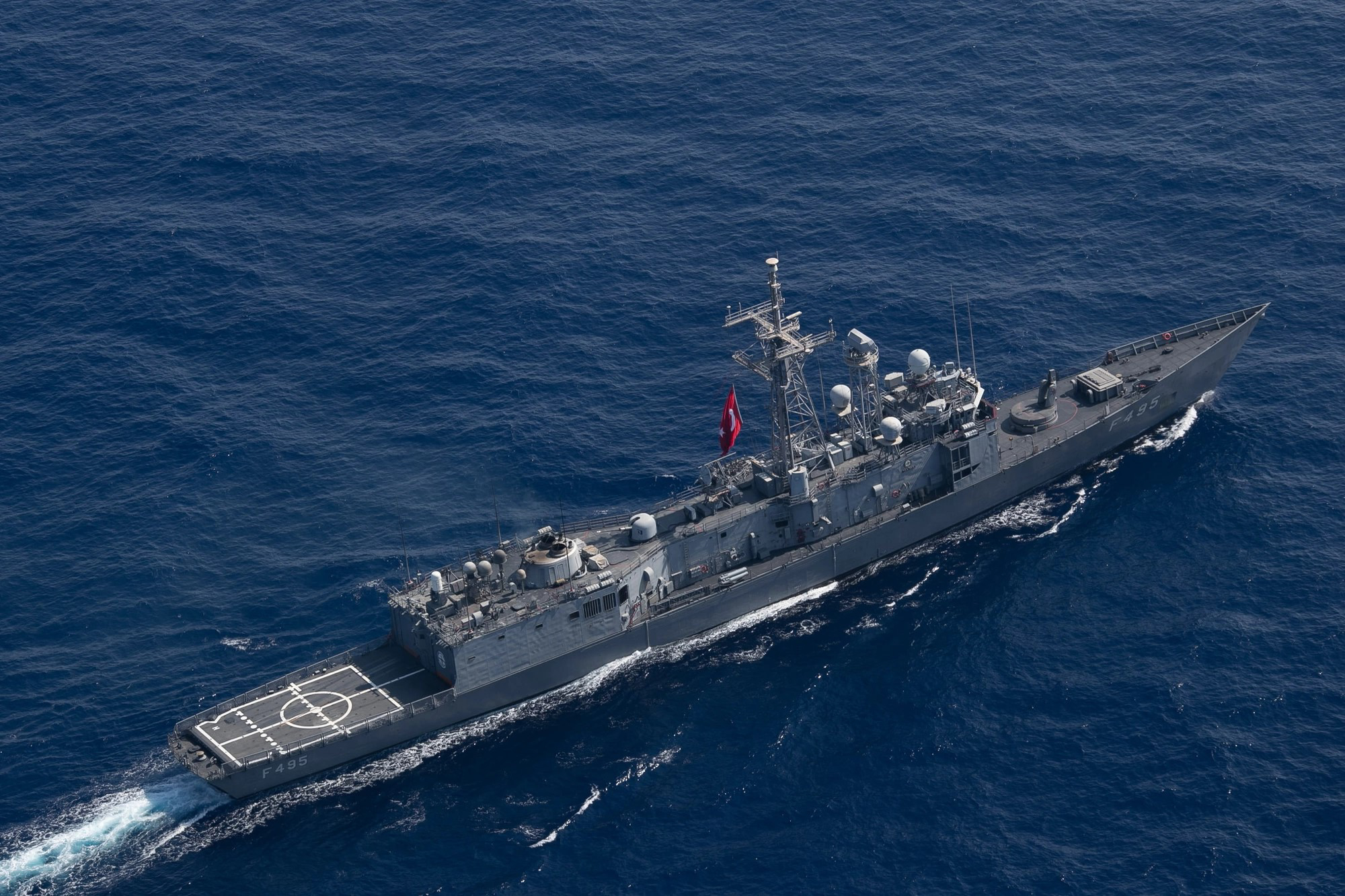
TCG Göksu (F-497) in the Mediterranean Sea on August 21, 2023. The G-class frigates are equipped with the GENESIS combat management system, SMART-S Mk2 3D radar and Mk. 41 VLS, which has been installed in front of the Mk. 13 GMLS.

The G-class frigates of the Turkish Navy have undergone a major modernisation program, which included the retrofitting of a Turkish digital combat management system named GENESIS (Gemi Entegre Savaş İdare Sistemi). The system was designed and implemented jointly by the Turkish Navy and HAVELSAN, a Turkish electronic hardware systems and software company. The GENESIS upgraded ships were delivered between 2007 and 2011.

The GENESIS advanced combat management system has the capacity of tracking more than 1,000 tactical targets, thanks to its digital sensor data fusion, automatic threat evaluation, weapon engagement opportunities, and Link-16/22 system integration.

The modernisation program also included the addition of an 8-cell Mk.41 VLS for RIM-162 ESSM, together with the upgrade of the Mk-92 fire control system by Lockheed Martin; the retrofitting of the SMART-S Mk2 3D air search radar, which replaced the AN/SPS-49; and the addition of a new, long range sonar.

The Mk.41 vertical launching system (VLS) has been fitted in front of the Mk.13 launcher. TCG Gediz was the first ship in the class to receive the Mk.41 VLS installation.

The G-class frigates of the Turkish Navy were also modified with the ASIST landing platform system at the Istanbul Naval Shipyard, so that they can accommodate the S-70B Seahawk helicopter.

== Operators ==
- Bahrain: USS Jack Williams was purchased from the American government in 1996 and re-christened Sabha.
- Chile: On 27 December 2019, it was announced that Australia had sold HMAS Newcastle and HMAS Melbourne to Chile. Both frigates were delivered to the Chilean Navy in May 2020 and named Capitan Prat and Almirante Latorre.
- Egypt: Four Oliver Hazard Perry-class frigates were transferred from the U.S. Navy between 1996 and 1999.
- Pakistan: The former USS McInerney transferred to the Pakistani Navy as PNS Alamgir (F260) in August 2010.
- Poland: Two frigates were transferred from the U.S. Navy in 2000 and 2002.
- Spain (Santa María class): Spanish-built: six frigates.
- Taiwan (Cheng Kung class): Taiwanese-built. Originally, eight ships were equipped with eight Hsiung Feng II anti-ship missiles. Now, all but PFG-1103 are carrying four HF-2 and four HF-3 supersonic AShM. The PFG-1103 Cheng Ho will change the anti-ship mix upon their major overhaul. Seven out of eight ships added Bofors 40 mm/L70 guns for both surface and anti-air use. On 5 November 2012, Minister of Defense Kao announced the U.S. government would sell Taiwan two additional Perry-class frigates that are about to be retired from the U.S. Navy for a cost of US$240 million to be retrofitted and delivered in 2015. The ex-USS Gary and the ex-USS Taylor were to be reactivated and transferred to Taiwan. In July 2016, the U.S. Naval Sea Systems Command awarded a $74 million contract to Virginia-based VSE Corporation to do the work. According to the contract, VSE had 16 months to complete the work. The U.S. State Department officially approved the sale of both ships for $190 million in March 2016. The ships were commissioned into ROCN service on 8 November 2018.
- Turkey (G class): Eight former U.S. Navy Oliver Hazard Perry-class frigates were transferred to the Turkish Navy between 1998 and 2003. All have undergone extensive advanced modernization programs, and they are now known as the G-class frigates. The Turkish Navy modernized G-class frigates have an additional Mk 41 VLS capable of launching ESSMs for closer-in defense and longer-range SM-1 missiles, advanced digital fire control systems, and new Turkish-made sonars.

=== Potential operators ===
- Mexico: Two former U.S. Navy Oliver Hazard Perry-class frigates USS McClusky and USS Curts were to be sold to the Mexican Navy under the FMS program; however, USS McClusky was sunk as a target during RIMPAC 2018 on 19 July 2018 and USS Curts was sunk as a target during Valiant Shield 2020 on 19 September 2020.
- Thailand: Two former U.S. Navy Oliver Hazard Perry-class frigates were allocated by the U.S. government to the Royal Thai Navy, subject to acceptance by the Thai government: the former USS Rentz and USS Vandegrift. This transfer was not carried out; Rentz was sunk as a target during Exercise Valiant Shield 2016, and Vandegrift was sunk as a target during Exercise Valiant Shield 2022.
- Ukraine: Two former U.S. Navy Oliver Hazard Perry-class ships were offered to the Ukrainian Navy in 2018 to increase its operational capacity in the Azov and Black seas after it was significantly reduced following the annexation of Crimea by Russia (a large part of Ukrainian navy vessels stationed there were seized).

=== Former operators ===
- Australia (Adelaide class): The Royal Australian Navy purchased six frigates. Four of them were built in the United States, while the other two were built in Australia. Four of the ships were upgraded with the addition of an eight-cell Mk 41 VLS with 32 ESSMs, and the Standard Missile SM-2, plus upgraded radars and sonars, while the other two ships were decommissioned at that time. They have been replaced by the Hobart-class air-warfare destroyers, with the last Adelaide-class frigate HMAS Melbourne retiring on 26 October 2019.
- United States: The U.S. Navy commissioned 51 FFG-7 class frigates between 1977 and 1989. The last of these, Simpson, was decommissioned on 29 September 2015.

== List of vessels ==
Ship name	Hull no.	Hull length	Builder	Laid down	Launched	Commissioned	Decommissioned	Fate	Link
U.S.-built
Oliver Hazard Perry	FFG-7	Short	Bath Iron Works	12 June 1975	25 September 1976	17 December 1977	20 February 1997	Disposed of by scrapping, dismantling, 21 April 2006	
McInerney	FFG-8	Long	Bath Iron Works	16 January 1978	4 November 1978	15 December 1979	31 August 2010	Transferred to Pakistan Navy as PNS Alamgir (F260), 31 August 2010	
Wadsworth	FFG-9	Short	Todd Pacific Shipyards, Los Angeles Division, (Todd, San Pedro)	13 July 1977	29 July 1978	2 April 1980	28 June 2002	Transferred to Polish Navy as ORP Gen. T. Kościuszko (273), 28 June 2002	
Duncan	FFG-10	Short	Todd Pacific Shipyards, Seattle Division	29 April 1977	1 March 1978	15 May 1980	17 December 1994	Transferred to Turkish Naval Forces as a parts hulk, 5 April 1999. Scuttled October 2017	Archived nvr.navy.mil website
Clark	FFG-11	Short	Bath Iron Works	17 July 1978	24 March 1979	9 May 1980	15 March 2000	Transferred to Polish Navy as ORP Gen. K. Pułaski (272), 15 March 2000	
George Philip	FFG-12	Short	Todd, San Pedro	14 December 1977	16 December 1978	10 October 1980	15 March 2003	Disposed of by scrapping, dismantling, 23 January 2017	
Samuel Eliot Morison	FFG-13	Short	Bath Iron Works	4 December 1978	14 July 1979	11 October 1980	10 April 2002	Transferred to Turkish Naval Forces as TCG Gokova (F 496), 11 April 2002	
Sides	FFG-14	Short	Todd, San Pedro	7 August 1978	19 May 1979	30 May 1981	28 February 2003	Disposed of by scrapping, dismantling, 25 January 2016	
Estocin	FFG-15	Short	Bath Iron Works	2 April 1979	3 November 1979	10 January 1981	3 April 2003	Transferred to Turkish Naval Forces as TCG Goksu (F497), 3 April 2003	
Clifton Sprague	FFG-16	Short	Bath Iron Works	30 July 1979	16 February 1980	21 March 1981	2 June 1995	Transferred to Turkish Naval Forces as TCG Gaziantep (F490), 27 August 1997	
Built for Royal Australian Navy as HMAS Adelaide	FFG-17	Short	Todd, Seattle	29 July 1977	21 June 1978	15 November 1980	19 January 2008	Disposed, sunk as diving & fishing reef, 13 April 2011	
Built for Royal Australian Navy as HMAS Canberra	FFG-18	Short	Todd, Seattle	1 March 1978	1 December 1978	21 March 1981	12 November 2005	Disposed, sunk as diving & fishing reef, 4 October 2009	
John A. Moore	FFG-19	Short	Todd, San Pedro	19 December 1978	20 October 1979	14 November 1981	1 September 2000	Transferred to Turkish Naval Forces as TCG Gediz (F495), 1 September 2000	
Antrim	FFG-20	Short	Todd, Seattle	21 June 1978	27 March 1979	26 September 1981	8 May 1996	Transferred to Turkish Naval Forces as TCG Giresun (F491), 27 August 1997	
Flatley	FFG-21	Short	Bath Iron Works	13 November 1979	15 May 1980	20 June 1981	11 May 1996	Transferred to Turkish Naval Forces as TCG Gemlik (F492), 27 August 1998	
Fahrion	FFG-22	Short	Todd, Seattle	1 December 1978	24 August 1979	16 January 1982	31 March 1998	Transferred to Egyptian Navy as Sharm El-Sheik (F901), 15 March 1998	
Lewis B. Puller	FFG-23	Short	Todd, San Pedro	23 May 1979	15 March 1980	17 April 1982	18 September 1998	Transferred to Egyptian Navy as Toushka (F906), 18 September 1998	
Jack Williams	FFG-24	Short	Bath Iron Works	25 February 1980	30 August 1980	19 September 1981	13 September 1996	Transferred to Royal Bahrain Naval Force as RBNS Sabha (FFG-90), 13 September 1996	
Copeland	FFG-25	Short	Todd, San Pedro	24 October 1979	26 July 1980	7 August 1982	18 September 1996	Transferred to Egyptian Navy as Mubarak (F911), 18 September 1996, renamed Alexandria in 2011	
Gallery	FFG-26	Short	Bath Iron Works	17 May 1980	20 December 1980	5 December 1981	14 June 1996	Transferred to Egyptian Navy as Taba (F916), 25 September 1996	
Mahlon S. Tisdale	FFG-27	Short	Todd, San Pedro	19 March 1980	7 February 1981	27 November 1982	27 September 1996	Transferred to Turkish Naval Forces as TCG Gokceada (F494), 5 April 1999	
Boone	FFG-28	Long	Todd, Seattle	27 March 1979	16 January 1980	15 May 1982	23 February 2012	Disposed, sunk as target, 7 September 2022	
Stephen W. Groves	FFG-29	Long	Bath Iron Works	16 September 1980	4 April 1981	17 April 1982	24 February 2012	Scrapped 2021	
Reid	FFG-30	Short	Todd, San Pedro	8 October 1980	27 June 1981	19 February 1983	25 September 1998	Transferred to Turkish Naval Forces as TCG Gelibolu (F 493), 5 January 1999	
Stark	FFG-31	Short	Todd, Seattle	24 August 1979	30 May 1980	23 October 1982	7 May 1999	Disposed of by scrapping, dismantling, 21 June 2006	
John L. Hall	FFG-32	Long	Bath Iron Works	5 January 1981	24 July 1981	26 June 1982	9 March 2012	Arrived to be scrapped, 19 December 2022	
Jarrett	FFG-33	Long	Todd, San Pedro	11 February 1981	17 October 1981	2 July 1983	26 May 2011	Disposed of by scrapping, dismantling, 1 August 2016	
Aubrey Fitch	FFG-34	Short	Bath Iron Works	10 April 1981	17 October 1981	9 October 1982	12 December 1997	Disposed of by scrapping, dismantling, 19 May 2005	
Built for Royal Australian Navy as HMAS Sydney	FFG-35	Long	Todd, Seattle	16 January 1980	26 September 1980	29 January 1983	7 November 2015	Scrapped 2017	
Underwood	FFG-36	Long	Bath Iron Works	30 July 1981	6 February 1982	29 January 1983	8 March 2013	Towed to be scrapped, dismantled, 27 February 2023	
Crommelin	FFG-37	Long	Todd, Seattle	30 May 1980	2 July 1981	18 June 1983	31 October 2012	Disposed of as target during RIMPAC 2016 SINKEX, 19 July 2016	
Curts	FFG-38	Long	Todd, San Pedro	1 July 1981	6 March 1982	8 October 1983	25 January 2013	Disposed of as target during Valiant Shield 2020 SINKEX, 19 September 2020	
Doyle	FFG-39	Long	Bath Iron Works	23 October 1981	22 May 1982	21 May 1983	29 July 2011	Disposed of by scrapping, dismantling, 12 June 2019	
Halyburton	FFG-40	Long	Todd, Seattle	26 September 1980	13 October 1981	7 January 1984	8 September 2014	Decommissioned, on hold for donation	
McClusky	FFG-41	Long	Todd, San Pedro	21 October 1981	18 September 1982	10 December 1983	14 January 2015	Disposed of as target during RIMPAC 2018 SINKEX, 19 July 2018	
Klakring	FFG-42	Long	Bath Iron Works	19 February 1982	18 September 1982	20 August 1983	22 March 2013	Sunk as target ship in an exercise in 2026	
Thach	FFG-43	Long	Todd, San Pedro	6 March 1981	18 December 1982	17 March 1984	1 November 2013	Disposed of as target during RIMPAC 2016 SINKEX, 14 July 2016	
built for Royal Australian Navy as HMAS Darwin	FFG-44	Long	Todd, Seattle	3 July 1981	26 March 1982	21 July 1984	9 December 2017	Decommissioned 9 December 2017	
De Wert	FFG-45	Long	Bath Iron Works	14 June 1982	18 December 1982	19 November 1983	4 April 2014	Decommissioned, on hold for foreign military sale, 4 April 2014	
Rentz	FFG-46	Long	Todd, San Pedro	18 September 1982	16 July 1983	30 June 1984	23 May 2014	Disposed of as target during Valiant Shield 2016 SINKEX, 13 September 2016	
Nicholas	FFG-47	Long	Bath Iron Works	27 September 1982	23 April 1983	10 March 1984	17 March 2014	Disposed of by scrapping, dismantling, 28 February 2023	
Vandegrift	FFG-48	Long	Todd, Seattle	13 October 1981	15 October 1982	24 November 1984	19 February 2015	Disposed of as target during Valiant Shield 2022 SINKEX, 17 June 2022	
Robert G. Bradley	FFG-49	Long	Bath Iron Works	28 December 1982	13 August 1983	30 June 1984	28 March 2014	Decommissioned on 28 March 2014, to be transferred to Royal Bahrain Naval Force in late 2019.	
Taylor	FFG-50	Long	Bath Iron Works	5 May 1983	5 November 1983	1 December 1984	8 May 2015	Transferred to Taiwan as ROCS Ming-chuan (PFG-1112), 9 March 2016	
Gary	FFG-51	Long	Todd, San Pedro	18 December 1982	19 November 1983	17 November 1984	5 August 2015	Transferred to Taiwan as ROCS Feng Jia (PFG-1115), 9 March 2016	
Carr	FFG-52	Long	Todd, Seattle	26 March 1982	26 February 1983	27 July 1985	13 March 2013	Decommissioned, on hold for foreign military sale, 13 March 2013	
Hawes	FFG-53	Long	Bath Iron Works	26 August 1983	18 February 1984	9 February 1985	10 December 2010	Recycled by 2021	
Ford	FFG-54	Long	Todd, San Pedro	11 July 1983	23 June 1984	29 June 1985	31 October 2013	Disposed of as target during Pacific Griffin 2019 SINKEX, 1 October 2019	
Elrod	FFG-55	Long	Bath Iron Works	21 November 1983	12 May 1984	21 September 1985	30 January 2015	Decommissioned, on hold for foreign military sale, 30 January 2015	
Simpson	FFG-56	Long	Bath Iron Works	27 February 1984	31 August 1984	21 September 1985	29 September 2015	Disposed as a target during UNITAS 2025 SINKEX, September 28, 2025	
Reuben James	FFG-57	Long	Todd, San Pedro	19 November 1983	8 February 1985	22 March 1986	18 July 2013	Disposed of as target during live fire missile test, 19 January 2016	
Samuel B. Roberts	FFG-58	Long	Bath Iron Works	21 May 1984	8 December 1984	12 April 1986	22 May 2015	Disposed of by scrapping, dismantling by 2022	
Kauffman	FFG-59	Long	Bath Iron Works	8 April 1985	29 March 1986	28 February 1987	18 September 2015	Decommissioned, on hold for foreign military sale, 18 September 2015	
Rodney M. Davis	FFG-60	Long	Todd, San Pedro	8 February 1985	11 January 1986	9 May 1987	23 January 2015	Disposed of as target during RIMPAC 2022 SINKEX, 12 July 2022	
Ingraham	FFG-61	Long	Todd, San Pedro	30 March 1987	25 June 1988	5 August 1989	30 January 2015	Disposed of as target during LSE 21 SINKEX, 15 August 2021	

Ship name	Hull No.	Builder	Commission– Decommission	Fate	Link
Australian-built
HMAS Melbourne	FFG 05	Australian Marine Engineering Consolidated (AMECON), Williamstown, Victoria	1992–2019	Decommissioned. Sold to Chile in 2020	
HMAS Newcastle	FFG 06	Australian Marine Engineering Consolidated (AMECON), Williamstown, Victoria	1993–2019	Decommissioned. Sold to Chile in 2020	
Spanish-built
Santa María	F81	Bazan, Ferrol	1986–	In active service	
Victoria	F82	Bazan, Ferrol	1987–	In active service	
Numancia	F83	Bazan, Ferrol	1989–	In active service	
Reina Sofía	F84	Bazan, Ferrol	1990–	In active service	
Navarra	F85	Bazan, Ferrol	1994–	In active service	
Canarias	F86	Bazan, Ferrol	1994–	In active service	
Taiwanese-built (i.e. the Republic of China)
ROCS Cheng Kung	PFG-1101	China Shipbuilding, Kaohsiung, Taiwan	1993–	In active service	
ROCS Cheng Ho	PFG-1103	China Shipbuilding, Kaohsiung, Taiwan	1994–	In active service	
ROCS Chi Kuang	PFG-1105	China Shipbuilding, Kaohsiung, Taiwan	1995–	In active service	
ROCS Yueh Fei	PFG-1106	China Shipbuilding, Kaohsiung, Taiwan	1996–	In active service	
ROCS Tzu I	PFG-1107	China Shipbuilding, Kaohsiung, Taiwan	1997–	In active service	
ROCS Pan Chao	PFG-1108	China Shipbuilding, Kaohsiung, Taiwan	1997–	In active service	
ROCS Chang Chien	PFG-1109	China Shipbuilding, Kaohsiung, Taiwan	1998–	In active service	
ROCS Tian Dan	PFG-1110	China Shipbuilding, Kaohsiung, Taiwan	2004–	In active service	

== Related legislation ==
The Naval Vessel Transfer Act of 2013 authorized the transfer of Curts and McClusky to Mexico, and the sale of Taylor, Gary, Carr, and Elrod to the Taipei Economic and Cultural Representative Office in the United States (which is the Taiwan agency designated under the Taiwan Relations Act) for about $10 million each.

== Considered for reactivation ==
On 13 June 2017, Chief of Naval Operations Admiral John M. Richardson said the Navy was looking into the possibility of recommissioning several Oliver Hazard Perry-class frigates from its inactive fleet to support President Donald Trump's proposed 355-ship navy plan. On 11 December 2017, the Navy decided against reactivating the class, saying it would cost too much.

As of 4 September 2026, the decommissioned but extant Oliver Hazard Perry-class frigates, kept at the Naval Inactive Ship Maintenance Facility in Philadelphia, Pennsylvania, were:

- USS Halyburton (FFG-40)
- USS De Wert (FFG-45)
- USS Carr (FFG-52)
- USS Elrod (FFG-55)
- USS Kauffman (FFG-59)

== See also ==
- List of frigates of the United States Navy § Oliver Hazard Perry-class FFG
- List of frigate classes in service
- List of frigate classes by country

Equivalent frigates of the same era

- Tromp class
- Type 22
- Tourville class
- Baleares class
- Suffren class
