= USS Estocin =

1979 Oliver Hazard Perry-class frigate

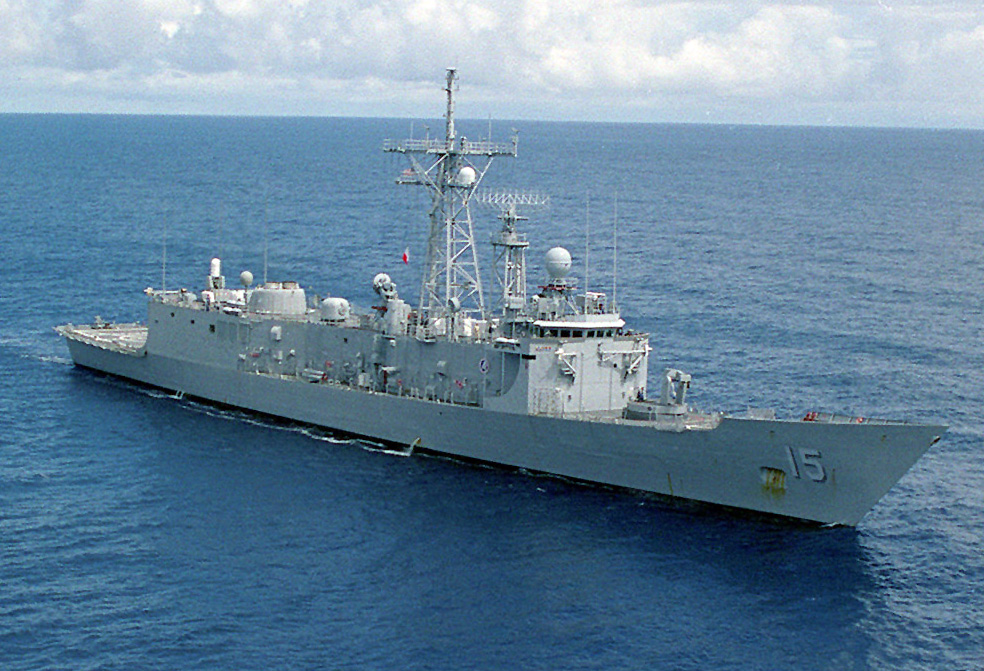
- USS Estocin underway in the Caribbean Sea

History

United States
- Name: USS Estocin
- Namesake: Michael John Estocin (1931–1967)
- Ordered: 27 February 1976
- Builder: Bath Iron Works, Bath, Maine
- Laid down: 2 April 1979
- Launched: 3 November 1979
- Sponsored by: Mrs Quay Marie (Hampton) Estocin
- Commissioned: 10 January 1981
- Decommissioned: 3 April 2003
- Stricken: 3 April 2003
- Home port: Norfolk, Virginia (former)
- Identification: Hull symbol:FFG-15; Code letters:NMJE
- Motto: "Courage, Honor, Tenacity"
- Fate: Disposed of through the Security Assistance Program (SAP)
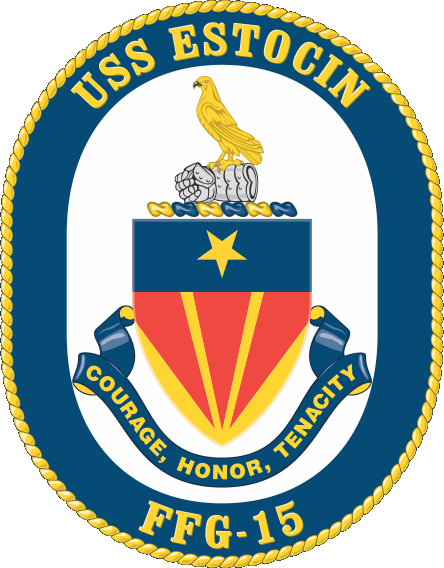
- Badge

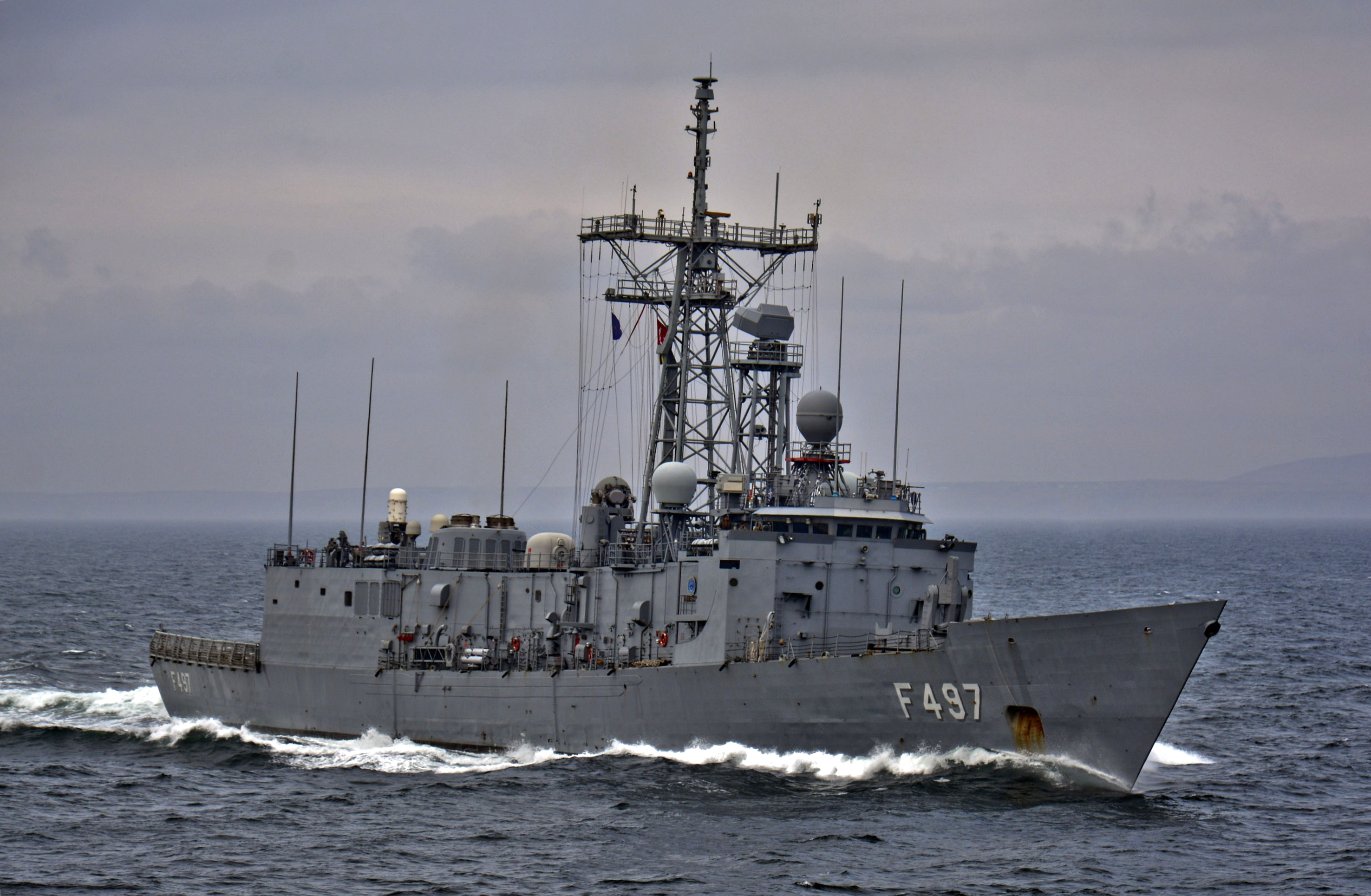
- TCG Göksu (F 497) in April 2015.

Turkey
- Name: Göksu
- Namesake: The river Göksu
- Acquired: 3 April 2003
- Identification: F 497
- Status: in active service

General characteristics
- Class & type: Oliver Hazard Perry-class frigate
- Displacement: 4,100 long tons (4,200 t), full load
- Length: 445 feet (136 m), overall
- Beam: 45 feet (14 m)
- Draught: 22 feet (6.7 m)
- Propulsion: 2 × General Electric LM2500-30 gas turbines generating 41,000 shp (31 MW) through a single shaft and variable pitch propeller; 2 × Auxiliary Propulsion Units, 350 hp (260 kW) retractable electric azimuth thrusters for maneuvering and docking.
- Speed: over 29 knots (54 km/h)
- Range: 5,000 nautical miles at 18 knots (9,300 km at 33 km/h)
- Complement: 15 officers and 190 enlisted, plus SH-60 LAMPS detachment of roughly six officer pilots and 15 enlisted maintainers
- Sensors & processing systems: AN/SPS-49 air-search radar; AN/SPS-55 surface-search radar; CAS and STIR fire-control radar; AN/SQS-56 sonar.
- Electronic warfare & decoys: AN/SLQ-32
- Armament: As built: 1 × OTO Melara Mk 75 76 mm/62 caliber naval gun; 2 × Mk 32 triple-tube (324 mm) launchers for Mark 46 torpedoes; 1 × Vulcan Phalanx CIWS; 4 × .50-cal (12.7 mm) machine guns.; 1 × Mk 13 Mod 4 single-arm launcher for Harpoon anti-ship missiles and SM-1MR Standard anti-ship/air missiles (40 round magazine); Note: As of 2004, Mk 13 systems removed from all active US vessels of this class.; G-Class Frigate: 1 × Mk 15 Phalanx CIWS; 1 × Oto Melara 76mm DP gun; 8 × Harpoon SSM; 40 × SM-1 MR SAM; 32 × ESSM launched from Mk-41 VLS (4 ESSM missiles per MK-41 cell through the use of MK25 Quadpack canisters, total of 8 cells); Two triple Mark 32 Anti-submarine warfare torpedo tubes with Mark 46 or Mark 50 anti-submarine warfare torpedoes
- Aircraft carried: 1 × SH-2F LAMPS I

USS Estocin (FFG-15), ninth ship of the Oliver Hazard Perry class of guided-missile frigates, was named for Captain Michael John Estocin (1931–1967). Ordered from Bath Iron Works on 27 February 1976 as part of the FY76 program, Estocin was laid down on 2 April 1979, launched on 3 November 1979, and commissioned on 10 January 1981.

Estocin (FFG-15) was the first ship of that name in the US Navy. The ship's motto, listed on her crest, was "Courage, Honor, Tenacity".

== History ==
Estocin was sponsored by Michael John Estocin's widow, Mrs Quay Marie (Hampton) Estocin. Their three daughters served as maids of honor at the ceremonial launching and christening.

=== 1980s ===
After her commissioning, Estocin was assigned to Destroyer Squadron Eight, homeported in Mayport, Florida. While there, she made deployments to the Mediterranean, the Indian Ocean, and participated in Special Operations off the Central American coast.

Estocin and her crew were awarded the Navy Expeditionary Medal for operations near Lebanon between 10 October and 10 November 1982. See also Multinational Force in Lebanon.

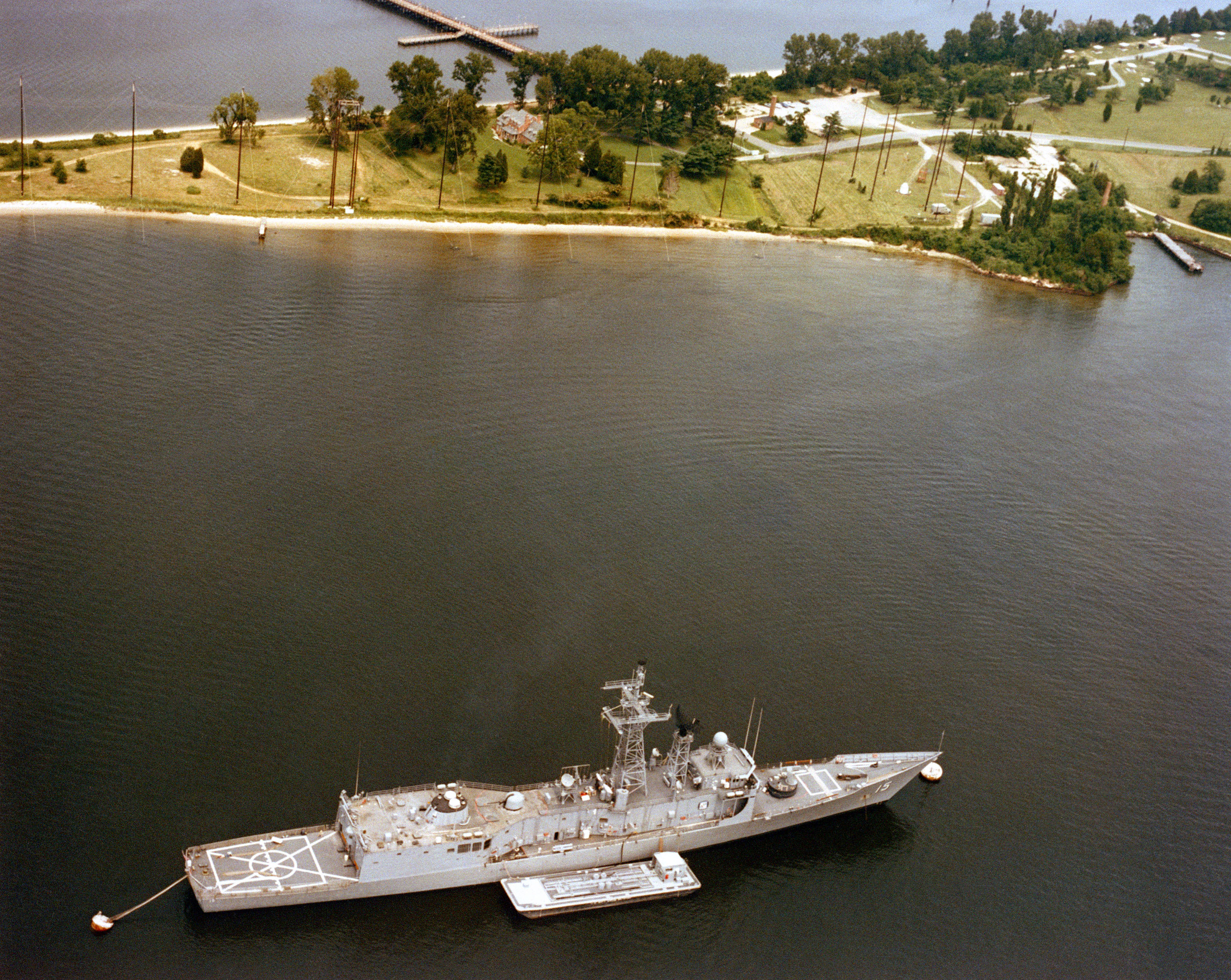
Estocin moored near EMPRESS I EMP test facility, Point Patience, Maryland, October 1985.

15 October 1985 Estocin ran aground near Key West, Florida.

Throughout 1986, Estocin served as the Navy's testbed for the Mk-92 Fire Control System improvement project (CORT). The Mk-92 "CORT" program was a CNO Priority-1 Project, one of the only four in the entire Navy at that time. These tests had Estocin tracking and engaging a variety of surface and air targets. Fifteen SM-1 medium range missiles and nearly 1000 rounds of 76mm ammunition were fired in the course of the test cycle. By the end of 1986, Estocin had logged nearly 15,000 underway miles in support of this project. Estocin and her crew were awarded a Secretary of the Navy Letter of Commendation for operations between January and November, 1986.

On 1 October 1986, Estocin officially became part of the Naval Reserve Force (NRF) reported to Naval Surface Warfare Group Four, homeported in Philadelphia, PA. Upon joining the NRF, Estocin operated primarily in the western Atlantic in support of Naval Reserve Training (NRT) and active fleet commitments. She logged frequent underway weekends devoted entirely to Selected Reserve crew training, as well as periodic underway periods of 2-week duration to enable reservists to complete their active duty training requirements. These operations took Estocin as far north as Nova Scotia and south to the Caribbean.

Estocin and her crew were awarded a United States Coast Guard Special Operations Service Ribbon for operations July to September, 1989.

=== 1990s ===
Estocin was chosen to conduct a Great Lakes Cruise in 1991 in support of U.S. Navy recruiting efforts and to promote public awareness in America's heartland, through port calls to U.S. and Canadian cities on the Great Lakes. In the fall of 1991 and the spring of 1992, Estocin participated in Canadian Fleet Operations conducted with U.S. Navy and Canadian Maritime Command units in the area south of Nova Scotia.

Estocin and her crew were awarded a Battle Effectiveness Award for operations in 1992.

On 17 August 1992, Estocin changed homeport to Newport, RI. Estocin completed Maritime Interdiction Operations in the Caribbean and in December 1993 operated off the coast of Haiti during Operation Support Democracy. In January 1994, Estocin again changed her homeport moving to Naval Base, Norfolk, VA. Estocin was again selected for a Great Lakes Cruise in the summer of 1994. Upon completion of this cruise, she underwent a four-month drydock period to inspect and overhaul numerous shipboard systems. After completion of this drydocking, Estocin was sent in the fall of 1995 to the Caribbean in support of Counter Drug Operations. During this cruise, Estocin transited the Panama Canal to conduct Counter Drug Operations in the eastern Pacific as well.

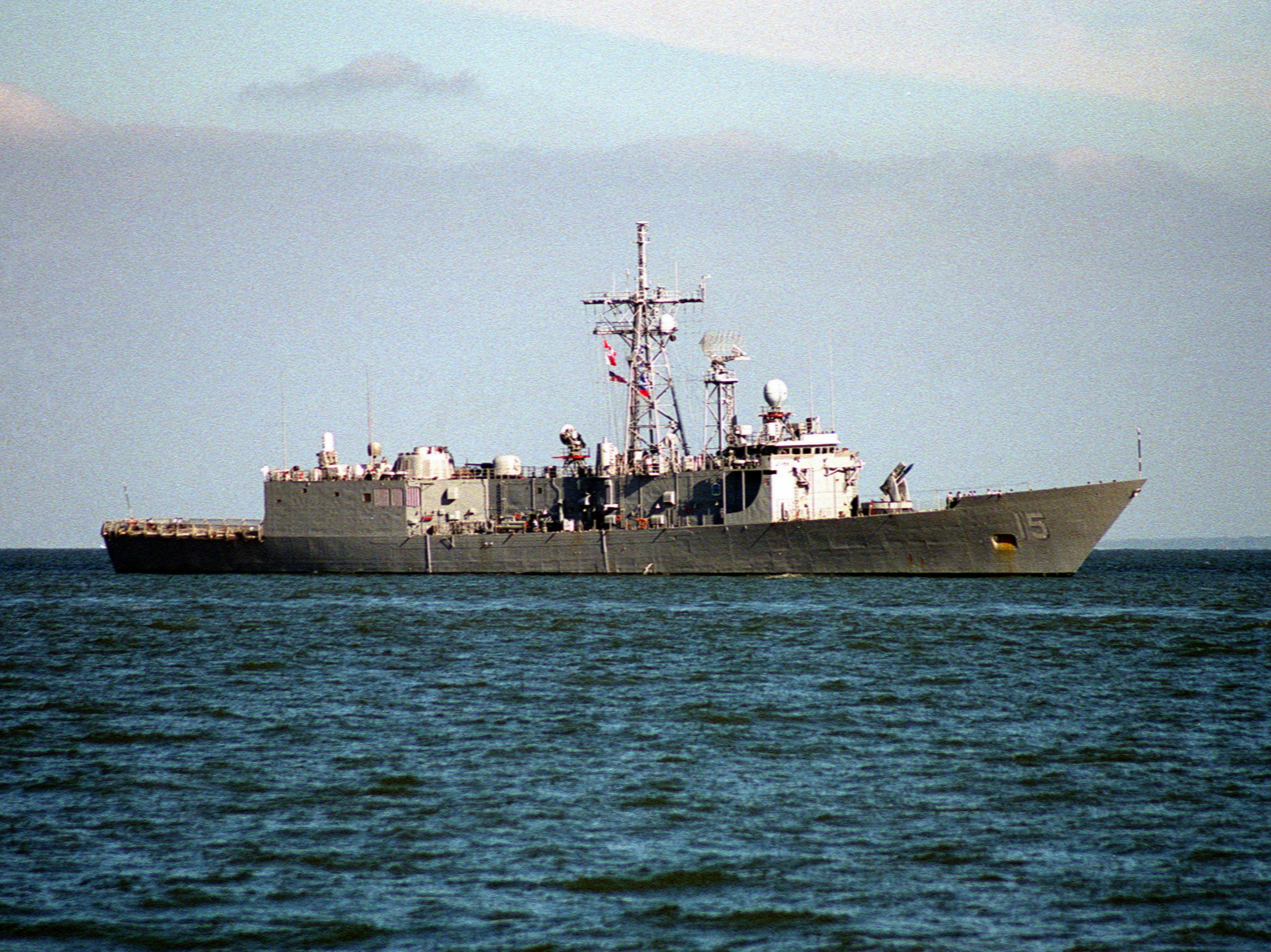
Estocin entering Hampton Roads, returning following Hurricane Felix, 1995.

In 1996, after completing a work-up cycle, which included re-certification of her propulsion plant and cruise missile tactical qualification, Estocin deployed with Destroyer Squadron Eighteen in support of Operation Northern Light-Bright Horizon 96. During this fast-paced month and a half commitment, Estocin participated in a variety of maneuvering and training exercises with over 53 ships and submarines from 13 European nations. Upon her return to Norfolk, Estocin entered an availability period to prepare ship's systems for her next commitment, Joint Task Force Exercise 97-1 (JTFEX 97–1). During this exercise Estocin was the flagship for the Opposing Forces (OPFOR), whose mission was to train the deploying carrier battle group. Although composed of U.S. ships, the OPFOR simulated a variety of patrol boats found throughout the world. Successfully training the battle group, Estocin prepared for her next deployment.

Assigned to Cruiser Destroyer Group Eight, Estocin deployed for Baltic Operations 97 (BALTOPS 97) in May 1997. The deployment entailed at-sea operations with ships from NATO countries as well as non-NATO countries such as Russia, Poland and Lithuania. BALTOPS 97 also included goodwill visits to former Eastern-Bloc nations. During this deployment, Estocin had the unique opportunity to become the first U.S. warship to visit two Russian ports in the same deployment, with stops in Baltiysk and Severomorsk, Russia. In addition, Estocin had the distinct privilege of hosting the Admirals of the Russian Baltic and Northern Fleets during her port calls.

January 1999 found Estocin deploying for the Caribbean. Once again in support of Counter Drug Operations, Estocin set the standard in curbing the flow of drugs into the United States. After four and a half months in the Caribbean, including a cocaine seizure of over 400 kg (880 lb), Estocin returned home on 15 May.

Estocin was underway once again at the end of June 1999 to participate in INDEX 99-2 with the USS John F. Kennedy Battle Group. During this exercise, Estocin simulated Opposing Forces during Harpoon, Anti Air Warfare, and Anti Submarine Warfare exercises. Estocin proved her battle readiness in all areas as she conducted multiple PACFIRES with her 76mm gun, launched two Mk 46 Torpedoes and fired three successful SM-1 engagements. After achieving her best battle readiness condition in over four years, Estocin returned to Norfolk in July to conduct a nine-week Restricted Availability (RAV).

After this maintenance period and successful training cycle workups, Estocin sailed late November 1999 to support preparing the USS Dwight D. Eisenhower Battle Group for deployment as an Opposition Force in JTFEX 00-1. She also participated in INDEX 99-3, which allowed training in all warfare areas for the crew. At the completion of the JTFEX, Estocin was chosen by Commander, Second Fleet to perform a bilateral exercise with two French Navy ships, the French cruiser Jeanne d'Arc and frigate Georges Leygues. This exercise provided valuable training for the midshipmen embarked on Jeanne d'Arc and helped to further strengthen the strong Naval ties with this NATO ally.

=== 2000s and decommissioning ===
As of 2000, Estocin was in homeport, Norfolk, VA, preparing for upcoming exercises including: a group sail under the command of Commander, Destroyer Squadron Fourteen; a UNITAS exercise with ships from the Venezuelan, Colombian, and U.S. navies; and participation with Brazilian and other nation naval units in honor of the 500th anniversary of the founding of Brazil in April 2000.

Estocin and her crew were awarded a Battle Effectiveness Award for operations in 2000.

On 14 May 2001, Estocin returned to homeport in Norfolk, Virginia after a five-month deployment to the Caribbean, including again Operation UNITAS.

Estocin and USS Samuel Eliot Morison swapped crews in late February 2002 (with one junior officer deemed crucial to Estocin's operation to transfer that remained with that Estocin through the crew swap). Both frigates were scheduled to decommission in 2002, but following 11 September 2001, Navy leadership decided it might be advantageous to retain one of the two short hulled frigates. Estocin had already reduced crew size nearly 40% preparing to decommission in support of a planned ship transfer to the Republic of Turkey that had been already approved by Congress. Yet, she was the more recently modernized of the two frigates which was why the Republic of Turkey was interested in that Foreign Military Sale (FMS). The U.S. changed the FMS offer to Turkey with the Former Samuel Eliot Morison at a reduced price to the original FMS offer of Estocin. Former Samuel Eliot Morison sailors were then transferred to serve on Estocin and their ship was decommissioned 11 April 2002 with the former Estocin skeleton crew. Estocin was decommissioned at Mayport and stricken a year later on 3 April 2003. She was the last short-hulled FFG operational with the US Navy.

== TCG Göksu (F 497) ==
On 3 April 2003, Estocin was decommissioned, stricken from the Navy list and transferred to Turkey as that nation's TCG Göksu (F 497). As of 2022, she is still in active service.

== See also ==
- RADM David M. Thomas Jr., former engineering officer, USS Estocin (FFG-15)
