= USS Reid (FFG-30) =

Oliver Hazard Perry-class frigate

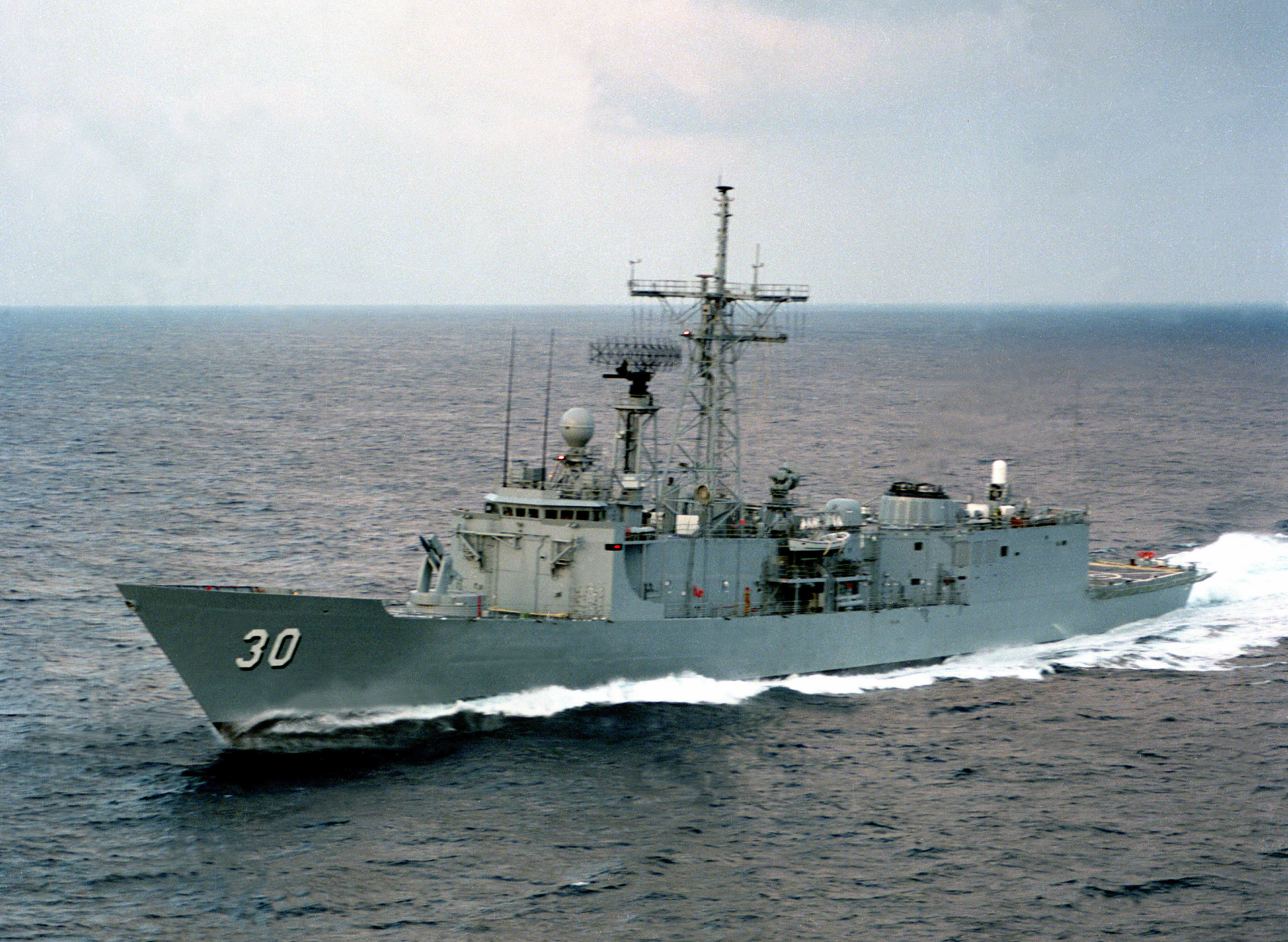
- USS Reid (FFG-30)

History

United States
- Name: Reid
- Namesake: Sailing Master Samuel Chester Reid
- Awarded: 23 January 1978
- Builder: Todd Pacific Shipyards, Los Angeles Division, San Pedro, CA
- Laid down: 8 October 1980
- Launched: 27 June 1981
- Sponsored by: Mrs. William C. Abhau, her daughter Miss Elliot Abhau assisting.
- Commissioned: 19 February 1983
- Decommissioned: 25 September 1998
- Stricken: 25 September 1998
- Identification: Hull symbol:FFG-30; Code letters:NSCR
- Motto: "Pride – Distinction – Honor"
- Nickname(s): Reidski
- Fate: Transferred to Turkey, 5 January 1999
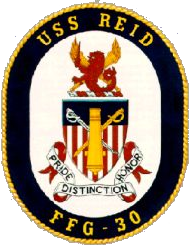
- Badge

- TCG Gelibolu (F-493)

Turkey
- Name: Gelibolu
- Namesake: District of Gelibolu
- Acquired: 5 January 1999
- Identification: Hull number: F493; MMSI number: 271035056; Callsign: TBOH
- Status: in active service

General characteristics
- Class & type: Oliver Hazard Perry-class
- Displacement: 4,100 long tons (4,200 t), full load
- Length: 445 feet (136 m), overall
- Beam: 45 feet (14 m)
- Draught: 22 feet (6.7 m)
- Propulsion: 2 × General Electric LM2500-30 gas turbines generating 41,000 shp (31 MW) through a single shaft and variable pitch propeller; 2 × Auxiliary Propulsion Units, 350 hp (260 kW) retractable electric azimuth thrusters for maneuvering and docking.
- Speed: over 29 knots (54 km/h)
- Range: 5,000 nautical miles at 18 knots (9,300 km at 33 km/h)
- Complement: 15 officers and 190 enlisted, plus SH-60 LAMPS detachment of roughly six officer pilots and 15 enlisted maintainers
- Sensors & processing systems: AN/SPS-49 air-search radar; AN/SPS-55 surface-search radar; CAS and STIR fire-control radar; AN/SQS-56 sonar.
- Electronic warfare & decoys: AN/SLQ-32
- Armament: As built: 1 × OTO Melara Mk 75 76 mm/62 caliber naval gun; 2 × Mk 32 triple-tube (324 mm) launchers for Mark 46 torpedoes; 1 × Vulcan Phalanx CIWS; 4 × .50-cal (12.7 mm) machine guns.; 1 × Mk 13 Mod 4 single-arm launcher for Harpoon anti-ship missiles and SM-1MR Standard anti-ship/air missiles (40 round magazine); Note: As of 2004, Mk 13 systems removed from all active US vessels of this class.; G-Class Frigate: 1 × Mk 15 Phalanx CIWS; 1 × Oto Melara 76mm DP gun; 8 × Harpoon SSM; 40 × SM-1 MR SAM; 32 × ESSM launched from Mk-41 VLS (4 ESSM missiles per MK-41 cell through the use of MK25 Quadpack canisters, total of 8 cells); Two triple Mark 32 Anti-submarine warfare torpedo tubes with Mark 46 or Mark 50 anti-submarine warfare torpedoes
- Aircraft carried: 1 × SH-2F LAMPS I

USS Reid (FFG-30), twenty-second ship of the Oliver Hazard Perry-class of guided-missile frigates, was named for Sailing Master Samuel Chester Reid (1783–1861).

Ordered from Todd Pacific Shipyards, Los Angeles Division, San Pedro, California on 23 January 1978 as part of the FY78 program, Reid was laid down on 8 October 1980, launched on 27 June 1981, sponsored by Mrs. William C. Abhau, her daughter Miss Elliot Abhau assisting, Mrs. Abhau is the great-great-granddaughter of Sailing Master Chester Reid, and commissioned on 19 February 1983.

On 18 August 1990, Reid fired the first shots of Operation Desert Shield when she fired across the bow of an Iraqi tanker who had refused to change course when ordered.

The Reid's unofficial nickname Reidski, used during the 1980s, came into use as Reid found herself, more often than not, playing on the side of the "orange" team during fleet exercises.

== TCG Gelibolu (F 493) ==
Decommissioned & stricken on 25 September 1998, she was transferred to Turkey on 5 January 1999 as that nation's TCG Gelibolu (F 493). As of 2023, she is still in active service.
