= USS Duncan (FFG-10) =

Oliver Hazard Perry-class frigate

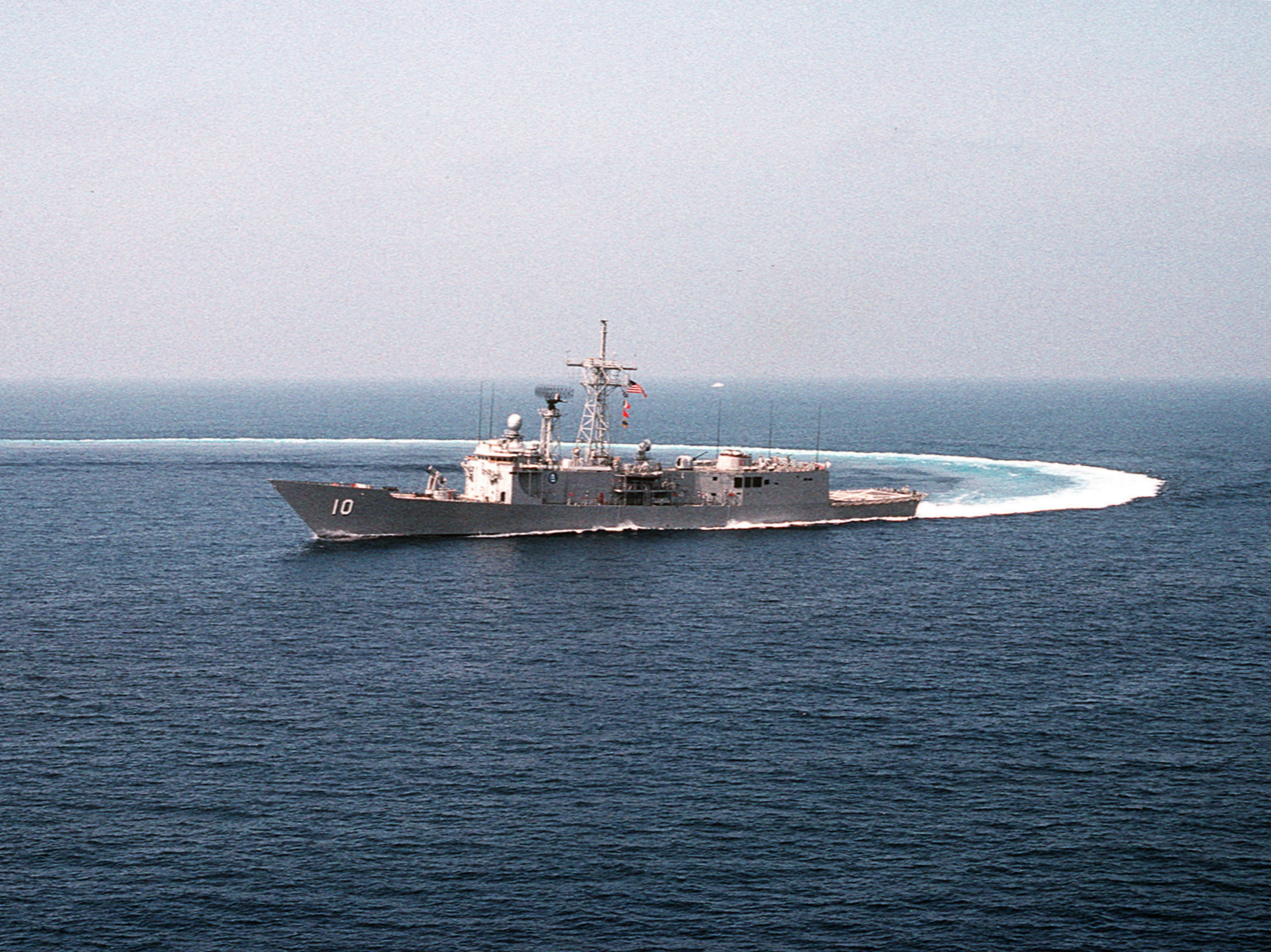
- USS Duncan (FFG-10) comes about near San Diego, 1986.

History

United States
- Name: Duncan
- Namesake: Vice Admiral Donald B. Duncan
- Ordered: 27 February 1976
- Builder: Todd Pacific Shipyards, Seattle, WA
- Laid down: 29 April 1977
- Launched: 1 March 1978
- Sponsored by: Mrs. Aniela Mateja Duncan
- Commissioned: 15 May 1980
- Decommissioned: 17 December 1994
- Stricken: 5 January 1998
- Home port: Long Beach, California (former)
- Identification: Hull symbol:FFG-10; Code letters:NDBD
- Motto: "Vigilant and Swift"; "Virtus Velox"
- Fate: Disposed of through the Security Assistance Program (SAP) as a parts hulk, 5 April 1999
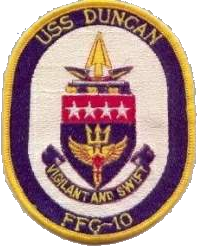
- Badge

General characteristics
- Class & type: Oliver Hazard Perry-class frigate
- Displacement: 4,100 long tons (4,200 t), full load
- Length: 445 feet (136 m), overall
- Beam: 45 feet (14 m)
- Draught: 22 feet (6.7 m)
- Propulsion: 2 × General Electric LM2500-30 gas turbines generating 41,000 shp (31 MW) through a single shaft and variable pitch propeller; 2 × Auxiliary Propulsion Units, 350 hp (260 kW) retractable electric azimuth thrusters for maneuvering and docking.
- Speed: over 29 knots (54 km/h)
- Range: 5,000 nautical miles at 18 knots (9,300 km at 33 km/h)
- Complement: 15 officers and 190 enlisted, plus SH-60 LAMPS detachment of roughly six officer pilots and 15 enlisted maintainers
- Sensors & processing systems: AN/SPS-49 air-search radar; AN/SPS-55 surface-search radar; CAS and STIR fire-control radar; AN/SQS-56 sonar.
- Electronic warfare & decoys: AN/SLQ-32
- Armament: As built: 1 × OTO Melara Mk 75 76 mm/62 caliber naval gun; 2 × Mk 32 triple-tube (324 mm) launchers for Mark 46 torpedoes; 4 × .50-cal (12.7 mm) machine guns.; 1 × Mk 13 Mod 4 single-arm launcher for Harpoon anti-ship missiles and SM-1MR Standard anti-ship/air missiles (40 round magazine); 1 × Vulcan Phalanx CIWS (added 1989-1994)
- Aircraft carried: 1 × SH-2F Seasprite helicopter

The USS Duncan (FFG-10) was the fourth ship of the Oliver Hazard Perry-class of guided-missile frigates, and was named for Vice Admiral Donald B. Duncan (1896–1975). Ordered from Todd Pacific, Seattle, Washington on 27 February 1976 as part of the FY75 program, Duncan was laid down on 29 April 1977, launched on 1 March 1978, and commissioned on 15 May 1980.

== History ==
Duncan, former PF-111, was sponsored by Mrs. Aniela Mateja Duncan, widow of the ship's namesake.

In December 1982, Duncan developed a 40 feet (12 m) fissure in her superstructure during a storm. It was a class design deficiency that occurred on other frigates.

In January 1984, Duncan was transferred to the United States Navy Reserve Fleet and Selected Reserve (SELRES) members provided for a portion of the ship's manning.

Duncan and her crew were awarded the Battle Effectiveness Award five times for 18-month time periods ranging from July 1981 to June 1983 and July 1986 to December 1990.

Duncan participated in Port of Hueneme Harbor Days in October 1992.

In March 1993, sailors aboard Duncan rescued four fisherman from Ecuador who were stranded on their disabled fishing boat in the Pacific Ocean. Duncan towed their boat to safety in Manta, Ecuador. Duncan and her crew were nominated for the Humanitarian Service Medal in March 1993, but no unit award was given.

=== 1992 Sitka port visit ===
Duncan participated in Sitka, Alaska's 125th anniversary Alaska Day celebration, 18 October 1992. The port visit became notorious following allegations of sexual misconduct with minors by crew members and the event's relative proximity to the Tailhook scandal and subsequent investigation. After Duncan was decommissioned, the story re-appeared in national media in 1996, following investigative reporting by the Dayton Daily News' Russell Carollo, due to complaints that the Navy didn't adequately punish the sailors involved. A grand jury in Sitka indicted two Duncan sailors on sexual assault charges, but the cases were dismissed in January 1997 due to prosecutorial delay and the Judge's determination that the two had already been tried by the Navy. A 22-year-old Ensign had faced court martial but pleaded down to a letter of reprimand. Later, he also received an other than honorable discharge. The second sailor, a 23-year-old enlisted man, also faced court martial, but his charges were dropped by the court's presiding officer.

=== Decommissioning ===
Duncan was decommissioned on 17 December 1994 & stricken on 5 January 1998, then Duncan was sold to Turkey on 5 April 1999 for use as a parts hulk. She was the first Perry-class frigate to be decommissioned, in commission for just 14.6 years. At the time, the Soviet Union had recently collapsed, and Duncan was one of the oldest, unmodified, short hulled frigates in the fleet. She lacked some of the options others in her class had been modified with. For example, as a short hull ship, she did not have SH-60 Seahawk capability or a RAST to haul down the helicopter & transport it into the hangar. She also lacked a towed array sonar (TACTAS) and the MK-92 COherent Receiver Transmitter (CORT) modification. On 4 October 2017, ex-Duncan was scuttled by the submarine TCG Sakarya on the Black Sea.
