= USS Samuel Eliot Morison =

American/Turkish military naval vessel

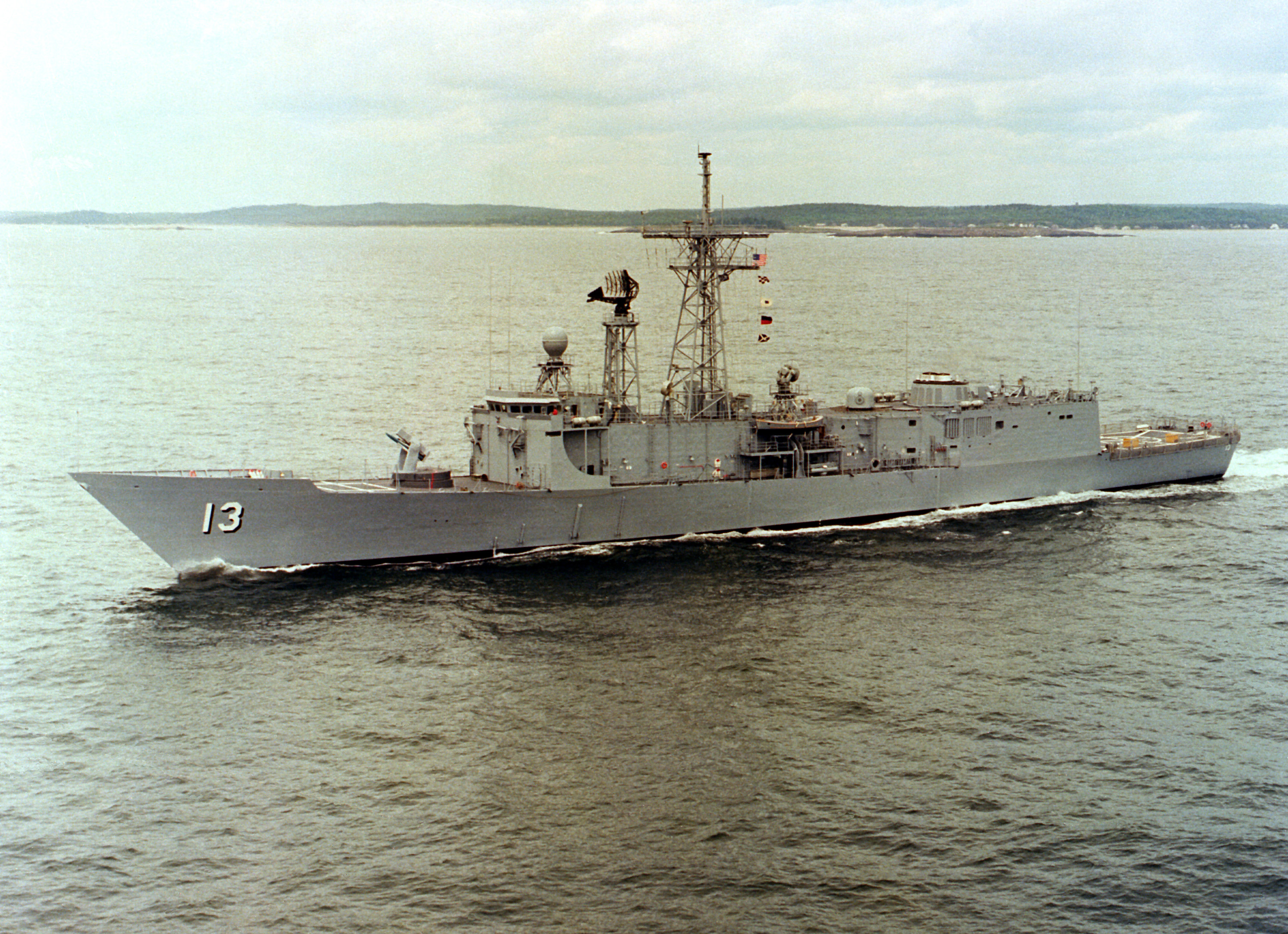
- USS Samuel Eliot Morison during sea trials in 1980

History

United States
- Name: USS Samuel Eliot Morison
- Namesake: Rear Admiral Samuel Eliot Morison
- Ordered: 27 February 1976
- Builder: Bath Iron Works, Bath, Maine
- Laid down: 4 December 1978
- Launched: 14 July 1979
- Commissioned: 11 October 1980
- Decommissioned: 10 April 2002
- Stricken: 23 July 2002
- Home port: Naval Station Mayport; Charleston Naval Shipyard (Assigned 30 June 1986)
- Identification: Hull symbol:FFG-13; Code letters:NSEM
- Motto: "The Past is Prologue"
- Fate: Sold to Turkey on 11 April 2002
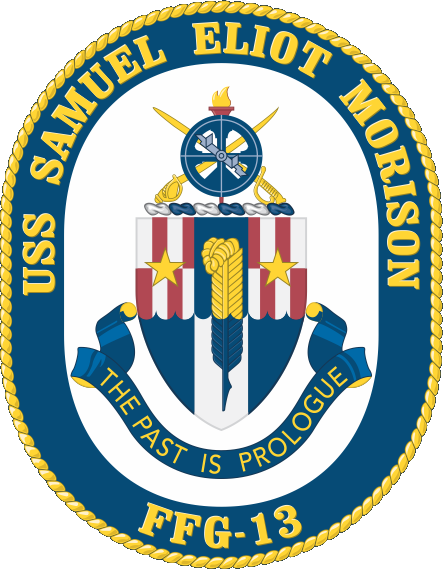
- Badge

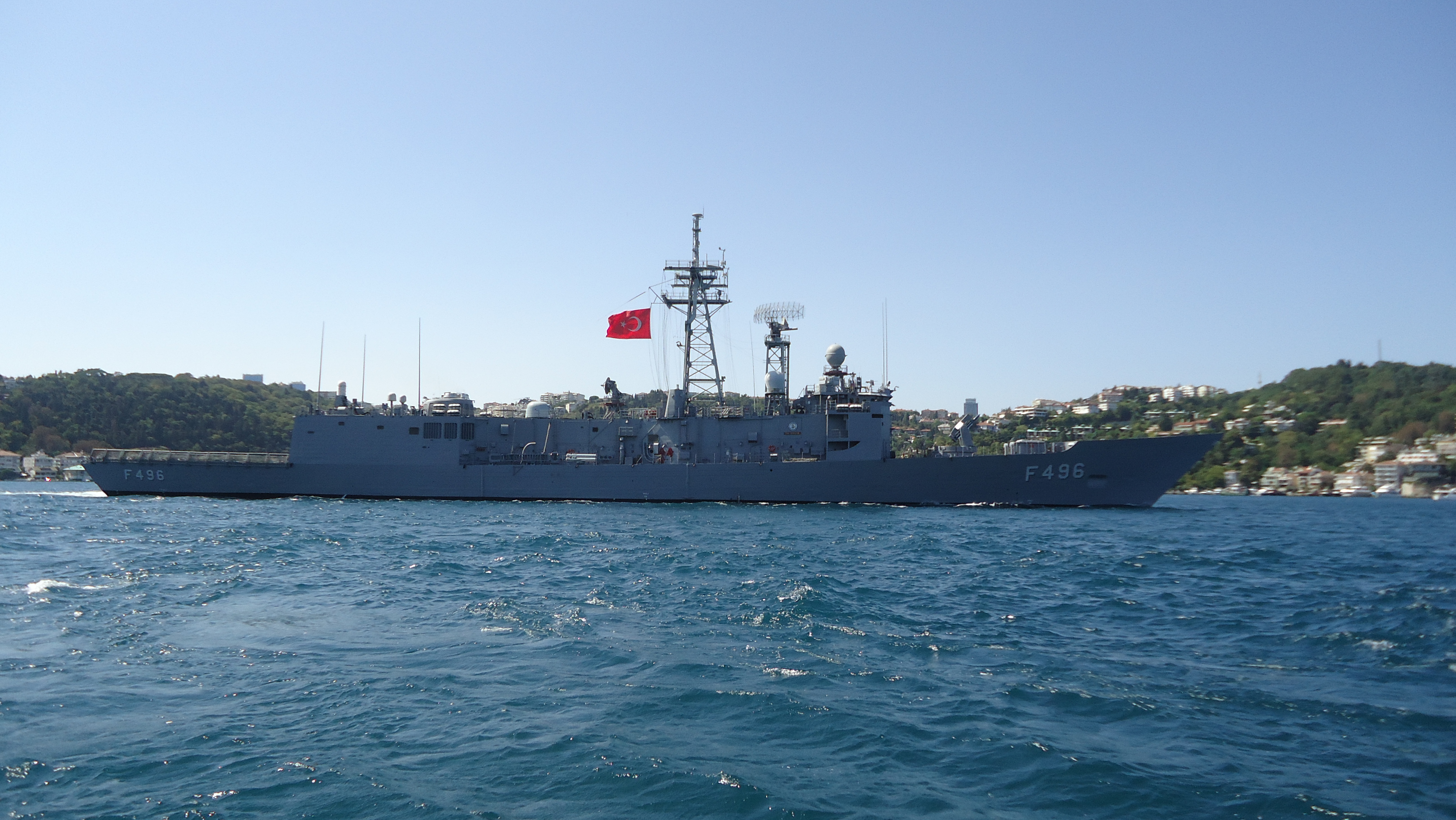
- Turkish TCG Gökova

Turkey
- Name: Gökova
- Namesake: Municipality of Gökova
- Acquired: 11 April 2002
- Identification: F 496
- Status: in active service

General characteristics
- Class & type: Oliver Hazard Perry-class frigate
- Displacement: 4,100 long tons (4,200 t), full load
- Length: 445 feet (136 m), overall
- Beam: 45 feet (14 m)
- Draft: 22 feet (6.7 m)
- Propulsion: 2 × General Electric LM2500-30 gas turbines generating 41,000 shp (31 MW) through a single shaft and variable pitch propeller; 2 × Auxiliary Propulsion Units, 350 hp (260 kW) retractable electric azimuth thrusters for maneuvering and docking.
- Speed: over 29 knots (54 km/h)
- Range: 5,000 nautical miles at 18 knots (9,300 km at 33 km/h)
- Complement: 15 officers and 190 enlisted, plus SH-60 LAMPS detachment of roughly six officer pilots and 15 enlisted maintainers
- Sensors & processing systems: AN/SPS-49 air-search radar; AN/SPS-55 surface-search radar; CAS and STIR fire-control radar; AN/SQS-56 sonar.
- Electronic warfare & decoys: AN/SLQ-32
- Armament: As built: 1 × OTO Melara Mk 75 76 mm/62 caliber naval gun; 2 × Mk 32 triple-tube (324 mm) launchers for Mark 46 torpedoes; 1 × Vulcan Phalanx CIWS; 4 × .50-cal (12.7 mm) machine guns.; 1 × Mk 13 Mod 4 single-arm launcher for Harpoon anti-ship missiles and SM-1MR Standard anti-ship/air missiles (40 round magazine); Note: As of 2004, Mk 13 systems removed from all active US vessels of this class.; G-Class Frigate: 1 × Mk 15 Phalanx CIWS; 1 × Oto Melara 76mm DP gun; 8 × Harpoon SSM; 40 × SM-1 MR SAM; 32 × ESSM launched from Mk-41 VLS (4 ESSM missiles per MK-41 cell through the use of MK25 Quadpack canisters, total of 8 cells); Two triple Mark 32 Anti-submarine warfare torpedo tubes with Mark 46 or Mark 50 anti-submarine warfare torpedoes
- Aircraft carried: 1 × SH-2F LAMPS I But may have never been modified to carry LAMPS (ie "poop deck")Lack of funding for NRF ships.
- Aviation facilities: Hangar Bay, Helicopter Deck

USS Samuel Eliot Morison (FFG-13), was the seventh Oliver Hazard Perry-class frigate in service with the United States Navy. She was named for Rear Admiral Samuel Eliot Morison (1887–1976), one of America's most distinguished naval historians, who wrote more than 40 books on naval history including the official history of the US Navy in World War II.

Samuel Eliot Morison was the first ship of that name in the U.S. Navy.

== TCG Gökova (F 496) ==
On 11 April 2002, Samuel Eliot Morison was decommissioned and transferred to Turkey, where she was renamed as TCG Gökova (F 496) and joined the other Oliver Hazard Perry-class vessels acquired by the Turkish Navy as G-class frigates.

In 2013, she contributed to Operation Ocean Shield with other NATO Forces Ships in the Gulf of Aden.

As of 2019, she is still in active service.

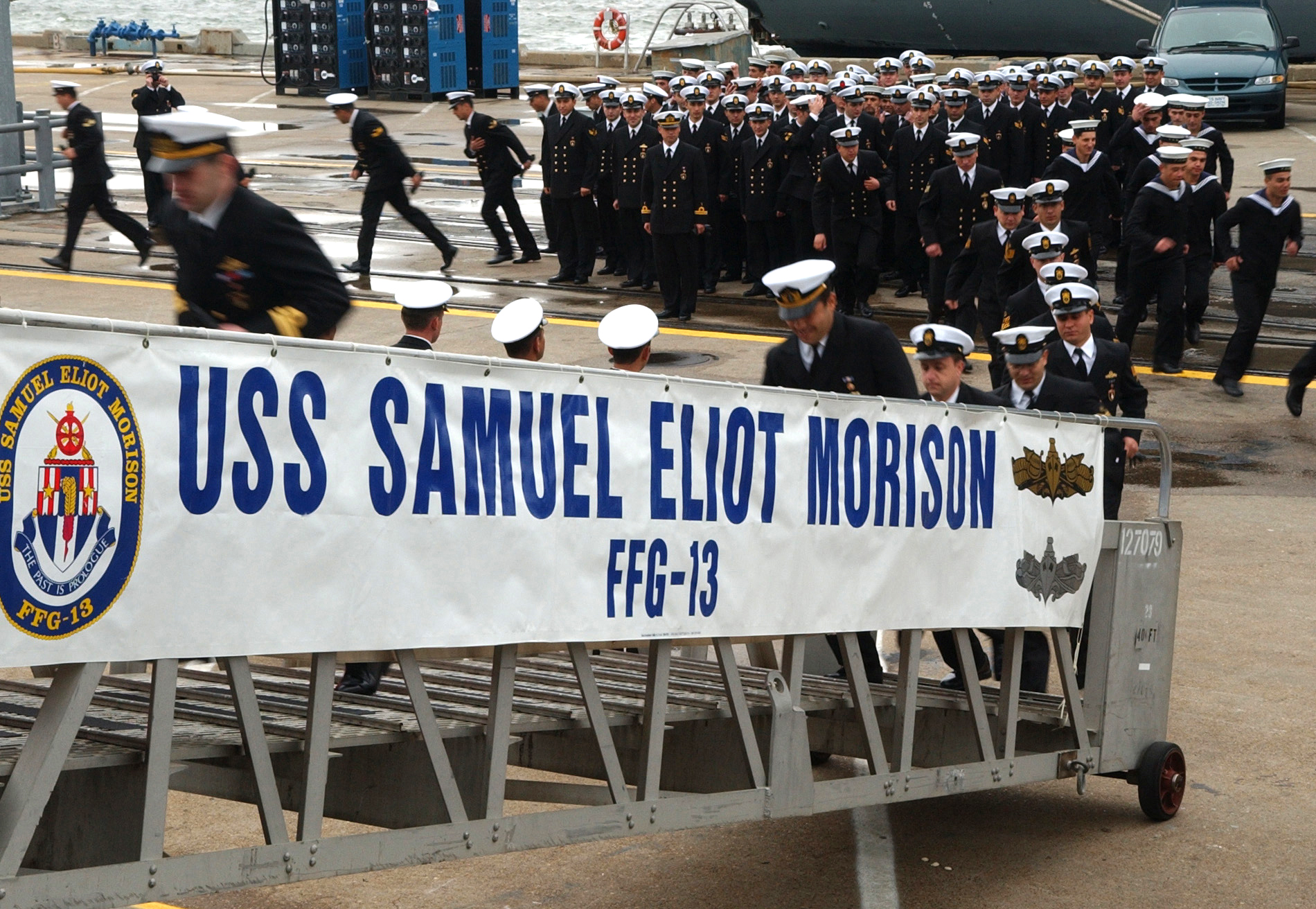
USS Samuel Eliot Morison (FFG-13)
