= Spanish frigate Numancia =

Spanish Navy frigate commissioned in 1989

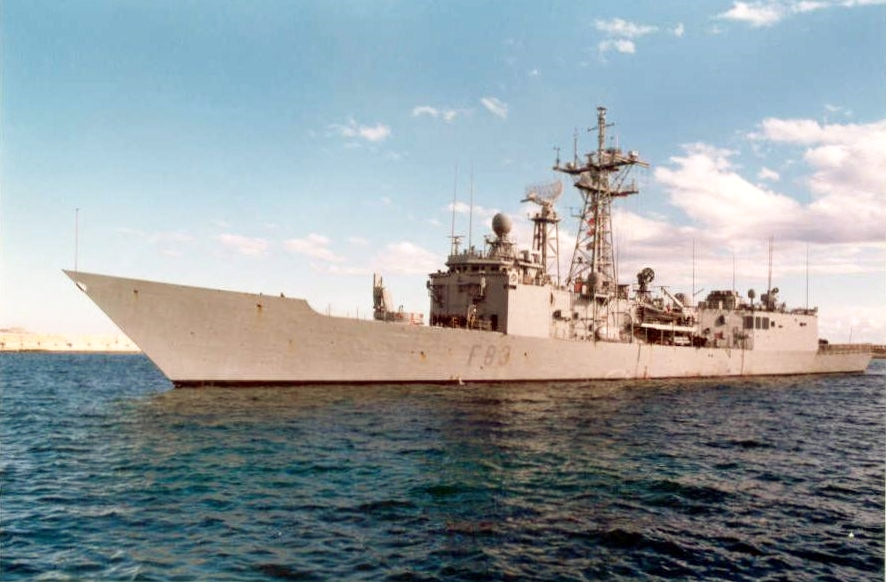
- Numancia

History

Spain
- Name: Numancia
- Builder: Bazan
- Laid down: 8 January 1986
- Launched: 29 January 1987
- Commissioned: 17 November 1989
- Home port: Rota, Cádiz
- Identification: MMSI number: 224964000; Callsign: EBFN; Pennant number: F83
- Status: in active service

General characteristics
- Class & type: Santa Maria-class frigate
- Displacement: 3,160 t (3,110 long tons) standard
- Length: 138.8 m (455 ft 5 in)
- Beam: 14.3 m (46 ft 11 in)
- Draught: 6.6 m (21 ft 8 in) max
- Propulsion: 2 × General Electric LM2500-30 gas turbines generating 41,000 shp (31 MW) through a single shaft and variable pitch propeller; 2 × Auxiliary Propulsion Units, 350 hp (260 kW) retractable electric azimuth thrusters for maneuvering and docking.
- Speed: 29 knots (54 km/h; 33 mph)
- Complement: 223
- Sensors & processing systems: Radar: AN/SPS-49(V)4 2-D air search ((V)5 in F-85 & F-86), RAN-12L (being replaced by RAN-30) 2-D low horizon air search radar for Meroka, SPS-55 surface search radar, Mk 92 fire control system, Sonar: SQS-56, SQR-19(V) Towed Array (-19(V)2 in F-85 & F-86), Fire control: Mk 13 weapons control, Mk 92 and SPG-60 STIR missile control, SQQ-89 ASW
- Electronic warfare & decoys: Nettunel (F-85 & F-86: Mk-3000) intercept, SLQ-25 Nixie, Mk36 SROC decoy launchers
- Armament: 1 × single-arm Mk 13 Missile Launcher with a 40-round magazine that can handle 32 SM-1MR anti-air/ship missiles and 8 Harpoon anti-ship missiles; 2 × triple Mark 32 ASW torpedo tubes with Mark 46 Mod 5 anti-submarine torpedoes; 1 × OTO Melara 76 mm/62 cal. naval gun; 1 × 20 mm Meroka 12-barrel CIWS system
- Aircraft carried: 2 × Sikorsky SH-60B Seahawk LAMPS III helicopters

Numancia (F83) is the third of the six Spanish-built Santa Maria-class frigates of the Spanish Navy, based on the American Oliver Hazard Perry class design. The frigate was constructed in Spain by Bazan and laid down on 8 January 1986; launched on 29 January 1987; and entered service with the Spanish Navy on 17 November 1989. Based at Rota, Numancia has been deployed to the Indian Ocean to fight piracy in Somalia as part of Operation Atalanta and to the Mediterranean Sea to intercept illegal trafficking of migrants as part of Operation Sophia.

== Design and description ==
The Santa María class is a series of six guided missile frigates based on the American Oliver Hazard Perry class. The Oliver Hazard Perry class had been conceived as a way to reduce unit costs while maintaining an anti-air warfare (AAW) platform with anti-submarine (ASW) and anti-surface warfare capabilities. The Oliver Hazard Perry class came in two forms: short-hulled and long-hulled, with the Santa María class being the later, with an additional beam to allow for more top weight for future modifications. The class came in two batches, with the first four being from batch one and the final two from batch two. The first batch of ships had a displacement of 2,851 tonnes (2,806 long tons) light, 3,160 t (3,110 long tons) standard, and 4,017 t (3,954 long tons) at full load. The second batch has the same light and standard displacements, with a full load displacement of 4,107 t (4,042 long tons). The frigates measure 138.8 metres (455 ft 5 in) long overall and 125.9 m (413 ft 1 in) at the waterline with a beam of 14.3 m (46 ft 11 in) and a standard draught of 4.52 m (14 ft 10 in) and a maximum draught at the sonar dome of 6.6 m (21 ft 8 in). The ships have a complement of 223 sailors including 13 officers.

The Santa María class is propelled by a controllable pitch propller powered by two General Electric LM2500 gas turbines creating 41,000 shaft horsepower (31,000 kW), giving the vessels a maximum speed of 29 knots (54 km/h; 33 mph). The frigates stow 587 t (578 long tons; 647 short tons) of fuel and have a range of 5,000 nautical miles (9,300 km; 5,800 mi) at 18 knots (33 km/h; 21 mph) or 4,500 nmi (8,300 km; 5,200 mi) at 20 knots (37 km/h; 23 mph). The ships have four 1,000 kW Kato-Allison 114-DOOL diesel generator sets creating a total of 4,000 kW. These can power two 260 kW (350 shp) retractable, rotatable auxiliary propulsion motors. The vessels have fin stabilisers fitted.

=== Armament and sensors ===
Frigates of the Santa María class are armed with a single-armed Mk 13 missile launcher serviced by a 40-round magazine that can handle 32 SM-1MR anti-air/ship missiles and 8 Harpoon anti-ship missiles. The Harpoon missiles have a range of 50 nmi (93 km; 58 mi) at Mach 0.9 carrying a 227-kilogram (500 lb) warhead. The SM-1R missiles have a range of 20.5 nmi (38.0 km; 23.6 mi) at Mach 2. The vessels also mount a single OTO Melara 76-millimetre (3.0 in)/62 calibre naval gun capable of firing 85 rounds per minute up to 8.7 nmi (16.1 km; 10.0 mi) with each shell carrying a 6 kg (13 lb) warhead. (Note: /62 refers to the length of the gun in terms of calibres. A /62 gun is 62 times long as its bore diameter.) For AAW defence, the ships mount a single Meroka 20 mm (0.79 in)/120 12-barrelled close-in weapons system (CIWS) capable of firing 3,600 rounds per minute up to 2 km (1.2 mi). For ASW, the frigates are armed with two triple-mounted Mark 32 torpedo tubes for Mod 5 Mark 46 torpedoes.

The vessels are equipped with AN/SPS-49(V)4 2-D air search radar, RAN-12L (being replaced by RAN-30) 2-D low horizon air search radar for the Meroka CIWS, SPS-55 surface search radar and a Mk 92 fire-control radar. For ASW, the ships have SQS-56 sonar and SQR-19(V) towed arrays. For weapons fire control, they have Mk 13 weapons control, Mk 92 and SPG-60 STIR missile control, and SQQ-89 ASW systems. For electronic warfare they have a Nettunel intercept, a SLQ-25 Nixie towed torpedo decoy, and Mk36 SROC decoy launchers.

=== Aircraft ===
As long-hulled versions of the Oliver Hazard Perry class, the Santa María-class frigates have twin hangars to accommodate up to two Sikorsky SH-60B Seahawk Light Airborne Multi-Purpose System (LAMPS) III helicopters though only one is usually embarked. The helicopter deck, located aft, is equipped with the RAST helicopter deck-handling system designed to handle LAMPS helicopters.

== Construction and career ==
The frigate was ordered on 29 June 1977. The ship was laid down on 8 January 1986, at Izar's shipyard in Ferrol, Spain. Delays in construction followed as the Spanish Navy deferred the frigate's construction in order to focus on the construction of a new aircraft carrier. Numancia was launched on 29 January 1987, and commissioned into service on 17 November 1989. The vessel is homeported at Rota, Spain, as part of the 41st Escort Squadron.

On 27 April 2009, Numancia seized the nine Somali pirates that tried to board the cruise ship MSC Melody after a short chase. From March to August 2013, Numancia deployed to the Indian Ocean as part of Operation Atalanta. In 2016, the frigate was deployed as part of Operation Sophia, intercepting the illegal trafficking of migrants in the Mediterranean Sea. In 2022, Numancia returned to the Indian Ocean, escorting food relief ships through the area as part of Operation Atalanta.
