= Santa María-class frigate =

Class of Spanish frigates based on the Oliver Perry class

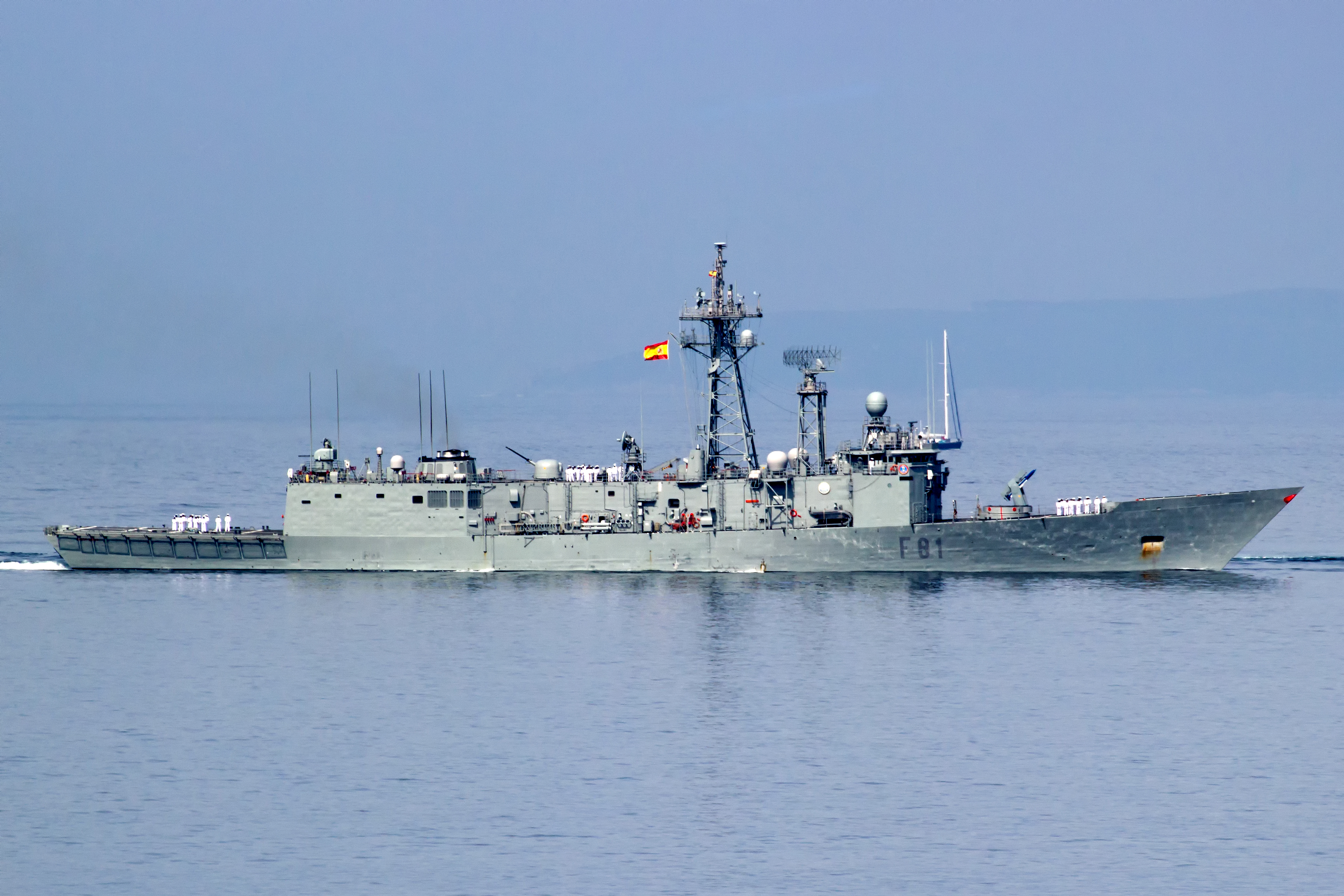
- Santa María, lead ship of the class, in 2017.

Class overview
- Name: Santa María class
- Builders: Bazan, Ferrol, Spain
- Operators: Spanish Navy
- Preceded by: Baleares class
- Succeeded by: F110 class
- Built: 1982–1994
- In commission: 1986–present
- Planned: 6
- Completed: 6
- Active: 6

General characteristics
- Type: Guided missile frigate
- Displacement: 3,160 t (3,110 long tons) standard
- Length: 138.8 m (455 ft 5 in)
- Beam: 14.3 m (46 ft 11 in)
- Draught: 6.6 m (21 ft 8 in) max
- Propulsion: 2 × General Electric LM2500-30 gas turbines generating 41,000 shp (31 MW) through a single shaft and variable pitch propeller; 2 × Auxiliary Propulsion Units, 350 hp (260 kW) retractable electric azimuth thrusters for maneuvering and docking.
- Speed: 29 knots (54 km/h; 33 mph)
- Complement: 223
- Sensors & processing systems: Radar: AN/SPS-49(V)4 2-D air search ((V)5 in F-85 & F-86), RAN-12L (being replaced by RAN-30) 2-D low horizon air search radar for Meroka, SPS-55 surface search radar, Mk 92 fire control system, Sonar: SQS-56, SQR-19(V) Towed Array (-19(V)2 in F-85 & F-86), Fire control: Mk 13 weapons control, Mk 92 and SPG-60 STIR missile control, SQQ-89 ASW
- Electronic warfare & decoys: Nettunel (F-85 & F-86: Mk-3000) intercept, SLQ-25 Nixie, Mk36 SROC decoy launchers
- Armament: 1 × single-arm Mk 13 Missile Launcher with a 40-round magazine that can handle 32 SM-1MR anti-air/ship missiles and 8 Harpoon anti-ship missiles; 2 × triple Mark 32 ASW torpedo tubes with Mark 46 Mod 5 anti-submarine torpedoes; 1 × OTO Melara 76 mm/62 cal. naval gun; 1 × 20 mm Meroka 12-barrel CIWS system
- Aircraft carried: 2 × Sikorsky SH-60B Seahawk LAMPS III helicopters

The Santa María class of guided missile frigates is the Spanish Navy's designation for six warships based on the United States Oliver Hazard Perry-class frigates. Spanish ships have a slightly bigger beam and were built with a greater weight reserve for future improvements. Other changes from the basic model include Meroka replacing Phalanx and a RAN-12L air search radar to provide low horizon coverage against sea skimmers cueing the Meroka CIWS mount. The Nettunel EW suite (based on the Italian Nettuno built in Spain) replaced the SLQ-32 system fitted aboard US ships. The first ship Santa Maria entered service in 1986.

They are expected to be replaced by the new Bonifaz class starting around 2028.

== Design and description ==
The Santa María class are a series of six guided missile frigates based on the American Oliver Hazard Perry class. The Oliver Hazard Perry class had been conceived as a way to reduce unit costs while maintaining an anti-air warfare (AAW) platform with anti-submarine (ASW) and anti-surface warfare capabilities. The Oliver Hazard Perry class came in two forms, the short-hulled and long-hulled, with the Santa María class being of the later with additional beam to allow for more top weight for future modifications. The class came in two batches, with the first four being of batch one and the final two of the second. The first batch of ships have a displacement of 2,851 tonnes (2,806 long tons) light, 3,160 t (3,110 long tons) standard and 4,017 t (3,954 long tons) at full load. The second batch have the same light and standard displacements, with a full load displacement of 4,107 t (4,042 long tons). The frigates measure 138.8 metres (455 ft 5 in) long overall and 125.9 m (413 ft 1 in) at the waterline with a beam of 14.3 m (46 ft 11 in) and a standard draught of 4.52 m (14 ft 10 in) and a maximum draught at the sonar dome of 6.6 m (21 ft 8 in). The ships have a complement of 223 sailors including 13 officers.

The Santa María class is propelled by a controllable pitch propeller powered by two General Electric LM2500 gas turbines creating 41,000 shaft horsepower (31,000 kW), giving the vessels a maximum speed of 29 knots (54 km/h; 33 mph). The frigates stow 587 t (578 long tons; 647 short tons) of fuel and have a range of 5,000 nautical miles (9,300 km; 5,800 mi) at 18 knots (33 km/h; 21 mph) or 4,500 nmi (8,300 km; 5,200 mi) at 20 knots (37 km/h; 23 mph). The ships have four 1,000 kW Kato-Allison 114-DOOL diesel generator sets creating a total of 4,000 kW. These can power two 260 kW (350 shp) retractable, rotatable auxiliary propulsion motors. The vessels have fin stabilisers fitted.

=== Armament and sensors ===
Frigates of the Santa María class are armed with a single-armed Mk 13 missile launcher serviced by a 40-round magazine that can handle 32 SM-1MR anti-air/ship missiles and 8 Harpoon anti-ship missiles. The Harpoon missiles have a range of 50 nmi (93 km; 58 mi) at Mach 0.9 carrying a 227-kilogram (500 lb) warhead. The SM-1R missiles have a range of 20.5 nmi (38.0 km; 23.6 mi) at Mach 2. The vessels also mount a single OTO Melara 76-millimetre (3.0 in)/62 calibre naval gun capable of firing 85 rounds per minute up to 8.7 nmi (16.1 km; 10.0 mi) with each shell carrying a 6 kg (13 lb) warhead. (Note: /62 refers to the length of the gun in terms of calibres. A /62 gun is 62 times long as its bore diameter.) For AAW defence, the ships mount a single Meroka 20 mm (0.79 in)/120 12-barrelled close-in weapons system (CIWS) capable of firing 3,600 rounds per minute up to 2 km (1.2 mi). For ASW, the frigates are armed with two triple-mounted Mark 32 torpedo tubes for Mod 5 Mark 46 torpedoes.

The vessels are equipped with AN/SPS-49(V)4 2-D air search ((V)5 in Navarra and Canarias) radar, RAN-12L (being replaced by RAN-30) 2-D low horizon air search radar for the Meroka CIWS, SPS-55 surface search radar and a Mk 92 fire-control radar. For ASW, the ships have SQS-56 sonar, SQR-19(V) towed array (-19(V)2 in Navarra and Canarias). For weapons fire control, they have Mk 13 weapons control, Mk 92 and SPG-60 STIR missile control, SQQ-89 ASW systems. For electronic warfare they have Nettunel (Navarra and Canarias: Mk-3000) intercept, a SLQ-25 Nixie towed torpedo decoy, and Mk36 SROC decoy launchers.

=== Aircraft ===
As long-hulled versions of the Oliver Hazard Perry class, the Santa María-class frigates have twin hangars to accommodate up to two Sikorsky SH-60B Seahawk Light Airborne Multi-Purpose System (LAMPS) III helicopters though only one is usually embarked. The helicopter deck, located aft, is equipped with the RAST helicopter deck-handling system designed to handle LAMPS helicopters.

== Construction and service ==
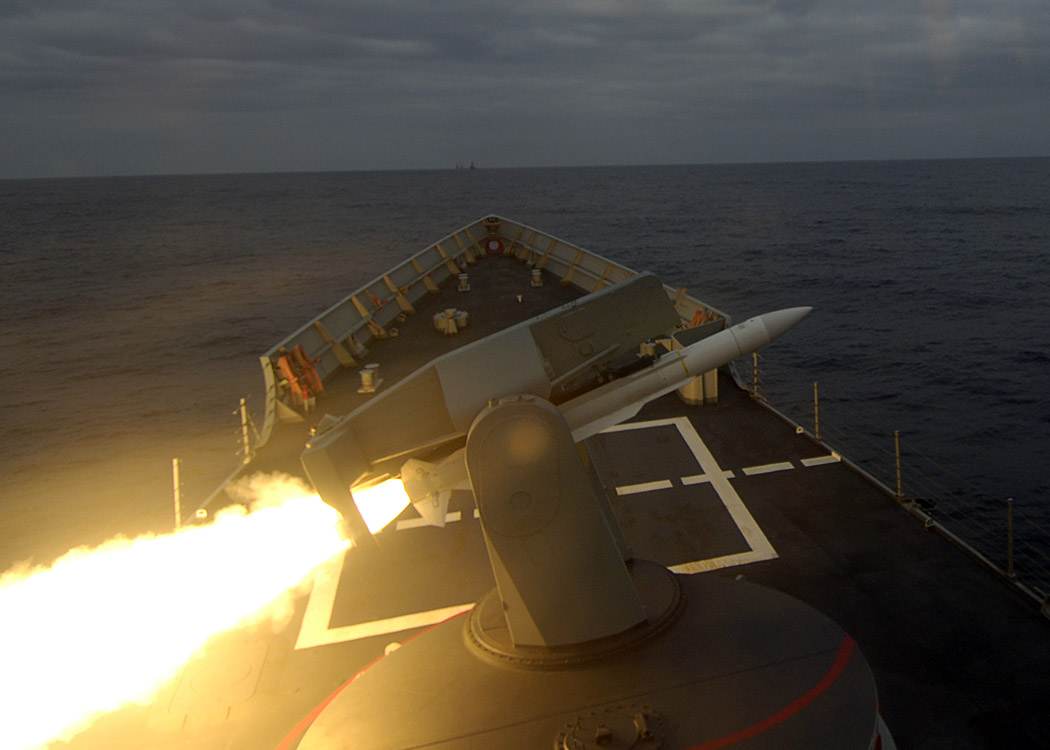
Canarias firing a Standard missile on 30 July 2006

The first three ships were ordered on 29 June 1977. Delays in construction followed as the Spanish Navy deferred the frigates' construction in order to focus on the construction of a new aircraft carrier. The fourth hull was ordered on 19 June 1986, and the final two on 26 December 1989. Santa María was the first of the class to enter service in 1986. In August 1991 Santa María was among the Spanish ships deployed to the Persian Gulf and Red Sea as part of the International Force following the invasion of Kuwait by Iraq. She was later replaced by sister ship Numancia in November. By 1994 all six vessels were active and are homeported at Rota, Spain as part of the 41st Escort Squadron.

== Units of class ==
Santa María class construction data
Number	Name	Builder	Laid down	Launched	Commissioned	Status
F81	Santa María	Izar, Ferrol, Spain	23 May 1982	24 November 1984	12 October 1986	In service
F82	Victoria	Izar, Ferrol, Spain	16 August 1983	23 July 1986	11 November 1987	In service
F83	Numancia	Izar, Ferrol, Spain	8 January 1986	30 January 1987	8 November 1988	In service
F84	Reina Sofía	Izar, Ferrol, Spain	12 December 1987	19 July 1989	18 October 1990	In service
F85	Navarra	Izar, Ferrol, Spain	15 April 1991	23 October 1992	30 May 1994	In service
F86	Canarias	Izar, Ferrol, Spain	15 April 1992	21 June 1993	14 December 1994	In service

== See also ==
Equivalent frigates of the same era

- Jacob van Heemskerck class
- Adelaide class
- Cassard class
- Cheng Kung class
- Godavari class
