= Spanish frigate Canarias =

Santa María-class frigates

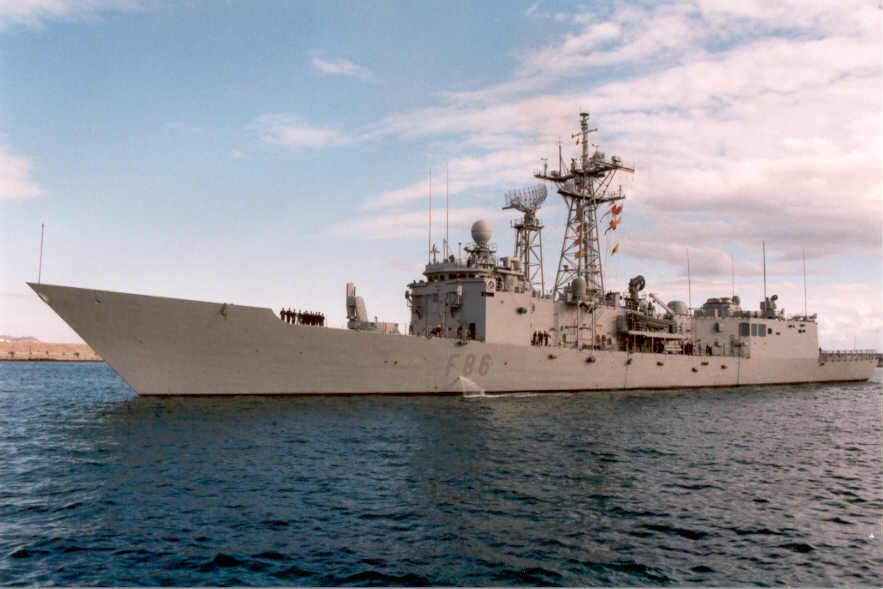
- Canarias

History

Spain
- Name: Canarias
- Namesake: Canarias
- Builder: Bazan
- Laid down: 15 April 1992
- Launched: 21 June 1993
- Commissioned: 14 December 1994
- Home port: Rota
- Identification: MMSI number: 225301000; Callsign: EBFQ; Pennant number: F86
- Status: in active service

General characteristics
- Class & type: Santa María-class frigate
- Displacement: 3,160 t (3,110 long tons) standard
- Length: 138.8 m (455 ft 5 in)
- Beam: 14.3 m (46 ft 11 in)
- Draught: 6.6 m (21 ft 8 in) max
- Propulsion: 2 × General Electric LM2500-30 gas turbines generating 41,000 shp (31 MW) through a single shaft and variable pitch propeller; 2 × Auxiliary Propulsion Units, 350 hp (260 kW) retractable electric azimuth thrusters for maneuvering and docking.
- Speed: 29 knots (54 km/h; 33 mph)
- Complement: 223
- Sensors & processing systems: Radar: AN/SPS-49(V)4 2-D air search ((V)5 in F-85 & F-86), RAN-12L (being replaced by RAN-30) 2-D low horizon air search radar for Meroka, SPS-55 surface search radar, Mk 92 fire control system, Sonar: SQS-56, SQR-19(V) Towed Array (-19(V)2 in F-85 & F-86), Fire control: Mk 13 weapons control, Mk 92 and SPG-60 STIR missile control, SQQ-89 ASW
- Electronic warfare & decoys: Nettunel (F-85 & F-86: Mk-3000) intercept, SLQ-25 Nixie, Mk36 SROC decoy launchers
- Armament: 1 × single-arm Mk 13 Missile Launcher with a 40-round magazine that can handle 32 SM-1MR anti-air/ship missiles and 8 Harpoon anti-ship missiles; 2 × triple Mark 32 ASW torpedo tubes with Mark 46 Mod 5 anti-submarine torpedoes; 1 × OTO Melara 76 mm/62 cal. naval gun; 1 × 20 mm Meroka 12-barrel CIWS system
- Aircraft carried: 2 × Sikorsky SH-60B Seahawk LAMPS III helicopters

Canarias (F86), is the last of the six Spanish-built Santa María-class frigates of the Spanish Navy, which are based on the American Oliver Hazard Perry-class design. The Santa María class offer both anti-air and anti-submarine defence for the Spanish Navy. The frigate was laid down by Bazan on 15 April 1992 and launched on 21 June 1993. Upon entering service on 14 December 1994, Canarias was homeported at Rota and assigned to the 41st Escort Squadron. Canarias has been assigned to Operation Atalanta of the Somali coast, combatting piracy and Operation Sophia in the Mediterranean Sea, intercepting illegal trafficking of migrants.

== Design and description ==
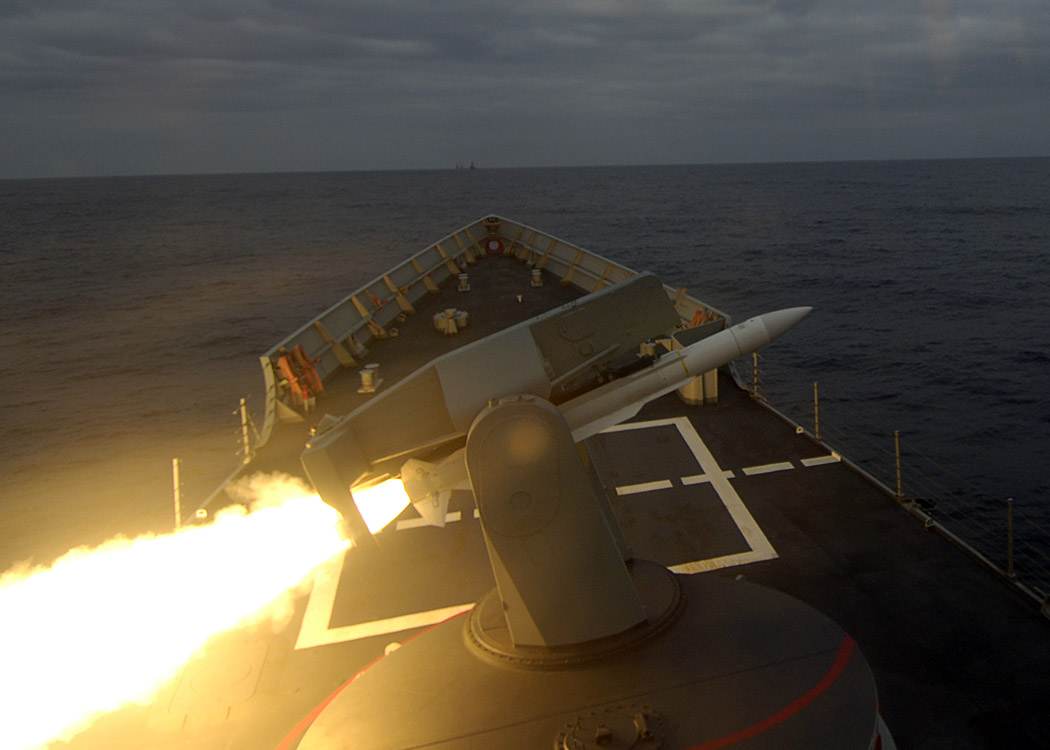
Canarias firing a Standard missile

The Santa María class are a series of six guided missile frigates based on the American Oliver Hazard Perry class. The Oliver Hazard Perry class had been conceived as a way to reduce unit costs while maintaining an anti-air warfare (AAW) platform with anti-submarine (ASW) and anti-surface warfare capabilities. The Oliver Hazard Perry class came in two forms, the short-hulled and long-hulled, with the Santa María class being of the later with additional beam to allow for more top weight for future modifications. The class came in two batches, with the first four being of batch one and the final two of the second. The first batch of ships have a displacement of 2,851 tonnes (2,806 long tons) light, 3,160 t (3,110 long tons) standard and 4,017 t (3,954 long tons) at full load. The second batch have the same light and standard displacements, with a full load displacement of 4,107 t (4,042 long tons). The frigates measure 138.8 metres (455 ft 5 in) long overall and 125.9 m (413 ft 1 in) at the waterline with a beam of 14.3 m (46 ft 11 in) and a standard draught of 4.52 m (14 ft 10 in) and a maximum draught at the sonar dome of 6.6 m (21 ft 8 in). The ships have a complement of 223 sailors including 13 officers.

The Santa María class is propelled by a controllable pitch propeller powered by two General Electric LM2500 gas turbines creating 41,000 shaft horsepower (31,000 kW), giving the vessels a maximum speed of 29 knots (54 km/h; 33 mph). The frigates stow 587 t (578 long tons; 647 short tons) of fuel and have a range of 5,000 nautical miles (9,300 km; 5,800 mi) at 18 knots (33 km/h; 21 mph) or 4,500 nmi (8,300 km; 5,200 mi) at 20 knots (37 km/h; 23 mph). The ships have four 1,000 kW Kato-Allison 114-DOOL diesel generator sets creating a total of 4,000 kW. These can power two 260 kW (350 shp) retractable, rotatable auxiliary propulsion motors. The vessels have fin stabilisers fitted.

=== Armament and sensors ===
Frigates of the Santa María class are armed with a single-armed Mk 13 missile launcher serviced by a 40-round magazine that can handle 32 SM-1MR anti-air/ship missiles and 8 Harpoon anti-ship missiles. The Harpoon missiles have a range of 50 nmi (93 km; 58 mi) at Mach 0.9 carrying a 227-kilogram (500 lb) warhead. The SM-1R missiles have a range of 20.5 nmi (38.0 km; 23.6 mi) at Mach 2. The vessels also mount a single OTO Melara 76-millimetre (3.0 in)/62 calibre naval gun capable of firing 85 rounds per minute up to 8.7 nmi (16.1 km; 10.0 mi) with each shell carrying a 6 kg (13 lb) warhead. (Note: /62 refers to the length of the gun in terms of calibres. A /62 gun is 62 times long as its bore diameter.) For AAW defence, the ships mount a single Meroka 20 mm (0.79 in)/120 12-barrelled close-in weapons system (CIWS) capable of firing 3,600 rounds per minute up to 2 km (1.2 mi). For ASW, the frigates are armed with two triple-mounted Mark 32 torpedo tubes for Mod 5 Mark 46 torpedoes.

The vessels are equipped with AN/SPS-49(V)5 2-D air search radar, RAN-12L (being replaced by RAN-30) 2-D low horizon air search radar for the Meroka CIWS, SPS-55 surface search radar and a Mk 92 fire-control radar. For ASW, the ships have SQS-56 sonar, SQR-19(V)2 towed array. For weapons fire control, they have Mk 13 weapons control, Mk 92 and SPG-60 STIR missile control, SQQ-89 ASW systems. For electronic warfare they have Nettunel Mk-3000 intercept, a SLQ-25 Nixie towed torpedo decoy, and Mk36 SROC decoy launchers.

=== Aircraft ===
As long-hulled versions of the Oliver Hazard Perry class, the Santa María-class frigates have twin hangars to accommodate up to two Sikorsky SH-60B Seahawk Light Airborne Multi-Purpose System (LAMPS) III helicopters though only one is usually embarked. The helicopter deck, located aft, is equipped with the RAST helicopter deck-handling system designed to handle LAMPS helicopters.

== Construction and career ==
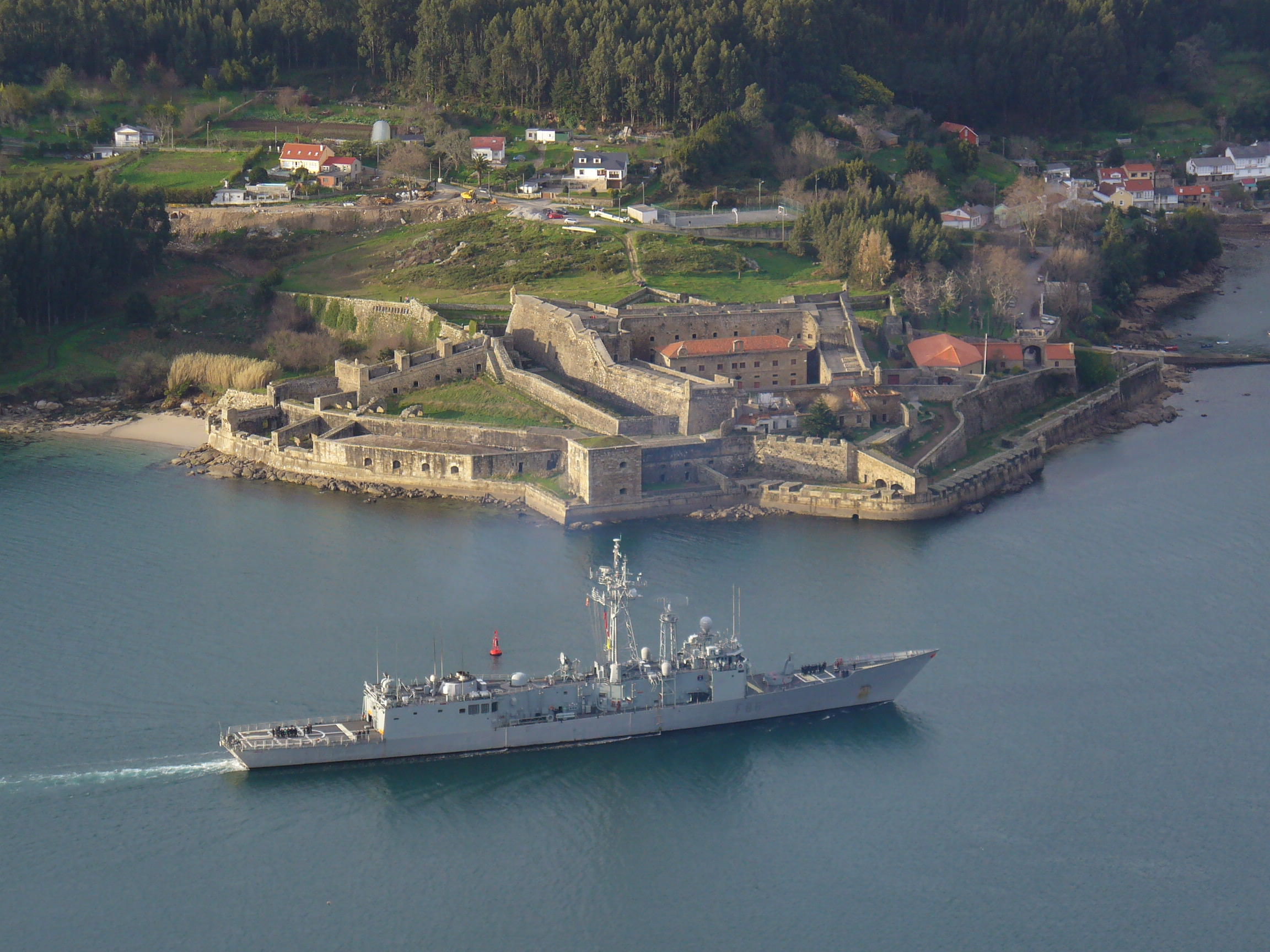
Canarias off Ferrol with the castle of San Felipe in the background

The sixth and last hull of the Santa Maria class was ordered on 26 December 1989. The ship was laid down on 15 April 1992 by Bazan at their shipyard in Ferrol, Spain. Canarias was launched on 21 June 1993 and commissioned in service on 14 December 1994. Upon entering service, Canarias was homeported at Rota and assigned to the 41st Escort Squadron.

In 2008, Canarias was one of three ships of the class that suffered damage after a crane fell on the frigates while tied up at Rota. In 2009, Canarias was assigned to Operation Atalanta, the international effort to fight piracy off Somalia. On 5 October, Canarias arrested two of the hijackers of the tuna boat Alakrana that had been captured by Somali pirates. Canarias was reinforced by the frigate Méndez Núñez on 26 October. The two Spanish vessels recovered Alakrana on 18 November 2009. Spanish helicopters operating from the ships fired upon a pirate zodiac and skiff during the operation. In early 2011, Canarias was deployed again off the coast of Somalia. On 11 March 2011, Canarias aided the disabled cargo ship RAK Afrikana off the coast of Somalia. The Italian frigate Zeffiro, with the aid of Canarias, assisted the crew of RAK Afrikana in disembarking the vessel before it sank. On 31 March 2011, Canarias captured 11 Somali pirates that attempted to hijack a fishing vessel in the Indian Ocean.

In September 2015, the frigate was assigned to Operation Sophia, the interception of illegal trafficking of migrants across the Mediterranean Sea. Canarias rescued 517 migrants from traffickers in November 2015, destroying their vessel after recovering the passengers. Canarias rescued over 1,100 migrants from traffickers before returning to Rota in January 2016. Canarias returned to Operation Sophia in January 2017.

In 2019, Canarias, once again operating off the Somali coast, responded to a distress call from a Somali Navy vessel that had become disabled. Canarias aided the Somali personnel in getting their craft operating again.

== Notes ==
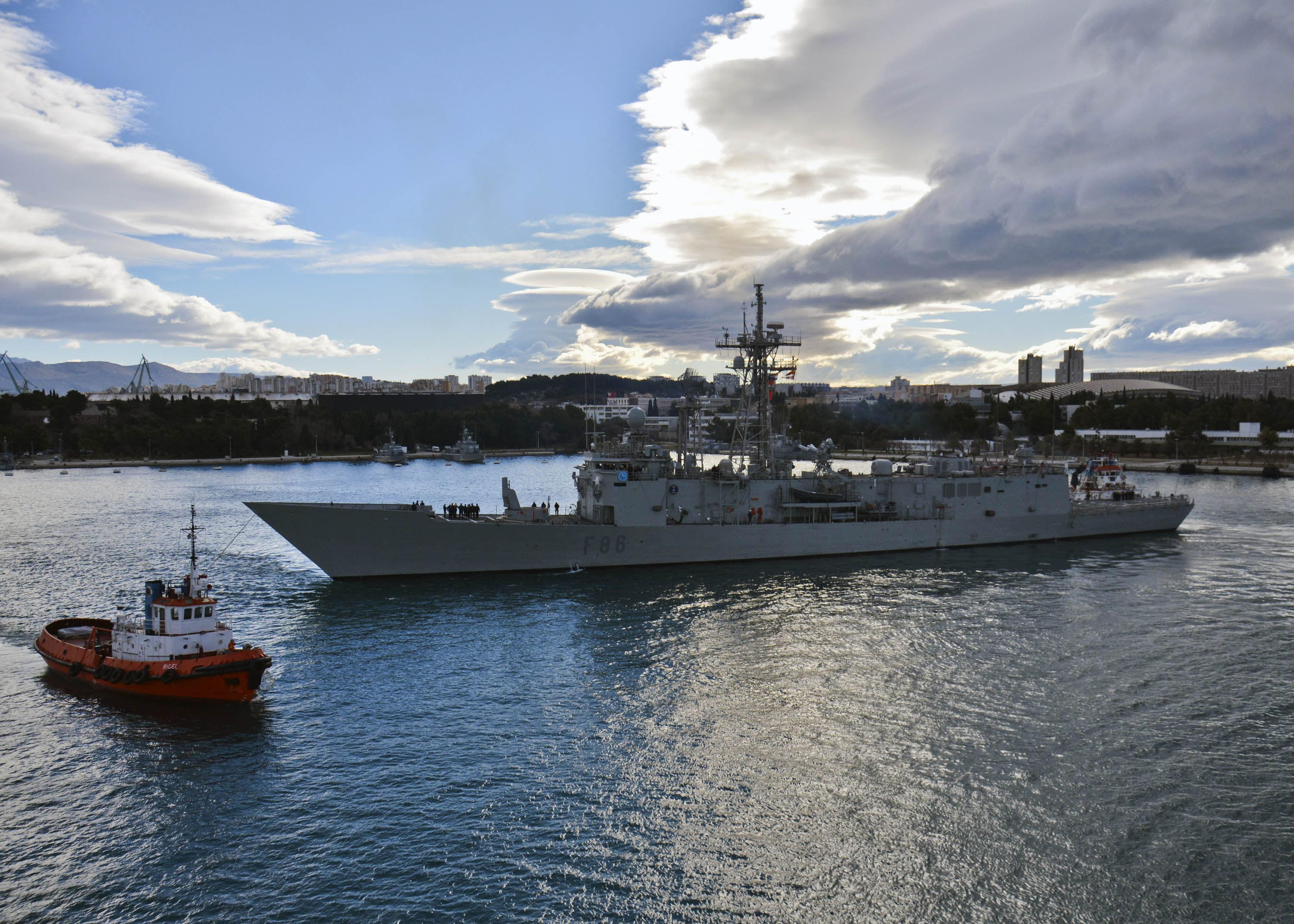
Canarias in Split on 10 February 2015
