= Roberto Cesaretti =

Italian naval officer

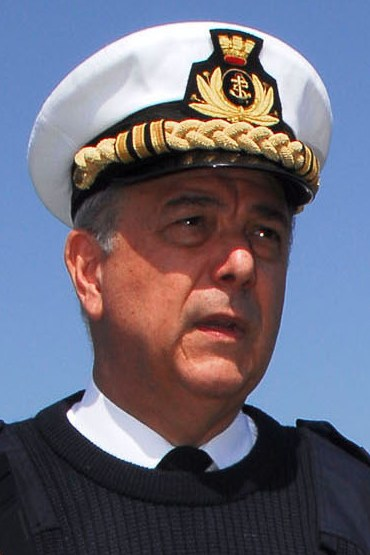
- Born: 13 April 1945 (age 81); Rome, Italy
- Military career
- Allegiance: Italy
- Branch: Italian Navy
- Rank: Vice Admiral
- Commands: Deputy Chief of Staff Supreme Headquarters Allied Powers Europe; Italian aircraft carrier Giuseppe Garibaldi; Italian frigate Zeffiro
- Awards: Officer of the Order of Merit of Republic of Italy

Vice Admiral Roberto Cesaretti is a retired Italian naval officer who served as Deputy Chief of Staff Supreme Headquarters Allied Powers Europe. He commanded the minesweepers Mango and Sandalo and in 1984 commanded frigate Zeffiro before attending the US Naval War College.

In 1990-91 he commanded Italian aircraft carrier Giuseppe Garibaldi.

He was promoted to Flag rank on 31 December 1994. From October 1999 to October 2000 he assumed command of Italian Blue Water Surface Forces (COMFORAL).

He was promoted to vice admiral on 1 January 2002 before assuming the position of Deputy Chief of Staff, Supreme Headquarters Allied Powers Europe (SHAPE) in October 2002.

From 2005 to 2008 he commanded Allied Maritime Command Naples. After his retirement he was appointed Managing Director of Marconi spa.
