= F82 =

F82 or F-82 may refer to:

- North American F-82 Twin Mustang, a 1945 American piston engine fighter
- HMS Sikh (F82), a Royal Navy Tribal-class destroyer, 1938–1942
- HMS Somerset (F82), a Royal Navy Type 23 frigate, launched 1994
- HMS Magpie (F82), formerly U82, a Royal Navy Black Swan-class sloop 1943–1959
- HMS Bulolo (F82), a passenger and cargo ship in Royal Navy service 1940–1946
- Spanish frigate Victoria (F82), a Santa Maria-class frigate, launched 1986
- F82, a version of the BMW M4 car
