= Spanish frigate Victoria =

Santa María-class frigates

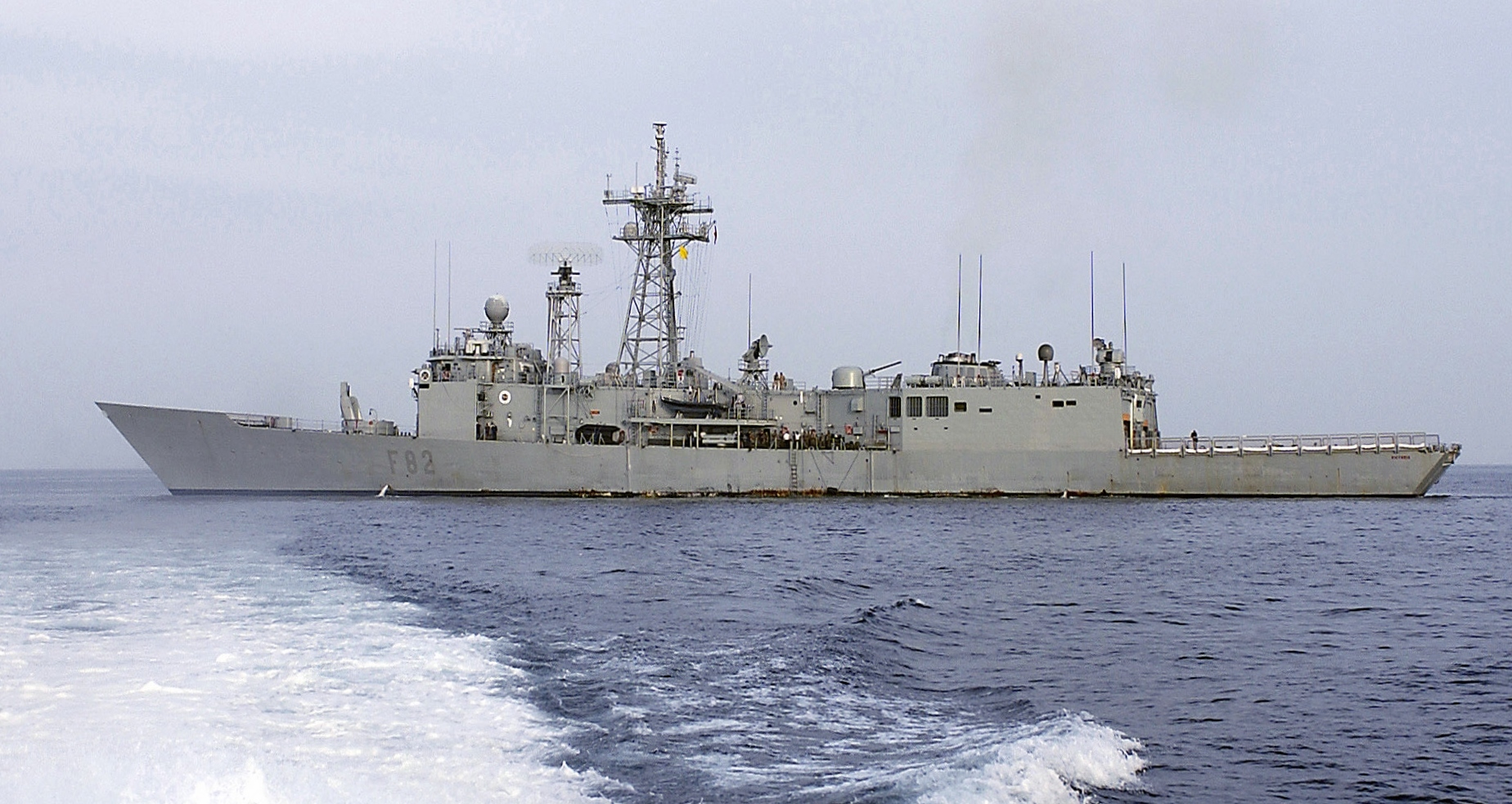
- Victoria on 12 January 2004

History

Spain
- Name: Victoria
- Namesake: Victoria
- Builder: Bazan
- Laid down: 16 August 1983
- Launched: 23 July 1986
- Commissioned: 11 November 1987
- Home port: Rota
- Identification: Pennant number: F82
- Status: in active service

General characteristics
- Class & type: Santa Maria-class frigate
- Displacement: 3,160 t (3,110 long tons) standard
- Length: 138.8 m (455 ft 5 in)
- Beam: 14.3 m (46 ft 11 in)
- Draught: 6.6 m (21 ft 8 in) max
- Propulsion: 2 × General Electric LM2500-30 gas turbines generating 41,000 shp (31 MW) through a single shaft and variable pitch propeller; 2 × Auxiliary Propulsion Units, 350 hp (260 kW) retractable electric azimuth thrusters for maneuvering and docking.
- Speed: 29 knots (54 km/h; 33 mph)
- Complement: 223
- Sensors & processing systems: Radar: AN/SPS-49(V)4 2-D air search ((V)5 in F-85 & F-86), RAN-12L (being replaced by RAN-30) 2-D low horizon air search radar for Meroka, SPS-55 surface search radar, Mk 92 fire control system, Sonar: SQS-56, SQR-19(V) Towed Array (-19(V)2 in F-85 & F-86), Fire control: Mk 13 weapons control, Mk 92 and SPG-60 STIR missile control, SQQ-89 ASW
- Electronic warfare & decoys: Nettunel (F-85 & F-86: Mk-3000) intercept, SLQ-25 Nixie, Mk36 SROC decoy launchers
- Armament: 1 × single-arm Mk 13 Missile Launcher with a 40-round magazine that can handle 32 SM-1MR anti-air/ship missiles and 8 Harpoon anti-ship missiles; 2 × triple Mark 32 ASW torpedo tubes with Mark 46 Mod 5 anti-submarine torpedoes; 1 × OTO Melara 76 mm/62 cal. naval gun; 1 × 20 mm Meroka 12-barrel CIWS system
- Aircraft carried: 2 × Sikorsky SH-60B Seahawk LAMPS III helicopters

Victoria (F82) is the second of the six Spanish-built Santa Maria-class frigates of the Spanish Navy, based on the American Oliver Hazard Perry class design. Constructed in 1983, the vessel was launched on 23 July 1986 and commissioned on 11 November 1987. The frigate has been assigned to Operation Atalanta, fighting piracy of the Somalian coast.

== Design and description ==
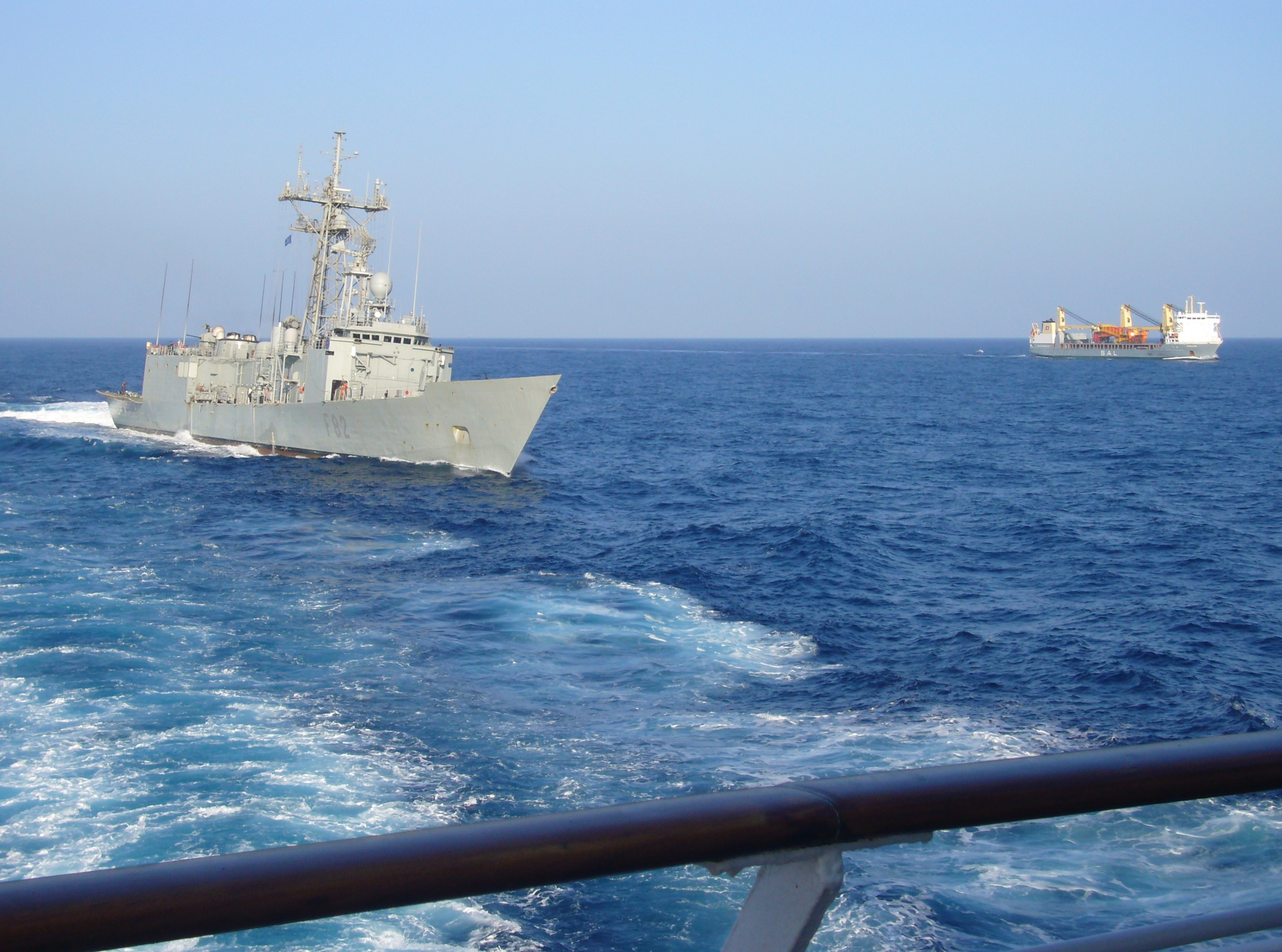
Victoria on 29 March 2009

The Santa María class are a series of six guided missile frigates based on the American Oliver Hazard Perry class. The Oliver Hazard Perry class had been conceived as a way to reduce unit costs while maintaining an anti-air warfare (AAW) platform with anti-submarine (ASW) and anti-surface warfare capabilities. The Oliver Hazard Perry class came in two forms, the short-hulled and long-hulled, with the Santa María class being of the later with additional beam to allow for more top weight for future modifications. The class came in two batches, with the first four being of batch one and the final two of the second. The first batch of ships have a displacement of 2,851 tonnes (2,806 long tons) light, 3,160 t (3,110 long tons) standard and 4,017 t (3,954 long tons) at full load. The second batch have the same light and standard displacements, with a full load displacement of 4,107 t (4,042 long tons). The frigates measure 138.8 metres (455 ft 5 in) long overall and 125.9 m (413 ft 1 in) at the waterline with a beam of 14.3 m (46 ft 11 in) and a standard draught of 4.52 m (14 ft 10 in) and a maximum draught at the sonar dome of 6.6 m (21 ft 8 in). The ships have a complement of 223 sailors including 13 officers.

The Santa María class is propelled by a controllable pitch propller powered by two General Electric LM2500 gas turbines creating 41,000 shaft horsepower (31,000 kW), giving the vessels a maximum speed of 29 knots (54 km/h; 33 mph). The frigates stow 587 t (578 long tons; 647 short tons) of fuel and have a range of 5,000 nautical miles (9,300 km; 5,800 mi) at 18 knots (33 km/h; 21 mph) or 4,500 nmi (8,300 km; 5,200 mi) at 20 knots (37 km/h; 23 mph). The ships have four 1,000 kW Kato-Allison 114-DOOL diesel generator sets creating a total of 4,000 kW. These can power two 260 kW (350 shp) retractable, rotatable auxiliary propulsion motors. The vessels have fin stabilisers fitted.

=== Armament and sensors ===
Frigates of the Santa María class are armed with a single-armed Mk 13 missile launcher serviced by a 40-round magazine that can handle 32 SM-1MR anti-air/ship missiles and 8 Harpoon anti-ship missiles. The Harpoon missiles have a range of 50 nmi (93 km; 58 mi) at Mach 0.9 carrying a 227-kilogram (500 lb) warhead. The SM-1R missiles have a range of 20.5 nmi (38.0 km; 23.6 mi) at Mach 2. The vessels also mount a single OTO Melara 76-millimetre (3.0 in)/62 calibre naval gun capable of firing 85 rounds per minute up to 8.7 nmi (16.1 km; 10.0 mi) with each shell carrying a 6 kg (13 lb) warhead. (Note: /62 refers to the length of the gun in terms of calibres. A /62 gun is 62 times long as its bore diameter.) For AAW defence, the ships mount a single Meroka 20 mm (0.79 in)/120 12-barrelled close-in weapons system (CIWS) capable of firing 3,600 rounds per minute up to 2 km (1.2 mi). For ASW, the frigates are armed with two triple-mounted Mark 32 torpedo tubes for Mod 5 Mark 46 torpedoes.

The vessels are equipped with AN/SPS-49(V)4 2-D air search radar, RAN-12L (being replaced by RAN-30) 2-D low horizon air search radar for the Meroka CIWS, SPS-55 surface search radar and a Mk 92 fire-control radar. For ASW, the ships have SQS-56 sonar, SQR-19(V) towed array. For weapons fire control, they have Mk 13 weapons control, Mk 92 and SPG-60 STIR missile control, SQQ-89 ASW systems. For electronic warfare they have Nettunel intercept, a SLQ-25 Nixie towed torpedo decoy, and Mk36 SROC decoy launchers.

=== Aircraft ===
As long-hulled versions of the Oliver Hazard Perry class, the Santa María-class frigates have twin hangars to accommodate up to two Sikorsky SH-60B Seahawk Light Airborne Multi-Purpose System (LAMPS) III helicopters though only one is usually embarked. The helicopter deck, located aft, is equipped with the RAST helicopter deck-handling system designed to handle LAMPS helicopters.

== Construction and career ==
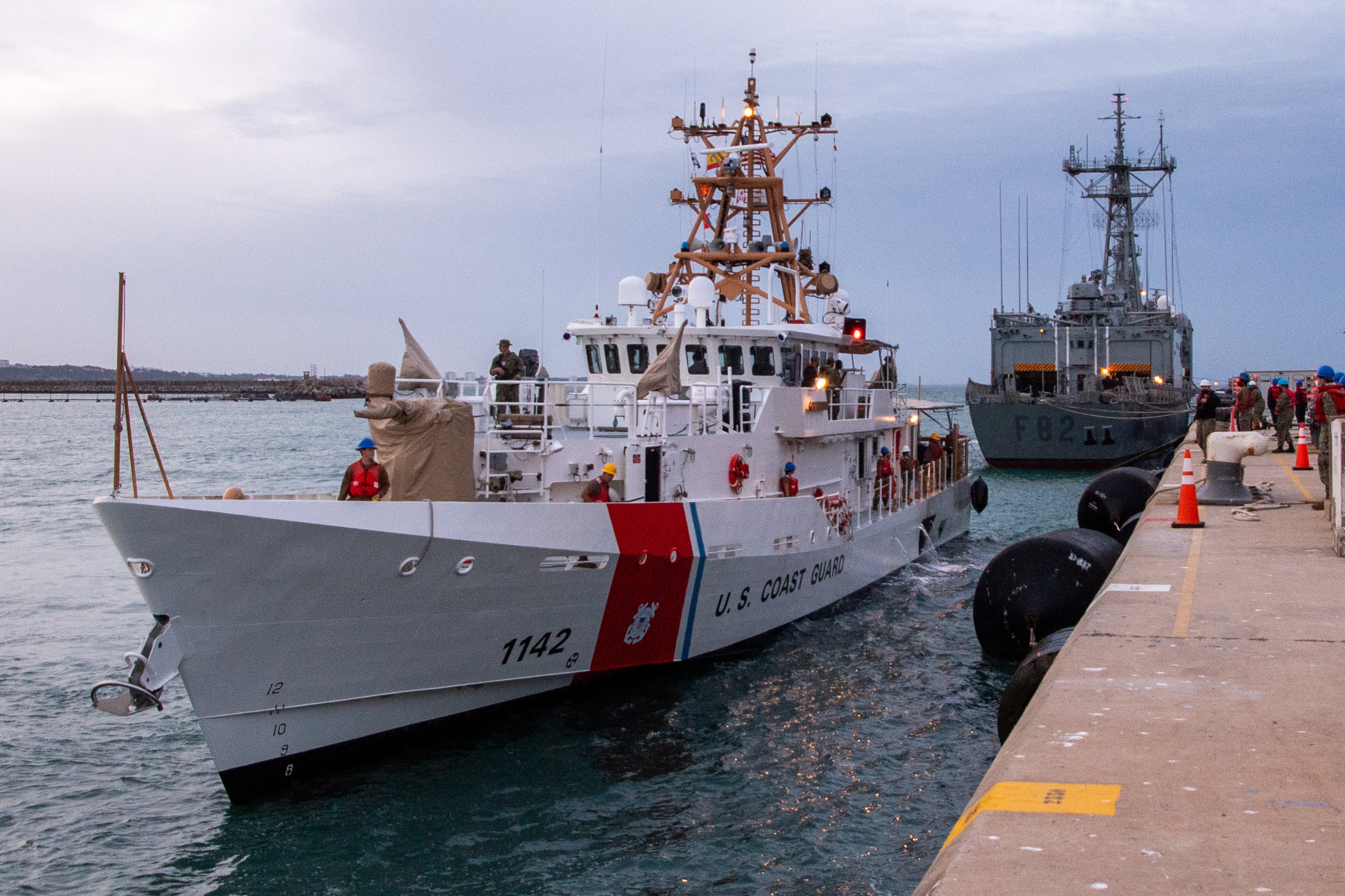
Victoria (rear) at Rota on 13 April 2021

Victoria was ordered on 29 June 1977. The ship was laid down on 16 August 1983 at Izar's shipyard in Ferrol, Spain. Delays in construction followed as the Spanish Navy deferred the frigate's construction in order to focus on the construction of a new aircraft carrier. The frigate was launched on 23 July 1986 and commissioned into service on 11 November 1987. The vessel is homeported at Rota, Spain as part of the 41st Escort Squadron.

On 29 March 2009, as she was taking part in Operation Atalanta, the German Navy tanker Spessart was attacked by a seven-man pirate boat. In addition to the regular 40-man civilian crew, Spessart carried a 12-man security detail which exchanged small arms fire with the pirates, and repelled the assault. The SH-60B helicopter aboard Victoria intercepted the fleeing pirate skiff, opened fire, and kept guard over the surrendering pirates until relieved by naval units. Fellow warships HNLMS De Zeven Provinciën, Psara and USS Boxer were also involved in this chase.

On 2 June 2010, Victoria provided medical assistance to the crew of the Libyan vessel MV Rim, and prevented recapture of that ship by Somali pirates, after the crew of Rim overpowered the pirates who had hijacked the ship four months earlier. Rim had been anchored in the harbour of Garacad, Somalia, since her 3 February 2010 taking in the Gulf of Aden. On 3 August 2010, a helicopter from Victoria stopped a pirate attack on the Norwegian chemical tanker MV Bow Saga, which had sent a distress call that it was under attack by a pirate skiff. The seven pirates on board the skiff were later captured by a second team from the European Union naval force in the region. On 3 August 2010, the Norwegian chemical tanker MV Bow Saga was proceeding through the transit corridor in the middle of the Gulf of Aden when it came under attack. A pirate skiff with 7 people on board shot at the bridge, damaging the windows. EU NAVFOR heard her distress call and ordered the closest warship, Victoria react to the incident. Victoria already had her helicopter in the air and was able to intervene only ten minutes after the call. The pirates stopped the attack and tried to flee. After warning shots, first from the helicopter and then from the warship Victoria, the pirates eventually stopped. The skiff was searched by a boarding team from Victoria and weapons were subsequently found.

In November 2022, the Spanish Navy announced that Victoria was to be modified to include a second boat deck to allow for the use of rigid-hulled inflatable boats.
