= F81 =

F81 may refer to:

- a number of naval warships; including:
  - SPS Santa María (F81)
  - HMS Sutherland (F81)
- Substitution model
