= Italian frigate Zeffiro (F 577) =

Maestrale-class frigate

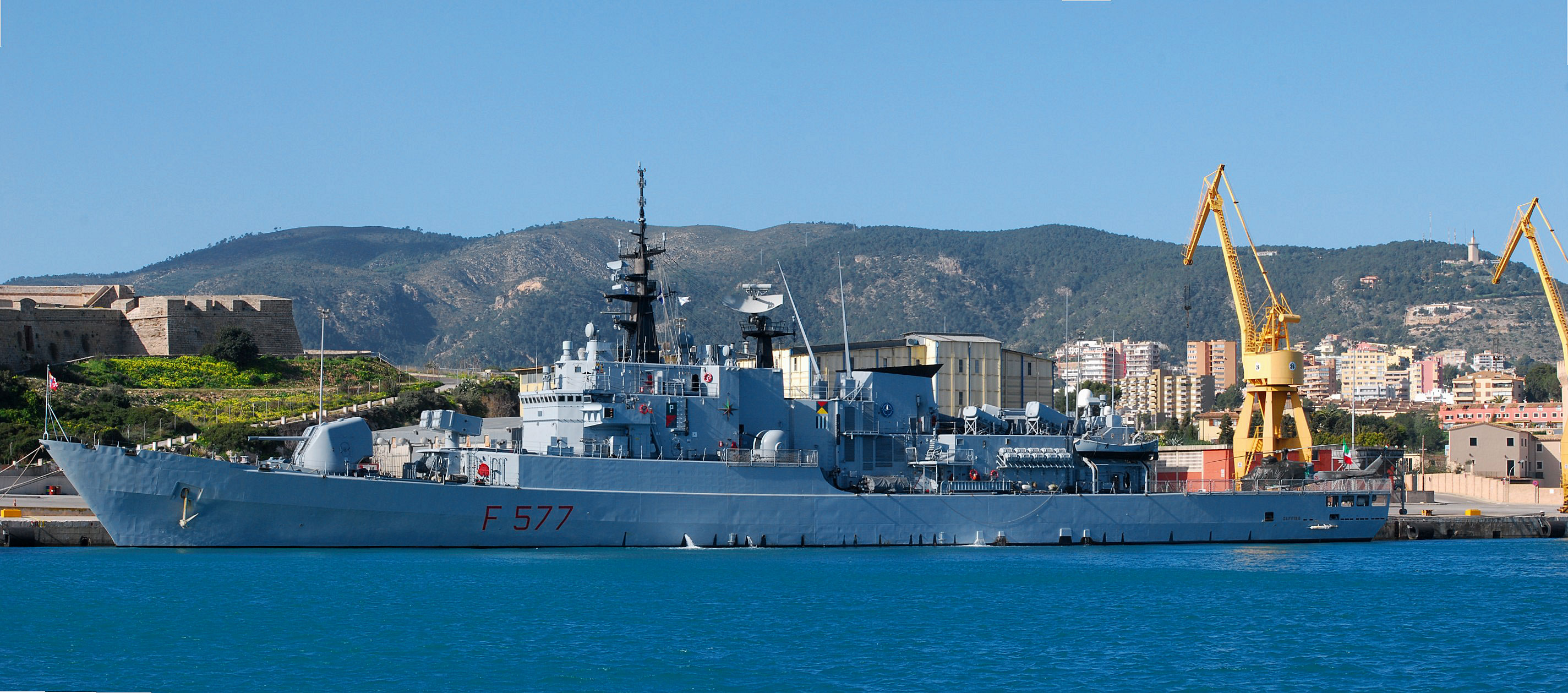
- Zeffiro moored at Palma de Mallorca, date unknown.

History

Italy
- Name: Zeffiro
- Namesake: Zeffiro
- Operator: Italian Navy
- Builder: Fincantieri, Riva Trigoso shipyards
- Laid down: 15 March 1983
- Launched: 19 May 1984
- Commissioned: 4 May 1985
- Identification: Pennant number: F 577
- Motto: Nitor in adversum; (I strive against)
- Status: Decommissioned 5 October 2023

General characteristics
- Class & type: Maestrale-class frigate
- Displacement: 3.040 t (2.992 long tons), full load
- Length: - 122.7 m (403 ft) LOA; - 114 m (374 ft) LPP
- Beam: 12.9 m (42 ft)
- Draught: 4.2 m (14 ft)
- Propulsion: - CODOG scheme; - 2 × GE/Avio General Electric LM2500 gas turbines 18.380 kW (24.648 hp) each; - 2 × diesel engines Grandi Motori Trieste BL-230-20-DVM, 4.044 kW (5.423 hp) each; - 4 × diesel engine generators Grandi Motori Trieste A-236-SS, 780 kW (1,050 hp) each with Ansaldo generators; - 2 × 5-blade propellers
- Speed: 33 kn (61 km/h; 38 mph) (21 kn (39 km/h; 24 mph) on diesel)
- Range: 6,000 nmi (11,000 km; 6,900 mi) at 15 kn (28 km/h; 17 mph)
- Complement: 24 officers; 201 sailors
- Sensors & processing systems: - 1 × Selenia RAN-10S/SPS-774 surface and air surveillance radar; - 1 × Selenia SMA SPS-702 surface search radar; - 1 × Selenia SMA SPS-703 navigation radar (then replaced by one GEM Elettronica MM-SPN 753 Arpa); - 1 × Selenia SPG-75 fire control radar; - 2 × Selenia SPG-74 fire control radar (for Dardo); - 1 × Raytheon DE 1164, VDS sonar; - 1 × Raytheon DE 1160B, hull mounted sonar
- Electronic warfare & decoys: - (Elettronica Spa MM/SLQ-746) 2 × SLQ-D jammers; - 1 × ARBG-1A Saigon radio interceptor; - 1 × SLR-4 Newton intercept; - 2 × 20-round OTO Melara/Breda SCLAR decoy RL (Dagaie on Grecale); - 1 × AN/SLQ-25 Nixie towed acoustic torpedo system; - Prairie/Masker air-bubbler noise-suppression system
- Armament: - 4 × TESEO Mk-2 anti-ship missiles, double launchers; - 1 × Albatross octuple Aspide SAM launchers; - 1 × Otobreda 127 mm/54 gun; - 2 × Oto Melara Twin 40L70 DARDO CIWS; - 2 × Browning HB2B 12.7 mm; - 2 × MG 42/59 7.62 mm; - 2 × 533 mm torpedo tubes (Whitehead B-516, with Whitehead A-184 torpedoes: then removed); - 2 × 324 mm triple torpedo tubes (Whitehead ILAS-3) with Mk-46 Mod.2 torpedoes
- Aircraft carried: - flight deck 27 m (89 ft) x 12 m (39 ft) m; - 2 x AB-212 helicopters

Zeffiro (F 577) is the eighth ship of the Maestrale-class frigate of the Italian Navy. She was decommissioned on 5 October 2023. All Maestrale Class ships are to be replaced by the Bergamini Class Frigates (FREMM).

== Development ==
The Maestrale-class frigates were primarily designed for anti-submarine warfare (ASW), however the ships are highly flexible so they are also capable of anti-air and anti-surface operations. Ships of this class have been widely used in various international missions, either under NATO or UN flag, and during normal operations of the Italian Navy.

The first of these ships entered in service in early 1982. The rest of the fleet was launched over the next three years. The ships of the Maestrale class will be replaced by the Bergamini class.

== Construction and career ==
She was laid down on 15 March 1983 and launched on 19 May 1984 by Fincantieri shipyards. Commissioned on 4 May 1985 with the hull number F 577.

== Gallery ==
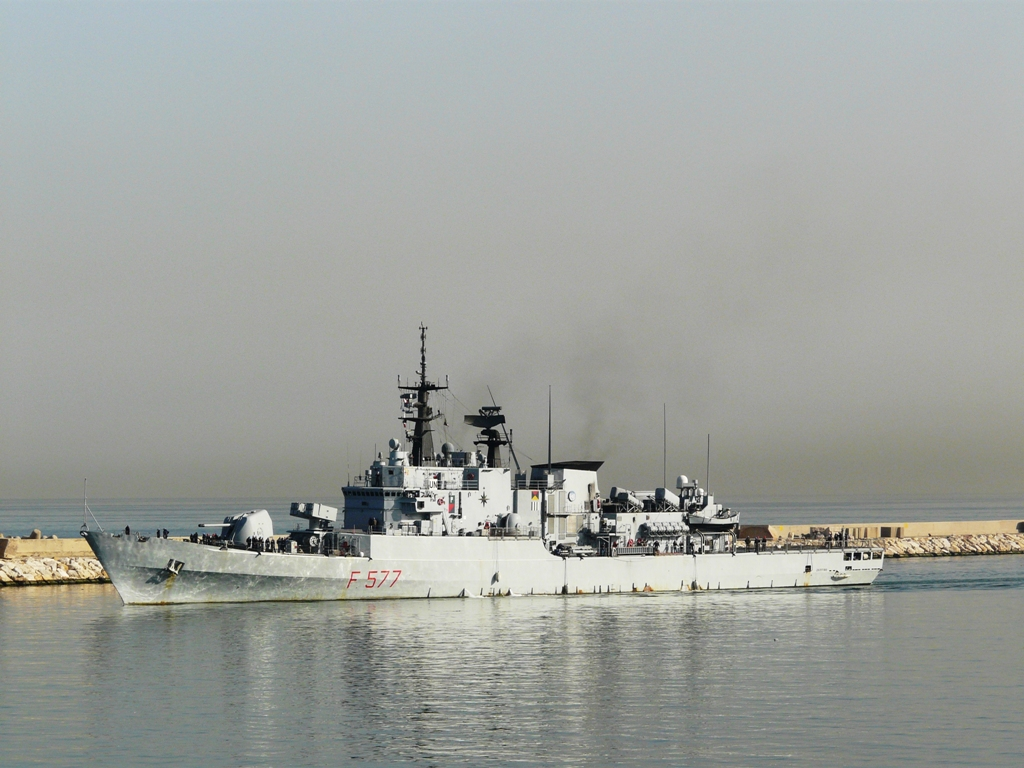
Zeffiro entering the port of Beirut on 24 March 2010.

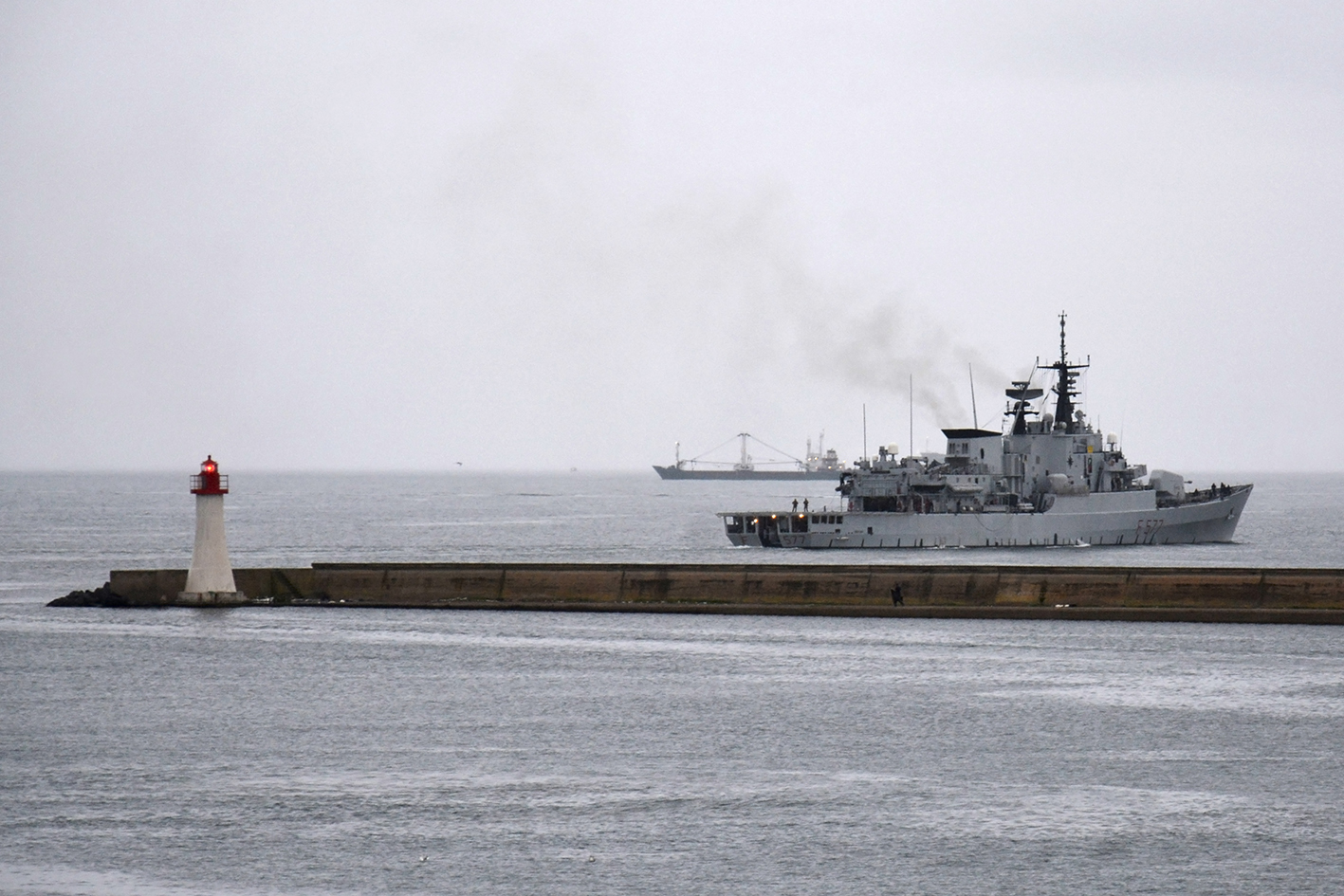
Zeffiro on its way conduct a firing exercise on 21 October 2015.

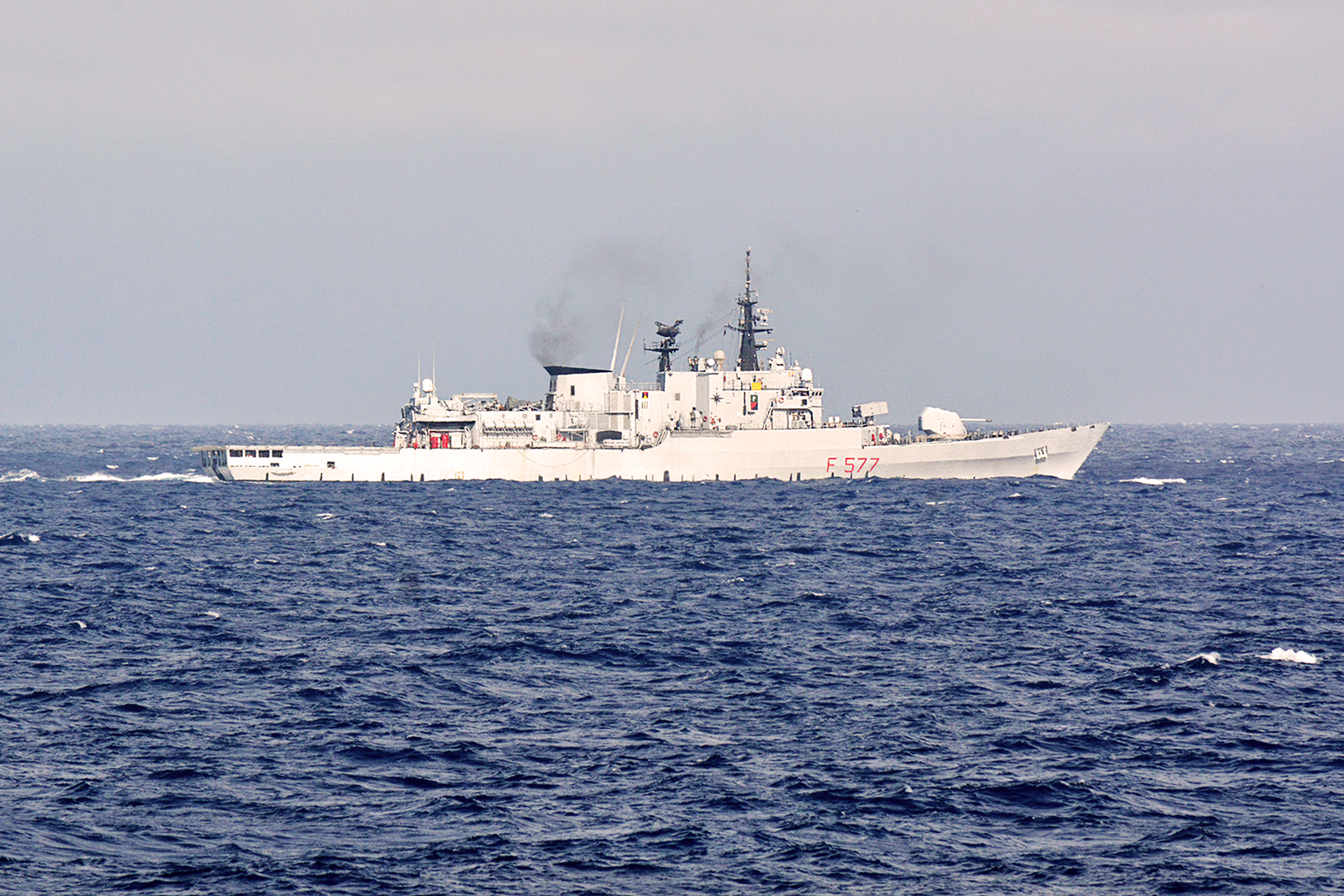
Zeffiro conducting a firing exercise on 21 October 2015.

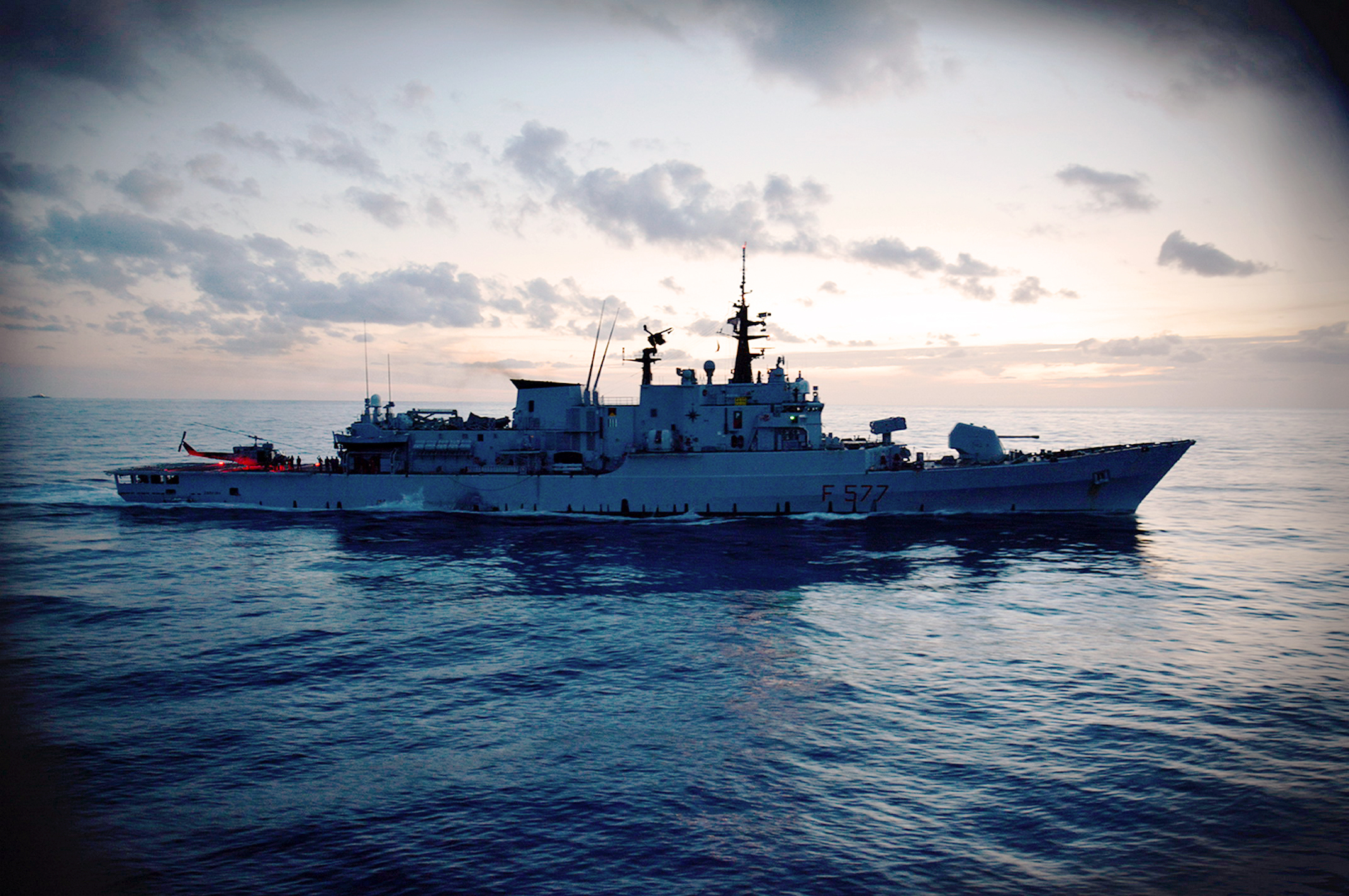
Zeffiro maneuvering at sea on 24 October 2015.
