= Mark 13 missile launcher =

Mark 13 Guided Missile Launching System
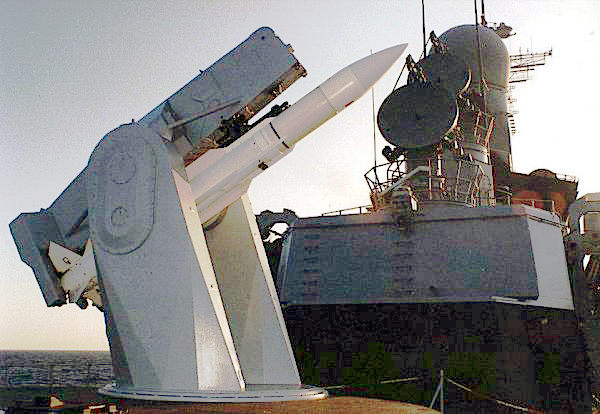
- A RIM-66 Standard missile mounted on the Mark 13 missile launcher aboard the French Navy frigate Cassard
- Type: Guided Missile Launching System
- Place of origin: United States

Service history
- In service: late 1960s to present
- Used by: United States Navy; Spanish Navy; Royal Australian Navy; French Navy; Royal Netherlands Navy; German Navy; Italian Navy; Polish Navy; Pakistan Navy; Turkish Navy
- Wars: Cold War; Tanker War

Production history
- Designed: 1960s
- Manufacturer: FMC / United Defense / BAE
- Variants: Mark 22

Specifications
- Rate of fire: 1 Standard missile every 8 seconds 1 Harpoon missile every 22 seconds

The Mark 13 guided missile launching system (GMLS) is a single-arm missile launcher designed for use on frigates and other military vessels. Because of its distinctive single-armed design, the Mark 13 is often referred to as the "one-armed bandit".

The Mark 13 is equipped to fire the RIM-66 Standard, RGM-84 Harpoon, and RIM-24 Tartar missiles for anti-air and anti-ship defense, and is capable of firing the Standard at a rate of one every eight seconds. Its 40-round magazine consists of two concentric rings of vertically stored missiles, 24 in the outer ring and 16 in the inner. Total capacity was reduced by 1 due to a requirement to carry a Guided Missile Training Round (GMTR) in order to test system functionality. In case of a fire, the system is equipped with magazine sprinkling, CO_{2} suppression and booster suppression. It is also equipped with a dud jettison function to eject a round overboard if it fails to fire.

== Usage ==
In the United States Navy, the Mark 13 launcher was most typically employed as part of the Mark 74 Guided Missile Launch System, or the Mark 92 Fire Control System. Though the launcher was original armament on U.S. Navy Perry-class frigates (and their derivatives), in order to save costs on an obsolete system, by 2004 all active U.S. Navy vessels have had the system removed. It was also fitted on the French Cassard-class frigates, as well as the two Mitscher-class destroyers converted to DDGs, the last ten American Charles F. Adams-class destroyers, the American California-class cruisers, the German Lütjens-class destroyers and Australian Perth-class destroyers and Adelaide-class frigates, and Dutch Tromp-class frigates and Jacob van Heemskerck-class frigates, and Italian Durand de la Penne-class destroyers.

Due to the end of the US Navy's support of the Mark 13 missile launcher, support for the systems in Taiwanese service was taken up by the National Chung-Shan Institute of Science and Technology. The same approach was taken for the Mark 13’s SM-1.

== Variations ==
The Mark 14 guided missile launching system (GMLS) was a proposed variant of the Mark 13 for launching the larger RIM-55 Typhon MR missile. It was canceled before any were made.

The Mark 22 guided missile launching system (GMLS) is a variation of the Mark 13 launcher which has only the inner 16 round storage ring of the Mark 13 launcher. It was deployed on US-designed, Baleares-class Spanish frigates. and US Navy Brooke class frigates. Another major difference is that on the Mark 22 the magazine is non-rotating. The launcher rotates over the desired missile and it is then hoisted onto the rail. On the Mark 13 the magazine rotates under the launcher.

== Gallery ==
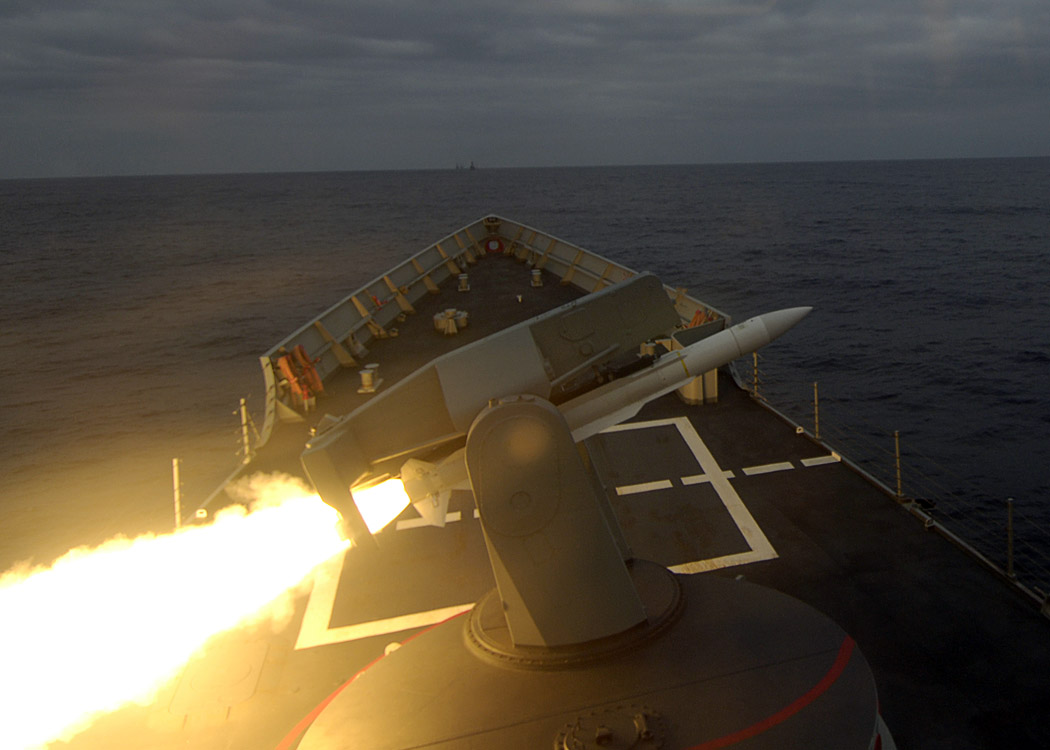
A Standard MR missile being fired from the Mark 13 launcher of Spanish frigate Canarias

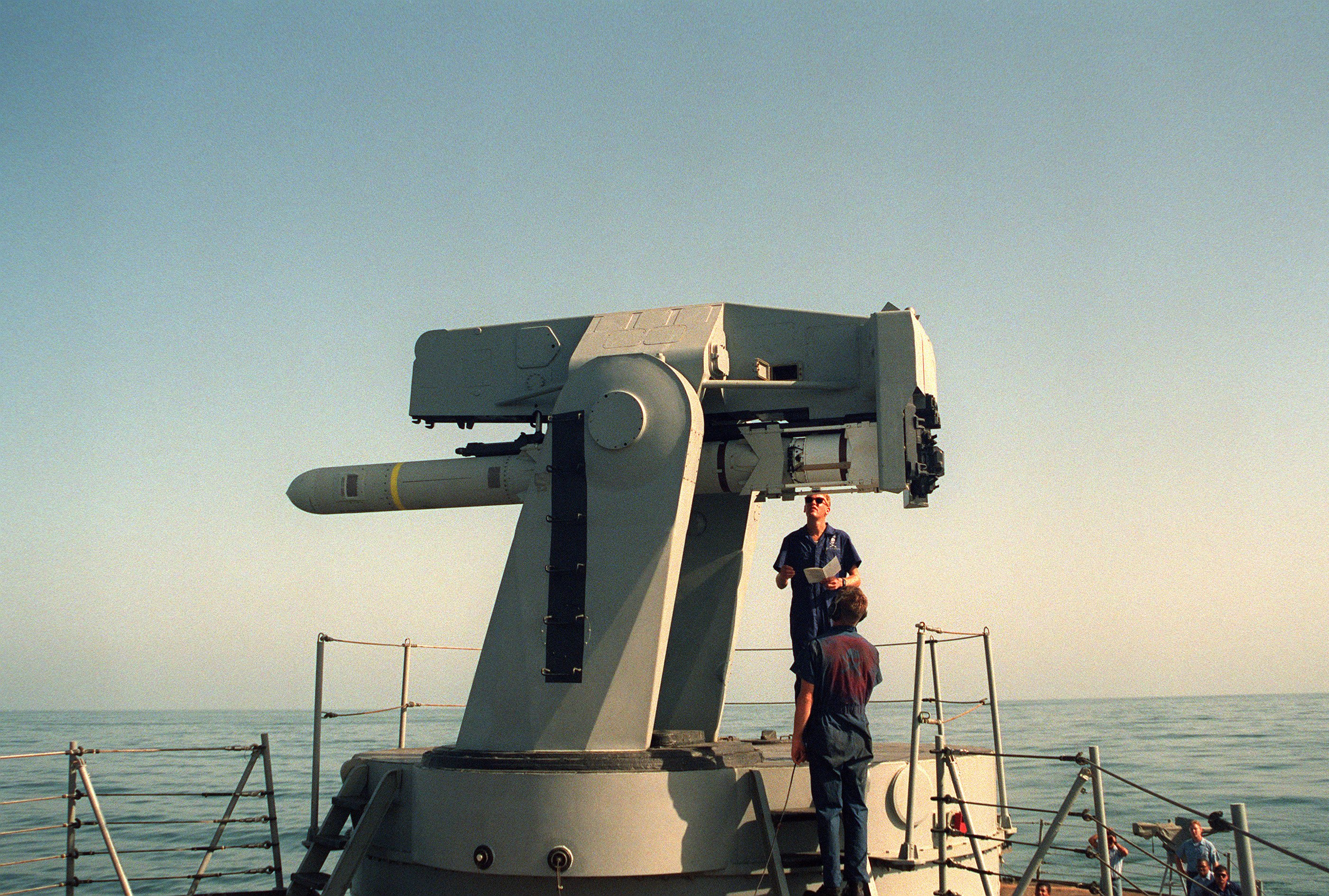
A Harpoon Missile on the rail of a Mark 13 aboard USS Goldsborough

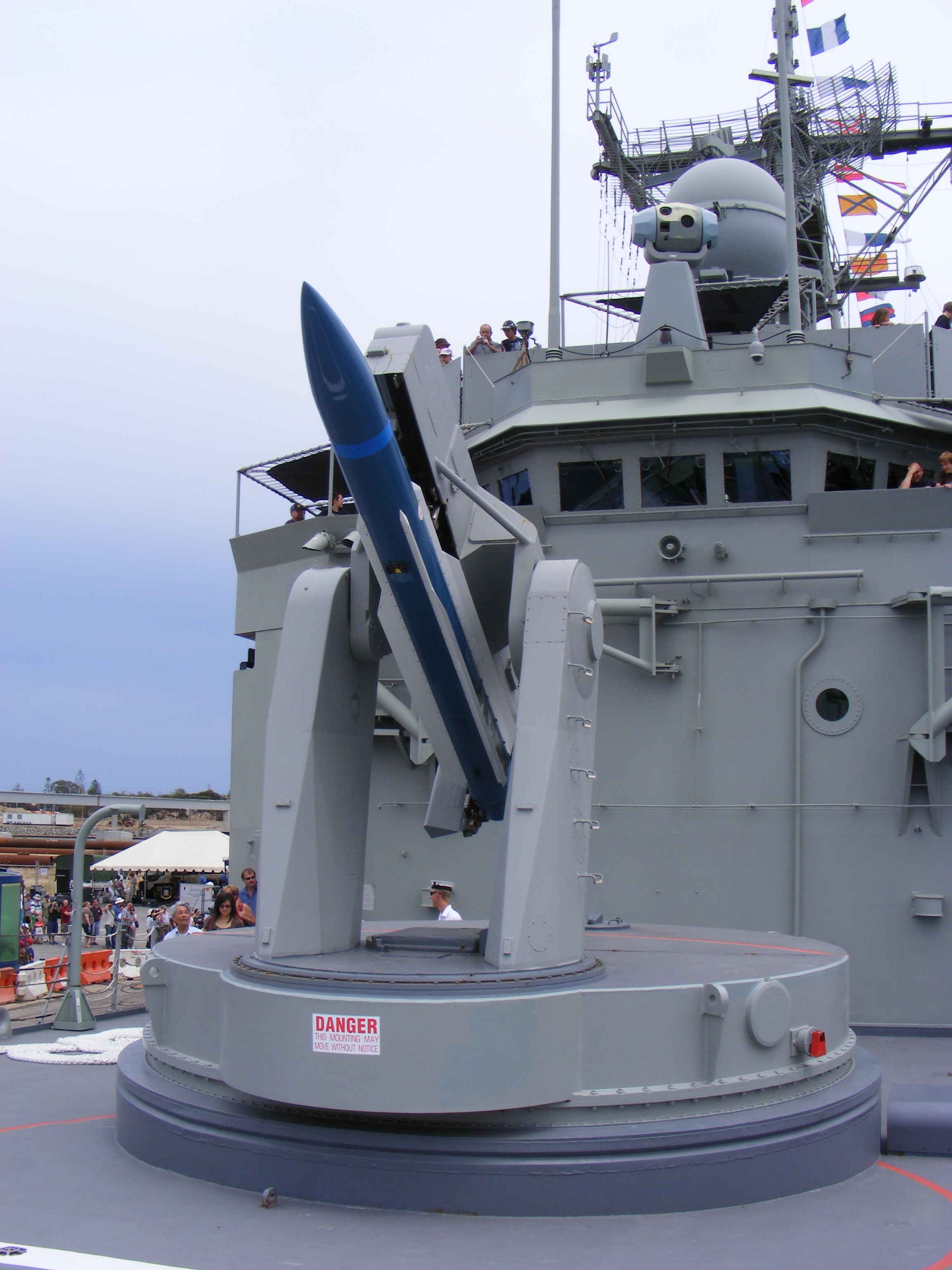
Training round (GMTR) loaded for testing aboard HMAS Adelaide

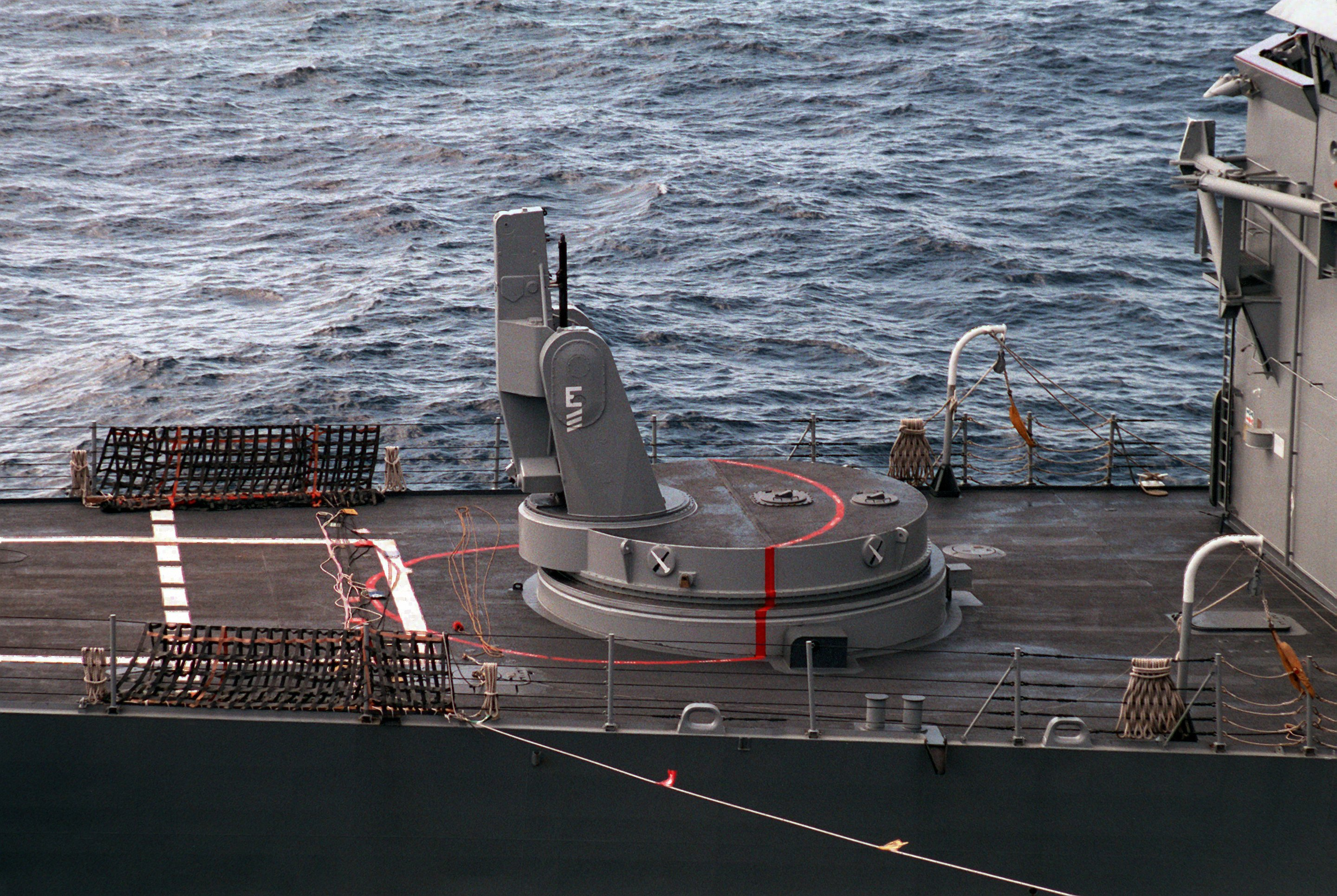
Elevated viewpoint of the Mark 13 launcher aboard USS Doyle

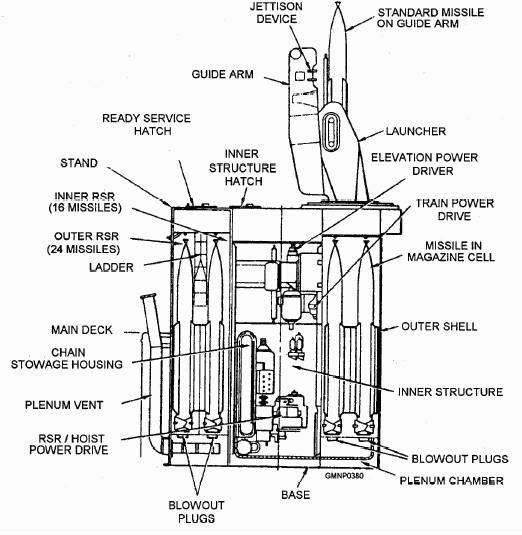
Diagram of the Mark 13 mod 4 GMLS

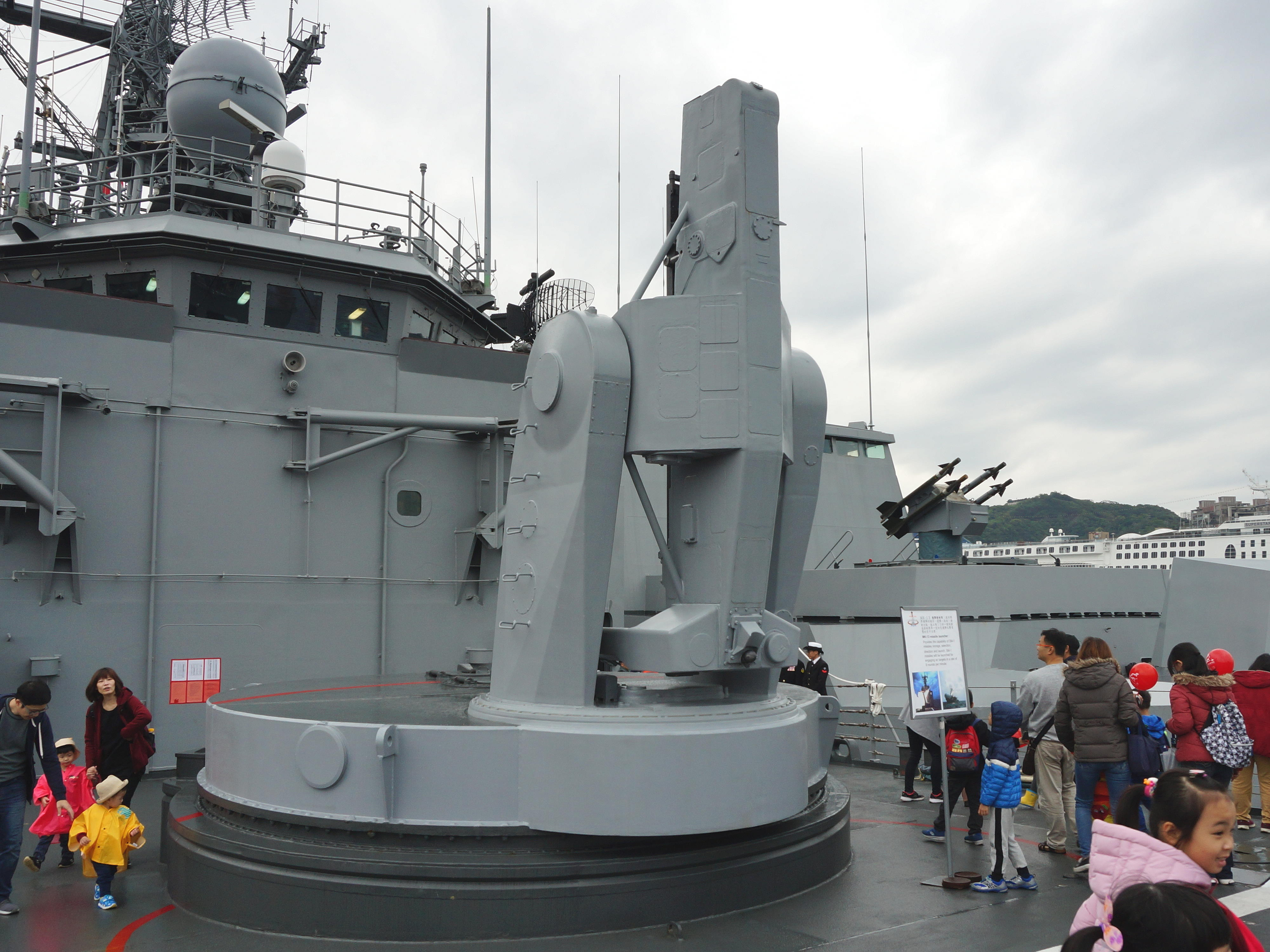
ROCS Tian Dan's Mark 13 launchers

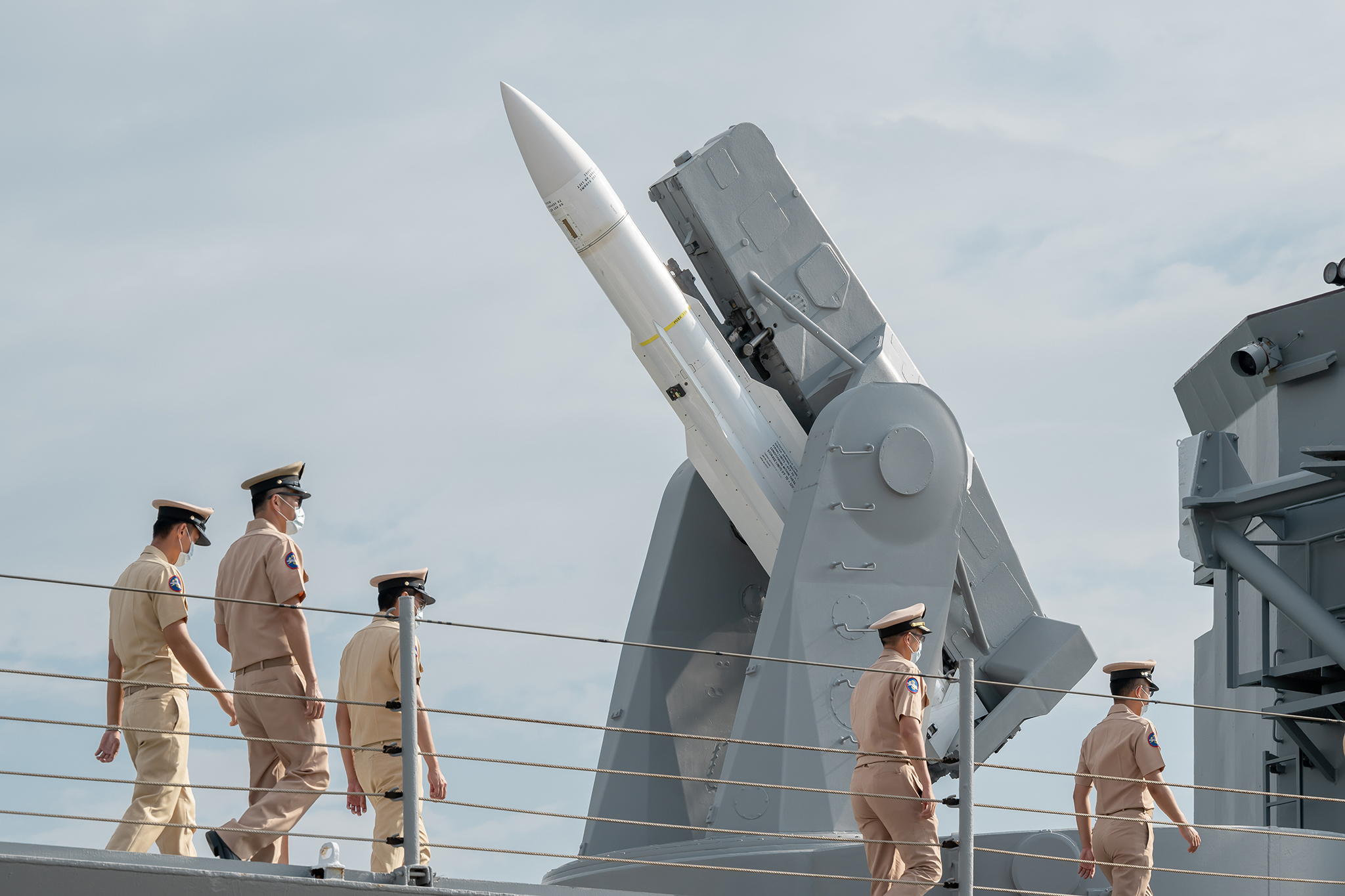
Mark 13 in Taiwanese service in 2022

== See also ==
- List of United States Navy Guided Missile Launching Systems
- Tartar Guided Missile Fire Control System
- M-11 Shtorm Russian counterpart
