= AN/SPS-49 =

Naval 2D long-range air search radar

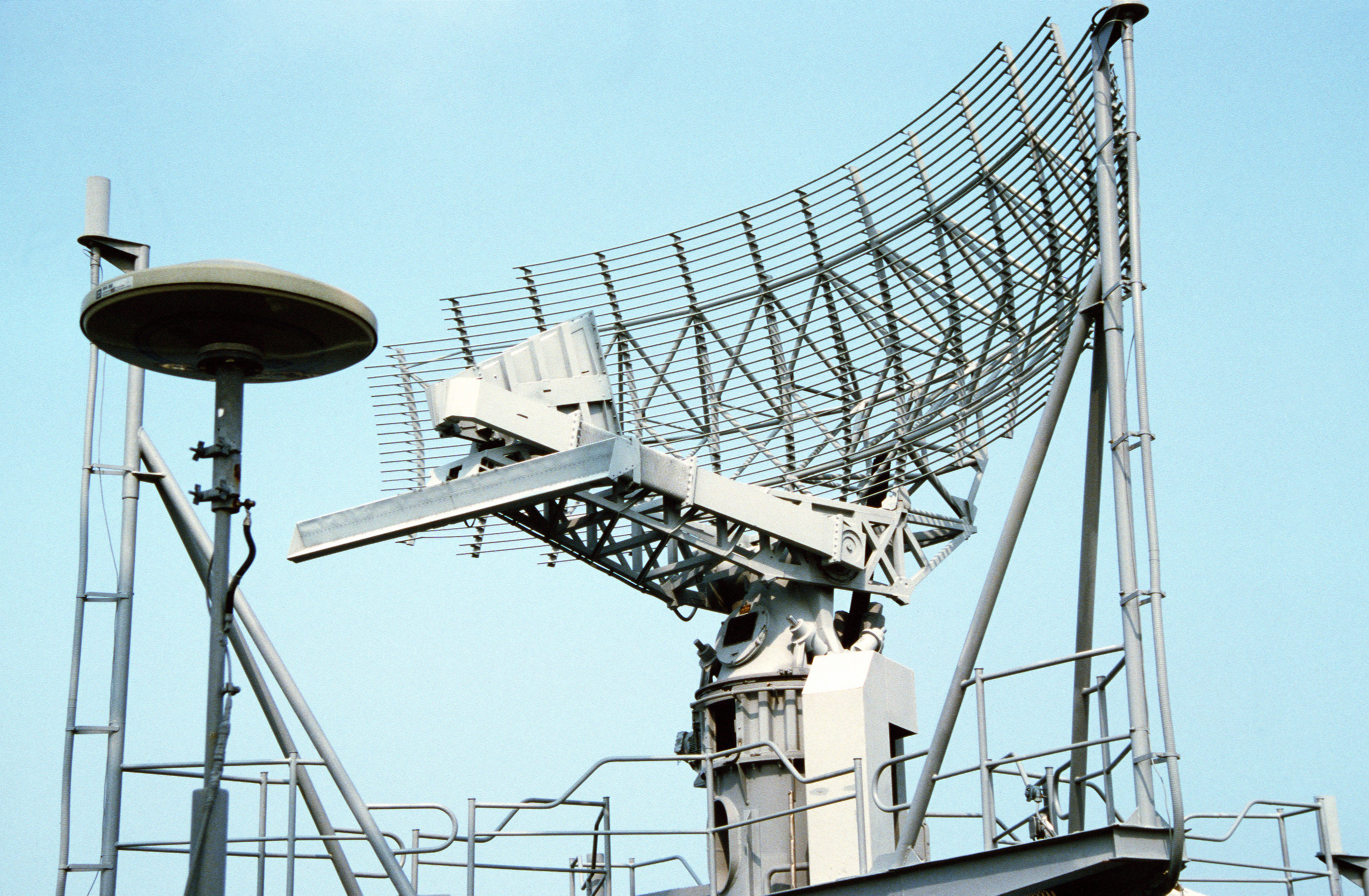
- AN/SPS-49 on USS Abraham Lincoln
- Country of origin: United States
- Introduced: 1975
- No. built: 200+
- Type: 2D Air-search
- Frequency: L band 851–942 MHz
- Range: 3 nmi (5.6 km) to 256 nmi (474 km) (AN/SPS-49A(V)1)
- Altitude: up to 150,000 ft (45,720 m)
- Diameter: 24 ft (7.3 m) × 14 ft 3 in (7.3 m × 4.3 m)
- Azimuth: 0 to 360°
- Precision: 1/16 nmi range 0.5 deg azimuth (SPS-49A(V)1)
- Power: 360 kW peak, 13 kW average (AN/SPS-49A(V)1)

The AN/SPS-49 is a United States Navy two-dimensional, long range air search radar built by Raytheon that can provide contact bearing and range. It is a primary air-search radar for numerous ships in the U.S. fleet and in Spain, Poland, Taiwan aboard Oliver Hazard Perry-class frigates, Canada on its Halifax-class frigate (prior to FELEX mid-life upgrade) and New Zealand on its Anzac-class frigates. It formerly served in a complementary role aboard Aegis cruisers with the AN/SPY-1 but the systems are currently being removed during routine upgrade with no replacement.

In accordance with the Joint Electronics Type Designation System (JETDS), the "AN/SPS-49" designation represents the 49th design of an Army-Navy electronic device for surface ship search radar system. The JETDS system also now is used to name all Department of Defense electronic systems.

== Operation ==
First tested in 1965 aboard USS Gyatt and introduced in 1975, the AN/SPS-49 operates in the 851–942 MHz, or L-, band and has a range of 256 nautical miles (474 km). The orange-peel parabolic shape of the antenna creates a narrow 3.3°-beam to reduce the probability of detection or jamming. It can rotate at 6 rpm in long range mode or 12 rpm in short-range mode. Default is at 12 rpm for the AN/SPS-49A(V)1, to provide more frequent scans against incoming missiles. The SPS-49A(V)1 can detect out to its full range at either 6 or 12 rpm. The antenna is stabilised to compensate for ships pitch and roll, to a maximum of +/-15° for both pitch and roll in 12 rpm mode, and +/-23.5° for both pitch and roll in 6 rpm mode. The output stage of the transmitter in all variants uses a two-cavity klystron amplifier.

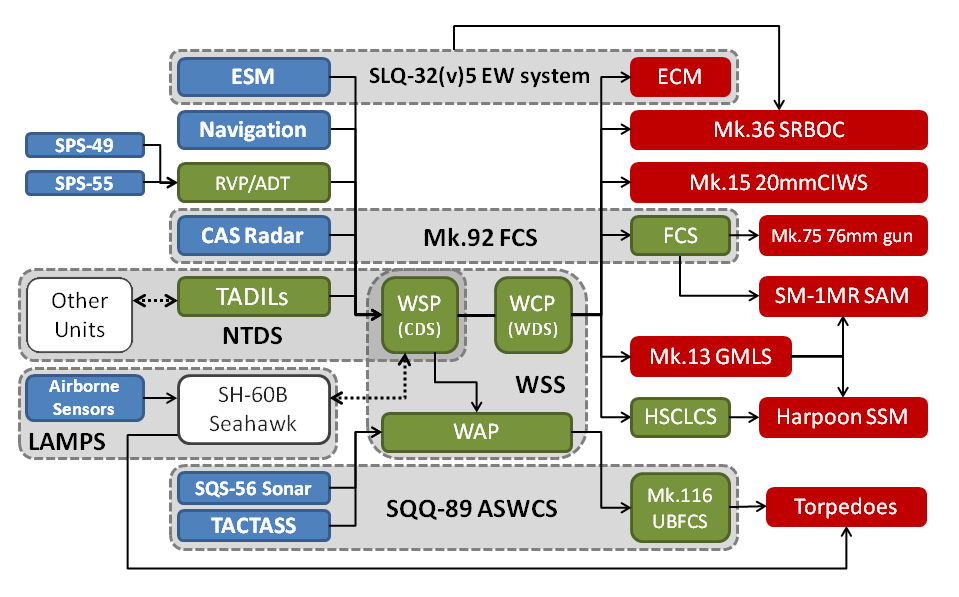
The AN/SPS-49 is part of the combat systems of the Oliver Hazard Perry-class frigate.

In 1998, the Inspector General of the Department of Defense reported that SPS-40 and SPS-49 radars in Bahrain were "unusable because the equipment operates on a frequency that interferes with the Bahrain telecommunications services".

=== On board ships ===
==== United States ====
- Nimitz-class aircraft carrier
- Kitty Hawk-class aircraft carrier
- Iowa-class battleship
- Ticonderoga-class cruiser
- Virginia-class cruiser
- Leahy-class cruiser
- Spruance-class destroyer
- Oliver Hazard Perry-class frigate

==== (Taiwan) Republic of China ====
- Cheng Kung-class frigate

==== Italy ====
- Alpino-class frigate
- Bergamini-class frigate

==== Australia ====
- Adelaide-class frigate
- Anzac-class frigate

==== Canada ====
- Halifax-class frigate

==== New Zealand ====
- Te Kaha-class frigate (Replaced with SMART-S as part of the FSU programme in the early 2020s)

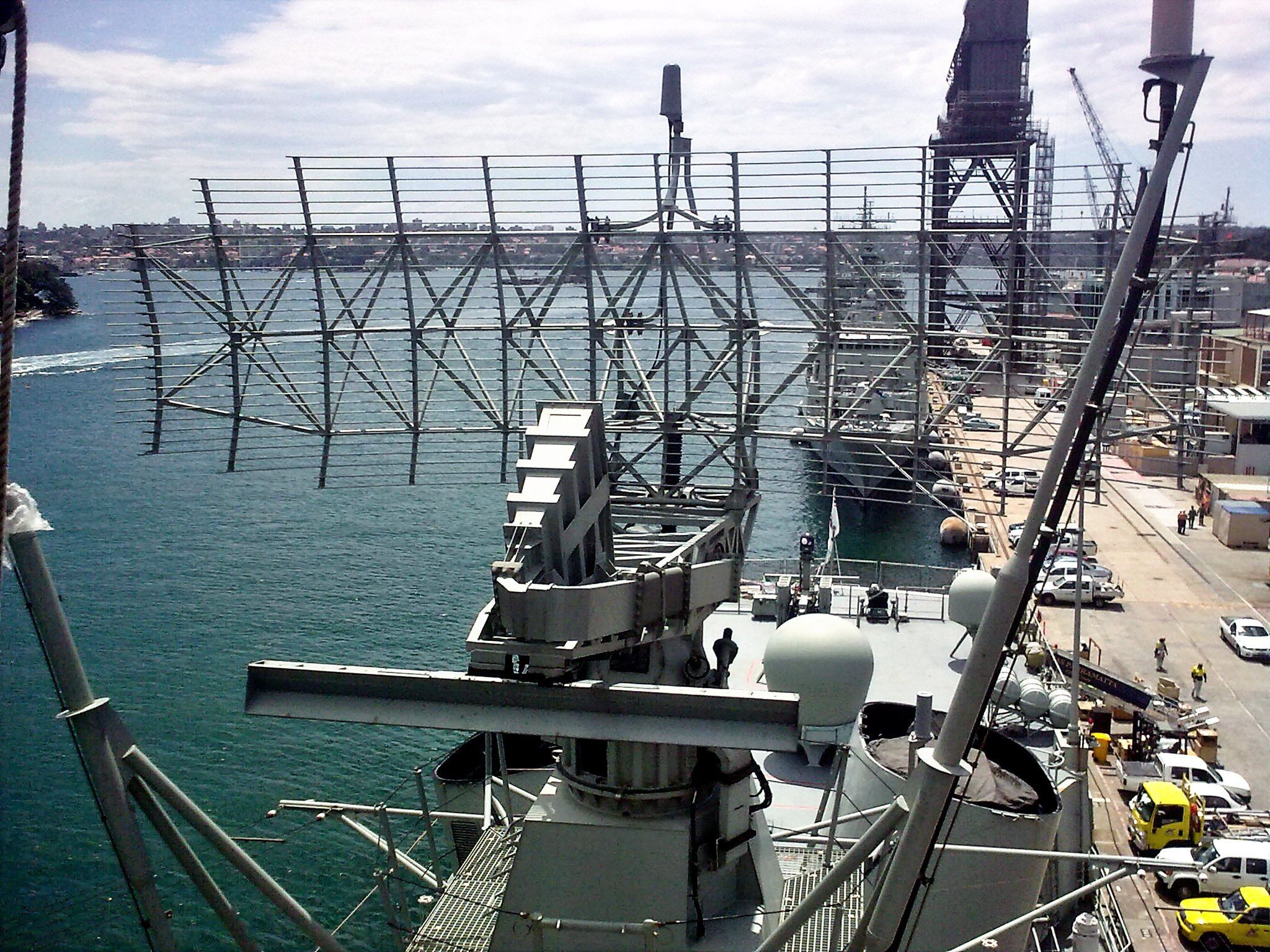
Antenna of an AN/SPS-49(V)8 ANZ radar system on a Royal Australian Navy ANZAC class frigate. The AS-177B/UPX antenna fitted to the rear of the reflector functions as a back-fill radiator for the AS-4328/U IFF interrogator antenna.

==== South Korea ====
- Chungmugong Yi Sun-sin-class destroyer
- Gwanggaeto the Great-class destroyer

== Variants ==
As of 2014, there are eleven configurations of the AN/SPS-49(V).

- AN/SPS-49(V)1: Baseline radar (Various CVN, LHA, LSD and other ships)
- AN/SPS-49(V)2: (V)1 radar without the coherent side lobe cancellation feature (Oliver Hazard Perry-class frigates)
- AN/SPS-49(V)3: (V)1 radar with the radar video processor (RVP) interface (FC-1) (USS Long Beach)
- AN/SPS-49(V)4: (V)2 with the RVP interface (Oliver Hazard Perry-class frigates)
- AN/SPS-49(V)5: (V)1 with automatic target detection (ATD) (New Threat Upgrade (NTU) ships)
- AN/SPS-49(V)6: (V)3 system with double shielded cables and a modified cooling system (USS Ticonderoga)
- AN/SPS-49(V)7: (V)5 system with a (V)6 cooling system (Aegis combat system)
- AN/SPS-49(V)8: (V)5 system enhanced to include the AEGIS Tracker modification kit (Aegis combat system)
- AN/SPS-49(V)8 ANZ: (V)8 system modified to interface with the CelsiusTech 9LV-453 combat system (Anzac-class frigates)
- AN/SPS-49(V)9: (V)5 with medium PRF upgrade (MPU)
- AN/SPS-49A(V)1: Developed in the mid-1990s. Added radial speed determination on each target, each scan. Improved clutter rejection

== See also ==
- List of radars
- List of military electronics of the United States
