= Baleares-class frigate =

1970 class of Spanish frigates

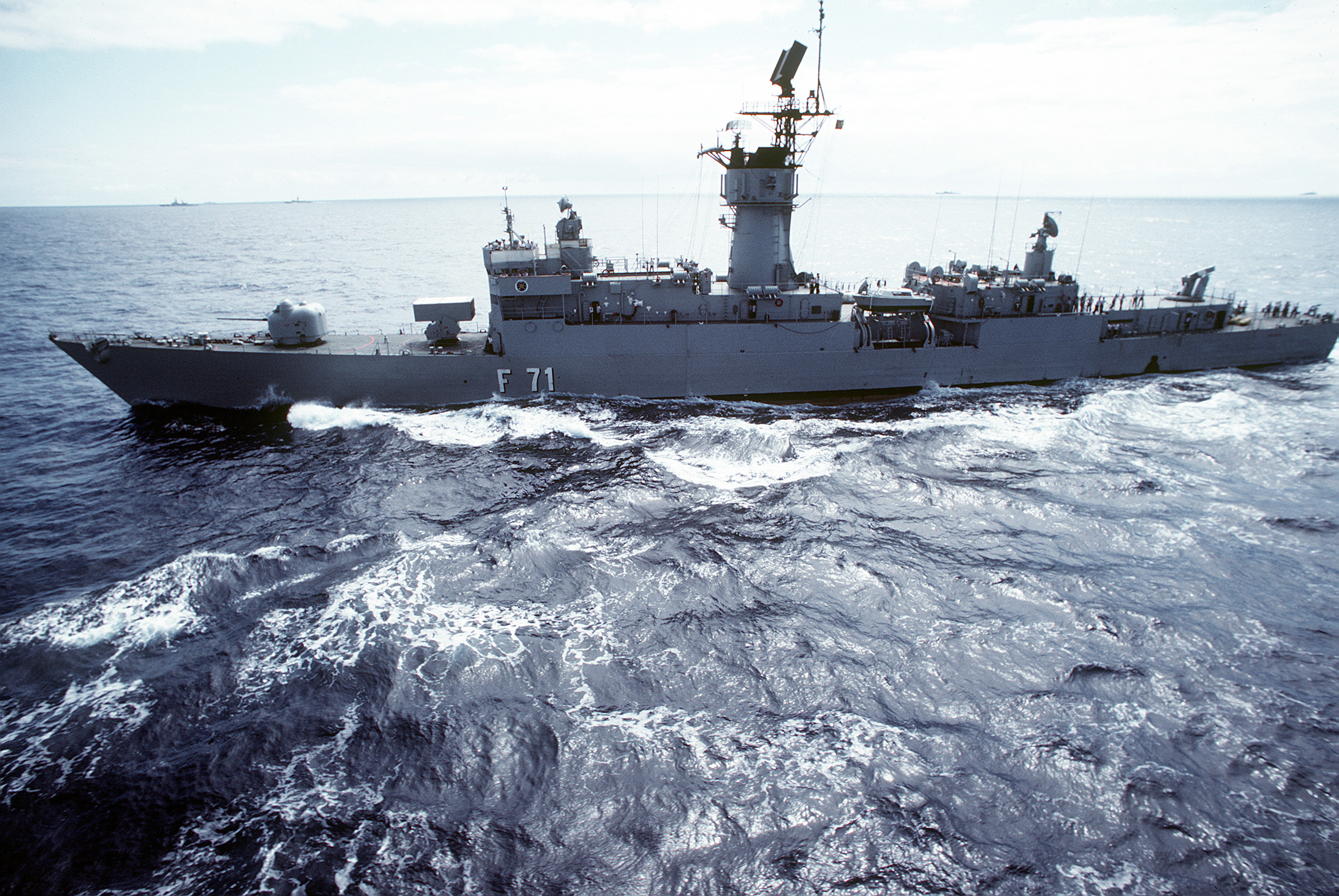
- Baleares during the military exercise Ocean Venture 1981

Class overview
- Name: Baleares class
- Builders: Navantia, Ferrol, Spain
- Operators: Spanish Navy
- Succeeded by: Santa María class
- Built: 1968–1976
- In commission: 1973–2009
- Planned: 5
- Completed: 5
- Retired: 5

General characteristics final version
- Type: Frigate
- Displacement: 3,350 t (3,300 long tons) (standard); 4,177 t (4,111 long tons) (full load)
- Length: 133.6 m (438 ft 4 in)
- Beam: 14.3 m (46 ft 11 in)
- Draught: 7.8 m (25 ft 7 in) max
- Installed power: 2 V2M boilers, total 26,000 kW (35,000 shp)
- Propulsion: 1 shaft, one Westinghouse steam turbine
- Speed: 28 knots (52 km/h; 32 mph)
- Range: 4,500 nmi (8,300 km; 5,200 mi) at 20 kn (37 km/h; 23 mph)
- Complement: 256
- Sensors & processing systems: AN/SPS-52B air search radar; RAN-12L/X air search radar; AN/SPS-10F surface search radar; DE1160LF sonar; AN/SQS-35(v) variable depth sonar system; AN/SPG-53 Mk 68 gun fire control system
- Electronic warfare & decoys: Ceselsa Deneb/Canopus, Mk36 SBROC decoy launchers
- Armament: one Mk 16 8-cell missile launcher for RUR-5 ASROC; one Mk 42 5-inch/54 caliber gun; Mark 46 torpedoes from four single tube launchers); 2 × quad Mk 141 launchers for Harpoon missiles; 1 × Standard SAM launcher (16 missiles); 2 × 20 mm Meroka CIWS gun systems

The Baleares class were a group of five frigates built for the Spanish Navy in the late 1960s and 1970s. The ships were a modified version of the American Knox-class frigates. The key differences are the replacement of helicopter facilities by a medium-range surface-to-air missile system and associated radars. Constructed between 1968 and 1976, the Baleares class began entering service in 1973 and formed the 31 Escort Squadron, based at Ferrol. The five ships were upgraded several times during their service lives. The ships were retired beginning in the mid-2000s and replaced by the Álvaro de Bazán-class frigates on a one-to-one basis.

== Background ==
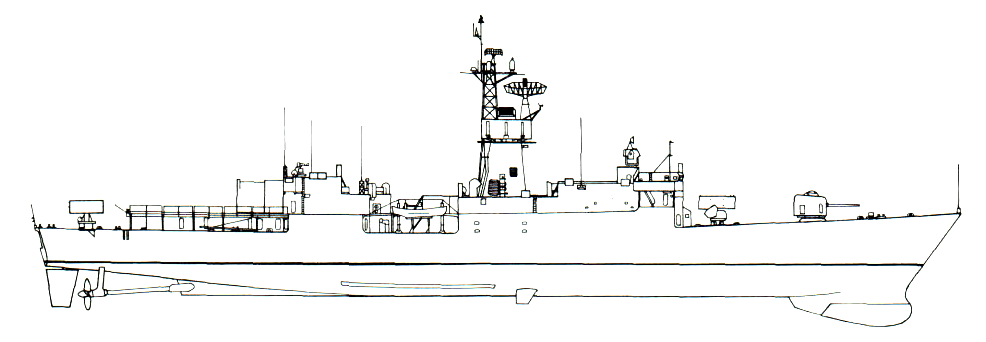
Drawing of a Knox-class frigate as built

In the 1960s, Spain sought to update its fleet of warships. The government entered into negotiations with the United Kingdom for the acquisition of four Leander-class frigates. However, the negotiations failed as questions were raised in the United Kingdom over dealing with the unpopular Spanish government. Instead, the Spanish government turned to the United States and on 17 November 1964 an agreement acquire five Knox-class frigates was signed. On 31 March 1966, a technical support agreement was reached between the two nations. As part of the agreement, the hulls and machinery were to be constructed in Spain at Ferrol while the weapons and sensors would come from the United States. The superstructures were to be built at Alicante, Spain and the boilers, distilling machinery and propellers at Cádiz.

== Design and description ==
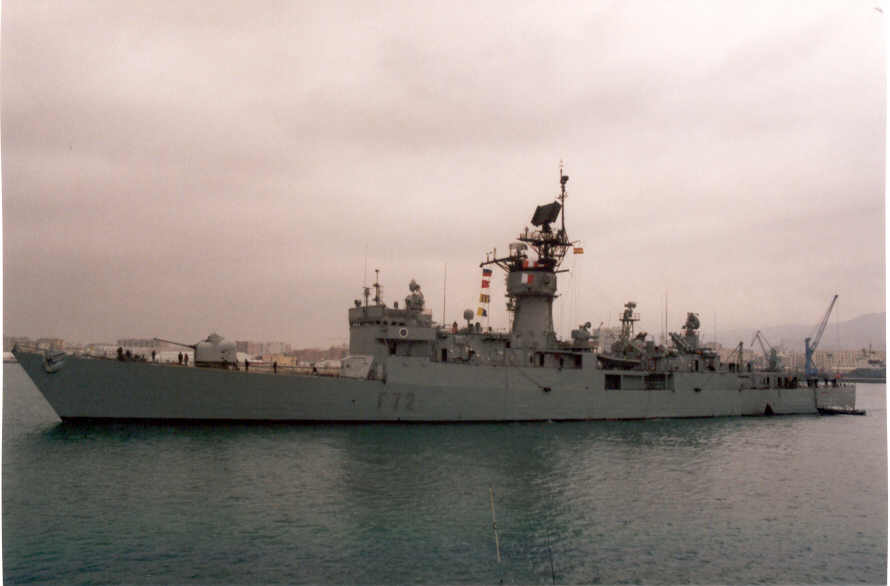
Andalucia

Though copies of the American Knox class, the Baleares class was a modified design. The Spanish frigates removed the aft flight deck and helicopters along with the short-range Sea Sparrow missile defence system and replaced them with the medium-range Standard surface-to-air missile (SAM) system. The frigates of the Baleares class had an initial standard displacement of 3,015 metric tons (2,967 long tons) and a full load displacement of 4,177 t (4,111 long tons). They measured 126.5 metres (415 ft 0 in) long between perpendiculars and 133.5 m (438 ft 0 in) long overall with a beam of 14.3 metres (46 ft 11 in) and a maximum draught of 7.5 m (24 ft 7 in) over the sonar. The ships would go through a series of modifications throughout their service, with their standard displacement increasing to 3,350 t (3,300 long tons) and their draught increasing to 7.8 m (25 ft 7 in) over the sonar. (Note: Couhat has the original standard displacement of the ships as 2,900 t (2,900 long tons).)

The Baleares class were equipped with one Westinghouse geared turbine turning one shaft creating 26,000 kilowatts (35,000 shp). It was powered by steam from by two Combustion Engineering V2M boilers. The boilers had a working pressure of 84.4 kg/cm^{2} (1,200 psi) at 510 °C (950 °F). This gave the Baleares class a maximum speed of 28 knots (52 km/h; 32 mph). They had capacity for 750 metric tons (740 long tons; 830 short tons) of fuel oil giving them a range of 4,500 nautical miles (8,300 km; 5,200 mi) at 20 knots (37 km/h; 23 mph). They had a complement of 256 including 15 officers.

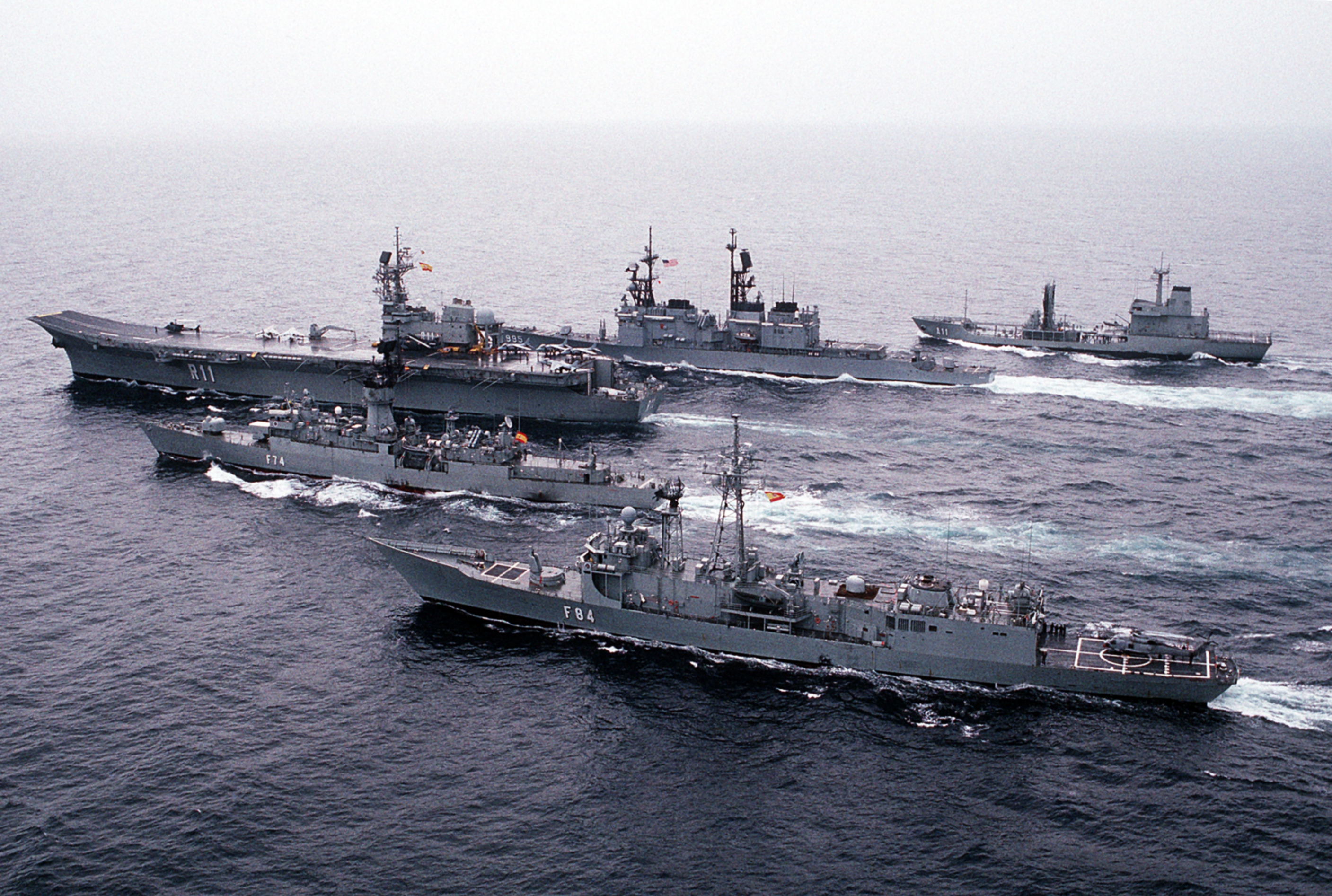
Battle group formed by the aircraft carrier Príncipe de Asturias (centre), Marqués de la Ensenada (top), Asturias (second from bottom), Reina Sofía (bottom) and USS Scott (second from top) in 1992

The frigates were initially armed with one 5-inch (127 mm)/54-calibre Mk 42 naval gun, (Note: /54 calibre denotes the length of the gun. The length of 54-calibre gun is 54 times its bore diameter.) the Standard SM1-MR SAM system with a Mark 22 launcher and 16 missiles and the Mark 112 octuple RUR-5 ASROC anti-submarine warfare system using Mark 46 torpedoes with eight reloads. The frigates also had four 12.75-inch (324 mm) torpedo tubes fitted internally into the port and starboard of the aft superstructure and inclined at 45° for Mark 44 torpedoes and two 21-inch (533 mm) torpedo tubes fitted internally at the stern for Mark 37 torpedoes. The ships stored 41 torpedoes total. The Baleares class underwent a two stage mid-life modernisation between 1985 and 1991 which involved the addition of four Harpoon surface-to-surface missiles in the first stage and two 20-millimetre (0.79 in) Meroka CIWS gun systems in the second stage. They also had their stern torpedo tubes removed to accommodate the variable depth sonar installation.

The frigates initially fitted AN/SPS-52A air search and AN/SPG-51C gun fire control radars along with AN/SQS-23 hull-mounted and AN/SQS-35A variable depth towed sonars. During the first stage modernisation, the ships were given AN/SPS-10F surface search radar and the AN/SPG-53 Mark 68 gun fire control system. The ships were also given upgraded fire control where the Mark 74 system used the Mark 73 director and the SPG-51C radar along with the Mark 68 director with the SPG-53 radar to control two Standard missiles simultaneously. The Mark 68 could also be used to control the main gun. Additionally, the frigates received SRN-15A, TACAN, the TRITAN-1 combat data system and NATO Link 11. During the second stage, the Baleares class received the RAN-12L/X air search radar for the Meroka CIWS system and replaced the original SQS-23 sonar with the DE1160LF sonar. They also saw their electronic warfare suite improved with the addition Mark 36 SBROC decoy launchers.

== Ships in class ==
Baleares class construction data
| Pennant | Name | Builder | Laid down | Launched | Commissioned | Status |
|---|---|---|---|---|---|---|
| F71 | Baleares | Bazan, Ferrol | 31 October 1968 | 20 August 1970 | 24 September 1973 | Decommissioned 2005 |
| F72 | Andalucia | Bazan, Ferrol | 2 July 1969 | 30 March 1971 | 23 May 1974 | Decommissioned 2006 |
| F73 | Cataluna | Bazan, Ferrol | 20 August 1970 | 3 November 1971 | 16 January 1975 | Decommissioned 2004 |
| F74 | Asturias | Bazan, Ferrol | 30 March 1971 | 13 March 1972 | 2 December 1975 | Decommissioned 2009 |
| F75 | Extremadura | Bazan, Ferrol | 3 November 1971 | 21 November 1972 | 10 November 1976 | Decommissioned 2006 |

== See also ==
- List of frigate classes by country

Equivalent frigates of the same era

- Tromp class
- Tourville class
- Type 22
- Oliver Hazard Perry class
- Suffren class
