= Operation Sharp Guard =

Naval blockade of Adriatic, 1993–96

- Part of NATO intervention in Bosnia
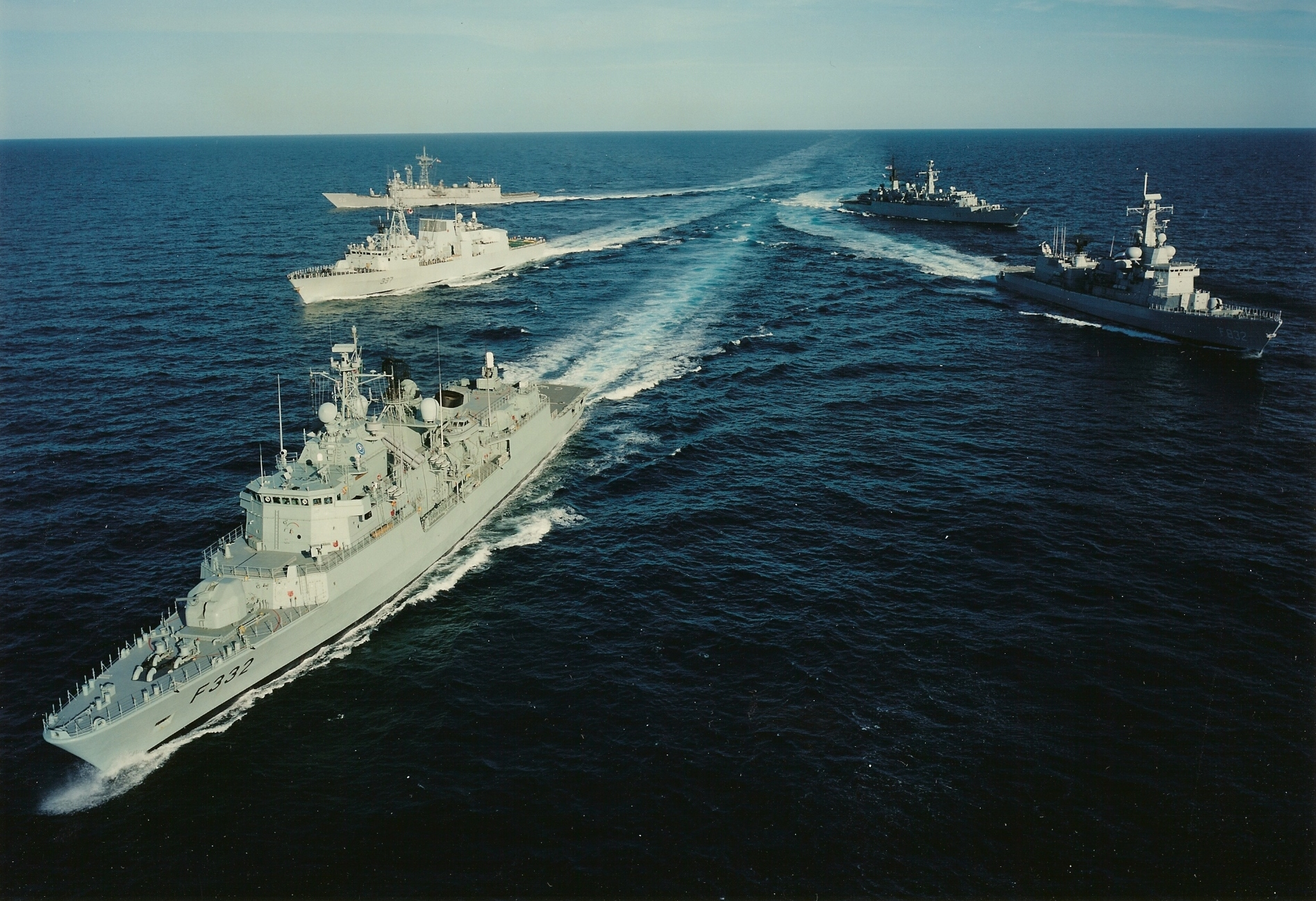
- NATO ships enforcing the blockade in March 1995
- Objective: Blockade former Yugoslavia
- Date: 15 June 1993 – 2 October 1996
- Executed by: Western European Union; NATO

Operation Sharp Guard was a joint naval blockade in the Adriatic Sea by NATO and the Western European Union on shipments to the former Yugoslavia in the mid 1990's. Warships and maritime patrol aircraft from 14 countries were involved in searching for and stopping blockade runners. The operation began on 15 June 1993. It was suspended on 19 June 1996, and was terminated on 2 October 1996.

== Background ==
The operation replaced naval blockades Operation Maritime Guard (of NATO; begun by the U.S. in November 1992) and Sharp Fence (of the WEU). It put them under a single chain of command and control (the "Adriatic Military Committee", over which the NATO and WEU Councils exerted joint control), to address what their respective Councils viewed as wasteful duplication of effort. Some maintain that despite the nominal official joint command and control of the operation, in reality it was NATO staff that ran the operation.

== Purpose ==
The operation's purpose was, through a blockade on shipments to the former Yugoslavia, to enforce economic sanctions and an arms embargo of weapons and military equipment against the former Federal Republic of Yugoslavia, and rival factions in Croatia and Bosnia. The Yugoslav Wars were being waged, and the participants of the blockade hoped to limit the fighting and destruction by limiting supplies being imported into the area.

== Blockade ==
Fourteen nations contributed ships and patrol aircraft to the operation. At any given time, 22 ships and 8 aircraft were enforcing the blockade, with ships from Standing Naval Force Atlantic and Standing Naval Force Mediterranean establishing a rotating duty. (Belgium, Canada, Denmark, France, Germany, Greece, Italy, the Netherlands, Norway, Portugal, Spain, Turkey, the U.K., and the U.S.), and eight maritime patrol aircraft, were involved in searching for and stopping blockade runners. Most contributors to the operation supplied one or two ships. The Turkish Navy, for example, participated with frigates, submarines, and tankers.

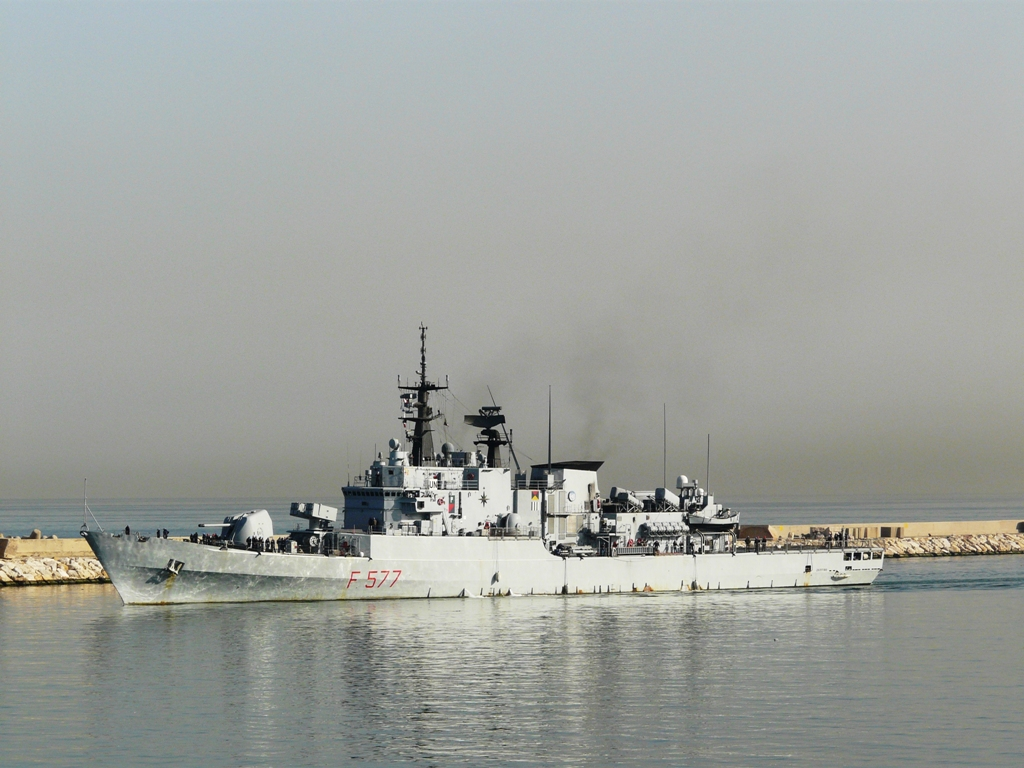
Italian frigate Zeffiro

The operational area was divided into a series of "sea boxes", each the responsibility of a single warship. Each boarding team was composed of a "guard team" to board and wrest control of the target ship, and a "search team", to conduct the search.

The ships were authorized to board, inspect, and seize both ships seeking to break the blockade and their cargo. The Combined Task Force 440 was commanded by Admiral Mario Angeli of Italy. It marked the first time since its founding in 1949 that NATO was involved in combat operations.

=== Jadran Express incident ===
On 11 March 1994, a combined British and Italian intelligence operation led to the capture of the Maltese merchant ship Jadran Express by the Italian frigate Zeffiro, which forced the freighter into the port of Taranto. The ship had departed from Odesa bound to Venice with a cache of 2,000 tons of Soviet-designed weaponry, valued at US$200 million. Crewed by a boarding party of Italian marines from the San Marco battalion, the Jadran Express was eventually escorted by Zeffiro to the naval base of La Maddalena, where her cargo was unloaded under heavy security.

=== Lido II incident ===
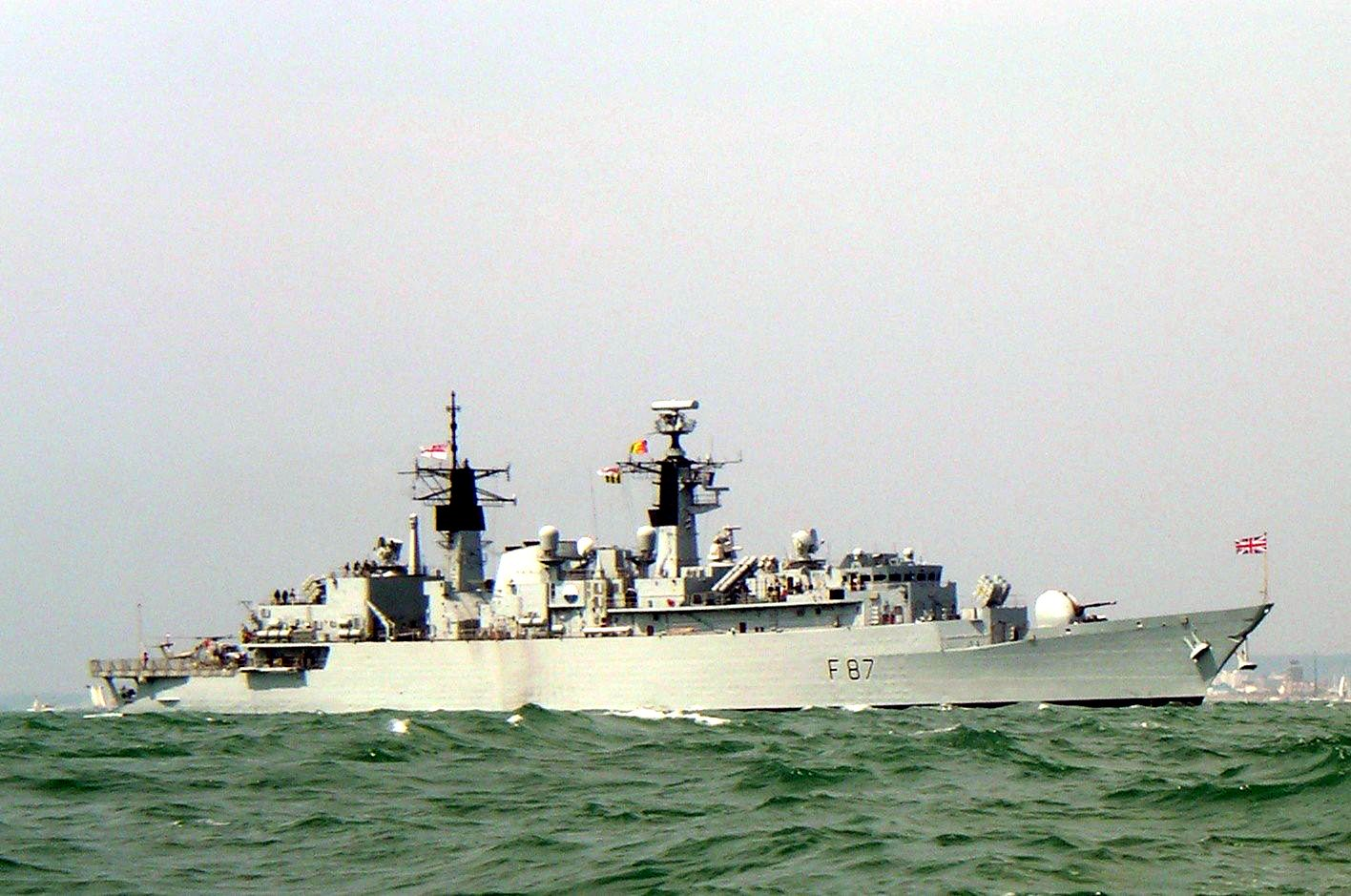
Type 22 frigate HMS Chatham

The issue of differing views among nations in the coalition as to the use of force authorized by rules of engagement arose on 30 April 1994. Faced with the Maltese tanker Lido II making its way towards a Montenegrin port with 45,000 tons of fuel oil, the American cruiser USS Philippine Sea asked the NATO commander (a British Commodore) for guidance, and received authorization to use "disabling fire" to stop the tanker, if necessary. He received confirmation that he should follow the British commodore's guidance from his own higher authority. Under U.S. Navy standards, "disabling fire" means firing rounds into the ship's engineering space. The U.S. cruiser was about to pass the order along to the Dutch Kortenaer-class frigate HNLMS Van Kinsbergen. However, the fact that the Dutch definition of "disabling fire" involves launching rounds into the bridge of the target ship, with an increased risk of loss of life, became important. The ship was boarded by Dutch Marines inserted by helicopter from Van Kinsbergen and eventually stopped without firing a shot on the first of May. Three Yugoslav Navy Končar-class corvettes challenged the NATO operation and one of them tried to ram the British frigate HMS Chatham as it was assisting Van Kinsberger. The corvettes eventually fled following the reaction of the British warship, supported by Italian Tornado aircraft which scrambled from an airbase at Gioia Del Colle. Lido II had to undergo repairs before being diverted to Italy, since the crew had sabotaged the ship's engine room. The leaking was contained by an engineer party from HMS Chatham. Seven Yugoslav stowaways, all of them members of the special forces of the Yugoslav Navy, were found on board. A similar incident had taken place off Montenegro a year before, on 8 February 1993, when a boarding party from the Italian frigate Espero forcibly seized the Maltese freighter Dimitrakis, which feigned an emergency in order to divert her route to the port of Bar. The merchant was smuggling coal to the Serbs from Romania.

=== Suspension ===
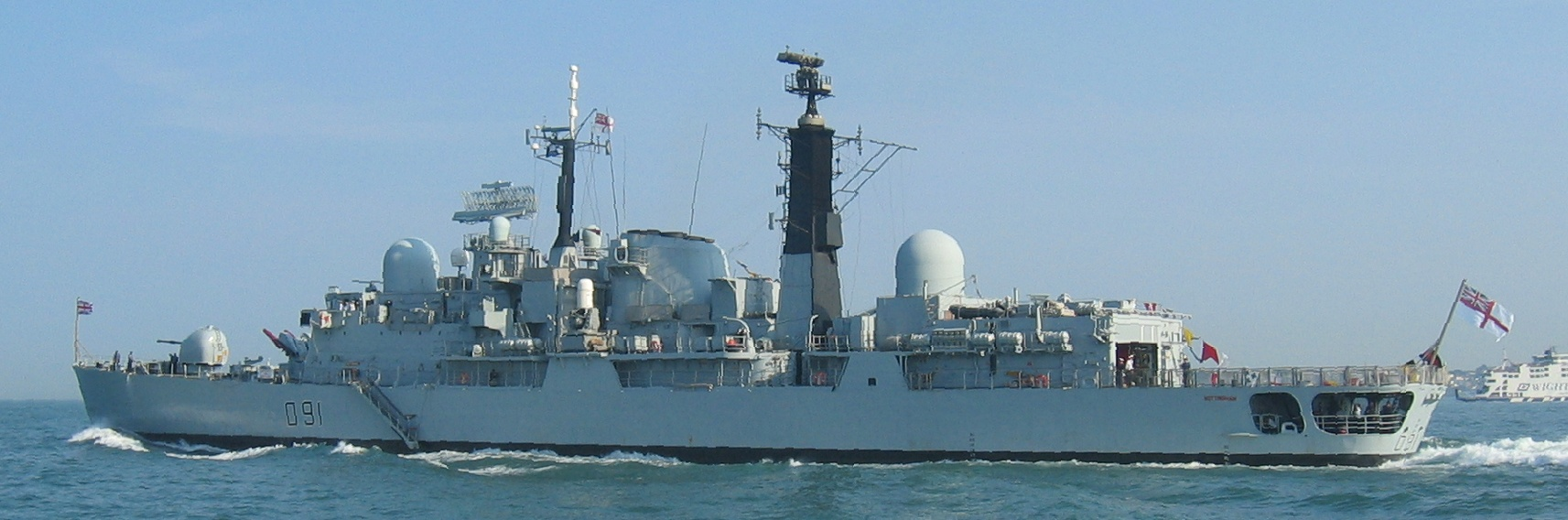
HMS Nottingham

The blockade was suspended following a UN decision to end the arms embargo, and NATO's Southern Command said that: "NATO and WEU ships will no longer challenge, board or divert ships in the Adriatic". The Independent warned at the time that "In theory, there could now be a massive influx of arms to Bosnia, Croatia and the Federal Republic of Yugoslavia (Serbia and Montenegro), although senior military and diplomatic sources yesterday said that they thought this would be unlikely."

NATO naval forces inspected 5800 ships at sea. Of them, 1400 were diverted and inspected in port. No vessels were reported as having broken the embargo, although six were seized while attempting to do so.

== Applicable UN resolutions ==
The blockade was conducted in accordance with numerous United Nations Security Council Resolutions: UNSCR 713, UNSCR 757, UNSCR 787 UNSCR 820, and UNSCR 943. Resolution 787 authorized participating states to "use such measures ... as may be necessary ... to halt all inward and outward maritime shipping ... to insure strict implementation of" the arms embargo and economic sanctions against the former Yugoslavia. Over the course of the operation, the blockade was redefined in accordance with UNSCR 1021 and UNSCR 1022.

== Ships participating (Extract) ==
- Belgian Navy:
  - Westhinder
  - Wandelaar
- Canadian Forces Maritime Command:
  - HMCS Algonquin
  - HMCS Huron
  - HMCS Iroquois
  - HMCS Preserver
  - HMCS Protecteur
  - HMCS Toronto
  - HMCS Ville de Quebec
  - HMCS Fredericton
- Royal Danish Navy:
  - HDMS Niels Juel
- French Navy:
  - Commandant Blaison
  - Jean Bart
  - La Fayette
  - Premier Maitre L'HER
  - CDT de Pimodan
- German Navy:
  - Emden
  - Rheinland-Pfalz
  - Rommel
  - Niedersachsen
- Hellenic Navy:
  - Elli
  - Hydra
  - Themistoklis
  - Thraki
- Italian Navy:
  - Espero
  - Euro
  - Fenice
  - Libeccio
  - Grecale
  - Luigi Durand de la Penne
  - Lupo
  - Zeffiro
- Royal Netherlands Navy:
  - HNLMS Jacob van Heemskerk
  - HNLMS Jan van Brakel
  - HNLMS Karel Doorman
  - HNLMS Abraham van der Hulst
  - HNLMS Philips van Almonde
  - HNLMS Piet Hein
  - HNLMS Pieter Florisz
  - HNLMS Bloys van Treslong (F824)
  - HNLMS Van Kinsbergen
  - HNLMS Witte de With
  - HNLMS Zuiderkruis (A832)
  - HNLMS De Ruyter (F806)
- Portuguese Navy:
  - NRP Vasco da Gama
- Spanish Navy:
  - Andalucia
  - Asturias
  - Extremadura
  - Numancia
  - Reina Sofía
- Royal Norwegian Navy:
  - HNoMS Trondheim
  - HNoMS Narvik
- Turkish Navy:
  - TCG Ege
  - TCG Kocatepe
- Royal Navy:
  - HMS Battleaxe
  - HMS Brilliant
  - HMS Brazen
  - HMS Campbeltown
  - HMS Chatham
  - HMS Cumberland
  - HMS Edinburgh
  - HMS Glasgow
  - HMS Nottingham
  - HMS Beaver
  - RFA Orangeleaf
  - HMS Birmingham (D86)
- U.S. Navy:
  - USS America
  - USS Anzio
  - USS Arthur W. Radford
  - USS Bainbridge
  - USS Boone
  - USS Boston
  - USS Cincinnati
  - USS Cape St. George
  - USS Comte de Grasse
  - USS Conolly
  - USS Dale
  - USS Deyo
  - USS Dwight D. Eisenhower
  - USS Edenton
  - USS Elrod
  - USS Groton
  - USS John Rodgers
  - USS Josephus Daniels
  - USS Hue City
  - USS Kauffman
  - USS Kidd
  - USS Mississippi
  - USS Mitscher
  - USS Monterey
  - USS Nassau
  - USS Nicholas
  - USS Normandy
  - USS Pensacola
  - USS Peterson
  - USS Platte
  - USS Ponce
  - USS Saipan
  - USS Samuel B. Roberts
  - USS Scott
  - USS Simpson
  - USS South Carolina
  - USS Thomas S. Gates
  - USS Ticonderoga
  - USS Trepang (SSN-674)
  - USS Theodore Roosevelt
  - USS Thorn
  - USS Vicksburg
  - USS Yorktown
  - USNS Kanawha

== See also ==
- Yugoslav Wars
- Legal assessments of the Gaza flotilla raid
