= Spanish oiler Patiño =

Replenishment oiler of the Spanish Navy

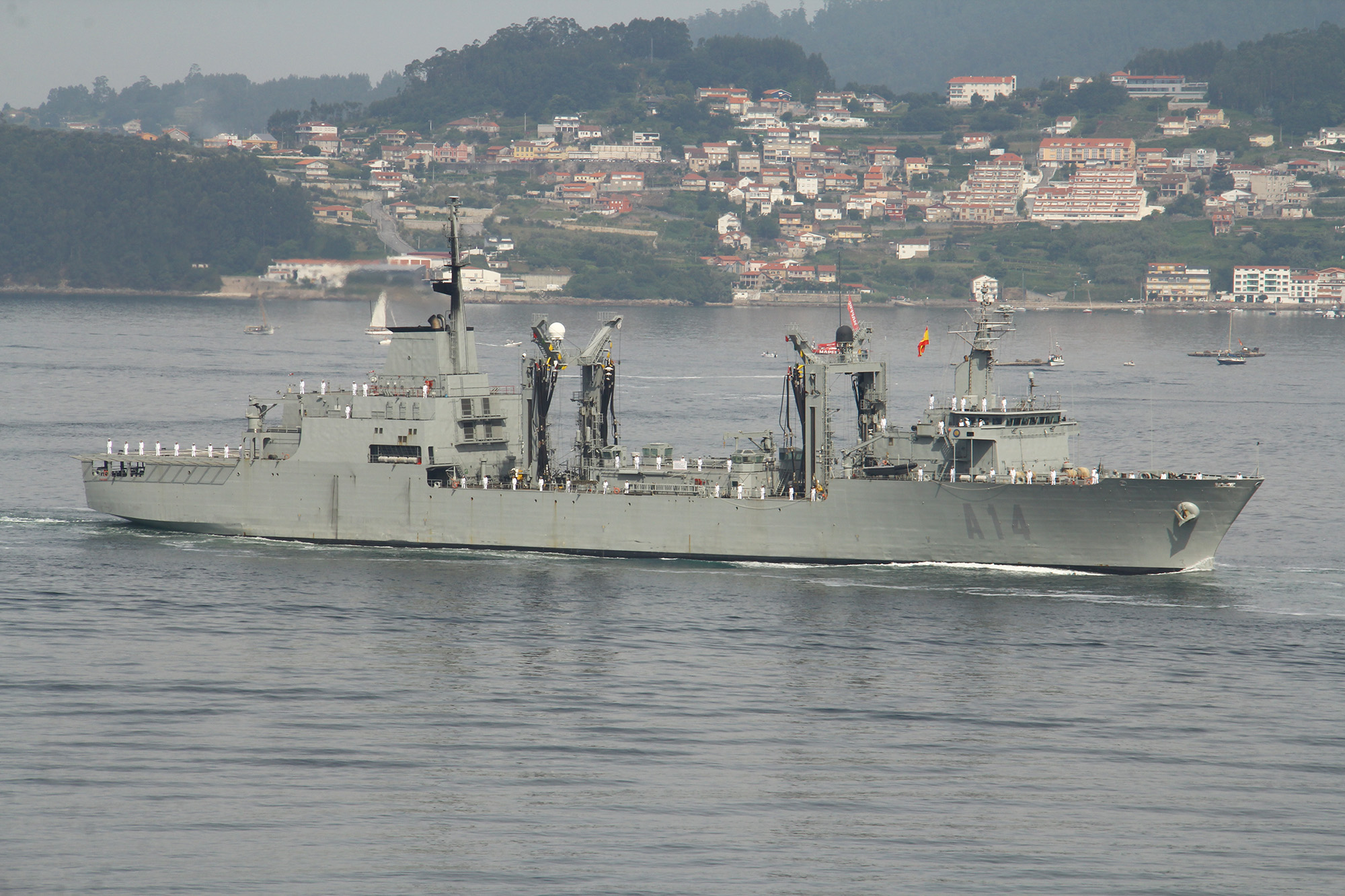
- Patiño in 2017

History

Spain
- Name: Patiño
- Namesake: José Patiño Rosales
- Ordered: 26 December 1991
- Builder: Navantia, Ferrol, Spain
- Launched: 22 June 1994
- Commissioned: 16 June 1995
- Home port: Ferrol
- Identification: Pennant number: A14; MMSI number: 224503000; Callsign: EBBZ
- Status: Active

General characteristics
- Type: Replenishment oiler
- Displacement: 17,045 long tons (17,319 t) full load; 5,762 long tons (5,854 t)
- Length: 166 m (544 ft 7 in)
- Beam: 22 m (72 ft 2 in)
- Draught: 8 m (26 ft 3 in)
- Installed power: 2 × Navantia/Burmeister & Wain 16V40/45 diesel engines; 24,000 hp (17,897 kW)
- Propulsion: 1 × controllable pitch propeller
- Speed: 20 knots (37 km/h; 23 mph)
- Range: 13,440 nmi (24,891 km; 15,466 mi) at 20 knots
- Complement: 148, plus 19 air crew, plus 20 extra
- Sensors & processing systems: 2 × Decca 2690 navigation radar; EID ICCS 3 integrated communications control
- Electronic warfare & decoys: URN-25A TACAN Aldebaran ESM / ECM system
- Armament: 2 × Oerlikon 20 mm cannon; 2 × Izar FABA Systems Meroka 20 mm close-in weapon system
- Aircraft carried: 2 × SH-3D Sea King or 3 × AB 212
- Aviation facilities: 490 m^{2} (5,300 sq ft) flight deck and hangar

Patiño is a replenishment oiler of the Spanish Navy. It was named after the Spanish navy minister José Patiño Rosales, who reorganized the fleet on the orders of Philip V of Spain. The vessel was ordered in 1991 from Navantia and built at their yard in Ferrol, Galicia. The ship entered service with the Spanish Navy in June 1995 and is homeported at Ferrol. Patiño has been deployed with NATO forces around the world, participating in missions in the Kosovo War, the War in Afghanistan along with the European Union's anti-piracy mission to Somalia.

== Overview ==
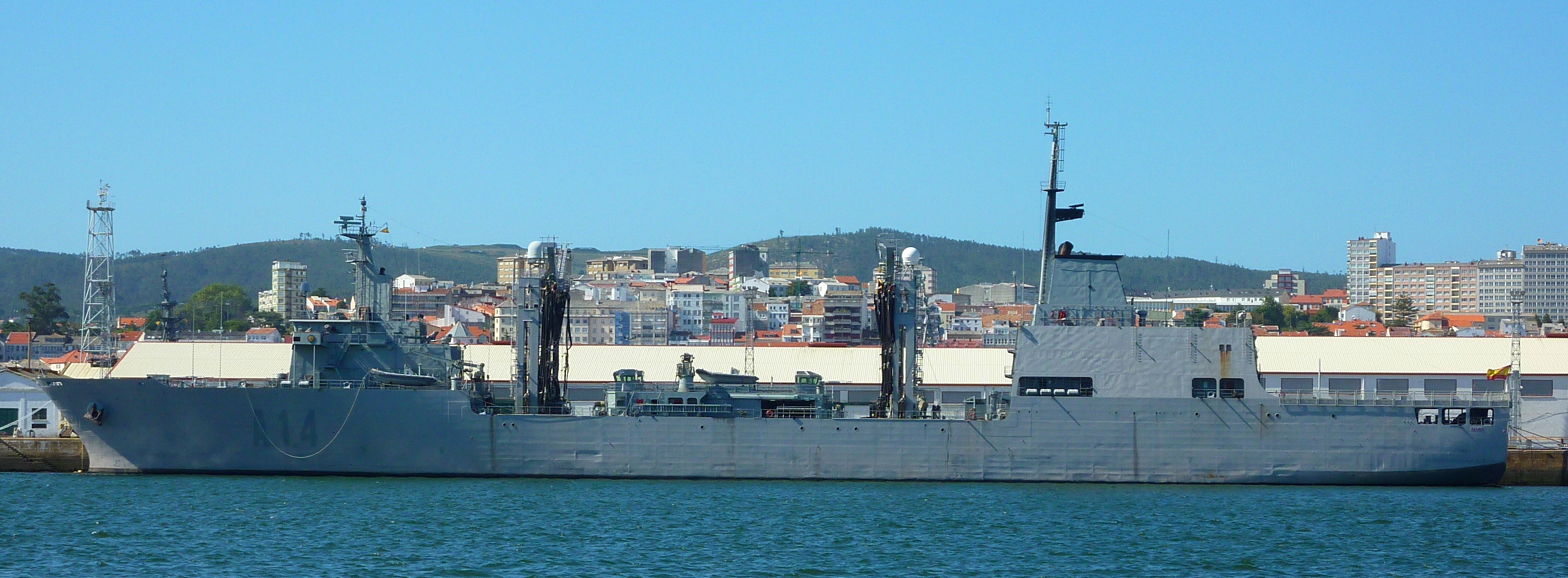
Patiño at the Spanish naval base at Ferrol

=== Design ===
Patiño is a product of cooperation between the Royal Netherlands Navy and the Spanish Navy. The design of the ship is similar to HNLMS Amsterdam of the Royal Netherlands Navy, the vessels were developed in cooperation. The replenishment oiler was built to merchant ship standards. Patiño is 166 m (544 ft 7 in) long with a beam of 22 m (72 ft 2 in) and a draught of 8 m (26 ft 3 in). The ship has a full load displacement of 17,045 long tons (17,319 t) and is 5,762 long tons (5,854 t) light.

Patiño is fitted with two Navantia / Burmeister & Wain 16V40/45 diesel engines driving a single shaft with a five-bladed controllable-pitch propeller. The engines are rated at 24,000 hp (17,897 kW). This gives the vessel a maximum speed of 20 knots (37 km/h; 23 mph) and a range of 13,450 nautical miles (24,909 km; 15,478 mi) at 20 knots.

The replenishment oiler is fitted with three navigation-surface search and helicopter control radars operating at I-band. The management of the ships communications is made through the Integrated Communications Control System (ICCS 3rd generation) from the Portuguese EID. The countermeasures equipment aboard Patiño include: four Mk 36 SRBOC (super rapid blooming offboard chaff), six-barrelled launchers from Lockheed Martin Sippican for infrared decoys and chaff, distraction and deflection of incoming anti-ship missiles to a range of 4 kilometres (2 nmi); an AN/SLQ-25A Nixie towed torpedo decoy system from Argon ST. The two towed units emit acoustic signals from an onboard transmitter. The vessel is also equipped with an Aldebaran Electronic Support Measures / Electronic Countermeasures (ESM / ECM) system from Spain's Indra Group.

=== Armament and aircraft ===
Patiño's weapons system include two Oerlikon 20 mm/90 calibre guns and the vessel is fitted for two Izar FABA Systems Meroka 20 mm/120 calibre close-in weapon system (CIWS). (Note: The 90 calibre denotes the length of the gun. This means that the length of the gun barrel is 90 times the bore diameter.) The guns have a rate of fire of 1,440 rounds per minute and range of up to 2,000 metres (2,187 yd). The Meroka CIWS includes an infrared camera and video auto-tracker.

Patiño is designed to carry up to five helicopters. The vessel has a 490 m^{2} (5,300 sq ft) flight deck and a hangar on the stern of the ship. The replenishment oiler has a normal complement of only three Sikorsky SH-3 Sea Kings with 19 air crew provided. However, the vessel can carry a maximum of two Sea Kings and three AB 212 helicopters at the same time.

=== Capabilities ===
The replenishment oiler carries 6,815 long tons (6,924 t) of diesel fuel and has two supply stations, one on each side of the ship for liquids and solids. The ship is also capable of stern refuelling. Patiño carries 1,660 long tons (1,687 t) of aviation fuel and has a 500-long-ton (508 t) capacity for solid stores. The ship has one vertical replenishment supply station and has aircraft maintenance workshops. Patiño is equipped with medical facilities.

== Service history ==
Patiño was ordered from Navantia on 26 December 1991 after this joint Spanish/Dutch design won over the solely Spanish AP 21 design. The vessel was laid down at Navantia's shipyard in Ferrol, Galicia and launched on 22 June 1994. Patiño was commissioned into the Spanish Navy on 16 June 1995.

Patiño participated in Operation Sharp Guard, a joint mission between the Western European Union and NATO to support the trade embargo against the former Yugoslavia. In 1998, Patiño participated in Operation Allied Action during the Kosovo War. Patiño was also involved in a long series of international naval exercises such as Joint Warrior and Seattle Mariner and has also sailed as part of the NATO Standing NATO Maritime Group 1 (SNMG1) and Standing NATO Maritime Group 2 (SNMG2).

=== Operation Enduring Freedom ===
In 2002, Patiño and the Spanish frigate Navarra took part in Operation Enduring Freedom. Acting on US intelligence, the Spanish ships intercepted the merchant ship So San on 9 December and boarded it after the captain refused requests to stop. Spanish marines boarded the vessel 960 km (518 nmi) east of the Horn of Africa and discovered 15 Scud missiles and dual-use chemicals hidden beneath sacks of cement. So San had departed North Korea with the weapons bound for Yemen. After Yemeni protest over the seizure of the ship, claiming that the delivery of the weapons was legal under existing law, So San was released and completed its journey.

=== Somalia, 2010 to 2015 ===
Patiño was deployed and operates as part of the European Union's Operation Atalanta security mission. The EU force NAVFOR, a multinational mission to protect ships, patrols the region in the shipping route off the coast of Somalia. Patino was the NAVFOR flagship.

On 8 December 2010, Patiño arrived off Somalia and became the flagship of the operation under Rear Admiral Juan Rodriguez on 14 December. Her role as the flagship lasted until 21 January 2011. By the end of November 2011 the vessel returned to the Indian Ocean to take her second tour at Operation Atalanta. As a replenishment ship she supported other vessels of the operation with oil and other supplies and also escorted ships with humanitarian help to Somalia.

==== Pirate attack ====
In the early morning of 12 January 2012, Patiño was attacked by Somali pirates, apparently under the assumption that the ship was just a commercial vessel. The Spanish naval vessel fought off an attack by the pirates. Patiño then sent one of her helicopters to chase the attackers and captured six of them while one was reported killed. Patiño had been escorting a ship carrying food aid to Somalia for the World Food Programme.

=== Canada, 2016 ===
In 2015 the Canadian and Spanish governments concluded a deal where Patiño and Cantabria would deploy with Canadian naval forces in the Atlantic as their replenishment vessel in 2016. This would be done primarily for training missions. Patiño would be made available to the Royal Canadian Navy from January to March 2016. The ship deployed with the Royal Canadian Navy beginning on 12 February 2016 for two months. The ship returned to Spain on 30 March 2016. Beginning 1 September, Patiño deployed with the Royal Canadian Navy for 79 days, returning to Ferrol on 18 November.

== Sources ==
- Forster, Peter Kent & Cimbala, Stephen J. (2005). The US, NATO and Military Burden-Sharing. New York City: Frank Cass. ISBN 0-203-00250-4.
- Guilfoyle, Douglas (2009). Shipping Interdiction and the Law of the Sea. Cambridge, United Kingdom: University of Cambridge Press. ISBN 978-0-521-76019-5.
- Saunders, Stephen, ed. (2009). Jane's Fighting Ships 2009–2010 (112 ed.). Alexandria, Virginia: Jane's Information Group Inc. ISBN 978-0-7106-2888-6.
