= Spanish frigate Asturias =

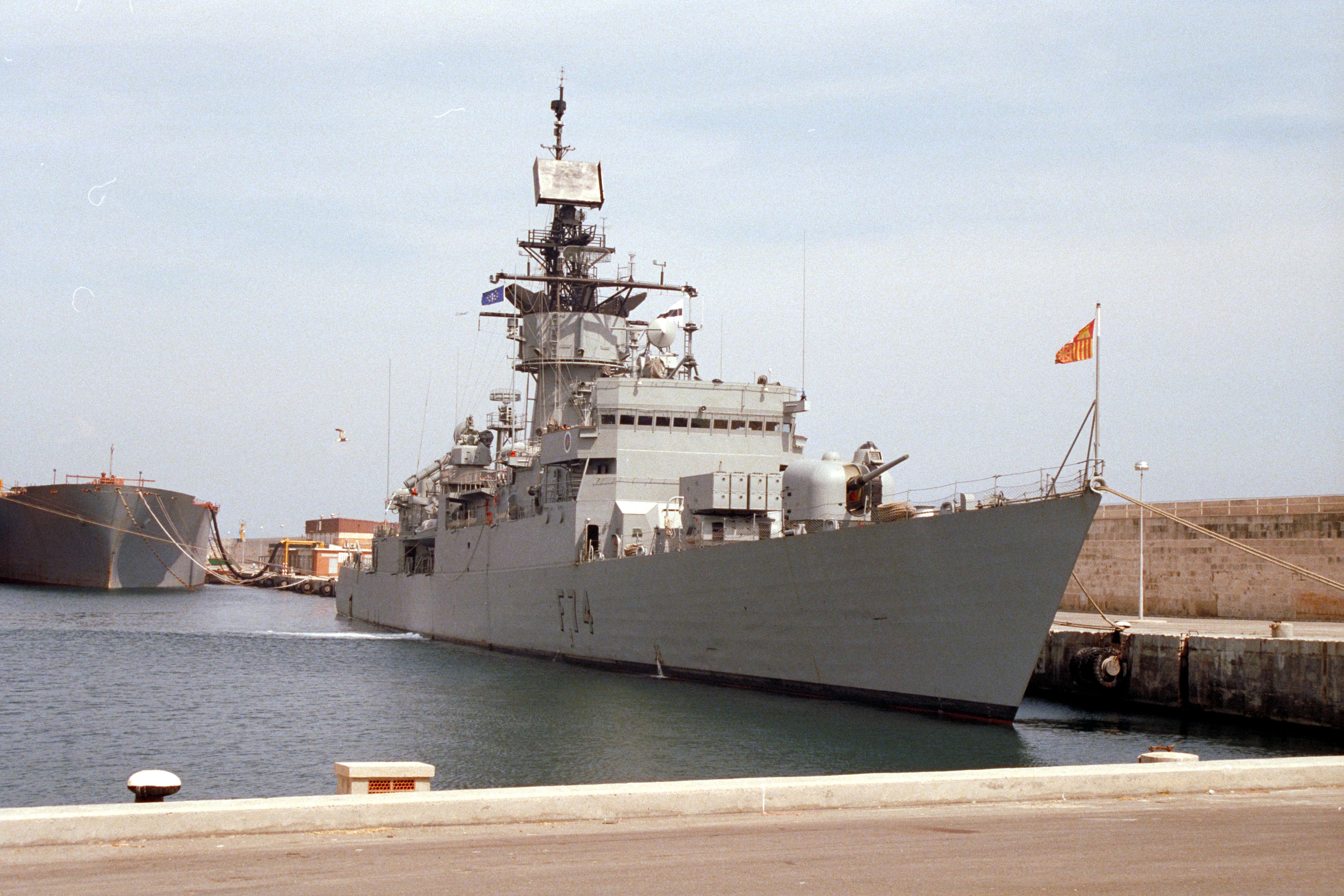
- Asturias (F74)

History

Spain
- Name: Asturias
- Namesake: Asturias
- Builder: Bazan
- Laid down: 30 March 1971
- Launched: 13 March 1972
- Commissioned: 2 December 1975
- Decommissioned: 30 June 2009
- Identification: F74

General characteristics
- Class & type: Baleares-class frigate
- Displacement: 3,015 long tons (3,063 t), standard 4,177 long tons (4,244 t), full load
- Length: 438 ft (134 m), overall
- Beam: 46 ft 9 in (14.25 m)
- Draft: 24 ft 9 in (7.54 m)
- Propulsion: 1 shaft, one Westinghouse steam turbine, 2 V2M boilers. total 35,000 shp (maximum),
- Speed: 28 knots (52 km/h)
- Sensors & processing systems: AN/SPS-52B Air Search Radar; RAN-12L/X Air Search Radar; AN/SPS-10F Surface Search Radar; DE1160LF Sonar; AN/SQS-35(v)Variable Depth Sonar system; AN/SPG-53 Mk68 Gun Fire Control System
- Electronic warfare & decoys: Ceselsa Deneb/Canopus, Mk36 SROC decoy launchers
- Armament: 1 × Mk-16 8 cell missile launcher for RUR-5 ASROC and Harpoon missiles; 1 × Mk42 5-inch/54 caliber gun; 2 × quad Mk141 launchers for Harpoon missiles; 1 × Standard SAM launcher (16 Missiles); 2 × 20mm Meroka CIWS gun systems; Mark 46 torpedoes (from 4 × single tube launchers)

Asturias (F74) is the fourth ship of five Spanish-built Baleares-class frigates, based on the American Knox class design, of the Spanish Navy.

Laid down on 30 March 1971 and launched on 13 March 1972, Asturias was commissioned into service on 2 December 1975.

== Bibliography ==
- Sturton, Ian (1995). "Spain". In Chumbley, Stephen (ed.). Conway's All The World's Fighting Ships 1947–1995. Annapolis, Maryland: Naval Institute Press. pp. 427–441. ISBN 1-55750-132-7.
