= Spanish frigate Baleares =

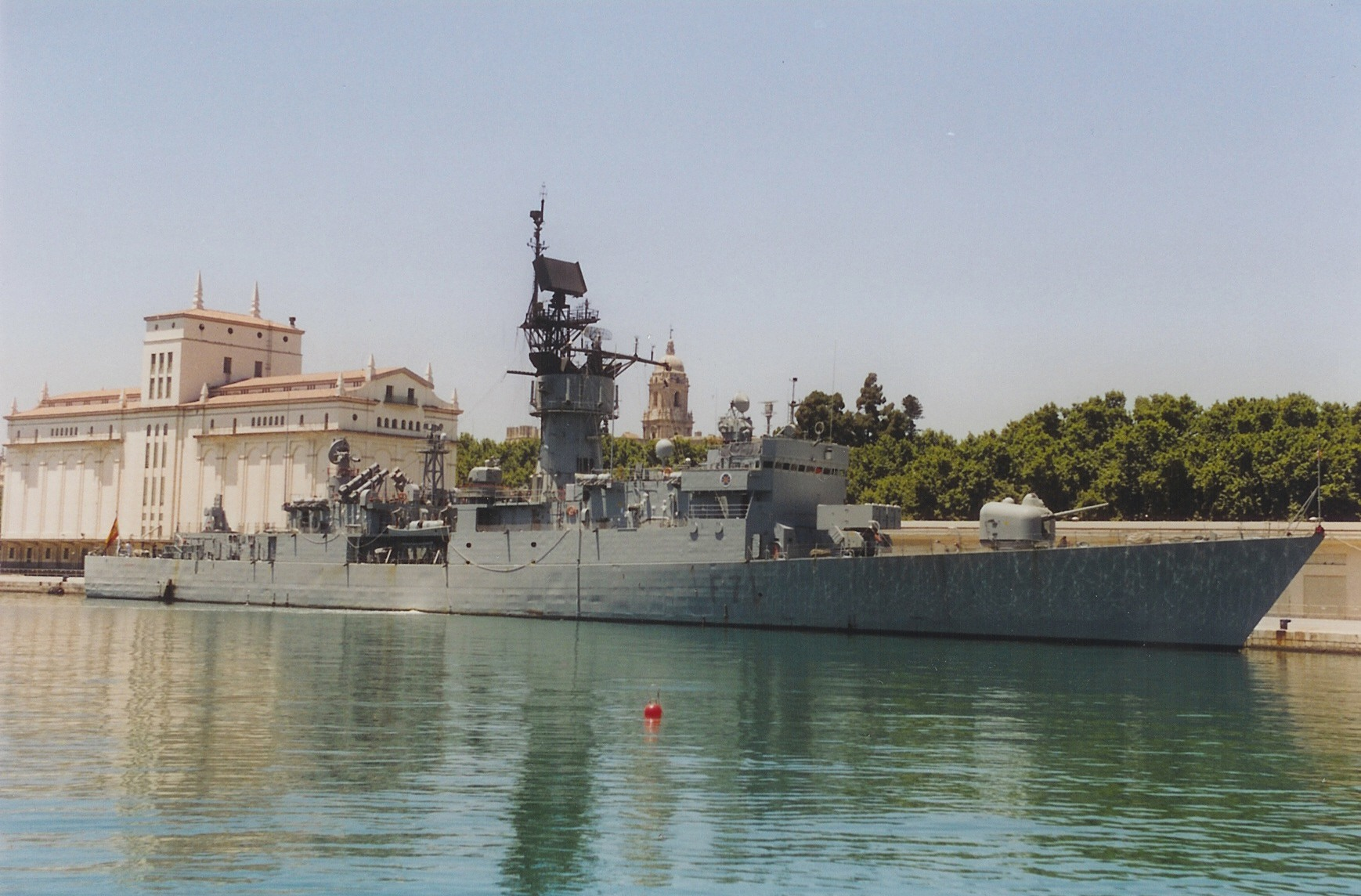
- Baleares on 29 December 2009

History

Spain
- Name: Baleares
- Namesake: Balearic Islands
- Builder: Bazan
- Laid down: 31 October 1968
- Launched: 20 August 1970
- Commissioned: 24 September 1973
- Decommissioned: 2004
- Identification: F71

General characteristics
- Class & type: Baleares-class frigate
- Displacement: 3,015 long tons (3,063 t), standard 4,177 long tons (4,244 t), full load
- Length: 438 ft (134 m), overall
- Beam: 46 ft 9 in (14.25 m)
- Draft: 24 ft 9 in (7.54 m)
- Propulsion: 1 shaft, one Westinghouse steam turbine, 2 V2M boilers. total 35,000 shp (maximum),
- Speed: 28 knots (52 km/h)
- Sensors & processing systems: AN/SPS-52B Air Search Radar; RAN-12L/X Air Search Radar; AN/SPS-10F Surface Search Radar; DE1160LF Sonar; AN/SQS-35(v)Variable Depth Sonar system; AN/SPG-53 Mk68 Gun Fire Control System
- Electronic warfare & decoys: Ceselsa Deneb/Canopus, Mk36 SROC decoy launchers
- Armament: 1 × Mk-16 8 cell missile launcher for RUR-5 ASROC and Harpoon missiles; 1 × Mk42 5-inch/54 caliber gun; 2 × quad Mk141 launchers for Harpoon missiles; 1 × Standard SAM launcher (16 Missiles); 2 × 20mm Meroka CIWS gun systems; Mark 46 torpedoes (from 4 × single tube launchers)

Baleares (F71) is the lead ship of five Spanish-built Baleares-class frigates, based on the American Knox class design, of the Spanish Navy.

Laid down on 31 October 1968 and launched on 20 August 1970, Baleares was commissioned into service on 24 September 1973.Sturton, p. 435

== Bibliography ==
- Sturton, Ian (1995). "Spain". In Chumbley, Stephen (ed.). Conway's All The World's Fighting Ships 1947–1995. Annapolis, Maryland: Naval Institute Press. pp. 427–441. ISBN 1-55750-132-7.
