= Extremadura (disambiguation) =

Extremadura is an autonomous community in western Spain.

Extremadura may also refer to:

- Extremadura UD, a Spanish football team
- Extremadura Femenino CF, also known as CF Puebla Extremadura, a Spanish women's football club
- CF Extremadura, a Spanish football team, founded in 1924 but folded in 2010
- Extremadura (Vino de la Tierra), a Spanish geographical indication for Vino de la Tierra wines from Extremadura
- Spanish ship Extremadura, more than one Spanish Navy ship

== See also ==
- Estremadura (disambiguation)
