= F71 =

F71 may refer to:

- HMS Scylla (F71), a 1968 British Royal Navy Leander-class frigate
- SPS Baleares (F71), a 1970 Spanish Navy Baleares-class frigate
- Moderate mental retardation, by ICD-10 code
