= Spanish ship Extremadura =

Various Spanish Navy ships

Two ships of the Spanish Navy have borne the name Extremadura, after Extremadura, a region of Spain:

- Spanish cruiser Extremadura, a protected cruiser commissioned in 1902, decommissioned in 1931, and scrapped in 1932.
- Spanish frigate Extremadura (F75), an Baleares-class frigate commissioned in 1976 and decommissioned in 2006.
