= USS Ramsey =

Brooke-class destroyer, later a frigate, in the United States Navy

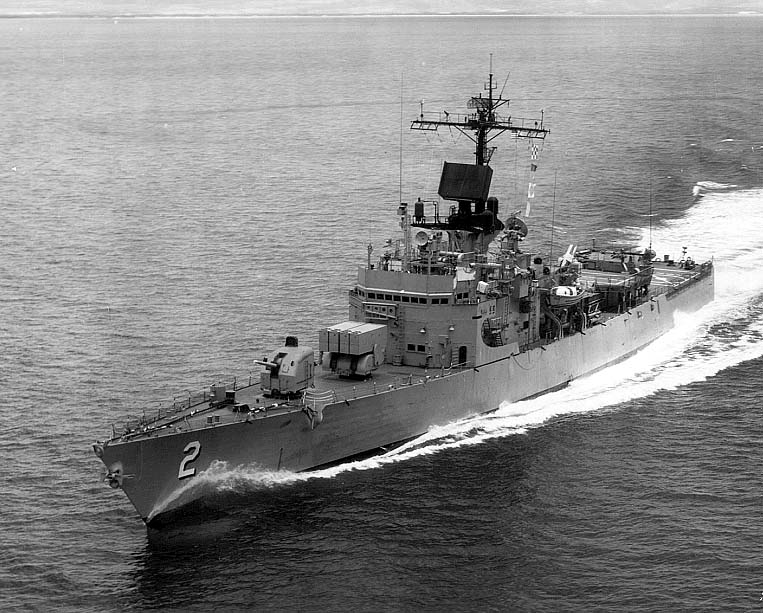
- USS Ramsey (DEG-2 / FFG-2)

History

United States
- Namesake: DeWitt Clinton Ramsey
- Ordered: 4 January 1962
- Builder: Lockheed Shipbuilding and Construction Company, Seattle, Washington
- Laid down: 4 February 1963
- Launched: 15 October 1963
- Acquired: 26 May 1967
- Commissioned: 3 June 1967
- Decommissioned: 1 September 1988
- Stricken: 25 January 1992
- Fate: Sunk as a target, 15 June 2000

General characteristics
- Class & type: Brooke-class frigate
- Displacement: 3,426 tons full
- Length: 414 ft 6 in (126.34 m)
- Beam: 44 ft 2 in (13.46 m)
- Draft: 24 ft (7.3 m)
- Propulsion: 2 Foster-Wheeler boilers; 1 Westinghouse geared turbine
- Speed: 27 knots
- Range: 4,000 nautical miles
- Complement: 241
- Sensors & processing systems: AN/SPS-52 3D air search radar; AN/SPS-10 surface search radar; AN/SPG-51 missile fire control radar; AN/SQS-26 bow mounted sonar
- Electronic warfare & decoys: AN/SLQ-32; AN/SLQ-25 Nixie
- Armament: 1 × 5"/38 caliber gun; 1 × Mk 22 RIM-24 Tartar/RIM-66 Standard missile launcher (16 missiles); 1 × 8 cell ASROC launcher; 2 × 3 12.75 in (324mm) Mk 32 torpedo tubes, Mk 46 torpedoes; 2 × MK 37 torpedo tubes (fixed, stern, removed later)
- Aircraft carried: SH-2 Seasprite

USS Ramsey (DEG-2/FFG-2) was a Brooke-class destroyer, later a frigate, in the United States Navy. She was named for Admiral DeWitt Clinton Ramsey.

Ramsey was laid down 4 February 1963 by Lockheed Shipbuilding & Construction Company, Seattle, Washington; launched 15 October 1963; sponsored by Mrs. DeWitt Clinton Ramsey; and commissioned 3 June 1967. She had an overall length of 415 feet and displaced 3446 tons.

After shakedown off the west coast, Ramsey departed Long Beach, California, on 1 May 1968 for the western Pacific. Following duty off Vietnam and her return to Long Beach 9 November, she sailed again for the western Pacific 8 October 1969, and again operated off Vietnam, before returning to Long Beach 18 April 1970. Between January 1970 and January 1974, Ramsey alternated two more WestPac cruises with operations off the west coast of the United States.

Ramsey earned five battle stars for Vietnam service. She was classified as a Destroyer, Guided Missile Escort (DEG-2) from her commissioning until after her combat tours in Vietnam. The new designation was Guided Missile (Fighting) Frigate, (FFG-2), effective 30 June 1975. She was decommissioned on 1 September 1988.

She was expended as a target 15 June 2000 in 2700 fathoms (16,200 ft) north of Hawaii at 23 53 N -- 159 35 W.

As of 2012, no other ship in the United States Navy has been named Ramsey.
