= Spanish frigate Andalucia =

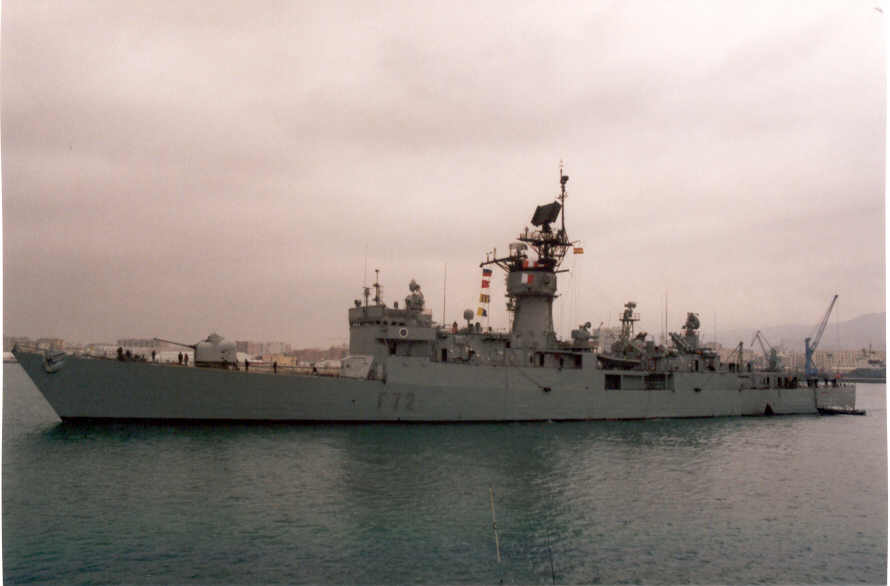
- Andalucia

History

Spain
- Name: Andalucia
- Namesake: Andalusia
- Builder: Bazan
- Laid down: July 1969
- Launched: 30 March 1971
- Commissioned: 23 May 1974
- Decommissioned: 2005
- Identification: F72

General characteristics
- Class & type: Baleares-class frigate
- Displacement: 3,015 long tons (3,063 t), standard 4,177 long tons (4,244 t), full load
- Length: 438 ft (134 m), overall
- Beam: 46 ft 9 in (14.25 m)
- Draft: 24 ft 9 in (7.54 m)
- Propulsion: 1 shaft, one Westinghouse steam turbine, 2 V2M boilers. total 35,000 shp (maximum),
- Speed: 28 knots (52 km/h)
- Sensors & processing systems: AN/SPS-52B Air Search Radar; RAN-12L/X Air Search Radar; AN/SPS-10F Surface Search Radar; DE1160LF Sonar; AN/SQS-35(v)Variable Depth Sonar system; AN/SPG-53 Mk68 Gun Fire Control System
- Electronic warfare & decoys: Ceselsa Deneb/Canopus, Mk36 SROC decoy launchers
- Armament: 1 × Mk-16 8 cell missile launcher for RUR-5 ASROC and Harpoon missiles; 1 × Mk42 5-inch/54 caliber gun; 2 × quad Mk141 launchers for Harpoon missiles; 1 × Standard SAM launcher (16 Missiles); 2 × 20mm Meroka CIWS gun systems; Mark 46 torpedoes (from 4 × single tube launchers)

Andalucia (F72) is the second ship of five Spanish-built Baleares-class frigates, based on the American Knox class design, of the Spanish Navy.

Laid down on 2 July 1969 and launched on 30 March 1971, Andalucia was commissioned into service on 23 May 1974.

== Bibliography ==
- Sturton, Ian (1995). "Spain". In Chumbley, Stephen (ed.). Conway's All The World's Fighting Ships 1947–1995. Annapolis, Maryland: Naval Institute Press. pp. 427–441. ISBN 1-55750-132-7.
