= F72 =

F72 or F-72 may refer to:

== Ships ==
- HMS Ariadne (F72), a Leander-class frigate of the Royal Navy
- HMS Jersey (F72), a J-class destroyer of the Royal Navy
- Kang Won (F-72), a Cannon-class destroyer escort of the Republic of Korea Navy
- Spanish frigate Andalucia, a Baleares-class frigate of the Spanish Navy

== Other uses ==
- Birrana F72, a race car
- Franklin Field (California), in Sacramento County, California
- Severe intellectual disabilities
