= Estremadura =

Estremadura may refer to:

- Estremadura Province (historical), Portugal
- Estremadura Province (1936–1976), Portugal
- Lisboa VR, a Portuguese wine region called Estremadura until 2009

== See also ==
- Extremadura, an autonomous community of western Spain
- Extremadura (disambiguation)
- Extremaduran (disambiguation)
