= Extremaduran =

Extremaduran may refer to:

- Something related to Extremadura, an autonomous community in western Spain, including:

- The Extremaduran language, a language spoken in Northwestern areas of Extremadura
- The Extremaduran dialect of Spanish, spoken in most of Extremadura
- Extremadurans, the people of Extremadura

== See also ==
- Estremadura (disambiguation)
