= Spanish frigate Reina Sofía =

Santa María-class frigates

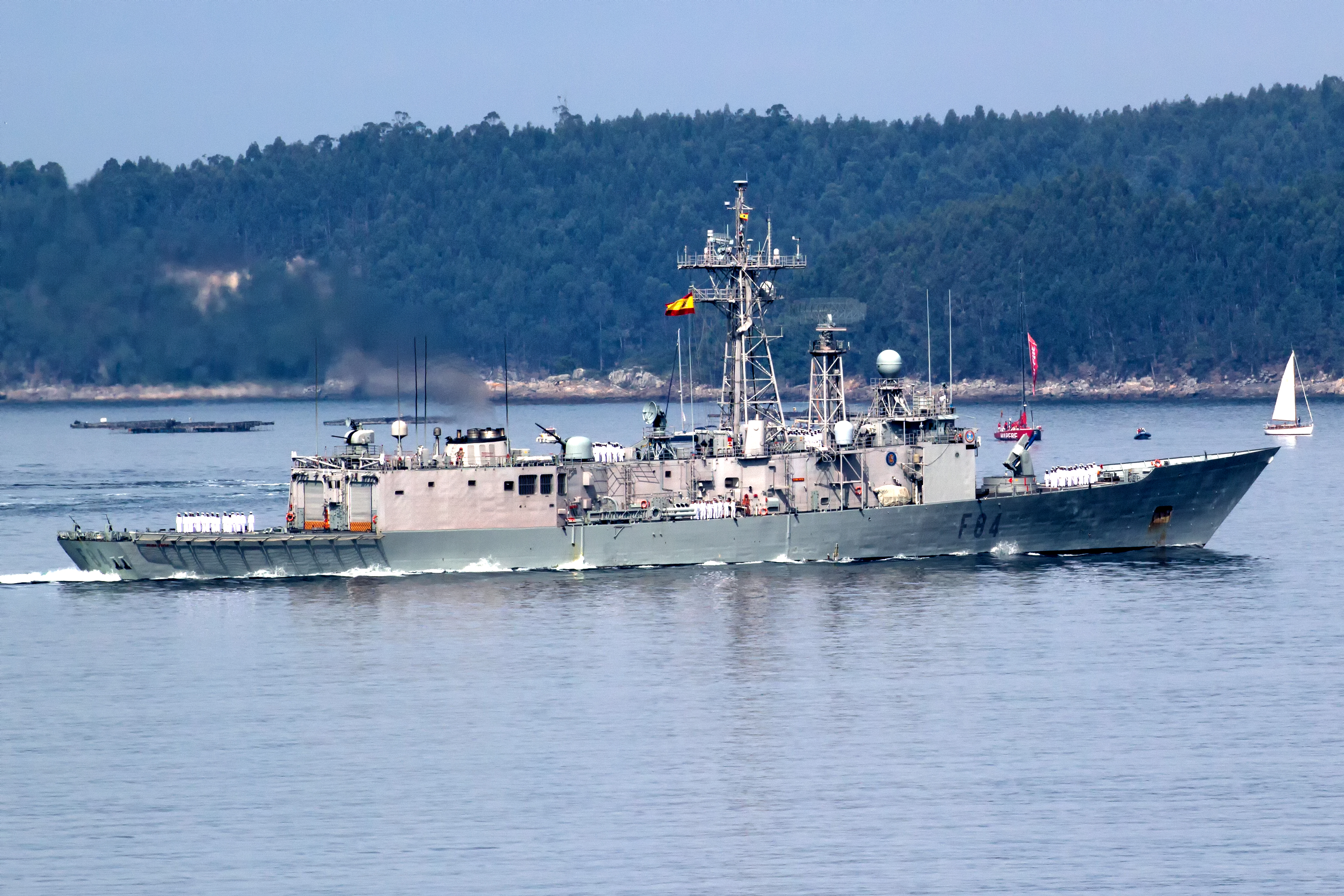
- Reina Sofía on 2 June 2017

History

Spain
- Name: Reina Sofía
- Namesake: Queen Sofía of Spain
- Builder: Bazan
- Laid down: 12 October 1987
- Launched: 19 July 1989
- Commissioned: 30 October 1990
- Home port: Rota
- Identification: MMSI number: 224986000; Callsign: EBFO; Pennant number: F84
- Status: in active service

General characteristics
- Class & type: Santa María-class frigate
- Displacement: 3,160 t (3,110 long tons) standard
- Length: 138.8 m (455 ft 5 in)
- Beam: 14.3 m (46 ft 11 in)
- Draught: 6.6 m (21 ft 8 in) max
- Propulsion: 2 × General Electric LM2500-30 gas turbines generating 41,000 shp (31 MW) through a single shaft and variable pitch propeller; 2 × Auxiliary Propulsion Units, 350 hp (260 kW) retractable electric azimuth thrusters for maneuvering and docking.
- Speed: 29 knots (54 km/h; 33 mph)
- Complement: 223
- Sensors & processing systems: Radar: AN/SPS-49(V)4 2-D air search ((V)5 in F-85 & F-86), RAN-12L (being replaced by RAN-30) 2-D low horizon air search radar for Meroka, SPS-55 surface search radar, Mk 92 fire control system, Sonar: SQS-56, SQR-19(V) Towed Array (-19(V)2 in F-85 & F-86), Fire control: Mk 13 weapons control, Mk 92 and SPG-60 STIR missile control, SQQ-89 ASW
- Electronic warfare & decoys: Nettunel (F-85 & F-86: Mk-3000) intercept, SLQ-25 Nixie, Mk36 SROC decoy launchers
- Armament: 1 × single-arm Mk 13 Missile Launcher with a 40-round magazine that can handle 32 SM-1MR anti-air/ship missiles and 8 Harpoon anti-ship missiles; 2 × triple Mark 32 ASW torpedo tubes with Mark 46 Mod 5 anti-submarine torpedoes; 1 × OTO Melara 76 mm/62 cal. naval gun; 1 × 20 mm Meroka 12-barrel CIWS system
- Aircraft carried: 2 × Sikorsky SH-60B Seahawk LAMPS III helicopters

Reina Sofía (F84) is the fourth of six Spanish-built Santa María-class frigates of the Spanish Navy. The Santa María class is based on the American Oliver Hazard Perry-class design, providing an anti-air warfare platform with anti-submarine and anti-surface warfare capabilities at a reduced cost. Reina Sofía was constructed by Bazan and was laid down on 12 October 1987 and launched on 19 July 1989. The ship was commissioned in 1990 and has seen service in the Mediterranean Sea and off Somalia.

== Design and description ==
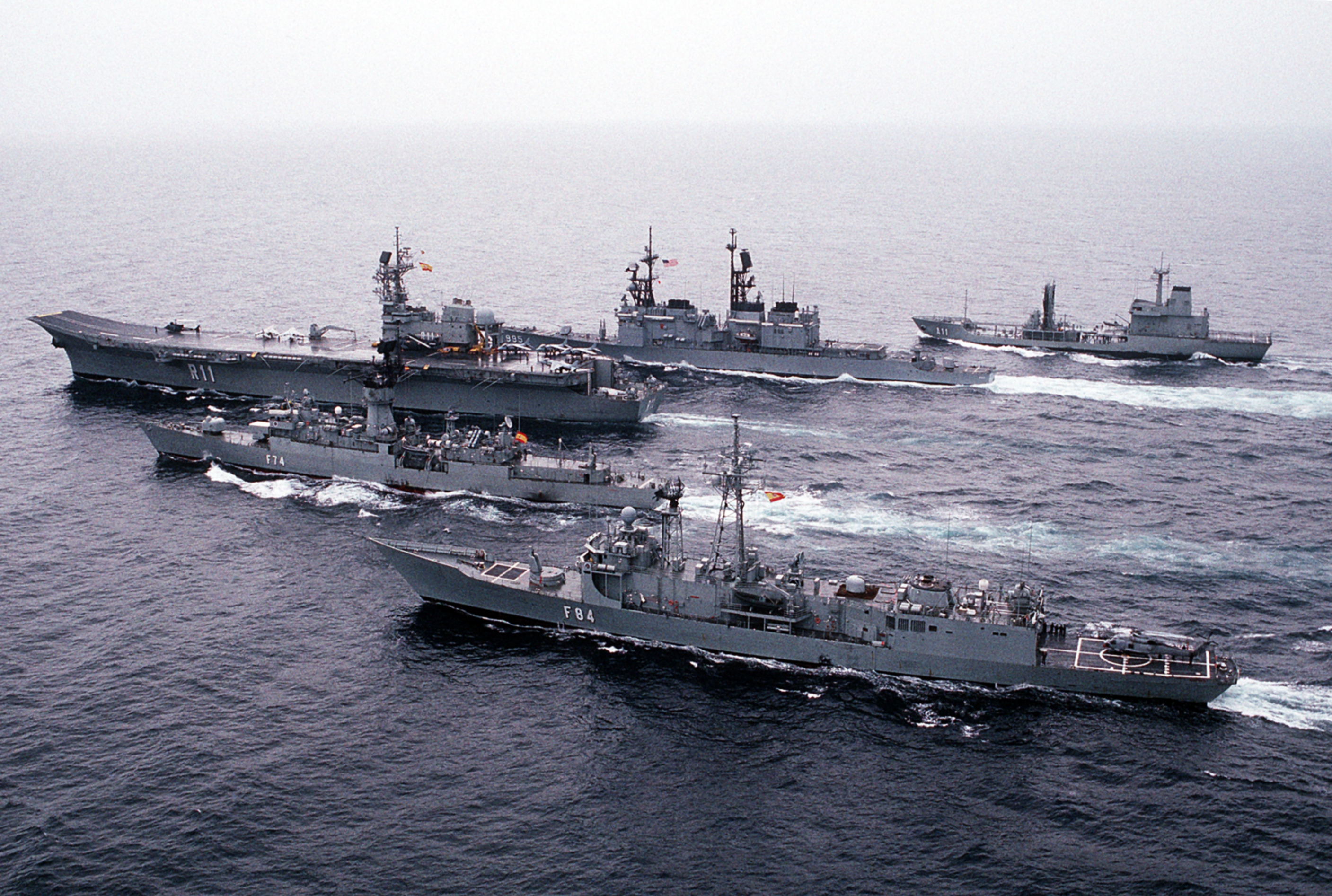
Reina Sofía on 1 February 1992

The Santa María class are a series of six guided missile frigates based on the American Oliver Hazard Perry class. The Oliver Hazard Perry class had been conceived as a way to reduce unit costs while maintaining an anti-air warfare (AAW) platform with anti-submarine (ASW) and anti-surface warfare capabilities. The Oliver Hazard Perry class came in two forms, the short-hulled and long-hulled, with the Santa María class being of the later with additional beam to allow for more top weight for future modifications. The class came in two batches, with the first four being of batch one and the final two of the second. The first batch of ships have a displacement of 2,851 tonnes (2,806 long tons) light, 3,160 t (3,110 long tons) standard and 4,017 t (3,954 long tons) at full load. The second batch have the same light and standard displacements, with a full load displacement of 4,107 t (4,042 long tons). The frigates measure 138.8 metres (455 ft 5 in) long overall and 125.9 m (413 ft 1 in) at the waterline with a beam of 14.3 m (46 ft 11 in) and a standard draught of 4.52 m (14 ft 10 in) and a maximum draught at the sonar dome of 6.6 m (21 ft 8 in). The ships have a complement of 223 sailors including 13 officers.

The Santa María class is propelled by a controllable pitch propeller powered by two General Electric LM2500 gas turbines creating 41,000 shaft horsepower (31,000 kW), giving the vessels a maximum speed of 29 knots (54 km/h; 33 mph). The frigates stow 587 t (578 long tons; 647 short tons) of fuel and have a range of 5,000 nautical miles (9,300 km; 5,800 mi) at 18 knots (33 km/h; 21 mph) or 4,500 nmi (8,300 km; 5,200 mi) at 20 knots (37 km/h; 23 mph). The ships have four 1,000 kW Kato-Allison 114-DOOL diesel generator sets creating a total of 4,000 kW. These can power two 260 kW (350 shp) retractable, rotatable auxiliary propulsion motors. The vessels have fin stabilisers fitted.

=== Armament and sensors ===
Frigates of the Santa María class are armed with a single-armed Mk 13 missile launcher serviced by a 40-round magazine that can handle 32 SM-1MR anti-air/ship missiles and 8 Harpoon anti-ship missiles. The Harpoon missiles have a range of 50 nmi (93 km; 58 mi) at Mach 0.9 carrying a 227-kilogram (500 lb) warhead. The SM-1R missiles have a range of 20.5 nmi (38.0 km; 23.6 mi) at Mach 2. The vessels also mount a single OTO Melara 76-millimetre (3.0 in)/62 calibre naval gun capable of firing 85 rounds per minute up to 8.7 nmi (16.1 km; 10.0 mi) with each shell carrying a 6 kg (13 lb) warhead. (Note: /62 refers to the length of the gun in terms of calibres. A /62 gun is 62 times long as its bore diameter.) For AAW defence, the ships mount a single Meroka 20 mm (0.79 in)/120 12-barrelled close-in weapons system (CIWS) capable of firing 3,600 rounds per minute up to 2 km (1.2 mi). For ASW, the frigates are armed with two triple-mounted Mark 32 torpedo tubes for Mod 5 Mark 46 torpedoes.

The vessels are equipped with AN/SPS-49(V)5 2-D air search radar, RAN-12L (being replaced by RAN-30) 2-D low horizon air search radar for the Meroka CIWS, SPS-55 surface search radar and a Mk 92 fire-control radar. For ASW, the ships have SQS-56 sonar, SQR-19(V)2 towed array. For weapons fire control, they have Mk 13 weapons control, Mk 92 and SPG-60 STIR missile control, SQQ-89 ASW systems. For electronic warfare they have Nettunel Mk-3000 intercept, a SLQ-25 Nixie towed torpedo decoy, and Mk36 SROC decoy launchers.

=== Aircraft ===
As long-hulled versions of the Oliver Hazard Perry class, the Santa María-class frigates have twin hangars to accommodate up to two Sikorsky SH-60B Seahawk Light Airborne Multi-Purpose System (LAMPS) III helicopters though only one is usually embarked. The helicopter deck, located aft, is equipped with the RAST helicopter deck-handling system designed to handle LAMPS helicopters.

== Construction and career ==
After delays in the program caused by the construction of the aircraft carrier Príncipe de Asturias, construction of Reina Sofía was approved in 1985 and the ship was ordered on 19 June 1986. Laid down on 12 October 1987 by Bazan at Ferrol, Spain, the frigate was launched on 19 July 1989. The vessel was intended to be named America but was renamed Reina Sofía, after Queen Sofía of Spain. The ship was commissioned on 18 October 1990.

On the 200th anniversary of the Battle of Trafalgar in 2005 Reina Sofía participated in a procession alongside the French frigate Montcalm and HMS Chatham at the site of the battle.

In 2016, the ship participated in migrant rescue operations in the Mediterranean Sea. Reina Sofía also participated in training missions in the Mediterranean with the Egyptian Navy. In May 2023 Reina Sofía was deployed off the coast of East Africa in order to evacuate civilians after an escalation in violence in Sudan. The frigate evacuated 162 civilians of different nationalities from within the European Union from Sudan to Saudi Arabia.

Between 26 May and 1 June 2025, Reina Sofia visited Mumbai Port while operating under EUNAVFOR Atalanta. The port visit was followed by a military exercise with the Indian Navy.
