= Spanish aircraft carrier Príncipe de Asturias =

Spanish aircraft carrier

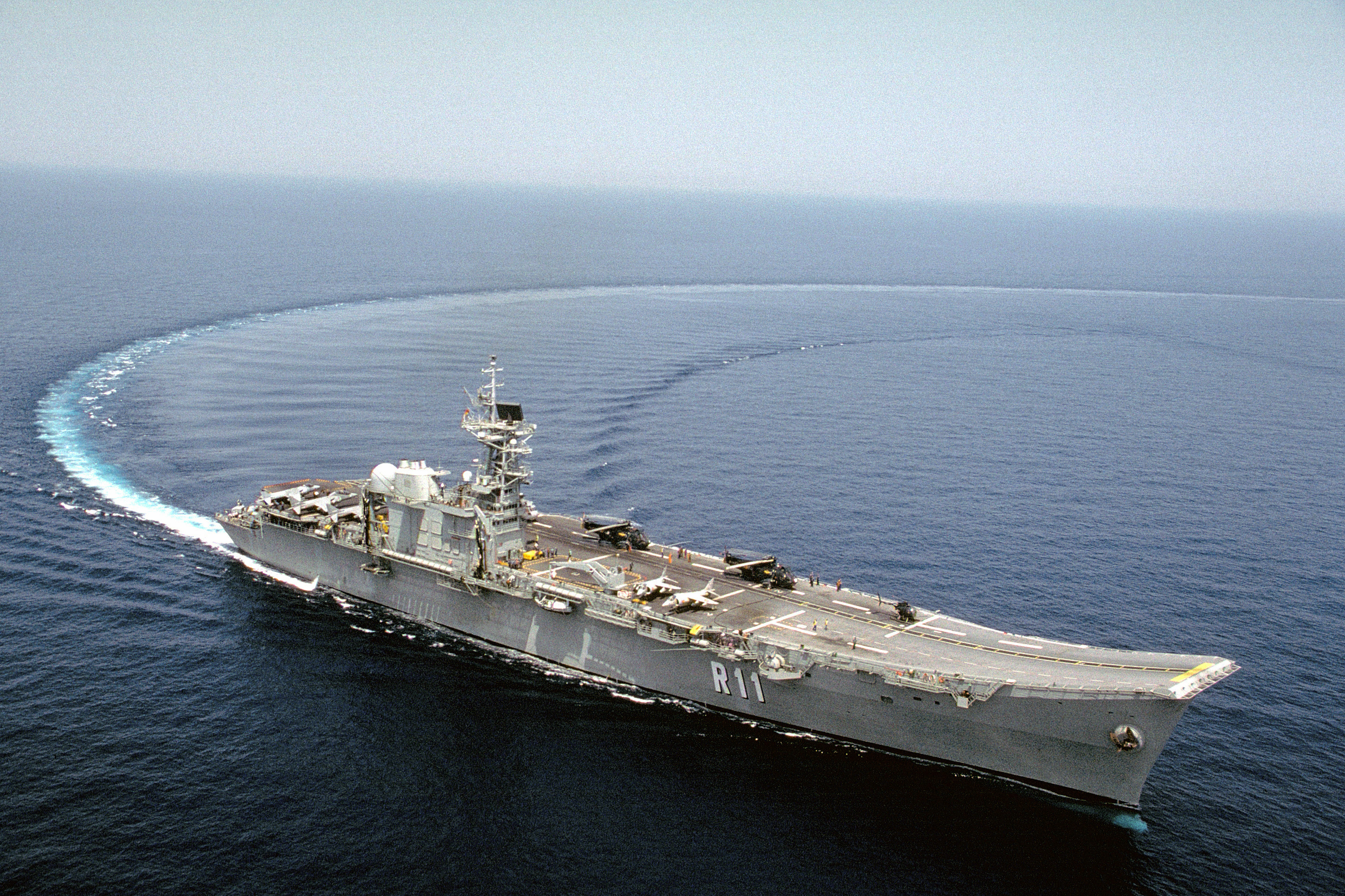
- Príncipe de Asturias during the joint exercise Dragon Hammer '92.

History

Spain
- Name: Príncipe de Asturias
- Namesake: Príncipe de Asturias
- Ordered: 29 May 1977
- Builder: Bazán, Ferrol
- Cost: US$285 million (1993)
- Laid down: 8 October 1979
- Launched: 22 May 1982
- Sponsored by: Queen Sofía of Spain
- Commissioned: 30 May 1988
- Decommissioned: 6 February 2013
- Home port: Naval Station Rota
- Identification: Pennant number: R-11
- Fate: Scrapped Aliaga 29 August 2017
- Badge: Ship's logo

General characteristics
- Class & type: Príncipe de Asturias-class light aircraft carrier
- Displacement: 15,912 tons standard, 16,700 tons loaded
- Length: 195.9 m (643 ft)
- Beam: 24.3 m (80 ft)
- Draught: 9.4 m (31 ft)
- Propulsion: 2 × Bazan-General Electric LM2500+ gas turbines in COGAG configuration, one shaft, 46,400 shp
- Speed: 26 knots (48 km/h; 30 mph)
- Range: 6,500 nautical miles (12,000 km; 7,500 mi) at 20 knots (37 km/h; 23 mph)
- Complement: 830 (total); 600 ship crew, 230 air crew
- Sensors & processing systems: Raytheon SPS-52C/D 3D air search radar, SC Cardion SPS-55 surface search radar, ITT SPN-35A aircraft control radar, FABA SPG-M2B fire control radar, SELEX Sistemi Integrati RTN-11L/X missile approach warning radar, Selex RAN 12 L target designation radar
- Electronic warfare & decoys: Nettunel electronic countermeasures unit, SRBOC, Sensytech AN/SLQ-25 Nixie decoy
- Armament: 4 × FABA Meroka Mod 2B CIWS, 12 × Oerlikon L120 20 mm guns
- Aircraft carried: 29 fixed wing and rotary wing aircraft
- Aviation facilities: 12° ski jump 46.5 m (153 ft) in length

Príncipe de Asturias (R-11) was a light aircraft carrier and former flagship of the Spanish Navy. She was built in Bazán's Shipyards and delivered to the Spanish Navy on 30 May 1988.

Spain has operated aircraft carriers since the 1920s, initially with the seaplane tender Dédalo and later the multi-role light carrier Dédalo, which was formerly the US Navy's World War II light carrier USS Cabot. Dédalo was replaced as the navy's fleet flagship by Príncipe de Asturias.

The ship was permanently assigned to the Alpha Group, comprising the carrier and six Santa Maria-class frigates (a Spanish version of the USN Oliver Hazard Perry class). Other vessels such as logistic ships, tankers and corvettes were frequently assigned to the Group when required. Príncipe de Asturias and the Alpha Group frequently participated in peace support operations in the Adriatic Sea.

The ship was retired due to defence cuts, being officially decommissioned on 6 February 2013.

Several countries had reportedly expressed interest in buying Príncipe de Asturias before she was dismantled. Indonesia reportedly showed interest, but then decided not to buy. Unconfirmed sources also indicate the Philippines, several Arab countries, and Angola had expressed interest in purchasing the Principe de Asturias. In September 2017 it was announced that the Príncipe de Asturias was bought by a Turkish company planning to scrap the vessel.

== Design ==
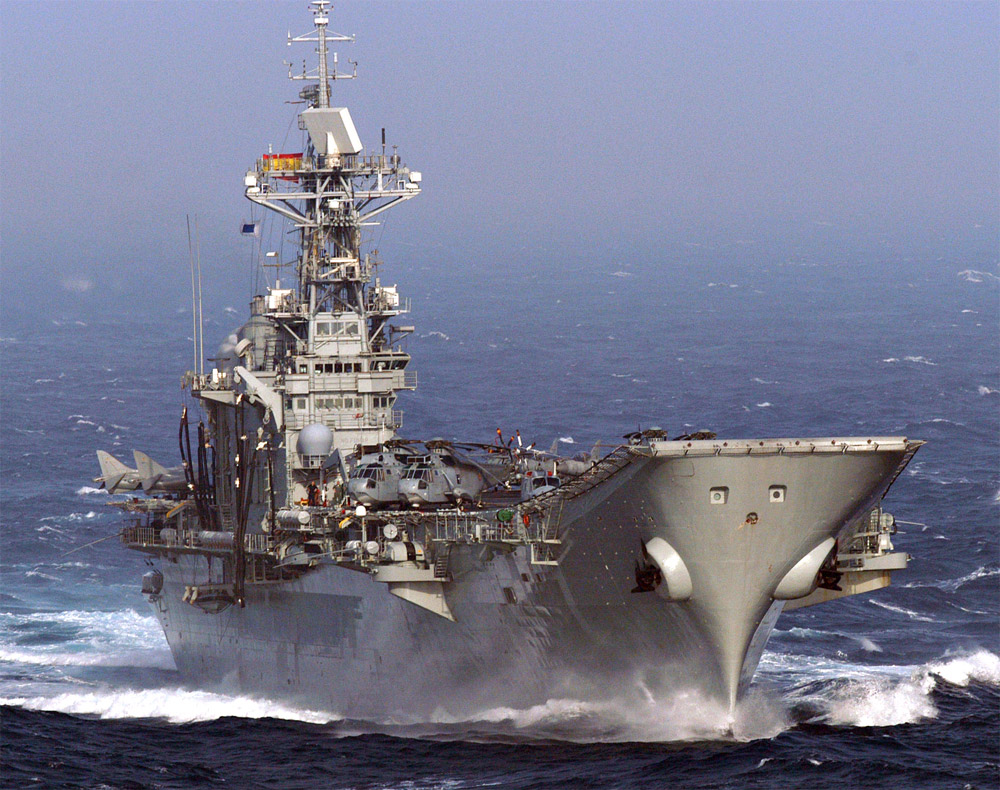
Príncipe de Asturias (R-11) sailing in 2004

The design of Principe de Asturias was based on that of the US Navy's 1970s Sea Control Ship concept. This was a proposal for a small through deck vessel, capable of operating helicopters and a small number of STOVL fixed-wing aircraft, to provide anti-submarine defence for convoys in the event of war with the Soviet Union. While the concept never got off the drawing board for the United States, Spain took an interest in it in the early 1980s when seeking a replacement for its veteran carrier, Dédalo. The design underwent a number of modifications, most prominently being fitted with a ski-jump ramp, allowing its fixed-wing aircraft to launch with improved loads, as well as other modifications to fit Spanish specifications. Constructed by the National Company Bazan (then Empresa Nacional Bazán, now Navantia) in their shipyard at Ferrol, Príncipe de Asturias was delivered to the Navy on 30 May 1988. The construction process had begun eleven years previously, on 29 May 1977. The processing of the steel began on 1 March 1978 and the keel was laid on 8 October 1979. On 22 May 1982, in a ceremony presided over by Juan Carlos I of Spain, the launch took place, with Queen Sofía of Spain as the ship's sponsor. The ship made her first sea trials in November 1987.

The Thai warship HTMS Chakri Naruebet, delivered in 1997, is based on the Spanish ship's design.

== Armament ==
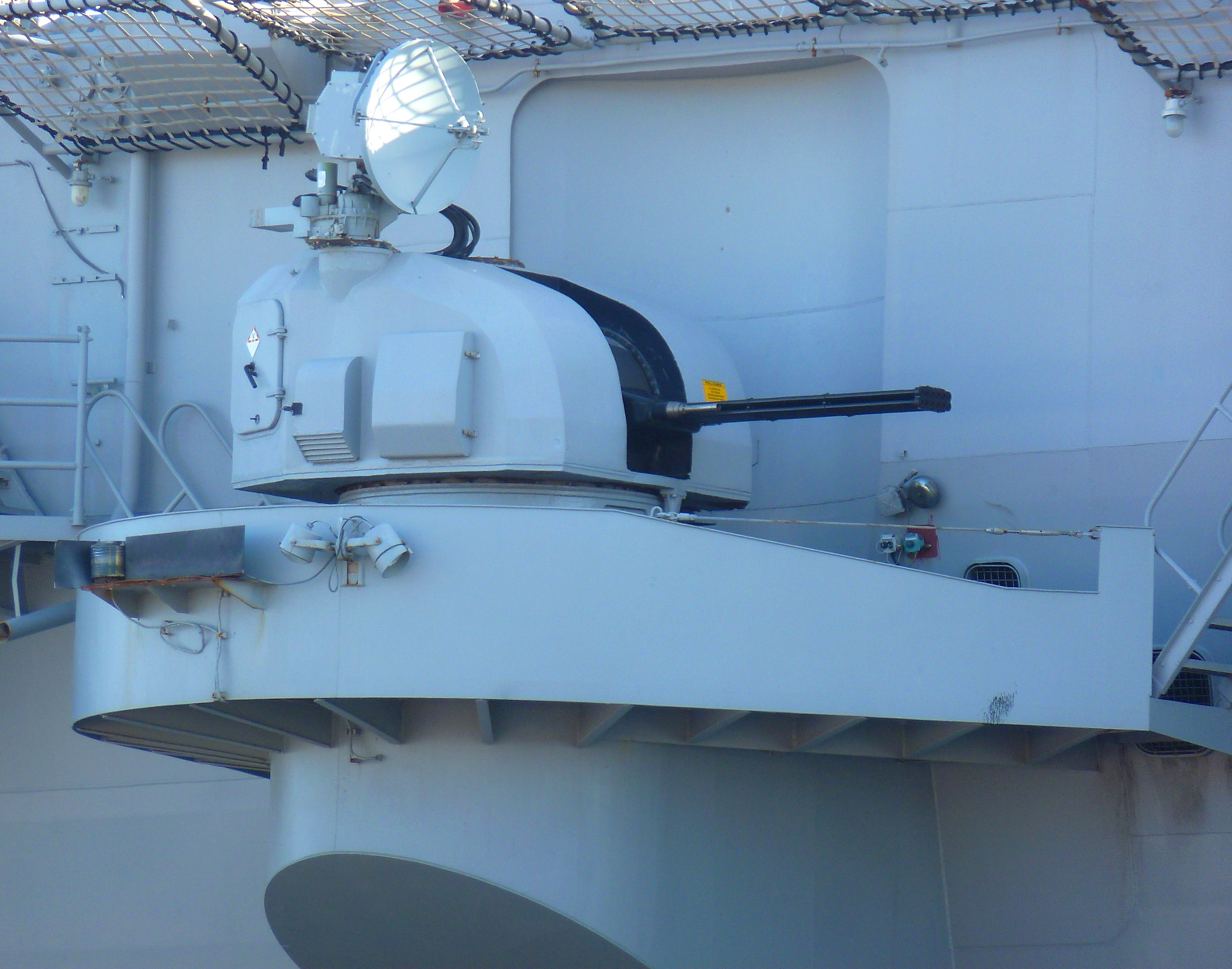
Meroka CIWS on Principe de Asturias

The self-defense armament included four close defense Meroka systems and six chaff decoy launchers. For offensive weapons, the ship relied on the capabilities of her embarked aircraft. For anti-submarine defense, she relied upon the detection capacity and attacks of her ASW helicopters and accompanying frigate battle group.

== Aircraft ==
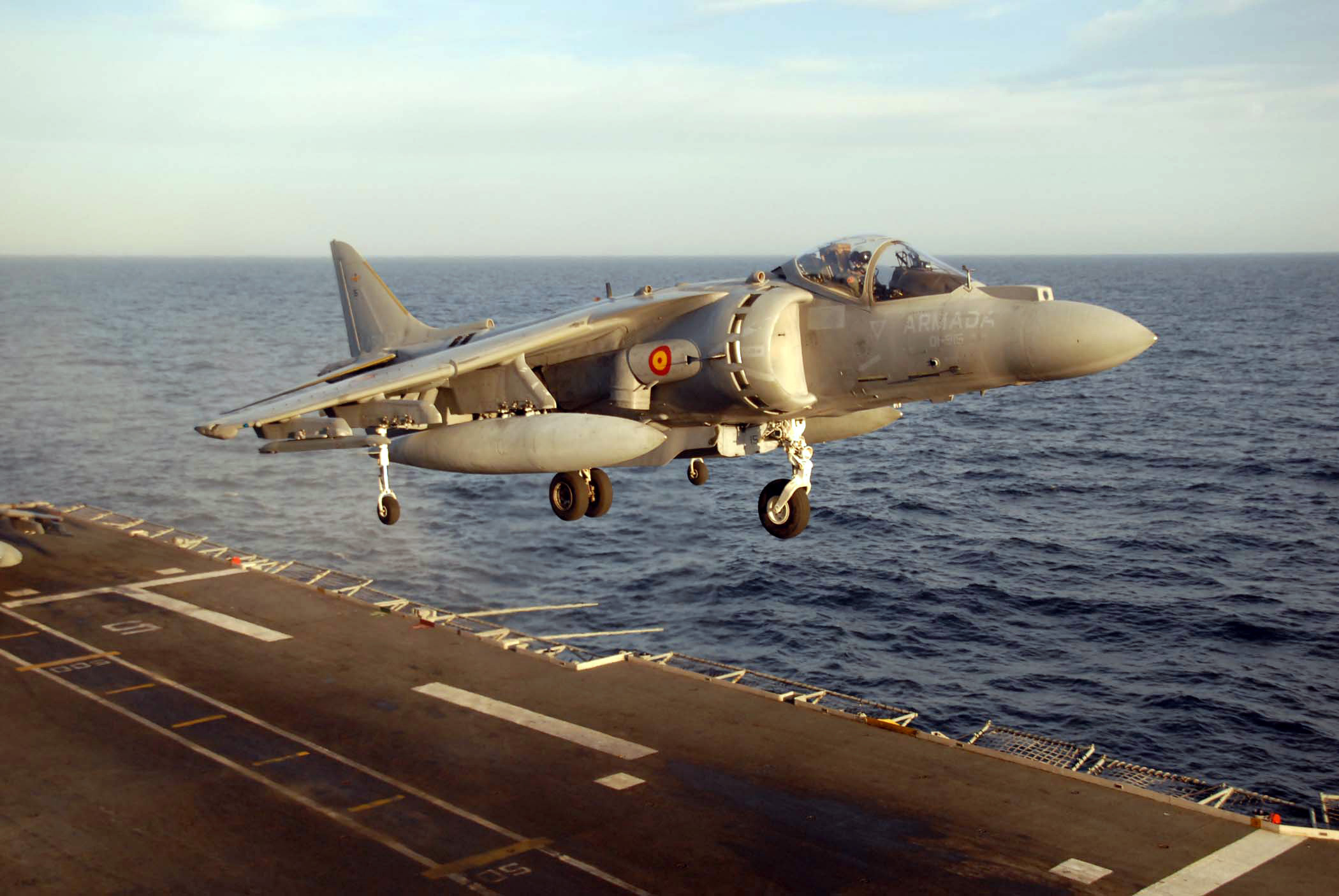
A Spanish AV-8B Harrier II operating off Príncipe de Asturias

The ship supported 12 AV-8B Harrier II Bravo or AV-8B Harrier II Plus aircraft. The carrier also had facilities to support helicopters, usually 6 Sikorsky Sea King SH-3H, 4 Agusta-Bell AB-212 and 2 Sikorsky SH-3 AEW (Airborne Early Warning) helicopters.

The ship supported a maximum of 29 fixed wing and rotary wing aircraft with up to 12 on deck and 17 aircraft in the hangar. The hangar which measures 2,398 m^{2} is accessed by two flight deck lifts. The 5,100 square metres (55,000 sq ft) flight deck was 176 metres (577 ft) in length. Operating V/STOL aircraft, the carrier had the characteristic "ski-jump" (12° here), with the runway slightly off the longitudinal axis, tilted portside.

== Withdrawal ==
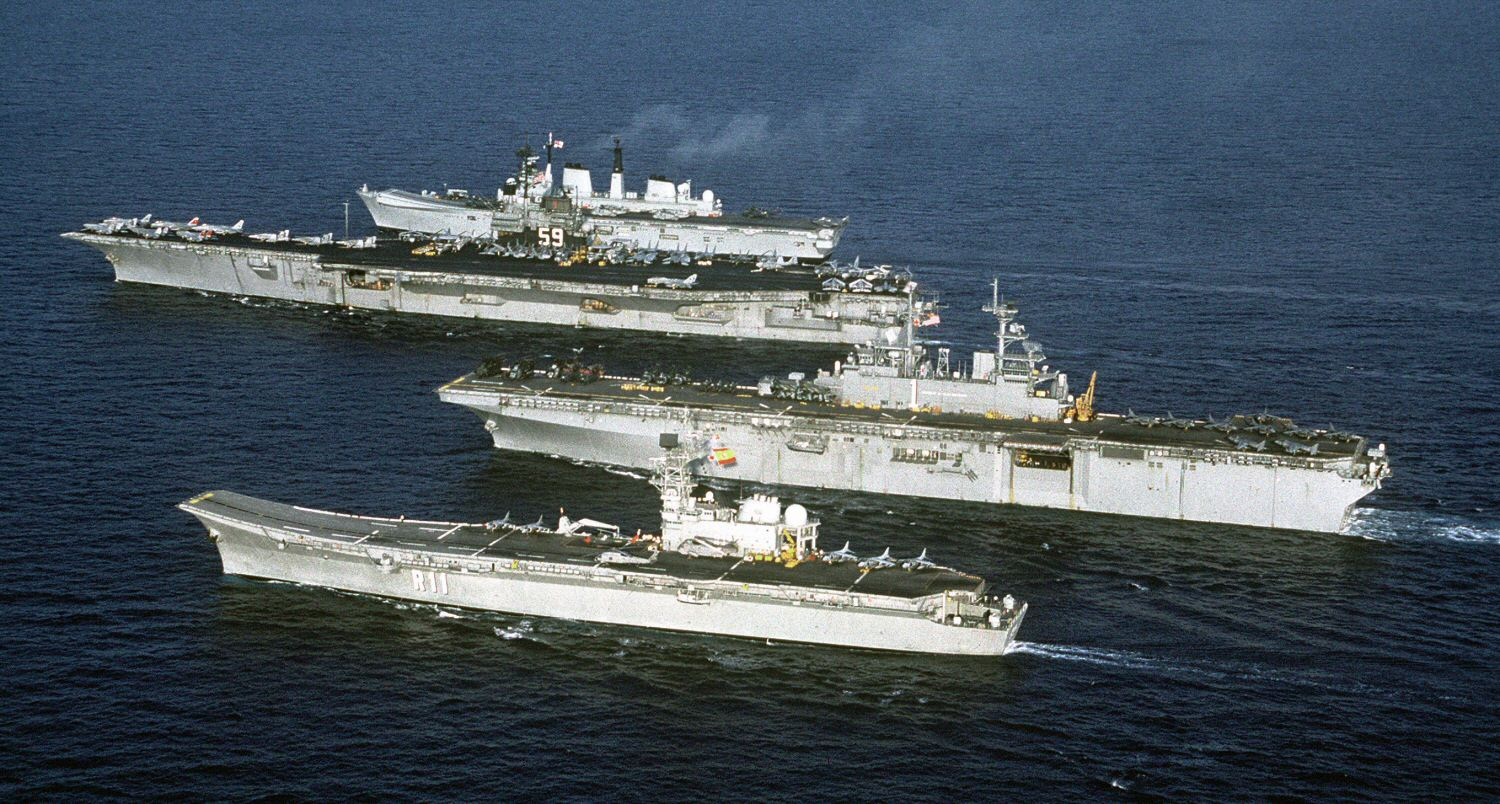
NATO Display Determination 91 exercises, from down to up: Príncipe de Asturias, USS Wasp, USS Forrestal, and HMS Invincible, sailing in 1991.

In May 2012 rumours emerged that Príncipe de Asturias could be withdrawn from active service and placed in a state of "restrictive standby" along with two of the Santa Maria-class frigates, due to the financial pressures on the Spanish government. Annual operating costs for the carrier and its air group reached €100 million. Any decision on the fate of the vessel would have to be taken at the highest possible level due to the status of the ship as the flagship of the Spanish Navy.

In November 2012, her decommissioning was confirmed. The official decommissioning ceremony was held on 6 February 2013. Aviation capability is being provided by the landing helicopter dock ship Juan Carlos I. On September 29, 2016, the decommissioning was provisionally awarded to the joint venture formed by the Spanish company Surus Inversa and its Turkish partner for €2.4 million, with plans to be scrapped at the Turkish company's facilities in Aliağa. On August 9, 2017, she departed for the Turkish port of Aliağa to be dismantled throughout 2018.

== See also ==
- List of aircraft carriers

=== Related Development ===
- HTMS Chakri Naruebet
