= AN/SPS-52 =

Cold War-era naval early warning 3D radar

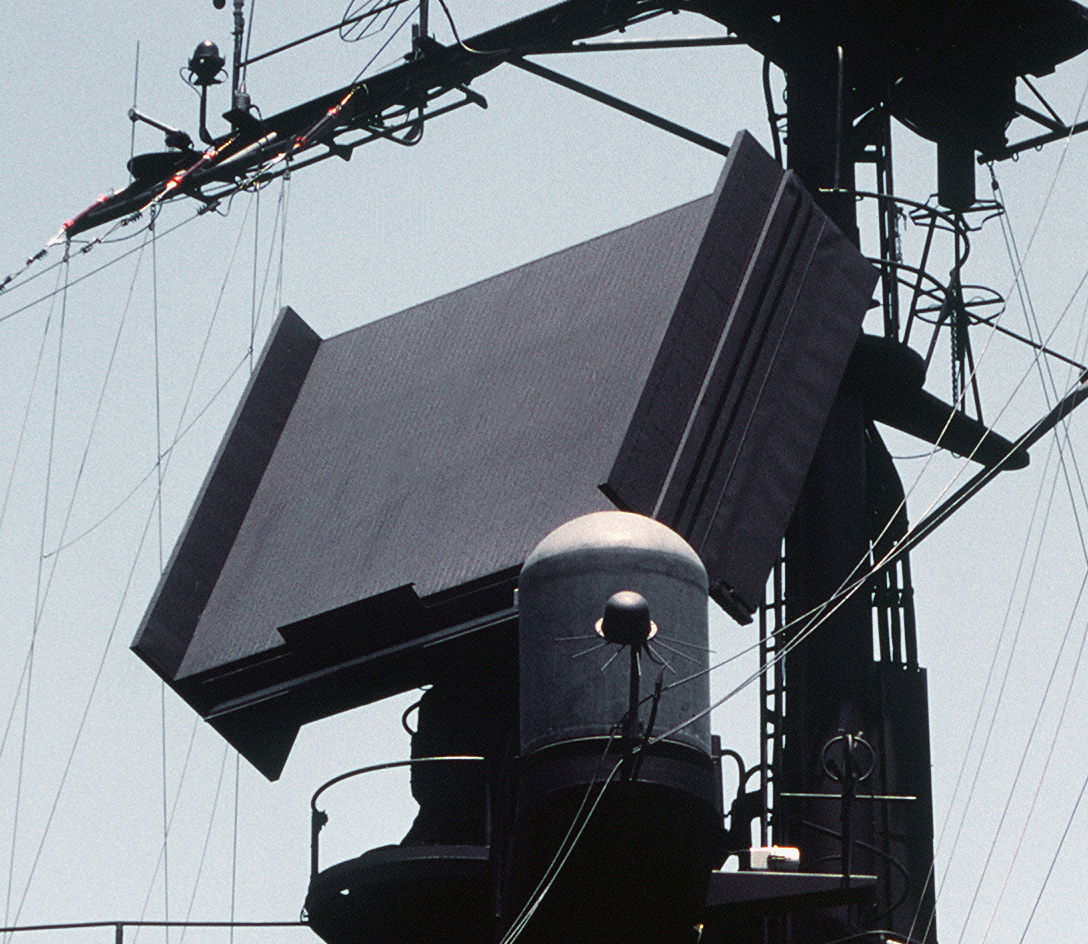
- AN/SPS-52 on USS Ramsey (FFG-2)
- Country of origin: United States
- No. built: Many
- Type: 3D Air-search
- Frequency: 2.9–3.1 GHz (10.3–9.7 cm)
- Range: 300 mi (260 nmi; 480 km)
- Azimuth: 0-360°
- Power: 1 MW
- Related: AN/SPS-39

The AN/SPS-52 is a United States Navy long-range air search 3D radar that is capable of providing contact bearing, range and altitude. It was used on Baleares and Brooke-class frigates, Charles F. Adams and Hatakaze-class destroyers, Tarawa and Wasp-class amphibious assault ships, Galveston, and Providence-class cruisers and other ships. It was replaced by the AN/SPS-48 on newer ships and ships that received upgrades. The antenna is mechanically rotated for azimuth but electronically scanned for elevation.

In accordance with the Joint Electronics Type Designation System (JETDS), the "AN/SPS-52" designation represents the 52nd design of an Army-Navy electronic device for surface ship search radar system. The JETDS system also now is used to name all Department of Defense electronic systems.

== Description ==
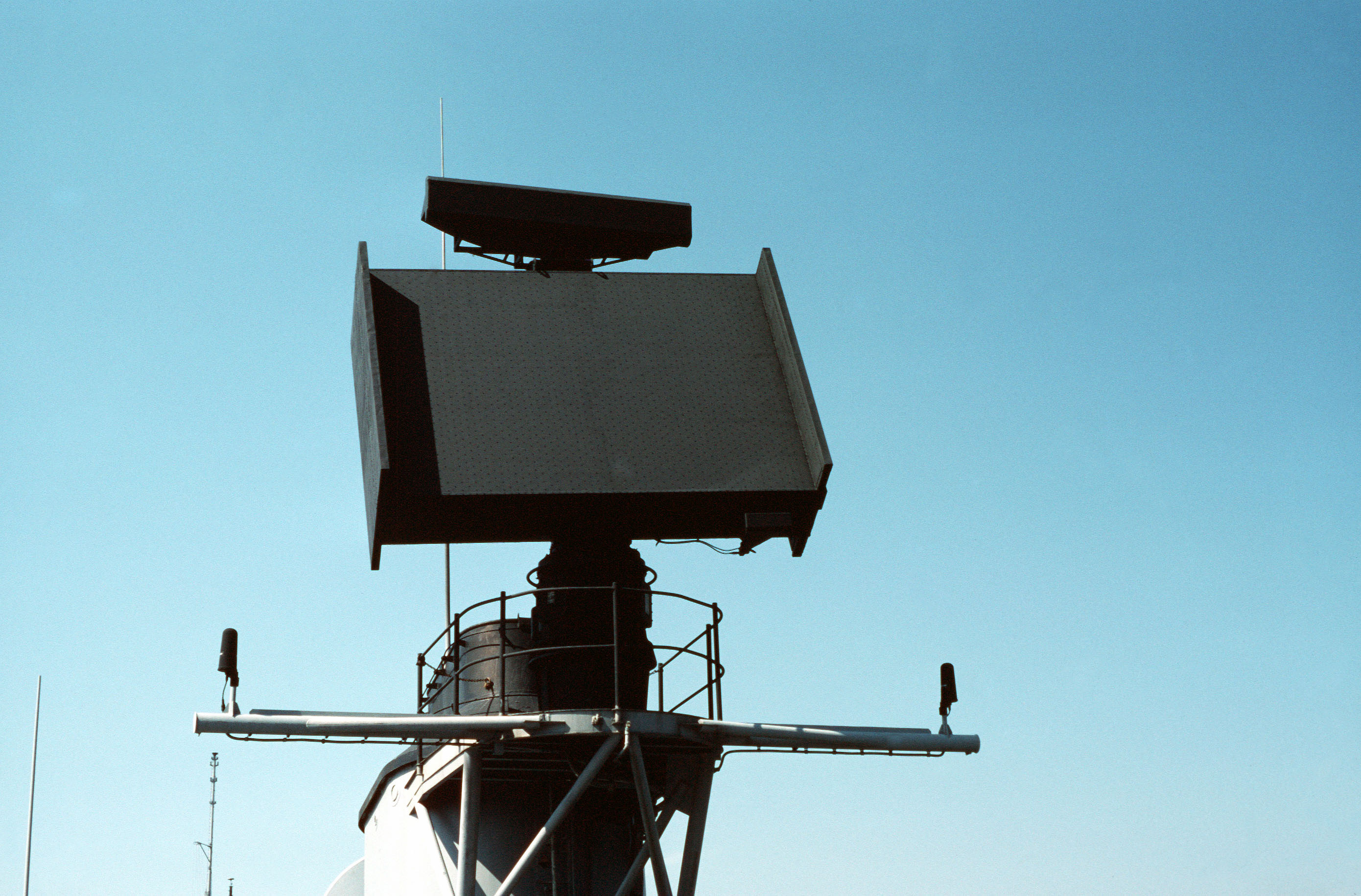
AN/SPS-39 aboard USS Richard E. Byrd (DDG-23) with AN/SPA-72 antenna

The AN/SPS-52 was a development of the AN/SPS-39, incorporating a new planar antenna, a parametric amplifier, and a wide-pulse feature for longer range. It is externally indistinguishable from SPS-39 with the Series III field change.

The AN/SPA-72B antenna used by the AN/SPS-52 is a planar array, tilted back 25 degrees to allow for high-elevation coverage. The array is a collection of rows of slotted waveguides, fed from a feed system running the length of one side of the total wave assembly. Scanning in the vertical plane is achieved by feeding the antenna different frequencies.

As of the AN/SPS-52C revision, this radar has four modes of operation: high angle, long range, high data rate, and Moving Target Indicator (MTI). The primary mode is high angle, which provides coverage to approximately 180 miles and elevation up to 45°. In the long range mode, the radar has a range of approximately 300 miles and an elevation of approximately 13°. The high data rate mode has a range of approximately 110 miles with an elevation of approximately 45° and is used to acquire pop-up and close-in targets quickly. The MTI mode provides coverage up to 70 miles and up to 38 degrees and is intended for high-clutter environments.

== See also ==
- List of radars
- List of military electronics of the United States
