= AN/SPS-10 =

Cold War-era naval 2D surface-search radar

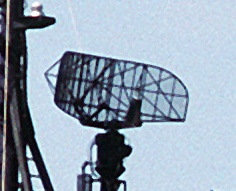
- AN/SPS-10 aboard a Knox-class frigate
- Country of origin: United States
- Manufacturer: Raytheon Technologies
- Introduced: 1959; 67 years ago
- Type: 2D
- Frequency: 5.45 to 5.825 GHz (5.50 to 5.15 cm); C-band
- PRF: 650 Hz
- Beamwidth: 1.9° × 16° vertical, 12° horizontal
- Pulsewidth: 1.3 μs
- RPM: 15 rpm fixed
- Range: 50 miles (43 nmi; 80 km)
- Power: 190 kW peak (short pulse); 280 kW peak (long pulse)
- Other names: AN/SPS-10B, AN/SPS-10E, AN/SPS-10F

AN/SPS-10 is a two-dimensional surface-search radar manufactured by Raytheon Technologies. It was used by the US Navy after World War II and was equipped aboard naval ships throughout the Cold War. Variants include AN/SPS-10B, AN-SPS/10E, and AN/SPS-10F.

In accordance with the Joint Electronics Type Designation System (JETDS), the "AN/SPS-10" designation represents the 10th design of an Army-Navy electronic device for surface ship search radar system. The JETDS system also now is used to name all Department of Defense electronic systems.

== History ==
The SPS-10 was first introduced in 1959 during the Fleet Rehabilitation and Modernization, during which it was equipped aboard Gearing-class, Fletcher-class, Allen M. Sumner-class, and Benson-class destroyers. It became a standard radar for US Navy ships throughout the subsequent phases of the Cold War. By 1998, the radar had been replaced in service by AN/SPS-55.

== On board ships ==
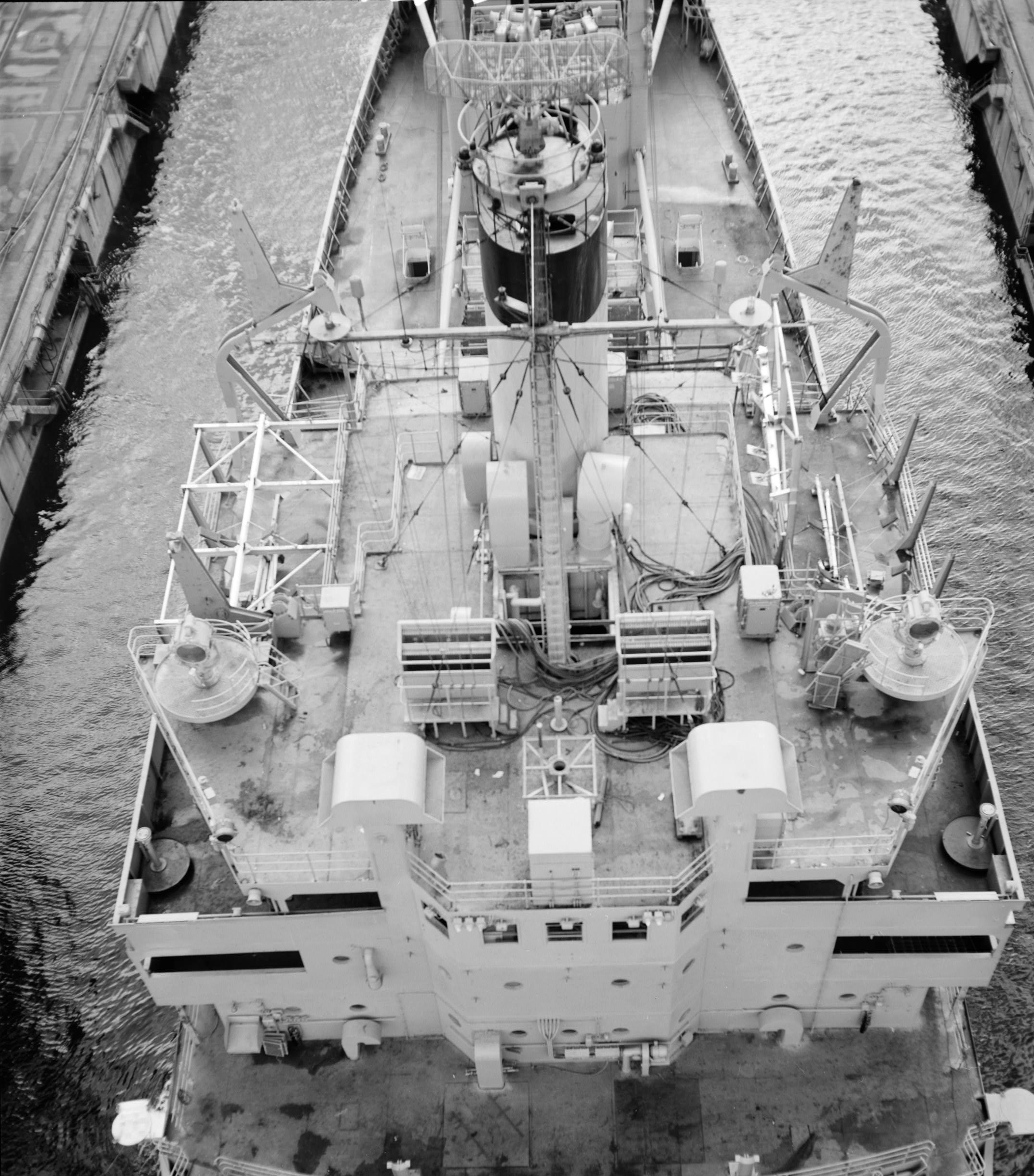
AN/SPS-10 aboard USS Bellatrix

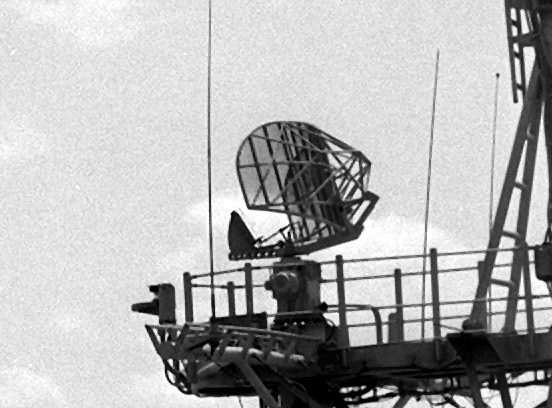
AN/SPS-10 aboard USS Raleigh

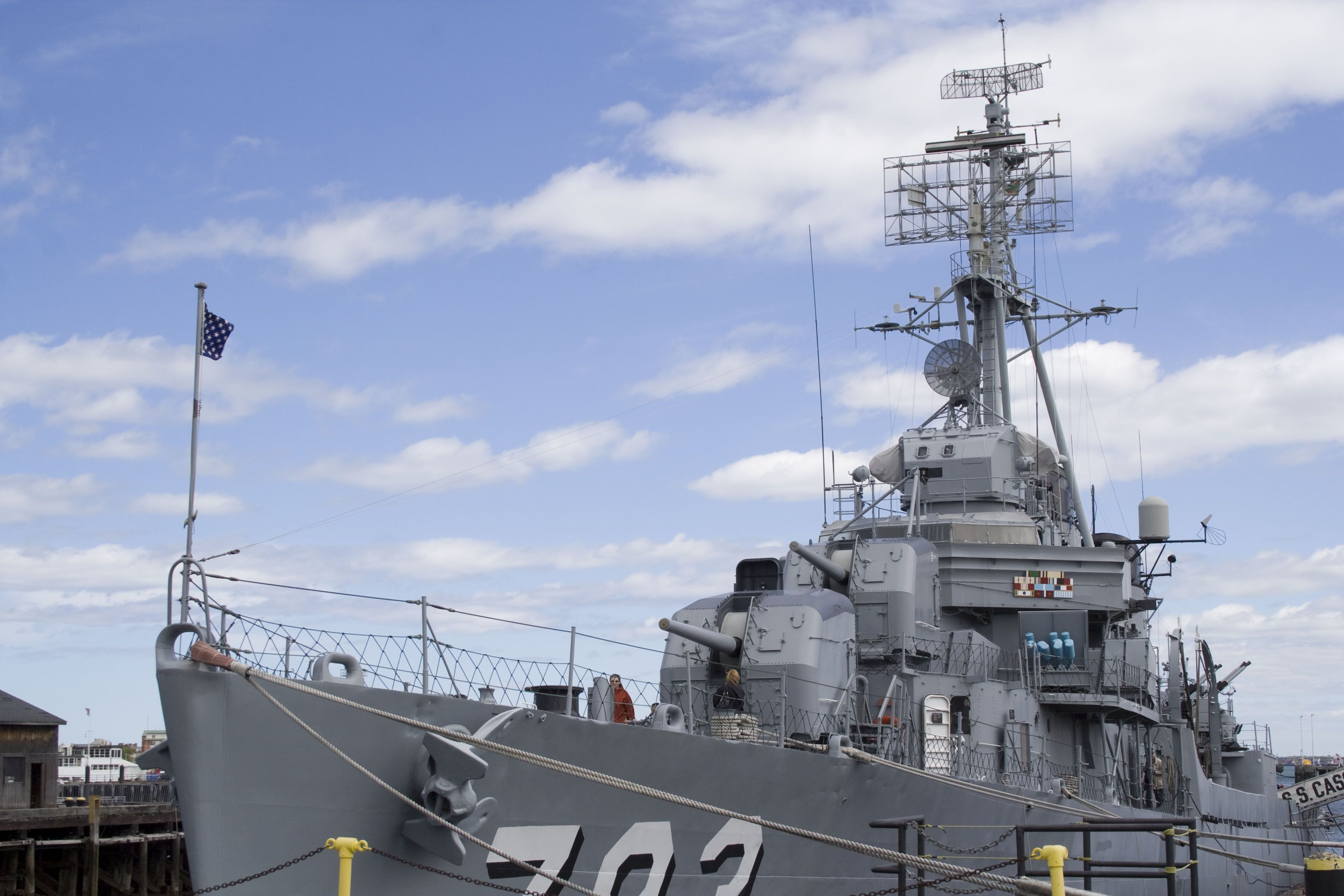
AN/SPS-10 aboard USS Cassin Young

=== United States ===
- Aircraft carriers: Essex-class, Forrestal-class, Kitty Hawk-class and USS Enterprise
- Battleships: Iowa-class
- Command ships: Blue Ridge-class
- Cruisers: Albany-class, Belknap-class, Boston-class, Baltimore-class, Galveston-class, Leahy-class, Providence-class, Worcester-class, and USS Long Beach
- Destroyers: Allen M. Sumner-class, Benson-class, Charles F. Adams-class, Farragut-class, Fletcher-class, Forrest Sherman-class, Gearing-class, Mitscher-class
- Destroyer escorts: Claud Jones-class, Dealey-class, Edsall-class
- Frigates: Bronstein-class, Brooke-class, Garcia-class, Knox-class
- Fast combat support ships: Sacramento-class
- Ammunition ships: Kilauea-class
- Amphibious transport docks: Raleigh-class
- Dock landing ships: Thomaston-class
- Replenishment oilers: Neosho-class, Wichita-class
- Combat stores ships: Alstede-class, Mars-class

=== Canada ===
- Aircraft carriers: HMCS Bonaventure
- Destroyers: Annapolis-class, Mackenzie-class, Restigouche-class, St. Laurent-class

== See also ==
- List of radars
- List of military electronics of the United States
- Radar configurations and types
- Surface-search radar

== Bibliography ==
- Norman Friedman (2006). The Naval Institute Guide to World Naval Weapon Systems. Naval Institute Press. ISBN 9781557502629
- Self-Defense Force Equipment Yearbook 2006-2007. Asaun News Agency. ISBN 4-7509-1027-9
