= Meroka CIWS =

Spanish weapon system

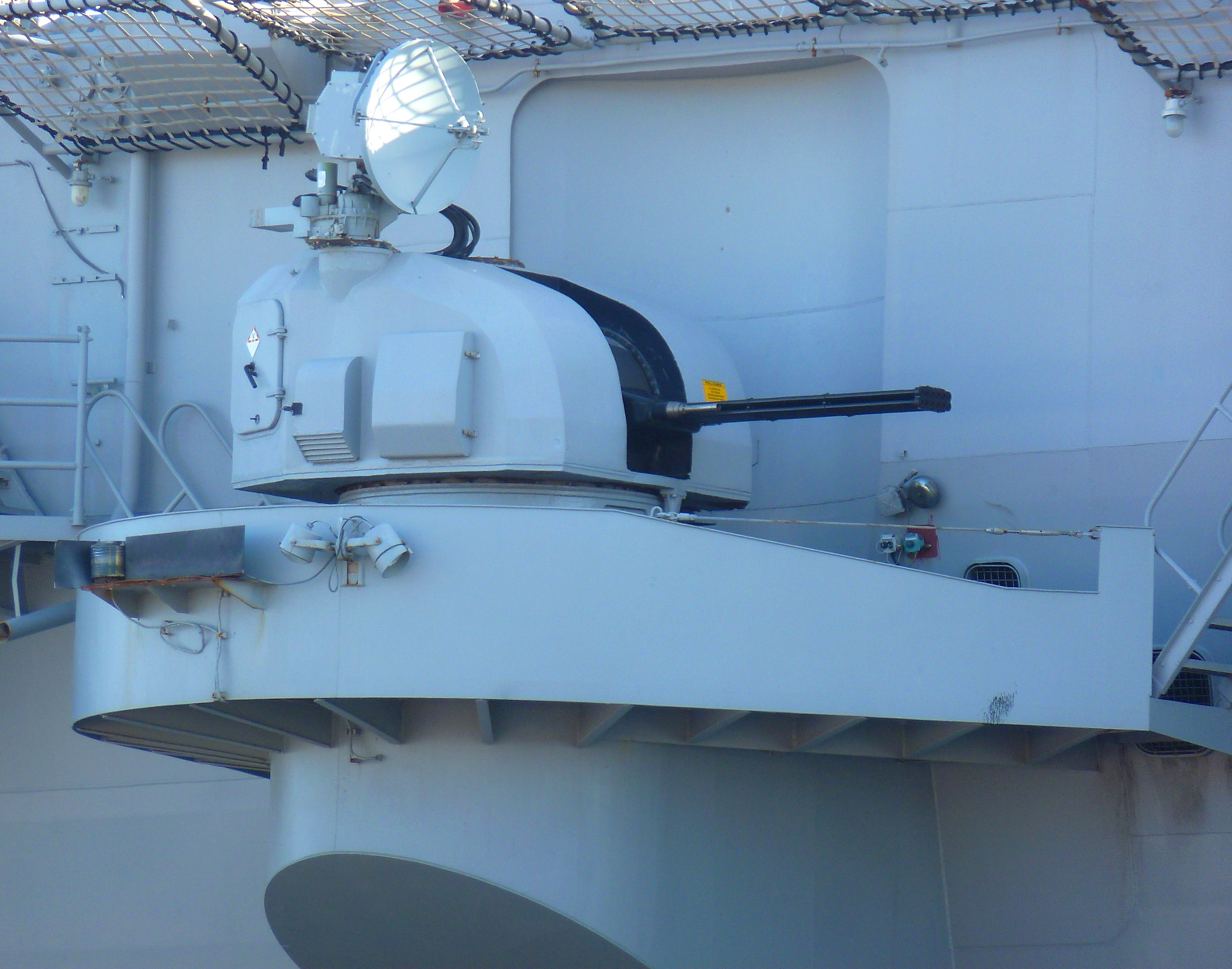
Meroka on Spanish aircraft carrier Principe de Asturias (R-11)

The Meroka CIWS is a Spanish Navy 12 barrelled 20 mm close-in weapon system (CIWS), using twelve Oerlikon 20 mm/12 guns mounted in 2 rows of 6 guns each. The system's primary purpose is defence against anti-ship missiles, and other precision guided weapons. However, it can also be employed against aircraft, watercraft, coastal targets, and floating mines. The weapon is mounted primarily on Spanish naval vessels, from frigate size upwards.

In the early to mid-2000s, the system and the logistics chain ceased to be in service, the weapons remained installed on the ships due to the cost of dismantling them. At present (2024), these weapons can be seen not in use on the Santa María class units, with the exception of the F-86 Frigate Canarias, in which it was replaced by an anti-drone system in 2023.

The term MeRoKa (from German Mehrrohrkanone, meaning multi-barrelled gun) can refer to weapons such as the Nordenfelt gun but is more commonly used referring to this naval CIWS defence system. The "Meroka" was developed and produced by the Spanish firm FABA Sistemas (Fábrica de Artillería Bazán).

== Description ==
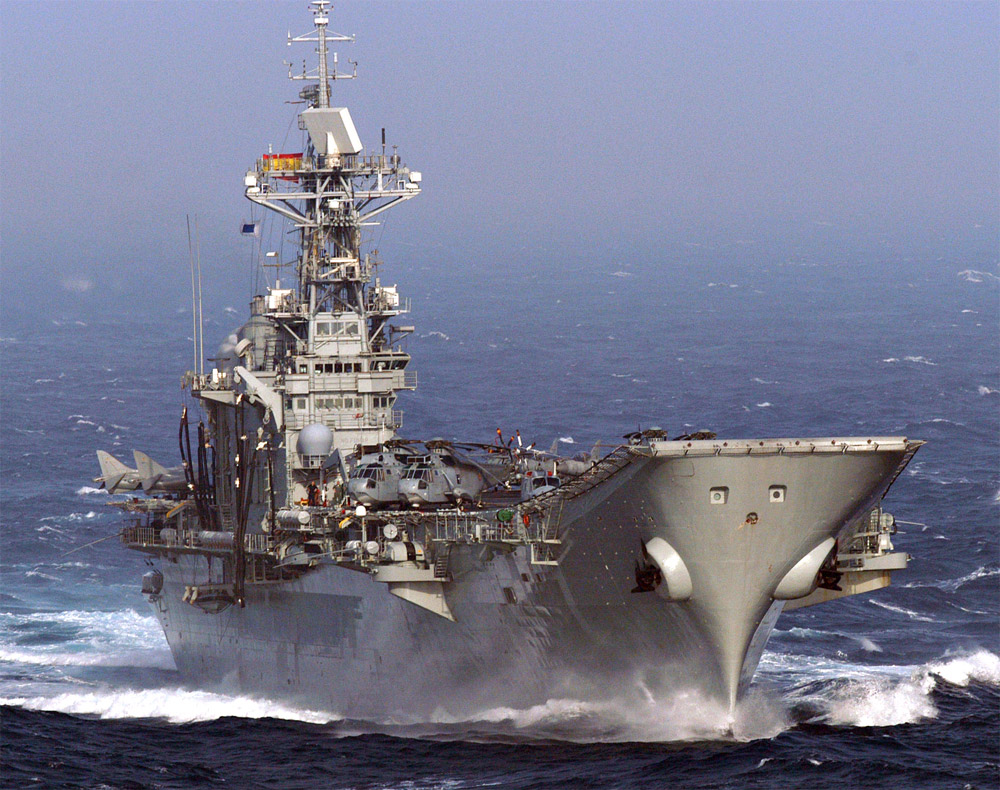
Aircraft carrier Príncipe de Asturias (R-11) in 2004. One of the four MEROKA turrets mounted on each side can be seen

Unlike a rotary cannon, the Meroka CIWS uses individual guns firing in salvos or simultaneously; the barrels are purposely skewed in order to expand the impact area. The guns are mounted in an enclosed automatic turret and are directed by radar or an optronic thermal controlling system.

The original version of the Meroka CIWS was directed by a separate off-mount radar system. This was later changed to an on-mount Lockheed Electronics PVS-2 Sharpshooter I-band radar. The radar is designed to acquire targets at 5,500 yards (5,000 meters), with the Meroka achieving first impact at 1,640 yards (1,500 meters) and destruction of the target at 550 yards (500 meters). Later versions included an optronic targeting system, as a backup in high electronic jamming conditions. More recent modifications included an Israeli designed IR tracker and other electronic devices of Spanish design supplied by Indra Sistemas.

== Specifications ==
- Gun: 12 × Oerlikon 20 mm/120.
- Weight: 4,500 kg (9,900 lb).
- Elevation: -15° to +85°.
- Traverse: 360°.
- Muzzle velocity: 1,290 m/s (4,200 ft/s).
- Rate of fire: 1,440 rounds per minute cyclic (for all twelve barrels).
- Ammunition: Fixed (APDS-T) 720 rounds in a magazine, 60 rounds per barrel.
- Weapons range: Effective range with APDS-T (0.102 kg with sabot), roughly 1,500–2,000 meters.
- Search and track systems: Lockheed Electronics PVS-2 Sharpshooter I-band radar, Indra Thermal Imager.

== See also ==
- Gast Gun
- Phalanx CIWS
- Volley gun
