= USS Jack Williams =

United States Navy frigate

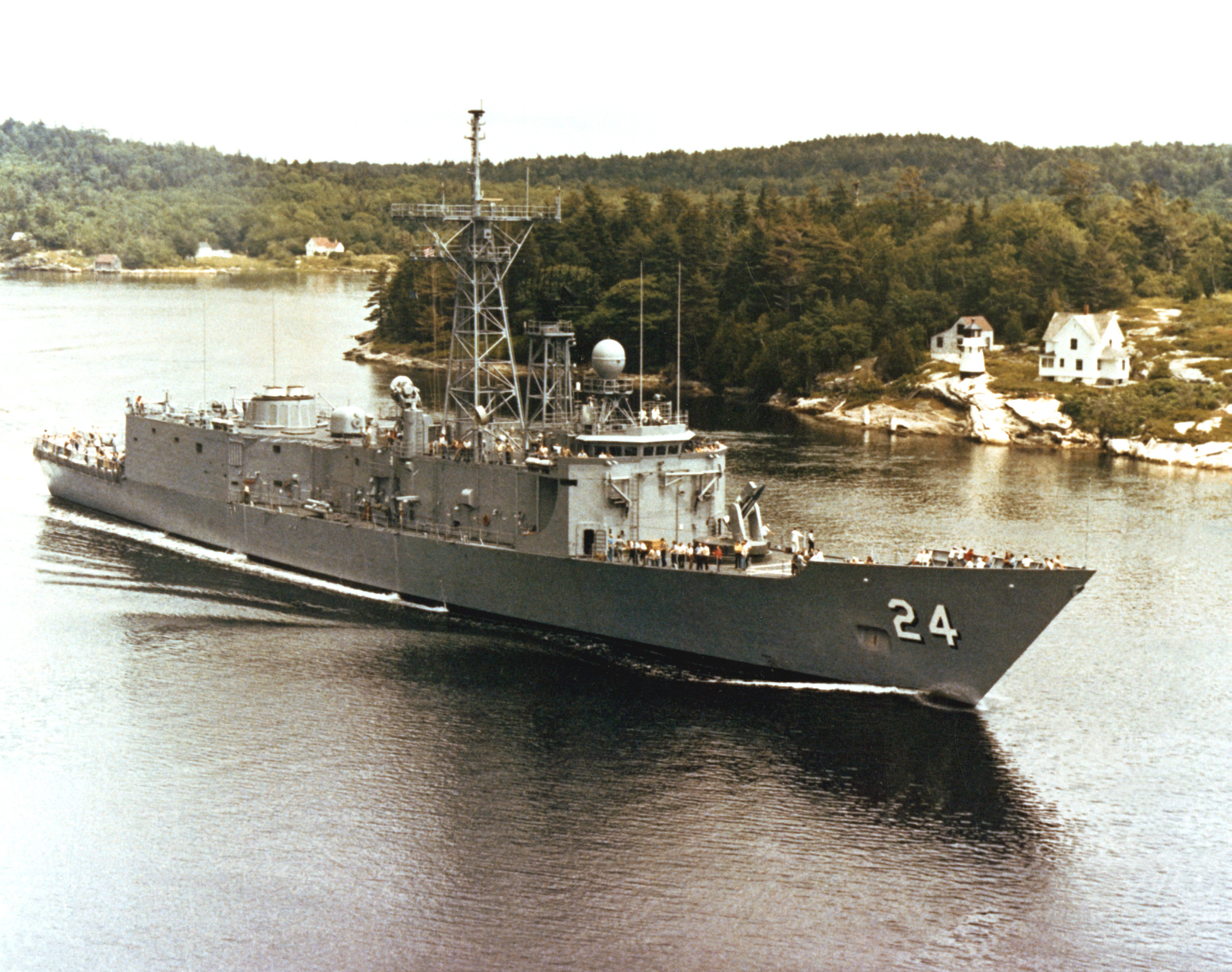
- USS Jack Williams (FFG-24) on 1 March 1983

History

United States
- Name: Jack Williams
- Namesake: U.S. Navy Pharmacist Mate, Jack Williams
- Ordered: 28 February 1977
- Builder: Bath Iron Works, Bath, Maine
- Laid down: 25 February 1980
- Launched: 30 August 1980
- Sponsored by: Mrs. Fern Williams Carr, sister of PhM3c Williams
- Commissioned: 19 September 1981
- Decommissioned: 13 September 1996
- Stricken: 13 September 1996
- Home port: Mayport, Florida
- Identification: Hull symbol:FFG-24; Code letters:NNJW
- Motto: Guardez Bien; (Guard Well)
- Nickname(s): The Arky
- Fate: Transferred to Bahrain as RBNS Sabha, 1996

General characteristics
- Class & type: Oliver Hazard Perry-class frigate
- Displacement: 4,100 long tons (4,200 t), full load
- Length: 445 feet (136 m), overall
- Beam: 45 feet (14 m)
- Draught: 22 feet (6.7 m)
- Propulsion: 2 × General Electric LM2500-30 gas turbines generating 41,000 shp (31 MW) through a single shaft and variable pitch propeller; 2 × Auxiliary Propulsion Units, 350 hp (260 kW) retractable electric azimuth thrusters for maneuvering and docking.
- Speed: over 29 knots (54 km/h)
- Range: 5,000 nautical miles at 18 knots (9,300 km at 33 km/h)
- Complement: 15 officers and 190 enlisted, plus SH-60 LAMPS detachment of roughly six officer pilots and 15 enlisted maintainers
- Sensors & processing systems: AN/SPS-49 air-search radar; AN/SPS-55 surface-search radar; CAS and STIR fire-control radar; AN/SQS-56 sonar.
- Electronic warfare & decoys: AN/SLQ-32
- Armament: As built: 1 × OTO Melara Mk 75 76 mm/62 caliber naval gun; 2 × Mk 32 triple-tube (324 mm) launchers for Mark 46 torpedoes; 1 × Vulcan Phalanx CIWS; 4 × .50-cal (12.7 mm) machine guns.; 1 × Mk 13 Mod 4 single-arm launcher for Harpoon anti-ship missiles and SM-1MR Standard anti-ship/air missiles (40 round magazine); Note: As of 2004, Mk 13 systems removed from all active US vessels of this class.
- Aircraft carried: 1 × SH-2F LAMPS I

USS Jack Williams (FFG-24), sixteenth ship of the Oliver Hazard Perry-class of guided-missile frigates, was named for Pharmacist's Mate Third Class Jack Williams, who was posthumously awarded the Medal of Honor for his heroism in the Battle of Iwo Jima.

== Construction and career ==
Ordered from Bath Iron Works, Bath, Maine, on 28 February 1977 as part of the FY77 program, Jack Williams was laid down on 25 February 1980; launched on 30 August 1980, sponsored by Mrs. Fern Williams Carr, sister of PhM3c Williams; and commissioned on 19 September 1981.

in 1983, the ship accidentally launched a live MK-46 torpedo while berthed at Naval Station Mayport in Florida. The torpedo skidded across the top of a concrete pier but did not detonate.

Decommissioned and stricken on 13 September 1996, she was transferred to Bahrain the same day and recommissioned as RBNS Sabha (90).

Jack Williams (FFG-24) was the first ship of that name in the US Navy.
