= RBNS Sabha =

Frigate in the Royal Bahraini Naval Force

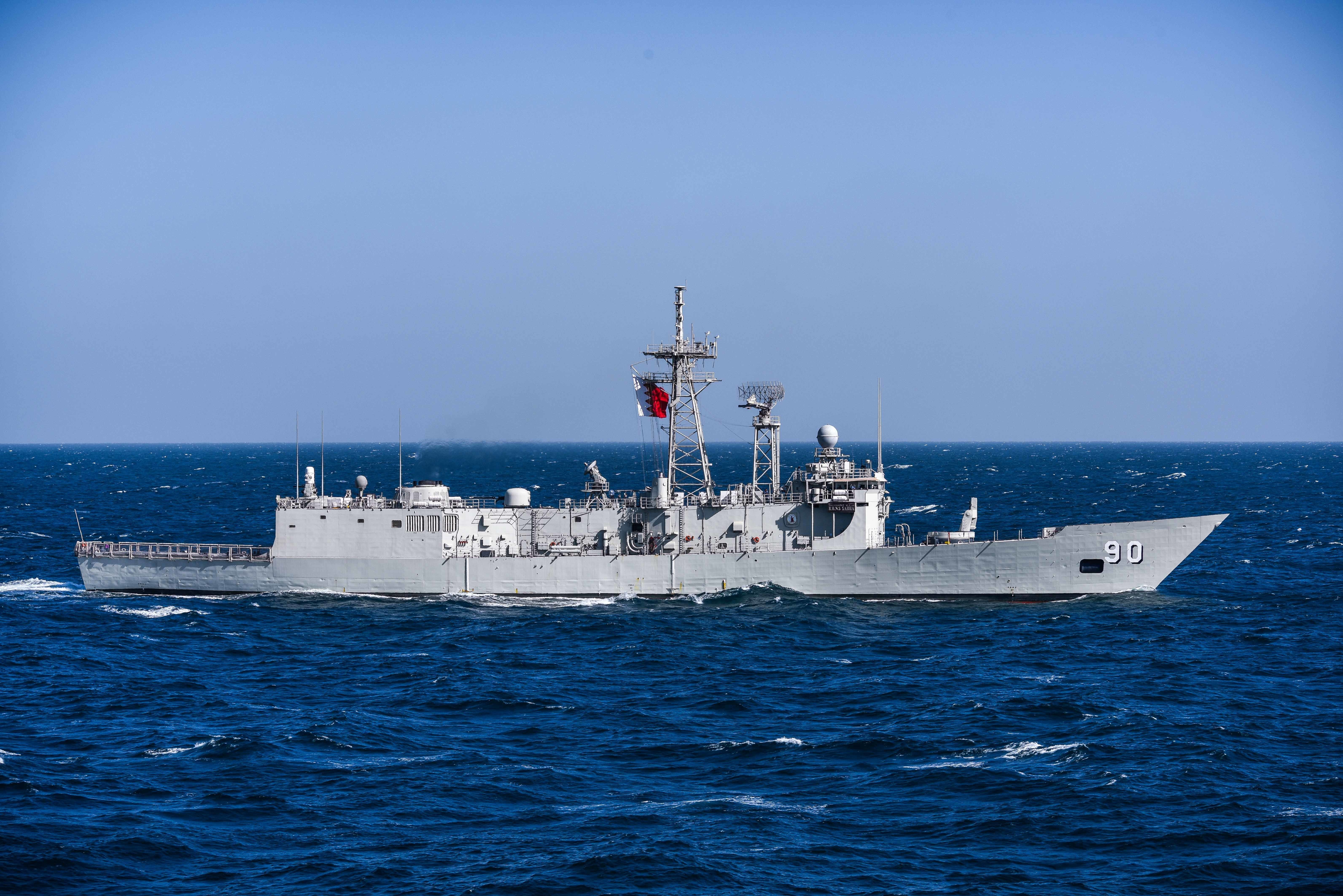
- RBNS Sabha transits the Persian Gulf on 16 January 2018

History

United States
- Name: USS Jack Williams (FFG-24)
- Namesake: Jack Williams
- Ordered: 28 February 1977
- Builder: Bath Iron Works
- Laid down: 25 February 1980
- Launched: 30 August 1980
- Commissioned: 19 September 1981
- Decommissioned: 13 September 1996
- Fate: Transferred to Bahrain on; 13 September 1996

Bahrain
- Name: RBNS Sabha (90); (ﺱﻡﺏ صبحا)
- Namesake: Sabha sea fort, Zubarah
- Acquired: 13 September 1996
- Commissioned: 25 February 1997
- Status: In service

General characteristics
- Class & type: Oliver Hazard Perry-class frigate
- Displacement: 4,100 long tons (4,200 t), full load
- Length: 453 feet (138 m), overall
- Beam: 45 feet (14 m)
- Draft: 22 feet (6.7 m)
- Propulsion: 2 × General Electric LM2500-30 gas turbines generating 41,000 shp (31 MW) through a single shaft and variable pitch propeller; 2 × Auxiliary Propulsion Units, 350 hp (260 kW) retractable electric azimuth thrusters for maneuvering and docking.
- Speed: over 29 knots (54 km/h)
- Range: 5,000 nautical miles at 18 knots (9,300 km at 33 km/h)
- Complement: 15 officers and 190 enlisted, plus SH-60 LAMPS detachment of roughly six officer pilots and 15 enlisted maintainers
- Sensors & processing systems: AN/SPS-49 air-search radar; AN/SPS-55 surface-search radar; CAS and STIR fire-control radar; AN/SQS-56 sonar.
- Armament: As built: 1 × OTO Melara Mk 75 76 mm/62 caliber naval gun; 2 × Mk 32 triple-tube (324 mm) launchers for Mark 46 torpedoes; 1 × Vulcan Phalanx CIWS; 4 × .50-cal (12.7 mm) machine guns.; 1 × Mk 13 Mod 4 single-arm launcher for Harpoon anti-ship missiles and SM-1MR Standard anti-ship/air missiles (40 round magazine); Note: As of 2004, Mk 13 systems removed from all active US vessels of this class.
- Aircraft carried: 2 × SH-60 LAMPS III helicopters

RBNS Sabha (90) (Arabic: ﺱﻡﺏ صبحا) is an Oliver Hazard Perry-class frigate in service with the Royal Bahrain Naval Force. The ship was former United States Navy frigate USS Jack Williams (FFG-24). The frigate is now considered as the lead frigate of the Royal Bahrain Naval Force.

== Construction and career ==
During its career as USS Jack Williams (FFG-24) in the United States, it was the sixteenth ship of the Oliver Hazard Perry class of guided-missile frigates. It was named for Pharmacist's Mate Second Class Jack Williams, who was posthumously awarded the Medal of Honor for his heroism in the Battle of Iwo Jima.

The frigate was ordered from Bath Iron Works on 28 February 1977 as part of the FY77 Program. Jack Williams was laid down on 25 February 1980; launched on 30 August 1980 and commissioned on 19 September 1981. Decommissioned and stricken on 13 September 1996, she was transferred to Bahrain the same day as a gift.

The ship was formally recommissioned as the RBNS Sabha (90) on 25 February 1997. The frigate was named after a sea fort in Zubarah (located in today Qatar), historically belonged to Al Khalifa royal family of Bahrain. Sabha arrived in the Persian Gulf in June 1997 for a workup and crew training.

Sabha participated in Saudi-led Operation Restoring Hope in Yemen, returning to Bahraini waters in December 2015.

== See also ==
- Bahrain Defense Force
