= 2/8 =

2/8 can mean:

- February 8 or 2 August, depending on date format
- 2nd Battalion 8th Marines, an infantry battalion in the United States Marine Corps
- A time signature, a notational convention used in Western musical notation
