= Ray L. Smith =

United States Marine Corps general

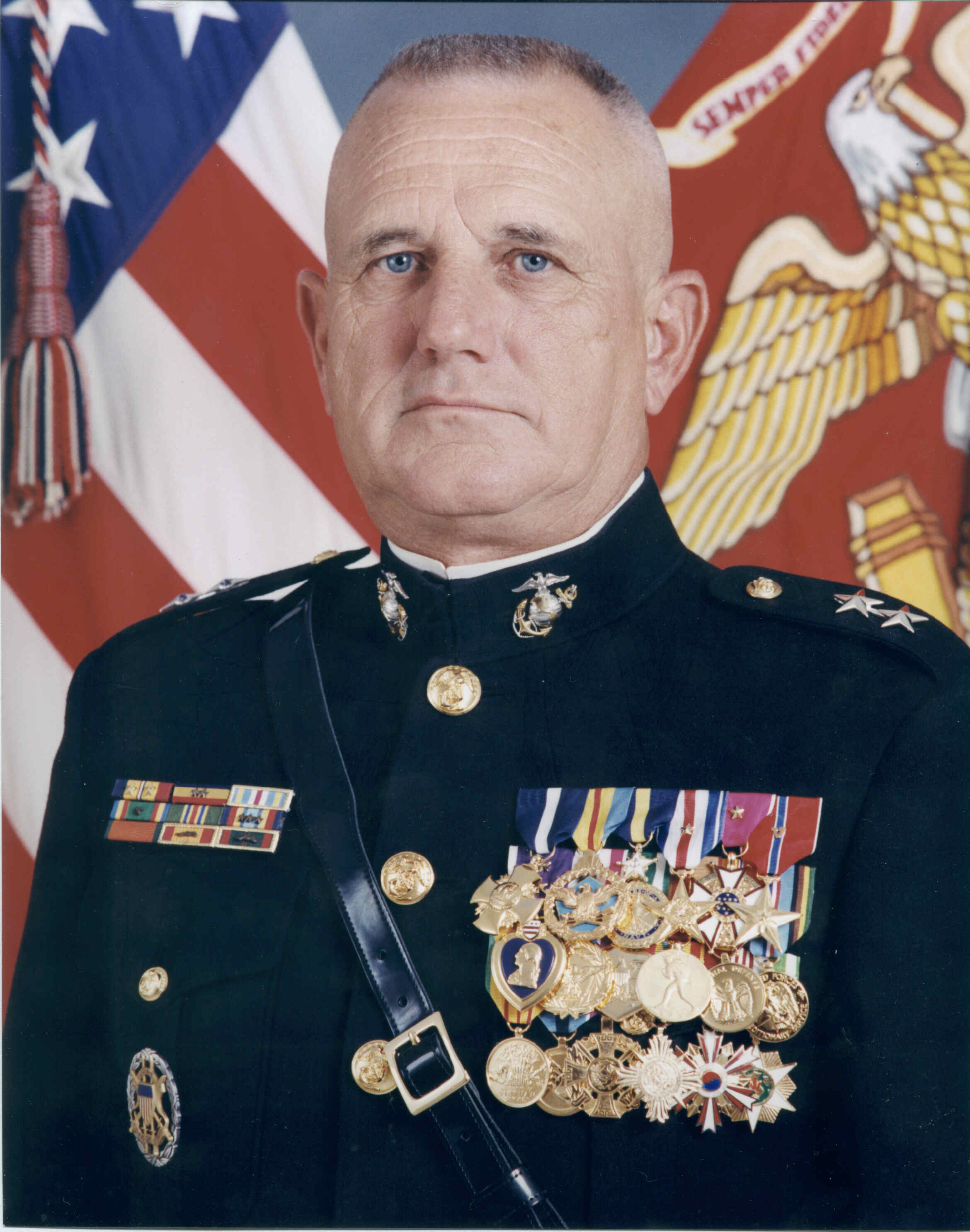
- Major General Ray L. Smith
- Military career
- Allegiance: United States of America
- Branch: United States Marine Corps
- Service years: 1965–1999
- Rank: Major General
- Nickname: E-Tool
- Commands: 2nd Battalion, 8th Marines; 8th Marine Regiment; 3rd Marine Division; Marine Corps Base Camp Lejeune
- Conflicts: Vietnam War: Tet Offensive
- Awards: Navy Cross; Navy Distinguished Service Medal – Defense DSM – Navy and Marine Corps DSM; Silver Star (2); Legion of Merit (2); Bronze Star with V device Purple Heart (3)
- Other work: Author

Ray L. Smith is a highly decorated retired United States Marine Corps major general. Smith was a combat veteran — receiving the Navy Cross for his heroic actions during the Vietnam War, as well as two Silver Stars, the Bronze Star, and three Purple Hearts. Smith retired from the Marine Corps in 1999 after almost 34 years of service. In 2003, after nearly four years of retirement, Smith went to Iraq with the 1st Marine Division; and penned an eyewitness account of the march from Kuwait to Baghdad — The March Up: Taking Baghdad with the 1st Marine Division.

== Marine Corps career ==
Smith is a native of Oklahoma. He enlisted in the Marine Corps in Montana in December 1965. He graduated as the Platoon and Series Honorman at Marine Corps Recruit Depot, San Diego in 1966. In March 1967, he graduated from Officer Candidates School and from The Basic School in August 1967.

=== Vietnam War ===
Smith deployed for his 1st tour to Republic of Vietnam with the 1st Marine Division from 7 October 1967 to 25 October 1968. During this time Lt. Smith served as a rifle platoon commander (4 months) and company commander (9 months) in Alpha Co, 1st Battalion, 1st Marines, seeing combat action in Hue, Khe Sanh, the Rockpile, Con Thien, "Dodge City" and south of Da Nang. He was awarded the Silver Star for his actions during the Tet Offensive. He was awarded a second Silver Star for actions on hill 689 at KheSanh in early July. His next assignment was in the 5th Marine Division at Camp Pendleton, California where he served in 3/28 as a Platoon Commander, Company Commander and as interim Aide for General Ross Dwyer. In November 1969, Lt. Smith was assigned to a one-year Vietnamese Language School in Arlington, Virginia. In late 1970, he returned to Camp Pendleton for duty on an Interrogation Team for four months and was then assigned to 2/5 until he was sent to the John F. Kennedy School of Special Warfare at Ft. Bragg, North Carolina. Captain Smith returned to Vietnam in November 1971 for duty with the Marine Advisory Unit. He was with the Vietnamese Marines during the Easter Offensive and Counter Offensive of 1972.

=== Navy Cross Citation ===
Captain Ray L. Smith was awarded the Navy Cross for his actions on April 1, 1972, when he was acting as an advisor to the Vietnamese Marine Corps. His citation reads:

The President of the United States of America takes pleasure in presenting the Navy Cross to Captain Ray Louis Smith (MCSN: 0-102290), United States Marine Corps, for extraordinary heroism during the period 30 March to 1 April 1972 while serving as advisor to a Vietnamese Command group numbering approximately 250 Vietnamese Marines located on a small hilltop outpost in the Republic of Vietnam. With the Command Group repulsing several savage enemy assaults, and subjected to a continuing hail of fire from an attacking force estimated to be of two-battalion strength, Captain Smith repeatedly exposed himself to the heavy fire while directing friendly air support. When adverse weather conditions precluded further close air support, he attempted to lead the group, now reduced to only 28 Vietnamese Marines, to the safety of friendly lines. An enemy soldier opened fire upon the Marines at the precise moment that they had balked when encountering an outer defensive ring of barbed wire. Captain Smith returned accurate fire, disposing of the attacker, and then threw himself backwards on top of the booby-trap-infested wire barrier. Swiftly, the remaining Marines moved over the crushed wire, stepping on Captain Smith's prostrate body, until all had passed safely through the barrier. Although suffering severe cuts and bruises, Captain Smith succeeded in leading the Marines to the safety of friendly lines. His great personal valor and unrelenting devotion to duty reflected the highest credit upon himself, the Marine Corps and the United States Naval Service.

=== 1st Silver Star Citation ===
The President of the United States of America takes pleasure in presenting the Silver Star to Second Lieutenant Ray Louis Smith (MCSN: 0-102290), United States Marine Corps Reserve, for conspicuous gallantry and intrepidity in action while serving as Commanding Officer of Company A, First Battalion, First Marines, FIRST Marine Division (Rein.), FMF, in connection with operations against the enemy in the Republic of Vietnam. On 4 February 1968, while participating in Operation HUE CITY, Second Lieutenant Smith's unit was assigned the mission of attacking and seizing a school complex occupied by an estimated battalion of North Vietnamese Army Regulars. As his company advanced toward its objective, the Marines came under intense automatic weapons, small arms and B-40 rocket fire, pinning down the lead platoon. Reacting instantly, he aggressively maneuvered his remaining platoons forward and directed a heavy volume of fire against the entrenched enemy, suppressing the hostile fire sufficiently to allow his lead platoon to maneuver out of the hazardous area. Concerned with maintaining the momentum of the attack, he repeatedly exposed himself to the enemy fire to better direct the efforts and movements of his forces. Knocked to the ground on numerous occasions by the concussion from nearby explosions, he quickly regained his footing and continued to lead his most heavily engaged units. When it appeared that the assault was faltering, he skillfully employed a recoilless rifle team in addition to a demolition unit against the well entrenched enemy, enabling his unit to move from one building to another in its relentless attack. His bold leadership and aggressive actions were an inspiration to all who served with him and contributed significantly to the accomplishment of his unit's mission. By his courage, steadfast determination and unwavering devotion to duty in the face of extreme personal danger, Second Lieutenant Smith upheld the highest traditions of the Marine Corps and of the United States Naval Service.

=== 2nd Silver Star Citation ===
The President of the United States of America takes pleasure in presenting a Gold Star in lieu of a Second Award of the Silver Star to First Lieutenant Ray Louis Smith (MCSN: 0-102290), United States Marine Corps Reserve, for conspicuous gallantry and intrepidity in action while serving as Commanding Officer of Company A, First Battalion, First Marines, FIRST Marine Division (Rein.), FMF, in connection with operations against the enemy in the Republic of Vietnam. On the night of 7 July 1968, Company A was assigned to assist in repulsing two North Vietnamese Army companies that had penetrated the battalion defensive perimeter on Hill 689 near the Khe Sanh Combat Base. Observing the intense enemy mortar and anti-tank rocket fire and realizing the seriousness of the situation, First Lieutenant Smith unhesitatingly led his men across 100 meters of fire-swept terrain to the beleaguered unit's positions. Ignoring the hostile rounds impacting near him, he skillfully deployed his platoons on line behind the containing forces and commenced his attack against the enemy. Although painfully wounded, First Lieutenant Smith fearlessly moved about the hazardous area shouting words of encouragement to his men and skillfully directing their fire against the North Vietnamese soldiers. With complete disregard for his own safety, he calmly coordinated the evacuation of casualties while resolutely leading his Marines in driving the enemy from the perimeter and subsequently re-establishing the battalion's defensive integrity. His bold initiative and heroic actions inspired all who served with him and were instrumental in the accomplishment of the dangerous mission. By his courage, aggressive leadership and steadfast devotion to duty in the face of great personal danger, First Lieutenant Smith upheld the highest traditions of the Marine Corps and of the United States Naval Service.

=== Post-Vietnam ===
After this tour Captain Smith was assigned as a student at the Amphibious Warfare School in Quantico, Virginia and then, from 1973 to 1976, as a company XO, SPC and tactics instructor at The Basic School. In July 1976, he was ordered to MEPCOM at Ft. Sheridan, Illinois, where he served two years as the secretary to the General Staff. He was promoted to major in August 1977.

Major Smith was selected to participate in the Bootstrap Program and reported to Oklahoma State in August 1978. He earned a bachelor's degree in Asian studies in January 1980 and was then transferred to the Armed Forces Staff College in Norfolk, Virginia.

In July 1980, Major Smith reported to Camp Lejeune, North Carolina and was assigned as the executive officer (XO) of 2nd Battalion, 8th Marines until July 1981 when he was assigned as the operation officer (S-3) of the 8th Marine Regiment. In 1983, now lieutenant colonel Smith, after assignments as the executive officer of the 8th Marine Regiment and as the Assistant Chief of Staff (G-3) OPS of the 2nd Marine Division, took command of the 2nd Battalion, 8th Marine Regiment. He commanded BLT 2/8 in Grenada during Operation Urgent Fury and Beirut.

Smith next attended the Naval War College in Newport, Rhode Island, where he earned a master's degree in military science. While there, he also earned a master's degree in international relations from Salve Regina College. In July 1985, he reported to Headquarters Marine Corps for assignments in training and then in Operations. Returning to Camp Lejeune in May 1988, Lieutenant colonel Smith took command of the 8th Marine Regiment from colonel John J. Sheehan on 17 May 1988. He was promoted to Colonel in November 1988. Smith relinquished command of 8th Marines to Col Larry S. Schmidt on 19 June 1990. In July 1990, Colonel Smith was assigned to the Joint Staff at The Pentagon where he was Chief, Asia-Pacific Branch, J5. He was selected for promotion to brigadier general in December 1991.

As a general officer, Smith's his assignments were: Deputy Commanding General (CG), Marine Corps Bases, Japan; CG, 3rd Marine Division; Assistant Chief of Staff for Plans and Policy, CJ-5, Combined Forces Command, United States Forces Korea; Deputy CG, II MEF; CG, Marine Corps Base, Camp Lejeune, North Carolina.

Major General Smith retired on September 1, 1999. On his last day of active duty, he gave the Convocation address at Campbell University and received an honorary Doctorate of Laws.

== In retirement ==
Since retiring, MajGen. Smith opened a consulting business, E-tool Enterprises, and was a partner in Neuse Timber Land Company. Smith served as the president of the board developing the Marine Corps Museum of the Carolinas, on the Board of BOLD, and the Board of Caring Communities. He has served on the Jacksonville USO Executive Council, and the Board of Jacksonville-Onslow Chamber of Commerce 2000–2001 He was also inducted into the Oklahoma Military Hall of Fame and received the Downeast NCOA Mack McKinney Award. He was also a member of the North Carolina Advisory Commission on Military Affairs.

Smith is the co-author, with Bing West, of The March Up: Taking Baghdad with the 1st Marine Division. The book is an eyewitness account of the 1st Marine Division's march from Kuwait to Baghdad at the beginning of the Iraq War.

Smith is a founder and currently serves as Chairman of Sandboxx, a company dedicated to providing communication and life style management tools for military members and their families.

== Awards and decorations ==
General Smith's personal decorations include:

1st Row	Navy Cross		Defense Distinguished Service Medal	Navy Distinguished Service Medal	Office of the Joint Chiefs of Staff Identification Badge
2nd Row	Silver Star w/ 1 award star	Legion of Merit w/ 1 award star	Bronze Star w/ valor device	Purple Heart w/ 2 award stars	Office of the Joint Chiefs of Staff Identification Badge
3rd Row	Defense Meritorious Service Medal w/ 1 oak leaf cluster	Navy and Marine Corps Commendation Medal w/ 1 award star & valor device	Combat Action Ribbon w/ 2 award stars	Navy Presidential Unit Citation w/ 2 service stars	Office of the Joint Chiefs of Staff Identification Badge
4th Row	Joint Meritorious Unit Award	Navy Unit Commendation w/ 1 service star	Navy Meritorious Unit Commendation	Marine Corps Expeditionary Medal	Office of the Joint Chiefs of Staff Identification Badge
5th Row	National Defense Service Medal w/ 1 service star	Armed Forces Expeditionary Medal	Vietnam Service Medal w/ 3 service stars	Humanitarian Service Medal	Office of the Joint Chiefs of Staff Identification Badge
6th Row	Navy Sea Service Deployment Ribbon w/ 3 service stars	Distinguished Service Order	Vietnam Gallantry Cross w/ palm	Vietnam Armed Forces Honor Medal	Office of the Joint Chiefs of Staff Identification Badge
7th Row	Order of National Security Merit, Cheon-Su Medal	Vietnam Gallantry Cross unit citation	Vietnam Civil Actions unit citation	Vietnam Campaign Medal	Office of the Joint Chiefs of Staff Identification Badge

== Publications ==
- MajGen Ray L. Smith, USMC (ret) and Bing West (2003). The March Up: Taking Baghdad with the 1st Marine Division. Bantam. ISBN 0-553-80376-X. "... is a first-hand account of the tactics and strategy of the war"
