= Springfield National Cemetery =

Historic veterans cemetery in Greene County, Missouri

- U.S. National Register of Historic Places
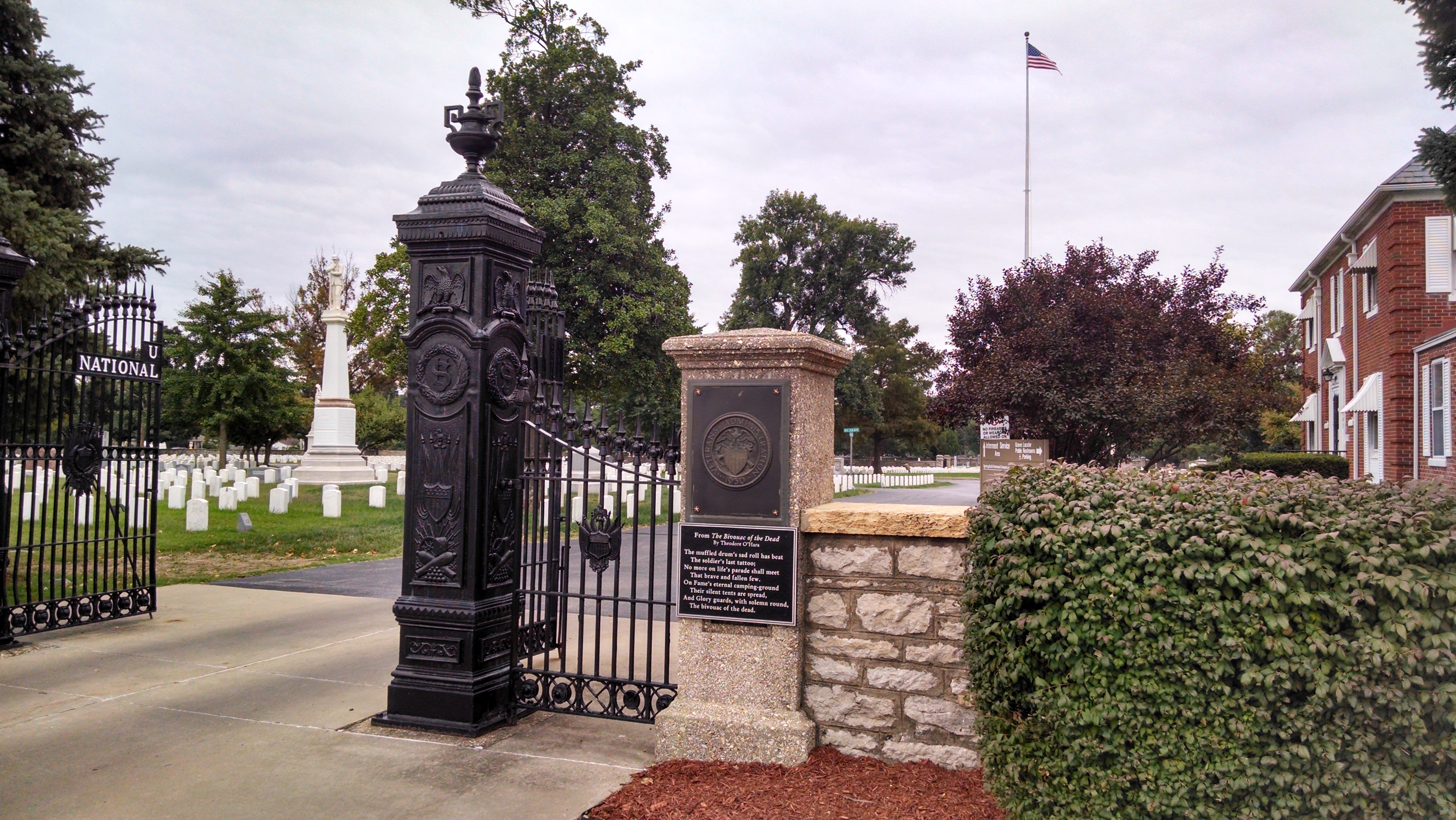
- Springfield National Cemetery

- Location within Missouri Location within the United States
- Location: 1702 E. Seminole St., Springfield, Missouri
- Coordinates: 37°10′23″N 93°15′50″W
- Area: 18.1 acres (7.3 ha)
- Built: 1867
- Architectural style: Colonial Revival
- MPS: Civil War Era National Cemeteries MPS
- NRHP reference No.: 99001045
- Added to NRHP: August 27, 1999

Springfield National Cemetery is a United States National Cemetery located in the city of Springfield, in Greene County, Missouri. Administered by the United States Department of Veterans Affairs, it encompasses 18.1 acres (7.3 ha), and as of the end of 2005, had 14,685 interments.

== History ==
Established in 1867 as a place to initially inter Civil War Union soldiers, many of whom died at the Battle of Wilson's Creek. In 1871 a section for Confederate soldiers was added. It has since been expanded and opened to all veterans, and now has the interred remains of soldiers from wars dating back to the Revolutionary War. The cemetery lends its name to National Avenue in Springfield, which formerly passed by the cemetery prior to the southern expansion of the city decades ago.

== Notable monuments ==
- A marble pillar dedicated to Union General Nathaniel Lyon in 1888.
- A bronze sculpture dedicated to Confederate General Sterling Price in 1901.
- The Battle of Wilson's Creek Memorial.
- A monument dedicated to Pearl Harbor survivors, erected in 1992.
- The Sons and Daughters of the American Revolution Memorial, dedicated to the Continental Army soldiers who died in the Revolutionary War.

== Notable interments ==
- Medal of Honor recipients
  - Sergeant Harrison Collins (1836–1890), for action in the Civil War
  - Corporal Orion P. Howe (1848–1890), for action in the Civil War
  - Pharmacist's Mate Chief Petty Officer Fred H. McGuire (1890–1958), for action in the Philippine–American War
  - Captain Patrick Pentzer (1838–1901), for action in the Civil War
  - Pharmacist's Mate Third Class Jack Williams (1924–1945), for action in World War II
- Others
  - Horton Smith (1908–1963), World War II US Army Air Corps captain and professional golfer
  - Major General Ralph E. Truman (1880–1962), career Army officer
  - Richard Hanson Weightman (1816–1861), Delegate to the US Congress from New Mexico Territory and Civil War Confederate officer
  - Various Buffalo Soldiers
