= Orion P. Howe =

Orion Perseus Howe
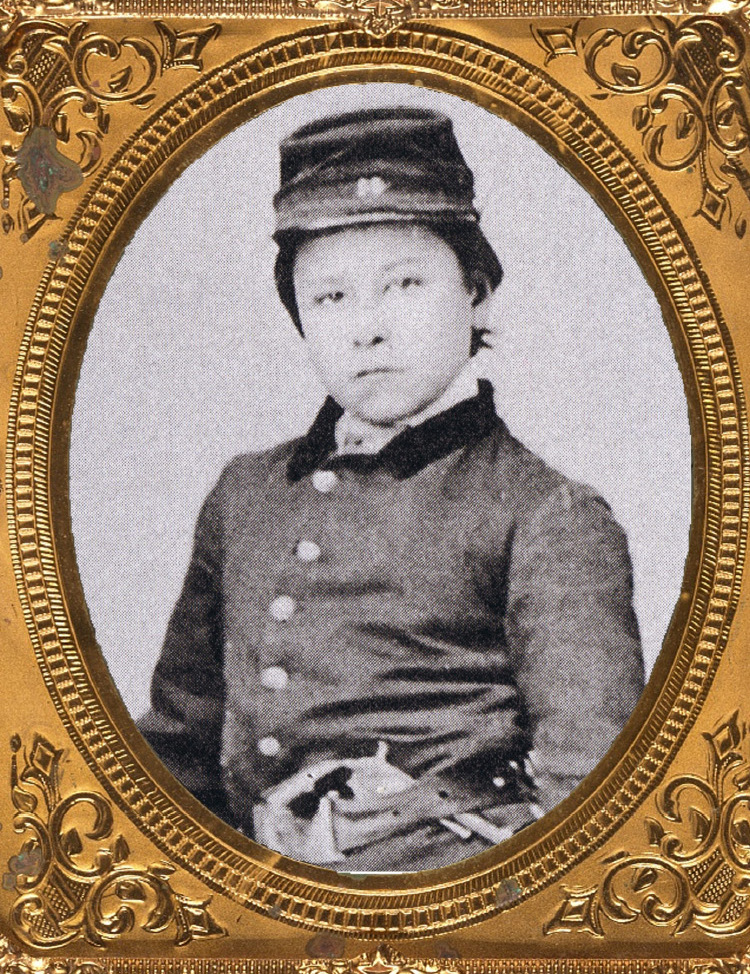
- Born: December 29, 1848; Portage County, Ohio
- Died: January 27, 1930 (aged 81); Springfield, Missouri
- Burial place: Springfield National Cemetery, Springfield, Missouri
- Military career
- Allegiance: United States of America; Union
- Branch: United States Army; Union Army
- Service years: 1861–1864
- Rank: Corporal
- Unit: Company C, 55th Illinois Volunteer Infantry Regiment
- Conflicts: American Civil War: Siege of Vicksburg
- Awards: Medal of Honor

Orion Perseus Howe (December 29, 1848 – January 27, 1930) was among the youngest recipients of the Medal of Honor for his service in the American Civil War as a Union drummer boy. He was awarded the medal on April 23, 1896.

== Early life ==
Howe was born in 1848 in Portage County, Ohio but after his mother died in 1852, the family moved to Waukegan, Illinois. Howe left his home—accompanied by his younger brother, Lyston Druett Howe—when he was 12 to serve in the 55th Illinois Volunteer Infantry Regiment.

== Military career ==
Howe and his brother both served as musicians in the same regiment where their father William, a Mexican–American War veteran, was the regimental band leader. He was awarded the Medal of Honor for remaining upon the field of battle until he had reported to General William Tecumseh Sherman the necessity of supplying cartridges for the use of troops under command of Colonel Oscar Malmborg on May 19, 1863. However, Malmborg had ordered Howe to fetch the wrong caliber of cartridge—.54 caliber instead of the needed .58 caliber. Howe was one of several men who volunteered to complete this task; while the others were killed, Howe was seriously wounded, and it took several months for him to recover. Howe was only 14 years old at the time of his heroic actions, making him one of the youngest persons to earn the Medal of Honor. On December 25, 1863, Howe reenlisted in the same regiment, being discharged as a corporal on November 30, 1864, and taking part in 14 battles.

A historian wrote of Howe: "We could see him nearly all the way . . . he ran through what seemed a hailstorm of canister and musket-balls, each throwing up its little puff of dust when it struck the dry hillside. Suddenly he dropped and hearts sank, but he had only tripped. Often he stumbled, sometimes he fell prostrate, but was quickly up again and he finally disappeared from us, limping over the summit and the 55th saw him no more for several months."

General Sherman wrote to Secretary of State Edwin M. Stanton about Howe, and for his bravery President Abraham Lincoln appointed him to the United States Naval Academy in July 1865 because he was too young for West Point. Howe resigned as a midshipman on June 15, 1867; he had been a member of the Class of 1870. He later graduated from the New York University dental school. Howe settled in Springfield, Missouri, where he died and was buried in the Springfield National Cemetery.

== Medal of Honor citation ==
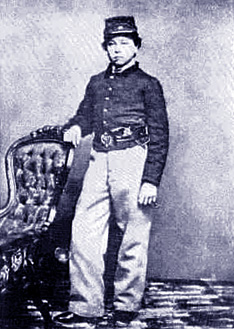
Orion P. Howe

Rank and organization: Musician, Company C, 55th Illinois Infantry. Place and date: At Vicksburg, Miss., May 19, 1863. Entered service at: Woken (should be - Waukegan), Ill. Birth: Portage County, Ohio.

Citation:

A drummer boy, 14 years of age, and severely wounded and exposed to a heavy fire from the enemy, he persistently remained upon the field of battle until he had reported to Gen. W. T. Sherman the necessity of supplying cartridges for the use of troops under command of Colonel Malmborg.

== Legacy ==
In 1982 the Waukegan, Illinois National Guard Armory was renamed in his honor. The 933rd Military Police Company currently drills there.

A statue of Howe is located in Veterans Memorial Plaza at Washington Park, just west of downtown Waukegan. It was dedicated in 2006 by the Waukegan Park District

== See also ==
- List of Medal of Honor recipients
- List of American Civil War Medal of Honor recipients: G–L
