= Fred Henry McGuire =

United States Navy Medal of Honor recipient

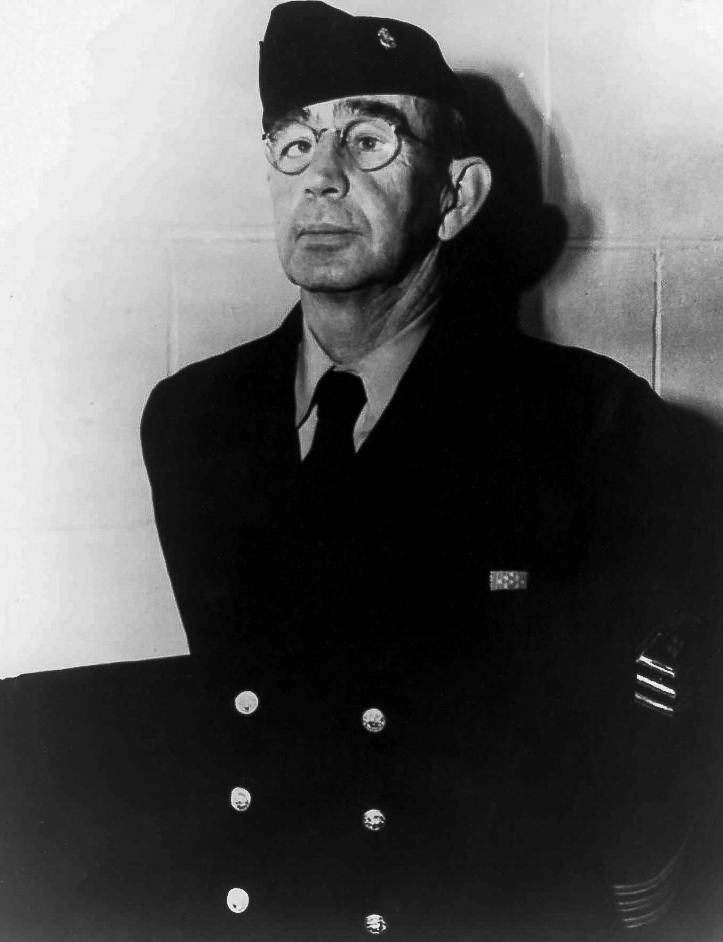
- Fred Henry McGuire
- Born: November 7, 1890; Gordonville, Missouri, US
- Died: February 4, 1958 (aged 67); Mountain Grove, Missouri, US
- Burial place: Springfield National Cemetery, Springfield, Missouri
- Military career
- Allegiance: United States
- Branch: United States Navy
- Rank: Chief Pharmacist's Mate
- Conflicts: Philippine–American War
- Awards: Medal of Honor

Fred Henry McGuire (November 7, 1890 – February 4, 1958) was a Chief Pharmacist Mate in the United States Navy and a Medal of Honor recipient for his role in the Philippine–American War.

== Biography ==
Fred joined the Navy at age 19 in 1909. Following basic training he was advanced to the Rank of Seaman, Hospital Apprentice and Chief Pharmacist's Mate. He was assigned to the gunboat U.S.S. Pampanga, a captured Spanish gunboat which was outfitted in 1899 as a U.S. Naval Vessel.

For a time the Pampanga served as a patrol boat in the service of the army, near Corregidor Island, but was returned to the Navy in late 1910. When the Pampanga was re-commissioned in April 1911, twenty year old Fred Henry McGuire was aboard, a member of a crew assigned to patrol duty off the coast of Basilan Island in the southern Philippines. Their assignment was to suppress a growing resistance to the American presence in the 7000 island Philippine archipelago.

In November 1939, McGuire retired from the Navy. During World War II, he was recalled to active duty and served in the Hospital Corps Division at Bureau of Medicine, Washington, D.C. In October 1945, he was again placed on the retired list.

He died February 4, 1958, and is buried in Springfield National Cemetery in Springfield, Missouri.

== Medal of Honor citation ==
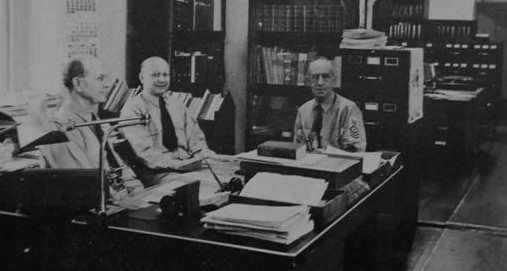
Chief Pharmacist Mate Fred Henry Mc Guire (picture right) circa 1940

Born: 7 November 1890, Gordonville, Missouri Entered service at: Gordonville, Mo. G.O. No.: 138, 13 December 1911.

Rank/Organization: Hospital Apprentice (Highest Rank: Chief Pharmacist)

Conflict: Action Against Outlaws, Philippines 1911

Unit/Command: U.S.S. Pampanga

Military Service Branch: U.S. Navy

Medal of Honor Action Date: September 23, 1911

Citation:

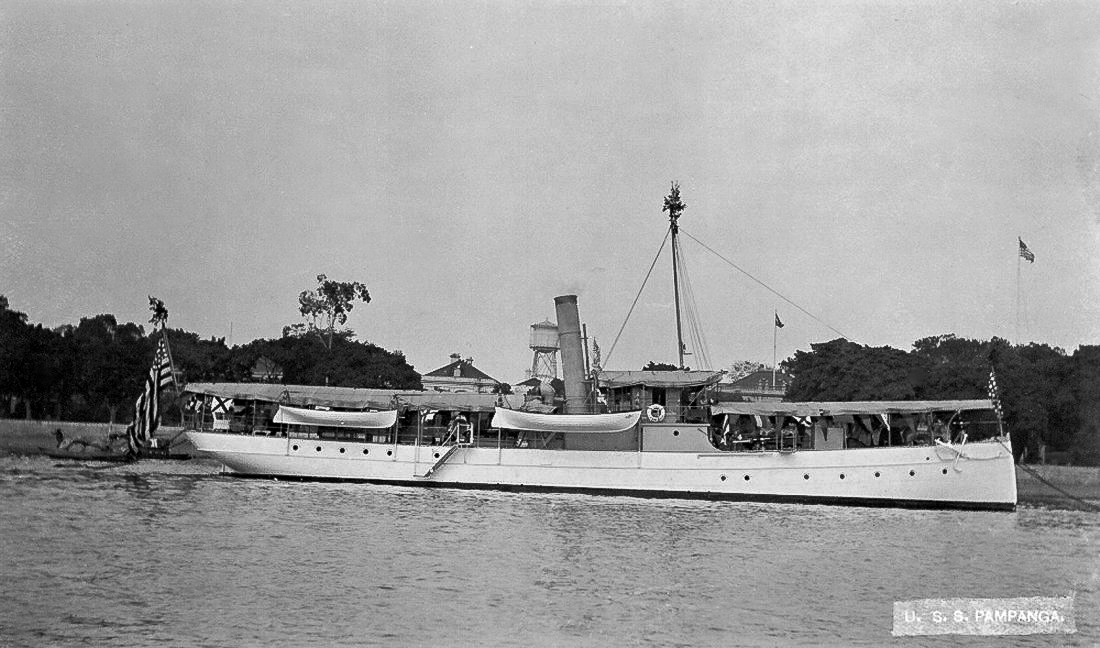
U.S.S. Pampanga

While attached to the U.S.S. Pampanga, McGuire was one of a shore party moving in to capture Mundang, on the island of Basilan, Philippine Islands, on the morning of 24 September 1911. Ordered to take station within 100 yards of a group of nipa huts close to the trail, McGuire advanced and stood guard as the leader and his scout party first searched the surrounding deep grasses, then moved into the open area before the huts. Instantly enemy Moros opened point-blank fire on the exposed men and approximately 20 Moros charged the small group from inside the huts and from other concealed positions. McGuire, responding to the calls for help, was one of the first on the scene. After emptying his rifle into the attackers, he closed in with rifle, using it as a club to wage fierce battle until his comrades arrived on the field, when he rallied to the aid of his dying leader and other wounded. Although himself wounded, McGuire ministered tirelessly and efficiently to those who had been struck down, thereby saving the lives of 2 who otherwise might have succumbed to enemy-inflicted wounds.

== See also ==
- List of Medal of Honor recipients
- List of Philippine–American War Medal of Honor recipients
- https://navylog.navymemorial.org/mcguire-fred
- https://www.krcu.org/2022-09-20/almost-yesterday-fred-mcguire-wins-congressional-medal-of-honor

== Sources ==
- ""FRED MCGUIRE" entry". Medal of Honor recipients: Action Against Philippine Outlaws - 1911. United States Army Center of Military History. June 8, 2009. Archived from the original on 2012-12-31.
- Almost Yesterday: Fred McGuire wins Congressional Medal of Honor: https://www.krcu.org/2022-09-20/almost-yesterday-fred-mcguire-wins-congressional-medal-of-honor
- https://navylog.navymemorial.org/mcguire-fred
- https://www.history.navy.mil/our-collections/photography/us-people/m/mcguire-fred-h.html
