= Sixtus O'Connor =

American priest and US Army chaplain

Sixtus O'Connor (March 15, 1909, Oxford, New York – July 10, 1983, Loudonville, New York) was an American priest and served as pastor during the Nuremberg Trials to Catholic prison inmates.

Richard James O'Connor was one of seven children of John O'Connor and Elizabeth Ann Cooke. He originally learned German from his mother. O'Connor attended St. Bonaventure College in Allegany, New York and on 19 August 1929 he entered the Franciscan Order in Patterson, New York, making his temporal vows in 1930 and his solemn vows in 1933.

He earned his bachelor's and master's degrees at St. Bonaventure University. On 12 June 1934 he was ordained a priest and took the name "Sixtus". From 1934, he also studied philosophy in Germany at the Universities of Munich and Bonn until the Second World War forced him to return to the US. From 1939 to 1943, he held a job as a special professor of philosophy at Siena College in Loudonville, New York.

In 1943, he was military chaplain for the 11th Armored Division of the 3rd Army under General George S. Patton. Later in the war, he served the 1st Infantry in the same function.

After the war, O'Connor was charged, together with the Lutheran minister Henry F. Gerecke, with the pastoral care of the prisoners of the Nuremberg War Crimes Trial, because he spoke fluent German from his years of study in Germany. Several prisoners under the influence of O'Connor returned to the Catholic faith, the most famous example being Hans Frank. On 16 October 1946, he assisted as chaplain at the execution of 10 war criminals, including Frank.

In his role as a prison chaplain, O'Connor was popular and willing to bend the rules for reasons including that of helping prisoners contact their families.

After serving the Nuremberg prisoners, O'Connor returned to St. Bonaventure College and taught philosophy and German there from 1947 to 1950. The following year, he was a guardian and taught philosophy at St. Stephen's, in Croghan, New York. From 1953, he was a professor at Siena College, in New York. There, he was from 1963 to 1964 chairman of the philosophy department and from 1956 to 1964 vice president of the college. He was vicar of the school's monastery.

In his religious life, he first bore the name Sixtus O'Connor (as during the Nuremberg Trials) and from 1968 onward that of Richard J. O'Connor. Between 1947 and 1950, while teaching at St. Bonaventure College, O'Connor authored a paper titled Giants die at Nurnberg discussing his time from September, 1945 to December, 1946, serving as a prison chaplain. The five-page paper primarily focuses on the events of 15 and 16 October 1945 and the executions of the defendants condemned to death. O'Connor noted that Army Chaplains were told to remain with the bodies to read a burial service. During this time, the undertaker showed O'Connor and Gerecke where Goering's body had a small opening from a prior surgery next to his navel and the vial of cyanide had been concealed and then removed by Goering in order to commit suicide.

O'Connor died on 10 July 1983, aged 74. He was buried at St. Agnes Cemetery, in Menands, New York.

== Memberships ==
- Catholic Philosophy Association
- Society of Medieval and Renaissance Philosophy
- ROTC (Reserve Officer Training Corps) Scholarship Committee

== Sources ==
1. Obituary, hnp.org; accessed August 27, 2016.
2. ↑ For the U.S. side: Prison Commandant Burten C. Andrus cited in: William J. Hourihan: U.S. Army Chaplain Ministry to German War Criminals at Nuremberg, 1945–1946. Online, pg. 6 (PDF; 151 kB)
3. ↑ For the German side: Prison inmate F.X. Schwarz (former Nazi treasurer), cited in John E. Dolibois: Pattern of Circles: An Ambassador's Story. p. 167.
