= Harrison Collins =

Medal of Honor recipient

- Born: March 10, 1836; Hawkins County, Tennessee, US
- Died: December 25, 1890 (aged 54); Isabella, Missouri, US
- Burial place: Springfield National Cemetery, Springfield, Missouri
- Military career
- Allegiance: United States
- Branch: United States Army; Union Army
- Rank: Sergeant
- Unit: 1st Regiment, Tennessee Volunteer Cavalry
- Conflicts: Battle of Nashville
- Awards: Medal of Honor

Harrison Collins (March 10, 1836 – December 25, 1890) was an American soldier who received the Medal of Honor for valor during the American Civil War.

== Biography ==
Harrison Carl Collins was born on March 10, 1836, in Hawkins County, Tennessee, before it became Hancock County. Hancock County was created from parts of Hawkins and Claiborne counties in 1844.

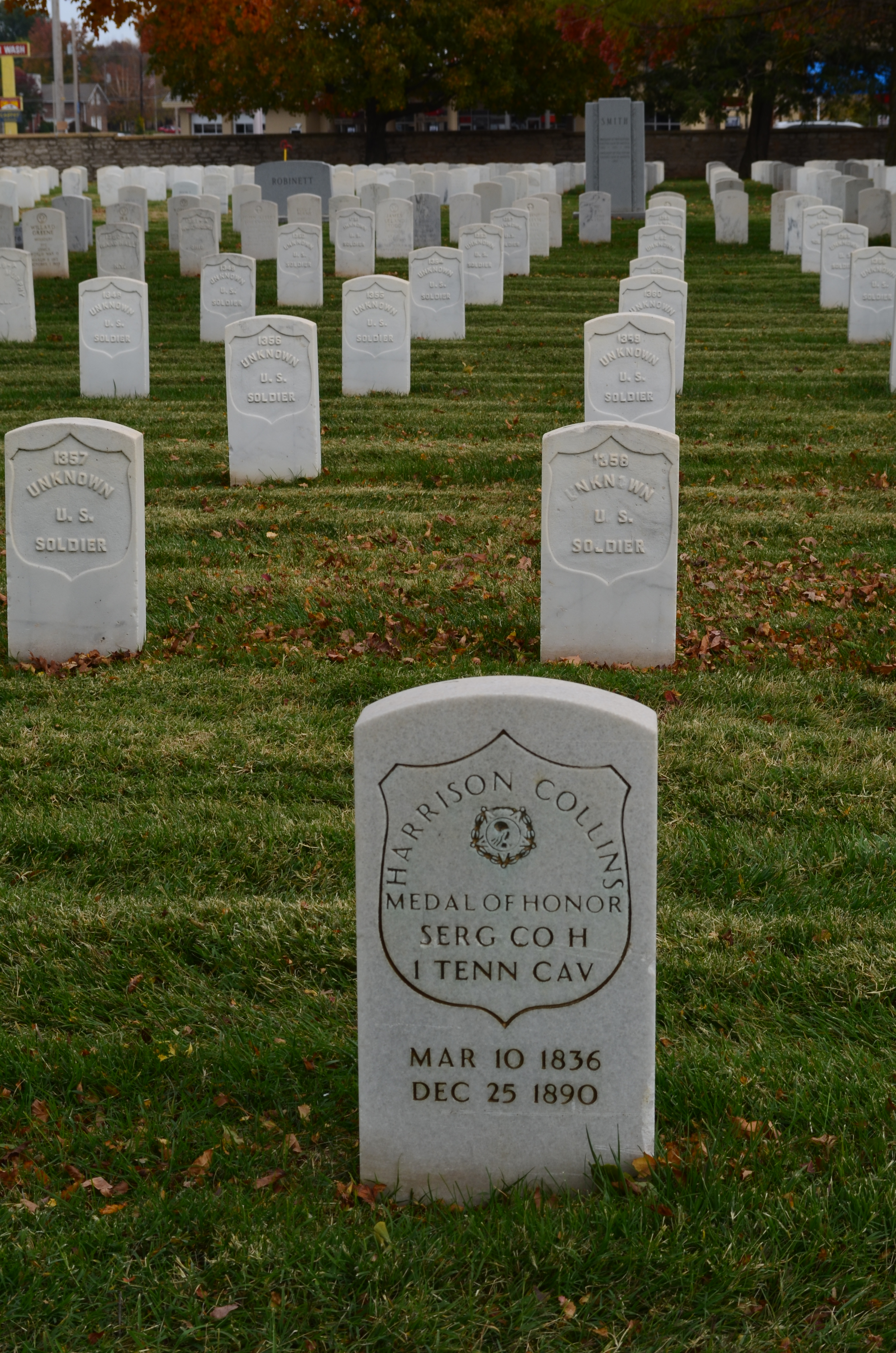

Collins served in the American Civil War in the 1st Tennessee Volunteer Cavalry for the Union Army. He enlisted as a private in Company A of the 1st Tennessee Cavalry (USA) on March 9, 1862. He served in the Federal army just over three years, being discharged in June 1865.

After the war, Harrison moved back to his home on Newmans' Ridge in Hancock County. Soon after, he moved his family to Isabella, Missouri, in the Ozark Mountains, where he lived the rest of his life. Harrison died on Christmas Day of 1890 in Isabella, Missouri.

In 1996, his remains were recovered from an unmarked gravesite and were re-interred with full military honors at the Springfield National Cemetery in Springfield, Missouri.

== Medal of Honor citation ==
Citation: During the Civil War, three soldiers from the state of Tennessee were awarded the Congressional Medal of Honor. As a Corporal, Harrison Collins was the first Tennessean to receive that honor. He received the award on 24 February 1865 for his heroic actions following the Battle of Nashville. The Battle of Nashville is considered one of the most decisive battles of the Civil War; decisive because it ended the last major Confederate offensive in the Western Theater, and decisive because it was an undisputed victory for the Union

Capture of flag of Chalmer's Division (C.S.A.).

On Christmas Eve of 1864, at the Battle of Richland Creek, Corporal Harrison Collins observed a Confederate Major attempting to rally his troops around the Divisional banner of Brigadier General James R. Chalmers. Cpl Collins led a charge to capture the flag and disrupt the enemy's rally. He was successful in capturing the headquarters standard of General Chalmer’s C.S.A. Division, and the Federal forces chased the retreating army all the way to the Tennessee River.

- Brigadier General John T. Croxton, Collins's commanding officer, wrote a letter confirming the event to the cavalry corps' Chief of Staff.
- Croxton described Collins's determination: "He determined to have the flag; led a charge, killed the major, routed his men, and secured the flag".

== See also ==
- List of American Civil War Medal of Honor recipients: A-F
