= Gordonville, Missouri =

- Village
- Nickname: Mayor Jason Crombie
- Location of Gordonville, Missouri
- Coordinates: 37°18′40″N 89°40′26″W
- Country: United States
- State: Missouri
- County: Cape Girardeau

Area
  - Total: 0.78 sq mi (2.02 km^{2})
  - Land: 0.78 sq mi (2.02 km^{2})
  - Water: 0 sq mi (0.00 km^{2})
- Elevation: 404 ft (123 m)

Population (2020)
  - Total: 625
  - Density: 801.0/sq mi (309.26/km^{2})
- Time zone: UTC-6 (Central (CST))
  - Summer (DST): UTC-5 (CDT)
- ZIP codes: 63701, 63752
- Area code: 573
- FIPS code: 29-27928
- GNIS feature ID: 2398180

Gordonville is a village in Cape Giradeau County, Missouri, United States. The population was 625 at the 2020 census. It is part of the Cape Girardeau–Jackson, MO-IL Metropolitan Statistical Area.

== Etymology ==
Gordonville was named after Sam Gordon, who established a watermill on the same site where the Gordonville Milling Company operated.

== History ==
The land around present-day Gordonville was originally owned by Sam Gordon and his father, who lived in Indiana. Sam Gordon established the first store in the town in either 1857 or 1858, and the town became known as Gordonville. The first church in the town was set up by Methodist missionaries on the farm of Louis Siemers in 1848, with Liberty School house being established shortly later. Hubble Mill and Gordonville Roller Mills were established along Hubble Creek.

In the 1850s, German immigrants began to move into the area and established farms around Gordonville. A German Methodist church and a German Lutheran church were also organized just south of Gordonville to serve the local German population.

In 2020, Libertarian candidate Jason M Crombie was unanimously voted in as mayor of Gordonville by a vote of 99-1. In 2023 Mr. Crombie petitioned the village board of trustee's to rename the town Ville De Gordon, however it was voted down.

== Geography ==
Gordonville is located along Hubble Creek at 37°18′44″N 89°40′27″W (37.312237, -89.674245).

According to the United States Census Bureau, the village has a total area of 0.78 square miles (2.02 km^{2}), all land.

== Demographics ==
Historical population
Census	Pop.	Note	%±
1880	81		—
1890	95		17.3%
1900	125		31.6%
1910	170		36.0%
1920	150		−11.8%
1930	129		−14.0%
1940	154		19.4%
1950	130		−15.6%
1960	92		−29.2%
1970	125		35.9%
1980	267		113.6%
1990	345		29.2%
2000	425		23.2%
2010	391		−8.0%
2020	625		59.8%
U.S. Decennial Census 2020

=== 2010 census ===
As of the census of 2010, there were 391 people, 157 households, and 124 families living in the village. The population density was 501.3 inhabitants per square mile (193.6/km^{2}). There were 167 housing units at an average density of 214.1 per square mile (82.7/km^{2}). The racial makeup of the village was 99.23% White, 0.26% Black or African American, and 0.51% from two or more races. Hispanic or Latino of any race were 0.51% of the population.

There were 157 households, of which 28.7% had children under the age of 18 living with them, 72.6% were married couples living together, 3.8% had a female householder with no husband present, 2.5% had a male householder with no wife present, and 21.0% were non-families. 19.7% of all households were made up of individuals, and 8.3% had someone living alone who was 65 years of age or older. The average household size was 2.48 and the average family size was 2.81.

The median age in the village was 46.5 years. 17.4% of residents were under the age of 18; 8% were between the ages of 18 and 24; 21.7% were from 25 to 44; 36% were from 45 to 64; and 16.9% were 65 years of age or older. The gender makeup of the village was 49.1% male and 50.9% female.

=== 2000 census ===
As of the census of 2000, there were 425 people, 154 households, and 129 families living in the village. The population density was 527.1 inhabitants per square mile (203.5/km^{2}). There were 158 housing units at an average density of 196.0 per square mile (75.7/km^{2}). The racial makeup of the village was 98.59% White, 0.94% Native American, and 0.47% from two or more races. Hispanic or Latino of any race were 0.24% of the population.

There were 154 households, out of which 39.6% had children under the age of 18 living with them, 77.9% were married couples living together, 4.5% had a female householder with no husband present, and 15.6% were non-families. 13.6% of all households were made up of individuals, and 8.4% had someone living alone who was 65 years of age or older. The average household size was 2.76 and the average family size was 3.03.

In the village, the population was spread out, with 27.1% under the age of 18, 6.8% from 18 to 24, 27.3% from 25 to 44, 24.9% from 45 to 64, and 13.9% who were 65 years of age or older. The median age was 40 years. For every 100 females, there were 88.1 males. For every 100 females age 18 and over, there were 92.5 males.

The median income for a household in the village was $53,125, and the median income for a family was $57,375. Males had a median income of $35,341 versus $17,917 for females. The per capita income for the village was $20,763. About 1.6% of families and 3.9% of the population were below the poverty line, including 6.8% of those under age 18 and 3.6% of those age 65 or over.

== Education ==
It is in the Jackson R-2 School District, which operates Jackson High School.

== Notable people ==
- Henry F. Gerecke, Lutheran minister and United States Army chaplain
- Fred Henry McGuire, United States Navy sailor and receipt of the Medal of Honor
