= USS Robert G. Bradley =

1983 Oliver Hazard Perry-class frigate

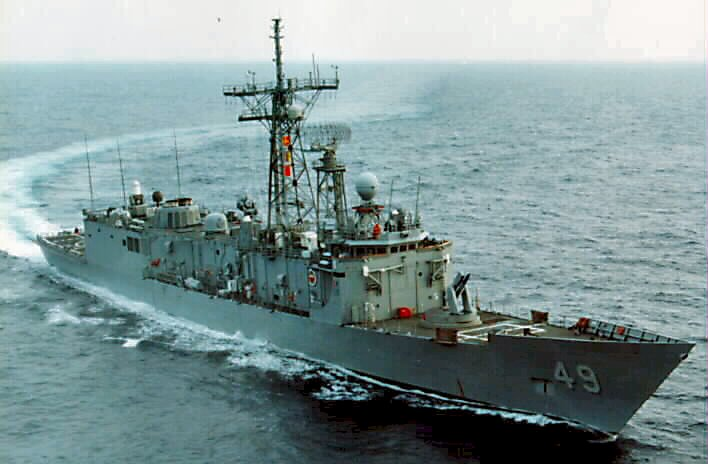
- USS Robert G. Bradley (FFG-49) c. 1980s

History

United States
- Namesake: Lieutenant Robert G. Bradley
- Awarded: 28 April 1980
- Builder: Bath Iron Works, Bath, Maine
- Laid down: 28 December 1982
- Launched: 13 August 1983
- Sponsored by: Mrs. Edna D. Woodruff
- Commissioned: 30 June 1984
- Decommissioned: 28 March 2014
- Home port: Mayport, Florida
- Identification: MMSI number: 338801000; Callsign: NRGB
- Fate: Transferred to Royal Bahrain Naval Force
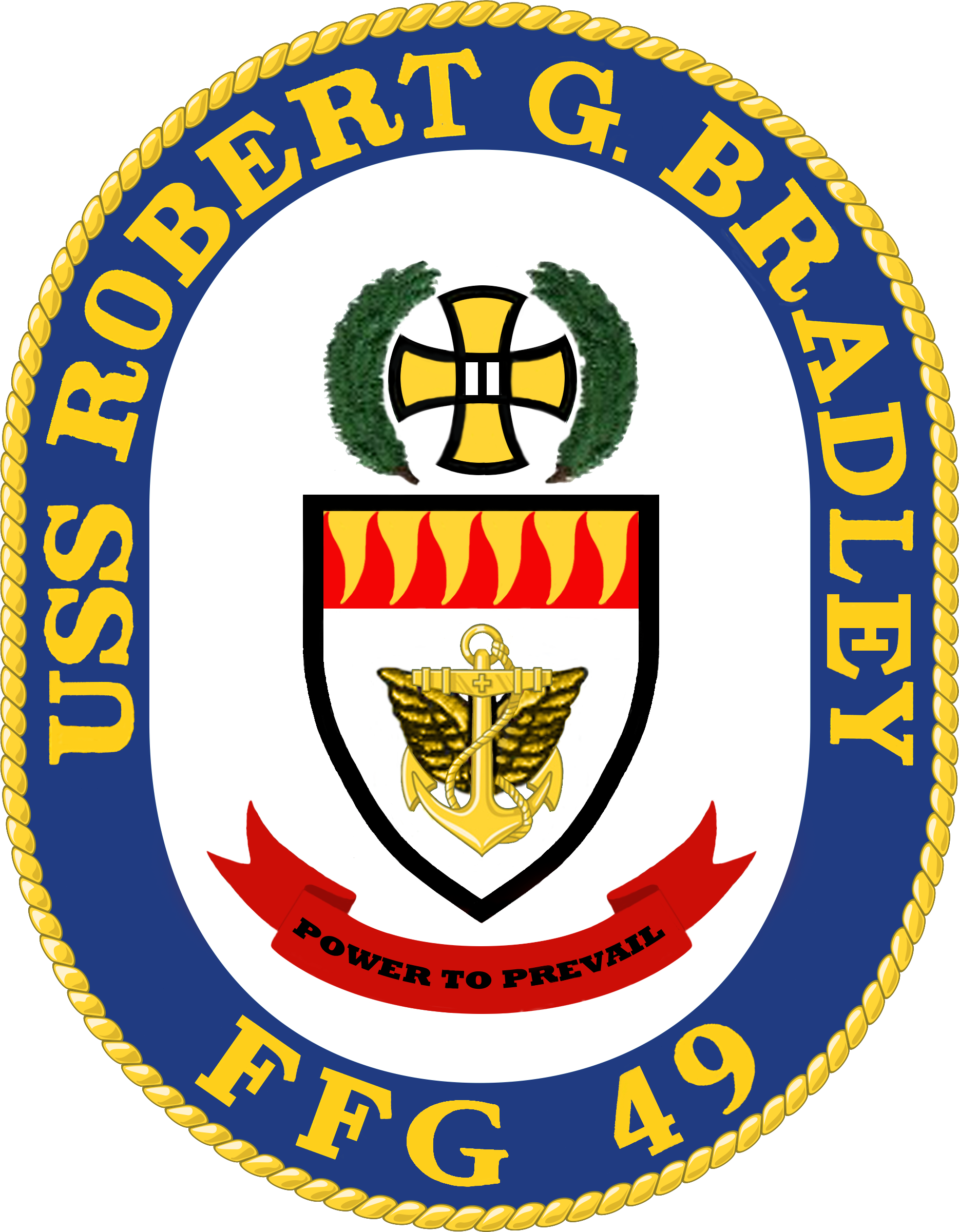
- Badge

Bahrain
- Name: RBNS Khalid bin Ali (91); (خالد بن علي)
- Namesake: Shaikh Khalid bin Ali Al Khalifa
- Commissioned: 4 February 2024
- Status: In service

General characteristics
- Class & type: Oliver Hazard Perry-class frigate
- Displacement: 4,100 long tons (4,200 t), full load
- Length: 453 feet (138 m), overall
- Beam: 45 feet (14 m)
- Draught: 22 feet (6.7 m)
- Propulsion: 2 × General Electric LM2500-30 gas turbines generating 41,000 shp (31 MW) through a single shaft and variable pitch propeller; 2 × Auxiliary Propulsion Units, 350 hp (260 kW) retractable electric azimuth thrusters for maneuvering and docking.
- Speed: over 29 knots (54 km/h)
- Range: 5,000 nautical miles at 18 knots (9,300 km at 33 km/h)
- Complement: 15 officers and 190 enlisted, plus SH-60 LAMPS detachment of roughly six officer pilots and 15 enlisted maintainers
- Sensors & processing systems: AN/SPS-49 air-search radar; AN/SPS-55 surface-search radar; CAS and STIR fire-control radar; AN/SQS-56 sonar.
- Electronic warfare & decoys: AN/SLQ-32
- Armament: As built: 1 × OTO Melara Mk 75 76 mm/62 caliber naval gun; 2 × Mk 32 triple-tube (324 mm) launchers for Mark 46 torpedoes; 1 × Vulcan Phalanx CIWS; 4 × .50-cal (12.7 mm) machine guns.; 1 × Mk 13 Mod 4 single-arm launcher for Harpoon anti-ship missiles and SM-1MR Standard anti-ship/air missiles (40 round magazine); Note: As of 2004, Mk 13 systems removed from all active US vessels of this class.
- Aircraft carried: 2 × SH-60 LAMPS III helicopters

USS Robert G. Bradley (FFG-49) is an Oliver Hazard Perry-class frigate, serving in the Bahrain Navy. This ship of was named for Lieutenant Robert G. Bradley (1921–1944), who was awarded the Navy Cross posthumously for his heroism on USS Princeton during the Battle of Leyte Gulf.

Robert G. Bradley entered service on 30 June 1984. The ship was homeported in Mayport, Florida. She was decommissioned in Mayport on 28 March 2014 and entered service with the Royal Bahrain Naval Force as RBNS Khalid bin Ali (91).

== Namesake ==
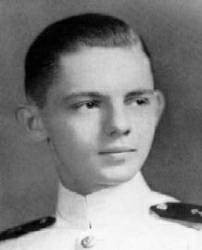
Robert G. Bradley

Robert Graham Bradley was born in Washington, D.C., on 26 September 1921. He was appointed to the United States Naval Academy on 9 June 1939, and graduated on 19 June 1942. He completed instruction at the Atlantic Subordinate Command, Service Force, Norfolk, Va. (3 July – 27 October 1942), and on 29 October reported to New York Shipbuilding Corporation, Camden, New Jersey, for the fitting out of light aircraft carrier USS Princeton (CVL-23). He served as a member of the ship's company when Princeton was commissioned on 25 February 1943, and while on board received promotions to lieutenant, junior grade and lieutenant (1 May 1943 and 1 July 1944, respectively), as she took part in operations ranging from the occupation of Baker Island (September 1943) to the Battle of Leyte Gulf (October 1944).

On 24 October 1944 while Princeton steamed with Task Group 38.3 (part of Task Force 38) in Leyte Gulf off the east coast of Luzon, Philippines, a Japanese plane, tentatively identified as a Yokosuka D4Y1 Type 2 [Judy], attacked the ship. Its bomb penetrated the flight, hangar, and main decks and exploded, igniting an inferno that swept across the hangar deck. Explosions rocked the carrier, but Bradley, the ship's assistant first lieutenant, led a repair party and battled the blaze on the second and third decks. The intense heat compelled Bradley and his men to abandon their efforts, and after verifying that no wounded men remained behind, he entered the water at 10:05, rescued soon thereafter by Morrison. Their success in fighting the fire led many of the men to believe that if they could clear the smoke from Princeton's largely undamaged machinery spaces, they could raise steam and save the ship. At 13:00 Bradley returned to Princeton from Morrison — which lay alongside Princeton's starboard quarter to play her hoses onto the flames and became temporarily wedged between two of the carrier's overhanging stacks. A submarine and air alert sounded 30 minutes later and Birmingham and Morrison, the two closest ships, pulled away from Princeton to take their antisubmarine stations. The determined firefighting efforts had nearly controlled the fire, but it raged again during the ensuing lull. Following the alert, Birmingham and Morrison closed and attempted to secure a line to Princeton. At 15:15 the cruiser succeeded on its third try, but at 15:23 the flames touched off four hundred 100-pound bombs stowed aft in the torpedo magazine. The resulting explosion blew off the upper part of the carrier's stern, killing Bradley and every man in the vicinity.

Bradley had repeatedly risked his life, entering the most dangerous areas below deck to ascertain the extent of the damage and to fight the fires blazing on board. For his "outstanding fortitude, great personal valor, and self-sacrificing devotion to the completion of an extremely perilous task," as well as his "extraordinary heroism," Bradley received the Navy Cross posthumously. Bradley's name appears on the Tablets of the Missing, Manila American Cemetery, Manila, Philippines.

== Service history ==
Robert G. Bradley was laid down on 28 December 1982 at Bath, Maine, by Bath Iron Works Corp. and launched on 13 August 1983; sponsored by Mrs. Edna D. Woodruff, Bradley's mother; and commissioned on 30 June 1984.

Robert G. Bradley deployed to the Mediterranean (18 August 1986 – 7 March 1987; 4 November 1994 – 15 April 1995; and 28 June–21 December 1996); the Mediterranean and North Atlantic (5 January–2 July 1998); and the Middle East Force (Horn of Africa, Persian Gulf, 28 April–28 October 1988). In addition, she made multiple law enforcement and counter-narcotics deployments to the Caribbean and eastern Pacific, and carried out a number of specialized operations in North American, Latin American, and European waters. The ship also took part in Operation Support Democracy: a UN attempt to restore order in Haiti (September–October 1993). Robert G. Bradley operated off Haiti's northern coast, tracking an average of more than 150 ships per day. During the ship's deployments, she normally embarked one or two Sikorsky SH-60B Seahawks of Helicopter Antisubmarine Squadrons (Light) (HSL) 42, 46, or 48.

Robert G. Bradley intercepted fishing vessel Recuerdo, smuggling 9.2 short tons (8.3 t) of cocaine, in the eastern Pacific (3 August 2001). She subsequently turned over the suspects and their illicit cargo to U.S. and Panamanian law enforcement authorities. Robert G. Bradley then intercepted a go fast carrying 1.2 short tons (1.1 t) of cocaine (3 September). The ship sank the go fast, and turned over the narcotics and the four smugglers to coastal patrol ship Hurricane (PC-3), which transferred them to U.S. law enforcement authorities. In company with destroyer David R. Ray, Robert G. Bradley monitored and boarded fishing vessel Lilliana 1, took the boat under tow when she developed engine trouble, and brought her 13 crewmembers ashore (24 September–5 October).

Robert G. Bradley's (2 June–2 September 2003) counter-narcotics deployment to the Caribbean and eastern Pacific proved especially eventful. The ship operated as the on-scene commander for the search and rescue of fishing vessel Fufu Chen and her nine crewmembers off the Costa Rican coast (17–19 July). Fishing boat Costa del Sol transferred three survivors for treatment to Robert G. Bradley, and fishing vessel Arelis transferred a fourth person. The ship then shifted the survivors to the Costa Rican Coast Guard. Guided missile frigate Rentz transferred 19 narcotics smugglers she had apprehended to Robert G. Bradley in Panamanian waters, which then turned them over to the U.S. Drug Enforcement Administration (8–13 August).

The ship next intercepted and boarded fishing vessel Llanero, which flew the Nicaraguan flag without proper documentation (26–27 August). Her boarding team discovered 1.85 short tons (1.68 t) of cocaine hidden in the hold, and apprehended eight smugglers. The inspectors determined that Llanero was unfit for the sea and sank her with GAU-16 fire from Cutlass 472, her embarked Seahawk, and 76 and 25 millimeter gunfire, 40 millimeter grenades, and .50 caliber fire from the ship (6°29′4″N 83°12′6″W). Robert G. Bradley and a U.S. Coast Guard Lockheed HC-130H "Hercules" chased a go fast that escaped into Colombian waters and beached herself on the Island de Providencia (30 August). The smugglers fled, but Colombian Coast Guardsmen recovered 1.3 short tons (1.2 t) of cocaine.

Robert G. Bradley was decommissioned on 28 March 2014. In 2022, she was taken out of Philiadelphia to be transferred to the Bahrain Navy. On 4 February 2024, this ship, as RBNS Khalid bin Ali, was commissioned into the Bahraini Navy.
