= Henry F. Gerecke =

American pastor

Reverend Henry Fred Gerecke
- Church: Lutheran Church–Missouri Synod

Orders
- Ordination: 24 January 1926 by Rev. A. P. Feddersen

Personal details
- Born: August 4, 1893 Gordonville, Missouri
- Died: October 11, 1961 (aged 68) Chester, Illinois
- Buried: Saint John Evangelical Lutheran Cemetery, Chester, Illinois
- Denomination: Lutheran Church–Missouri Synod
- Parents: Herman and Caroline Gerecke
- Spouse: Alma Gerecke (née Bender)
- Military career
- Branch: United States Army
- Service years: 1943–1949
- Rank: Major
- Conflicts: World War II
- Children: 3
- Education: St. John's Academy and College

Reverend Henry Fred Gerecke (/gɛrəki/; August 4, 1893 – October 11, 1961) was a Lutheran minister who worked as a pastor, evangelist, prison chaplain, and US Army hospital chaplain. He is most well known for his work as a chaplain during the Nuremberg Trials following the end of the Second World War, when he ministered to leading figures of the German Nazi Party who were on trial for war crimes.

== Personal life ==
Henry Gerecke was born in 1893 in Gordonville, Missouri. His mother Caroline "Lena" Gerecke (née Kelpe) was originally from Hanover, Germany and his father Herman Gerecke was an American farmer of German descent. Gerecke helped his father on the family farm in his youth as a farm labourer and when aged fourteen he heard Billy Sunday preach, the influential baseball player turned evangelist who inspired the young Henry Gerecke to pursue a calling in Christian ministry. Herman disapproved of such a career and instead encouraged his son to become either a farmer (in the family tradition) or a teacher. Despite this, after some more years on the family farm Henry Gerecke started a ministerial course aged twenty, at St. John's Academy and College, in Winfield, Kansas. College degree in hand, Gerecke could then move on to the Lutheran Concordia Seminary in St. Louis, the city where he also met his future wife Alma Bender, who he married on 23 July 1919. Gerecke was forced to leave the Concordia Seminary since it disapproved of students getting engaged or married during their studies. However, Gerecke was permitted to continue his studies privately, and he also worked in a teaching capacity at Emmaus Lutheran. With the support and tutelage of individual professors he graduated from Concordia in 1925 and was ordained as a Lutheran minister in January 1926.

Henry and Alma Gerecke had three children: Henry (known as Hank), Carlton (known as Corky), and Roy.

== Prewar ministry ==
After his ordination in 1926, Henry Gerecke remained in St. Louis, where he became the pastor of Christ Lutheran Church, the same church in which he had been ordained. Gerecke remained ministering to his parish as the Great Depression began to bite in the 1930s but by 1935 he felt called to missionary work and left Christ Lutheran Church in 1935 to pursue a very different kind of Christian ministry. Rev. Gerecke joined the St. Louis Lutheran City Mission and became both its "executive missioner" and pastor of the Good Shepherd Lutheran Church in the North of the city which was owned by City Mission. While working there, Gerecke founded a new arm of City Mission, known as Lutheran Mission Industries which established two charity shops and provided work for the unemployed during the difficult times of the Great Depression and simultaneously provided affordable second-hand goods to those in need. Alongside this, Gerecke began ministering at local prisons and local hospitals where he both ministered to individuals and led services, alongside his ongoing commitment to The Good Shepherd.

Not content with ministering to the people of St. Louis only in person, Gerecke also took to the airwaves, with his regular radio program Moments of Comfort which aired hymns, prayers, and Gerecke's own sermons.

== World War II ==
Late in 1940, Henry Gerecke's son Hank enlisted in the US Army. Just a year later in December 1941, Japan attacked Pearl Harbor and the United States joined the Second World War to fight alongside Britain and the other allied forces against the axis powers. Corky followed his older brother's example by joining the army in September 1942 while Henry Gerecke continued his work at City Mission. In June 1943 Henry Gerecke followed his sons to war and volunteered as an army chaplain. By August, Gerecke was already underway with his month of training at the Chaplain School at Harvard University following which he was promptly deployed to Hermitage in Southern England with the US Army's Ninety-Eighth General Hospital, a hospital that received injured soldiers from the front-lines of the Western Front. After VE Day, the Ninety-Eighth was no longer required in England and so, along with Gerecke as their chaplain, went to Munich, Germany, to re-establish a damaged hospital in the wartorn German city.

== Nuremberg Trials ==
The leading Nazi Party leaders who were still alive stood trial after the war in the Nuremberg trials. The commandant of the Nuremberg Prison, where the defendants were detained, Colonel Burton Andrus personally requested for Gerecke to be assigned there as chaplain. Gerecke became the Protestant chaplain, and Father Sixtus O'Connor was the Roman Catholic chaplain. Reasons for his appointment include the facts that the Lutheran Church was the largest Protestant denomination in Germany, Gerecke was a Lutheran minister, his prior prison chaplaincy experience suited him to the role and he had studied German at St John's.

Gerecke's role was to minister to the defendants but also to members of the International Military Tribunal staff working in the trials. Gerecke ministered to fifteen of the defendants who preferred a Protestant minister, and O'Connor ministered to the six who preferred a Catholic chaplain.

While the defendants stood trial, Gerecke was keen to lead them back to Christ as well as to offer them communion if he felt they were ready to do so. Fritz Sauckel, (the Nazi labor leader) eventually took communion during the trial, as did Albert Speer (Minister of Armaments and War Production), Hans Fritzsche (a Nazi propagandist) and Baldur von Schirach (Reichsleiter for Youth Education). After their convictions, Joachim von Ribbentrop (foreign minister), Wilhelm Keitel (the Wehrmacht field marshal) all also took communion with Gerecke before their executions.

A fortnight after the executions of the convicted war criminals who had been hanged at the gallows, Gerecke returned to the US.

== After Nuremberg ==
Gerecke moved to Milwaukee, Wisconsin, after the trials and worked as chaplain at the disciplinary barracks there. Henry and Alma Gerecke left for Chicago, Illinois, in 1949 where he briefly served at Fifth Army Headquarters. Then he left active military service and became assistant pastor at St. John Lutheran Church in Chester, Illinois. There, Gerecke also ministered to the local Chester hospital and Menard penitentiary. While parking his car at Menard Penitentiary in 1961, Gerecke suffered a heart attack and died later that morning. A thousand people visited his body as it lay in state in St. John's and a further eight-hundred prisoners paid their respects when his body lay in the Menard penitentiary chapel. Gerecke's body is buried at St. John's Cemetery in Chester.
