= Patrick H. Pentzer =

Patrick Henry Pentzer
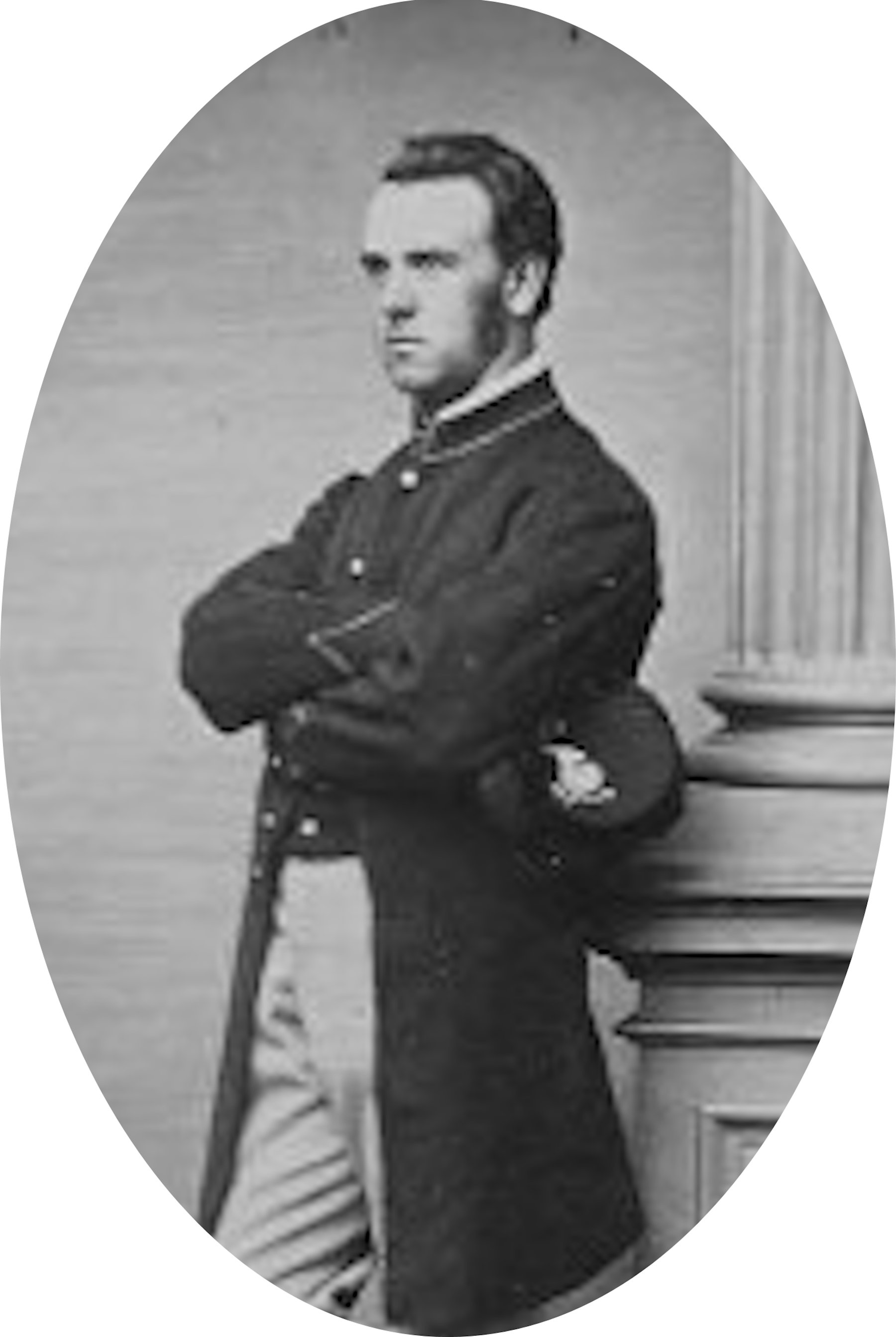
- Born: 1839; Marion County, Missouri
- Died: October 16, 1901 (aged 61–62)
- Burial place: Springfield National Cemetery
- Military career
- Allegiance: United States of America
- Branch: United States Army
- Rank: Captain
- Unit: Company C 97th Illinois Infantry Regiment
- Conflicts: Battle of Fort Blakeley; American Civil War
- Awards: Medal of Honor

Patrick H. Pentzer (1839 – October 16, 1901) was an American soldier who fought with the Union Army in the American Civil War. Pentzer received his country's highest award for bravery during combat, the Medal of Honor, for actions taken on April 9, 1865, during the Battle of Fort Blakeley.

== Biography ==
Pentzer was born in 1839 in Marion County, Missouri, but lived most of his life in Illinois. During the Civil War, Pentzel enlisted at Gillespie, Macoupin County, Illinois. He initially served as a private in Company H of the 9th Illinois Infantry, then re-enlisted as sergeant-major of the 97th Illinois Infantry Regiment where he served three years.

On February 14, 1863, he was promoted to a Captain the 97th regiment. During the Battle of Fort Blakeley, Pentzel captured the enemy colors and surrender of Confederate General Francis Cockrell which earned him the Medal of Honor.

== Medal of Honor citation ==
The President of the United States of America, in the name of Congress, takes pleasure in presenting the Medal of Honor to Captain (Infantry) Patrick Henry Pentzer, United States Army, for extraordinary heroism on 9 April 1865, while serving with Company C, 97th Illinois Infantry, in action at Fort Blakeley, Alabama. Among the first to enter the enemy's entrenchments, Captain Pentzer received the surrender of a Confederate general officer and his headquarters flag.

== Personal life ==
Pentzer married his wife, Mary, on June 19, 1870. He died on October 16, 1901, and was interred in Springfield National Cemetery.
