= Jack Williams (Medal of Honor) =

United States Navy Medal of Honor recipient (1924–1945)

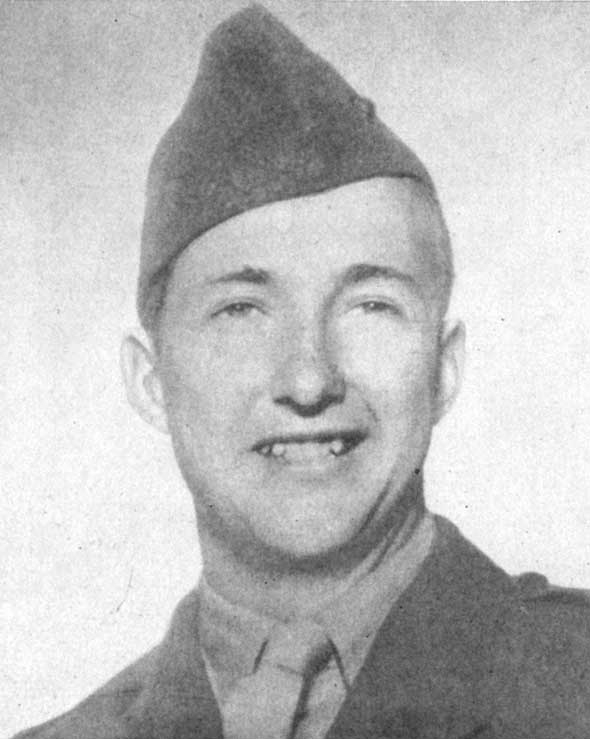
- PhM3c Jack Williams, U.S. Navy Reserve; Medal of Honor recipient
- Born: October 18, 1924; Harrison, Arkansas
- Died: March 3, 1945 (aged 20); Iwo Jima, Bonin Islands, Japanese Empire
- Burial place: Springfield National Cemetery, Springfield, Missouri
- Military career
- Allegiance: United States of America
- Branch: United States Navy
- Service years: 1943–1945
- Rank: Pharmacist's Mate Third Class
- Units: 3rd Battalion, 28th Marine Regiment
- Conflicts: World War II; Battle of Iwo Jima †
- Awards: Medal of Honor; Purple Heart Medal (2)

Jack Williams (October 18, 1924 – March 3, 1945) was a United States Navy hospital corpsman who was killed in action while serving with a Marine Corps infantry unit in World War II. He was posthumously awarded the nation's highest military decoration for valor, the Medal of Honor, for heroic actions "above and beyond the call of duty" on March 3, 1945, during the Battle of Iwo Jima.

== U.S. Navy Reserve ==
=== World War II ===
Williams enlisted as an Apprentice Seaman in the United States Naval Reserve from his birth state of Arkansas in June 1943. He received recruit training at Naval Training Station, San Diego, California and was promoted to seaman second class in July 1943. Williams completed Naval Hospital Corps School training at Naval Hospital, San Diego, California and his rating was changed to hospital apprentice that September. In November, he was promoted to hospital apprentice first class. In January 1944, Williams received orders to the Fleet Marine Force (FMF), Field Medical School Battalion, Camp Elliott, San Diego, for combat field training, and transferred a few months later to Headquarters, 5th Marine Division at Camp Pendleton, California. In May 1944, Williams was promoted to pharmacist's mate, third class.

On February 19, 1945, he landed on Iwo Jima with the 3rd Battalion, 28th Marine Regiment, 5th Marine Division. On March 3, when a Marine, James Naughton, was wounded forward of the front lines, Williams went to assist him and was hit by enemy fire. Williams completed his mission of mercy, dressed his own wounds, and rendered aid to another fallen Marine. On his way back to the rear, Williams was hit by an enemy sniper and died later that day. For his actions on that day, he was posthumously awarded the Medal of Honor.

Williams, aged 20 at his death, was buried in Springfield National Cemetery, Springfield, Missouri.

== Military awards ==
Williams' military awards and decorations include:

	Medal of Honor	
Purple Heart Medal	Navy Presidential Unit Citation	Navy Unit Commendation
American Campaign Medal	Asiatic-Pacific Campaign Medal w/ one 3/16" bronze star	World War II Victory Medal

=== Medal of Honor citation ===
Pharmacist's Mate Williams' official Medal of Honor citation reads:

The President of the United States in the name of The Congress takes pride in presenting the MEDAL OF HONOR posthumously to PHARMACIST MATE THIRD CLASS JACK WILLIAMS
UNITED STATES NAVY RESERVE for service as set forth in the following

CITATION:

For conspicuous gallantry and intrepidity at the risk of his life above and beyond the call of duty while serving with the 3rd Battalion 28th Marines, 5th Marine Division, during the occupation of Iwo Jima Volcano Islands, March 3, 1945. Gallantly going forward on the frontlines under intense enemy small-arms fire to assist a marine wounded in a fierce grenade battle, Williams dragged the man to a shallow depression and was kneeling, using his own body as a screen from the sustained fire as he administered first aid, when struck in the abdomen and groin 3 times by hostile rifle fire. Momentarily stunned, he quickly recovered and completed his ministration before applying battle dressings to his own multiple wounds. Unmindful of his own urgent need for medical attention, he remained in the perilous fire-swept area to care for another marine casualty. Heroically completing his task despite pain and profuse bleeding, he then endeavored to make his way to the rear in search of adequate aid for himself when struck down by a Japanese sniper bullet which caused his collapse. Succumbing later as a result of his self-sacrificing service to others, Williams, by his courageous determination, unwavering fortitude and valiant performance of duty, served as an inspiring example of heroism, in keeping with the highest traditions of the U.S. Naval Service. He gallantly gave his life for his country.

Harry S. Truman

== Namesake ==
The USS Jack Williams (FFG-24), which served from 1981 to 1996, was named in honor of him.

== See also ==
- List of Medal of Honor recipients for World War II
- List of Medal of Honor recipients for the Battle of Iwo Jima
