= Hans Fritzsche =

German Nazi official (1900–1953)

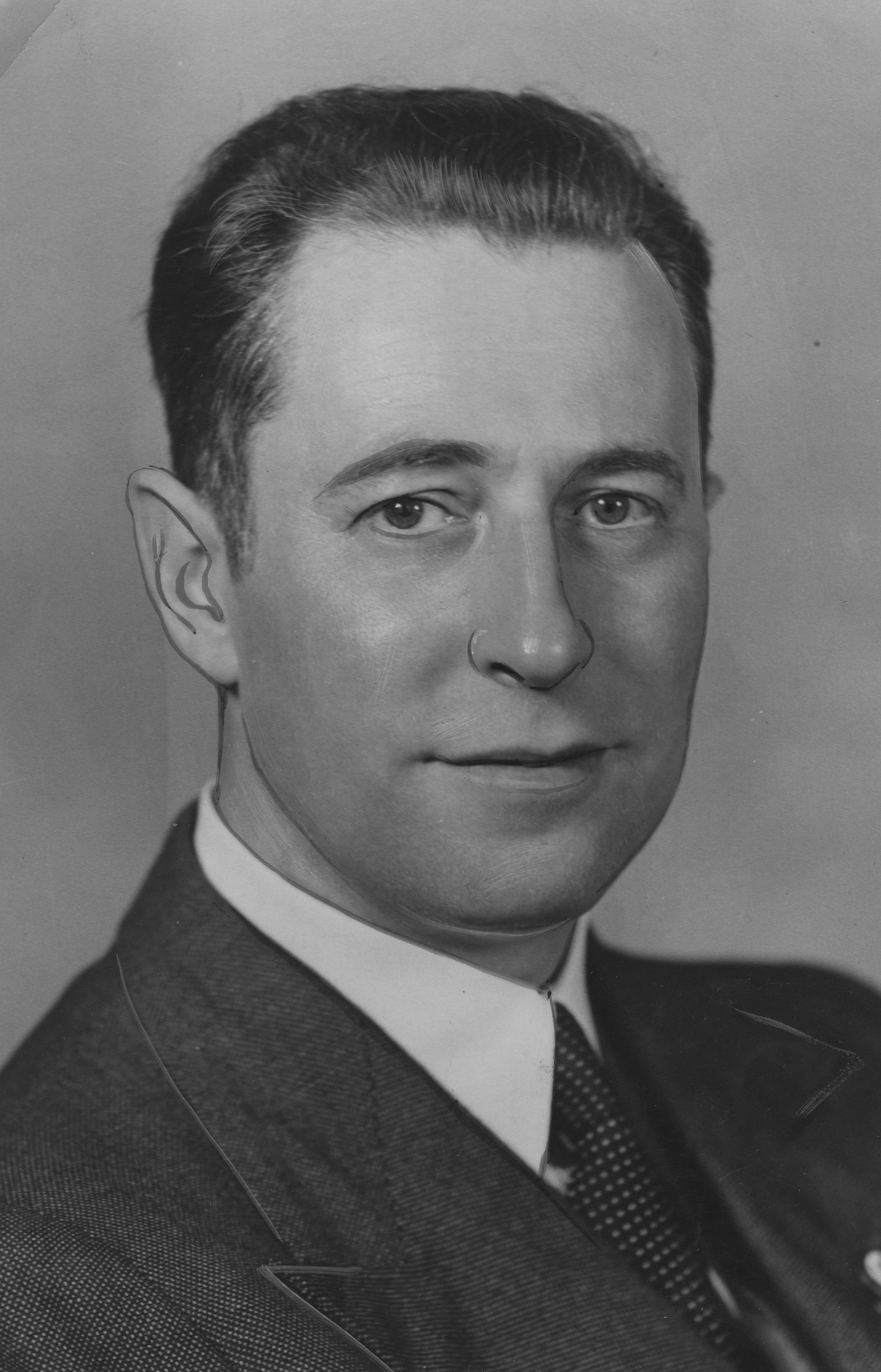
- Fritzsche in 1940

Personal details
- Born: 21 April 1900 Bochum, Province of Westphalia, Kingdom of Prussia, German Empire
- Died: 27 September 1953 (aged 53) Cologne, North Rhine-Westphalia, West Germany
- Party: Nazi Party
- Other political affiliations: German National People's Party
- Spouse: Hildegard Fritzsche
- Education: University of Greifswald; Humboldt University of Berlin
- Occupation: Ministerialdirektor in the Ministry for Popular Enlightenment and Propaganda
- Profession: Journalist, Government Official

Military service
- Allegiance: German Empire
- Branch/service: Imperial German Army
- Years of service: 1917–1918
- Rank: Soldat
- Battles/wars: World War I

August Franz Anton Hans Fritzsche (21 April 1900 – 27 September 1953) was a German journalist and broadcaster who was the Ministerialdirektor at the Reich Ministry of Public Enlightenment and Propaganda of Nazi Germany. He was the preeminent German broadcaster of his time, as part of efforts to present a more popular and entertaining side of the Nazi regime, and his voice was recognised by the majority of Germans.

After serving in the Imperial German Army in the First World War, Fritzsche joined Alfred Hugenberg's German National People's Party. He began his broadcasting career in 1932, and a year later his agency was incorporated into Joseph Goebbels' Propaganda Ministry, upon which he also became a member of the Nazi Party. He became head of the ministry's Press Division in 1938, and head of the Radio Division in 1942. Despite his prominence in German radio, Fritzsche played no significant role in the formulation of policy.

Fritzsche was present in the Berlin Führerbunker during the last days of Adolf Hitler. After Hitler's death, he surrendered to the Red Army. He was indicted for war crimes in the Nuremberg trials before the International Military Tribunal but was acquitted of all charges. In January 1947, a German denazification court sentenced him to nine years of hard labour. He was released under an amnesty in 1950 and died three years later.

== Biography ==
Fritzsche was born in Bochum (a city in the Ruhr region) to a Prussian postal clerk. He volunteered in the German Army in 1917 as a private soldier, and served in Flanders. After the war, he studied at the universities of Greifswald and Berlin, but did not pass his examinations. In 1923 he joined the conservative German National People's Party headed by Alfred Hugenberg and also became a journalist for the Hugenberg Press, which promoted nationalistic opinions not very different from the Nazis. In September 1932, he began his broadcasting career as head of the Drahtloser Dienst ('wireless service', a government agency), and started his first broadcast, a daily program called "Es spricht Hans Fritzsche" ('Hans Fritzsche speaking').

Following the Nazi seizure of power, Drahtloser Dienst with Fritzsche as its head was incorporated into Joseph Goebbels' Propaganda Ministry on 1 May 1933. Fritzsche joined the Nazi Party that same day. He later joined the Sturmabteilung (SA). He also was made a member of the Academy for German Law. In 1938, Fritzsche became head of the Press Division. In November 1942, he became head of the Radio Division. Fritzsche had no involvement in creating policy. During the war, Fritzsche was Germany's most prominent radio commentator.

In April 1945 he was present in the Berlin Führerbunker during the last days of Adolf Hitler and Goebbels. After Hitler's suicide on 30 April 1945, Goebbels assumed Hitler's role as chancellor. On 1 May, Goebbels completed his sole official act as chancellor. He dictated a letter to Soviet Army General Vasily Chuikov, requesting a temporary ceasefire and ordered German General Hans Krebs to deliver it. Chuikov commanded the Soviet forces in central Berlin. After this was rejected since the Soviets demanded unconditional capitulation, Goebbels decided that further efforts were futile. Goebbels then launched into a tirade berating the generals, reminding them Hitler forbade them to surrender. Fritzsche left the room to try to take matters into his own hands. He went to his nearby office on Wilhelmplatz and wrote a surrender letter addressed to Soviet Marshall Georgy Zhukov. An angry and drunk General Wilhelm Burgdorf followed Fritzsche to his office. There he asked Fritzsche if he intended to surrender Berlin. Fritzsche replied that he was going to do just that. Burgdorf shouted that Hitler had forbidden surrender and as a civilian he had no authority to do so. Burgdorf then pulled his pistol to shoot Fritzsche, but a radio technician knocked the gun and the bullet misfired, hitting the ceiling. Several men then hustled Burgdorf out of the office and he returned to the bunker. Fritzsche then left his office and went over to the Soviet lines and offered to surrender the city.

=== Military tribunal ===
17 October 1946 newsreel of Nuremberg Trials sentencing

Fritzsche was taken prisoner by Soviet Red Army soldiers. At first he was held prisoner in a basement and then sent to Moscow for interrogation at Lubyanka Prison where, according to his own account, three gold teeth were yanked from his mouth upon arrival. He was confined to a "standing coffin", a 0.28-square-metre (3 sq ft) cell where it was impossible to sleep, and placed on a bread and hot water diet; he eventually signed a confession. Later, he wrote his account of Soviet prison while on trial at Nuremberg, which was published in Switzerland.

Fritzsche was sent to Nuremberg, and tried before the International Military Tribunal (IMT). He was charged with conspiracy to commit crimes against peace, war crimes and crimes against humanity. In his positions in the propaganda apparatus of the Nazi State, Fritzsche played a role to further the conspiracy to commit atrocities and to launch the war of aggression. According to journalist and author William L. Shirer, it was unclear to the attendees why he was charged. Shirer remarked that "no-one in the courtroom, including Fritzsche, seemed to know why he was there – he was too small a fry – unless it were as a ghost for Goebbels". According to the IMT prosecution, Fritzsche "incited and encouraged the commission of War Crimes by deliberately falsifying news to arouse in the German People those passions which led them to the commission of atrocities", but he was acquitted because the court was "not prepared to hold that [his broadcasts] were intended to incite the German people to commit atrocities on conquered peoples". He was one of only three defendants to be acquitted at Nuremberg (along with Hjalmar Schacht and Franz von Papen).

Nuremberg prosecutor Alexander Hardy later said that evidence not available to the prosecution at the time proved Fritzsche not only knew of the extermination of European Jews but also "played an important part in bringing [Nazi crimes] about," and would have resulted in his conviction and execution. Fritzsche was classified as Group I (Major Offenders) by a denazification court, which sentenced him to nine years of hard labor in a labour camp on 31 January 1947. He was released under an amnesty in September 1950. He married his second wife, Hildegard Springer, in 1950. Fritzsche died of cancer in 1953. His wife died by suicide the same year.

Fritzsche, along with Albert Speer and Baldur von Schirach, were eventually communed by Lutheran Pastor Henry F. Gerecke and were administered the Eucharist.

According to British intelligence, Fritzsche, in the early 1950s, was part of the Naumann Circle, a group of ex-Nazis who aimed to infiltrate the Free Democratic Party and eventually restore the Nazi state.

== Publications ==
- Fritzsche, Hans (1953). as told to Hildegard Springer-Fritzsche (ed.). The Sword in The Scales. Translated by Diana Pyke, Heinrich Fraenkel. London: Allan Wingate. Account of the Nuremberg trials.

== See also ==
- Downfall, 2004 German film where he was portrayed by actor Michael Brandner
- Reich Ministry of Public Enlightenment and Propaganda
