= 2nd Battalion, 8th Marines =

2d Battalion, 8th Marines
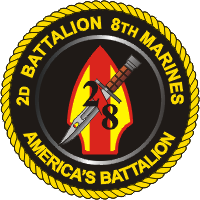
- 2nd Battalion, 8th Marines insignia
- Active: 1 April 1940 – 13 November 1947; 1 November 1950 – present
- Country: United States
- Branch: United States Marine Corps
- Type: Light infantry
- Role: Locate, close with and destroy the enemy by fire and maneuver and/ or repel enemy assault by fire and close combat.
- Part of: 8th Marine Regiment; 2nd Marine Division
- Garrison/HQ: Marine Corps Base Camp Lejeune
- Nickname: "America's Battalion"
- Mottos: "Non Sibi Sed Patriae" (English: "Not for self, but for country")
- Engagements: World War II; Battle of Guadalcanal; Battle of Tarawa; Battle of Saipan; Battle of Tinian; Battle of Okinawa; Lebanese Civil War; Multinational Force in Lebanon; Operation Urgent Fury; Persian Gulf War; Global War on Terrorism; Iraq War; 2003 invasion of Iraq; War in Afghanistan; Operation Strike of the Sword

Commanders
- Current commander: Lieutenant Colonel William M. Willis

2d Battalion, 8th Marines (2/8) is an infantry battalion in the United States Marine Corps based in Marine Corps Base Camp Lejeune, North Carolina consisting of approximately 900 marines and sailors. Nicknamed "America's Battalion", they fall under the 2nd Marine Regiment and the 2nd Marine Division.

== Subordinate units ==
- Headquarters Company
- Echo Company
- Fox Company
- Golf Company
- Weapons Company

Hotel Company was deactivated in August 1991.

== Mission ==
The mission of the Marine Corps rifle squad is to locate, close with and destroy the enemy by fire and maneuver and/ or repel enemy assault by fire and close combat.

== History ==
=== World War II ===
2d Battalion, 8th Marines was activated on 1 April 1940 in San Diego as the 2d Battalion 8th Marine Regiment and assigned to the 2d Marine Brigade. The 2d Marine Brigade was re-designated 1 February 1941 as 2nd Marine Division. During World War II, the battalion participated in the Battle of Guadalcanal, Battle of Tarawa, Battle of Saipan, Battle of Tinian and the Battle of Okinawa. Following the surrender of Japan, the battalion deployed to Nagasaki, Japan in September 1945 as part of the occupation. They remained in Japan in this capacity until they redeployed back to Marine Corps Base Camp Lejeune, North Carolina in June 1946. The battalion was deactivated on 13 November 1947 as part of the post-war drawdown of forces.

=== 1950–2000 ===
The battalion was reactivated on 1 December 1950 at Marine Corps Base Camp Lejeune, North Carolina and assigned to 2d Marine Division. From July to September 1958 they took part in the United States intervention in during the Lebanon crisis. This was followed by a deployment to Guantanamo Bay Naval Base as part of the Cuban Missile Crisis from October to December 1962.

- Relocated in June 1968 to Camp Bulkeley at Guantanamo Bay, Cuba, as Ground Defense Force.
- Relocated in August 1973 to Camp Lejeune, NC. (Contingent of Hotel Co. remained as Special Mission Force until 1976.)
- Participated as part of Multi-Nation Peace Keeping Force in Lebanon August – September 1982, and November 1983 - February 1984.
- Participated in Operation Urgent Fury in Grenada October – November 1983.
- Participated in Operation Provide Comfort Iraq April – July 1991.
- Elements participated in Operation Support Democracy Cuba October – November 1993.
- Participated in support of Operation Joint Endeavor Adriatic Sea October 1996.
- Elements participated in security operations Haiti and Panama November 1997 – February 1998 and January – August 1999.

2/8 Echo Company was the Unit deployed to Haiti in 1993, with 3rd Platoon from Golf Company being attached to Echo Company for the duration.

=== Global war on terror ===
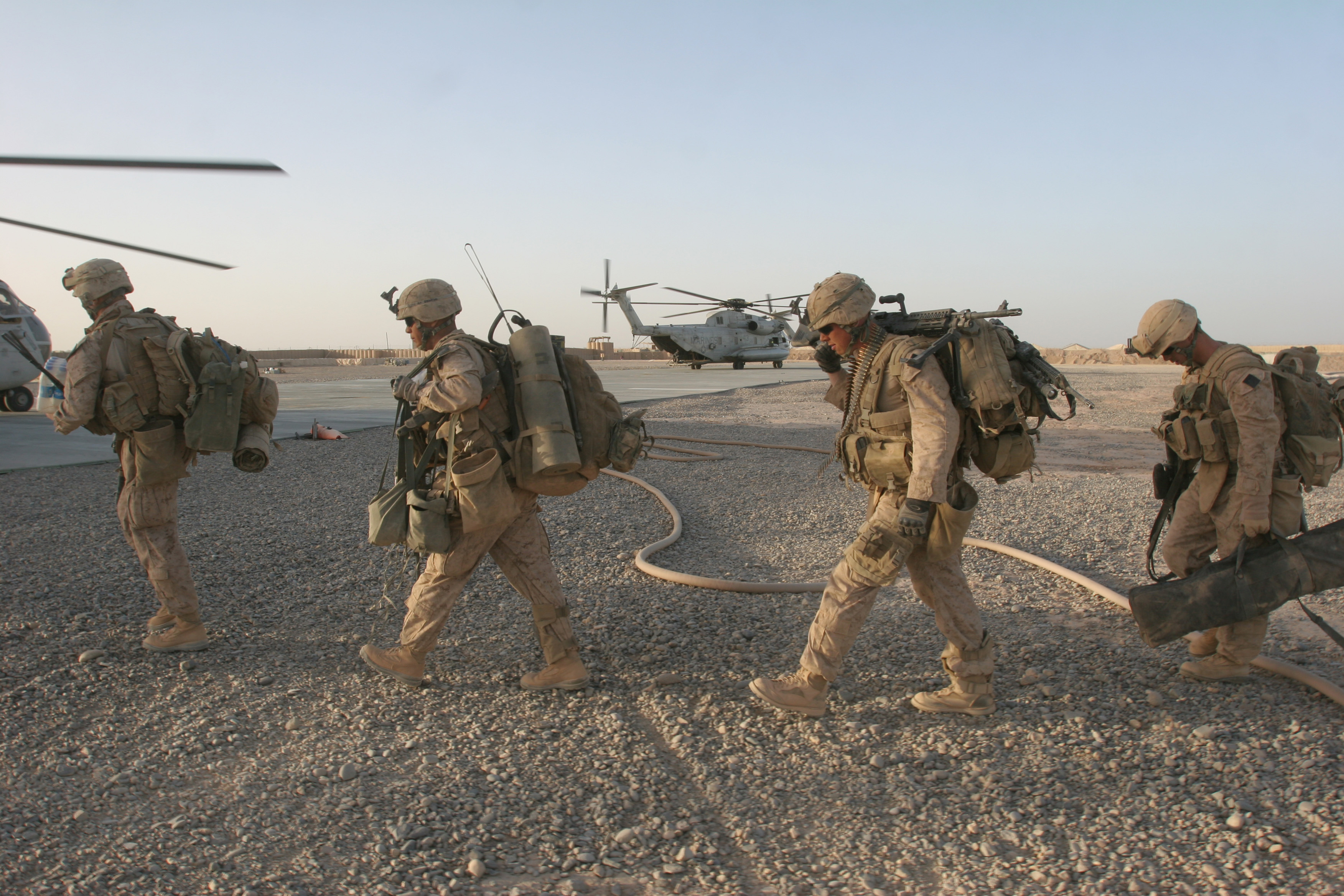
Marines in Afghanistan, July 2009

- Operation Iraqi Freedom – Iraq, March – May 2003.
- Operation Enduring Freedom – Afghanistan November 2003 to May 2004.
- 26th MEU – Iraq, March 2005 – September 2005.
- Operation Iraqi Freedom – Iraq, July 2006 – February 2007.
- Operation Iraqi Freedom – Iraq, October 2007 – May 2008.
- Operation Enduring Freedom – Afghanistan, May 2009 – November 2009.
- Operation Enduring Freedom – Afghanistan, January 2011 – August 2011.
- Operation Enduring Freedom – Afghanistan, March 2013-October 2013

=== Awards ===
- Presidential Unit Citation with 4 bronze stars
- Joint Meritorious Unit Award
- Navy Unit Commendation
- Meritorious Unit Commendation
- Marine Corps Expeditionary Medal
- American Defense Service Medal
- Asiatic–Pacific Campaign Medal with 1 silver star
- World War II Victory Medal
- Navy Occupation Service Medal
- National Defense Service Medal with 3 bronze stars
- Armed Forces Expeditionary Medal with 3 bronze stars
- Southwest Asia Service Medal with 1 bronze star
- Global War on Terrorism Expeditionary Medal
- Afghanistan Campaign Medal
- Iraqi Campaign FEAST * Lt. Gen. Chesty B. Puller Outstanding Leadership Award – on 15 May 2007, the 2/8 received this award for "professional achievement and sustained superior performance in training, maintaining, equipping, fostering, nurturing and mentoring Marines and sailors as well as overall unit mission accomplishment from 1 April 2006 to 30 September 2006."

== Notable former members ==
- Ray L. Smith, during the Invasion of Grenada and with the Multinational Force in Lebanon.
- Jonathan T. Yale, posthumously awarded Navy Cross during the Iraq War when he and fellow Marine Jordan C. Haerter stood their ground, stopping a suicide truck bomb from detonating within their security station.

== See also ==
- 3rd Battalion 3rd Marines – Also known as "America's Battalion"
- History of the United States Marine Corps
- List of United States Marine Corps battalions
- Organization of the United States Marine Corps
