= Royal Bahraini Naval Force =

Naval branch of the Bahrain Defense Force

- سلاح البحرية الملكية البحرينية
- Naval jack
- Founded: 1979
- Country: Bahrain
- Allegiance: King of Bahrain
- Type: Navy
- Size: 700 personnel 35 ships 2 aircraft
- Part of: Bahrain Defense Force
- Garrison/HQ: Mina Salman Naval Base
- Nickname: RBNF
- Engagements: Saudi-led intervention in the Yemeni civil war; Blockade of Yemen; Red Sea crisis; Operation Prosperity Guardian

Commanders
- Commander of the Navy: Rear Admiral Ahmed bin Mohammed bin Ibrahim Al Bin Ali

Insignia
- Naval Ensign

The Royal Bahrain Naval Force (Arabic: القوات البحرية الملكية البحرينية, abbreviated RBNF), also called the Royal Bahraini Navy, is the maritime branch of the Bahrain Defence Force. The RBNF consists of 700 personnel, 35 ships, and two helicopters. The fleet includes two frigates, the former U.S. Oliver Hazard Perry-class.

The RBNF received the frigate RBNS Sabha from the U.S., arriving in Bahrain on 9 July 1997. On 18 January 2024, a second Oliver Hazard Perry-class frigate, RBNS Khalid bin Ali, reached Bahrain after being transferred from the U.S. Navy.

== History ==
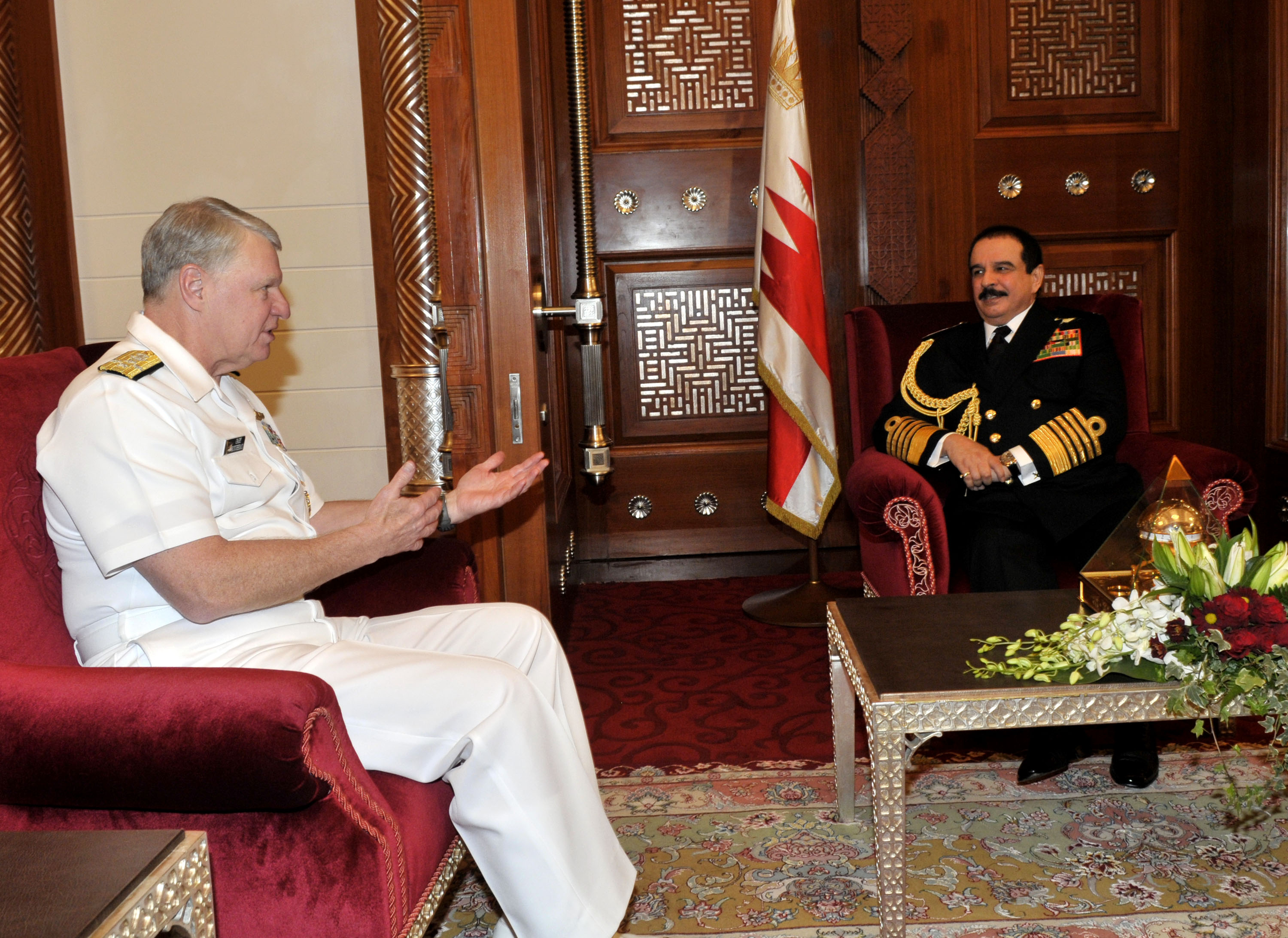
King Hamad bin Khalifa Al Thani in a Royal Bahraini Navy uniform

The United States and Bahrain signed an agreement on 23 December 1971 that allowed the U.S. Navy's Middle East Force to use the former British naval facilities in the country after they were given over to the Government of Bahrain by the United Kingdom. Bahrain's first warship entered the Royal Bahraini Naval Force on 20 March 1979, and it acquired the frigate RBNS Sabha on 9 July 1997.

Bahrain deployed RBNS Sabha with U.S. ships during the invasion of Iraq and Operation Enduring Freedom.

== Fleet ==
=== Ships ===
Type/Class	Quantity	Origin	In service	Details
Frigate
Oliver Hazard Perry class frigate (RBNS Sabha and RBNS Khalid bin Ali)	2	United States	1997–present	4 Harpoon SSMs, 1 MBB BO-105 shipboard helicopter, and SM-1MR SAMs.
Corvette
Al-Manama class Lürssen FPB 62 Guided-Missile Corvette Combatants	2	Germany	1988–present	4 MM40 Exocets. Being upgraded with new weapon control system.
Offshore patrol vessel
River-class Offshore Patrol Vessel - Modified Batch 1b (RBNS Al-Zubara)	1	United Kingdom	2020 - Present	ex-HMS Clyde (P257).
Patrol craft
Cyclone-class patrol ship	5	United States	2022–present	
Ahmed Al Fateh class Lürssen TNC 45 Guided-Missile Patrol Craft	4	Germany	1984–present	4 MM40 Exocets. Being upgraded with new weapon control system.
Al Riffa class Lürssen FPB 38 Patrol Craft	2	Germany	1982–present	
Al Jarim Swiftships 65 Patrol Boat	2	United States	1982–present	
Swiftships 35 Fast Patrol Vessels (FPV35s)	2	United States	2021	
Mark V Special Operations Craft	7	United States	5 during 2018–19	
Vigor Response-Boat Mediums (RB-M)	2	United States	2019	
BMT Group 18m patrol boat	6	United Kingdom	2013–present	Built in Turkey, option for 6 more.
Wasp-11	2			
Wasp-20	2			
Wasp-30	1			
VT Group VT-Halmatic 20	4	Qatar		
VT Group VT-Halmatic 160	6	Qatar		
Fairey Marine Swordsman	4	United Kingdom		
Amphibious warfare ship
Al Hamra class ADSB Steel Landing Craft	4	United Arab Emirates	2009+	2 42-meter and 2 16-meter.
LCU-1466	4	United States		
Fairey Marine LCU	1	United Kingdom		
Arab Shipbuilding and Repair Yard Company Landing craft	1	Bahrain	2016	34.5m in overall length. 1 more could be ordered.

=== Aircraft ===
Type	Quantity	Origin	In service	Details
Helicopter
Bo 105CBS-4	2	Germany		The naval force operates a squadron of two Bo 105CBS-4 helicopters.

=== Missiles & Torpedoes ===
Type	Quantity	Origin	In service	Details
Missiles & Torpedoes
Exocet MM-40	67	France		Delivered between 1984 and 2010.
Harpoon	8	United States		Delivered 1997–1998.
RIM-66 Standard	22	United States		RIM-66B Standard-1MR delivered 1997.
Mark 46 torpedo	18	United States		Mk-46 Mod-5 NEARTIP delivered 1997.

== Ranks ==
Officer ranks

Rank group	General / flag officers					Senior officers			Junior officers
Royal Bahraini Naval Force
Royal Bahraini Naval Force	مشیر; Mushir	فريق أول; Fariq 'awal	فريق; Fariq	لواء; Liwa	عميد; Amid	عقيد; Aqid	مقدم; Muqaddam	رائد; Ra'id	نقيب; Naqib	ملازم أول; Mulazim awwal	ملازم; Mulazim

Enlisted and NCO ranks

Rank group	Senior NCOs		Junior NCOs	Enlisted
Royal Bahraini Naval Force					No insignia
Royal Bahraini Naval Force	رقیب أول; Raqib 'awal	رقیب; Raqib	عريف; Earif	جندي أول; Jundiun awwal	جندي; Jundiun

== Future ==
Sep. 8, 2017 - The US State Department has made a determination approving a possible Foreign Military Sale to Bahrain for two 35 Meter Fast Patrol Boats. The estimated cost is $60.25 million. Now in service.

In 2019, Bahrain has purchased another frigate from the US, the USS Robert G. Bradley (FFG-49) which will join the fleet after completion of current refurbishment works.

Bahrain has ordered 6 Vigor RB-M Fast Interceptor boats. 3+ now in service.

1 Hamilton-class cutter acquired from the United States in 2020 and 5 Cyclone patrol ships also acquired from the United States in 2022.

Bahrain Eyes French-Origin Egypt-Built Gowind Corvettes

== Bases ==
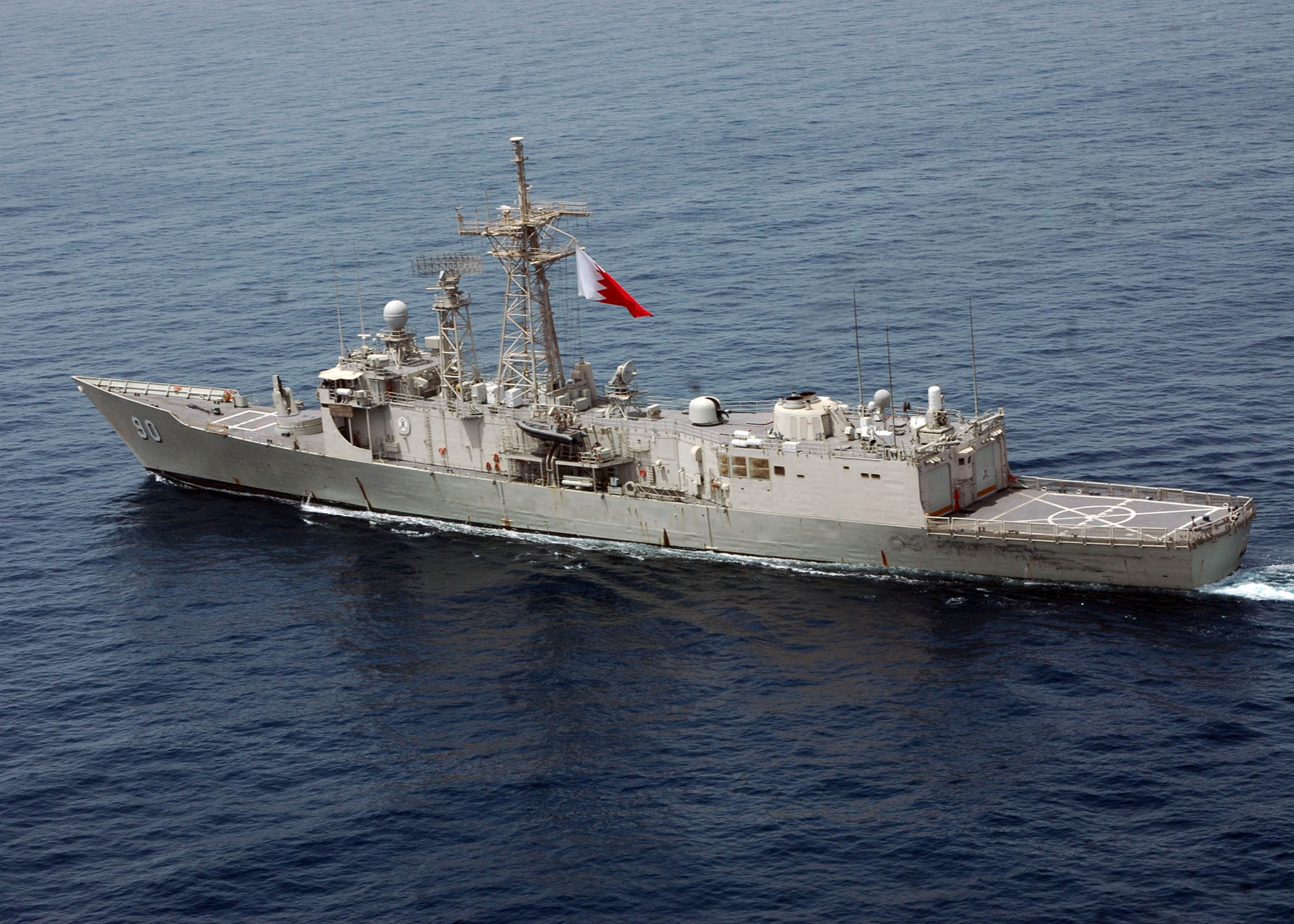
RBNS Sabha in April 2008.

- Mina Salman Naval Base is a facility currently shared with the United States Navy and is used as a ship and submarine logistic support base for the entire US Fifth Fleet. It was opened in the 1980s as cargo facility and is now solely used as a naval port.
- Manama Naval Base is another key US Navy installation and formerly home to HMS Juffair. It is not used by RBNF.
- RBNF also operates a shipyard that is shared with several other neighbouring countries.

== See also ==
- Naval Support Activity Bahrain
