= 3rd Battalion, 28th Marines =

Inactive US infantry unit

3rd Battalion 28th Marines
- Country: United States of America
- Branch: United States Marine Corps
- Type: Infantry battalion
- Role: Locate, close with and destroy the enemy with fire and maneuver
- Size: 1000
- Part of: Inactive
- Engagements: World War II: Battle of Iwo Jima; Vietnam War

The 3rd Battalion, 28th Marines (3/28) is an inactive infantry battalion of the United States Marine Corps. They were part of the 28th Marine Regiment and 5th Marine Division and fought during the Battle of Iwo Jima in World War II. They were activated again for the Vietnam War but were deactivated after the war and remain inactive today.

== History ==
=== Battle of Iwo Jima ===
They were assigned to land at green beach after D-Day. On D-Day, 1st Battalion, 28th Marines (1/28) and 2nd Battalion, 28th Marines (2/28) would hit green beach. 3rd Battalion, 28th Marines was summoned in the battle earlier than expected. 3rd Battalion, 28th Marines helped fight for Mount Suribachi. On D-Day plus four the mountain was secured by a platoon from 2nd Battalion, 28th Marines. After the capture of Mt. Suribachi the entire 28th Marine Regiment was thrown in the fight for the northern half of the island.

On the night of March 24, 1945, the final organized Japanese combat unit made a final charge at the 28th and 26th Marines. 53 Americans and 262 Japanese were killed in the attack. The island was declared completely secure a few hours later. After the war, 3/28 was deactivated.

By the end of the campaign, 3/28 had suffered heavy casualties, especially among junior officers. In the line companies (G, H, and I), only three of twenty-one officers were neither killed nor wounded. This statistic excludes the replacement officers. All officers in Company H were killed, died of wounds, or were wounded.

=== Vietnam War ===
They were re-activated during the Vietnam War and participated in many campaigns in the northern areas of South Vietnam.

== Unit awards ==
- Presidential Unit Citation, 19-28 February 1945, Iwo Jima

== See also ==
- History of the United States Marine Corps
- List of United States Marine Corps battalions
